= List of roles and awards of Mike Judge =

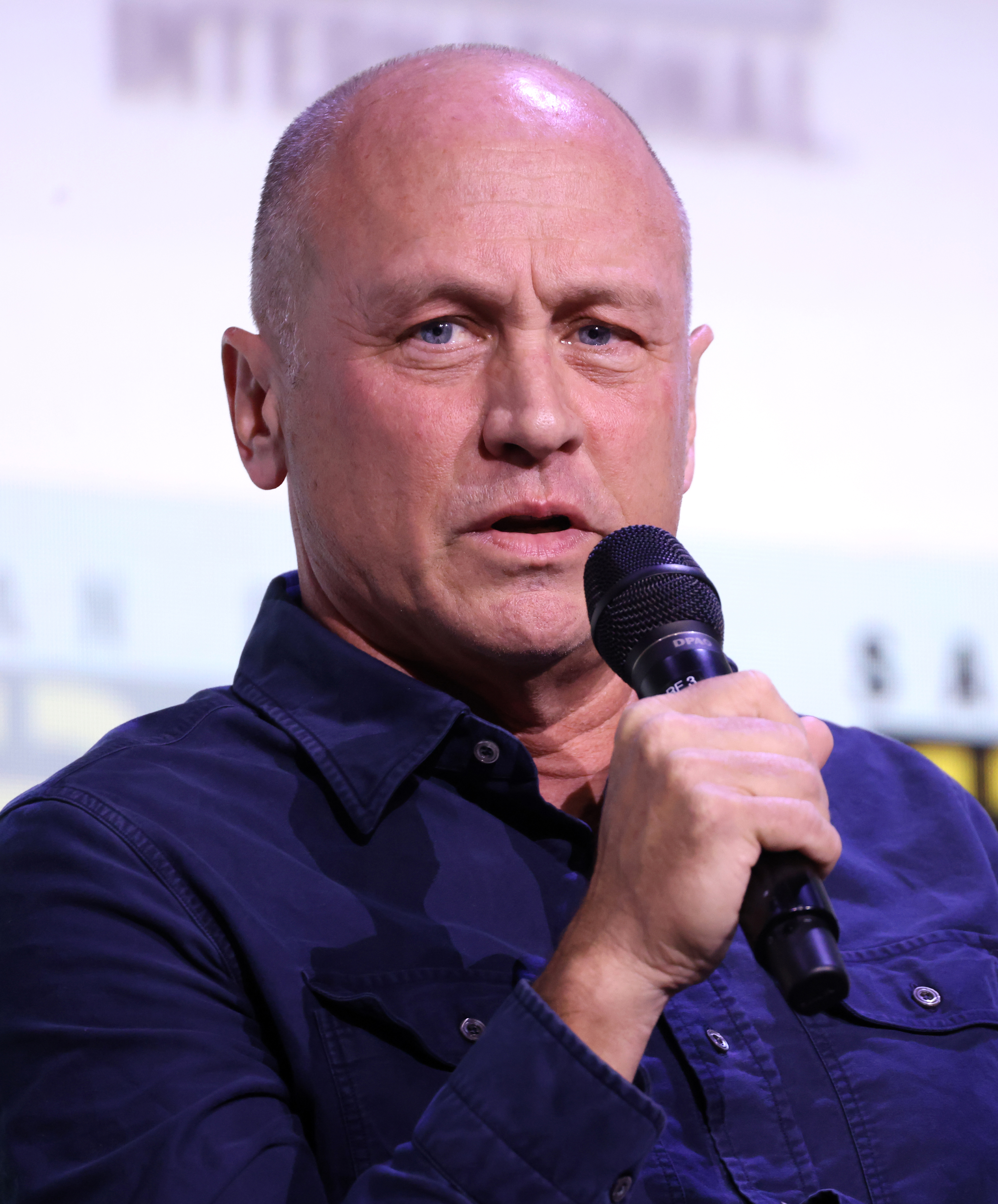
Judge in 2025

Michael Craig Judge (born 1962) is an American actor, animator, writer, producer, and director. He is the creator of the animated television series Beavis and Butt-Head (1993–1997, 2011, 2022–present), and co-created the television series King of the Hill (1997–2010, 2025–present), The Goode Family (2009), Silicon Valley (2014–2019), and Mike Judge Presents: Tales from the Tour Bus (2017–2018).

Judge also wrote and directed the films Beavis and Butt-Head Do America (1996), Office Space (1999), Idiocracy (2006), and Extract (2009), and co-wrote the screenplay to Beavis and Butt-Head Do the Universe (2022).

Judge has won a Primetime Emmy Award and two Annie Awards for King of the Hill and two Critics' Choice Television Awards and Satellite Awards for Silicon Valley.

== Filmography ==
=== Film ===
Year	Title	Functioned as				Role	Notes
Year	Title	Director	Writer	Producer	Actor	Role	Notes
1991	Huh?	Yes	Yes	Yes	Yes	Hillbilly, Mother Earth Whole Foods spokesperson (voice)	Short film Also did animation and music
1991	The Honky Problem	Yes	Yes	Yes	Yes	Inbred Jed (voice)	Short film Also did animation and music
1991	Milton	Yes	Yes	Yes	Yes	Milton, additional voices	Short film Also did animation and music
1994	Airheads	No	No	No	Yes	Beavis, Butt-Head (voice)	
1996	Beavis and Butt-Head Do America	Yes	Yes	Yes	Yes	Beavis, Butt-Head, David Van Driessen, Tom Anderson, Principal McVicker	Also executive soundtrack producer
1999	Office Space	Yes	Yes	Yes	Yes	Stan	
1999	South Park: Bigger, Longer & Uncut	No	No	No	Yes	Kenny McCormick unhooded (voice)	
2001	Spy Kids	No	No	No	Yes	Donnagon Giggles	Cameo
2002	Serving Sara	No	No	No	Yes	Motel manager	Cameo
2002	Spy Kids 2: The Island of Lost Dreams	No	No	No	Yes	Donnagon Giggles	
2003	Spy Kids 3-D: Game Over	No	No	No	Yes	Donnagon Giggles	
2006	Idiocracy	Yes	Yes	Yes	Yes	I.Q test machine (voice; uncredited)	
2006	Jackass Number Two	No	No	No	Yes	Himself	Guest appearance
2007	Jackass 2.5	No	No	No	Yes	Himself	Guest appearance
2009	Extract	Yes	Yes	No	Yes	Jim	
2010	Jackass 3D	No	No	No	Yes	Beavis, Butt-Head (voice)	Cameo
2013	R.I.P.D.	No	No	No	Yes	Various Deado Voices	
2016	Punching Henry	No	No	No	Yes	Ed	
2016	Nerdland	No	No	No	Yes	Archie (voice)	
2017	Sandy Wexler	No	No	No	Yes	Beavis, Butt-Head (voice)	Cameo
2018	Action Point	No	Story	No	No		
2018	The Front Runner	No	No	No	Yes	Jim Savage	
2022	Beavis and Butt-Head Do the Universe	No	Yes	Executive	Yes	Beavis, Butt-Head, David Van Driessen, Principal McVicker, additional voices	
TBA	Automated Trucking †	Yes	No	Yes	No		Post-production

=== Television ===
Year	Title	Functioned as					Role	Notes
Year	Title	Creator	Director	Writer	Executive Producer	Actor	Role	Notes
1992	Liquid Television	No	Yes	Yes	No	Yes	Various voices	Episode: "Frog Baseball", "Office Space", "The Honky Problem", and "Peace, Love and Understanding"; also did animation and music
1993–1997; 2011; 2022–present	Beavis and Butt-Head	Yes	Yes	Yes	Yes	Yes	Beavis, Butt-Head, David Van Driessen, Tom Anderson, Principal McVicker, Coach Buzzcut, Todd (1993 only), additional voices	Also musical theme composer
1993–2002	Saturday Night Live	No	Yes	Yes	No	Yes	Milton, Bill, Beavis, Butt-Head, additional voices	5 episodes
1993–2009	Late Show with David Letterman	No	No	No	No	Yes	Beavis, Butt-Head (voice)	3 episodes
1994	The Head	No	No	No	No	Yes	Butt-Head (voice)	Episode: "The Head/The Date"
1997–2010; 2025–present	King of the Hill	Yes	No	Yes	Yes	Yes	Hank Hill, Jeff Boomhauer, Stuart Dooley, Octavio, Monsignor Martinez, Junchiro Hill (2025 only), additional voices	
1997	69th Academy Awards	No	No	No	No	Yes	Beavis, Butt-Head (voice)	TV special
1997	The Simpsons	No	No	No	No	Yes	Hank Hill (voice)	Episode: "Bart Star"
2000	Monsignor Martinez	Yes	Yes	Yes	Yes	No		Spinoff of King of the Hill; Unaired TV pilot
2003	Frasier	No	No	No	No	Yes	Van	Episode: "The Harassed"
2006	Aqua Teen Hunger Force	No	No	No	No	Yes	Aliens (voice)	Episode: "Antenna"
2009	The Goode Family	Yes	No	Yes	Yes	Yes	Gerald Goode, The Average Guy, additional voices	13 episodes
2010–2012	The Cleveland Show	No	No	No	No	Yes	Hank Hill (voice)	2 episodes
2011	Jimmy Kimmel Live!	No	No	No	No	Yes	Beavis, Butt-Head (voice)	2 episodes
2013–2022	Family Guy	No	No	No	No	Yes	Hank Hill, Beavis, Butt-Head (voice)	3 episodes
2013	You and Your Fucking Coffee	No	No	No	No	Yes	Stan	Episode: "Houseguest"
2014–2019	Silicon Valley	Yes	Yes	Yes	Yes	No		53 episodes
2017–2018	Mike Judge Presents: Tales from the Tour Bus	Yes	Yes	Yes	Yes	Yes	Narrator (voice)	16 episodes
2019	Sherman's Showcase	No	No	No	No	Yes	Hellman Groolsby	Episode: "The Showcase Dancers"
2020	Better Things	No	No	No	No	Yes	Himself	Episode: "She's Fifty"
2023	Praise Petey	No	No	No	Yes	No		10 episodes
2024	In the Know	Yes	No	No	Yes	Yes	Sandy (voice)	6 episodes
2024	Exploding Kittens	No	No	No	Yes	No		9 episodes
2025	Common Side Effects	No	No	No	Yes	Yes	Various Voices	
2026	South Park	No	No	No	No	Yes	Kenny McCormick unhooded (voice)	Episode: "South American Biker Gangs"

=== Other appearances ===
Year	Title	Functioned as		Role	Notes
Year	Title	Director	Actor	Role	Notes
1994	Beavis and Butt-Head	No	Yes	Beavis, Butt-Head (voice)	Video game
1995	Beavis and Butt-Head in Virtual Stupidity	No	Yes	Beavis, Butt-Head (voice)	Video game
1996	Beavis and Butt-Head in Calling All Dorks	No	Yes	Beavis, Butt-Head (voice)	Video game
1996	Beavis and Butt-Head in Wiener Takes All	No	Yes	Beavis, Butt-Head (voice)	Video game
1996	Beavis and Butt-Head in Little Thingies	No	Yes	Beavis, Butt-Head (voice)	Video game
1997	Beavis and Butt-Head in Screen Wreckers	No	Yes	Beavis, Butt-Head (voice)	Video game
1998	Beavis and Butt-Head: Bunghole in One	No	Yes	Beavis, Butt-Head (voice)	Video game
1999	Beavis and Butt-Head Do U.	No	Yes	Beavis, Butt-Head (voice)	Video game
2000	King of the Hill	No	Yes	Hank Hill, Jeff Boomhauer (voice)	Video game
2012	"The Wind"	Yes	No		Music video
2015	Kid Cudi - Speedin' Bullet 2 Heaven	No	Yes	Beavis, Butt-Head, David Van Driessen (voice)	Voice skits on the album, featured in the songs Man in the Night, Adventures, Handle with Care, and Red Sabbath
2022	Warped Kart Racers	No	Yes	Hank Hill, Jeff Boomhauer (voice)	Video game
2025	Call of Duty: Black Ops 6	No	Yes	Beavis, Butt-Head, Coach Buzzcut, Todd (voice)	Video game
2025	Fortnite Battle Royale	No	Yes	Beavis, Butt-Head, Hank Hill (voice)	Video game

== Awards and nominations ==
Year	Award	Nominated work	Result
1994	CableACE Award for Best Comedy Series	Beavis and Butt-Head	Nominated
1997	Annie Award for Best Animated Television Production	King of the Hill	Nominated
1997	Annie Award for Best Individual Achievement: Voice Acting by a Male Performer in a TV Production	King of the Hill for Hank Hill	Nominated
1997	Primetime Emmy Award for Outstanding Animated Program	King of the Hill for "Square Peg"	Nominated
1997	MTV Movie Award for Best On-Screen Duo	Beavis and Butt-Head Do America for Beavis & Butt-Head	Nominated
1997	Golden Raspberry Award for Worst Screen Couple	Beavis and Butt-Head Do America for Beavis & Butt-Head	Nominated
1997	Golden Raspberry Award for Worst New Star	Beavis and Butt-Head Do America for Beavis & Butt-Head	Nominated
1997	TCA Award for Outstanding Achievement in Comedy	King of the Hill	Nominated
1998	Annie Award for Outstanding Achievement in an Animated Primetime or Late Night Television Program	King of the Hill	Nominated
1998	Kids' Choice Award for Favorite Cartoon	King of the Hill	Nominated
1998	Primetime Emmy Award for Outstanding Animated Program	King of the Hill for "Texas City Twister"	Nominated
1999	Primetime Emmy Award for Outstanding Animated Program	King of the Hill for "And They Call It Bobby Love"	Won
1999	Annie Award for Outstanding Achievement in an Animated Television Program	King of the Hill	Nominated
2000	Annie Award for Outstanding Individual Achievement for Voice Acting by a Male Performer in an Animated Television Production	King of the Hill for Hank Hill	Nominated
2001	American Comedy Award for Funniest Television Series – Animated	King of the Hill	Nominated
2001	Primetime Emmy Award for Outstanding Animated Program	King of the Hill for "Chasing Bobby"	Nominated
2002	Primetime Emmy Award for Outstanding Animated Program	King of the Hill for "Bobby Goes Nuts"	Nominated
2003	GLAAD Media Award for Outstanding Individual Episode	King of the Hill for "My Own Private Rodeo"	Nominated
2004	Certificate of Merit (Annie Award)		Won
2005	Satellite Award for Outstanding Overall DVD	Office Space	Nominated
2005	Satellite Award for Best DVD Extras	Office Space	Nominated
2006	Teen Choice Award for Choice Animated Show	King of the Hill	Nominated
2006	Annie Award for Best Animated Television Production	King of the Hill	Nominated
2007	People's Choice Award for Favorite Animated Comedy	King of the Hill	Nominated
2008	People's Choice Award for Favorite Animated Comedy	King of the Hill	Nominated
2008	Primetime Emmy Award for Outstanding Animated Program	King of the Hill for "Death Picks Cotton"	Nominated
2008	Annie Award for Best General Audience Animated TV/Broadcast Production	King of the Hill	Nominated
2009	Prism Award for Best Comedy Episode	King of the Hill for "Dia-BILL-ic Shock"	Won
2009	Winsor McCay Award		Won
2012	Teen Choice Award for Choice Animated Series	Beavis and Butt-Head	Nominated
2014	Critics' Choice Television Award for Best Comedy Series	Silicon Valley	Nominated
2014	SXSW Audience Award: Episodic	Silicon Valley	Won
2014	Primetime Emmy Award for Outstanding Comedy Series	Silicon Valley	Nominated
2014	Primetime Emmy Award for Outstanding Directing for a Comedy Series	Silicon Valley for "Minimum Viable Product"	Nominated
2014	AFI Award for TV Program of the Year	Silicon Valley	Won
2015	Golden Globe Award for Best Television Series – Musical or Comedy	Silicon Valley	Nominated
2015	Directors Guild of America Award for Outstanding Directing – Comedy Series	Silicon Valley	Nominated
2015	Writers Guild of America Award for Television: Comedy Series	Silicon Valley	Nominated
2015	Writers Guild of America Award for Television: New Series	Silicon Valley	Nominated
2015	Satellite Award for Best Television Series – Musical or Comedy	Silicon Valley	Nominated
2015	Critics' Choice Television Award for Best Comedy Series	Silicon Valley	Won
2015	Primetime Emmy Award for Outstanding Comedy Series	Silicon Valley	Nominated
2015	Primetime Emmy Award for Outstanding Directing for a Comedy Series	Silicon Valley for "Sand Hill Shuffle"	Nominated
2016	Golden Globe Award for Best Television Series – Musical or Comedy	Silicon Valley	Nominated
2016	Producers Guild of America Award for Outstanding Producer of Episodic Television, Comedy	Silicon Valley	Nominated
2016	Directors Guild of America Award for Outstanding Directing – Comedy Series	Silicon Valley	Nominated
2016	Writers Guild of America Award for Television: Comedy Series	Silicon Valley	Nominated
2016	Satellite Award for Best Television Series – Musical or Comedy	Silicon Valley	Won
2016	TCA Award for Outstanding Achievement in Comedy	Silicon Valley	Nominated
2016	Primetime Emmy Award for Outstanding Comedy Series	Silicon Valley	Nominated
2016	Primetime Emmy Award for Outstanding Directing for a Comedy Series	Silicon Valley for "Founder Friendly""	Nominated
2016	Critics' Choice Television Award for Best Comedy Series	Silicon Valley	Won
2016	Inkpot Award		Won
2017	Satellite Award for Best Television Series – Musical or Comedy	Silicon Valley	Won
2017	Producers Guild of America Award for Outstanding Producer of Episodic Television, Comedy	Silicon Valley	Nominated
2017	Directors Guild of America Award for Outstanding Directing – Comedy Series	Silicon Valley	Nominated
2017	Writers Guild of America Award for Television: Comedy Series	Silicon Valley	Nominated
2017	Animation Writers Caucus Animation Writing Award		Won
2017	Primetime Emmy Award for Outstanding Comedy Series	Silicon Valley	Nominated
2017	Primetime Emmy Award for Outstanding Directing for a Comedy Series	Silicon Valley for "Server Error"	Nominated
2018	Producers Guild of America Award for Outstanding Producer of Episodic Television, Comedy	Silicon Valley	Nominated
2018	Directors Guild of America Award for Outstanding Directing – Comedy Series	Silicon Valley	Nominated
2018	Writers Guild of America Award for Television: Comedy Series	Silicon Valley	Nominated
2018	Primetime Emmy Award for Outstanding Comedy Series	Silicon Valley	Nominated
2018	Primetime Emmy Award for Outstanding Directing for a Comedy Series	Silicon Valley for "Initial Coin Offering"	Nominated
2025	Primetime Emmy Award for Outstanding Animated Program	Common Side Effects	Nominated
2025	Independent Spirit Award for Best New Scripted Series	Common Side Effects	Nominated
