= Lumberg =

Lumberg may refer to:

- Lumberg (unit), an old and deprecated photometric unit of luminous energy
- Bill Lumbergh, fictional character in comedy film Office Space
