= Bill Lumbergh =

Fictional character created by Mike Judge

William Lumbergh
- Office Space character
- Gary Cole as Lumbergh in Office Space
- Created by: Mike Judge
- Portrayed by: Gary Cole

In-universe information
- Nickname: Lumbergh
- Occupation: Division Vice President, Initech (formerly); Division Vice President, Initrode (currently)

William Lumbergh is a fictional character, who appeared initially in the Milton animated shorts, and later was portrayed by Gary Cole in the 1999 film Office Space as the film's main antagonist. A caricature of corporate management, Lumbergh is a division vice president of the Texas-based software company Initech, and serves as the main antagonist of the film. He drives a blue Porsche 911 SC with a vanity license plate "MY PRSHE". He wears formal, solid-color day dress shirts with Winchester collars and suspenders with a belt—a fashion faux pas—as well as an MIT college class ring. According to his Initech employee's personnel file, Lumbergh graduated from MIT with a BS in physics.

Lumbergh is a micromanager who is focused on busy work and paperwork, notably TPS reports. He has been described as "the antithesis of the motivational management leadership ideal". He greets subordinates with an unenthusiastic and entirely rhetorical "What's happening?", and when asking an employee to do an unpleasant task, starts the sentence with, "I'm gonna need you to", or "If you could go ahead and", as well as ending these requests with "that'd be great/terrific" and "mmmkay?" A Wharton Journal article said that the character "brilliantly exposed the emptiness of linguistic conventions at work." Social historian Joe Moran writes that Lumbergh's "non-confrontational" communication style "masks the reality of management coercion".

== Role in the film ==
In the film, Lumbergh is presented as a micromanager, whose favourite targets are programmer Peter Gibbons (the main protagonist, played by Ron Livingston) and collator Milton Waddams (Stephen Root). He makes Peter work nearly every weekend and belittles him for not including a new-design cover sheet on a TPS report, and assigns Milton an ever-increasing number of menial tasks and constantly makes him move his desk, further and further from the window.

After Peter sleeps throughout the weekend after being hypnotised into not caring about his job, Lumbergh leaves seventeen messages on Peter's answering machine.

Despite being a vice-president, Lumbergh is shown to be spineless when business consultants Bob Slydell and Bob Porter are brought in to help with downsizing Initech, and eventually start questioning Lumbergh after his poor management comes to their attention. He also does not know how to respond to Peter's flippant attitude when he comes to work while hypnotised; Peter's actions include removing a door handle that constantly gives him static shocks, filleting fish at his desk, playing Tetris, and casually knocking down a cubicle that blocked his view out the window. Furthermore, when Milton is revealed to have been made redundant five years earlier, but still receives pay and comes to Initech (as neither he nor the accounting department were told), the consultants tell accounting to stop paying Milton without telling him and Lumbergh laughs, as well as confiscating Milton's beloved red Swingline stapler and eventually moving him and his desk downstairs to the basement storage areas, where he is told to tackle the cockroach problem.

After this, Lumbergh's fate is never elaborated on, though the deleted scenes reveal the filmmakers considered having him die in a fire started by Milton in revenge for being mistreated, and Peter, alongside coworkers Michael and Samir, discuss attending his funeral. In deleted scenes Peter's boss at his new construction job behaves exactly like Lumbergh.
