= TPS report =

Fictional quality assurance document

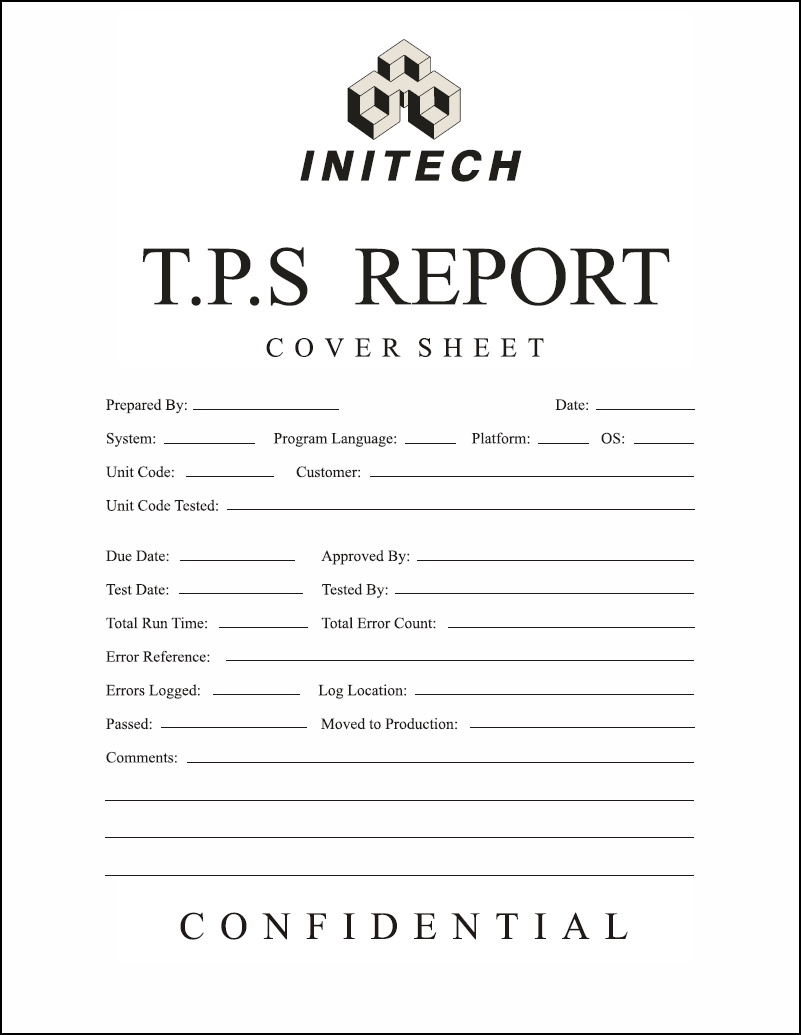
A mock-up of a TPS report cover sheet, created for the movie Office Space

A TPS report ("test program set") is a fictional document from the 1999 comedy film Office Space.

In the movie, multiple managers and coworkers inquire about an error that protagonist Peter Gibbons (played by Ron Livingston) makes in omitting a cover sheet to send with his "TPS reports". It is used by Gibbons as an example that he has eight different bosses to whom he directly reports. According to the film's writer and director Mike Judge, the abbreviation stood for "Test Program Set" in the movie.

== In popular culture ==
After Office Space, "TPS report" has come to connote pointless, mindless paperwork, and an example of "literacy practices" in the work environment that are "meaningless exercises imposed upon employees by an inept and uncaring management" and "relentlessly mundane and enervating".

=== Other references and allusions ===
- In Ralph Breaks the Internet, a TPS report is visibly hanging in one of the accounting department cubicles during Ralph's viral video montage. While Test Procedure Specification reports are not functionally relevant within accounting, this usage shows how the term has grown to symbolize all kinds of meaningless memoranda.
- In Borderlands 2, a legendary weapon is named the "Actualizer" with a flavor text description of "We need to talk about your DPS reports", parodying the corporate term by replacing it with the common gaming abbreviation for "Damage Per Second".
- In The Mandalorian, TPS reports are mentioned in the episode "Chapter 15: The Believer" as work to do by the character Migs Mayfeld when attempting to avoid an imperial officer, in a reference to Office Space.
- The TV series The Family Man features a scene in series 2, episode 1 in which the manager of the protagonist asks him to "start thinking about your TPS reports!", in amongst other apparent references to Office Space.
- In Terry Tate: Office Linebacker, Terry Tate reprimands an employee, Bridget, of Felcher & Sons regarding the need for a cover sheet on TPS reports. The office setting of this commercial lends itself kindly to the use of this document as a comedy aid and a nod to the similar satirical comedy Office Space.
- In the television series Lost, during Episode 4 of season 1, John Locke’s character is told to complete his TPS reports. In this episode he is working a desk job, and is scolded by his boss for not completing the reports on time.
