= Kampalapura =

Coordinates: 12.335401°N 76.158353°E

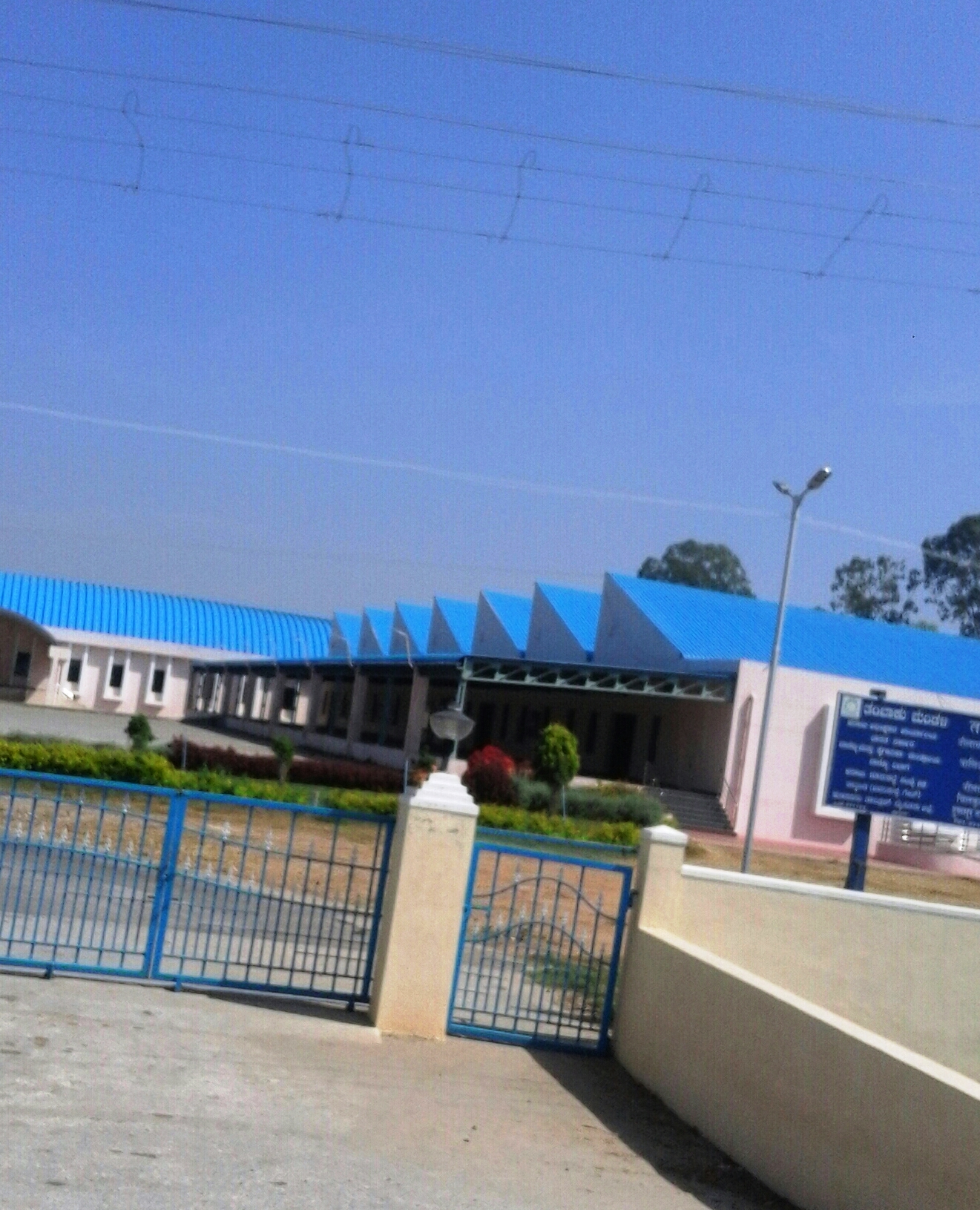
Tobacco Board

Kampalapura is a village in Mysore district of Karnataka state in India.

== Location ==
Kampalapura is located between Mysuru and Madikeri cities at latitude 12.335401 and longitude 76.158353. It is also sometimes referred to as Kamplapura.

== Villages and suburbs ==
Periyapatna. 7 km Kushalnagar 28 km Bettadapura 22 km Ramanathapura 40 km Saligrama 38.5 km Hunasuru 16 km Gonikoppa 34 km Virajpete 50 km

== Demographics ==
The population of Kampalapura village is 4,721, and there were 1,112 families identified in the last census.

== Economy ==
The economy of the village is mostly agrarian. The major crops are tobacco, ragi, maize, areca nut and rice.

== Educational organisations ==
- Government Primary School, Kamplapura.
- Government Urdu Primary School,
- Government High School,
- Sri Naga vidya sametha.
- MR Noble English medium school.

== Post office ==
There is a post office in the village and the pin-code is 571107.

== Image gallery ==
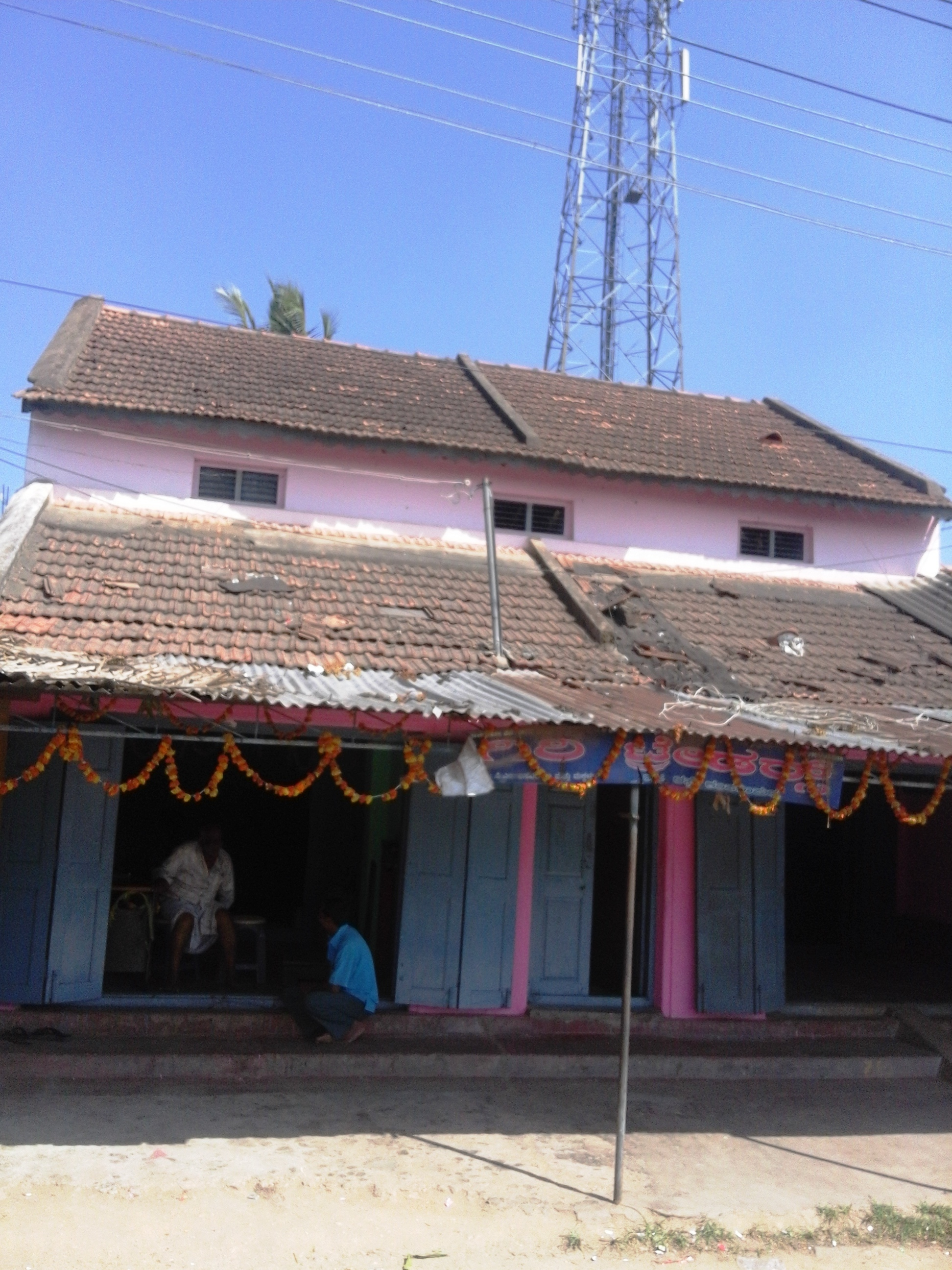
Old building in Kampalapura

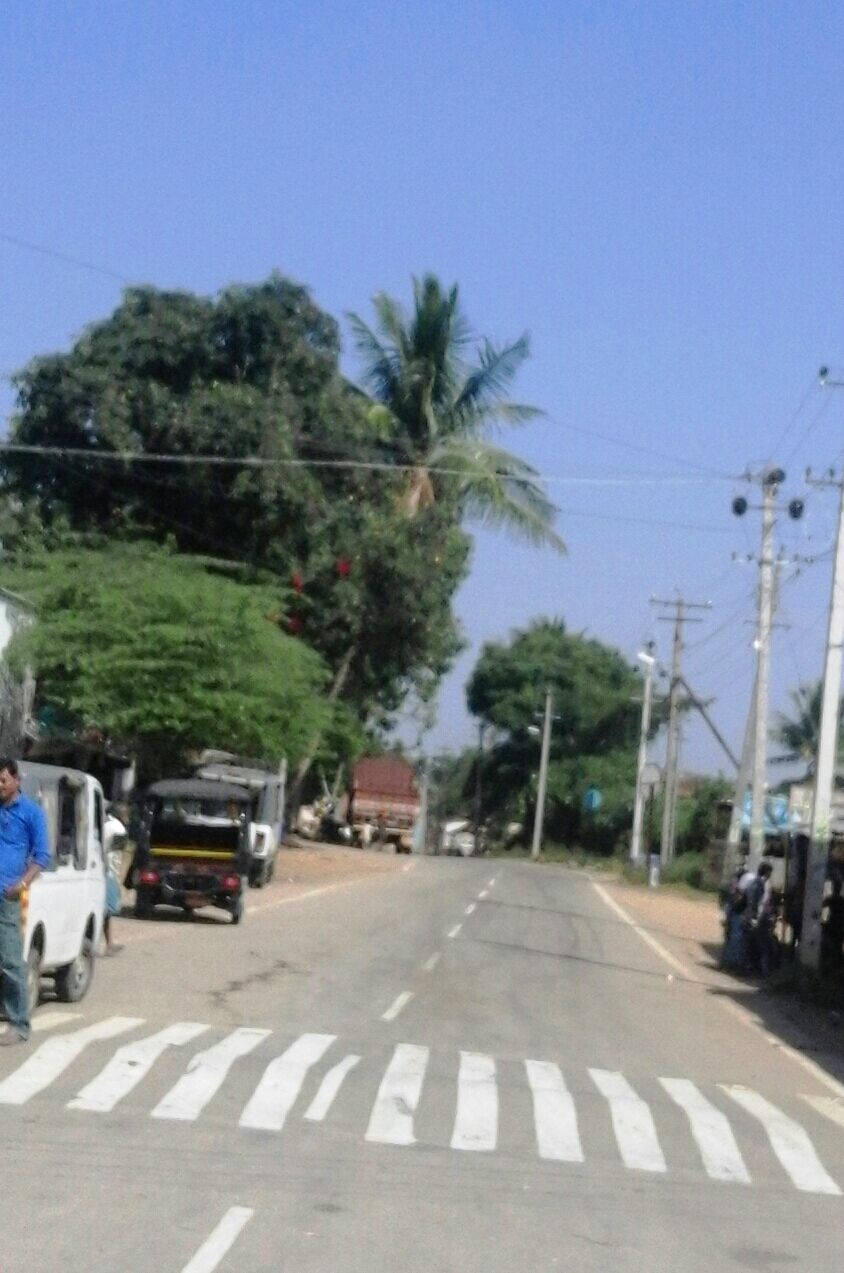
Kampalapura village
