= Gary Cole =

American actor (born 1956)

- Gary Cole at the 2nd Annual Carney Awards (2016)
- Born: Gary Michael Cole; September 20, 1956 (age 70); Park Ridge, Illinois, U.S.
- Education: Illinois State University (BFA)
- Occupation: Actor
- Years active: 1983–present
- Spouses: Teddi Siddall (m. 1992; died 2018); Michelle Knapp (m. 2021)
- Children: 1

Gary Michael Cole (born September 20, 1956) is an American actor. He began his professional acting career on stage at Chicago's Steppenwolf Theatre Company in 1985. His breakout role was playing Jack 'Nighthawk' Killian in the NBC series Midnight Caller (1988–1991).

Further prominent television roles include Sheriff Lucas Buck in American Gothic (1995–1996), Vice President Bob Russell in The West Wing (2003–2006), Kurt McVeigh in both The Good Wife (2010–2016) and The Good Fight (2017–2022), Kent Davison in Veep (2013–2019), and Special Agent Alden Parker in NCIS (2021–present). A cast member of many animated productions, Cole's voice roles include Harvey Birdman in Harvey Birdman, Attorney at Law (2000–2007, 2018), Principal Shepherd in Family Guy (2000–present), Dr. James Possible in Kim Possible (2002–2007), Mayor Fred Jones Sr. in Scooby-Doo! Mystery Incorporated (2010–2013) and Sergeant Bosco in Bob's Burgers (2012–present).

His most notable film roles are Mike Brady in The Brady Bunch Movie (1995) and Bill Lumbergh in Office Space (1999). Other film appearances include In the Line of Fire (1993), A Simple Plan (1998), One Hour Photo (2002), Dodgeball: A True Underdog Story (2004), Talladega Nights: The Ballad of Ricky Bobby (2006) and Pineapple Express (2008).

== Early life ==
Gary Michael Cole was born on September 20, 1956, in Park Ridge, Illinois, and raised in nearby Rolling Meadows. His father, Robert, was a municipal finance director, and his mother, Margaret or "Peggy", was a school administrative assistant. Cole has an older sister, Nancy.

While attending Rolling Meadows High School, Cole made his acting debut as Snoopy in a high school production of Clark Gesner's Peanuts musical You're a Good Man, Charlie Brown. Cole attended Illinois State University, where he studied theater as a classmate with fellow future actors Laurie Metcalf and John Malkovich.

== Career ==
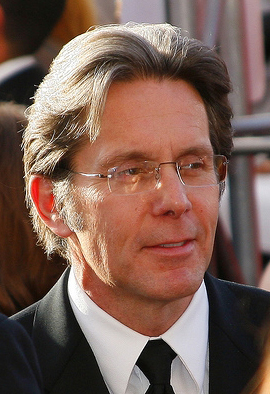
Cole in 2009

Cole began his professional career in 1983 as a stage actor in Chicago, where he joined the ensemble of the Steppenwolf Theatre Company in 1985. He has also appeared in several off-Broadway productions in New York City. Some of Cole's early roles included playing accused Army triple-murderer Capt Jeffrey MacDonald in the mini-series Fatal Vision (1984), and an assistant football coach in the film Lucas (1986). Between 1988 and 1991, Cole became popular on TV for playing the part of Jack "Nighthawk" Killian in the series Midnight Caller. One of his most notable roles in 1991 was as Lt. Col. George A. Custer in the much acclaimed television film Son of the Morning Star.

Cole played Secret Service Agent Bill Watts in the film In the Line of Fire (1993). He then played The Brady Bunch patriarch Mike Brady in the film The Brady Bunch Movie (1995), the sequel A Very Brady Sequel (1996), and the television film The Brady Bunch in the White House (2002). He played an FBI Agent in the film A Simple Plan (1998). Cole starred in the film Office Space (1999), in which he portrayed the micromanaging office supervisor Bill Lumbergh. When asked about the oft-quoted character, Cole said:

Everyone in Office Space thought that this movie had died. So that's how I knew the movie was actually some kind of success because people were coming up doing some lines from the movie ... It never gets old because it reminds you that something you did had some impact. You could work your whole career and have nothing like that last that long.

Cole has done voice work on several animated series (Family Guy; Kim Possible; Scooby-Doo! Mystery Incorporated; Harvey Birdman, Attorney at Law; Archer) and had a recurring role on the drama The West Wing as Vice President Bob Russell. He also starred as Captain Matthew Gideon on the short-lived Babylon 5 spin-off Crusade, and had notable guest appearances on Law & Order: Special Victims Unit and Arrested Development. He also played Joe Maxwell on DCOM Cadet Kelly and appeared as real-life astronaut Edgar Mitchell in HBO's recreation of Project Apollo, From the Earth to the Moon.

Cole starred as Lieutenant Conrad Rose on the TNT series Wanted, he is also the voice of the title character on the Adult Swim series Harvey Birdman, Attorney at Law, and starred as Sheriff Lucas Buck on the one season 1995 show, American Gothic. Cole also played Bill Owens, Sy Parrish's (Robin Williams) boss, in the film One Hour Photo (2002). He also appeared in the films Dodgeball: A True Underdog Story (2004), The Ring Two (2005), Talladega Nights (2006), American Pastime (2007), and Forever Strong (2008).

Cole played Katherine Mayfair's ex-husband Wayne on Desperate Housewives and also played the dangerous drug lord Ted Jones in Pineapple Express (2008) with Seth Rogen and James Franco. He also appeared in an episode from the third season of the USA Network series Psych as S.W.A.T. commander Cameron Luntz.

In 2008, Cole appeared on Chuck as Sarah's con-artist father (in "Chuck Versus the DeLorean"), a role which he reprised in 2011 (in "Chuck Versus the Wedding Planner"). He also appeared in the fifth season of HBO's Entourage playing Ari Gold's old pal Andrew Klein for a three-episode story arc prior to joining the regular cast in the sixth season.

He played ballistics expert Kurt McVeigh on The Good Wife and on The Good Fight. On both shows, he played opposite Christine Baranski, who portrayed lawyer Diane Lockhart.

Cole had a guest-appearance on the fourth season of the HBO series True Blood, playing Sookie Stackhouse's grandfather.

In 2011, Cole joined Fox's comedy pilot Tagged, but the series was not picked up. That same year, he played Henry O'Hare in the Easter comedy film Hop.

In 2013, Cole began a recurring role on Suits as Cameron Dennis, the former mentor of Harvey Specter, one of the show's main characters. Also in 2013, Cole began a major recurring role as Kent Davison on the HBO comedy series Veep, joining the main cast at the start of the show's second season. In 2014, he was nominated for the Primetime Emmy Award for Outstanding Guest Actor in a Comedy Series for his work in season three. Additionally, Cole was nominated with his fellow cast members for the Screen Actors Guild Award for Outstanding Performance by an Ensemble in a Comedy Series for seasons 2, 3, 4, and 5 before ultimately winning the award in 2017 for season 6.

From June to July 2026, Cole returned to the stage in Chicago's Steppenwolf Theatre Company in Mia Chung's Catch As Catch Can, where he played the dual roles of Roberta Lavecchia/Robbie Lavecchia. In September of 2026, Cole reprised his character of Harvey Birdman as a part of Adult Swim's Anniversary Special.

Cole currently portrays Supervisory Special Agent Alden Parker on NCIS, and provides the voices of Sergeant Boscoe on Bob's Burgers and Principal Shepherd on Family Guy. He appears in triplicate as 10 Minutes, 10 Days, and 10 Years in the Future Spokesguy in Kabbage's 2019 commercial campaign.

== Personal life ==
Cole married actress Teddi Siddall on March 8, 1992. They have one daughter, who is autistic. Siddall filed for divorce in June 2017. Cole married interior designer Michelle Knapp in August, 2021.

== Filmography ==
=== Film ===
Year	Title	Role	Notes
1985	To Live and Die in L.A.	Suspect chased by Richard Chance	Uncredited
1986	Lucas	Assistant Coach	
1990	The Old Man and the Sea	Tom Pruitt	
1993	In the Line of Fire	Secret Service Agent in Charge Bill Watts	
1995	The Brady Bunch Movie	Mike Brady	
1996	A Very Brady Sequel	Mike Brady	
1997	Santa Fe	Paul Thomas	
1997	Gang Related	DEA Agent Richard Simms	
1997	Cyclops, Baby	Manks	
1998	A Simple Plan	Vernon Bokovsky / FBI Agent Neil Baxter	
1998	Kiss the Sky	Marty	
1998	I'll Be Home for Christmas	Jake's Dad	
1999	Office Space	Bill Lumbergh	
2000	The Gift	David Duncan	
2001	The Rising Place	Avery Hodge	
2002	One Hour Photo	Bill Owens	
2002	I Spy	Agent Carlos	
2004	Win a Date with Tad Hamilton!	Henry Futch	
2004	Dodgeball: A True Underdog Story	"Cotton" McKnight	
2005	The Ring Two	Martin Savide	
2005	Mozart and the Whale	Wallace	
2005	Cry Wolf	Mr. Matthews	
2006	Talladega Nights: The Ballad of Ricky Bobby	Reese Bobby	
2007	My Wife Is Retarded	Dr. Heichman	Short film
2007	American Pastime	Billy Burrell	
2007	Breach	Rich Garces	
2007	Goodnight Vagina	Dr. Milstein	Short film
2008	Say Hello to Stan Talmadge	Stan Talmadge	
2008	Conspiracy	Rhodes	
2008	Pineapple Express	Ted Jones	
2008	Forever Strong	Coach Larry Gelwix	
2009	Extract	Bar Patron	Uncredited
2009	The Joneses	Larry	
2010	DC Showcase: The Spectre	Jim Corrigan / Spectre	Voice, short film
2010	Batman: Under the Red Hood	"Bobo", James "Jim" Gordon, Shot, Guard	Voice, direct-to-video
2010	Immortality Bites	Dr. Levine	
2011	Hop	Henry O'Hare	
2011	The Chicago 8	Bill Kunstler	
2011	The Last Rites of Joe May	Lenny	
2013	Vamp U	Arthur Levine	
2014	Date and Switch	Dwayne	
2014	Tammy	Earl	
2014	Cotton	Clay Peaks	Hollywood Reel Independent Film Festival Award for Best Actor
2014	The Town That Dreaded Sundown	Chief Deputy Hank Tillman	
2015	Divine Access	Reverend Guy Roy Davis	
2015	Christmas Eve	Dr. Roberts	
2015	The Bronze	Stan Greggory	
2016	Hot Air	Aviator	
2017	Small Crimes	Dan Pleasant	
2017	Scooby-Doo! Shaggy's Showdown	Rafe	Voice, direct-to-video
2018	Blockers	Ron	
2018	Under the Eiffel Tower	Gerard	
2018	Unbroken: Path to Redemption	Dr. George Bailey	
2018	Seven in Heaven	Mr. Wallace	
2019	The Art of Racing in the Rain	Don Kitch	
2019	Married Young	Aaron	
2020	Darkness Falls	Mark Witver	
2021	Batman: Death in the Family	James Gordon, Two-Face, Reporter #4	Voice, short film
2022	The Bob's Burgers Movie	Sergeant Bosco	Voice
2022	Beavis and Butt-Head Do the Universe	Phil Mattison	Voice

=== Television ===
Year	Title	Role	Notes
1983	Heart of Steel	Lee	Television film
1984	Fatal Vision	Captain Jeffrey MacDonald, MD	Miniseries
1984	American Playhouse	Man with Xmas Tree	Episode: "A Matter of Principle"
1985	First Steps	Manny	Television film
1985	The Twilight Zone	Daniel Gaddis	Episode: "Her Pilgrim Soul"
1986	Vital Signs	Dr. Hayward	Television film
1986	Miami Vice	Jackson Crane	Episode: "Trust Fund Pirates"
1986	Jack and Mike	Chris Sykes	Episode: "Pilot"
1987	Moonlighting	Alan McClafferty	2 episodes
1987	Echoes in the Darkness	Jack Holtz	Television film
1988–1991	Midnight Caller	Jack 'Nighthawk' Killian	61 episodes
1989	Those She Left Behind	Scott Grimes	Television film
1990	The Old Man and the Sea	Tom Pruitt	Television film
1991	Son of the Morning Star	George Armstrong Custer	Television film
1993	The Switch	Larry McAfee	Television film
1993	When Love Kills: The Seduction of John Hearn	John Hearn	Television film
1994	A Time to Heal	Jay Barton	Television film
1994	Twilight Zone: Rod Serling's Lost Classics	James	Television film
1994	Fall from Grace	Major Tom O'Neill	Television film
1995–1996	American Gothic	Sheriff Lucas Buck	22 episodes
1996	For My Daughter's Honor	Pete Nash	Television film
1997	Lies He Told	Dave	Television film
1998	Dead Man's Gun	Travis Everett Thornberry	Episode: "The Photographer"
1998	The Outer Limits	Detective Ray Venable	Episode: "Criminal Nature"
1998	From the Earth to the Moon	Edgar Mitchell	Episode: "For Miles and Miles"
1999	Crusade	Captain Matthew Gideon	13 episodes
1999	Chicken Soup for the Soul	Dad	Episode: "Where's My Kiss, Then?"
1999–2004	The Practice	Solomon Tager, Attorney Brian Seabury	3 episodes
2000	What About Joan	Justin	Episode: "You Can't Go Home Again"
2000	Family Law	Alan	Episode: "Human Error"
2000	Batman Beyond	Zeta	Voice, episode: "Zeta"
2000	Touched by an Angel	Charlie Radcliff	Episode: "Pandora's Box"
2000	Frasier	Luke Parker	Episode: "The New Friend"
2000–2007	Harvey Birdman, Attorney at Law	Harvey Birdman, additional voices	Voice, 39 episodes
2000–present	Family Guy	Principal Shepherd, additional voices	Voice, 104 episodes
2001	Neurotic Tendencies		Pilot
2001	Justice League	J. Allen Carter	Voice, episode: "Secret Origins"
2002, 2004	Teamo Supremo	Mr. Vague	Voice, 2 episodes
2002	American Adventure	Chuck	Television film
2002	Cadet Kelly	Brigadier General Joe "Sir" Maxwell	Television film
2002	The Brady Bunch in the White House	Mike Brady	Television film
2002–2003	Family Affair	Bill Davis	15 episodes
2002–2007	Kim Possible	Dr. James Possible	Voice, 40 episodes
2003	Criminology 101	Roy Franks	Pilot
2003	Hack	Johnny Scanlon	Episode: "Brothers in Arms"
2003	Monk	Dexter Larson	Episode: "Mr. Monk Meets the Playboy"
2003	Karen Sisco	Konner	2 episodes
2003	Kim Possible: A Sitch in Time	Dr. James Possible	Voice, television film
2003–2006	The West Wing	Vice President Bob Russell	21 episodes
2004	Pop Rocks	Jerry "Dagger" Harden	Television film
2004	Law & Order: Special Victims Unit	Xander Henry	Episode: "Brotherhood"
2005	Kim Possible Movie: So the Drama	Dr. James Possible	Voice, television film
2005	Wanted	Lieutenant Conrad Rose	13 episodes
2005	King of the Hill	Vance Gilbert	Voice, episode: "Harlottown"
2006	That Guy	Gary	Pilot
2006	Company Town	Martin Amberson	Pilot
2006	Arrested Development	CIA Agent Richard Shaw	Episode: "Exit Strategy"
2007	The Dukes of Hazzard: The Beginning	The Balladeer	Voice, television film
2007	Shark	Christian Chambers	Episode: "Blind Trust"
2007	Supernatural	Brad Redding	Episode: "Hollywood Babylon"
2008	Good Behavior	Dean West	Unaired series
2008	12 Miles of Bad Road	Jerry Shakespeare	6 episodes
2008	Desperate Housewives	Wayne Davis	6 episodes
2008	Psych	Commander Cameron Lutz	Episode: "Gus Walks Into a Bank"
2008–2010	Entourage	Andrew Klein	12 episodes
2008, 2011	Chuck	Jack Burton	2 episodes
2009	The Cleaner	Davis Durham	2 episodes
2009	Numb3rs	Shepard Crater	Episode: "Hangman"
2010	The Good Guys	Frank Savage	2 episodes
2010	The Closer	Major Edward Dorcet	Episode: "War Zone"
2010	Uncle Nigel	Nigel	Pilot
2010	Funny or Die Presents	Lead FBI Agent	Episode: "201"
2010–2012	The Penguins of Madagascar	Commissioner McSlade	Voice, 4 episodes
2010–2013	Scooby-Doo! Mystery Incorporated	Mayor Fred Jones Sr., additional voices	Voice, 21 episodes
2010–2016	The Good Wife	Kurt McVeigh	14 episodes
2011	True Blood	Earl Stackhouse	Episode: "She's Not There"
2011	Curb Your Enthusiasm	Joe O'Donnell	Episode: "The Divorce"
2011	Ricochet	Judge Cato Laird	Television film
2011	Tagged	James Percy	Pilot
2011	Pound Puppies	Slick	Voice, episode: "I Never Barked for My Father"
2011–2013; 2016, 2019	Suits	Cameron Dennis	10 episodes
2012	An Officer and a Murderer	Colonel Russell Williams	Television film
2012	Hart of Dixie	Dr. Ethan Hart	2 episodes
2012	Scruples	Royce Franklin	Pilot
2012	30 Rock	Roger	Episode: "Unwindulax"
2012	Royal Pains	Simon Braddock	Episode: "Who's Your Daddy"
2012	Wedding Band	Jack	Episode: "We Are Family"
2012	The List	Chief Inspector Bob McKinnon	Pilot
2012–present	Bob's Burgers	Sergeant Bosco	Voice, 13 episodes
2013–2019	Veep	Kent Davison	55 episodes Screen Actors Guild Award for Outstanding Performance by an Ensemble in a Comedy Series (2017); Nominated — Primetime Emmy Award for Outstanding Guest Actor in a Comedy Series (2014); Nominated — Screen Actors Guild Award for Outstanding Performance by an Ensemble in a Comedy Series (2013–2016)
2014	Phineas and Ferb	Principal Lang	Voice, episode: "Doof 101"
2014	The Legend of Korra	Dai Li Sergeant, Rich Man	Voice, 2 episodes
2014–2015	Archer	Special Agent Hawley	Voice, 6 episodes
2014–2021	The Tom and Jerry Show	"The Cat and Mouse Detectives" Narrator	Voice, 38 episodes
2014–2021	The Tom and Jerry Show	Baseball Announcer	Voice, Episode: "Ball of Fire"
2014–2017	Penn Zero: Part-Time Hero	Brock Zero	Voice, 14 episodes
2015	Mr. Robinson	Neville Rex	Episode: "Flesh for Fantasy"
2015	Rick and Morty	Alien Doctor	Voice, episode: "Interdimensional Cable 2: Tempting Fate"
2015–2017	F Is for Family	Roger Dunbarton	Voice, 6 episodes
2016	Unforgettable	Clay Tendler	Episode: "Bad Company"
2016	Angel from Hell	Stephen Williams	Episode: "Believe Me, Part 2"
2016	We Bare Bears	CEO	Voice, episode: "Fashion Bears"
2016	Justice League Action	Black Adam	Voice, 2 episodes
2016	Angie Tribeca	Professor Everett Lamereau	Episode: "Pilot"
2016–2017	Mercy Street	James Green Sr.	12 episodes
2017–2018	Stretch Armstrong and the Flex Fighters	Mark Armstrong	Voice, 10 episodes
2017–2022	The Good Fight	Kurt McVeigh	24 episodes
2018	The Venture Bros.	Professor Von Helping	Voice, episode: "The High Cost of Loathing"
2018	Harvey Birdman: Attorney General	Harvey Birdman	Voice, television special
2018–2019	Trolls: The Beat Goes On!	Sky Toronto	Voice, 12 episodes
2018–2019	Chicago Fire	Fire Commissioner Carl Grissom	12 episodes
2019	Fam	Freddy	7 episodes
2019	Love, Death & Robots	The Inspector	Voice, episode: "The Dump"
2019–2021	Mixed-ish	Harrison Jackson III	36 episodes
2019, 2022	American Dad!	Ted Robinson	Voice, 2 episodes
2019–2025	Big Mouth	Edward MacDell	Voice, 10 episodes
2020	Star Trek: Lower Decks	Leonardo da Vinci Hologram	Voice, episode: "Crisis Point"
2021	Q-Force	Dirk Chunley	Voice, 10 episodes
2021–2022	Inside Job	Male Cop, Sitcom Dad	Voice, 2 episodes
2021–present	NCIS	Alden Parker	Main role
2022	NCIS: Hawaiʻi	Alden Parker	3 episodes
2023	NCIS: Los Angeles	Alden Parker	Episode: "A Long Time Coming"
2023	White House Plumbers	Mark Felt	Episode: "The Beverly Hills Burglary"
2023	Waco: The Aftermath	Gordon Novel	5 episodes
2023	Agent Elvis	Richard Nixon	Voice, episode: "Maximum Density"
2023–2024	Velma	Lamont Rogers	Voice, 13 episodes
2025	Krapopolis	King of the Valley	Voice, episode: "Don Tyxote"
2025	A Man on the Inside	Brad Vinick	4 episodes
2026	Robot Chicken Adult Swim Special	Harvey Birdman	Voice, Television film

=== Video games ===
Year	Title	Role
2008	Harvey Birdman: Attorney at Law	Harvey Birdman, Judge Hiram Mightor
2016	Hitman	Himself
