= Michael Rotenberg =

Canadian film producer

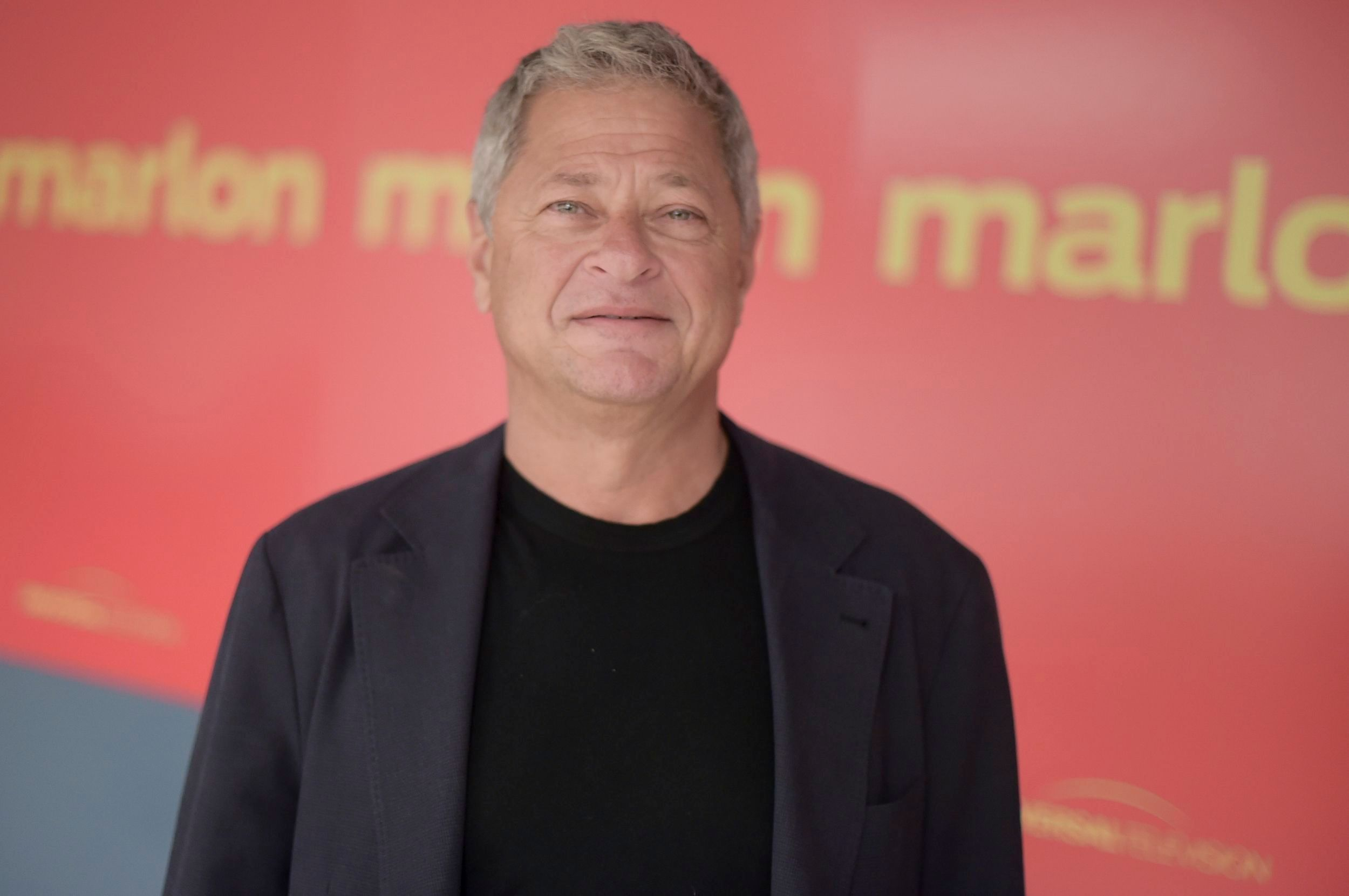
Michael Rotenberg, co-founder of 3 Arts Entertainment

Michael Rotenberg is a Canadian producer and entertainment manager.

== Early life and education ==
Born to a Jewish family, Rotenburg grew up in Toronto, Ontario and studied law at the University of Windsor, He was admitted to practice in Upper Canada as well as in California. He worked in business affairs at The Samuel Goldwyn Company, and as an attorney at Loeb & Loeb and Gipson, Hoffman. He transitioned into management to work with Sandy Gallin.

== Career ==
In 1991, Rotenberg, alongside Erwin Stoff and Howard Klein, co-founded 3 Arts Entertainment, a talent management and television film/production company. In 2003, the company received a television deal with 20th Century Fox Television and in 2018, Lionsgate acquired a majority stake in the company.

Rotenberg has produced television shows including King of the Hill, Everybody Hates Chris, It's Always Sunny in Philadelphia, Insecure, Silicon Valley and American Vandal.

Rotenberg has been nominated for a Grammy 14 times. Rotenberg has won an award for Outstanding Variety, Music or Comedy Special as for HBO’s Chris Rock: Bring the Pain in 1997 and Outstanding Animated Program (For Programming One Hour or Less) as executive producer for FOX’s King of The Hill in 1999.

He is the executive producer on Apple TV+’s Mythic Quest: Raven’s Banquet, FX’s It’s Always Sunny In Philadelphia, NBC's Lopez vs Lopez, Paramount TV+'s Beavis & Butthead and Amazon Freevee series Sprung.

He also produced the animated film that is currently streaming on Paramount+, Beavis and Butt-Head Do the Universe. Other films he has produced include Encino Man, Office Space and Son-In-Law. He also serves as executive producer on the following upcoming television shows: Apple TV+'s Manhunt, Paramount TV+'s reboot of Beavis and Butthead, and Paramount TV+ in collaboration with Comedy Central's reboot of Everybody Still Hates Chris.

3 Arts has produced television shows such as The Office, Parks and Recreation, The Mindy Project, Brooklyn Nine-Nine, Unbreakable Kimmy Schmidt, American Vandal, The Good Place as well as produced films including Edge of Tomorrow, Unbroken, Constantine, The Devil’s Advocate, I Am Legend, Office Space, The Matrix, and 13 Hours: The Secret Soldiers of Benghazi.

== Filmography ==
=== Film ===
| Year | Title | Role |
|---|---|---|
| 1992 | Encino Man | Co-executive producer |
| 1993 | Son in Law | Producer |
| 1994 | In the Army Now | Producer |
| 1996 | Bio-Dome | Executive producer |
| 1997 | Beverly Hills Ninja | Executive producer |
| 1999 | Office Space | Producer |
| 2001 | Double Take | Executive producer |
| 2001 | Down to Earth | Producer |
| 2001 | Pootie Tang | Executive producer |
| 2003 | Head of State | Producer |
| 2006 | Man About Town | Producer |
| 2007 | Reign Over Me | Producer |
| 2008 | The Onion Movie | Producer |
| 2009 | Extract | Producer |
| 2014 | Perfect Sisters | Executive producer |

=== Television ===
| Year | Title | Role |
|---|---|---|
| 1992 | Richard Jeni: Platypus Man | Executive producer |
| 1992 | Louis in St. Louis | Executive producer |
| 1992 | Howie | Executive producer |
| 1995 | Platypus Man | Producer |
| 1996 | Chris Rock: Bring the Pain | Executive producer |
| 1996 | A Weekend in the Country | Executive producer |
| 1997 | Mr. Rhodes | Executive producer |
| 1997 | The Chris Rock Show | Executive producer |
| 1997–2009 | King of the Hill | Executive producer |
| 1998 | The Howie Mandel Show | Executive producer |
| 1998 | Chris Rock: Bigger & Blacker | Executive producer |
| 2000 | Dave Chappelle: Killin' Them Softly | Executive producer |
| 1998–2002 | The Hughleys | Executive producer |
| 2005–present | It's Always Sunny in Philadelphia | Executive producer |
| 2005–2009 | Everybody Hates Chris | Executive producer |
| 2011 | Beavis and Butt-Head | Executive producer |
| 2014 | Saint George | Executive producer |
| 2016 | The 5th Quarter | Executive producer |
| 2014–2016 | Silicon Valley | Executive producer |
| 2016–2021 | Insecure | Executive producer |
| 2016 | Those Who Can't | Executive producer |
| 2016–2020 | Man With a Plan | Executive producer |
| 2017–2018 | Superior Donuts | Executive producer |
| 2017–2018 | Marlon | Executive producer |
| 2017–2018 | American Vandal | Executive producer |
| 2018–2019 | Happy Together | Executive producer |

=== Awards ===
| Year | Award | Category | Show | Result |
|---|---|---|---|---|
| 1994 | CableACE Award | Stand-Up Comedy Special | Richard Jeni: Platypus Man | Winner |
| 1997 | Primetime Emmy Awards | Primetime Emmy Award for Outstanding Variety, Music or Comedy Special | The Chris Rock Show: Bring the Pain | Winner |
| 1999 | Primetime Emmy Awards | Primetime Creative Arts Emmy Award for Outstanding Animated Program | King of the Hill | Winner |
| 2015 | Critic’s Choice Awards | Best Comedy Series | Silicon Valley | Winner |
| 2017 | Peabody Award | Insecure | | Winner |
