= Milton (cartoon) =

Series of animated shorts

Milton is a series of animated shorts created by Mike Judge.

== Background ==
They aired on Saturday Night Live in the mid-1990s and, like Judge's other early shorts, appeared on MTV's Liquid Television in the early 1990s. In the cartoon shorts, all voices are provided by Judge. The 1999 film Office Space was based upon the cartoons, and featured actor Stephen Root in the role of Milton Waddams. Although Milton was the title character from the shorts, the role was a supporting character in the Office Space feature film, as was his boss, Bill Lumbergh (played by actor Gary Cole in Office Space). Milton traveled to different locations despite being consistently late for his taxis to take him there.
