= Office Space =

1999 film by Mike Judge

- Theatrical release poster
- Directed by: Mike Judge
- Screenplay by: Mike Judge
- Based on: Milton by Mike Judge
- Produced by: Daniel Rappaport; Michael Rotenberg; Mike Judge (Note: Uncredited)
- Starring: Ron Livingston; Jennifer Aniston; Stephen Root; Gary Cole
- Cinematography: Tim Suhrstedt
- Edited by: David Rennie
- Music by: John Frizzell
- Production companies: Judgmental Films; 3 Arts Entertainment; Cubicle Inc.
- Distributed by: 20th Century Fox
- Release date: February 19, 1999
- Running time: 89 minutes
- Country: United States
- Language: English
- Budget: $10 million
- Box office: $12.2 million

Office Space is a 1999 American satirical black comedy film written and directed by Mike Judge. It satirizes the office work life of a typical 1990s software company, focusing on a handful of individuals weary of their jobs. It stars Ron Livingston, Jennifer Aniston, Gary Cole, Stephen Root, David Herman, Ajay Naidu, and Diedrich Bader.

Office Space was filmed in Dallas and Austin, Texas. It is based on Judge's Milton cartoon series and was his first foray into live-action filmmaking. The film was Judge's second full-length motion picture release, following Beavis and Butt-Head Do America. It was released in theaters on February 19, 1999, by 20th Century Fox. Its sympathetic depiction of ordinary information technology workers garnered a cult following within that field, but it also addresses themes familiar to white-collar employees and the workforce in general. It received critical acclaim but was a box office disappointment, making $12.5 million on a $10 million production budget; however, it sold well on home video, and has become a cult film.

Several aspects of the film have become Internet memes. A scene in which the three main characters systematically destroy a dysfunctional printer has been widely parodied. Swingline introduced a red stapler to its product line after the character Milton used one painted in that color in the film. Judge's 2009 film Extract is also set in an office and was intended as a companion piece to Office Space.

== Plot ==
Peter Gibbons is a frustrated and unmotivated programmer who works at software company Initech. Unprepared to stand up to his highly critical girlfriend, Anne, he has become infatuated with local waitress Joanna, but is afraid to speak to her. He is friends with co-workers Samir Nagheenanajar, who hates that no one can pronounce his last name, and Michael Bolton, who hates having the same name as the famous singer. Other co-workers include Milton Waddams, a meek collator who mumbles to himself and is mostly ignored by the rest of the office, and Tom Smykowski, a jaded product manager who is routinely scared of being fired. The staff suffers under callous management, especially from vice president Bill Lumbergh, a tedious micromanager who humiliates Milton and demands Peter work almost every weekend.

Anne persuades Peter to attend a hypnotherapy session led by Dr. Swanson, who hypnotizes Peter and tells him to feel relaxed and stop caring about his job until he snaps his fingers. However, Swanson suddenly dies of a heart attack before snapping Peter out of it. Peter sleeps soundly through the next day, ignoring phone calls from Lumbergh and Anne, who angrily breaks up with him while confirming his suspicions that she was cheating on him.

Business consultants Bob Slydell and Bob Porter—jointly known as "the Bobs"—are brought in to help the company downsize, and Peter begins dating Joanna. She works at a Chotchkie's restaurant where she is required to wear "pieces of flair": buttons allowing employees to "express themselves". Her boss Stan hassles her for only wearing the required minimum of 15.

Peter shows up to work and casually disregards office protocol, stealing Lumbergh's parking space, violating the dress code, and removing a cubicle wall that blocks his view out the window. Impressed by Peter's insights into Initech's problems, the consultants promote him despite Lumbergh's misgivings while laying off Michael, Samir, and Tom. While attempting to do the same to Milton, they learn that he was laid off five years prior but was not notified and is still receiving his salary due to a payroll glitch. They stop Milton's salary payments without telling him, while Lumbergh confiscates his beloved red Swingline stapler and repeatedly relocates his desk, eventually down to the basement.

Tired of their own mistreatment, Peter, Michael, and Samir take revenge by infecting Initech's accounting system with a computer virus designed by Michael to divert huge numbers of fractions of pennies into a bank account. On Michael and Samir's last day, Peter steals a frequently malfunctioning printer, which the three destroy in a field. They also learn that Tom attempted suicide prior to being laid off, but then changed his mind, only to get into an accident that resulted in him winning a large amount of money from a lawsuit. At a party at Tom's house, Peter hears rumors from a colleague that Joanna slept with Lumbergh. When Joanna affirms this, a heated exchange leads to them breaking up. Frustrated with her job, Joanna quits when Stan gives another lecture about her minimal "flair".

On Monday, Peter discovers that a bug in Michael's code has caused the virus to steal over $300,000 across the weekend, which guarantees they will be caught and sent to federal prison. Unable to conceal the crime, Peter decides to accept full responsibility, writing a confession and slipping it under Lumbergh's office door after hours, along with traveler's checks for the stolen money. Peter learns that the "Lumbergh" with whom Joanna slept was Ron Lumbergh, another software engineer unrelated to Bill Lumbergh. He meets Joanna, who has started working at another restaurant, to apologize, and they reconcile.

The next morning, Peter drives to Initech to turn himself in, but the problem has solved itself: Milton has committed arson and burned down the building as revenge against the company. With the evidence of his crime destroyed, Peter begins his new job working in construction with his neighbor Lawrence, while Samir and Michael join Initech's rival, Initrode. Milton escapes to Mexico after finding the traveler's checks, and continues to be denied respect there.

== Cast ==
- Ron Livingston as Peter Gibbons, a disgruntled programmer at Initech
- Jennifer Aniston as Joanna, a waitress at a Chotchkie's restaurant
- Stephen Root as Milton Waddams, a timid, mistreated Initech collator
- Gary Cole as Bill Lumbergh, vice president of Initech
- John C. McGinley as Bob Slydell, a business consultant specializing in efficiency
- David Herman as Michael Bolton, one of Peter's friends and coworkers
- Ajay Naidu as Samir Nagheenanajar, one of Peter's friends and coworkers
- Diedrich Bader as Lawrence, Peter's uncouth friend and next-door neighbor who works in construction
- Michael McShane as Dr. Swanson, an occupational hypnotherapist
- Richard Riehle as Tom Smykowski, a cynical Initech product manager
- Alexandra Wentworth as Anne, Peter's girlfriend who cheats on him
- Greg Pitts as Drew, a young Initech employee
- Paul Willson as Bob Porter, Bob Slydell's colleague
- Todd Duffey as Brian, Chotchkie's Waiter; a cheerful young man who works at Chotchkie's with Joanna
- Orlando Jones as Steve, a magazine salesman and former employee at Initrode
- Mike Judge as Stan, the manager of the Chotchkie's restaurant
- Joe Bays as Dom Portwood, one of Peter's superiors at Initech
- Kinna McInroe as Nina.

== Production ==
=== Development ===
Office Space originated in the series of three animated Milton short films that Judge created about an office worker by that name. They first aired on Liquid Television and on Saturday Night Live. The inspiration came from a temp job which he had that involved alphabetizing purchase orders and another job as an engineer for Parallax Graphics for three months in the San Francisco Bay Area during the 1980s, "just in the heart of Silicon Valley and in the middle of that overachiever yuppie thing, it was just awful."

Peter Chernin, head of 20th Century Fox, where Judge had a deal, wanted to make a film out of the Milton character, inspired by a former coworker of Judge's in Silicon Valley who had threatened to quit if the company moved his desk again. "You don't want to know what he does at home after work", Judge replied. Instead he suggested an ensemble cast–based film; someone at the studio responded with Car Wash but "just set in an office."

Milton was not the only character inspired by someone from Judge's past. During his jobs in Silicon Valley, where he barely made enough to afford his rent, he had a neighbor who was an auto mechanic. Not only did the man make more money, he had flexible work hours and seemed to Judge to be much more content with his life and work than he himself was. The neighbor inspired Lawrence, Peter's neighbor in the film.

The setting of the film reflects a prevailing trend that Judge observed in the United States. "It seems like every city now has these identical office parks with identical adjoining chain restaurants", he said in an interview. "There were a lot of people who wanted me to set this movie in Wall Street, or like the movie Brazil, but I wanted it very unglamorous, the kind of bleak work situation like I was in".

Judge wrote a treatment in 1996, and the script after the first season of King of the Hill. Fox president Tom Rothman was happy with the draft as he was looking for lighter material to balance the event movies like Titanic that dominated the studio's output at the time. He considered it "the most brilliant workplace satire I'd ever read". Despite that, Judge hated the ending and wished he could have completely rewritten the third act.

=== Casting ===
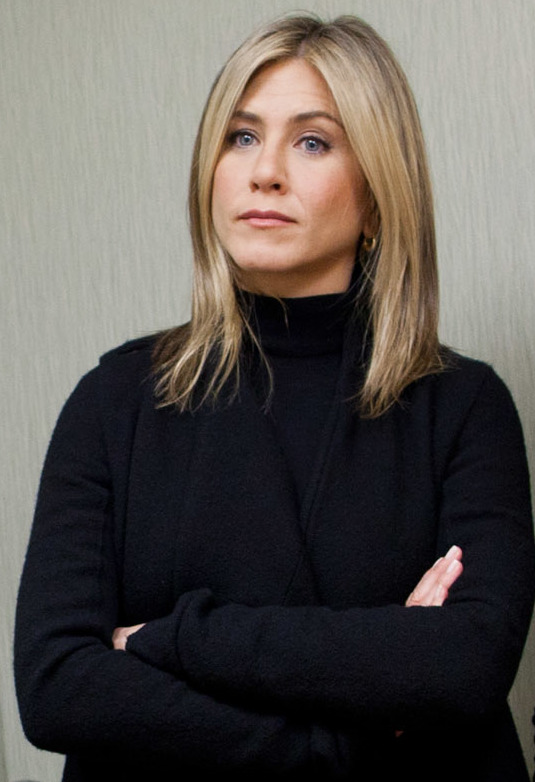
Jennifer Aniston (pictured in 2011) was cast in Office Space to feature a recognizable star.

David Herman was the only actor Judge had in mind for a specific part: Michael Bolton. Herman had been trying to leave his seven-year contract at MADtv, but the show would not let him. So, at its next table reading, he managed to get himself fired by screaming all his lines. Greg Daniels said they could always find a place for him on King of the Hill, where he had been doing some voice work; soon after he read Judge's Office Space script and was delighted with it.

At the first read-through of the script, Judge was pleased with Herman's performance, and felt Stephen Root improved on his own take on Milton, but was not happy with the rest of the cast. He considered abandoning the film, but Rothman said it worked and just needed the right actors. According to Judge, while Fox at first told him to just get the best actors possible since the film's budget would not be large enough to consider bankable stars, the studio soon changed its mind.

In the wake of the success of Good Will Hunting, he was advised to get that film's stars, Ben Affleck and Matt Damon. Again, he almost changed his mind about the film (Rothman said in 2019 that while A-list stars are often unlikely to take roles in low-budget productions, those films should nevertheless make the effort to attract them). He had agreed to meet with Damon in New York, but then Ron Livingston's agent asked if his client could audition for the lead. Casting director Nancy Klopper was impressed, and after Judge saw the video he told the studio that he wanted Livingston in the part.

Jennifer Aniston was cast to accommodate Fox's desire to have a recognizable star in the film, although they were concerned that her part was so small; the subplot involving her battle with her boss over her "flair" was added as a result and she was written out of the sex-dream sequence, along with dialogue indicating she actually had slept with Lumbergh. However, she had liked the script since she was not getting many other films like that at that point, and she had gone to the same high school as Herman, Fiorello H. LaGuardia High School in New York. Kate Hudson also read for the part.

After casting the Indian American Ajay Naidu as Samir, who had originally been written as Iranian, the character was rewritten to be Jordanian, and Naidu worked with a dialect coach to get the accent right. John C. McGinley auditioned for Lumbergh, but was ultimately cast as Slydell. Judge says that after Gary Cole read for Lumbergh, there was no doubt as to who would play him. "He made the character 10 times funnier." A casting search in Texas yielded Greg Pitts for Drew, but no one who could play the Chotchkie's manager, so Judge took that role himself.

=== Principal photography ===
Judge made the transition from animation to live-action with the help of Tim Suhrstedt, the film's director of photography, who taught him about lenses and where to put the camera. Judge says, "I had a great crew, and it's good going into it not pretending you're an expert". Principal photography began in Texas in May 1998.

Several issues arose during filming. By the third day of shooting, temperatures had risen to over 100 °F (38 °C), and smoke from fires in Mexico was filling the sky over Austin, making it white. Suhrstedt says that forced the postponement of the opening traffic-jam scene until it cleared.

Studio executives who saw the dailies were not happy with the footage that Judge was getting. Judge quoted studio executives as stating, "More energy! More energy! We gotta reshoot it! You're failing! You're failing!" They also asked for Livingston to smile more. But at that point, only the early scenes had been filmed; Judge told the studio that happier scenes would come later. Livingston says he heard they believed he was on drugs and were considering firing him.

In addition, Fox did not like the gangsta rap music used in the film. Rothman told him he had to take it out, and Judge said after production he would do so if the next focus group also disliked it. A young man in that focus group said the fact that the characters worked in an office but listened to gangsta rap was one of the things he liked about the movie, and Rothman relented.

The scene where Peter, Michael and Samir take their office printer out into a field and batter it to pieces was inspired by Judge's experience with his own printer while writing Beavis and Butt-Head Do America. He told his cowriter Joe Stillman that he was so frustrated by it that when he was done with the script, he planned to take it out into a field and destroy it while videotaping the process. Suhrstedt says the whole sequence was largely improvised, but Naidu adds that they were trying to do it in a way that evoked how the Mafia would do it to someone it wanted to punish or kill; Livingston thus played his part like the "don", circling behind Naidu and Herman while they struck the blows with bat, feet and fists. Years afterward, Naidu says, he met some actual mafiosi in New York who told him that they were huge fans of the film, and the scene was "authentic".

McGinley says the film contains many improvised moments. "It was like jazz on that set". One example he recalled was when Paul Willson as Bob Porter cannot pronounce Samir's last name: "Naga ... Naga ... well, not gonna work here anymore anyway." Naidu, for his part, improvised the break dancing, which he did with local friends after shooting his scenes during the day.

The improvisation also helped solve some problems with the script. Originally Bolton was to refer to the singer he shared his name with as a "no-singing asshole". However, Herman recalled, it was decided that the film could not say that since it would imply he did not sing his own songs, so he came up with "no-talent ass-clown".

The Alligator Grill, on South Lamar Blvd, Austin, was used for the interior shots of Chotchkies, Joanna's workplace.

=== Production design ===
Judge was very exacting in his demands for how the Initech set looked; he said regularly that it had to seem "oppressive". The production went as far as screen-testing different types of gray cubicles; Judge also wanted the cubicles to be tall so that Lumbergh would have to lean in to be seen from Peter's desk. Considerable effort was also expended to making sure the TPS reports looked realistic.

The glasses Root wore to play Milton had lenses so thick that he had to wear contact lenses to see through them. Even so, he still had no depth perception; he had to practice reaching for the stapler and was as a result grateful it had been painted red. Swingline provided the stapler after the filmmakers could not get permission to use either the Boston or Bostitch brands from their manufacturer.

== Release ==
=== Marketing ===
Judge hated the onesheet poster that the studio created for Office Space, which depicted an office worker completely covered in Post-it notes. He said, "People were like, 'What is this? A big bird? A mummy? A beekeeper?' And the tagline 'Work Sucks'? It looked like an Office Depot ad. I just hated it. I hated the trailers, too and the TV ads especially". McGinley, too, felt it looked like Big Bird from the children's series Sesame Street, and that he would not go to see such a film. For the home release Judge was upset that the same image was used, albeit with Milton peeking over the man from behind.

The studio also had a man live in a Plexiglas cube above Times Square for five days, who was broadcast live on the Internet as he answered calls and emails from people dissatisfied with their jobs. Livingston, when he visited the cube for press events, found that most reporters preferred to talk to the man in the cube and not him. He was not surprised, as tracking for the movie was not good and "there was a foregone conclusion that it wasn't going to open well." Producer Michael Rotenberg elaborated that "[i]t took a few research screenings to realize that audiences often have issues with satire."

Another problem that Rothman later conceded was that they could not put Aniston on the poster due to her small role. Later he admitted that the marketing campaign did not work and said, "Office Space isn't like American Pie. It doesn't have the kind of jokes you put in a 15-second television spot of somebody getting hit on the head with a frying pan. It's sly. And let me tell you, sly is hard to sell".

=== Box office ===
Office Space was released on February 19, 1999, at the end of the release calendar's "dump months", in 1,740 theaters, grossing $4.2 million on its opening weekend. That was eighth overall and second for new releases after October Sky. Herman said he was elated after seeing the film in Los Angeles and hearing it had made $7 million, until friends more familiar with the movie business told him that was considered a poor performance.

Suhrstedt saw it later in Burbank, and the theater was almost full. He assured Judge that word of mouth would slowly increase the audience. However, in early March, Fox pulled it from three-quarters of the screens it had been on after it barely made a million dollars that weekend. The movie's grosses continued to decline precipitously, and after the end of March, when it pulled in less than $40,000 from 75 screens, it was pulled from release altogether. According to Judge, a studio executive blamed the movie exclusively for the failure, telling him "Nobody wants to see your little movie about ordinary people and their boring little lives."

It went on to make $10.8 million in North America. The international release brought an additional $2 million. On home release, $8 million in DVD, Blu-ray Disc and VHS sales were sold at release as of April 2006.

== Reception ==
=== Critical reception ===
On the review aggregator website Rotten Tomatoes, the film has an approval rating of 82% based on 103 reviews and an average rating of 6.8/10. The site's critical consensus reads, "Mike Judge lampoons the office grind with its inspired mix of sharp dialogue and witty one-liners." Metacritic gives the film a weighted average score of 68 out of 100 based on reviews from 31 critics. Audiences polled by CinemaScore during opening weekend gave the film an average grade of "C+" on a scale ranging from A+ to F.

Roger Ebert of the Chicago Sun-Times gave the film three out of four, and wrote that Judge "treats his characters a little like cartoon creatures. That works. Nuances of behavior are not necessary, because in the cubicle world every personality trait is magnified, and the captives stagger forth like grotesques." In his review for the San Francisco Chronicle, Mick LaSalle writes, "Livingston is nicely cast as Peter, a young guy whose imagination and capacity for happiness are the very things making him miserable." In USA Today, Susan Wloszczyna wrote, "If you've ever had a job, you'll be amused by this paean to peons."

Owen Gleiberman in Entertainment Weekly gave the film a "C" rating and criticized it for feeling "cramped and underimagined". In his review for The Globe and Mail, Rick Groen wrote: "Perhaps his TV background makes him unaccustomed to the demands of a feature-length script (the ending seems almost panicky in its abruptness), or maybe he just succumbs to the lure of the easy yuk...what began as discomfiting satire soon devolves into silly farce." In his review in The New York Times, Stephen Holden wrote, "It has the loose-jointed feel of a bunch of sketches packed together into a narrative that doesn't gather much momentum."

In 2008, Entertainment Weekly named Office Space one of "The 100 best films from 1983 to 2008", ranking it at #73.

=== Cult status ===
Disappointed in the film's $12 million domestic gross, Judge decided to move on and began work on what eventually became Extract, a similarly themed followup to Office Space. Fox suggested that next time, he pay more heed to the studio's casting suggestions. However, he soon learned that the film had not gone unnoticed within the industry. "Jim Carrey invited me to his house. Chris Rock left me the best voicemail ever. I had dinner with Madonna", who found the Michael Bolton character's anger "sexy", Judge said.

Four years later, Judge was working on the Idiocracy screenplay with Etan Cohen. During a break, the two went to an Austin Starbucks, and the baristas were doing impressions of Lumbergh. Cohen asked Judge if they were only doing it because he was present, whereupon the barista turned around and asked the two if they had ever seen the movie.

Other cast members found the film had reached people when strangers began associating them with their characters. Cole, who had previously worked service jobs including bartending, said that he had not realized "the scope of the office audience" until a year after release, when people began shouting dialogue from the movie at him. Aniston says that even today, when she is eating "at a certain type of restaurant", people will ask if she likes their flair.

The cable channel Comedy Central premiered Office Space on August 5, 2001; that airing drew 1.4 million viewers. By 2003, the channel had broadcast the film another 35 times. These broadcasts helped develop the film's cult following; Livingston credits the regular airings the film received on Comedy Central for making Office Space a cult favorite: "It felt like it kind of went viral before that concept even existed."

Since then, Livingston has been approached by college students and office workers. He said, "I get a lot of people who say, 'I quit my job because of you.' That's kind of a heavy load to carry." Livingston says that people tell him watching Office Space made them feel better, which he still appreciates.

== Legacy ==
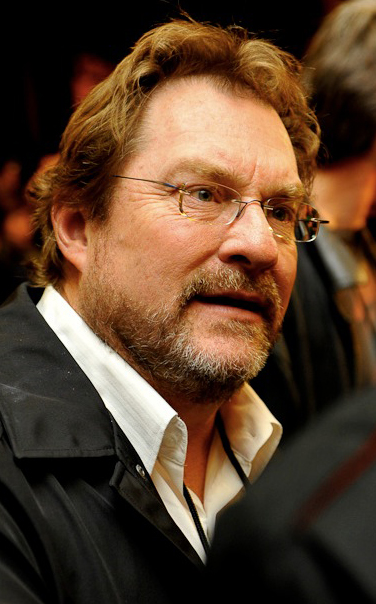
Root at a 10th anniversary event

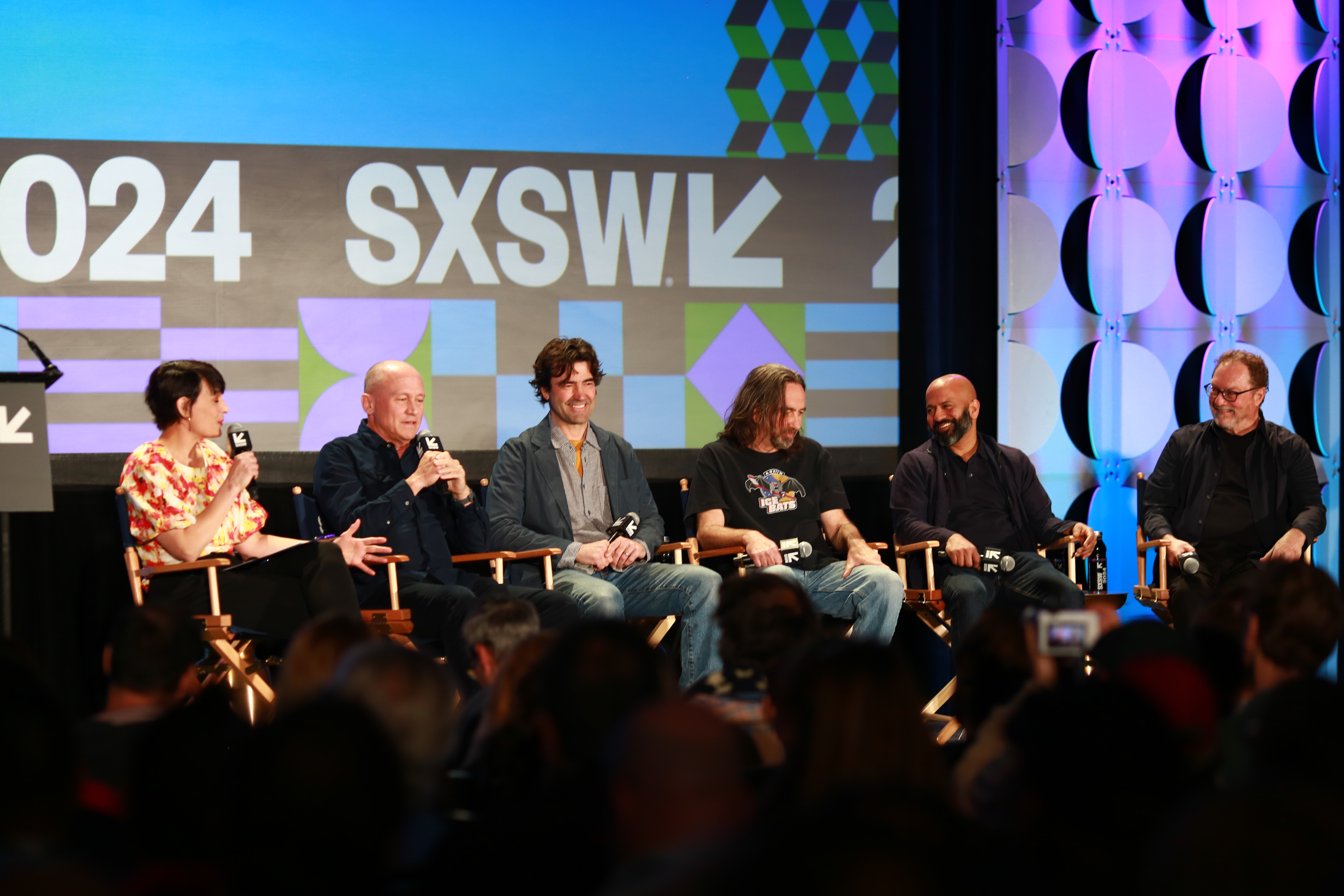
Cast at a 25th anniversary reunion panel at South by Southwest 2024

Office Space has become a cult classic, selling well on home video and DVD. As of 2003, it had sold 2.6 million copies on VHS and DVD. In the same year, it was in the top 20 best-selling Fox DVDs. As of 2006, it had sold over six million DVDs in the United States alone.

Four years after the film's release, Judge recalled that one of his assistant directors on the film told him they had gone out to eat at a TGI Fridays and noticed that the waitstaff were no longer wearing buttons on their uniforms, the "flair" Joanna quits her job over in the film. Asked why, the manager told him that after Office Space had come out, customers started making jokes about it, so the chain dropped the requirement from its dress code. "So, maybe I made the world a better place" he told Deadline Hollywood in 2014.

In 2008, Entertainment Weekly ranked it fifth on its list "25 Great Comedies From the Past 25 Years", despite having originally given the film a poor review. In February 2009, a reunion of many of the cast members took place at the Paramount Theatre in Austin to celebrate the tenth anniversary of the film. Rothman said in 2019 that despite his connection to several films that won the Academy Award for Best Picture, he hopes Office Space will be mentioned before them in his obituary.

"[Office Space] spoke to a generation in a way that few movies have," said John Altschuler, who produced Extract, Judge's later companion piece. "Nobody does this kind of material. It's all about the weirdness of real people in real life."

In a 2017 profile of Judge, New York Times Magazine writer Willy Staley observed that the film has been compared to Herman Melville's short story "Bartleby, the Scrivener", in which a lawyer's clerk, like Peter, shows up at the office one day but declines all work, telling his boss "I would prefer not to". Staley's own high school English teacher, he recalled, brought up Office Space in class to get students to appreciate how tedious Franz Kafka's work at an insurance company was. "It's such a brutal portrayal of workplace misery that its most useful points of comparison date back to when office culture was first unleashed on humanity."

The film was an influence on the creation of the television series Severance, and the comic book series Chew, with the film's main characters cameoing in its third installment, Just Desserts.

In 2022 software engineer Ermenildo Valdez Castro was inspired by the movie Office Space, conducting a similar scheme from the movie by editing code to divert shipping fees to a personal account. A report from the Seattle police mentions that a folder named "OfficeSpace project" was found on Castro's work laptop and Castro admitted he was indeed inspired by the movie. Castro stole over $300,000 from the company Zulily.

In 2024 at the South by Southwest conference, there was an Office Space Reunion panel with Judge, Livingston, Root, Naidu and Herman.

=== In culture ===
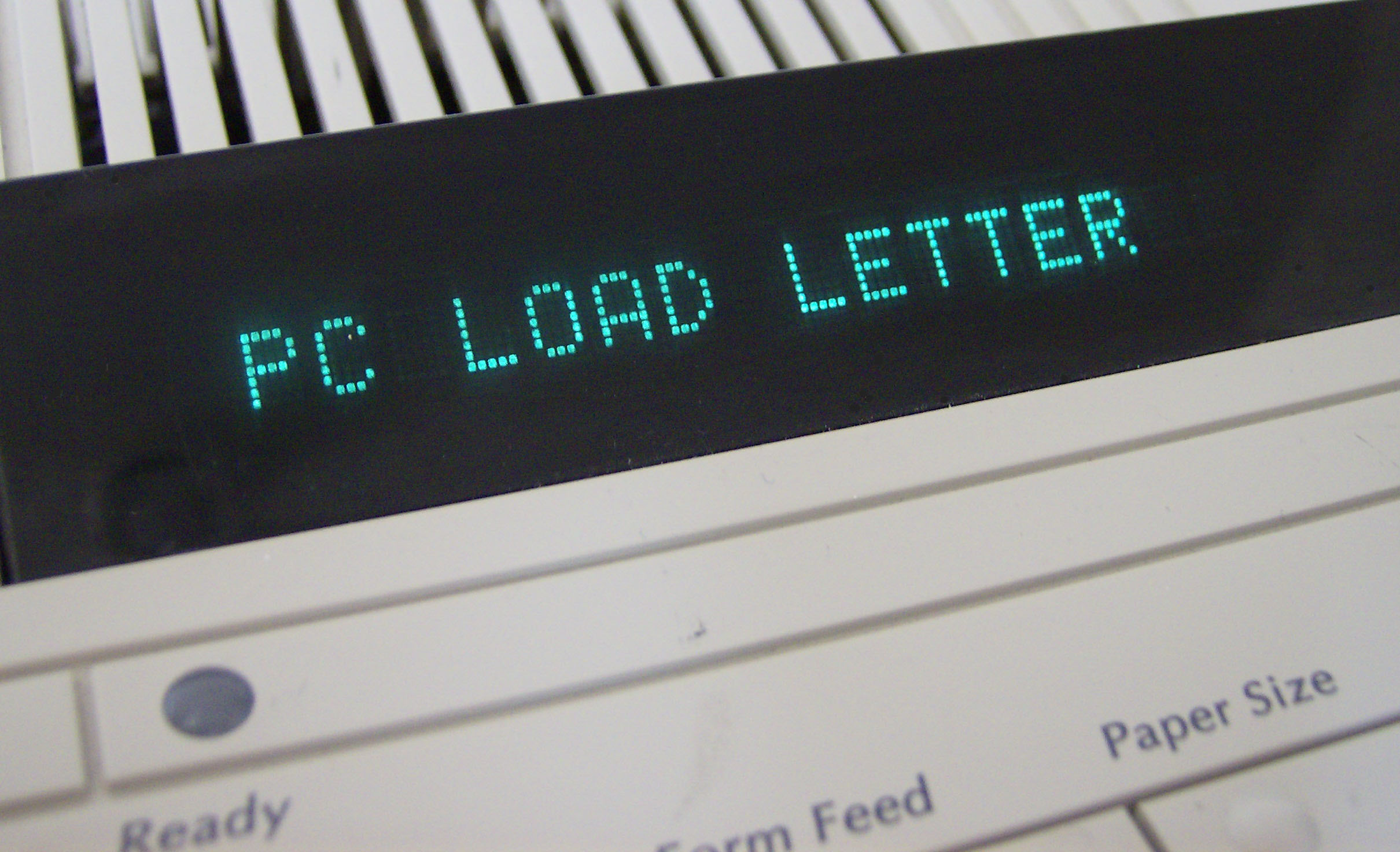
An actual PC LOAD LETTER error message

Several elements of the film have become memes reused in other contexts. "TPS report" has come to connote pointless, mindless paperwork, and an example of "literacy practices" in the work environment that are "meaningless exercises imposed upon employees by an inept and uncaring management" and "relentlessly mundane and enervating". According to Judge, the abbreviation stood for "Test Program Set" in the movie. The PC LOAD LETTER error message has likewise become a stand-in for any confusing, vague message from a computer, especially printers. The printer scene has been widely parodied, including by one U.S. presidential campaign, and the popularity of Milton's red stapler led the manufacturer to make a real one for sale.

External videos
- "Office Space with Michael Bolton"

The film is credited with coining the now-popular slang term "ass clown", from one of the characters using it to refer to singer Michael Bolton. In 2015, the comedy website Funny or Die put together several videos in which it spliced in the actual Michael Bolton over Herman in scenes from the film. Most of them were ones that referenced the confusion coming from the character and the singer having the same name. Bolton performed the scenes exactly as Herman had, with one exception: in his conversation with Samir, he turned to the camera and substituted the words "extremely talented" for "no-talent" before "ass-clown".

==== Printer scene ====
Before the 2009 Austin reunion screening a printer was destroyed outside the theater, in reference to the scene in the film during which Peter, Michael, and Samir destroy the dysfunctional printer on the latter two's final day at Initech That scene has frequently been parodied, often by amateurs, using a similar electronic device, in an open space somewhere, emulating the original's character blocking, camera angles and moves, sound effects and use of slow motion, all set to Geto Boys' "Still".

The Fox animated series Family Guy did its own parody of the scene in 2008, during the show's seventh season. In "I Dream of Jesus", the season's second episode, Brian and Stewie Griffin (both voiced by Seth MacFarlane), tired of Peter Griffin constantly playing The Trashmen's "Surfin' Bird", steal his 45 rpm single of the song and demolish it in a similar scene. For television, a clean version of "Still" had to be used.

During the campaign for the Republican nomination in the 2016 presidential election, Texas senator Ted Cruz ran a political advertisement parodying the scene, showing an impersonator of likely Democratic nominee Hillary Clinton and two assistants destroying her personal email server with a baseball bat in an open field.

==== Red stapler ====
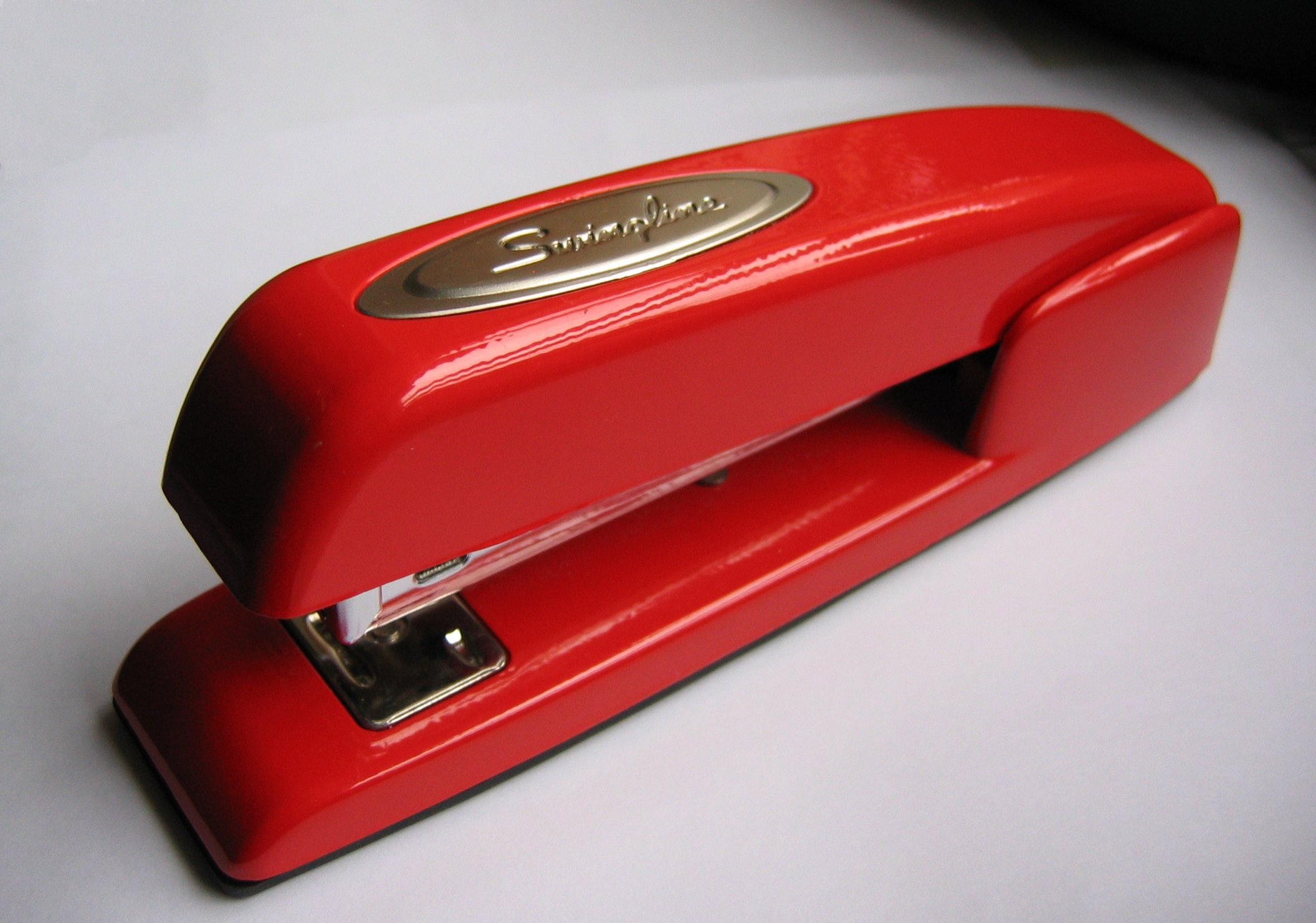
Swingline made a red stapler in response to demand created by the film.

Stephen Root says he realized the movie's impact when people started asking him to sign their staplers. The red Swingline stapler featured prominently in the film was not available until April 2002 when the company released it in response to repeated requests by fans of the film. Its appearance in the film was achieved by taking a standard Swingline stapler and spray-painting it red. Root says when he shows up on sets today, the crew has usually ordered several boxes of red Swingline staplers and left them waiting for him.

== In other media ==
=== Musical ===
The film has been adapted to a musical several times.

=== Video game ===
Kongregate released a mobile game based on the film, titled Office Space: Idle Profits, on iOS and Android in 2017. It was a free-to-play idle clicker that offered in-app purchases. In 2022 it was shut down.

=== Soundtrack ===
Office Space: Motion Picture Soundtrack

Soundtrack album by Various artists
- Released: February 18, 1999
- Genre: Hip-hop
- Length: 44:35
- Label: Interscope
- Producers: Karyn Rachtman (exec.); Mike Judge (exec.); N.O. Joe; Jay Dee; John Bido; John Forté; Junior Reid; Kool Keith; KutMasta Kurt; Madness 4 Real; Nature's Fynest; Quincy Jones III; Salaam Remi; Scarface

Professional ratings
Review scores
Source	Rating
AllMusic	4.5/5 stars

Track listing

No.	Title	Writer(s)	Performer(s)	Length
1.	"Shove This Jay-Oh-Bee" (contains portions of "Take This Job and Shove It" by Johnny Paycheck, 1977)	Germaine Williams; Salaam Remi; David Allan Coe	Canibus with Biz Markie	4:21
2.	"Get Dis Money"	R.L. Altman III; Titus Glover; James Yancey	Slum Village	3:36
3.	"Get Off My Elevator"	Keith Thornton; Kurt Matlin	Kool Keith	3:46
4.	"Big Boss Man" (cover of Jimmy Reed, 1960)	Luther Dixon; Al Smith	Junior Reid	3:46
5.	"9-5" (cover of Dolly Parton, 1980)	Dolly Parton	Lisa Stone	3:40
6.	"Down for Whatever" (from Lethal Injection, 1993)	O'Shea Jackson Sr.; Jesper Dahl; Lasse Bavngaard; Nicholas Kvaran; Rasmus Berg	Ice Cube	4:40
7.	"Damn It Feels Good to Be a Gangsta" (from Uncut Dope: Geto Boys' Best, 1992)	Brad Jordan; John Okuribido; James Prince	Geto Boys	5:09
8.	"Home"	Benny Wise; C. Hernandez; N. Vasquez; John Forté	Blackman, Destruct & Icon	4:22
9.	"No Tears" (from The Diary, 1994)	Brad Jordan; Joseph Johnson	Scarface	2:27
10.	"Still" (from The Resurrection, 1996)	William Dennis; Brad Jordan; Joseph Johnson	Geto Boys	4:03
11.	"Mambo #8" (from Pérez Prado Plays Mucho Mambo For Dancing, 1952)	Pérez Prado	Pérez Prado	2:06
12.	"Peanut Vendor" (from Havana, 3 A.M., 1956)	Moises Simons	Pérez Prado	2:39
Total length:				44:35

== Possible sequels ==
Shortly after the release of Office Space, Judge, despite his disappointment at the movie's lackluster box office, began writing the script for Extract, which he describes as a companion piece. The studio later asked him to put it aside to work on Idiocracy, which it believed would be more commercial. After that film, like Office Space, failed at the box office but became a cult favorite, Judge returned to Extract and it was released in 2009. It similarly makes light of workplace dysfunction, but from the perspective of a manager rather than a worker.

"There's been talk of doing more with Office Space, as a show or sequel, but it's never seemed right," Judge said ahead of the film's 20th anniversary. As for the former possibility, he recalled that because of the film, NBC offered him the chance to shape the American version of the British sitcom The Office, which similarly bases its humor in depictions of the absurdity of white-collar work and its effect on those who do it. Among the material the network sent, however, were some reviews, one of which said the series "succeeds where movies like Office Space failed." Judge passed on the offer.

== See also ==
- 1999 in film
- List of American films of 1999
- List of comedy films of the 1990s
- List of cult films
- List of Jennifer Aniston performances
- Mike Judge filmography
- Clockwatchers, 1997 comedy-drama about four female office temps with similar themes
- Dilbert, comic strip with similar characters, setting and themes
- Silicon Valley, comedy series created by Judge set at tech companies
- Bartleby, the Scrivener, short story by Herman Melville with similar themes
- Bullshit jobs, a concept developed by David Graeber which describes meaningless office work
- Slacker

== Bibliography ==
- Hunt, Stacey Wilson (January 11, 2019). "The oral history of 'Office Space': Behind the scenes of the cult classic". Entertainment Weekly. Archived from the original on January 11, 2019.
- Kring-Schreifels, Jake (February 19, 2019). "Follow the Path of Least Resistance: An Oral History of 'Office Space'". The Ringer. Archived from the original on February 19, 2019.
