= Extract (film) =

- Theatrical release poster
- Directed by: Mike Judge
- Written by: Mike Judge
- Produced by: John Altschuler; Michael Rotenberg
- Starring: Jason Bateman; Mila Kunis; Kristen Wiig; J. K. Simmons; David Koechner; Clifton Collins Jr.; Ben Affleck
- Cinematography: Tim Suhrstedt
- Edited by: Julia Wong
- Music by: George S. Clinton
- Production companies: Judgmental Films; 3 Arts Entertainment; Miramax Films; Ternion Entertainment
- Distributed by: Miramax Films (United States); ContentFilm International (Overseas)
- Release date: September 4, 2009
- Running time: 92 minutes
- Country: United States
- Language: English
- Budget: $8 million
- Box office: $10.8 million

Extract is a 2009 American comedy film written and directed by Mike Judge, about the owner of a small flavor extract company balancing problems at work and in his home life. The film stars an ensemble cast featuring Jason Bateman, Mila Kunis, Kristen Wiig, and Ben Affleck, with J. K. Simmons, Clifton Collins Jr., and Dustin Milligan.

Judge described Extract as his companion piece to Office Space (1999), being focused on the boss's perspective rather than the workers'. The director relied on his own knowledge of the industrial world having actually worked in a factory, and much of the film was shot in a working water bottling plant in City of Commerce, California.

Extract was theatrically released in the United States on September 4, 2009. It received generally positive reviews from critics and grossed $10.8 million worldwide against a budget of $8 million.

== Plot ==
Joel Reynolds is the owner and founder of Reynolds Extract, a flavoring extracts company. Although his business is successful, his marriage to Suzie lacks passion. He is also often accosted by his annoying neighbor, Nathan. One day, a series of mishaps at the factory lead to employee Step losing a testicle. Cindy, a con artist, reads a news story about the accident. Hatching a get-rich-quick scheme, she gets a temporary job at the factory, manipulating Joel into giving her more information about Step. She also begins to commit petty thefts from her co-workers, who openly accuse each other of the thefts. Although Step initially decides not to sue the company, he changes his mind after a meeting with Cindy, which she sets up in order to meet and flirt with him. Under Cindy's influence, Step hires attorney Joe Adler.

Joel believes Cindy's manipulations are genuine attraction to him, and entertains the idea of an affair with her; however, he still loves his wife and wants to avoid actions that would leave him with regrets later. While visiting his friend Dean and complaining about his situation, Dean suggests that Joel hire a gigolo to seduce Suzie, so Joel can then have a guilt-free "revenge" affair. Joel initially balks at the idea, but he agrees after his judgment is impaired due to ingesting a ketamine tablet that Dean mistakenly told him was Xanax. The friends hire Brad to seduce Joel's wife into an affair, while Brad is posing as the pool cleaner. The next morning, Joel sobers up, realizes what he has done, and tries to stop Brad from going to his house; by then, Brad and Suzie have already begun an affair. Brad falls in love with Suzie and wants to run away with her. After smoking marijuana with Dean and his friend Willie, Joel attempts to call Cindy but soon realizes that he is calling Willie's number. Just then, Cindy walks into the apartment. Willie discovers Joel's intentions and punches Joel in the face.

Joel meets with Adler and his associates to discuss the terms of the settlement for Step. The workers, believing that the meeting is about a buy-out of the factory by General Mills, organize a strike. Frustrated by Adler's uncompromising negotiating style and the growing disrespect from his employees, Joel storms out and goes home—where Suzie admits her affair with Brad. Joel admits to Suzie that he hired Brad and Joel and Suzie argue.

Joel moves into a motel, where he spots Cindy, staying in another room. When he goes to her room, he notices a purse stolen from one of his employees, along with other stolen items, and realizes that Cindy is not only a thief, but is also behind many of the company's problems. Joel threatens to call the police but softens when Cindy breaks down in tears. Cindy promises to talk to Step and get him to drop the lawsuit. Ultimately, the two spend the night together. The next morning, Cindy disappears but leaves the stolen items behind.

Step meets with Joel at the factory and offers to drop the lawsuit if Joel promotes him to floor manager. Meanwhile, Nathan stops by Joel's house again, making Suzie lose her temper and finally tell him what she really thinks of him. Just as she finishes her tirade, he collapses and dies; feeling guilty, Suzie attends the funeral, where she runs into Joel. After an awkward moment, the two agree to share a ride. It is revealed that Cindy has stolen Adler's luxury car, leaving Step's truck in its place.

== Cast ==
- Jason Bateman as Joel Reynolds
- Ben Affleck as Dean Slade
- Kristen Wiig as Suzie Reynolds
- Mila Kunis as Cindy
- J. K. Simmons as Brian Huggins
- Clifton Collins Jr. as Don "Step" Wilkinson
- Dustin Milligan as Brad Chávez
- David Koechner as Nathan
- Beth Grant as Mary
- T. J. Miller as Rory
- Matt Schulze as Willie
- Gene Simmons as Joe Adler
- Brent Briscoe as Phil
- Hal Sparks as Guitar salesman #1
- Nick Thune as Guitar salesman #2
- Tom Virtue as Guitar customer
- Jenny O'Hara as Joel's secretary
- Mike Judge as Jim the factory employee
- Lidia Porto as Gabriella
- Javier Gutierrez as Hector
- Lamberto Gutierrez as Victor

== Production ==
Principal photography began on August 25, 2008, in Los Angeles. Shortly after completing Office Space (1999), director Mike Judge was already about 40 pages into his follow-up script, set in the world of an extract factory when he was convinced by his representative team that he needed to shelve that and concentrate on something more commercial. "The only idea that I had that anyone was interested in was what eventually became Idiocracy," says Judge. Over the next several years he focused his energy on developing Idiocracy. But years later, by the time of the film's release, audiences had decided that Office Space had struck a chord, and they were ready to see Judge return to on-the-job humor and thus the Extract script was given new life.

Seeking to keep Extract below the radar of the studio system, Judge and his producers set up a production company, Ternion Productions, and arranged private financing—while partnering with Miramax for domestic distribution of the film. Judge relied heavily on his own personal knowledge of the industrial world to bring the story to life. "I actually worked in a factory a little bit myself," the director stated. "I hopefully write stuff that is recognizable as the archetypes of this world." Keeping true to this baseline of reality, Extract was shot in a working factory, in this case, a water bottling plant south of Los Angeles, in the City of Commerce. Judge took the authenticity one step further by using the plant's employees as extras in the scenes' backgrounds. "Those people were actually running, doing some bottling while we were shooting. There were people working on machines that were so loud in there that they couldn't hear anyone call 'action' or 'cut.' They were just doing their job." Shooting on the factory set led Judge to some epiphanies about what made the story resonate for him: "Office Space was told from the point of view of the employees looking up at management as the 'bad guys'. This is told from the point of view of the owner of the place and the workers are a big pain in the butt to him. I think partly it was inspired by that point in my life where I suddenly had a large number of people working for me and realizing you can't be a 'cool guy boss'. It just doesn't work. So this is my more sympathetic take on the boss."

== Release ==
Extract was released on September 4, 2009, in the United States.

=== Marketing ===
Leading up to the film's release, Affleck went on a promotional tour of various cities, starting in Vancouver, Washington, on August 20, 2009, and ending in Los Angeles on September 14, 2009.

In an effort to promote the film, Judge released a promotional short which featured his characters Beavis and Butt-head who summarize, and critique, the events depicted in the film.

=== Home media ===
Extract was released on DVD and Blu-ray Disc on December 22, 2009.

== Reception ==
=== Box office ===
Extract made $4.3 million during its opening weekend and $7.1 million in its first week of release, with a total worldwide gross of $10.8 million, against a production budget of $8 million.

=== Critical response ===
On review aggregation website Rotten Tomatoes, the film has an approval rating of 62% based on 189 reviews, with an average rating of 5.90/10. The site's critical consensus reads, "Extract has some very funny moments and several fine performances, but the film feels slighter and more uneven than Mike Judge's previous work." On Metacritic, the film has a weighted average score of 61 out of 100, based on 33 critics, indicating "generally favorable" reviews.

Dan Zak of The Washington Post, called the film "the most disappointing American comedy of the decade". On the other end of the spectrum, Michael Phillips of the Chicago Tribune called Extract "the funniest American comedy of the summer". Roger Ebert of The Chicago Sun Times gave Extract a mixed 2.5 stars out of a possible 4, saying the film had some good moments (especially scenes with Bateman, Kunis and Koecher), but as a whole "lacks the focus and comic energy" found in Office Space.
