= Mike Judge =

American actor, animator, and filmmaker (born 1962)

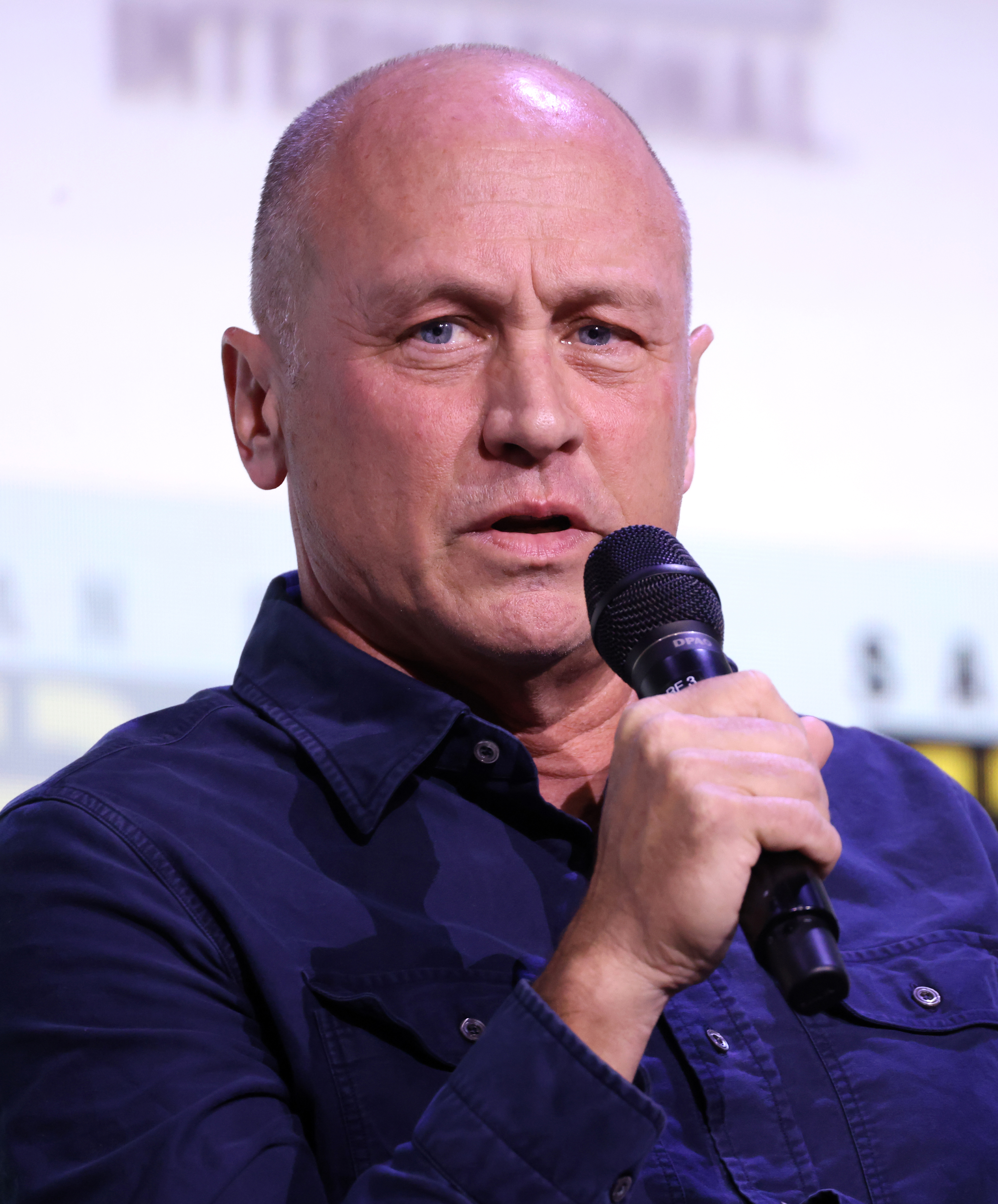
- Judge in 2025
- Born: Michael Craig Judge; October 17, 1962 (age 64); Guayaquil, Ecuador
- Education: University of California, San Diego (BS)
- Occupations: Actor; animator; writer; producer; director
- Years active: 1990–present
- Works: Roles and awards
- Spouse: Francesca Morocco (m. 1989; div. 2009)
- Children: 2

Michael Craig Judge (born October 17, 1962) is an American actor, animator, writer, producer, and director. He is the creator of the animated television series Beavis and Butt-Head (1993–1997, 2011, 2022–present), and co-created the television series King of the Hill (1997–2010, 2025–present), The Goode Family (2009), Silicon Valley (2014–2019), and Mike Judge Presents: Tales from the Tour Bus (2017–2018). He wrote and directed the films Beavis and Butt-Head Do America (1996), Office Space (1999), Idiocracy (2006), and Extract (2009), and co-wrote the screenplay to Beavis and Butt-Head Do the Universe (2022). He also voice acted Kenny McCormick in South Park: Bigger, Longer & Uncut (1999).

Judge was born in Guayaquil, Ecuador, and raised in Albuquerque, New Mexico. He graduated from the University of California, San Diego, where he studied physics. After losing interest in a science career, Judge focused on animation and short films. His animated short Frog Baseball was developed into the successful MTV series Beavis and Butt-Head, and the spin-off series Daria (with which Judge had no involvement).

In 1995, Judge and Greg Daniels developed King of the Hill, which debuted on Fox in 1997 and quickly became popular with both critics and audiences. Running for 13 seasons, it became one of the longest-running American animated series. During the run of the show, Judge took time off to write and direct Office Space, Idiocracy and Extract. As King of the Hill was coming to an end, Judge created his third show, ABC's The Goode Family, which received mixed reviews and was canceled after 13 episodes. After a four-year hiatus, he created his fourth show, the live-action Silicon Valley for HBO, which has received critical acclaim. In 2017, Judge's fourth animated series, the music-themed Tales from the Tour Bus, premiered on Cinemax, to acclaim.

Judge has won a Primetime Emmy Award and two Annie Awards for King of the Hill and two Critics' Choice Television Awards and Satellite Awards for Silicon Valley.

== Early life ==
Michael Craig Judge was born on October 17, 1962, in Guayaquil, Ecuador. He is the middle of three children born to Margaret Yvonne (née Blue), a librarian, and William James Judge, an archaeologist. At the time of his birth, his father was working for a nonprofit organization in Guayaquil and other parts of Ecuador, promoting agricultural development. Judge was raised from age three in Albuquerque, New Mexico, where he briefly lived on a chicken farm. He attended St. Pius X High School and graduated with a Bachelor of Science in physics from the University of California, San Diego, (UCSD) in 1985.

== Career ==
=== 1985–1997: Early science career; musician; animation and Beavis and Butt-Head ===
After graduating from UCSD in 1985, he successfully held several brief jobs in physics and mechanical engineering, but found himself growing bored with science. In 1987, he moved to Silicon Valley to join Parallax Graphics, a startup video card company with about 40 employees based in Santa Clara, California. Disliking the company's culture and his colleagues, Judge quit after less than three months, describing it as, "The people I met were like Stepford Wives. They were true believers in something, and I don't know what it was". Shortly after quitting his job, he became a bass player with a touring blues band. He was a part of Anson Funderburgh's band for two years, playing on their 1990 Black Top Records release Rack 'Em Up, while taking graduate math classes at the University of Texas at Dallas. He was planning to earn a master's degree as "a back-up plan" to become a community college math teacher after relocating to the north Dallas area for his then-wife's new job. In 1989, after seeing animation cels on display in a movie theater, Judge purchased a Bolex 16 mm film camera and began creating his own animated shorts in his home in Richardson, Texas. In 1991, his short film Office Space (also known as the Milton series of shorts) was acquired by Comedy Central, following an animation festival in Dallas. Shortly thereafter, he dropped out of school to focus on his career. In the early 1990s, he was playing blues bass with Doyle Bramhall.

In 1992, he developed Frog Baseball, a short film featuring the characters Beavis and Butt-Head, which was to be featured on Liquid Television, a 1990s animation showcase that appeared on MTV. The short led to the creation of the Beavis and Butt-Head series on MTV, in which Judge voiced both title characters as well as the majority of supporting characters and wrote and directed the majority of the episodes. The show centers on two socially incompetent, heavy metal-loving teenage wannabe delinquents, Beavis and Butt-Head, who live in the fictional town of Highland, Texas. The two have no adult supervision, are dim-witted, sex-obsessed, uneducated, barely literate, and lack any empathy or moral scruples, even regarding each other. Over its run, Beavis and Butt-Head drew a notable amount of both positive and negative reaction from the public with its combination of lewd humor and implied criticism of society.

Judge himself is highly critical of the animation and quality of earlier episodes, in particular the first two – Blood Drive/Give Blood and Door to Door – which he described as "awful, I don't know why anybody liked it ... I was burying my head in the sand." The series spawned the musical single "I Got You Babe" (1993) (a humorous cover with participation by Cher), the feature-length film Beavis and Butt-Head Do America (1996) and the spin-off show Daria.

After a hiatus of two decades, the series aired a new season on October 27, 2011. The premiere episode was a ratings hit, with an audience of 3.3 million total viewers. On January 10, 2014, Judge said that there is still a possibility that Beavis and Butt-Head could be pitched to another network, adding that he wouldn't mind making more episodes.

=== 1997–2009: King of the Hill, Office Space, and Idiocracy ===
In early 1995, after the successful first run of Beavis and Butt-Head, Judge decided to create another animated series, King of the Hill. Judge conceived the idea for the show, designed the main characters, and wrote a pilot script. Fox was uncertain of the viability of Judge's concept for an animated comedy based in reality and set in the American South, so the network teamed him up with The Simpsons writer Greg Daniels. Judge was a former resident of Garland, Texas, upon which the fictional community of Arlen was loosely based, but as Judge stated in a later interview, the show was based more specifically on the Dallas suburb of Richardson. Judge voiced characters Hank Hill and Jeff Boomhauer. The show is about a middle-class Methodist family named the Hills living in a small town called Arlen, Texas. It attempts to retain a naturalistic approach, seeking humor in the conventional and mundane aspects of everyday life while dealing with issues comically. After its debut in 1997, the series became a large success for Fox and was named one of the best television series of the year by various publications, including Entertainment Weekly, Time, and TV Guide.

For the 1997–1998 season, the series became one of Fox's highest-rated programs and even briefly outperformed The Simpsons in ratings. Although ratings remained consistent throughout the 10th, 11th and 12th seasons and had begun to rise in the overall Nielsen ratings (up to the 105th most watched series on television, from 118 in season 8), Fox abruptly announced in 2008 that King of the Hill had been canceled. The cancellation coincided with the announcement that Seth MacFarlane, creator of Family Guy and American Dad!, would be creating a Family Guy spin-off called The Cleveland Show, which would take over King of the Hill's time slot. Hopes to keep the show afloat surfaced as sources indicated that ABC (which was already airing Judge's new animated comedy, The Goode Family) was interested in securing the rights to the show, but in January 2009, ABC president Steve McPherson said he had "no plans to pick up the animated comedy." On April 30, 2009, it was announced that Fox ordered at least two more episodes to give the show a proper finale. The show's 14th season was supposed to air sometime in the 2009–10 season, but Fox later announced that it would not air the episodes, opting instead for syndication. On August 10, 2009, however, Fox released a statement that the network would air a one-hour series finale (which consisted of a regular 30-minute episode followed by a 30-minute finale) on September 13, 2009. The four remaining episodes of the series aired in syndication the week of May 3, 2010, and again on Adult Swim during the week of May 17, 2010. During the panel discussion for the return of Beavis and Butt-Head at San Diego Comic-Con in 2011, Mike Judge said that no current plans exist to revive King of the Hill, although he would not rule out the possibility of it returning.

Judge began to develop one of his four animated short films titled Milton, about an office drone named Milton that Judge created, which first aired on Liquid Television and Night After Night with Allan Havey and later aired on Saturday Night Live. The inspiration came from a temp job he once had that involved alphabetizing purchase orders and a job he had as an engineer for three months in the San Francisco Bay Area during the 1980s, "just in the heart of Silicon Valley and in the middle of that overachiever yuppie thing, it was just awful". Judge sold the completed film Office Space to 20th Century Fox based on his script and a cast that included Jennifer Aniston, Ron Livingston, and David Herman. Originally, the studio wanted to make a film out of the Milton character but Judge was not interested, opting instead to make more of an ensemble cast–based film. The studio suggested that he should make a film like Car Wash but "just set in an office". Judge made the relatively painless transition from animation to live-action with the help of the film's director of photography who taught him about lenses and where to put the camera. Judge says, "I had a great crew, and it's good going into it not pretending you're an expert." Studio executives were not happy with the footage Judge was getting. He remembers them telling him, "More energy! More energy! We gotta reshoot it! You're failing! You're failing!" In addition, Fox did not like the gangsta rap music used in the film until a focus group approved of it. Judge hated the ending and felt that a complete rewrite of the third act was necessary. In the film, he made a cameo appearance as Stan (complete with hairpiece and fake mustache), the manager of Chotchkie's, a fictionalized parody of chain restaurants like Chili's, Applebee's and TGI Friday's, and the boss of Jennifer Aniston's character, whom he continually undermines and interrogates over her lack of sufficient enthusiasm for the job and the insufficient quantity of "flair" (buttons, ribbons, etc.) she wears on her uniform. The film was released on February 19, 1999, and it was well received by critics. Although not particularly successful at the box office, it sold well on VHS and DVD, and it has come to be recognized as a cult classic.

Beginning in fall 2003, Judge and fellow animator Don Hertzfeldt created an animation festival called "The Animation Show". "The Animation Show" toured the country annually for several years, screening animated shorts. In 2005, Judge was presented with the Austin Film Festival's Outstanding Television Writer Award by Johnny Hardwick.

Judge has made supporting and cameo appearances in numerous films. Judge had a voice cameo as Kenny in South Park: Bigger, Longer and Uncut (1999), the feature-length film adaptation of the popular Comedy Central series; he voiced Kenny McCormick when he was unhooded towards the end of the film. He later acted in the science-fiction family comedy franchise Spy Kids, where he played Donnagon Giggles in the first three films. His next film appearance was Serving Sara (2002) where he played a motel manager. He later appeared in the comedy Jackass Number Two (2006), in which he can be seen during the closing credits. An extended version of his sequence can be seen in Jackass 2.5 (2007) which was a direct-to-video release. Judge also created a video clip of Beavis and Butt-Head ripping into Steve-O for his video Poke the Puss, where the two try imagining if they would like the video better if they were black. The clip aired as a part of Jackassworld.com: 24-Hour Takeover, a February 23, 2008, television special on MTV to coincide with the official launch of jackassworld.com. The characters appeared again in the third Jackass film, titled Jackass 3D, at the beginning of the film, telling viewers to put on their 3D glasses for the film.

Judge's third film, Idiocracy, a dystopian comedy starring Luke Wilson and Maya Rudolph, was given a limited release theatrically by 20th Century Fox in September 2006, two years after production. The film's original release date was intended to be on August 5, 2005, according to Mike Judge. In April 2006, a release date was set for September 1, 2006. The film was released without a trailer or substantial marketing campaign. The film was not screened for critics beforehand as is usually done. Lack of concrete information from Fox led to speculation that the distributor may have actively attempted to keep the film from being seen by a large audience, while fulfilling a contractual obligation for theatrical release ahead of a DVD release, according to Ryan Pearson of the AP. That speculation was followed by open criticism of the studio's lack of support from Ain't It Cool News, Time, and Esquire. Time's Joel Stein wrote "the film's ads and trailers tested atrociously", but "still, abandoning Idiocracy seems particularly unjust, since Judge has made a lot of money for Fox." Despite the film not being screened for critics, the film received positive reviews and was a minor box-office success. In the U.S., the film was released to DVD in January 2007 and later aired on premium-television, multiplex channels Cinemax in September 2007 and HBO in January 2008. Since then, it has gained a cult following.

=== 2009–2013: The Goode Family, Extract, and other projects ===
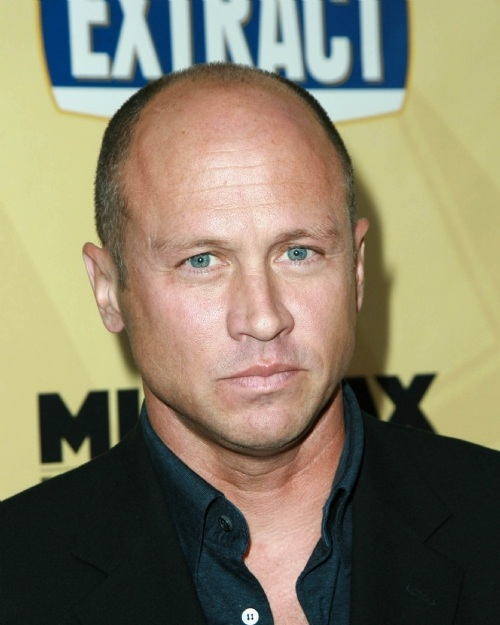
Judge in 2009

Judge's fourth directorial effort was 2009's Extract. Shortly after completing Office Space, Judge was already about 40 pages into his follow-up script, set in the world of an extract factory, when he was convinced by his representative team that he needed to shelve that and concentrate on something more commercial. Over the next several years, he focused his energy on developing Idiocracy. But years later, by the time of the film's release, audiences had decided that Office Space had struck a chord, so they were ready to see Judge return to on-the-job humor, and thus the Extract script was given new life.

Seeking to keep Extract below the radar of the studio system, Judge and his producers set up a production company, Ternion Productions, and arranged private financing while partnering with Miramax for domestic distribution of the film. Judge relied heavily on his own personal knowledge of the industrial world to bring the story to life. "I actually worked in a factory a little bit myself ... I hopefully write stuff that is recognizable as the archetypes of this world," Judge stated.

Keeping true to this baseline of reality, Extract was shot in a working factory, in this case a water bottling plant south of Los Angeles, in the City of Commerce. He makes an uncredited appearance as Jim, a union organizer. The film premiered on September 4, 2009, and received mixed to positive reviews from critics and was a minor commercial success.

Judge's third television series, The Goode Family, debuted on ABC but was canceled after one season. Comedy Central first aired the series in reruns on January 4, 2010. However, the series was pulled off the schedule shortly thereafter. It was confirmed on The Goode Family Facebook page that Comedy Central had picked up the reruns of the series, which were to be evaluated for a chance of being renewed for a second season. On August 8, 2009, however, ABC Entertainment President Steve McPherson stated that the show, along with Surviving Suburbia, had officially been canceled due to low ratings.

In 2010, reruns of The Goode Family aired Monday nights at 10 pm on Comedy Central, beginning January 4. It departed the network's primetime schedule after four weeks, returning occasionally in low-trafficked timeslots.

In 2012, Judge directed the music video (animation by Titmouse) for country music group Zac Brown Band's "The Wind". In 2013, Judge collaborated with Seth MacFarlane on a mashup episode of Family Guy, in which, complete with a Hill-themed opening, Judge reprises his role as Hank Hill. Earlier in 2010 and 2012, Judge played cameos as Hank on two episodes of MacFarlane's The Cleveland Show.

=== 2014–2019: Silicon Valley and Tales from the Tour Bus ===
Judge created his fourth show, Silicon Valley, with King of the Hill executive producers John Altschuler and Dave Krinsky. The HBO comedy is a single-camera live-action sitcom set in Northern California. One of its main themes is the idea that "the people most qualified to succeed are the least capable of handling success". The first season of Silicon Valley was 8 episodes long and received critical and public acclaim. Silicon Valley was renewed for a second season on April 21, 2014, and a third season on April 13, 2015. Silicon Valley aired its fourth season, which premiered on April 23, 2017. The series was renewed for a fifth season, which premiered on March 25, 2018, and a sixth season, which premiered on October 27, 2019, and served as its final season.

On January 12, 2017, Deadline confirmed that Cinemax ordered 8 episodes of Judge's new animated series, Mike Judge Presents: Tales from the Tour Bus. The series premiered on September 22, 2017. Judge wrote the story for Action Point, the film was released in 2018. That year he starred in the film, The Front Runner. In 2019, Judge announced he had been developing two projects for HBO: QualityLand and A5, both of which were later scrapped by HBO in 2021.

=== 2020–present: Bandera Entertainment, Beavis and Butt-Head and King of the Hill revivals ===
In June 2020, Comedy Central announced it had ordered a second revival of Beavis and Butt-Head consisting of two new seasons along with spin-offs and specials. In the new series, Beavis and Butt-Head will enter a "whole new Gen Z world" with meta-themes that are said to be relatable to both new fans, who may be unfamiliar with the original series, and old.

In February 2022, it was announced that the revival would instead premiere on Paramount+, following a second Beavis and Butt-Head feature film entitled Beavis and Butt-Head Do the Universe. Originally, Paramount executives wanted a live-action Beavis and Butt-Head movie. Judge held auditions over Zoom for the project. He eventually talked the company into doing an animated movie instead to reestablish the characters first, with a future live-action movie still a possibility. In June 2022, it was confirmed that new episodes would debut later that year, along with the full library of over 227 original episodes, newly remastered, with music videos intact. One month later, it was announced that the revival would premiere on August 4, 2022. Season 9 continues the concept of the Beavis and Butt-Head multiverse initially explored in Beavis and Butt-Head Do the Universe. Teenage Beavis and Butt-Head, Old Beavis and Butt-Head, and Smart Beavis and Butt-Head all get their own dedicated episodes in the revival.

In January 2022, it was announced that Judge and Daniels had formed an animation company called Bandera Entertainment, with a revival of King of the Hill being one of several series in development. During a panel at San Diego Comic-Con in 2022, Judge stated that the show "has a very good chance of coming back." In September 2022, Fox Entertainment president Michael Thorn confirmed that the series would not air on Fox, with the reason being that Fox prefers to have full ownership of whatever new shows they air. On January 31, 2023, a revival on Hulu was officially confirmed to be ordered.

Bandera's first produced series is Anna Drezen's Praise Petey starring Annie Murphy, John Cho, and Stephen Root among others. The series premiered on July 21, 2023, on Freeform and Hulu, and has received mostly positive reviews, with Rotten Tomatoes ratings of 80% Fresh from critics, and 90% Fresh from audiences. The series was canceled after one season. In 2024, Judge, along with Zach Woods and Brandon Gardner, co-created the series In the Know. The series premiered on January 25, 2024, on Peacock. Judge also produced the Netflix animated series created by Matthew Inman and Shane Kosakowski, entitled Exploding Kittens. Based on the popular card game of the same name, it was released on July 12, 2024, to mixed to negative reviews. It was cancelled after its only season. His new show, Common Side Effects currently airs on Adult Swim and is streaming on Max.

== Personal life ==
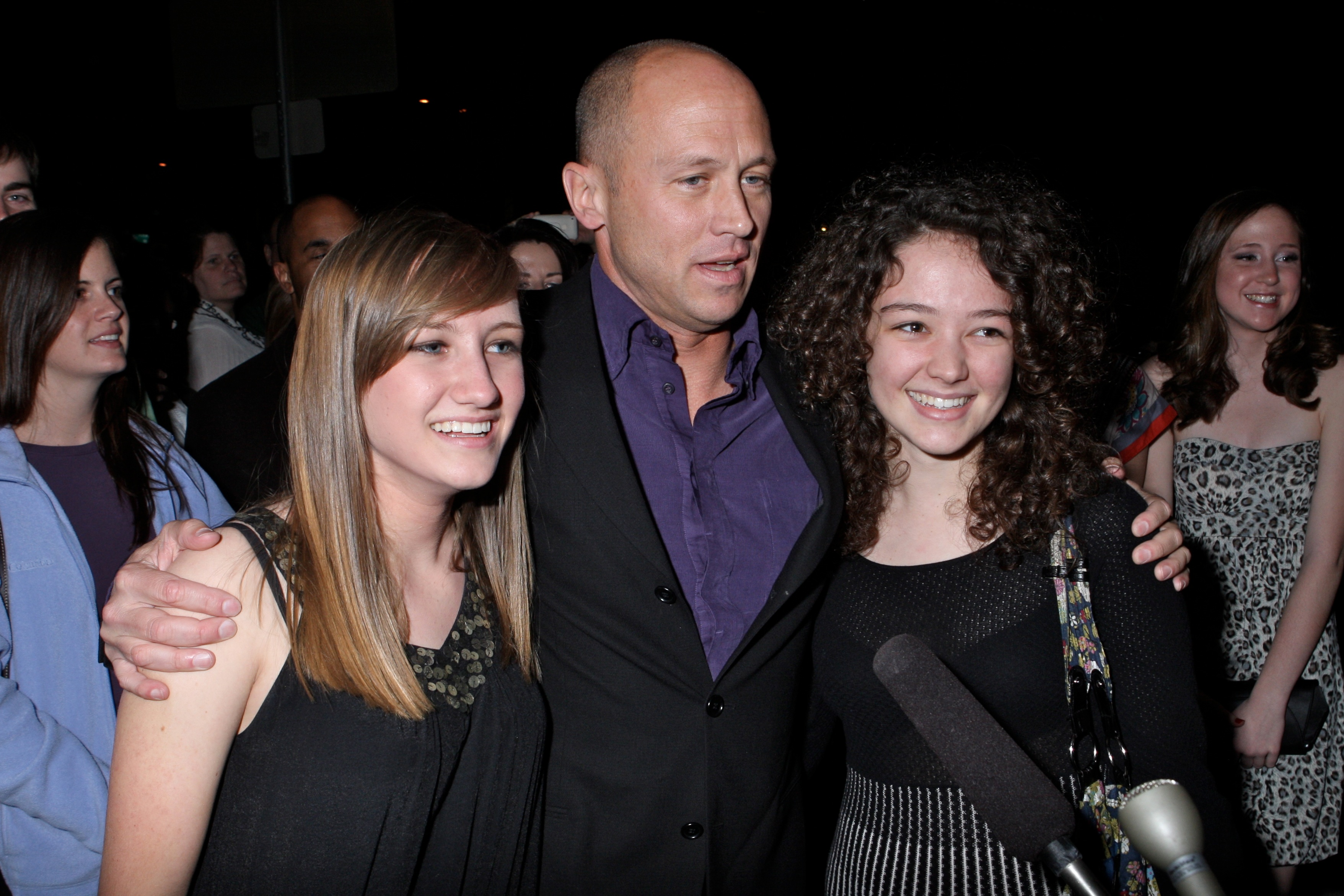
Judge with his daughters at the Paramount Theatre (Austin, Texas), February 8, 2009

Judge married Francesca Morocco in 1989; they divorced in 2009. Together they have two daughters. The family lives in Austin, Texas, and Santa Monica, California, having previously resided in Malibu. Judge is a fan of the Ultimate Fighting Championship (UFC).

=== Political views ===
While King of the Hill is often a satire of protagonist Hank Hill, generally identifiable as holding socially and politically conservative views, and his The Goode Family is essentially a satire centered on a liberal family, Judge avoids discussing his own political leanings.

In reviewing Idiocracy, Salon stated, "Judge's gimlet eye is so ruthless that at times his politics seem to border on South Park libertarianism". A writer for the libertarian magazine Reason seems to agree, comparing King of the Hill to the anti-authoritarian point of view of South Park and The Simpsons, though he calls the show more populist, noting the disdain King of the Hill seems to have for bureaucrats, professionals, and big-box chains.

Still, Judge denies having political messages in his shows, saying in 2006 in an IGN interview about King of the Hill:

I try to not let the show get too political. To me, it's more social than political I guess you'd say, because that's funnier. I don't really like political reference humor that much. Although I liked the episode 'Hank's Bully' where Hank's talking to the mailman and he says, 'Why would anyone want to lick a stamp that has Bill Clinton on it?' To me that's just like more of a character thing about Hank than it is a political joke or anything. I don't want to do a bunch of stuff about the war, particularly.

In June 2016, before the presidential election in November, Etan Cohen told BuzzFeed that he and Judge would produce Idiocracy-themed campaign advertisements mocking Donald Trump's presidential campaign if given permission from 20th Century Fox to do so. It was later reported by Business Insider that they would not have been campaign ads, would have mocked all of the candidates, and would not go forward.
