= Busy work =

Work that creates only an illusion of value

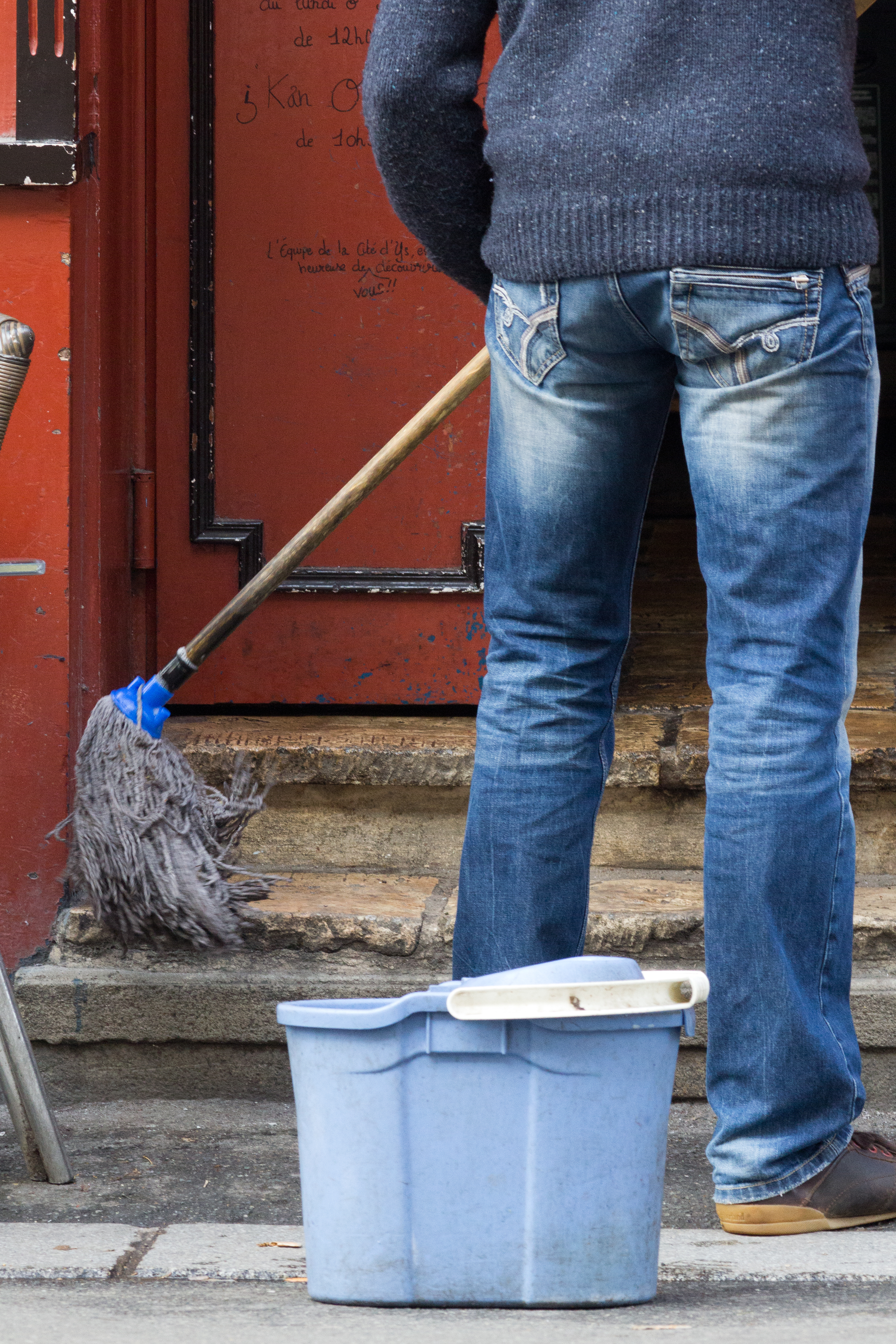
Chores such as mopping outdoors can be busy work.

Busy work (also known as make-work and busywork) is an activity that is undertaken to pass time and stay busy but has little or no actual value. Busy work occurs in business, military, and other settings in situations where people may be required to be present but may lack the opportunities, skills, or need to do something more productive. People may engage in busy work to maintain an appearance of activity to avoid criticism of being inactive or idle.

== Education and work settings ==
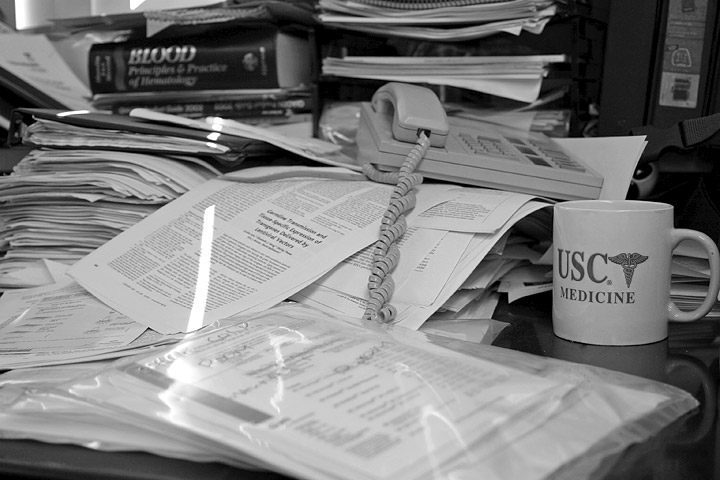
The constant processing of paperwork can be a form of busy work, particularly in situations when it is a lower priority compared to other tasks.

In business and work settings, people may engage in busy work to maintain an appearance of activity to protect their employment status (to avoid termination or sanctions).

Workers believe it is more important to maintain a constant appearance of working urgently so that they and others believe that what is being done is important. Constant urgency in workers can lead to disproportionate distribution of actual work, as workers may put off essential work by attempting to complete previously designated less critical tasks. Maintaining very high levels of constant busyness may actually be detrimental to the operations of a business or organization in which new tasks are not undertaken in a timely manner because workers are always very busy. That can also lead to workers taking shortcuts to accomplish tasks more quickly, which can negatively affect the quality of work results.

Busy work also can be counterproductive in work settings because it may not be aligned with the overall objectives and priorities of an organization's plans for attaining and maintaining success in its ventures. The assumption that activity in the workplace is more important than productivity in the workplace can lead to employees thinking that quantity of work is better than quality of work. This is not productive to the overall functioning of a business.

== See also ==
- Bullshit Jobs: A Theory, a 2018 book by anthropologist David Graeber
- Parkinson's law
- Boondoggle
- Handwaving
- Make-work job
- Pastime
- Presenteeism
- Underemployment
