= Boxed In =

Boxed In may refer to:

- Boxed In (musician), British singer, songwriter, and record producer
- "Boxed In" (Beavis and Butt-Head), a 2022 episode of the American animated television series Beavis and Butt-Head
- "Boxed In" (Prison Break), an episode of the television series Prison Break
- "boXed in", an episode of The Gifted
