= List of Beavis and Butt-Head episodes =

The following is an episode list for the MTV adult animated television series Beavis and Butt-Head. The series has its roots in 1992 when Mike Judge created two animated shorts, Frog Baseball and Peace, Love and Understanding, which were aired on Liquid Television.

== Series overview ==
Season	Episodes	Originally released		
Season	Episodes	First released	Last released	Network
Pilots	2	September 22, 1992	November 17, 1992	MTV (Liquid Television)
1	3	March 8, 1993	March 25, 1993	MTV
2	26	May 17, 1993	July 15, 1993	MTV
3	31	September 6, 1993	March 5, 1994	MTV
4	32	March 14, 1994	July 15, 1994	MTV
5	50	October 31, 1994	October 12, 1995	MTV
6	20	October 31, 1995	March 7, 1996	MTV
Do America		December 20, 1996		—N/a
7	41	January 26, 1997	November 28, 1997	MTV
8	22	October 27, 2011	December 29, 2011	MTV
Do the Universe		June 23, 2022		Paramount+
9	23	August 4, 2022	October 13, 2022	Paramount+
10	27	April 20, 2023	June 29, 2023	Paramount+
11	30	September 3, 2025	December 10, 2025	Comedy Central
12	27	October 14, 2026	December 16, 2026	Comedy Central

== Episodes ==
=== Pilots (1992) ===
These originally aired as part of Liquid Television and did not include music videos.

No. overall	No. in season	Title	Original release date
0A	1	Frog Baseball	September 22, 1992 (Liquid Television); March 11, 1993
Beavis and Butt-Head play baseball with an unsuspecting frog, leading to the utter demise of the smashed amphibian. Featured videos: The original Liquid Television airings of Frog Baseball do not feature music videos. These were only added when the series moved to MTV. Version A: David Lee Roth – "Yankee Rose"; Kiss – "Rock and Roll All Nite"; Guns N' Roses – "Garden of Eden"; Technotronic featuring Ya Kid K – "Move This"; Gwar – "The Road Behind"; Sir Mix-a-Lot – "Baby Got Back"; LL Cool J – "Big Ole Butt"; Wreckx-n-Effect – "Rump Shaker"; Sir Mix-a-Lot – "Baby Got Back" (partial); Version B: Milli Vanilli – "Girl You Know It's True"; ZZ Top – "Legs"; Guns N' Roses – "Garden of Eden"; Dire Straits – "Walk of Life"; Nine Inch Nails – "Head Like a Hole"; Wilson Phillips – "Release Me"; Judas Priest – "Painkiller"; Note: The Liquid Television version of Frog Baseball added a new end title card featuring a still from the episode where Butt-Head hits Beavis with a baseball bat. A disclaimer states that no animals were harmed in the making of the episode, except Beavis.
0B	2	Peace, Love and Understanding	November 17, 1992 (Liquid Television); March 10, 1993
Beavis and Butt-Head go to a monster truck rally, and end up buried in feces when a truck crashes through some port-a-potties which were the temple of Sterculius, the Roman god of feces.: This marks the first appearance of Mr. Van Driessen.; Featured videos: The original Liquid Television airings of Peace, Love and Understanding do not feature music videos. These were only added when the series moved to MTV. Version A: Biz Markie – "Spring Again"; Jane's Addiction – "Been Caught Stealing"; Mötley Crüe – "Kickstart My Heart"; Bob Geldof – "The Great Song of Indifference"; Technotronic featuring Ya Kid K – "Move This"; Guns N' Roses – "Paradise City"; Version B: Don Johnson – "Heartbeat"; Jane's Addiction – "Been Caught Stealing"; Mötley Crüe – "Kickstart My Heart"; Good Girls – "It Must Be Love"; Guns N' Roses – "Paradise City"; Version C: Joey Lawrence – "Nothin' My Love Can't Fix"; Biz Markie – "Spring Again"; Jane's Addiction – "Been Caught Stealing"; Mötley Crüe – "Kickstart My Heart"; Bob Geldof – "The Great Song of Indifference"; Wreckx-n-Effect – "Rump Shaker"; Guns N' Roses – "Paradise City"

=== Season 1 (1993) ===
Mike Judge himself is highly critical of the animation and quality of these episodes, in particular the first two—"Door to Door" and "Give Blood/Blood Drive"—which he described as "Horrible. Those first two episodes were awful, I don't know why anybody liked it... I was burying my head in the sand."

No. overall	No. in season	Title	Directed by	Written by	Original release date
1	1	"Door-to-Door"	J.J. Sedelmaier	Glenn Eichler and David Felton	March 8, 1993
Mr. Van Driessen gives the class the assignment to go door-to-door to collect for charity. While collecting, Beavis and Butt-Head run into a scary donor: Mistress Cora Anthrax. This was the first episode of the series to air. Featured videos: Version A: Guns N' Roses – "Garden of Eden"; Sir Mix-a-Lot – "Baby Got Back"; Madonna – "Erotica"; Nine Inch Nails – "Head Like a Hole"; Life, Sex & Death – "School's for Fools"; Version B: Suicidal Tendencies – "Send Me Your Money"; Sir Mix-a-Lot – "Baby Got Back"; Madonna – "Erotica"; Nine Inch Nails – "Head Like a Hole"; Life, Sex & Death – "School's for Fools"; Version C: Suicidal Tendencies – "Send Me Your Money"; Milli Vanilli – "Girl You Know It's True"; Richard Marx – "Take This Heart"; Wilson Phillips – "Release Me"; Life, Sex & Death – "School's for Fools"; Version D: Clips of the civil defense film "A Hurricane Called Betsy", with Scorpions – "Rock You Like a Hurricane" playing as background music
2	2	"Give Blood"	J.J. Sedelmaier	Glenn Eichler and David Felton	March 8, 1993
Beavis and Butt-Head donate blood in hopes of raking in the cash, giving a little more than they planned to. The episode is sometimes entitled "Blood Drive". Featured videos: Version A: Olivia Newton-John – "Physical"; Ramones – "I Wanna Be Sedated"; Big Daddy Kane featuring Barry White – "All of Me"; Judas Priest – "Painkiller"; Concrete Blonde – "Bloodletting (The Vampire Song)"; Version B: Sinéad O'Connor – "Nothing Compares 2 U"; Megadeth – "Symphony of Destruction (The Gristle Mix)"; Scatterbrain – "Don't Call Me Dude"; Jackyl – "The Lumberjack"
3	3	"Balloon"	J.J. Sedelmaier	Glenn Eichler and David Felton	March 25, 1993
Beavis and Butt-Head visit an aquarium in hopes of plugging some dolphin holes with balloons. Featured videos: Version A: Red Hot Chili Peppers – "Higher Ground"; "Chili" misspelled as "Chile"; Slim Whitman – "I Remember You"; Mistakenly identified as "Paloma Blanca"; RuPaul – "Supermodel (You Better Work)"; Faith No More – "Falling to Pieces"; AC/DC – "Dirty Deeds Done Dirt Cheap (Live)"; Version B: Pat Benatar – "Love Is a Battlefield"; Slim Whitman – "I Remember You"; Mistakenly identified as "Paloma Blanca"; RuPaul – "Supermodel (You Better Work)"; Faith No More – "Falling to Pieces"; AC/DC – "Dirty Deeds Done Dirt Cheap (Live)"; Version C: Michael Jackson – "Black or White"; R.E.M. - "Drive"; Slim Whitman – "I Remember You"; Mistakenly identified as "Paloma Blanca"; Faith No More – "Falling to Pieces"; Red Hot Chili Peppers – "Higher Ground"; "Chili" misspelled as "Chile"

=== Season 2 (1993) ===
No. overall	No. in season	Title	Directed by	Written by	Original release date
4	1	"Scientific Stuff"	J.J. Sedelmaier	David Felton and Chris Kreski	May 17, 1993
Daria is forced to work with Beavis and Butt-Head on a project, and she sets out to prove that the duo's stupidity can be scientifically explained.: This episode marks the first appearance of Daria Morgendorffer.; Featured videos: Oingo Boingo – "Weird Science"; The Cult – "Fire Woman"; Danzig – "How the Gods Kill"; INXS – "Devil Inside"; Faith No More – "Epic"
5	2	"Good Credit"	J.J. Sedelmaier	Mike Judge	May 17, 1993
Beavis and Butt-Head acquire and use Mr. Anderson's credit card at the local pet shop.: This episode marks the first appearance of Mr. Anderson.; Featured videos: Loverboy – "Working for the Weekend"; The Bangles – "Manic Monday"; At least one early airing of this episode had Jane's Addiction – "Been Caught Stealing" in place of the Loverboy and Bangles music videos; Ramones – "Pet Sematary"; John Mellencamp – "Pop Singer"; Soundgarden – "Rusty Cage"
6	3	"Burger World"	J.J. Sedelmaier	Chris Kreski	May 18, 1993
Mr. Anderson waits 20 minutes for his meal at Burger World, the drive-thru where Beavis and Butt-Head work. They end up serving him a fried mouse and bugs. Featured videos: Jeremy Jordan – "The Right Kind of Love"; ZZ Top – "Legs"; Biohazard – "Punishment"; Deee-Lite – "Groove Is in the Heart"
7	4	"Baby Makes Uh, Three"	J.J. Sedelmaier	Mike Judge and Glenn Eichler	May 18, 1993
Coach Buzzcut attempts to teach family skills to Beavis and Butt-Head's class by giving boy–girl pairs sacks of sugar to "raise". Because no one else will work with them, Buzzcut has Beavis and Butt-Head play a non-traditional couple. The boys fail the project after they throw their sack of sugar in a river.: This episode marks the first appearance of Coach Buzzcut.; Featured videos: U2 – "One"; Aerosmith – "Rag Doll"; Katrina and the Waves – "Walking on Sunshine"; Garth Brooks – "The Thunder Rolls"; Nine Inch Nails – "Wish"; Megadeth - "Train of Consequences" (Germany only)
8	5	"Beware of the Butt"	J.J. Sedelmaier	David Felton and Chris Kreski	May 19, 1993
Beavis and Butt-Head take an embarrassing picture of a large woman at the drive-in and she seeks revenge. Censorship: This episode was first shown with Butt-Head moving a letter "F" very close to the "UCKER" on the sign at the drive-in entrance. In subsequent airings this scene was cut short before the "F" could get close. Featured videos: David Lee Roth – "Yankee Rose"; L7 – "Pretend We're Dead"; Helmet – "Unsung"; Nelson – "(Can't Live Without Your) Love and Affection"; Gwar – "The Road Behind"
9	6	"At the Sideshow"	J.J. Sedelmaier	Glenn Eichler	May 19, 1993
Beavis and Butt-Head attend a freak show and try to score with the Rubber Band Lady. Featured videos: Aerosmith – "Livin' on the Edge"; The Jacksons – "Torture"; Culture Club – "Karma Chameleon"; Talking Heads – "Wild Wild Life"; Michael Damian – "Rock On" (replaced the Aerosmith music video in later airings); Golden Earring – "Twilight Zone" (replaced the Aerosmith music video in later airings)
10	7	"Customers Suck"	Yvette Kaplan	Mike Judge	May 20, 1993
Beavis and Butt-Head alternately do not want to and cannot help customers who need assistance.: This episode marks the first appearances of Principal McVicker and Mr. Stevenson.; Featured videos: Public Image Ltd – "Rise"; Wang Chung – "Everybody Have Fun Tonight"; Wham! – "Wake Me Up Before You Go-Go"; The Pursuit of Happiness – "Cigarette Dangles"; Nirvana – "Smells Like Teen Spirit"
11	8	"Sick"	J.J. Sedelmaier	Chris Kreski and Glenn Eichler	May 20, 1993
The duo get a nasty cold and go to the hospital to try and get a hold of some cough syrup in a futile attempt to get intoxicated. Featured videos: Mötley Crüe – "Dr. Feelgood"; Billy Idol – "Dancing with Myself"; New Kids on the Block – "Hangin' Tough"; Alice in Chains – "Them Bones"
12	9	"Home Improvement"	Yvette Kaplan	Mike Judge	May 24, 1993
Beavis and Butt-Head are hired to paint the trim of Mr. Anderson's house, but excessively sniffing paint thinner causes them to take a more creative – and destructive – approach.: In a deleted scene, the duo mention Stewart Stevenson for the first time. Stewart's first character appearance would be in a later episode.; Featured videos: Frankie Goes to Hollywood – "Two Tribes"; Biz Markie – "Just a Friend"; White Zombie – "Black Sunshine"; Edie Brickell & New Bohemians – "What I Am"
13–14	10–11	"Way Down Mexico Way"	J.J. Sedelmaier	Geoff Whelan	May 26, 1993
Part 1: Beavis and Butt-Head head to Mexico with their friend, Dave, in an effort to obtain illegal fireworks, but instead make a run for the bathroom after a taco stand owner gets revenge on the duo for feeding his dog hot sauce by putting even hotter sauce in their tacos. Featured videos: Wall of Voodoo – "Mexican Radio"; Pantera – "Psycho Holiday"; Ofra Haza – "Im Nin'alu"; Cycle Sluts from Hell – "I Wish You Were a Beer"; Depeche Mode – "I Feel You"; Some airings had Texas Tornados – "Adios Mexico" in place of this video. This only occurred when this part aired without Part 2 following.; Part 2: During the ride back to the U.S., Dave forces Beavis and Butt-Head to smuggle pills by swallowing condoms full of them, but the duo forget to tie them up. When the three of them are pulled over by border patrol, Beavis and Butt-Head are severely intoxicated.: A disclaimer on the episode states that "If you're not a cartoon, swallowing a rubber full of drugs can kill you."; This episode has never been released on home video in the United States and many countries due to its controversial content, including that of Beavis and Butt-Head swallowing condoms full of drugs. However it was released on VHS in the United Kingdom as part of the Too Dumb for TV compilation in 2000, featuring a selection of controversial and seldom aired episodes, but which still contained several minor edits.; Featured videos: Gerardo Mejía – "Rico Suave"; Ministry – "N.W.O."; Soundgarden – "Outshined"; AC/DC – "Highway to Hell (Live)"; Texas Tornados – "Adios Mexico"
15	12	"At the Movies"	J.J. Sedelmaier	Chris Kreski, David Felton and Jim Turner	May 31, 1993
Beavis and Butt-Head return to the drive-in theater. They blow up the bathrooms, raid the concession stand, and mock an incompetent security guard who shoots himself in the foot while trying to arrest them. Featured videos: Kool Moe Dee – "Wild Wild West"; The Power Station – "Get It On (Bang a Gong)"; House of Pain – "Shamrocks and Shenanigans (Boom Shalock Lock Boom)"; The Sugarcubes – "Walkabout"; AC/DC – "You Shook Me All Night Long"
16–17	13–14	"No Laughing"	Yvette Kaplan	Mike Judge	June 2, 1993
Part 1: Principal McVicker attempts a radical solution to Beavis and Butt-Head's stupidity and continuous laughing in class: they cannot laugh at anything they hear for a week, or risk being expelled and sent to a different high school. Featured videos: Ween – "Push th' Little Daisies"; Carmen Electra – "Everybody Get on Up"; Butthole Surfers – "Who Was in My Room Last Night?"; Beastie Boys – "So What'cha Want"; Part 2: Beavis and Butt-Head struggle hugely to avoid laughing during Coach Buzzcut's sexual education class. Featured videos: Amy Grant – "Baby, Baby"; Toni Basil – "Mickey"; Scorpions – "Rock You Like a Hurricane", Reba McEntire – "Take It Back"; Duran Duran – "Come Undone"; Corrosion of Conformity – "Dance of the Dead"
18	15	"The Butt-Head Experience"	Yvette Kaplan	Mike Judge	June 7, 1993
During a boring day at Burger World, Butt-Head falls asleep and dreams about being in a rock band with Beavis. Featured videos: Winger – "Seventeen"; Nudeswirl – "F-Sharp"; Kiss – "I Love It Loud"; Eddie Murphy – "Put Your Mouth on Me"; A-ha – "Take On Me"; Big Country – "In a Big Country"
19	16	"Lawn and Garden"	Yvette Kaplan	Mike Judge	June 9, 1993
Beavis and Butt-Head are ordered to prune the top of Mr. Anderson's tree, but take a disastrous shortcut on their job by sawing through the trunk. The tree falls on his house and power lines, which fells utility poles onto parked cars. Featured videos: Doctor and the Medics – "Spirit in the Sky"; David Lee Roth – "Just Like Paradise"; Kris Kross – "Warm It Up"; Digital Underground – "The Humpty Dance"
20	17	"Stewart's House"	J.J. Sedelmaier	Chris Kreski and Geoff Whelan	June 14, 1993
Beavis and Butt-Head go to Stewart's house to watch a pay-per-view special, but get bored with it. As a result, the duo turn to tormenting Stewart and wrecking the house as a form of entertainment.: This episode was banned from MTV runs because of the scene where Beavis and Butt-Head inhale stove gas and blow up Stewart's kitchen.; This episode marks the first appearance of Stewart Stevenson.; Featured videos: The Cars – "You Might Think"; Art of Noise (with Tom Jones (singer)) – "Kiss"; Twisted Sister – "I Wanna Rock"; Spinal Tap – "The Majesty of Rock"
21	18	"For Better or Verse"	J.J. Sedelmaier	Glenn Eichler and Geoff Whelan	June 17, 1993
Mr. Van Driessen makes Beavis and Butt-Head write haikus in class. Featured videos: Debbie Gibson – "Out of the Blue"; Black Sabbath – "Iron Man"; Das EFX – "They Want EFX"; Fishbone – "Fight the Youth"
22	19	"Bedpans & Broomsticks"	J.J. Sedelmaier	David Felton and Chris Kreski	June 21, 1993
Beavis and Butt-Head torment a post-heart surgery patient, Billy Bob, by stealing his scooter and crashing it. Featured videos: Joe Cocker – "Unchain My Heart"; Izzy Stradlin – "Shuffle It All"; D.R.I. – "Acid Rain"; Enuff Z'Nuff – "Fly High Michelle"; King Missile – "Detachable Penis"
23	20	"Babes 'R' Us"	J.J. Sedelmaier	Mike Judge and Bo Weinberg	June 23, 1993
Beavis and Butt-Head try out for a mud wrestling act at the local strip club, but are turned down because they are underage. Featured videos: Salt-N-Pepa – "Push It"; Bobby Brown – "Humpin' Around"; Babes in Toyland – "Bruise Violet"; R.E.M. – "Pop Song 89"; Butthole Surfers – "Dust Devil" (replaced the Babes in Toyland music video in later airings); Marianne Rosenberg - "Er Gehört zu Mir" (Germany only)
24	21	"Yogurt's Cool"	J.J. Sedelmaier	Glenn Eichler and Tina Hong	June 28, 1993
Beavis and Butt-Head buy frozen yogurt but are unimpressed by the taste of it. When refused a refund, they take a messy revenge on the mall. Featured videos: Rick James – "Superfreak"; Scandal – "Goodbye to You"; T'Pau – "Heart and Soul"; White Zombie – "Thunder Kiss '65"; Jane's Addiction – "Mountain Song"
25	22	"Heroes"	Unknown	Joe Stillman	June 30, 1993
Beavis and Butt-Head go to a skeet shooting range, where they cause a Boeing 747 to crash by firing too high into the air.: This episode was banned from MTV reruns because of Butt-Head shooting down the airplane. It has never been released on home video.; Featured videos: The Cramps – "Bikini Girls with Machine Guns"; Grim Reaper – "See You in Hell"; King's X – "Black Flag"; Nitzer Ebb – "Godhead"
26	23	"Sign Here"	J.J. Sedelmaier	Chris Kreski and Glenn Eichler	July 6, 1993
Mr. Van Driessen gives the class an assignment to petition against a fur shop opening in town. Beavis and Butt-Head conclude that "petitions are stupid" but still end up getting the signatures of "Hugh G. Rection", "Ben Dover", and "Rosie Palm" and her "5 sisters". Featured videos: Hall & Oates – "Maneater"; Def Leppard – "Animal"; Huey Lewis and the News – "I Want a New Drug"; The Dead Milkmen – "Smokin' Banana Peels"; Young MC – "Principal's Office"; Red Hot Chili Peppers – "Show Me Your Soul"
27	24	"Washing the Dog"	J.J. Sedelmaier	David Felton and Jim Turner	July 8, 1993
Beavis and Butt-Head volunteer to wash Mr. Anderson's dog in hopes that he would leave them money in his will. Featured videos: Porno for Pyros – "Pets"; Soundgarden – "Outshined"; Black Box – "Everybody Everybody"; Stray Cats – "Rock This Town"
28	25	"Friday Night"	Yvette Kaplan	Joe Stillman	July 14, 1993
Beavis and Butt-Head hang out at Maxi-Mart in an attempt to pick up chicks and meet a biker chick who uses them to shoplift. Featured videos: Gerardo Mejía – "Rico Suave"; Bow Wow Wow – "I Want Candy"; Gruntruck – "Crazy Love"; Color Me Badd – "I Wanna Sex You Up"; Terence Trent D'Arby – "She Kissed Me"; Gum - "Poison Me" (Germany only)
29	26	"Be All You Can Be"	J.J. Sedelmaier	Kristofor Brown	July 15, 1993
Beavis and Butt-Head ponder enlisting in the U.S. Army as "Major Woody" and "Private Parts", but run afoul of Col. Dick Leakey. The boys end up causing havoc with some bullets and an active grenade. Featured videos: Quiet Riot – "Cum on Feel the Noize"; Ministry – "NWO"; AC/DC – "Highway to Hell"; Life, Sex & Death – "Tank"

=== Season 3 (1993–94) ===
No. overall	No. in season	Title	Written by	Original release date
30	1	"Comedians"	Mike Judge	September 6, 1993
The duo go to a comedy club where Butt-Head's stand-up comedy fails. When Beavis takes his turn on stage, he sets fire to the building after burning newspapers with which to juggle.: This episode was blamed for a fire-related incident in Ohio.; Featured videos: Primus – "My Name Is Mud"; Tiffany – "I Think We're Alone Now"; Vince Neil – "Sister of Pain"; Belly – "Feed the Tree"
31	2	"Carwash"	Guy Maxtone-Graham	September 6, 1993
The two are hired to wash a Chevrolet Corvair in order to pay for new TV remote batteries, but decide to take it for a ride. They stop on a junction, where another car crashes into it. Featured videos: 24-7 Spyz – "Stuntman"; Bon Jovi – "In These Arms"; Vanessa Williams – "Work to Do"
32	3	"Couch-Fishing"	David S. Cohen	September 7, 1993
The two search their couch for interesting items to use as bait to fish out of their window onto the street while they sit on their couch. They catch a raccoon, Stewart, and an elderly woman. The woman leaves, but Stewart sticks around in the hopes of being accepted as cool. Butt-Head sees a police car outside and hands the fishing rod to Stewart. A policeman kicks the door down to find Stewart holding the fishing rod, and arrests him. Featured videos: INXS – "Not Enough Time"; Danzig – "Mother"; Suicidal Tendencies – "Institutionalized"; Bee Gees – "Jive Talkin'"
33	4	"Incognito"	Geoff Whelan	September 8, 1993
Under threat of possible death from Earl, a gun-toting classmate, the duo assume ridiculous disguises and pretend to be exchange students. When someone outside the class fires at them, the two exonerate Earl, and in gratitude, Earl spares their lives.: This episode was banned from MTV reruns because of its glorification of guns in school. It has never been released on home video.; Featured videos: Run–D.M.C. – "Down with the King"; Megadeth – "Sweating Bullets"; Frank Black – "Los Angeles"
34	5	"Kidnapped"	Unknown	September 8, 1993
The duo conceive a plot to kidnap Stewart for ransom so they can attend a heavy metal concert. Featured videos: Kix – "Cool Kids"; Kylie Minogue – "Locomotion"; Raging Slab – "Anywhere but Here"; White Zombie – "Welcome to Planet Motherfucker"
35	6	"Kidnapped, Part II"	Unknown	September 8, 1993
The duo's plot backfires when they realise the oblivious Stewart is too annoying to have around. Featured videos: Led Zeppelin – "Over the Hills and Far Away"; The Shamen – "Ebeneezer Goode"; Blondie – "Rapture"; Beastie Boys – "Gratitude"
36	7	"Naked Colony"	Joe Stillman	September 13, 1993
Beavis and Butt-Head, upon discovering the concept of a nudist colony, attempt to join one. They cannot afford the membership fee, so they climb over the wall. Featured videos: Stone Temple Pilots – "Plush"; Karyn White – "The Way I Feel About You"; Cycle Sluts From Hell – "I Wish You Were a Beer"; Odds – "Heterosexual Man"
37	8	"Tornado"	Jerry Lampini	September 14, 1993
The duo go storm chasing upon hearing a tornado is about to hit, when they visit a trailer park and meet two girls who want to have sex for the last time. The tornado hits just as the boys make their move. They survive, while the girls end up in the Land of Oz. Featured videos: Ministry – "Just One Fix"; Accept – "Balls to the Wall"; Samantha Fox – "Naughty Girls (Need Love Too)"; PJ Harvey – "50ft Queenie"
38	9	"Cleaning House"	Don London	September 20, 1993
Beavis and Butt-Head are hired by Mr. Van Driessen to clean his house, but the duo end up destroying his entire 8-track tape collection. Featured videos: Krokus – "School's Out"; The Mission – "Like a Child Again"; Army of Lovers – "Crucified"
39	10	"Scratch 'n' Win"	Michael Dugan	September 21, 1993
The duo get a dollar and win $500 by buying a lottery ticket. They then buy a riding mower, which they use to cut a circle-A in the lawn in front of Highland High School. Featured videos: ZZ Top – "Viva Las Vegas"; MARRS – "Pump Up the Volume"; Alien Sex Fiend – "Now I'm Feeling Zombified"; Ugly Kid Joe – "Neighbor"
40	11	"Scared Straight"	Kristofor Brown	September 27, 1993
Principal McVicker restarts a Scared Straight program and the duo find themselves having fun in prison. Featured videos: Judas Priest – "Breaking the Law"; Plasmatics – "The Damned"; AC/DC – "Highway to Hell (Live)" (substitute video for "The Damned"); U2 – "Lemon" (alternative substitute for "The Damned"); The Dead Milkmen – "Punk Rock Girl"
41	12	"Eating Contest"	Glenn Eichler	September 30, 1993
Beavis and Butt-Head enter a bratwurst-eating contest. They are unaware of and unable to pay the entrance fee, so they have to work with frogs to pay it. Featured videos: U2 – "Mysterious Ways"; Circus of Power – "Heaven or Hell"; David Lee Roth – "Just a Gigolo/I Ain't Got Nobody"
42	13	"Sporting Goods"	Glenn Eichler	October 4, 1993
Coach Buzzcut orders Beavis and Butt-Head to buy jockstraps for gym class because neither of them have any. The store's smallest supporters are too big for both of them, so they are given eyepatches instead, which Daria writes about in the school paper. Featured videos: Red Hot Chili Peppers – "Breaking the Girl"; DJ Jazzy Jeff & The Fresh Prince – "Girls Ain't Nothing But Trouble"
43	14	"Sperm Bank"	Guy Maxtone-Graham	October 7, 1993
The duo sell sperm at the offices of Dr. Rod Johnson, and buy porn magazines with the money. Featured videos: Peter Gabriel – "Sledgehammer"; Pantera – "Mouth for War"; Siouxsie and the Banshees – "Peek-a-Boo"; Red Hot Chili Peppers – "Suck My Kiss"
44	15	"Buff 'n' Stuff"	Bo Weinberg	October 14, 1993
Disgusted with their pathetic physiques, Coach Buzzcut decides to enlist Beavis and Butt-Head in a weight training course. Featured videos: Milli Vanilli – "Baby Don't Forget My Number"; Journey – "Separate Ways (Worlds Apart)"; Onyx featuring Biohazard – "Slam"; Eddie Money – "Shakin'"
45	16	"Citizen Butt-head"	Unknown	October 18, 1993
President Bill Clinton is about to visit Highland High, so McVicker does his best to keep Beavis and Butt-Head preoccupied by sending the boys off-campus. Featured videos: Tag Team – "Whoomp! (There It Is)"; Daisy Chainsaw – "Love Your Money"; Tool – "Sober"
46	17	"Citizen Butt-head, Part II"	Unknown	October 18, 1993
The duo still find their way back into the gymnasium where the President is giving an assembly. Featured videos: Rollins Band – "Low Self Opinion"; Suzanne Vega – "Blood Makes Noise"; The Georgia Satellites – "Keep Your Hands to Yourself"
47	18	"Politically Correct"	Joe Stillman	October 21, 1993
The duo accidentally run for student office and receive one vote. Featured videos: Yoko Ono – "My Man"; Metallica – "One"; The Beloved – "Sweet Harmony"
48	19	"Ball Breakers"	Kristofor Brown	October 25, 1993
The duo take to bowling as their latest activity. While there, they steal Mr. Anderson's bowling ball, put firecrackers in it and drop it from the roof of the building onto the street. Anderson is arrested for the 'bombing'.: This episode was blamed for a bowling ball-related incident in New Jersey.; Featured videos: Dread Zeppelin – "Heartbreaker"; Skatenigs – "Chemical Imbalance"; Skid Row – "Monkey Business"
49	20	"Meet God"	Joe Stillman	October 28, 1993
The two try to score chicks while hitchhiking, but unwittingly join a cult. Featured videos: Helloween – "Halloween"; The Dickies – "Killer Klowns"; The Sisters of Mercy – "Doctor Jeep"; Electric Sun – "The Night the Master Comes"; Prong – "Prove You Wrong"
50	21	"Meet God, Part II"	Joe Stillman	October 28, 1993
The duo end up at the cult of a man claiming to be God. Featured videos: Alice Cooper – "Welcome to My Nightmare"; Bauhaus – "Ziggy Stardust"; Madonna – "Fever"; Bananarama – "Venus"
51	22	"True Crime"	Don London	November 1, 1993
The duo arrive at a local bank, where they find that someone has left their bank card in the ATM. Beavis correctly guesses the card's pin code, and the duo pocket thousands of dollars from the person's account. The incident is captured on CCTV and ends up being shown on America's Most Hated (a spoof of America's Most Wanted). It is revealed that the bank card belongs to a professional basketball player, and the pin code guessed by Beavis was "balls". The police draft in an armed team (shown on TV as Coppers, a spoof of Cops) to hunt the duo down and reclaim the money. They raid the house while the boys are sitting on the couch surrounded by the cash, and arrest them.: This episode was never released on any home video.; Featured videos: Vanilla Ice – "Ice, Ice Baby"; Alice in Chains – "Man in the Box"; Grace Jones – "Demolition Man"; The Trash Can Sinatras – "Hay Fever"
52	23	"The Trial"	Guy Maxtone-Graham	November 4, 1993
After being locked up for egging Mr. Anderson's house, Beavis and Butt-Head face trial. However, they have no defense, except from Butt-Head, who momentarily trips up Mr. Anderson on the witness stand. This nearly gets them acquitted, but the district attorney notices Butt-Head said something that was not part of the police interviews or the trial testimony. Beavis and Butt-Head are convicted and sentenced to 500 hours of community service, during which they are meant to help other kids; instead they egg Mr. Anderson's house again with the kids they are meant to be keeping out of trouble. Featured videos: The Cult – "Lil' Devil"; George Michael – "Killer/Papa Was a Rollin' Stone"; Edie Brickell & New Bohemians – "What I Am"
53	24	"The Crush"	Jerry Lampini	November 8, 1993
The two attempt to join the gang of Todd, an aggressive delinquent they admire. They are made to ride together in the trunk of his car as an initiation test, but afterwards he rejects them. Featured videos: Rick James – "Superfreak"; Scandal – "Goodbye to You"; T'Pau – "Heart and Soul"; Biz Markie – "Just a Friend"; Joan Jett – "Do You Wanna Touch Me"; Depeche Mode – "I Feel You"
54	25	"Plate Frisbee"	David S. Cohen	November 11, 1993
Beavis and Butt-Head go to Stewart's house, where they pick up an antique plate belonging to Stewart's mother. They go outside and use it as a frisbee. Featured videos: Dolly Parton – "More Where That Came From"; King Missile – "Martin Scorsese"; Quicksand – "Dine Alone"; Chris Isaak – "Wicked Game"
55	26	"Canoe"	Geoff Whelan and Mike Judge	November 15, 1993
Mr. Van Driessen takes the duo and Stewart on a canoe trip. At their camp, Beavis and Butt-Head use poison ivy as toilet paper and a bear attacks Van Driessen.: Never released on any home video.; Featured videos: Frank Zappa – "You Are What You Is"; The Europeans – "The Animal Song"; Motörhead – "No Voices in the Sky"; The Replacements – "Bastards of Young"
56	27	"Young, Gifted, & Crude"	Jerry Lampini	November 25, 1993
The duo ace a placement test by filling out the multiple choice answers at random and are moved up to a gifted class. There, they accidentally cause damage to a student's brain and he is demoted to Beavis and Butt-Head's old class. Featured videos: Infectious Grooves – "Three Headed Mind Pollution"; Ethyl Meatplow – "Devil's Johnson"; Rockwell – "Somebody's Watching Me"
57	28	"Foreign Exchange"	Don London	December 9, 1993
The duo befriend a foreign exchange student from Japan. They make him as dumb as they are, which greatly disappoints his parents when he returns to Japan. Featured videos: Madness – "One Step Beyond"; Jordy – "Dur dur d'être bébé!"; Cypress Hill – "Insane in the Brain"; Art of Noise – "Close (To the Edit)"
CS1	29	"A Very Special Christmas with Beavis and Butt-Head"	Unknown	December 17, 1993
Extended episode. A Christmas-themed episode, featuring only music videos. Featured videos: Hall & Oates – "Jingle Bell Rock"; Leon Redbone with Dr. John – "Frosty the Snowman"; Bing Crosby with David Bowie – "The Little Drummer Boy"; Band Aid – "Do They Know It's Christmas?"; Tony Bennett – "White Christmas"; Elmo and Patsy – "Grandma Got Run Over by a Reindeer"; Billy Squier – "Christmas Is the Time to Say I Love You"; Hoodoo Gurus – "The Little Drummer Boy"; The California Raisins – "Rudolph the Red-Nosed Reindeer"; Run–D.M.C. – "Xmas in Hollis"; Bad News – "Cashing in on Christmas"; David Johansen – "Zat You Santa Claus?"; Max Headroom – "Merry Christmas Santa Claus"; Ramones – "Merry Christmas (I Don't Want to Fight Tonight)"
58	30	"Closing Time"	Kristofor Brown	December 23, 1993
Left in charge of Burger World after closing, Beavis and Butt-Head throw burgers across the restaurant. A health inspector arrives, and is disgusted by the state of it. The boys had fried up some nightcrawlers and give a batch to the inspector, who unwittingly enjoys them and orders the restaurant closed due to the violations. Featured videos: Björk – "Human Behavior"; Peter Gabriel – "Kiss That Frog"
59	31	"Most Wanted"	Guy Maxtone-Graham	March 5, 1994
Extended episode. Beavis and Butt-Head are watching television when a new bulletin warning of an escaped serial killer comes on. Later on, the duo meet the killer in their backyard and accidentally convince him to go back to prison so he can give his fellow inmates tattoos. Featured videos: PJ Harvey – "Man-Size"; The Flaming Lips – "She Don't Use Jelly"; Type O Negative – "Black No. 1 (Little Miss Scare-All)"; Love and Rockets – "No New Tale to Tell"; Billy Joel – "Uptown Girl"; Clutch – "A Shogun Named Marcus"; Tori Amos – "Crucify"; Candlebox – "Change"

=== Season 4 (1994) ===
No. overall	No. in season	Title	Original release date
60	1	"Wall of Youth"	March 14, 1994
Clark Cobb's latest community venture recruits Beavis and Butt-Head, who graffiti the names of rock bands on various pieces of artwork. The boys claim it is a tribute to the people who died in the Vietnam War. Featured videos: Bell Biv DeVoe – "Gangsta"; Death – "The Philosopher"; Vixen – "Edge of a Broken Heart"
61	2	"Cow Tipping"	March 15, 1994
Beavis and Butt-Head attempt cow tipping. Butt-Head pushes the cow onto Beavis, trapping him under it. A crazy farmer decides to slaughter the injured cow with a chainsaw, with Beavis still underneath. Featured videos: Men Without Hats – "The Safety Dance"; Fu-Schnickens with Shaquille O'Neal – "What's Up Doc? (Can We Rock)"; Violent Femmes – "Nightmares"
62	3	"Trouble Urinating"	March 17, 1994
Beavis and Butt-Head forget how to urinate, and it is up to Coach Buzzcut to re-teach them. He fails, so they are sent to a nurse who solves their problem. Featured videos: Michael Bolton – "How Am I Supposed to Live Without You"; The Reverend Horton Heat – "Wiggle Stick"; The Rolling Stones – "Emotional Rescue"; Slayer – "Seasons in the Abyss"
63	4	"Rabies Scare"	March 18, 1994
Beavis is bitten by a potentially rabid dog. When the bite becomes infected, he is treated by a mean doctor who has a cruel prescription to 'help' Beavis. Featured videos: Missing Persons – "Words"; Faith No More – "Easy"; Public Image Ltd – "The Body"; Biohazard and Onyx – "Judgment Night"
64	5	"They're Coming to Take Me Away, Huh Huh"	March 21, 1994
Beavis and Butt-Head see the school psychiatrist. She questions them and they are subsequently committed. Featured videos: The Smashing Pumpkins – "Today"; Salt-n-Pepa – "Shoop"; Gwar – "Jack the World"
65	6	"Jump!"	March 24, 1994
The duo visit to a bank to try to withdraw money, despite not having accounts. The police turn up to arrest the bank officer for embezzlement when he is talking to the boys, only to have him head to the roof and threaten suicide. The cops enlist Beavis and Butt-Head to get the banker to surrender, and they accidentally convince him to do just that. Featured videos: Ozzy Osbourne – "Shot in the Dark"; Lou Reed – "No Money Down"; Crowbar – "All I Had (I Gave)"
66	7	"Pumping Iron"	March 28, 1994
Beavis and Butt-Head go to a gym that is offering free trial memberships. Butt-Head repeatedly propels Beavis into a wall using the treadmill. Before this, they do a poor job of spotting a short-tempered weightlifter, who turns his anger on the duo. Featured videos: Midi, Maxi & Efti – "Bad Bad Boys"; Overkill – "Hello From The Gutter"; My Life with the Thrill Kill Kult – "Blue Buddha"; Lenny Kravitz – "Is There Any Love in Your Heart"
67	8	"Let's Clean it Up"	March 31, 1994
When Beavis and Butt-Head are sent to the nurse's office by Coach Buzzcut to fix their poor hygiene, they find that the young, attractive nurse is out to seduce them. They enjoy receiving a massage from her. They go back to the nurse's office, and are disappointed that the nurse is an ugly, fat, middle-aged woman and that the "nurse" they saw before was actually a teaching assistant who was suffering from concussion-induced delusions. Featured videos: Frank Sinatra with Bono – "I've Got You Under My Skin"; Doug E. Fresh – "I-ight (Alright)"; Melvins – "Hooch"
68	9	"1-900-BEAVIS"	April 4, 1994
The duo call a phone sex number and later try to set up their own service. Featured videos: Eve's Plum – "Blue"; Barry White – "Put Me in Your Mix"; Low Pop Suicide – "Kiss Your Lips"
69	10	"Water Safety"	April 7, 1994
Swimming lessons by Coach Buzzcut are put into jeopardy by the duo's ineptitude. Featured videos: Curve – "Missing Link"; Carnival Art – "Mr. Blue Veins"; R.E.M. – "Nightswimming"
70	11	"Blackout!"	April 11, 1994
Highland is stricken by a blackout and Beavis and Butt-Head try to find a working TV while causing a lot of damage along the way. Featured videos: Radiohead – "Creep"; Morrissey – "November Spawned a Monster"
71	12	"Late Night with Butt-head"	April 14, 1994
Butt-head is inspired by David Letterman and gets a shot at hosting his own talk show on the high school's TV channel. Featured videos: Grim Reaper – "See You In Hell"; Donny Osmond – "Sacred Emotion"; Greta – "Fathom"
72	13	"The Final Judgement of Beavis"	April 18, 1994
Beavis runs into a wall, thinking that he can charge through it. He knocks himself out and dreams that he meets St. Peter in Heaven, who is none too pleased with Beavis' past behavior while living on Earth. St. Peter refuses him entry to Heaven, sending him to Hell instead. Butt-Head wakes Beavis by throwing a bucket of water over him. Featured videos: Gary Numan – "Cars"; Frank Black – "Los Angeles"; Tom Waits – "I Don't Wanna Grow Up"
73	14	"Pool Toys"	April 21, 1994
Mr. Anderson hires Beavis and Butt-Head again, this time to help him build an in-ground swimming pool. Anderson's plans go awry when he cannot find the tiles he needs and is left behind in the store after it closes as his car is towed away. Meanwhile, the boys put many gallons of water, six bags of cement, a bulldozer, a shed and themselves into the hole where they are meant to be building the pool—trapping themselves in there. Featured videos: Sagat – "Why Is It? (Funk Dat)"; Ēbn-Ōzn – "AEIOU Sometimes Y"; Anthrax – "Hy Pro Glo"
74	15	"Madame Blavatsky"	April 25, 1994
The duo visit a psychic, who uses cold reading techniques to deduce that they are high school students who are not 'A' students. She tells Butt-Head that he will become important, rich and famous—and that he will get beautiful women, a mansion, servant and a yacht. Beavis looks into her crystal ball and sees visions of a major war (which is just reflections of the TV behind him, showing an actual warzone). Featured videos: Metallica – "For Whom the Bell Tolls"; Nina Hagen – "Herrmann hieß er"; Donald Fagen and Walter Becker – "Snowbound"
75	16	"Beavis and Butt-Head's Island"	April 28, 1994
The duo go to a dress shop in a shopping mall, to "check out chicks". After being told to leave the store, they walk into an artificial lake in the mall when it is dry in order to take coins that people have thrown into it when making wishes. The janitor turns on the water, so they climb onto the lake's island. They spend three days there, thinking they are trapped on the island, until the janitor tells them that they can walk through the shallow water. The boys walk out of the lake, then take a mannequin with a dress on it home with them. Featured videos: Whale – "Hobo Humpin' Slobo Babe"; The Cure – "The Caterpillar"; Beck – "Pay No Mind (Snoozer)"
76	17	"Figure Drawing"	May 2, 1994
The two enjoy a figure drawing class that features a nude female model, less for the art work than for the reactions she inspires in them. They are less enthusiastic about the male model who arrives for the second part of the class. Featured videos: Nine Inch Nails – "March of the Pigs"; George Thorogood and the Destroyers – "Bad to the Bone"; later airings had Dick Dale – "Nitro" in place of this; Superchunk – "Package Thief"
77	18	"Date Bait"	May 5, 1994
Beavis and Butt-Head go to a movie theater. Outside, they are scammed by two girls who tell them they will be their dates if the boys give them their tickets and that the girls will let them in through the exit doors. Featured videos: Bryan Adams, Rod Stewart, and Sting – "All for Love"; Primus – "DMV"; Morbid Angel – "God of Emptiness"; Green Apple Quick Step – "Dirty Water Ocean"
78	19	"Butt Is It Art?"	May 9, 1994
Beavis and Butt-Head go on a school trip to an art museum, where the duo vandalize two paintings. Featured videos: Nirvana – "Heart-Shaped Box"; Candyland – "Bitter Moon"; Matthew Sweet – "Superdeformed"
79	20	"Right On"	May 12, 1994
Beavis and Butt-Head appear on The Gus Baker Show and ruin both the show and ultra-conservative Gus' grassroots presidential campaign in the process. The show is pulled off the air after the duo use coarse slang and Beavis moons the audience. Featured videos: Jawbox – "Savory"; The Clash – "Should I Stay or Should I Go"; Herb Alpert – "North on South St."
80	21	"Manners Suck"	May 21, 1994
A guest teacher, Mr. Manners, attempts to teach manners to Mr. Van Driessen's class. Beavis and Butt-Head makes it difficult for him due to their crude nature. This leads to Mr. Manners grabbing the duo, and a physical fight between him and Van Driessen ensues. Featured videos: Green Day – "Longview"; Prong – "Snap Your Fingers, Snap Your Neck"; Styx – "Too Much Time on My Hands"
81	22	"The Pipe of Doom"	May 21, 1994
The duo go to a construction site, where Butt-head climbs into a pipe and gets stuck inside.: En Vogue with Salt-n-Pepa – "Whatta Man"; Mark O'Connor – "The Devil Comes Back to Georgia"; Pantera – "I'm Broken"
82	23	"Safe Driving"	July 11, 1994
Beavis and Butt-Head's class are shown a state highway patrol film by Coach Buzzcut to prepare them for driving lessons. Featured videos: Shonen Knife – "Tomato Head"; Alice Cooper – "Lost in America"; Johnny Cash – "Delia's Gone"
83	24	"Mr. Anderson's Balls"	July 11, 1994
The duo look for a missing kid in order to receive reward money. While walking in a shallow creek, a golf ball hits Beavis. They realize they are at a golf course, where they steal golf balls that Mr. Anderson is using—then sell them back to him. Featured videos: Primal Scream – "Rocks"; Sonic Youth – "Bull in the Heather"; KMFDM – "A Drug Against War"
84	25	"Patients Patients"	July 12, 1994
Beavis and Butt-Head go to the optometrist and dentist, respectively. After they anger their doctors, Butt-Head's mouth is wired shut, and Beavis is given glasses that make his eyesight worse. Featured videos: DJ Jazzy Jeff & The Fresh Prince – "I Wanna Rock"; Kate Bush – "Love and Anger"
85	26	"Teen Talk"	July 12, 1994
Beavis and Butt-Head are forced to go on a TV talk show for teenage delinquents as punishment for vandalizing a display for an unveiling ceremony. Featured videos: Cheap Trick – "Woke Up with a Monster"; Meshell Ndegeocello – "If That's Your Boyfriend (He Wasn't Last Night)"; George Thorogood and the Destroyers – "Bad to the Bone"
86	27	"Crisis Line"	July 13, 1994
Beavis and Butt-Head volunteer to run a teen crisis line so that they can "score".: Danzig – "Mother '93"; James – "Say Something"; Mutha's Day Out – "Locked"
87	28	"Beavis and Butt-Head vs. the Vending Machine"	July 13, 1994
The duo attempt to buy pork rinds from a vending machine outside a convenience store, but the machine malfunctions. Featured videos: Sweaty Nipples – "Demon Juice"; Elton John and RuPaul – "Don't Go Breaking My Heart"; Seaweed – "Kid Candy"; Mötley Crüe – "Hooligan's Holiday"
88	29	"Generation in Crisis"	July 14, 1994
A graduate student in film and anthropology visits the school to make a documentary about problem teenagers. He makes Beavis and Butt-Head the focus of his film. Featured videos: Ramones – "Substitute"; Blur – "Chemical World"; Morphine – "Thursday"
89	30	"Radio Sweethearts"	July 14, 1994
Beavis and Butt-Head become guest radio DJs on a rock music station but run afoul of the host when they begin mocking him. Featured videos: Sonic Youth – "Dirty Boots"; Soundgarden – "Spoonman"; Greta – "Is It What You Wanted"
90	31	"The Great Cornholio"	July 15, 1994
The duo go to Stewart's house, where Beavis eats a huge amount of sugary food that he finds in the cupboard. The duo go to school, where Beavis turns into a hyper-intense, hyperactive Hispanic called "Cornholio" who walks around the school repeatedly saying that he needs "T.P. for his bunghole". Featured videos: Sausage – "Riddles Are Abound Tonight"; Danger Danger – "Naughty Naughty"; Devo – "Whip It"; Note: This episode was the first time Beavis transforms into Cornholio, which would be one of the show's running gags in some latter episodes in the series.
91	32	"Liar! Liar!"	July 15, 1994
The Burger World manager makes the two take a polygraph test after their cash register comes up short. Featured videos: Maggie Estep – "Hey Baby"; Rollins Band – "Liar"; Helium – "XXX"

=== Season 5 (1994–95) ===
No. overall	No. in season	Title	Original release date
92	1	"Held Back"	October 31, 1994
Due to their stupidity, Beavis and Butt-Head are progressively demoted from their original class down to kindergarten, where they wreak havoc. Featured videos: Soundgarden – "Black Hole Sun"; Violent Femmes – "Breakin' Up"; The Dylans – "Grudge"
93	2	"Killing Time"	October 31, 1994
The duo try to find things to do when there is nothing they want to watch on TV. Featured videos: Rick Derringer – "Real American"; The Fabulous Thunderbirds – "Wrap It Up"; Sam Harris – "Somewhere Over the Rainbow"; Napalm Death – "Plague Rages"
94	3	"Beard Boys"	November 1, 1994
Beavis and Butt-Head want beards so that chicks will find them manly and cool. Featured videos: Ratt – "I Want a Woman"; Stakka Bo – "Here We Go (Stakka Bo song)"; Sugartooth – "Sold My Fortune"
95	4	"Choke"	November 2, 1994
Butt-Head, then later Beavis, end up choking on a piece of chicken while watching TV. Featured videos: Didjits – "Judge Hot Fudge"; Lita Ford with Ozzy Osbourne – "Close My Eyes Forever"; De La Soul – "Ego Trippin' (Part Two)"
96	5	"Safe House"	November 3, 1994
Todd is on the run from some rival gang members, as well as the police, so he uses Beavis and Butt-Head's house as a hideout. Featured videos: Crowbar – "Existence Is Punishment"; Brian Setzer – "Rebelene"; Pia Zadora – "Rock It Out"
97	6	"Hard Sell"	November 4, 1994
The duo start jobs as telemarketers at a call center. Featured videos: Stone Temple Pilots – "Vasoline"; Archers of Loaf – "Web in Front"; Stacey Q – "Two of Hearts"; Infectious Grooves – "Violent and Funky"
98	7	"Walkathon"	December 10, 1994
For a 10-mile charity walkathon, the duo unwittingly pledge $10 each per mile to Daria. She pledges them a nickel between them per mile. After they finish, they are asked for the $100 apiece that they owe. They do not have it, so are told to 'walk it off' at a rate of 5c per mile. Featured videos: Mojo Nixon and Skid Roper – "Elvis Is Everywhere"; The Grays – "Very Best Years"; Tori Amos – "God"; Godspeed – "Houston St."
99	8	"Temporary Insanity"	December 10, 1994
The duo get off the school bus part-way through their journey to school, after Butt-Head falsely claims to the driver that they have an emergency. They walk into a real estate office and are wrongly assumed to be temps. Butt-Head photocopies his buttocks and Beavis types in a manic and random way. The two actual temps arrive, and Beavis and Butt-Head tell them to take a seat. The computer that Beavis is using overheats and he throws water over it. Beavis and Butt-Head are told to come back to work the next day. Featured videos: David Byrne – "Angels"; Coverdale and Page – "Pride and Joy"; Iggy Pop – "Butt Town"; LaTour – "People Are Still Having Sex"
100	9	"Dude, a Reward"	December 10, 1994
Beavis finds cameras in bag in a bush. He and Butt-Head take several close-up pictures of themselves, before Beavis repeatedly smashes one of them into the ground. Butt-Head finds a card in the bag which gives the name and address of the photographer who is the owner. They go to his studio to receive a reward. The photographs that the duo took are exhibited. Featured videos: R.E.M. – "Shiny Happy People"; Rick Dees – "Get Nekked"; Dandelion – "Under My Skin"; Entombed – "Wolverine Blues"
101	10	"Walking Erect"	December 13, 1994
Beavis and Butt-Head go to the zoo. They find the guide boring, so they go to the snake house. They spark a panic that a snake has escaped. The lights go out and they wake up with their hands around each other's penises, each wrongly having believed that they were holding a snake. Featured videos: Alice in Chains – "I Stay Away"; Pride & Glory – "Losin' Your Mind"; The B.C. 52s – "(Meet) The Flintstones"
102	11	"Career Day"	December 16, 1994
The duo do a day's work experience as security guards at the mall. They are led by the mall's sleazy security guard, who wants to do a full cavity search on a young woman. Featured videos: Slaughter – "Real Love"; The Meices – "Daddy's Gone to California"; Tool – "Prison Sex"; Pavement – "Cut Your Hair"
103	12	"Plastic Surgin'"	December 19, 1994
The duo watch a television advertisement for breast enlargement. They decide to go to a plastic surgeon to have their penises enlarged. When they are there, a misunderstanding means that they have their noses enlarged instead. Featured videos: Pantera – "This Love"; The Artist Formerly Known as Prince – "The Most Beautiful Girl in the World"; Rush – "Stick It Out"; Sheena Easton – "Sugar Walls"
104	13	"Take a Number"	December 22, 1994
The duo go to a rock concert. Outside, they meet two girls who are like female versions of them, but cannot close the deal because they do not have concert tickets. They meet a scalper, but cannot afford the tickets. They stand in line for the portable toilet, but because it is very long, they urinate behind a dumpster, for which they are reprimanded by a security guard. When they finally reach the toilet, Beavis goes in it and Butt-Head tips it onto its side. Featured videos: Life of Agony – "This Time"; Iron Maiden – "From Here to Eternity"; David Cassidy – "Lyin' to Myself"; Godley & Creme – "Cry"
105	14	"Beaverly Buttbillies"	December 26, 1994
The duo decide to dig for oil in their yard, but instead break a sewerage pipe, causing blackwater to gush out of the pipe onto them and the garden. Wrongly assuming it to be oil, they fill their trash can with human waste and try to sell it to Mr. Anderson. He tells them to get the barrel of crap the hell out of here; he slams his front door, tipping the waste onto his front path. Two workmen from the waste department arrive in a van and tell Beavis and Butt-Head that they have fixed the leak, before driving off. Featured videos: Dog Eat Dog – "No Fronts"; The Bubblemen – "The Bubblemen Are Coming"; Girlschool – "Play Dirty"; Babes in Toyland – "Ripe"
106	15	"Tainted Meat"	December 29, 1994
While the duo are at Burger World, Beavis' genitals itch a lot, so he scratches them, then cooks a burger. This causes a food poisoning outbreak, which hospitalizes many of the restaurant's customers. The restaurant is closed down and the duo are fired. When it re-opens, they are re-hired; a notice mandates that employees must wash their hands before handling meat. Featured videos: that dog. – "Old Timer"; Revolting Cocks – "Crackin' Up"; MC 900 Ft. Jesus – "If I Only Had a Brain"
107	16	"Stewart Moves Away"	January 5, 1995
The duo enter Stewart's house by opening a window and climbing in. They find the house empty, and watch TV. Two burglars break the door down and claim to be moving men. The burglars steal some things and deliberately break some other things, before leaving in a van. Beavis and Butt-Head deliberately cause a great deal of damage to the house and its contents. Stewart and his parents arrive home and are horrified by the damage, but Stewart's dad instead berates Stewart to cover up his wife finding his porn magazines. The duo walk away without any consequences. Featured videos: Gwar – "Saddam a Go-Go"; Bobby McFerrin – "Don't Worry, Be Happy"; Dinosaur Jr. – "Feel the Pain"
108	17	"Top o' the Mountain"	January 19, 1995
The duo go to a hair salon in order to have haircuts so that they can get physically close to an attractive hairdresser's breasts. They are unaware that she is Todd's girlfriend. She washes their hair, then Todd arrives. He gives Beavis and Butt-Head very bad haircuts, cutting off the vast majority of their hair. Featured videos: Skrew – "Picasso Trigger"; Comateens – "The Late Mistake"; Cannibal Corpse – "Staring Through the Eyes of the Dead"; Rollins Band – "Disconnect"
109	18	"Party"	January 29, 1995
Beavis and Butt-Head watch a TV report on a parties, so they attempt to throw a party as a way to get chicks. However, no girls turn up. Stewart and his two nerdy friends from a youth group arrive and talk amongst themselves about MacGyver and Knight Rider. Todd and a member of his gang arrive and throw all the boys out, in order to have their own party there. Todd's party causes a lot of damage to the house.: This episode aired during Super Bowl XXIX's halftime show on ABC.; Featured videos: Robert Palmer – "Simply Irresistible"; The Jesus Lizard – "Glamorous"; The Mighty Mighty Bosstones – "Detroit Rock City"; Marilyn Manson – "Get Your Gunn"
110	19	"Wet Behind the Rears"	January 29, 1995
During physical education, the duo are sitting on the sports field. A javelin impales Beavis' right hand to the ground. They try to avoid showering with the rest of the class, but Coach Buzzcut demands that they do. They are undressing when Principal McVicker sets the fire alarm off. Instead of showering, they are embarrassingly forced by Buzzcut to exit the school in just their underwear. All the other students are already outside, fully clothed. They, as well as Buzzcut and McVicker, laugh at Beavis and Butt-Head. Featured videos: Beastie Boys – "Sabotage"; U2 – "Numb"; Yes – "Owner of a Lonely Heart"; R.E.M. – "What's the Frequency, Kenneth?"
111	20	"Bad Dog"	February 9, 1995
The duo watch a television advertisement encouraging people to adopt a dog from a shelter. They decide to, so they go to a dog shelter. They select the most violent, out-of-control dog, who especially hates Beavis. On their way home, Beavis throws a stick for the dog. The dog runs past the stick and does not return. Featured videos: Moist – "Push"; Grim Reaper – "Rock You to Hell"; Nitzer Ebb – "Fun to Be Had"; Phish – "Down with Disease"
112	21	"Lightning Strikes"	February 16, 1995
Beavis and Butt-Head watch an episode of a television documentary called Great American Minds, which is about Benjamin Franklin. They see Franklin fly a kite with a key attached to it during a storm, so they do likewise. Their kite soon becomes stuck in a tree. The tree is struck by lightning, and falls on them. It is then struck again. The duo are admitted to the emergency department of a hospital. A representative of a media watchdog visits them in hospital, where she asks Butt-Head what he was watching on TV. She is interviewed on TV, where she says that the duo were watching rock music videos, and implies that was what encouraged them to fly the kite in a storm. Featured videos: Blur – "Parklife"; Biohazard – "Tales from the Hard Side"; Pizzicato Five – "Twiggy Twiggy"
113	22	"Dream On"	February 23, 1995
Beavis and Butt-Head fall asleep on the couch while The Today Show is on. The duo dream that they are on various TV shows. Featured videos: Tesla – "Call It What You Want"; Cheech & Chong – "I'm Not Home Right Now"; Supersuckers – "Creepy Jackalope Eye"; Björk – "Big Time Sensuality"
114	23	"Candy Sale"	April 8, 1995
Guest teacher Mr. Manners returns to Highland High, this time under the guise of Mr. Candy. He hands the students a hundred candy bars each to sell door-to-door for $2 each. Coach Buzzcut tells the class that they are competing against other classes. Beavis and Butt-Head together sell one each to Mr. Anderson for half-price. The duo then sell the rest to each other and eat them. Mr. Candy is angry with the duo for only having $2 in exchange for all their candy bars, and grabs them. Buzzcut angrily takes exception to someone else disciplining his students, and gets into a fight with Mr. Candy. Featured videos: Coolio featuring J-Ro and Billy Boy – "I Remember"; Shudder to Think – "Hit Liquor"; Varga – "Greed"
115	24	"Animation Sucks"	April 8, 1995
When Mr. Van Driessen challenges his class to make animated films. One student, Cassandra, creates a scene of a flower growing, blooming, then dying—which she is very pleased with (as it reminds Cassandra of her father). Beavis and Butt-Head draw 500 drawings of dead people, which create a scene in which two characters resembling themselves are repeatedly stabbed with tridents. One character is grabbed by a dog and the other has a plane crash into him. Van Driessen is pleased with both short films. Featured videos: Danzig – "Cantspeak"; Julee Cruise – "Rockin' Back Inside My Heart"; David Lee Roth – "She's My Machine"
116	25	"What's the Deal"	June 5, 1995
Mr. Anderson employs the duo to do some work in his garden, which they are doing badly. He thinks that he can win money from them by having them join a poker game which he is going to play with two other men. Beavis and Butt-Head do not know how to play the game, yet they win by luck alone. Anderson gives them plastic chips in exchange for the money that they won, which the duo think is a good deal. Featured videos: Exodus – "Thorn in My Side"; The Reverend Horton Heat – "Psychobilly Freakout"; Mercyful Fate – "The Bell Witch"; Poison – "I Want Action"
117	26	"The History of Women"	June 5, 1995
Mr. Van Driessen tells his class to each write an essay on the woman whom they admire most, for Women's History Month. Cassandra chooses k.d. lang. Beavis and Butt-Head initially both choose Beavis' mother. Van Driessen rejects their weak efforts, so the duo go to the school library. The librarian recommends books about various women—as they try to look up her skirt while she is on a stepladder. They tell Van Driessen that she is the woman whom they admire most. He is disappointed with them again, and makes them return books to the library's shelves. While there, they put the books in random places, much to the annoyance of the librarian, who corrects them. They take the opportunity to look up her skirt again and "see the beauty." Featured videos: 7 Year Bitch – "Hip Like Junk"; Grim Reaper – "Fear No Evil"; 2 Unlimited – "Get Ready for This"
118	27	"To the Rescue"	June 6, 1995
Beavis and Butt-Head are sitting in a field, when a light aircraft crashes nearby. They go to the nearby road and stop a car, whose driver calls the police and an ambulance. The pilot is airlifted to hospital, where he makes a full recovery. The story is re-enacted in Rescue 911. Featured videos: Deus – "Suds & Soda"; The Cramps – "Ultra Twist!": The boys think the episode is based on Tales from the Crypt.; Slayer – "Serenity in Murder"
119	28	"I Dream of Beavis"	June 7, 1995
The duo watch I Dream of Jeannie, then rummage through a dumpster. Beavis finds a bottle containing a dead mouse, expecting it will grant him wishes. He brings it to school, where the classroom is evacuated because of its smell. Due to this and the fact that none of his wishes were answered, Beavis leaves the bottle in the school cafeteria. Featured videos: Snoop Dogg – "Gin and Juice"; Julie Brown – "Girl Fight Tonight!"; Nudeswirl – "Buffalo"
120	29	"Pregnant Pause"	June 8, 1995
Beavis fears that he is pregnant, due to having some of the symptoms and not realising that males cannot be impregnated. He uses a pregnancy test, and believes that it turning yellow when he urinates on it indicates a positive result. After defecating, he realizes that he is not pregnant. Featured videos: Helmet – "Wilma's Rainbow"; Yanni – "Reflections of Passion"; Dinosaur Jr. – "I Don't Think So"
121	30	"Here Comes the Bride's Butt"	June 9, 1995
The duo attend a local church wedding, uninvited, in the belief that the attendees get to make out with the bride. Butt-Head objects to the wedding on the grounds that the groom is a dork. The duo try to kiss the bride, and are ejected by the ushers. Outside the church, Butt-Head says that being married would suck, due to spending your life with the same person. Featured videos: Prince – "When 2 R In Love"; The Go-Go's – "The Whole World Lost Its Head"; Weezer – "Buddy Holly"
122	31	"Screamers"	July 10, 1995
Beavis and Butt-Head watch a horror film featuring screaming, the duo scream in the street, then knock on Mr. Anderson's door and scream at him when he answers. When they scream at a policeman in the street, he grabs them and screams at them. The duo go home and phone Stewart and scream at him. They then phone the police and scream at them. Featured videos: Quicksand – "Delusional"; Soul Coughing – "Down to This"; Van Halen – "Can't Stop Lovin' You"
123	32	"Beavis, Can You Spare a Dime?"	July 10, 1995
Beavis and Butt-Head encounter a beggar (voiced by Bobcat Goldthwait) in the street, and attempt to become beggars themselves. A policeman move the duo along and they beg with the beggar. They are much more successful as a trio. After a passer-by wrongly assumes that they are his sons, he pretends that they are. Featured videos: Letters to Cleo – "Here & Now"; Cheech & Chong – "Get Out of My Room"; Pop Will Eat Itself – "Ich Bin Ein Auslander"
124	33	"Skin Trade"	July 11, 1995
The duo are at a landfill site, where Beavis picks up a rotting animal carcass. He wants them to keep it as a pet, but Butt-Head points out that he cannot do so because it is dead. Butt-Head thinks it a good idea to attempt to sell the animal for its fur. The shops they attempt to sell it to refuse to buy it. They fail in their attempt to pick up two girls while Beavis has the carcass on his head. Featured videos: Hazel – "Comet"; Gary Young – "Plantman"; Carcass – "Heartwork"
125	34	"Oil Change"	July 12, 1995
The manager at Burger World tells Beavis and Butt-Head that customers have complained about their fries. He looks at the fryer, which is badly polluted and contains a grasshopper and a Band-Aid. He orders the duo to change the oil. They buy motor oil from an automobile repair shop on credit, and use that as the replacement oil. Featured videos: Live – "I Alone"; Ween – "I Can't Put My Finger on It"; Rancid – "Nihilism"
126	35	"Buttniks"	July 13, 1995
The duo visit a beatnik poetry night at a café. Butt-Head's poetry is not popular, and his performance is cut short. After drinking cappuccinos, Beavis' alter ego, Cornholio, resurfaces and he takes to the stage with manic ramblings which are well-received. Featured videos: Deconstruction – "L.A. Song"; The Stranglers – "Skin Deep"; Jon Spencer Blues Explosion – "Dang"
127	36	"Bang the Drum Slowly Dumbass"	August 7, 1995
Beavis and Butt-Head are walking through the woods, when they encounter a men's group headed by Mr. Van Driessen. They invite the duo to join them in a drum-beating session, which they do. Beavis bangs the drum while manically expressing his frustration at being always rejected by girls. The group at first respond well to him, but when Beavis says that he wants to bulldoze the school, Van Driessen's three followers leave, which Van Driessen is disappointed with. At school the next day, Van Driessen asks Butt-Head asks where Beavis is. Beavis is still in the woods, talking and banging the drum. Featured videos: Jill Sobule – "I Kissed a Girl"; Pavement – "Rattled by the Rush"; Sugar Ray – "Mean Machine"
128	37	"Another Friday Night"	August 7, 1995
The duo go to Maxi-Mart, where the store owner complains to them that they come there every Friday night, stand there for six hours, scare off his customers and only ever buy a soda. He goes into the back room to get dimes for the cash register. Butt-Head decides to serve two girls who are at the counter. From the back room, the owner sees Butt-Head at the register, and phones the police, telling that he is being robbed and assumes that they are armed. The police arrive outside and a standoff ensues. The police ask Butt-Head what his demands are, and he asks for food. The owner tells Beavis and Butt-Head that he has a gun and will use it on them if they come there again, then pushes them outside. The police search them for weapons and do not find any. The duo tell them about the owner's threat. The police enter, arrest the owner and beat him. Featured videos: Janet Jackson featuring MC Lyte – "You Want This"; Wax – "California"
129	38	"Tired"	August 8, 1995
The duo find a truck tire at a filling station. They push it up a steep hill, Beavis climbs in it, and Butt-Head pushes it down with Beavis in it. It crosses a busy highway, causing Todd to spill beer on his jeans while driving and other cars to crash into each other. It then crosses a field, where it flattens Mr. Van Driessen and his camera. It bounces on a car which is on bricks, dislodging it and crushing the person under the car. The tire then hits a lever next to railroad tracks, causing a train to derail. The tire is stopped due to colliding with the back of a minivan in a parking lot. Beavis then climbs out of it. He is joined by Butt-Head, then confronted by Todd, who beats Beavis up. Featured videos: Dink – "Green Mind"; Blues Traveler – "Run-Around"; Compulsion – "Delivery"
130	39	"Close Encounters"	August 9, 1995
Principal McVicker tries an unorthodox approach to discipline Beavis and Butt-Head, sending them to a sensitivity encounter group therapy session. The leader tells them that he will get them in touch with his feelings. He gives Beavis a bat and pillow and tells him to pretend the pillow is Butt-Head and let his anger flow. Beavis repeatedly beats the pillow, breaking it open while screaming "Die!" The duo go back to McVicker's office, where they tell him they are going to express their feelings. The duo then use McVicker's plant as a toilet. Featured videos: The Rolling Stones – "Love Is Strong"; The Black Crowes – "High Head Blues"; Faith No More – "Digging the Grave"
131	40	"Womyn"	August 10, 1995
On her last day teaching them, a feminist teaching assistant expresses her anger at how sexist Beavis and Butt-Head's class is. She invites the female students to go to a local meeting of a feminist group, where they will discuss their plans to picket the movie theater because it shows films featuring actresses who have breast augmentation. The duo decide to go to the meeting, thinking that they can score with some of the attendees. The group are hostile to them, and beat them up. Featured videos: Madonna – "Secret"; The Jesus and Mary Chain – "Come On"; Catherine Wheel – "Waydown"
132	41	"Premature Evacuation"	September 11, 1995
A phone call is made to the school by a man claiming that a bomb was placed in the school cafeteria the previous night. All of Highland High's staff and students are told by Principal McVicker over the school's public address system to evacuate the school. Beavis and Butt-Head stay at school and go to the cafeteria to search for the bomb. Beavis finds a cooking timer, and wrongly assumes that it is a bomb. He and Beavis fight over it, until a man from the bomb squad tells them what it is. No bomb is found. Featured videos: Sick of It All – "Step Down"; Sir Mix-a-Lot – "Ride"; Monster Magnet – "Negasonic Teenage Warhead"
133	42	"Whiplash"	September 11, 1995
The duo watch a television advertisement in which an attorney, Joe Adler, encourages people to claim compensation for their injuries. In an attempt to win compensation for a staged injury, Butt-Head obstructs the road by sitting in the road on his bicycle while Beavis is a passenger on the school bus. The bus driver brakes suddenly; the bus crashes into Butt-Head and causes Beavis to be thrown to the front of the bus. The duo go to Adler's office to ask him to get them compensation. Adler tells the duo that they are going to sue the school system, the city, the state and the driver. The police arrest Adler for 257 counts of fraud. One officer grabs and interrogates the duo. Featured videos: Radiohead – "Fake Plastic Trees"; Jerry Lee Lewis – "Goosebumps"; Korn – "Blind"
134	43	"Spare Me"	September 12, 1995
Two attractive girls whose car has a flat tire ask the duo to change the wheel for the one in their trunk, saying that they will take them for a ride. Daria is walking past and helps them do so. The boys think that they will score with the girls, but they drive off without them. The duo encounter the same girls and car further up the road, their engine having overheated. The girls again ask them to fix the car, using the same ruse. Featured videos: PJ Harvey – "Down by the Water"; Elastica – "Connection"; Goo Goo Dolls – "Only One"
135	44	"Patsies"	September 13, 1995
During detention with Coach Buzzcut, he orders the duo to join Mr. Graham and his group "Positive-Acting Teens". PAT take the duo to do community service together, picking up litter by the side of the road. The duo throw a hubcap to each other across the road. It hits a passing truck and rebounds against Mr. Graham's head. Butt-Head steals his wallet. Featured videos: Cinderella – "Somebody Save Me"; Fatima Mansions – "The Loyaliser"; Jennifer Trynin – "Happier"
136	45	"Murder Site"	September 14, 1995
The duo are watching Baywatch, when the show is interrupted by a news bulletin about a fratricide in a nearby apartment. They walk to the scene of the murder, past a police officer and through the police tape. In the room where the murder occurred, Butt-Head repeatedly calls him "buttknocker", and they fight. The police enter the room and arrest Beavis. At the police station, Butt-Head refuses to fill in a form about Beavis threatening to kill him, which would be needed to press charges. The police therefore release Beavis. Featured videos: Hole – "Violet"; John Fogerty – "Old Man Down the Road"; The Goops – "Booze Cabana"
137	46	"Spanish Fly"	October 9, 1995
The duo are at a gas station, where Beavis blows air from the air hose up an attractive young woman's dress and is disappointed that it did not lead to him having sex with her. Butt-Head buys Spanish fly from the station's restroom and they try to use it to score with girls in the school cafeteria. Beavis distracts a girl while Butt-Head puts Spanish fly in her taco. She does not notice, but loses her appetite and throws the taco in the garbage can. The duo try the same trick with a milk carton which is next to another girl. They are disappointed when she tells them that it is not hers. It belongs to a tall muscular boy, Tommy, who drinks it. When Tommy gets an erection while wrestling Beavis in the school gym, Beavis kicks him in the groin and leaves the gym. Featured videos: Green Day – "Basket Case"; Chris Isaak – "Somebody's Crying"; Helium – "Pat's Trick"
138	47	"Sexual Harassment"	October 9, 1995
Beavis and Butt-Head's class are taught about sexual harassment by Mr. Van Driessen. The duo claim that a female classmate, Kimberley, is sexually harassing them by giving them erections. They hire Joe Adler to sue her. He tries to also sue her parents, Van Driessen and the school system, for sexual harassment. The judge stops the case and throws it out for being ridiculous. Featured videos: Tom Petty – "It's Good to Be King"; The Prodigy – "Poison"; Morphine – "Honey White"
139	48	"Bus Trip"	October 10, 1995
Mr. Van Driessen leads the duo on a field trip in a school bus. Van Driessen moves them to the front of the bus after they were caught moon against the window. When the driver brakes suddenly while on a winding mountain road, Van Driessen is thrown through the windshield and down a steep cliff. He is airlifted on a stretcher by helicopter. Featured videos: The Flaming Lips – "Turn It On"; The Rake's Progress – "I'll Talk My Way Out of This One"; Ween – "Freedom of '76"
140	49	"Green Thumbs"	October 11, 1995
Beavis and Butt-Head make counterfeit money using a photocopier. They try to use it to pay for food at the Maxi Mart. The man behind the counter can see that it is fake, so he rips it up and ejects the duo. Featured videos: Our Lady Peace – "Starseed"; Michael Bolton – "Everybody's Crazy"; Beastie Boys – "Pass the Mic"
141	50	"Steamroller"	October 12, 1995
Mr. Anderson rents a steamroller, which he leaves running while unattended. Beavis and Butt-Head take a destructive ride on it along a street and into school. Featured videos: Björk – "Army of Me"; Skee-Lo – "I Wish"; Wilco – "Box Full of Letters"

=== Season 6 (1995–96) ===
No. overall	No. in season	Title	Original release date
HW1	1	"Bungholio: Lord of the Harvest"	October 31, 1995
Extended episode; Halloween Special: The duo attempt trick-or-treating. They are unsuccessful due to being too old and not wearing costumes. They knock on Mr. Anderson's front door, then sneak in when he is distracted by taking a phone call. Beavis devours his bowl of candy, then turns into Cornholio. Todd puts Butt-Head in the trunk of his car; Todd lets him out in a field and drives off. Beavis walks into a field and encounters a farmer who hangs Beavis on a hook attached to the inside of his barn. Beavis awakens on the hook. The farmer and Butt-Head open the barn doors and approach him. They each pick up a chainsaw, turn it on and move closer to him. Featured videos: Alice Cooper – "Teenage Frankenstein"; Paul Broucek – "Hollywood Halloween"; King Diamond – "The Family Ghost"
142	2	"The Mystery of Morning Wood"	November 20, 1995
Mr. Van Driessen sets the class a weekend assignment to solve something that is a mystery to them. Beavis and Butt-Head attempt to learn why they get erections in the morning, but do not work out the cause. Featured videos: Juliana Hatfield – "What a Life"; Railroad Jerk – "Rollerkoaster"; Silverchair – "Tomorrow"
143	3	"U.S. History"	November 20, 1995
Mr. Van Driessen's class have to each give an oral report about a historical American figure to the rest of the class. Daria presents a conspiracy theory of the assassination of John F. Kennedy. Beavis does his oral report about a meal he and Butt-Head ate last week at Burger World, which Van Driessen says is the worst he has heard. Butt-Head does his report on the time that he kicked Beavis in the testicles, which Van Driessen is very disappointed with. He gives them each a D− because they made "very weak" efforts. Featured videos: Grant Lee Buffalo – "Mockingbirds"; Dr. Dre – "Keep Their Heads Ringing"; Blind Melon – "Galaxie"
144	4	"Feel a Cop"	November 21, 1995
The duo watch a television news report about female police officers posing as street prostitutes in Highland. They fail to understand the report and approach an undercover cop, who leads the duo to her motel room which is being used to trap prospective clients, as her two colleagues listen and record the conversation from another room in the building. She becomes frustrated at the duo's use of vague slang, and a colleague of hers walks in and stops her from entrapping them. They both note as they leave that they were about to pay money for sex. Featured videos: Rednex – "Cotton Eye Joe"; Tom Jones – "If I Only Knew"; The The – "I Saw the Light"
145	5	"Date Watchers"	November 22, 1995
The duo see Mr. Van Driessen on a date with a young woman at a cafe. They follow the couple to his house and watch them through his window. The duo are disappointed when he pulls down the shade, so they ring his doorbell and tell him that they want to watch them doing it. The duo push their way into the house. Van Driessen drives her back to her place in his van. Featured videos: Coolio – "Gangsta's Paradise"; Foo Fighters – "I'll Stick Around"; Filter – "Hey Man, Nice Shot"
146	6	"Blood Pressure"	November 23, 1995
The duo go to a supermarket, where they see a blood pressure testing machine, and assume that it is a ride. Beavis puts his right arm in it and it clamps itself so tightly that he cannot remove it. Butt-Head fails in his attempts to free him. A pharmacist frees Beavis, then gives him a bottle of medication for his hypertension. When Beavis tries to open the bottle, he accidentally kicks it into a storm drain. Featured videos: Toadies – "Possum Kingdom"; Ned's Atomic Dustbin – "All I Ask of Myself Is That I Hold Together"; Die Cheerleader – "Pigskin Parade"
CS2a	7	"Huh-Huh-Humbug"	December 19, 1995
Part one of two. Beavis annoys his manager at Burger World by cooking a mouse on the grill. Beavis has a dream in which he is the Scrooge-like manager there and Principal McVicker is one of his employees. Beavis is visited by Butt-head, the Ghosts of Christmas Past, Present and Future – (presumably) Marley, Mr. Anderson, Mr. Van Driessen and Coach Buzzcut respectively – while trying to watch a porno on VHS. He briefly regrets this vision of his future but cheers up when he recounts it to Butt-head.
CS2b	8	"It's a Miserable Life"	December 19, 1995
Conclusion. In this parody of It's a Wonderful Life, the duo are visited by guardian angel Charlie after most of the town prays for their deaths. Charlie decides to show Butt-Head that everyone in Highland would have had a better life if he had not been born. In the version of Highland in which Butt-Head had not been born, Anderson's yard is in a much better condition, Burger World has more customers and Principal McVicker still has his hair, while Beavis and Stewart are volunteers at a homeless shelter. In the present, B&B refuse Charlie's "suggestions" that they kill themselves to improve the world, and Charlie falls into the icy river and drowns as they laugh.
147	9	"Babysitting"	January 14, 1996
Beavis and Butt-Head are hired to babysit a neighbor's two young children. They are useless at the job, and go to sleep in the children's beds. When the mother returns, she is horrified and ejects the duo without paying them. Featured videos: Annie Lennox – "No More I Love You's"; Vanilla Ice – "I Love You"; Tripping Daisy – "I Got a Girl"
148	10	"Vidiots"	January 14, 1996
Beavis and Butt-Head watch an episode of talk show Hiraldo, in which the topic is dating services. The duo go to a video dating service, where they are greeted by an attractive woman to whom Beavis gives his name as Hiraldo. She is attracted to Beavis, but he fails to recognize that. The duo receive calls from women on the phone and at the door, but they fail to understand that they are members of the dating service, and reject them. Featured videos: The Stone Roses – "Love Spreads"; Corrosion of Conformity – "Clean My Wounds"; Eleven – "Reach Out"
149	11	"Stewart is Missing"	January 15, 1996
Stewart's mother knocks on the door while the duo are watching TV to tell them that she does not know where he is. The duo help Stewart's parents find him. The duo open their closet to get their flashlight. There they find Stewart, whom they had shut in there hours earlier and forgotten about. Featured videos: Poison – "Unskinny Bop"; Circle Jerks – "I Wanna Destroy You"; Tricky – "Black Steel"
150	12	"Gang of Two"	January 16, 1996
Todd and a member of his gang grab and threaten the duo outside Maxi-Mart, after which they attempt to form their own gang. Stewart asks Beavis and Butt-Head to join their gang. They tell him that he has to break a milk crate in order to be admitted. While doing so at the back of the store, the owner catches him and drags him through the store to the front. The owner grabs Butt-Head and hits him, as Todd arrives and does the same to Beavis. Featured videos: CIV – "Can't Wait One Minute More"; The Murmurs – "You Suck"; Lordz of Brooklyn – "Saturday Night Fever"
151	13	"Sprout"	January 17, 1996
Mr. Van Driessen challenges his class to grow plants, so Beavis and Butt-Head attempt to grow some corn in order to make nachos. The duo become impatient with the plant's slow growth, and repeatedly stamp on it. Featured videos: Jellyfish – "The King is Half Undressed"; Bivouac – "Cynic"; Supergrass – "Caught by the Fuzz"
152	14	"Prank Call"	January 28, 1996
Beavis and Butt-Head receive a new phone book and decide to torment a man called Harry Sachz (pronounced "hairy sacks") with incessant prank calls. After a month of inane prank calls, Harry eventually tires of the duo and trains to gain their address over the phone. Beavis and Butt-Head accidentally send him to Stewart's house, where Harry breaks the front door down, walks in and grabs Stewart. He lets him go after seeing Mr. Stevenson, who walked into the room on the cordless phone. Harry holds Mr. Stevenson upside down, puts his head in the toilet and flushes it. He then inserts the Stevensons' phone into Mr. Stevenson's rectum. An ambulance takes Mr. Stevenson away. The duo later prank call Harry again. Featured videos: The Bucketheads – "The Bomb"; Bon Jovi – "Something for the Pain"; Del Amitri – "Roll to Me"
153	15	"No Service"	January 28, 1996
Burger World is very busy, so Beavis is called in to work. Butt-Head later arrives and attempts to ruin his day by being a difficult customer. Featured videos: Chris Knox – "Half Man, Half Mole"; Scatman John – "Scatman (Ski Ba Bop Ba Dop Bop)"; Chick – "Malibu"
154	16	"Yard Sale"	March 4, 1996
A friend of Mr. Anderson's phones him to ask him to man his bar for an hour while he takes his wife to the hospital. Beavis and Butt-Head are hired by Anderson to operate his yard sale, paying them in the form of a motorized hedge trimmer and 10% of the takings. Anderson is horrified when he walks into his house to see that the duo have sold virtually everything in his house for a small fraction of their value. Featured videos: Juliana Hatfield – "Universal Heart-Beat"; G. Love & Special Sauce – "Cold Beverage"; Shaggy – "Boombastic"
155	17	"P.T.A."	March 4, 1996
Beavis and Butt-Head attend a P.T.A. meeting hoping that they can get Mr. Van Driessen replaced with a "cool" teacher (whom they visualize as an older version of Butt-head who invites the students to engage in day drinking with him). The parents at the meeting misinterpret the duo's actions, which results in a brawl between Principal McVicker and several of the parents. Featured videos: Slash's Snakepit – "Beggars and Hangers-on"; Pink Floyd – "High Hopes"; Ted Nugent – "Heads Will Roll"
156	18	"Substitute"	March 5, 1996
Mr. Van Driessen sits on his desk in the lotus position. He falls to the floor and is injured. His temporary replacement, Jim, is easy-going and inspires most of the class to improve their academic performance—except for Beavis and Butt-Head. The duo repeatedly slam a locker door in the hall, causing cracks in the wall it shares with the classroom. When Van Driessen returns, the cracks worsen, and the blackboard shatters—falling on him. Featured videos: Extreme – "Hole Hearted"; Jamie Walters – "Hold On"; Chavez – "Break Up Your Band"
157	19	"Shopping List"	March 6, 1996
Beavis and Butt-Head are hired to shop by a constipated and injured Mr. Anderson. After doing the shopping, they take it home and forget to return to his house. Featured videos: Paula Abdul – "Crazy Cool"; Milla Jovovich – "The Gentlemen Who Fell"; Built to Spill – "In the Morning"
158	20	"Buy Beer"	March 7, 1996
Beavis and Butt-Head watch a television commercial for non-alcoholic beer. They buy some from Maxi-Mart, failing to understand what the drink is. They sit outside and drink it, expecting to get drunk. They are approached by a police officer who gives them a sobriety test, which they fail. He then sees that the beer is non-alcoholic, realizes they are stupid rather than drunk, and drives off. Featured videos: Hum – "Stars"; M.I.R.V. – "Shave My Face Off"; Mike Watt – "Piss Bottle Man"; Six Finger Satellite – "Parlour Games"

=== Season 7 (1997) ===
Starting this season, the show switched to a 7-minute short act, with most of the shorts running approximately 5 minutes with one music video at the end. All of the music videos this season are repeats from previous seasons, with the exception of "B&B Do Thanksgiving."

No. overall	No. in season	Title	Original release date
159	1	"Butt, Butt, Hike"	January 26, 1997
The duo are outside, fighting over the remote control, when they are invited to join a football game. The duo have no idea how to play, and Butt-Head is quickly injured. Beavis kicks two players, then takes the ball and runs with it way beyond the playing field. This episode aired on MTV during Super Bowl XXXI's halftime show on Fox. Featured videos: No videos shown in the premiere; PJ Harvey – "Down by the Water"
160	2	"Vaya Con Cornholio"	January 26, 1997
Beavis turns into Cornholio due to drinking a large amount of Burger World's new caffeine-laden drink "Volt Cola" (a parody of Jolt Cola). A man from the immigration department arrives and mistakes him for an illegal immigrant and Beavis is deported to Mexico. Featured videos: No videos shown in the premiere; Blues Traveler – "Run-Around"
161	3	"Evolution Sucks"	January 31, 1997
During a lesson by Mr. Van Driessen about evolution, Beavis and Butt-Head dream of being cavemen. In the dream, they hit each other with clubs. Featured videos: Snoop Dogg – "Gin and Juice"
162	4	"Ding-Dong-Ditch"	January 31, 1997
Beavis and Butt-Head have trouble getting ding dong ditch down correctly. Featured videos: Hole – "Violet"
163	5	"Just for Girls"	January 31, 1997
Beavis and Butt-Head go to Mrs. Dickey's girls-only sex education class. They are initially told to leave, but Mr. Van Driessen convinces her to let them stay. The class watch a short film about a 16-year-old girl, Cathy, who is impregnated by her boyfriend. The duo are disgusted at seeing Cathy give birth—and leave the room. Featured videos: Rednex – "Cotton Eye Joe"
164	6	"A Very Special Episode"	February 7, 1997
Beavis and Butt-Head are walking along the street when an injured baby bird falls in front of them. Mr. Stevenson takes them to a vet, who tells the duo that it cannot survive. At home, Beavis takes some live worms out of his pants pocket, chews them and feeds them to the bird. Butt-Head launches it into the air; it flies for a few seconds, then falls to the ground. Featured videos: Toadies – "Possum Kingdom"
165	7	"Dumbasses Anonymous"	February 7, 1997
Coach Buzzcut introduces an alcoholic to the class to convince them to stay sober. Beavis and Butt-Head go to the Rolling Hills Treatment Center, the clinic that he spends a lot of time at. There, the duo attend an Alcoholics Anonymous meeting. The duo think they can get beer there. They suggest getting a drink, and the group's members go to a bar. They get drunk—except for the duo, who are refused service by the barman due to being underage. Featured videos: Helium – "Pat's Trick" (when grouped with "A Very Special Episode" and "Just for Girls"); Deconstruction – "L.A. Song" (when grouped with "Follow Me" and "Nothing Happening")
166	8	"Underwear"	February 14, 1997
Beavis and Butt-Head visit a new lingerie store in the mall. After standing outside the store for hours, they enter. They feel up the merchandise in the belief that doing so is like feeling up the customers who will be wearing the items. Featured videos: Madonna – "Secret"
167	9	"Head Lice"	February 14, 1997
Beavis and Butt-Head are scratching their heads in class. Coach Buzzcut tells them that they have head lice, and sends them to the school nurse, who finds them in their hair. Instead of following the nurse's advice, the duo break open a bug zapper and touch the element in order to kill the lice—electrocuting themselves in the process. Beavis also has pubic lice, so he puts his genitals into the zapper, electrocuting himself again. Featured videos: Beastie Boys – "Sabotage"
168	10	"Cyber-Butt"	February 21, 1997
Beavis and Butt-Head talk Stewart into helping them look up pornography on the school computer. A librarian sees the three looking at porn and the three are sent to Principal McVicker, who gives them each detention for the rest of the year and bans them from using the computer. Featured videos: The Prodigy – "Poison"
169	11	"Nose Bleed"	February 21, 1997
Butt-Head punches Beavis, causing him a severe nosebleed. Butt-Head makes several useless attempts to help him, before plugging Beavis' nose with a tampon in each nostril. Featured videos: Lordz of Brooklyn – "Saturday Night Fever" (when grouped with "Cyber-Butt" and "U.S. History"); Chick – "Malibu" (when grouped with "Take a Lap" and "Shortcuts")
170	12	"Citizens Arrest"	February 28, 1997
Beavis and Butt-Head are working at Burger World, when a man who says he has a gun tries to rob it. A police officer walks in and congratulates the duo on making a citizen's arrest. The duo then think that they can then tell people what to do. After asserting their newfound "authority" with various customers, they run afoul of the same police officer later. Featured videos: Tool – "Prison Sex"
171	13	"Pierced"	February 28, 1997
After being beaten up outside school by Earl, who is wearing a skull earring in his left ear, Beavis and Butt-Head decide to get their ears pierced. They want to have them pierced at Pencer Gifts, but are refused piercings by the girl behind the counter due to not having their parents' permission. The boys then crudely pierce their right ears themselves at home, then go back to Pencer Gifts later the same day. They decide not to have earrings after the same member of staff informs them that a ring in the right ear only indicates homosexuality. Featured videos: MC 900 Ft. Jesus – "If I Only Had a Brain"
172	14	"A Great Day"	March 7, 1997
Beavis and Butt-Head have a great day when they find out school is closed because it is a public holiday. They then find porn magazines in a dumpster, see crashes between two cars and a truck and see two dogs having sex. The duo are paid $21 by a strange man to not mention evidence of a murder he has recently committed. The duo buy nachos and a soda at Maxi-Mart, outside which Todd drives past and takes the rest of their money, then crashes into another car and repeatedly punches the driver. Featured videos: Elastica – "Connection"
173	15	"On Strike"	March 7, 1997
The duo watch a TV news report about baseball players on strike, so they refuse to work during their shift at Burger World. A journalist speaks to them outside, then Beavis and Butt-Head's manager ends their strike after an hour when he calls them in and makes them clean under the tables. Featured videos: Coolio – "Gangsta's Paradise"
174	16	"Follow Me"	March 14, 1997
While watching TV, Beavis decides to mimic Butt-Head. He continues to do so as they walk down the street and punch each other, then are each hit by vehicles while walking into the road. They see Todd kissing his girlfriend in his car while it is parked in front of Maxi Mart and tell him that Beavis wants his chick. The duo are beaten up by Todd, who then drives away. Featured videos: Del Amitri – "Roll to Me"
175	17	"Nothing Happening"	March 14, 1997
After the TV goes out due to a damaged wire outside the house, Beavis and Butt-Head fall asleep on the couch. A plane crashes into their school, police chase a fugitive and shoot him; Stewart causes an explosion in his house using his chemistry set and the ambulance picking him up crashes into the P.A.T. van. Repairmen fix the wire and the duo wake up and see a news report about the events. Featured videos: Tom Jones – "If I Only Knew"
176	18	"Take a Lap"	March 28, 1997
After seeing an infomercial by muscular workout guru Peter Small, Beavis and Butt-Head attempt to get fit. However, they find it difficult and soon give up. The duo see a news report stating that Peter collapsed while filming another infomercial and died of heart failure. Featured videos: Scatman John – "Scatman (Ski-Ba-Bop-Ba-Dop-Bop)"
177	19	"Shortcuts"	March 28, 1997
Beavis and Butt-Head miss the school bus home and get lost trying to walk home via what Butt-Head says will be a shortcut. They walk to the other side of town before being given a lift back to Highland High in the back of a pickup truck. The next day, they stay on the bus until the end of the route and Butt-Head claims to know a shortcut. Featured videos: Rollins Band – "Disconnect"
178	20	"Bride of Butt-Head"	July 18, 1997
After seeing a magazine advertisement, Butt-Head phones a company that provides Russian mail-order brides. A Russian woman, Katya, who is already in Texas, and has recently left the man whom the company set her up with, is sent to Butt-Head. She is disappointed with him, and he is disappointed that she will not allow him to touch her. Katya gets into Todd's car, where she has sex with him. Featured videos: Pantera – "This Love"; The Murmurs – "You Suck"
179	21	"Special Delivery"	July 18, 1997
Burger World attempts to launch a delivery service, but Beavis and Butt-Head not only make their first delivery to the wrong address, they failed to collect the money for it. The manager ends the delivery service on its first night. Featured videos: The Rolling Stones – "Love Is Strong" (when paired with "Bride of Butt-Head"); U2 – "Numb" (when grouped with "Shopping Cart" and "Inventors")
180	22	"Woodshop"	July 25, 1997
The duo use a table saw in wood shop at school to cut the teacher's possessions in two, and Beavis uses it to cut his right index finger off. After it is reattached, he breaks it off again by using it to pick his nose. Featured videos: Sugartooth – "Sold My Fortune" (when grouped with "T.V. Violence" and "Vaya Con Cornholio"); Pizzicato 5 – "Twiggy, Twiggy" (when grouped with "Die Fly, Die!" and "Drinking Butt-ies")
181	23	"T.V. Violence"	July 25, 1997
When the Stevensons have a new satellite dish installed, the duo attempt to watch several violent programs with Stewart. His mother prevents them from doing so and insists that they only watch children's television series or baseball. Featured videos: R.E.M. – "Shiny Happy People"
182	24	"Canned"	August 1, 1997
While the duo are standing on a highway's central reservation, Beavis sees an unopened can of root beer at the edge of the highway. He crosses it to pick up the can, causing several vehicles to crash. They shake the can many times, then tie it to Beavis' bicycle. He rides with it with Butt-Head riding alongside, until the can becomes caught in Butt-Head's front wheel, causing them to crash to the ground outside Maxi-Mart. Todd runs over their bikes, then puts the duo and the can in the trunk of his car. Todd and his accomplice hold the duo upside down and shake them, then Todd drives off with his acquaintance. Butt-Head opens the can—which fizzes slightly—then Beavis drinks from it. Featured videos: Shaggy – "Boombastic"
183	25	"Garage Band"	August 1, 1997
After watching a rock star on being interviewed on television, the duo attempt to start a band. He says that he started by playing in someone's garage, so the duo try to play in Mr. Van Driessen's garage. Beavis plays Van Driessen's guitar, then smashes it into pieces. The duo go to a motel that needs a band, claiming that they are a band called Metallica. The duo argue and go home. The audience are angry at Metallica for not arriving. Featured videos: Soundgarden – "Black Hole Sun"
184	26	"Impotence"	August 8, 1997
Beavis and Butt-Head watch a TV ad for Leibowitz Impotence Clinic. They wrongly believe that being impotent means being unable to get sex, and go there thinking that they will receive advice about how to score. Dr Leibowitz is puzzled because the duo are easily aroused. The nurse refuses to examine them because they have erections. Leibowitz prescribes them saltpeter. Featured videos: Megadeth - Symphony of Destruction
185	27	"The Miracle That is Beavis"	August 8, 1997
The duo watch a self-help guru on TV advertise his appearance at a bookshop that night. Beavis goes there, meets him and is inspired to be more assertive. Featured videos: No videos
186	28	"Shopping Cart"	August 15, 1997
Butt-Head is in a shopping cart being pushed through a parking lot by Beavis. A car backs into Butt-Head and the driver bribes him $10 to not tell anyone about the accident. The duo reason that they can make more money the same way, so Butt-Head pushes Beavis in the cart behind another car. However, the driver backs into him, then drives off. Beavis pushes Butt-Head in the cart behind a van, which reverses into Beavis and drives off. The duo sit in the cart behind Mr. Anderson's motorhome. He backs into it and it attaches to the cart. The cart is flung off as they go around a bend and the cart crashes into a tree. Featured videos: Stone Temple Pilots – "Vasoline"
187	29	"Inventors"	August 15, 1997
The duo watch a TV ad inviting ideas for new inventions. Butt-Head bends a wire hanger and they unsuccessfully try to sell it door-to-door as a new invention, the Buttscratcher 2000. Featured videos: Tori Amos – "God"
188	30	"Die Fly, Die!"	August 22, 1997
The duo are annoyed by a fly in the lounge, so they try to kill it using a hammer, spade, hedge trimmer and baseball bat, causing a great deal of damage to the wall, toilet and couch. Butt-Head brings a full can of garbage into the room and tips it over to attract the fly to it so that they can kill it with fly spray. Butt-Head sprays so much that they are both knocked out. When they regain consciousness, Beavis throws the spray can, breaking the window. A swarm of flies enters through the hole. Featured videos: Beastie Boys – "Pass the Mic" (when grouped with "Drinking Butt-ies" and "Woodshop"); Milla – "Gentleman Who Fell" (when grouped with "Work is Death" and "Breakdown")
189	31	"Drinking Butt-ies"	August 22, 1997
Todd beats up the duo outside Maxi-Mart. He drives off to a party; the duo follow him on their bikes. They wait outside the house for six hours until a drunken Todd comes outside and talks nonsense while sitting with them on the house's front steps. All three fall asleep there. When Todd wakes, he threatens them, then drives off. Featured videos: Weezer – "Buddy Holly"
190	32	"Work is Death"	November 4, 1997
The duo find out from their manager at Burger World about the existence of workers' compensation, In an attempt to become eligible to claim, Butt-Head hits Beavis several times. When their boss tells them that does not make them eligible, Butt-Head tries to injure Beavis in ways that appear to be accidental and work-related. They fail, but unintentionally cause their boss to have an accident in the kitchen. Featured videos: Foo Fighters – "I'll Stick Around"
191	33	"Breakdown"	November 4, 1997
Principal McVicker is admitted to a mental hospital after being driven insane by the duo vandalizing the teachers' lounge. Mr. Van Driessen, Beavis and Butt-Head visit him together, during which time McVicker tries to strangle Beavis. Featured videos: Dr. Dre – "Keep Their Heads Ringin"
192	34	"Graduation Day"	November 18, 1997
Mr. Van Driessen attempts to help his class gain self-esteem by holding a mock graduation, but Beavis and Butt-Head think that it is real. After the 'ceremony', the duo walk out of class and go to Maxi-Mart, where they sit outside and eat nachos from their mortar boards. Featured videos: Janet Jackson – "You Want This"
193	35	"The Future of Beavis and Butt-Head"	November 18, 1997
The two visit a career counselor and consider different career paths. For Butt-Head: porn video store owner and TV commercial spokesman promoting beer. For Beavis: wrecking ball operator (Beavis imagines himself wrecking the school with Principal McVicker trying to stop him) and military commanding officer. Featured videos: Hum – "Stars"; Sir Mix-a-Lot – "Ride"
194	36	"Speech Therapy"	November 18, 1997
Principal McVicker is horrified when the duo walk into his office, having returned after their two-week suspension. The boys are supposed to be in Mr. Van Driessen's class, but he has taken his class to the botanical garden. McVicker sends them to a speech therapy class, where they misinterpret sentences that the therapist tells them to repeat to McVicker when he stops by to check their progress.
195	37	"Leave it to Beavis"	November 25, 1997
A Leave It to Beaver parody in which Beavis portrays The Beaver (as "The Beavis"), Butt-Head is a crude Ward, Mrs. Stevenson is an oblivious June, and Todd is a sociopathic Eddie. On his way to school, Beavis reluctantly gets into Eddie's car and is pressured by Eddie to buy him cigarettes. Beavis is unable to, due to being underage. Eddie beats him up and takes him home. Featured videos: Korn – "Blind"
196	38	"Butt Flambe"	November 25, 1997
The duo walk into hospital. Beavis' rear end is severely burned to partial cremation, which he is treated for. Butt-Head goes into the supply closet where he puts on scrubs, then masquerades as a doctor. Featured videos: Vanilla Ice – "I Love You"
197	39	"Our Founding Losers"	November 25, 1997
After the duo displays improper flag etiquette, Coach Buzzcut orders them to stay after school and write about the Founding Fathers of the United States. Instead, they fall asleep and dream about themselves as American history's famous figures.
TG1	40	"Beavis and Butt-Head Do Thanksgiving"	November 27, 1997
Extended episode, presented by Kurt Loder. The boys celebrate the season of giving with live action guest stars. Featured videos: Adam Sandler – "The Thanksgiving Song"; Marilyn Manson – "Long Hard Road Out of Hell"; Fiona Apple – "Criminal"
198	41	"Beavis and Butt-Head Are Dead"	November 28, 1997
When Highland High's secretary calls Beavis and Butt-Head's home to see why the boys are not in school, Beavis falsely claims that he and Butt-Head are dead. Principal McVicker is pleasantly surprised and even stops his typical nervous shaking. Mr. Van Driessen remembers several instances in which the duo caused major problems for him, but mourns them and tries to get the class to remember something good about the obnoxious duo. Daria echoes most of the class's sentiments by saying "it's not like they had bright futures ahead of them". The school faculty mostly agree (except Van Driessen) that although they never liked Beavis and Butt-Head, they should exploit their apparent deaths to make their trouble worthwhile. Beavis and Butt-Head see news that someone died at school, and decide to show up. As McVicker is on camera, holding a jar full of the memorial charity's change saying he would (hypothetically) trade it to have Beavis and Butt-Head back, the duo greet McVicker and cause him to have a heart attack and they end up in possession of the jar. Beavis and Butt-Head walk off into the sunset, believing that they are rich and no longer have to attend school. This episode was the original series finale, up until the 2011 revival.

=== Season 8 (2011) ===
No. overall	No. in season	Title	Directed by	Written by	Original release date	US viewers (millions)
199	1	"Werewolves of Highland"	Tony Kluck	John Altschuler and Dave Krinsky	October 27, 2011	3.286
The duo sneak into a movie theater where they watch Twilight—until they are thrown out by a member of staff during the screening. Mr. Van Driessen mentions vampires and werewolves during a class on romantic literature. The duo are confused about what the appeal of such beings is, to which Van Driessen tells the class that they are antiheroes whom women find sexually attractive. Beavis and Butt-Head leave class early and set out to get bitten by a vampire or werewolf so they can get girls. They mistake Henry, a homeless man with a myriad of diseases, for a werewolf. They ask him to bite them, which he does several times. The duo sit outside a shop, where two girls have them taken to hospital, where they are admitted to intensive care. Featured videos: MGMT – "Kids"; a clip from Jersey Shore; Skrillex – "First of the Year (Equinox)"
200	2	"Crying"	Ted Stearn	DJ Javerbaum	October 27, 2011	3.286
While eating a chili dog, Beavis sniffs a piece of onion and begins to tear up, but Butt-Head mistakes it for crying and mocks Beavis relentlessly. A flashforward 80 years shows the duo sitting in wheelchairs in a rest home, where Butt-Head mocks Beavis for the same thing. Featured videos: a clip from True Life; LMFAO featuring Natalia Kills – "Champagne Showers"
201	3	"Daughter's Hand"	Ilya Skorupsky	Jeff Goldstone	November 3, 2011	2.071
After watching an old movie, Beavis and Butt-Head ask a man for his daughter's "hand". Featured videos: a clip from 16 and Pregnant; a clip from True Life
202	4	"Tech Support"	Ted Stearn	Andy Rheingold and Scott Sonneborn	November 3, 2011	2.071
Beavis and Butt-Head get jobs working at a computer tech support center, a position for which they are woefully under-qualified. Featured videos: Katy Perry – "Firework"
203	5	"Holy Cornholio"	Ilya Skorupsky and Tony Kluck	Kristofor Brown	November 10, 2011	1.798
Beavis screws an action figure into his hand and has to go the hospital. At the hospital, a cult sees him as the second coming of the Messiah after he transforms into his alter ego, the Great Cornholio. This is an extended episode. Featured videos: a clip from Jersey Shore; T-Baby – "It's So Cold in the D"; Cage the Elephant – "In One Ear"; two clips from Teen Mom
204	6	"Drones"	Bernard Derriman and Ilya Skorupsky	Sivert Glarum and Michael Jamin	November 10, 2011	1.554
The boys go on a field trip to a military base and wind up in the virtual pilot seats of drone planes on an Afghan mission, thinking that it is Grand Theft Auto: San Andreas with planes. This is an extended episode. Featured videos: deadmau5 featuring Rob Swire – "Ghosts 'n' Stuff"; MGMT – "It's Working"; two clips from Jersey Shore; Benny Benassi – "Satisfaction"
205	7	"Supersize Me"	Geoffrey Johnson	John Altschuler and Dave Krinsky	November 17, 2011	1.559
In a parody of Super Size Me, the duo makes a documentary about teenage obesity, eating fast food for 30 days straight. Featured videos: a clip from Teen Cribs; a clip from Jersey Shore
206	8	"Bathroom Break"	Geoffrey Johnson	Greg Grabianski	November 17, 2011	1.559
At Burger World, Butt-Head realizes that he gets paid even when he goes to the bathroom, so he and Beavis go in the restroom, and they do not come out, causing a long line of customers waiting to be served. Featured videos: Edward Sharpe and the Magnetic Zeros – "Kisses Over Babylon"
207	9	"The Rat"	Ted Stearn	Kristofor Brown	December 1, 2011	1.606
Beavis and Butt-Head discover that they have a rat in the house, and befriend it after catching it, taking it with them to Burger World. Featured videos: Oh Land – "White Nights"; Battles featuring Gary Numan – "My Machines"
208	10	"Spill"	Tony Kluck	DJ Javerbaum	December 1, 2011	1.606
After hearing a TV report about a shoreline oil spill, Beavis and Butt-Head visit the site, where they try to win the affection of hot volunteers, mistaking them for the "chicks" (which are actually young oil-drenched birds) they were told about before volunteering. Featured videos: a clip from Cuff'd; a clip from Jersey Shore
209	11	"Doomsday"	Geoffrey Johnson	Greg Grabianski	December 1, 2011	1.562
When Highland residents are forced to evacuate after a toxic gas leak, Beavis and Butt-Head believe that they are the last survivors on Earth. Featured videos: Plain White T's – "1, 2, 3, 4"
210	12	"Dumb Design"	Ted Stearn	Franklin Hardy and Shane Kosakowski	December 1, 2011	1.562
The boys consider religion after learning that students who believe in creationism can skip the evolution section of biology class. Featured videos: a review segment featuring a clip from The Human Centipede (First Sequence); a clip from True Life
211	13	"Copy Machine"	Tony Kluck	Sivert Glarum and Michael Jamin	December 8, 2011	1.410
After Coach Buzzcut sends the duo to the copy room, Beavis tries to copy his butt on the new copy machine, but breaks the glass and gets stuck inside the machine. Featured videos: a clip from True Life about foot fetishes; Benny Benassi featuring Gary Go – "Cinema"
212	14	"Holding"	Ted Stearn	Andy Rheingold and Scott Sonneborn	December 8, 2011	1.410
Two porn actresses confuse twitchy compadres Beavis and Butt-Head for drug dealers. Featured videos: a clip from Jersey Shore; a clip from Spike's The Ultimate Fighter: Heavyweights
213	15	"Used Car"	Ilya Skorupsky	John Altschuler and Dave Krinsky	December 15, 2011	1.404
Beavis and Butt-Head shanghai a used car salesman on a joyride that leaves the car in pieces. Featured videos: a clip from True Life; a clip from Jersey Shore
214	16	"Bounty Hunters"	Geoffrey Johnson	Boyce Bugliari and James McLaughlin	December 15, 2011	1.404
Beavis and Butt-Head become ace bounty hunters after a chance meeting with someone they believe to be a reality TV star in a hardware store. Featured videos: Yolanda Be Cool and DCUP – "We No Speak Americano"; Avi Buffalo – "What's In It For?"
215	17	"Time Machine"	Ted Stearn	Boyce Bugliari and James McLaughlin	December 15, 2011	1.385
Beavis and Butt-Head try to erase Mr. Van Driessen's existence after falling asleep on a bus ride to a colonial village reenactment, waking up believing that they have traveled back in time to the year 1832. Featured videos: a clip from 16 and Pregnant; Porcelain Black featuring Lil Wayne – "This Is What Rock n' Roll Looks Like"
216	18	"Massage"	Geoffrey Johnson	Franklin Hardy and Shane Kosakowski	December 15, 2011	1.385
Inspired by beautiful women getting massages at the mall, Beavis and Butt-Head decide to open up their own makeshift massage shop. Featured video: a clip from Jersey Shore
217	19	"School Test"	Ilya Skorupsky	Joe Stillman	December 22, 2011	1.273
Concerned with the boys' impact on the school's public funding, Principal McVicker organizes intensive tutoring in order to help Beavis and Butt-Head prepare for the state standardized test. Featured videos: a clip from Jersey Shore; 3OH!3 – "Touchin' on My"
218	20	"Snitchers"	Tony Kluck	DJ Javerbaum	December 22, 2011	1.273
Beavis and Butt-Head are the only witnesses to Todd punching a man outside Maxi-Mart. Todd threatens them, telling them to testify in court that he hit the man in self-defense. They do not do so, but are dismissed by the court for being of bad character—and Todd is acquitted. He and his accomplices kidnap the duo from outside Maxi-Mart. Featured videos: a clip from 16 and Pregnant; a clip from True Life
219	21	"Whorehouse"	Geoffrey Johnson	Andy Rheingold and Scott Sonneborn	December 29, 2011	.919
The duo mistake an abortion clinic for a whorehouse, and try to score with the many women there. Featured videos: Travie McCoy featuring Bruno Mars – "Billionaire"; Jake Walden – "For Someone"
220	22	"Going Down"	Ilya Skorupsky	Bo Weinberg	December 29, 2011	.919
Beavis and Butt-Head get trapped in an elevator with an attractive woman and do all they can to escape. Featured videos: a clip from Jersey Shore; Earl Greyhound – "Shotgun"

=== Season 9 (2022) ===
On July 1, 2020, it was announced that two new seasons of Beavis and Butt-Head had been ordered. Produced for Paramount+, the first new season of Mike Judge's Beavis and Butt-Head premiered on August 4, 2022. The season made its linear premiere on February 8, 2023, on Comedy Central.

No. overall	No. in season	Title	Directed by	Written by	Original release date
Mike Judge's Beavis and Butt-Head
221	1	"Escape Room"	Tom Smith	Eden Dranger	August 4, 2022
Beavis and Butt-Head are recruited to join two girls to do an escape room. However, when they go in the wrong direction and end up in the bathroom, they think that is the escape room and try to solve the "puzzles" there. Featured videos: Mary Catherine – "My College Decision Reaction" from YouTube; scconvict – "how to make prison tattoo ink" from TikTok
222	2	"The Special One"	Tom Smith	Lew Morton	August 4, 2022
Beavis encounters his deity hero, Fire, who resides in a dumpster, but Fire wants him to do things such as run around the school track and later pick up discarded bottles to put in the recycling bin. When he is asked to write an essay, Beavis decides he has had enough, and gets a worker inside to put out Fire. Featured video: Cale Dodds – "I Like Where This Is Going"
223	3	"Boxed In"	Michael A. Zimmerman	Moss Perricone	August 4, 2022
After Beavis gets his electric drill confiscated in class, the two hide in a cardboard box nearby hoping to sneak in at night to recover it. However, the boxes are moved to the basement and they are unable to get out. Featured videos: Gibi ASMR – "Gibi-Slow & Gentle-ASMR" from YouTube; CNCO – "Por Amarte Así"
224	4	"Beekeepers"	Michael A. Zimmerman	Greg Grabianski	August 4, 2022
Beavis and Butt-Head encounter a farmers market where Mr. Van Driessen explains how his friend sells honey. They get the idea to harvest honey from a nest, but mistakenly take home a wasp nest. Featured video: BTS – "Dynamite"
225	5	"Roof"	John Achenbach	Lew Morton	August 11, 2022
Beavis and Butt-Head agree to wait for Amazon packages for Mr. Anderson. After throwing away Mr. Anderson's hearing aids, they find a crystal bowl, and desire to toss it from the roof. However they get stuck when Beavis climbs up without the bowl and knocks the ladder off. Butt-Head has Beavis jump off, only for him to climb back up and knock the ladder off again. Mr. Anderson returns and picks up the bowl, but fails to notice the two shouting because he did not get his hearing aids. Featured video: Post Malone – "Circles"
226	6	"River"	John Achenbach	Jess Dweck	August 11, 2022
After being denied entry to a public swimming pool, Beavis and Butt-Head find some river tubers and are inspired to join them. However, they launch from a shopping cart and then float a piece of lumber out to sea. Featured videos: Drain Medic – "Clogged Drain #124" from YouTube; AMPISOUND – "Paris Rooftop Parkour POV" from YouTube
227	7	"The New Enemy"	Geoffrey Johnson	Sam Johnson & Chris Marcil	August 18, 2022
After discovering that raccoons have been stealing and eating their nachos, Beavis and Butt-Head follow them up a tree and then make a large-scale glue trap out of a kiddie pool. After getting both the raccoons and themselves tangled up in the pool of glue, they are bear sprayed by Mr. Anderson who mistakes them for an otherworldly horror. Featured videos: Camila Cabello – "Don't Go Yet"; Institute of Human Anatomy – "Will a Cow's Eye Bounce?" from YouTube
228	8	"The Doppelgänger"	Geoffrey Johnson	Kristofor Brown	August 18, 2022
When Beavis mistakes a guy named Keith for Butt-Head, he finds that he cannot shake him. Keith is new in town and is overly friendly; he follows Beavis around and takes him along on some errands including visiting a music store. Featured video: Heidi Lavon – "How to Shake Your Meat" from TikTok
229	9	"Nice Butt-Head"	Tom Smith	Morgan Murphy	August 25, 2022
Mrs. Ortiz, the school psychiatrist, has Butt-Head take pills to control his aggressive and violent behavior, but when he eats them as often as candy, he becomes very nice. Beavis gets worried, especially when Butt-Head becomes a model student, and eventually performs a Heimlich maneuver on him to make him throw up the pills, after which Butt-Head reverts to his old self. Featured video: Alyssa's Animal Sanctuary – "Good Morning Farm" from YouTube
230	10	"Home Aide"	Tom Smith	David Javerbaum	August 25, 2022
Space aliens from an alternate universe Smart Butt-Head and Smart Beavis introduce the segment in which they observe middle-aged Beavis and Butt-Head after they had grown up past being teenagers in the 1990s. Old Butt-Head tells Old Beavis to go to the unemployment office to get some more money, and is given a job as a home aide, only to find that the person he is aiding is Old Butt-Head. Featured videos: JoJo – "Worst (I Assume)"; Stargirl the Practical Witch – "Your Future Self" from YouTube
231	11	"Virtual Stupidity"	Michael A. Zimmerman	Jordan Mendoza	September 1, 2022
Beavis and Butt-Head mistake regular sunglasses for virtual reality glasses for a video game as they wander around the mall. After being unable to get weapons, they go outside and try to kill themselves to start over. When they are hit by a car and wake up in a hospital, they put on the glasses again and think they were successful, and assault the driver of the car coming to apologize. Featured videos: Voice Lesson.com – "Want a Smooth Voice? Do This:" from YouTube; Josie Dunne – "Good Boys"
232	12	"Locked Out"	Michael A. Zimmerman	Greg Grabianski	September 1, 2022
Beavis and Butt-Head find themselves locked out of their house. They break a window but inadvertently pierce their crotch with the broken glass. Then they tell Mr. Anderson that some boys keyed his truck, hoping to have him drive off and yank the door open with a chain, but Beavis is confused about the instructions. Mr. Anderson drives off, dragging a tree with him and yanking the entire side of the house wall open, after which he is arrested. Featured video: Tones and I – "Cloudy Day"
233	13	"Kidney"	John Achenbach	David Javerbaum	September 8, 2022
Because his couch seat has a spring poking through, Old Beavis decides to sit on Butt-Head's side and refuses to move, even to go to the bathroom. Both his kidneys pop and he has to go to the hospital. He needs a kidney transplant, but the only compatible donor in the area turns out to be their former neighbor and classmate Stewart. While the transplant is successful, Old Beavis resents having a part of Stewart in himself, and immediately downs a bottle of wine to make his brand new kidney pop too. Featured video: Tyler, the Creator featuring Kali Uchis – "See You Again"
234	14	"The Good Deed"	John Achenbach	Lew Morton	September 8, 2022
After seeing Beavis and Butt-Head trying to do pest control yard work, Mr. Anderson shows them some DDT insecticide that he got from Mexico. Beavis and Butt-Head read the warning label: it is in Spanish and has a picture of a fly, so they assume it is Spanish fly aphrodisiac. Hoping to do a good deed, they bring it to the school dance as a substitute for the punch so that everyone can score, but end up drinking it all themselves. In the hospital, the doctors conclude that the DDT caused no brain damage; vowing never to do a good deed again, both of them promptly flatline. Featured videos: "Relax with Rafe" from YouTube; Benee – "Supalonely"
235	15	"Two Stupid Men"	Geoffrey Johnson	Moss Perricone	September 15, 2022
Old Beavis and Butt-Head serve on a jury, but vote not guilty against the other members, believing that committing crime is "cool". During another review of the video footage, Old Butt-Head accidentally points out inconsistencies in witness testimony, convincing the other members that the defendant is not guilty; the two then vote guilty, because the defendant lied about being cool. The result is a hung jury where the defendant goes free, and is immediately linked to a series of robberies. Featured videos: Cardi B featuring Megan Thee Stallion – "WAP"; nichellelaus – "Zip Tied to a Tree" from YouTube
236	16	"Freaky Friday"	Geoffrey Johnson	David Javerbaum	September 15, 2022
Beavis and Butt-Head prank customers at a convenience store by shaking carbonated beverages, but one of the guys gets upset and smashes their heads together. When they wake up, instead of looking in a mirror, they look through a glass at each other and think they have swapped bodies. Featured video: Olivia Rodrigo – "Drivers License"
237	17	"Weird Girl"	Tom Smith	Jess Dweck	September 22, 2022
After Beavis has a Cornholio outburst and is restrained by school security, he catches the eye of a classmate, Glennis, who develops a crush on him, which both Beavis and Butt-Head remain oblivious to. Glennis is eventually arrested for burning down the school's honors monument (a trailer). Featured video: a clip from How Far Is Tattoo Far?
238	18	"Time Travelers"	Tom Smith	Chris Marcil	September 22, 2022
Beavis and Butt-Head believe they can time travel when they enter a different time zone. Featured videos: Jacob Sartorius – "Chapstick"; Shark Week - "Diving with Bull Sharks" from YouTube
239	19	"Spiritual Journey"	Michael A. Zimmerman	Dan O'Keefe	September 29, 2022
After seeing Jesus in a nacho, Beavis seeks spiritual guidance. Featured videos: Leikeli47 – "Attitude"; Nela Zisser - "New Zealand Girl Eats 10 Big Macs" from YouTube; Marina – "Venus Fly Trap"; AXN Asia - "Lizard Dinner" from YouTube; Note: This is a double-segment length episode.
240	20	"Refuse Service"	John Achenbach	Kristofor Brown	October 6, 2022
Beavis and Butt-Head learn that they have the right to refuse service to customers. Featured videos: Olivia Rodrigo – "Good 4 U"; JonsBones – "Unboxing Human Skulls" from YouTube
241	21	"Downward Dumbass"	John Achenbach	Greg Grabianski	October 6, 2022
Beavis tries on a pair of yoga pants and cannot get them off. Featured videos: Kent Survival – "Bushcraft Breakfast" from YouTube
242	22	"The Most Dangerous Game"	Geoffrey Johnson	Jess Dweck	October 13, 2022
After Beavis mentions learning about the hand in warm water trick to get someone to pee their pants, the two engage in a lengthy battle to get the other to fall asleep first, culminating in them staying awake for several days, eventually passing out in school and both wetting their pants. Featured video: Cold Steel - "Chinese War Sword" from YouTube
243	23	"Bone Hunters"	Geoffrey Johnson	Greg Grabianski	October 13, 2022
After learning about how lucrative dinosaur exhibits in museums are, Beavis and Butt-Head build a giant dinosaur exhibit on their front porch made out of bones they found in the trash. The curiosity becomes popular and they begin earning money, but exhibit is ruined when they get into a fight about revenue sharing. Featured video: a clip from Ghosted: Love Gone Missing

=== Season 10 (2023) ===
On March 8, 2023, Paramount+ announced that the series would return with a new season, which premiered April 20, 2023.

No. overall	No. in season	Title	Directed by	Written by	Original release date
Mike Judge's Beavis and Butt-Head
244	1	"Meditation Sucks"	Tom Smith	Meghan Pleticha	April 20, 2023
Beavis and Butt-Head try emptying their minds and discover that they're surprisingly good at it. Featured video: Lil Nas X featuring Jack Harlow – "Industry Baby"
245	2	"Polling Place"	John Achenbach	Jimmy O. Yang	April 20, 2023
Beavis and Butt-Head mistake a polling station for a strip club. Featured videos: Wale – "Poledancer"; Quarter Hoarder – "Metal Detecting" from YouTube
246	3	"Old Man Beavis"	Tom Smith	Artie Johann	April 20, 2023
After Butt-Head makes Beavis up to look old so that they can buy beer, Beavis ends up in a senior living facility and almost scores with one of the residents. Featured video: Creezy - "Summer Trickshots" from YouTube
247	4	"Tom Anderson's War Stories: Incheon"	Tom Smith	Lew Morton	April 20, 2023
Tom Anderson recounts his time in the Battle of Incheon.
248	5	"Hunting Trip"	Tom Smith	Aaron Brownstein and Simon Ganz	April 20, 2023
Tom Anderson takes Beavis and Butt-Head out into the woods to hunt deer. Featured video: Audrey Nuna featuring Jack Harlow – "Comic Sans"
249	6	"Pardon Our Dust"	Geoffrey Johnson	Chris Marcil	April 27, 2023
Old Beavis and Butt-Head unwittingly convince the city council to demolish their apartment building for beer money. Featured video: Tiësto featuring Karol G – "Don't Be Shy"
250	7	"Pranks"	Michael A. Zimmerman	Greg Grabianski	April 27, 2023
Beavis and Butt-Head repeatedly ask a naive couple for items to vandalize their house with. Featured video: Nicki Minaj – "Barbie Tingz"; Note: The end of the episode was dedicated to storyboard artist Jessie N. Romero.
251	8	"Hellhole"	John Achenbach	Aaron Brownstein and Simon Ganz	May 4, 2023
Beavis and Butt-Head fall down a sewer and wake up believing that they're in hell. Featured video: Ariana Grande – "34+35"
252	9	"Take a Bow"	Tom Smith	Sam Johnson and Chris Marcil	May 4, 2023
Butt-Head's game lands Beavis in the hospital. Featured videos: BadlandsChugs – "Mountain Dew Chug" from YouTube; Camino – "Burning Fire"
253	10	"Tobacco Farmers"	Michael A. Zimmerman	Moss Perricone	May 11, 2023
Beavis and Butt-Head decide to plant tobacco using cigarette butts after learning about George Washington. Featured video: Sabrina Carpenter – "Skinny Dipping"
254	11	"Married"	Geoffrey Johnson	Chris Marcil and Sam Johnson	May 11, 2023
Old Beavis and Butt-Head accidentally end up getting married after getting in the wrong line to get their car licenses back. Featured video: Elena Taber - "My NYC Apartment Tour" from YouTube
255	12	"Sad Boys"	Michael A. Zimmerman	Miles Woods	May 18, 2023
Beavis and Butt-Head end up in a psychiatric facility after deciding that acting sad can help them score. Featured video: A clip from Help! I'm in a Secret Relationship! Season 1, Episode 7 "Julie & Carlos"
256	13	"Are You There, God? It's Me, Beavis"	John Achenbach	Moss Perricone	May 18, 2023
Beavis notices that his body is going through changes after being bitten by a rabid skunk. Featured video: Tank featuring Ty Dolla Sign and Trey Songz – "When We" (Remix)
257	14	"The Day Butt-Head Went Too Far"	Michael A. Zimmerman	Greg Grabianski	May 25, 2023
Beavis goes in search of a hitman after Butt-Head repeatedly slaps his sunburn. Featured video: Lil Nas X – "Montero (Call Me By Your Name)"
258	15	"Tom Anderson's War Stories: Heartbreak Ridge"	Michael A. Zimmerman	Lew Morton	May 25, 2023
Tom Anderson recounts his time in the Battle of Heartbreak Ridge explaining windshield wipers to his platoon.
259	16	"Spring Break"	John Achenbach	Moss Perricone	May 25, 2023
Beavis and Butt-Head mail themselves to Florida thinking it's Spring Break and end up in a landfill where they find a derelict car that was about to get crushed killing them both. Featured video: Brave Wilderness – "Milking Deadly Snakes" from YouTube
260	17	"The Warrior"	Geoffrey Johnson	Chris Marcil	June 1, 2023
Butt-Head offers to train Beavis after a classmate threatens to beat him up after school. Featured video: Jerry Ghionis - "How to Pose Men for Photography" from YouTube
261	18	"Vasectomies"	Geoffrey Johnson	Lisa Best	June 1, 2023
Old Beavis and Butt-Head decide to get vasectomies thinking that it will help them score. Featured video: alpha m. - "6 Steps to Be a Confident Alpha Male in 30 Days!" from YouTube
262	19	"Stolen Valor"	Tom Smith	Adrian McNair	June 8, 2023
Old Beavis and Butt-Head manage to bluff their way through an American Legion meeting hosted by Tom Anderson to commemorate Flag Day. Featured video: Ava Max – "Torn"
263	20	"Breeding Frenzy"	Tom Smith	Aaron Brownstein and Simon Ganz	June 8, 2023
Beavis and Butt-Head decide to get into dog breeding by using a raccoon thinking it's a dog. Featured video: Ali Spagnola - "I Turn My Car into a Giant Chia Pet" from YouTube
264	21	"Hoarders"	Michael A. Zimmerman	Annabel Seymour	June 15, 2023
Beavis and Butt-Head decide to start hoarding due to the girls in their class being fans of the show Hoarders. The pair end up not being able to find their way out of the house. Featured video: The Knitting Man – "How I Learnt to Knit" from YouTube
265	22	"Needle Dicks"	Michael A. Zimmerman	Artie Johann	June 15, 2023
Mr. Van Driessen suggests that Beavis and Butt-Head try acupuncture after noticing their inability to concentrate. Beavis, unlike Butt-Head, benefits from it and decides to keep the needles in. Featured video: Doug Zed - "How to Scream: 4 Simple Steps for Complete Beginners" from YouTube
266	23	"The Ciabatta Zone"	John Achenbach	Dave Ihlenfeld and David Wright	June 22, 2023
A jealous Beavis decides to create his own costume after Butt-Head is given a hamburger costume to wear to promote Burger World's newest hamburger. Featured videos: Post Malone featuring Roddy Ricch – "Cooped Up"; Ryan Serhant - "Daily Routine of a CEO – How I Structure My Day (Update)" from YouTube
267	24	"Tom Anderson's War Stories: Korean Farmhouse"	John Achenbach	Lew Morton	June 22, 2023
Tom Anderson tells the story of his time serving in the Korean War fixing a farmer's kitchen pipe.
268	25	"Warehouse"	John Achenbach	Steve Lookner	June 22, 2023
Old Beavis and Butt-Head get jobs working at a warehouse for an online company.
269	26	"Abduction"	Geoffrey Johnson	Chris Marcil and Sam Johnson	June 29, 2023
Smart Beavis and Smart Butt-Head are sent to Earth where they abduct Tom Anderson for human experiments. Featured video: Ronnie Dunn – "Let the Cowboy Rock"
270	27	"Sleepover"	Geoffrey Johnson	David Javerbaum	June 29, 2023
Beavis and Butt-Head are invited to stay for dinner and a sleepover when Cody's mom mistakes them as his friends. Featured video: Healing Vibrations - "Purity Sound Bath" from YouTube

=== Season 11 (2025) ===
The new season premiered on September 3, 2025 on Comedy Central. The network was supposed to air the first two seasons of the reboot.

No. overall	No. in season	Title	Directed by	Written by	Original release date
Mike Judge's Beavis and Butt-Head
271	1	"Braces"	Geoffrey Johnson	Sarah Naftalis	September 3, 2025
After a mishap with a caramel apple, Butt-Head loses his braces and suddenly believes he is beautiful. Featured videos: "Fight Tips with Shane Fazen" from YouTube; Houston Jones - "Slow Motion Injuries" from YouTube
272	2	"Heart Attack"	Geoffrey Johnson	Greg Grabianski	September 3, 2025
Old Butt-Head suffers a heart attack and it is up to Old Beavis to save him. Featured video: Lamb of God – "Ditch"
273	3	"Plumber's Helpers"	Tom Smith	Sam Johnson and Chris Marcil	September 3, 2025
Old Beavis and Butt-Head are reunited with their childhood hero, Todd, after a neighbor asks them for help. Featured video: Dermot Kennedy – "For Island Fires and Family"
274	4	"A.I."	Susan Dietter	Greg Grabianski	September 3, 2025
Beavis and Butt-Head turn to what they think is A.I. to do their homework. Featured video: Greg Doucette – "Life Hack: Meal Sizes" from YouTube
275	5	"Scent of a Dumbass"	Tom Smith	Moss Perricone	September 10, 2025
Beavis and Butt-Head mistake a can of Mace for cologne. Featured videos: Purgatory Adventures - "Haunted Weyburn" from YouTube; Kameron Marlowe – "Tequila Talkin'"
276	6	"New Couch"	Susan Dietter	Adrian McNair	September 10, 2025
Old Beavis and Butt-Head try to get a couch into their apartment. Featured video: Tiny House Giant Journey - "DIY homemade camper" from YouTube
277	7	"Nuts"	Albert Calleros	Moss Perricone	September 17, 2025
Beavis discovers that he has a nut allergy. Featured video: Olivia Rodrigo – "Get Him Back!"
278	8	"Tom Anderson's War Stories: Love"	Valerie Fletcher	Lew Morton	September 17, 2025
Tom Anderson recalls falling in love with a nurse during the Battle of Bloody Ridge.
279	9	"Bike"	Albert Calleros	Sam Johnson & Chris Marcil	September 17, 2025
Old Beavis and Butt-Head pay Stewart a visit after Butt-Head tells Beavis that it was Stewart who stole his bike when he was a kid. Featured video: The Kid LAROI – "Love Again"
280	10	"Life Savers"	Geoffrey Johnson	Greg Grabianski	September 24, 2025
Mr. Van Driessen gets badly injured in the woods, and it's up to Beavis and Butt-Head to rescue him. Featured video: P.O.R. Wrestling - "Body Slam off Roof!" from YouTube
281	11	"Tattoo"	Geoffrey Johnson	Greg Grabianski	September 24, 2025
Old Beavis wakes up and discovers a tattoo on his chest that he doesn't remember getting the night before. Featured video: Ian Munsick – "White Buffalo"
282	12	"Too Big to Fail"	Tom Smith	Kristofor Brown & Greg Grabianski	October 1, 2025
Old Beavis helps Old Butt-Head gain weight to prevent them from being evicted. Featured video: Tipsy Bartender - "Bathtub Jungle Juice" from YouTube
283	13	"Swipe Right with David Van Driessen"	Valerie Fletcher	Lew Morton	October 1, 2025
Mr. Van Driessen's date ditches him at a restaurant.
284	14	"Metal Detector"	Tom Smith	Greg Grabianski & Moss Perricone	October 1, 2025
Beavis and Butt-Head borrow Tom Anderson's metal detector to search for buried treasure. Featured video: Chef Jean-Pierre - "Creamed Spinach" from YouTube
285	15	"Depositors"	Susan Dietter	Lew Morton	October 8, 2025
Beavis and Butt-Head try donating sperm at a commercial bank. Featured video: High Valley – "Your Mama"
286	16	"Tom Anderson's War Stories: Summer of Love"	Valerie Fletcher	Lew Morton	October 8, 2025
Tom Anderson recalls becoming disillusioned with the Vietnam War, leaving the army, and ending up in San Francisco during the Summer of Love.
287	17	"Nacho Shake"	Susan Dietter	Sam Johnson & Chris Marcil	October 8, 2025
Beavis and Butt-Head invent a nacho shake at Burger World. Featured video: Slapfight Championship - "Tim 'The Maine-iac' Sylvia vs 'the Bouncer'" from YouTube; Guest star: James Hetfield as himself
288	18	"Ear"	Albert Calleros	Greg Grabianski	October 15, 2025
Butt-Head blows off Beavis's ear with a rocket. Featured video: DANAMIC - "Meet the Man with Over 12,000 Toys and Dolls" from YouTube
289	19	"Songs of Nature"	Valerie Fletcher	David Javerbaum	October 15, 2025
Mr. Van Driessen tries to perform a song he's written about nature.
290	20	"Dearly Departed"	Albert Calleros	Aaron Brownstein & Simon Ganz	October 15, 2025
Beavis gets stuck in a vent and Butt-Head convinces him that he's dead and is now a ghost. Featured video: Real Men Real Style - "The Only 5 Pocket Square Folds You'll EVER Need!" from YouTube
291	21	"The Mission"	Geoffrey Johnson	Moss Perricone	October 29, 2025
Old Beavis and Butt-Head join a church mission to Mexico assuming that they're going to war, and wreak havoc across the border. Featured video: Marni Wing Girl - "Women Prefer Older Men" from YouTube
292	22	"Tom Anderson's Vacation Stories"	Geoffrey Johnson	Moss Perricone	October 29, 2025
Tom Anderson's first vacation in 15 years is in Mexico and he's nearly killed by Old Beavis and Butt-Head (as they arrive from "The Mission") before he attacks them and leaves them to be beaten by Mexican police.
293	23	"Beavis H."	Tom Smith	Artie Johann	October 29, 2025
A new student whose first name is also Beavis arrives at the school. Featured video: Lars Andersen - "A New Level of Archery" from YouTube
294	24	"Work from Home"	Tom Smith	Jon Foor	November 12, 2025
Old Beavis and Butt-Head decide to return to work (and live) at Burger World. Featured video: Doja Cat – "Paint the Town Red"
295	25	"Story Time with Dr. Beavis and Dr. Butt-Head"	Valerie Fletcher	Lew Morton & Chris Marcil	November 12, 2025
Old Dr. Beavis and Dr. Butt-Head narrate their book Lumbass the Dumbass, a story in the style of Dr. Seuss.
296	26	"Bed and Breakfast"	Geoffrey Johnson	Greg Grabianski	November 12, 2025
A woman mistakes Beavis and Butt-Head's house for her Airbnb. Featured video: Hozier – "Dinner & Diatribes"
297	27	"Million Dollar Reward"	Susan Dietter	Alexandra Decas & Melanie Kirschbaum	November 26, 2025
Old Beavis confesses to a crime he didn't commit in order for Old Butt-Head to collect reward money for turning him in. Featured video: SZA – "Kill Bill"
298	28	"Get Well Soon"	Susan Dietter	Jen Bashian	November 26, 2025
Beavis helps Butt-Head break his arm in order to get attention from their female classmates. Featured video: Y2K & bbno$ – "Lalala"
299	29	"Oldholio"	Albert Calleros	Kristofor Brown & Greg Grabianski	December 10, 2025
Old Beavis helps himself to a variety of medications at a pharmacy and becomes Cornholio. Featured video: Rob Thomas – "One Less Day (Dying Young)"
300	30	"The Discoverers"	Albert Calleros	Marla Black	December 10, 2025
Smart Beavis and Smart Butt-Head recall the day they traveled to Normal Earth to plant a navigation beacon and discovered masturbation. Featured video: Post Malone – "Insane"

=== Season 12 (2026) ===
The twelfth season premiered October 14, 2026 on Comedy Central.

No. overall	No. in season	Title	Directed by	Written by	Original release date
Mike Judge's Beavis and Butt-Head
301	1	"Spanish-ish"	Traci Honda	Dan O'Keefe	October 14, 2026
Beavis and Butt-Head accidentally watch television in Spanish non-stop for two weeks and forget how to speak English. Featured video: Billie Eilish – "What Was I Made For?"
302	2	"TSA-holes"	Geoffrey Johnson	Greg Grabianski	October 14, 2026
Old Beavis and Butt-Head get jobs as TSA agents. Featured video: Steve Wallis – "Urban Stealth Camping Disguised As Businessman" from YouTube
303	3	"Stewart Moves In"	Tom Smith	Sam Johnson & Chris Marcil	October 14, 2026
Stewart announces he's getting divorced and moves in with Old Beavis and Butt-Head. Featured video: Jujimufu - "Hardcore Home Gyms Ep. 18" from YouTube
304	4	"Body Cam"	Tom Smith	Matt Quezada & Ruben Lee Martinez	October 14, 2026
Beavis and Butt-Head wear a bulletproof vest with a body cam, left behind by Beavis' mom's new boyfriend, to impress chicks. Featured video: charlieonnafriday featuring Lil Tjay – "Same Friends"
305	5	"Beavis, Take the Wheel"	Traci Honda	Melanie Kirschbaum & Alexandra Decas	October 21, 2026
Old Butt-Head attempts to teach Old Beavis to drive. Featured video: Bryan Johnson – "My 2025 Longevity Protocol" from YouTube
306	6	"Humor in Uniform with Tom Anderson"	Traci Honda	Lew Morton	October 21, 2026
Tom Anderson tells the tale of a private first class who stays at a farm and promises not to sleep with the farmer's daughters.
307	7	"Pleasure Washer"	Geoffrey Johnson	Adrian McNair	October 21, 2026
Beavis and Butt-Head are instructed to clean the walkway in front of Burger World with a pressure washer and use it for everything but. Featured video: Behemoth – "The Shit Ov God"
308	8	"Schlongmerica"	Susan Dieter	Sam Johnson & Chris Marcil	October 28, 2026
Beavis and Butt-Head get lost in the woods and decide to start their own civilization. Featured video: HARDY – "Jim Bob"
309	9	"Hot Car"	Geoffrey Johnson	Greg Grabianski	October 28, 2026
Old Butt-Head must save Old Beavis when he gets locked in a hot car. Featured video: "Defense and Blocking with Two Handed Axe" from YouTube
310	10	"Power Grip"	Traci Honda	Greg Grabianski	November 4, 2026
Old Butt-Head discovers Old Beavis's freakishly strong grip from years of spanking his monkey. Featured video: Lola Young – "Messy"
311	11	"Swipe Right with David Van Driessen: Picnic"	Susan Dietter	Dan O'Keefe	November 4, 2026
Van Driessen's picnic is cut short after offering his date a vegan cake.
311	11	"Double Vision"	Susan Dietter	Sierra Katow	November 4, 2026
After getting hit in head with a bowling ball, Beavis sees double. Featured video: "The Most Relaxing Luxury Doggy Facial Ever" from YouTube
312	12	"Fender Benders"	Geoffrey Johnson	Sam Fishell	November 11, 2026
Old Beavis and Butt-Head discover that car accidents lead to women giving them their phone numbers. Featured video: Armani White (with A$AP Ferg) – "Silver Tooth"
313	13	"Swipe Right with David Van Driessen: Bathroom Window"	Valerie Fletcher	Lew Morton	November 11, 2026
Van Driessen's date excuses herself and escapes out the restaurant's bathroom window after he makes a lame joke to their waitress.
314	14	"Chickens"	Traci Honda	Sam Fishell	November 11, 2026
Beavis and Butt-Head decide to get a chicken to sell its eggs and get rich. Featured video: "Catching Catfish with My Bare Hands" from YouTube; Note: Tom Anderson makes his first-ever appearance in a video commentary segment.
315	15	"Burglar Alarm"	Tom Smith	Sam Fishell	November 18, 2026
Beavis and Butt-Head set off their smoke alarm while making homemade nachos. Featured video: "Downhill Skateboard Racing" from YouTube
316	16	"Dr. Beavis and Dr. Butt-Head's Songs for Children"	Valerie Fletcher	Lew Morton & Chris Marcil & Greg Grabianski	November 18, 2026
Old Dr. Beavis and Dr. Butt-Head sing songs for children.
317	17	"TSA-holes 2: Protecting America"	Tom Smith	Greg Grabianski	November 18, 2026
Old Beavis and Butt-Head continue working as TSA agents. Featured video: Dayglow – "Every Little Thing I Say I Do"
318	18	"Bottle of Beer"	TBA	TBA	November 25, 2026
319	19	"Put Down"	TBA	TBA	November 25, 2026
320	20	"Beavis Moves Out"	TBA	TBA	November 25, 2026
321	21	"Bold New Voice"	TBA	TBA	November 25, 2026
322	22	"Court Mandated A.A."	TBA	TBA	December 2, 2026
323	23	"Dumbasses of Wall Street"	TBA	TBA	December 2, 2026
324	24	"Old Flames"	TBA	TBA	December 9, 2026
325	25	"Rescue 69-1-1"	TBA	TBA	December 9, 2026
326	26	"Cornholiozilla: Doombringer of Earth"	TBA	TBA	December 16, 2026

== Films ==
Title	Directed by	Written by	Original release date (U.S.)
Beavis and Butt-Head Do America	Mike Judge	Mike Judge & Joe Stillman	December 20, 1996
Beavis and Butt-Head Do the Universe	John Rice & Albert Calleros	Mike Judge & Lew Morton	June 23, 2022

== Miscellaneous appearances ==
- Appearances at the 1992 MTV Video Music Awards, 1993 MTV Video Music Awards, 1994 MTV Video Music Awards, 1995 MTV Video Music Awards, 1996 MTV Video Music Awards, 1997 MTV Movie Awards, 69th Academy Awards, MTV's 20th Anniversary, 2005 MTV Video Music Awards and 2011 MTV Video Music Awards
- Appearance in a Paramount+ commercial in Super Bowl LV. They also appeared in four Super Bowl specials from 1994 to 1997.
- Appearance in the April 1993 music video for AC/DC's Back in Black (called the "Beavis and Butt-Head Version" on MTV's website)
- Appearance (in voice only) on the 1994 movie Airheads
- Appearance on The Brothers Grunt episode "Close Encounters of the Grunt Kind" (12/19/1994)
- Appearance in Clueless
- Appearance in AC/DC's Ballbreaker World Tour before concert video (1996)
- Appearances on Late Show with David Letterman (12/1993 and 12/13/1996)
- Appearance at the end of the Friends episode "The One Where Ross and Rachel... You Know" (during the credits roll, Joey and Chandler watch them on TV; 02/08/1996)
- Appearances on Saturday Night Live (12/14/1996 and 9/02/2003)
- Mentioned in the "Animated Videos" episode of MTV's All Time Top 10 by Daria Morgendorffer (in the style of her own series) and Jane Lane, and their music video for "Love Rollercoaster" is featured (6/28/1998)
- Appearance on Celebrity Deathmatch (2/11/2001; third-season finale)
- Appearance in Duke Nukem 3D (PC version) (Butt-Head's voice only – voiced by Randy Pitchford)
- Appearance in Duke Nukem 64 (Butt-Head's voice only – voiced by Randy Pitchford)
- Appearance on Jackassworld.com: 24 Hour Takeover (watched the music video for Steve-O's song "Poke the Puss" and provided negative commentary) (2/23/2008)
- Appearance in a promotional video for Mike Judge's 2009 film Extract
- Appearance in Austin Powers: International Man of Mystery
- Appearance in Jackass 3D
- Appearance on Jimmy Kimmel Live! (10/25/2011)
- Appearance on Two and a Half Men episode "A Possum on Chemo" (01/16/2012)
- Appearance in Sandy Wexler (during the end credits, voiced by Mike Judge)
- Appearance on Family Guy episode "Peter & Lois' Wedding" (11/10/2019; voiced by Mike Judge)
- Appearance on Paramount+ TV Spot, with Josh Allen & Peppa Pig (01/21/2024)
