= Escape Room (Beavis and Butt-Head) =

- Beavis and Butt-Head episode
- Butt-Head trying to get a plunger off Beavis's head
- Episode no.: Season 9 Episode 1
- Directed by: Tom Smith
- Written by: Eden Dranger
- Production code: 101A
- Original air date: August 4, 2022

Episode chronology
← Previous "Going Down"	Next → "The Special One"

"Escape Room" is the first episode of season 9 and 221st episode overall of the American animated television series Beavis and Butt-Head. It is the first episode of the 2022 reboot of the show, debuting on Paramount+ on August 4, 2022, along with the episodes "The Special One", "Boxed In" and "Beekeepers", the first of which is this episode's sister episode.

Beavis and Butt-Head head to an escape room with two women, in hopes to "score". On the way to the escape room, the titular duo go into the bathroom, mistaking it for the escape room.

== Plot ==
Two women go into an escape room building, asking to play "Escaping the Mummy's Tomb", to which the worker tells them they need at least four players. Beavis and Butt-Head are seen outside, placing milk jugs on the road, letting them get run over. In desperation, the women invite the duo to the escape room with them. Thinking they are going to "score", Beavis and Butt-Head accept the offer. Instead of going into the escape room, the duo mistakenly goes in the bathroom on the other side, thinking it is the escape room. They scour the bathroom for clues, while the two women are standing outside, waiting for them, thinking they actually need to use the bathroom. During the wait, two other men named Kyle and Brad join them; the women opt to go into the escape room with them instead.

Beavis and Butt-Head find a piece of fecal matter in the toilet of one of the stalls, thinking its a clue. After Butt-Head comments that the mummy is "disgusting", he finds a toilet plunger, thinking its another clue. and uses it to try to open the bathroom door. Beavis is accidentally knocked to the bathroom's ventilation, which breaks open; this is where the duo thinks they need to escape from. However, they end up inside another bathroom, where Beavis wrap himself in toilet paper to try and find a clue, while Butt-Head clogs one of the toilets. The worker notices the flood from the bathroom and runs to see how it was caused. Beavis and Butt-Head walk out the bathroom's open door before they can be caught. They discover the two women leaving with Kyle and Brad, whom Beavis asks where they are going, while Butt-Head thinks they scared them off with their "geniusing". Actually needing to use the bathroom now, Beavis asks the worker where it is; this time they instead end up in the actual escape room. Butt-Head comments that "this bathroom is weird", but the duo proceed to use it like a bathroom; the worker catches them and begs them to stop.

== Featured videos ==
- Mary Catherine – My College Decision Reaction from YouTube
- scconvict – how to make prison tattoo ink from TikTok

== Reception ==
Reviewing this and the rest of the four episodes of the season, Brittany Vincent of IGN stated "..the fact that they’re still funny is a miracle, when so many factors could have gone wrong with this revival. It’s not easy to retain a series' humor and spirit when adapting it for a new audience, but these new stories land fantastically, even when some of the jokes tend to get a little long in the tooth." Carys Anderson at Consequence describes the episode as "pretty run-of-the-mill," but notes that "one girl's quip that the weirdos "must be in tech or something" offers a hilariously unexpected jab at a different brand of annoying guy, and a quick reminder that we really are witnessing Beavis and Butt-Head in 2022." Fred Topel from United Press International notes "...there are plenty of new activities and business in 2022 worthy of the Beavis and Butt-Head treatment. The clues would surely stump Beavis and Butt-Head, but they never even get that far.
