= The Special One (Beavis and Butt-Head) =

- Beavis and Butt-Head episode
- Episode no.: Season 9 Episode 2
- Directed by: Tom Smith
- Written by: Lew Morton
- Production code: 101B
- Original air date: August 4, 2022

Episode chronology
| ← Previous "Escape Room" | Next → "Boxed In" |

"The Special One" is the second episode of season 9 and 222nd episode overall of the American animated television series Beavis and Butt-Head. It is the second episode of the 2022 revival of the show, debuting on Paramount+ on August 4, 2022, along with the episodes "Escape Room", "Boxed In" and "Beekeepers", the first of which is this episode's sister episode.

Beavis stumbles upon a literal dumpster fire, which he imagines coming to life, and is told to do some good deeds.

Butt-Head does not appear in the episode proper, besides a voiceless cameo in a flashback as a young child.

== Plot ==
Beavis is in a restaurant called "Mega Wings", where he asks the cashier if they have any matches or a lighter; he replies that they do not and tells him to leave. After Beavis leaves the restaurant, he discovers a dumpster fire behind the building, which he imagines coming to life. The fire shows Beavis a flashback of his third birthday, where it shows the fire talking to him, showing the origins of his fascination with the element. Back in the present day, the fire tells Beavis that he's his "special one", and gives him a list of deeds to do, starting with running around the track at his school four times, adding up to one mile; he was told to do this as the fire felt he needed some "good exercise." Next, he commands Beavis to pick up plastic bottles around the streets and put them in the recycling bin; Beavis reluctantly agrees after further convincing from the fire. After Beavis returns, he is told to read The Call of the Wild, and to write a two-page report on it. Beavis asks the fire why he keeps making him do these deeds, to which he replies that he's preparing Beavis for his future life. Tired of doing the deeds, Beavis regrettably tells the cashier in the restaurant about the dumpster, who extinguishes it. Afterward, Beavis finds a lighter on the ground and walks off into the night with it.

== Featured video ==
- Cale Dodds - "I Like Where This Is Going"

== Production ==
In the initial seasons of the show, controversy surrounding Beavis' love of fire forced the show to remove Beavis' references to his love of fire and the use of the word later in the show's run. This ban was lifted during the first revival in 2011. When discussing how came up with the idea of the episode, creator Mike Judge stated "Somebody had an idea for an all-musical episode with 'Fire' as a character. I didn't want to do a whole musical because South Park does that better than anybody."

Notably, Butt-Head does not appear in the episode proper, besides a voiceless cameo during a flashback as a young child where Beavis discovers his fascination with fire, making it the first and, so far, only episode in which Butt-Head makes no live appearances. He does appear during the video segment, however. To reflect Butt-Head's absence, the episodes opening theme bills the fire in place of Butt-Head.

== Reception ==
Reviewing this and the first episode of the season, Brittany Vincent of IGN stated, "..the fact that they're still funny is a miracle, when so many factors could have gone wrong with this revival. It's not easy to retain a series' humor and spirit when adapting it for a new audience, but these new stories land fantastically, even when some of the jokes tend to get a little long in the tooth." Fred Topel from United Press International observes the episode "...applies a more modern sense of absurdity to Beavis and Butt-Head. Beavis's alter ego The Great Cornholio was always absurd, but this is more fanciful." Jesse Hassenger from TheWrap comments "It will be a strange and welcome development if this newest season produces more experiments like "The Special One.""
