= Boxed In (Beavis and Butt-Head) =

- Beavis and Butt-Head episode
- Episode no.: Season 9 Episode 3
- Directed by: Michael A. Zimmerman
- Written by: Moss Perricone
- Production code: 102A
- Original air date: August 4, 2022

Episode chronology
← Previous "The Special One"	Next → "Beekeepers"

"Boxed In" is the third episode of season 9 and 223rd episode overall of the American animated television series Beavis and Butt-Head. It is the third episode of the 2022 revival of the show, debuting on Paramount+ on August 4, 2022, along with the episodes "Escape Room", "The Special One", and "Beekeepers", the latter of which is this episode's sister episode.

== Plot ==
During Mr. Van Driessen's class, Beavis interrupts by activating a power drill repeatedly, causing it to be confiscated. In attempt to recover the drill, Beavis and Butt-Head hide inside a cardboard box, with plans to grab the drill after school is closed for the day. Shortly after the duo hide themselves in the box, the school janitor, not noticing them, tapes the box shut, and stacks other boxes on top of it. After being taken to the school's basement with the other boxes, Beavis and Butt-Head try to escape, before realizing they are trapped. After arguing with each other, they realize they only have a limited amount of oxygen, Butt-Head then starts breathing rapidly in an attempt to steal all of Beavis' oxygen, they remain trapped in the box hours later, when they attempt to kick each other when arguing more; Beavis accidentally kicks a hole in the box, but they are then crushed by the other boxes. Sometime later, Mr. Van Driessen accidentally finds them in the box after declaring them as missing; Beavis grabs the drill from his desk and starts drilling his desk and chalkboard, while Mr. Van Driessen sighs.

== Featured videos ==
- Gibi ASMR – "Gibi-Slow & Gentle-ASMR" from YouTube
- CNCO – "Por Amarte Así"

== Reception ==
Reviewing this and the rest of the first four episodes of the season, Brittany Vincent of IGN stated, "..the fact that they're still funny is a miracle, when so many factors could have gone wrong with this revival. It's not easy to retain a series' humor and spirit when adapting it for a new audience, but these new stories land fantastically, even when some of the jokes tend to get a little long in the tooth." Carys Anderson at Consequence described the episode as "a story that excels at the type of animated physical comedy such a dumb show needs." Brittany Frederick from Comic Book Resources declared it as the best of the revival's first four episodes, but was disappointed in how "the writers completely missed a perfect self-reference that would have made the episode an immediate classic."
