= Supersize Me (Beavis and Butt-Head) =

- Beavis and Butt-Head episode
- Butt-Head stuffs French fries into his mouth, mimicking the poster for Super Size Me
- Episode no.: Season 8 Episode 7
- Directed by: Geoffrey Johnson
- Written by: John Altschuler & Dave Krinsky
- Production code: 807
- Original air date: November 17, 2011

Episode chronology
| ← Previous "Holy Cornholio" | Next → "Bathroom Break" |

"Supersize Me" is the seventh episode of season 8 and 207th episode overall of the American animated television series Beavis and Butt-Head. It aired on MTV on November 17, 2011, along with "Bathroom Break".

== Plot ==
Beavis and Butt-Head are watching an award show on TV, where they see Morgan Spurlock of Super Size Me fame on the red carpet with a woman in tow. After Butt-Head explains to Beavis that Spurlock is famous only because he ate nothing but fast food for a whole month, the two decide to do the same thing in the hopes of getting fame and women. The boys then start their plans by eating obscene amounts of fast food at Burger World for days and then volunteering to work a shift for their manager, who allows them free food in exchange. The boys then quickly grab as much food as they can before leaving. The boys continue to gorge while in school until Mr. Van Driessen tells them that food is banned in class. After Butt-Head quickly sways Van Driessen's opinion by explaining that they are eating for 30 days "like that Sherlock dude", Van Driessen assumes that the boys are doing this in order to showcase the dangers of teenage obesity, to which he allows them to continue eating in class and even gets two of the boys' classmates to make a video documentary as their semester service project. After Beavis and Butt-Head both gain a large amount of weight, their video reaches Burger World headquarters, who decide to give Beavis and Butt-Head all-you-can-eat coupons for Taco Yummo, whose headquarters see another video and provide gift cards to Wiener Shack. The episode ends with the Taco Yummo boardroom staff rushing out to get Beavis and Butt-Head away from their restaurant as the boys are seen on TV, declaring that "Teen obesity kicks ass!".

== Featured videos ==
- A clip from Teen Cribs
- A clip from Jersey Shore

== Reception ==
IGN rated the episode a 7/10, commenting "The short is pretty darn funny, especially when Beavis and Butt-head find themselves the subject of their own documentary – an idea Mr. Van Driessen comes up with. Like many of the other shorts, the climax isn't quite as funny as the buildup, but watching B&B get fat and lurch around a fast food restaurant proves rather amusing. Now, I can't help but wonder how they end up losing the weight. Perhaps they just popped in the music video for 'It's So Cold in the D' (from last week's ep.) and danced the fat away".

For The A.V. Club, Kenny Herzog gave the episode and its successor an A−, writing that they "make a great tandem, collectively striking just the right chords of satire, idiocy, classic B And B-isms and a little bit of Judge’s blackened anger". He praised how Mr. Van Driessen became "a patsy once again, representing a nation of apologist intellectuals who make it possible for exploiters like Spurlock to pass as righteous crusaders", and also approved of a shot of Butt-Head with his face full of fries, similar to the documentary's poster.
