= Holy Cornholio =

- Beavis and Butt-Head episode
- Beavis as Cornholio with a cut mark in each of his hands resembling stigmata.
- Episode no.: Season 8 Episode 6
- Directed by: Ilya Skorupsky (Part One); Tony Kluck (Part Two)
- Written by: Kristofor Brown
- Production code: 806
- Original air date: November 10, 2011

Episode chronology
← Previous "Drones"	Next → "Supersize Me"

"Holy Cornholio" is the sixth episode of season 8 and 206th episode overall of the American animated television series Beavis and Butt-Head. It is an extended episode. It aired on MTV on November 10, 2011, along with "Drones", another extended episode.

== Plot ==
Beavis and Butt-Head are seen in Mr. Stevenson's garage, playing with his tools. After Stewart says not to play with his dad's tools, they ignore him and Beavis starts screwing a screw into an action figure's butt. Beavis suddenly starts bleeding after unknowingly screwing it into his own hand. Butt-Head tries to remove it with a drill, but he accidentally tightens the screw, penetrating Beavis' other hand as well. Stewart tells him to take Beavis to the hospital.

At the hospital, Beavis gets the action figure and the screw removed from his hands. Beavis is given painkillers, but against the doctor's advice he takes several at once and he transforms into his alter-ego, The Great Cornholio (or simply Cornholio). A group of cultists in the hospital notice that Cornholio speaks in tongues and has a hole in each of his hands and mistakes them for stigmata, thinking he is the new messiah. After taking Cornholio and Butt-Head to a cult meeting, Cornholio demands large quantities of toilet paper.

The cult members start to look wherever they can for toilet paper for Cornholio. Cornholio addresses the cult members until the pills wear off and he becomes Beavis again. The duo decide that the place sucks and they leave without realizing that they had a chance of having sex with the women there.

The next day, the cult members come to the duo's house and Beavis tells them that Stewart is now the beloved and the duo are oblivious to the fact that they are actually taking Stewart for sex, much to his delight.

== Featured videos ==
- A clip from Jersey Shore
- T-Baby – "It's So Cold in the D"
- Cage the Elephant – "In One Ear"
- Two clips from Teen Mom

== Reception ==
The episode was seen by 1,798,000 viewers in its initial airing.

IGN comments that "Holy Cornholio" is a great episode, especially for longtime fans and says it has "pretty solid gags", also commenting that its plot is fresh enough that Cornholio's return isn't a retread. They include that the episode may make those who were on the fence with the episodes a fan again. The A.V. Club gave the episode a B, calling it "Beavis and Butt-Head at its best". CraveOnline said the episode didn't feel complete and that "there was a lot of potential for Beavis as an accidental cult leader that seemed like it was squandered".
