= The Rat (Beavis and Butt-Head) =

- Beavis and Butt-Head episode
- Beavis and Butt-Head serve a customer with the rat on the tray.
- Episode no.: Season 8 Episode 9
- Directed by: Ted Stearn
- Written by: Kristofor Brown
- Production code: 809
- Original air date: December 1, 2011

Episode chronology
← Previous "Bathroom Break"	Next → "Spill"

"The Rat" is the second episode of Season 8 and 209th episode overall of the American animated television series Beavis and Butt-Head. It aired on MTV on December 1, 2011.

== Plot ==
Beavis and Butt-Head wake up after napping on the couch and find a rat causing havoc in their house and eating their nachos. They go to the hardware store to get a mousetrap, and find it difficult to set it up, constantly trapping their own fingers in it. Eventually they set it with a corn chip as bait and return to the couch. Butt-Head sends Beavis to check on the trap, but Beavis falls for the bait and traps himself again. Later, they hear a noise in the kitchen and find the rat trapped, but still alive. Butt-head sweeps the rat towards Beavis, who accidentally releases it from the trap. The rat is grateful and follows Beavis in admiration. The pair go to work at Burger World, with the rat in tow. Beavis lets the rat work in the kitchen with him, and takes it out on the tray when a woman orders. She is shocked and calls the manager, who is angry with Beavis and Butt-Head. As the rat went missing while they were being told off, they search around for it. Later, it turns out that the rat was pregnant and it gives birth to a litter of babies in the restaurant, possibly leading to an infestation.

== Production ==
The animated produced by Film Roman, AKOM and Nelson Shin.

== Reception ==
R.L. Shafer of IGN rated the episode a 8.5/10 in a joint review with its successor. He praised its simple premise and called the scene where they set the trap "comedy gold". Although he wished that the scene in Burger World had lasted longer, and wrote that it "ends on a fun, ironic note". On the video reviews, he called their analysis of "White Nights" "[not] exactly sharp, just laugh-out-loud funny", as they gave their idea that female singers get outlandish videos directed by male directors who want to have sexual intercourse with them. However, their commentary on "My Machines" was deemed to be one in which "the laughs aren't as prevalent"

In a combined review for The A.V. Club, Kenny Herzog gave the episode and its three successors a B+, likening it to Seinfeld and The Three Stooges. He wrote that it "has a warped realism, and is a nearly perfect little vignette about nothing".
