= Tech Support (Beavis and Butt-Head) =

- Beavis and Butt-Head episode
- Beavis and Butt-Head about to obtain pornography on the computer.
- Episode no.: Season 8 Episode 4
- Directed by: Ted Stearn
- Written by: Andy Rheingold & Scott Sonneborn
- Production code: 804
- Original air date: November 3, 2011

Episode chronology
← Previous "Daughter's Hand"	Next → "Drones"

"Tech Support" is the fourth episode of season 8 and 204th episode overall of the American animated television series Beavis and Butt-Head. It aired alongside "Daughter's Hand" on November 3, 2011 on MTV.

== Plot ==
Beavis and Butt-Head walk to an abandoned drive-in to find out that it has been replaced with a computer technical support office, where Butt-Head asks one of the office workers what has happened to the abandoned drive-in. Thinking that they're new employees, the technical support worker named Hamid (a Middle Eastern man with a thick accent) gets Beavis and Butt-Head to sit down and work at the two vacant workstations inside his cubicle. However, the duo tries to browse the internet for pornography while mishandling the technical support calls they get, to which Hamid complains to his manager about their antics. While talking to Hamid, the manager nonetheless thinks the duo is doing their job correctly and encourages him to act like them. As a result, Hamid starts to imitate Beavis and Butt-Head, with the duo starting out being impressed with his imitation. Eventually, the duo stops finding him funny and while Hamid is talking to a customer who is having problems with a computer at a power plant, Butt-Head tells Hamid to tell him to "butt plug his computer". Hamid misunderstands him and instead tells him to unplug the computer, while Butt-Head meanwhile finally obtains a porn site called "Lonely Nasty Housewives". As the girl in the website is about to strip, the power goes out. The duo, however, thinks the computer is broken and unplugs it in order to get it fixed. As they walk out, two men in a truck (Ross and Harlan) spot them and think that they are looting due to the power outage, then drive through the window of the building and begin looting. Butt-Head calls the place cool again.

== Featured videos ==
- Katy Perry – "Firework"

== Production ==
Mike Judge mentioned that he did not want to force "all the modern stuff on them" and thus, while the episode is about technology, it does not feature cell phones, Facebook or Twitter.

== Reception ==
The episode was seen by 2,071,000 viewers in its initial airing.

IGN calls the plot of the episode a "great setup" and commented how Hamid trying to imitate the duo was "pretty funny". It also says the best gag is where Beavis is talking with a young woman who is a single mom. The A.V. Club graded the episode a B+, commenting that "it's frankly pretty incredible that MTV lets Judge get away with this stuff" and notes that upcoming episodes should be "even more consistently uproarious". CraveOnline comments that the episode has an "even crazier premise" than "Daughter's Hand".
