= Daughter's Hand =

- Beavis and Butt-Head episode
- Victoria's dad attacking Beavis and Butt-Head after continually asking for her "hand".
- Episode no.: Season 8 Episode 3
- Directed by: Ilya Skorupsky
- Written by: Jeff Goldstone
- Production code: 803
- Original air date: November 3, 2011

Episode chronology
← Previous "Crying"	Next → "Tech Support"

"Daughter's Hand" is the third episode of season 8 and 203rd episode overall of the American animated television series Beavis and Butt-Head. It aired alongside "Tech Support" on November 3, 2011 on MTV.

== Plot ==
Beavis and Butt-Head watch a black-and-white TV show in which one of the characters asks for the hand of someone's daughter. Beavis and Butt-Head do not understand that this meant that he wanted to marry her, and they get the idea to ask someone for his daughter's "hand". They go to a house where a girl named Victoria lives and asks her dad for her "hand", but he says that she is a few years older than them and already has a boyfriend. Beavis and Butt-Head, not understanding, ask him again and the man responds by saying that they would have to wait a long time if they want a chance with his daughter. After he ends the conversation and closes the door, the duo sits on the sidewalk, thinking that the man meant they only had to wait for hours or days. Their neighbor, Tom Anderson, is close by in his yard raking leaves and is interrupted by the duo's conversation. Butt-Head says that they are waiting to have Victoria's "hand" and Mr. Anderson says to them that only one of them can have her "hand", thinking that she is still single and not realizing what they really mean, adding that they should just get up and get her "hand". The duo then goes back to the man's door to ask him for his daughter's "hand" yet again, but this time he says that he does not think she would want to date or marry either one of them. After they repeat the request, the man begins to realize that what they want his daughter to do. Enraged, the man attacks Beavis and Butt-Head. The two are still asking for her hand. Suddenly, Mr. Anderson intervenes and tells the man to get his hands off of them, and the neighbor tells him to shut up and get lost. They start attacking each other after Mr. Anderson hits him on the head with his rake, which leads the neighbor to knock Anderson to the ground and then punch him numerous times in the face. During the fight, Beavis and Butt-Head realize that they have "their own hands" to use and don't need Victoria, or any other woman, to satisfy their needs.

== Featured videos ==
- A clip from 16 and Pregnant
- A clip from True Life episode "I Have a Paranormal Ability" (12/13/2010)

== Reception ==
The episode was seen by 2,071,000 viewers in its initial airing.

IGN says the episode is funny, but adds that "though not as out-and-out hilarious as the first short from episode one", noting that they wish the girl would turn out to be Daria. The A.V. Club graded the episode a B+, commenting that "it's frankly pretty incredible that MTV lets Judge get away with this stuff" and notes that upcoming episodes should be "even more consistently uproarious". CraveOnline praises the episode for its simplistic premise and commented that it is amusing to watch them trying to act like gentlemen without understanding what they were trying to do.
