= T-Baby =

T-Baby may refer to:

- LaTonya Myles, American rapper known for her song "It's So Cold in the D"
- "T-Baby", a 2013 song by Lizzo from Lizzobangers
