= Drones (Beavis and Butt-Head) =

- Beavis and Butt-Head episode
- Beavis and Butt-Head fighting over the drone controller
- Episode no.: Season 8 Episode 5
- Directed by: Bernard Derriman (Part One); Ilya Skorupsky (Part Two)
- Written by: Sivert Glarum & Michael Jamin
- Production code: 805
- Original air date: November 10, 2011

Episode chronology
← Previous "Tech Support"	Next → "Holy Cornholio"

"Drones" is the fifth episode of season 8 and 205th episode overall of the American animated television series Beavis and Butt-Head. It is an extended episode. It aired on MTV on November 10, 2011, along with "Holy Cornholio", another extended episode.

== Plot ==
Beavis and Butt-Head are on a class field trip to a military base (but only half of the class is there because the school's guidance counselor felt the other students were better served by visiting Hewlett-Packard) where their teacher, Mr. Van Driessen (conducting the trip under protest), tries to present a military career in non-violent and educational terms only to be cheerfully countered by an Army officer who notes the virtues of pre-emptive strikes and bluntly says that juvenile delinquents make the best warriors.

Beavis and Butt-Head have to use a bathroom, so they go look for one. Meanwhile, a lazy trainee leaves the Drone Control Room to get some birthday cake. Shortly thereafter, the duo wander into the Drone Control Room, which they at first thought was a bathroom when they read it as "Drain Central". At the pilot seats, the duo thinks they are playing Grand Theft Auto: San Andreas when they are actually controlling drone planes in Afghanistan (the local villagers are speaking Dari). They start wreaking havoc around the city (Butt-Head) and in Afghanistan (Beavis) while looking for prostitutes, still thinking they are playing. They manage to scare civilians around the world and destroy some property.

Not succeeding in finding prostitutes, they eventually get bored and leave the Drone Control Room after which a drone crashes into and destroys the Highland High school bus and two other drones crash into a foreign field. The lazy drone trainee, whose return to his job was delayed when he decided to get some ice cream to go with his cake, is arrested for the destruction. While he's being beaten up and taken away in handcuffs by the military, Beavis and Butt-Head decide to finish their day by enjoying what is left of the birthday treats.

== Featured videos ==
- Deadmau5 featuring Rob Swire – "Ghosts 'n' Stuff"
- MGMT – "It's Working"
- Two clips from Jersey Shore
- Benny Benassi – "Satisfaction"

== Reception ==
The episode was seen by 1,554,000 viewers in its initial airing.

IGN rated the episode a 7.5/10, commenting "While not a perfect episode, 'Drones' did have me laughing out loud quite often", and commented that the best element of the story is when Mr. Van Driessen learns about how the Army works. The A.V. Club graded the episode a B, comparing it to the satire that the show South Park has in their episodes and calls it "heavy, heady stuff". They also comment on the line "pee all I can pee", saying "yet another notch in Judge and his writers".
