= Judgmental Films =

American film and television production company

- Formerly: Inbred Jed’s Homemade Cartoons (1991–1992); Judgemental Films (1991–2010)
- Type: Private
- Industry: Film; Television
- Founded: January 2, 1991; 35 years ago
- Founder: Mike Judge
- Headquarters: United States
- Products: Beavis and Butt-Head; King of the Hill; The Goode Family; Silicon Valley

Judgmental Films (stylized as judgmental films), formerly known as Inbred Jed’s Homemade Cartoons and Judgemental Films, is an American film and television production company founded by Texan animator/film director Mike Judge on January 2, 1991. The company is best known for producing Beavis and Butt-Head and King of the Hill, as well as The Goode Family, Silicon Valley, and Mike Judge Presents: Tales from the Tour Bus.

== Filmography ==
=== Television series ===
==== Animated ====
Title	Genre	Premiere	Seasons	Runtime	Status
Beavis and Butt-Head	Satire	March 8, 1993	11 seasons, 300 episodes	5–11 min	Renewed
King of the Hill	Slice of life sitcom	January 12, 1997	14 seasons, 269 episodes	20–22 min	Renewed
The Goode Family	Comedy	May 27, 2009	1 season, 13 episodes	22 min	Ended
Mike Judge Presents: Tales from the Tour Bus	Documentary comedy	September 22, 2017	2 seasons, 16 episodes	24–29 min	Ended

==== Live-action ====
Title	Genre	Premiere	Seasons	Runtime	Status
Silicon Valley	Comedy	April 6, 2014	6 seasons, 53 episodes	28–47 min	Ended

=== Feature films ===
==== Animated ====
Title	Genre	Release date	Runtime	Distributor
Beavis and Butt-Head Do America	Adult animation comedy	December 20, 1996	81 min	Paramount Pictures
Beavis and Butt-Head Do the Universe	Adult animation comedy	June 23, 2022	86 min	Paramount+

==== Live-action ====
Title	Genre	Release date	Runtime	Distributor
Office Space	Comedy	February 19, 1999	89 min	20th Century Fox
Idiocracy	Science fiction comedy	September 1, 2006	84 min	20th Century Fox
Extract	Comedy	September 4, 2009	92 min	Miramax Films

=== Other projects ===
==== Short films ====
Title	Genre	Release date	Runtime	Distributor
The Honky Problem	Comedy	1991	1 min 49 seconds	Spike and Mike's Festival of Animation
Frog Baseball	Comedy	September 22, 1992	2 min	Liquid Television
Peace Love & Understanding	Comedy	November 17, 1992	4 min	Liquid Television
Milton	Comedy	1991	2 min	Liquid Television

==== Showcases ====
Title	Release dates	Notes
The Animation Show	2003; 2005; 2007; 2008	Animation showcase hosted by Judge & Don Hertzfeldt.

==== Music videos ====
Title	Release date	Notes
The Wind	July 3, 2012	

== See also ==
- Bandera Entertainment
