= Bathroom Break =

- Beavis and Butt-Head episode
- The manager scolds Beavis and Butt-Head for taking too long, being in the bathroom.
- Episode no.: Season 8 Episode 8
- Directed by: Geoffrey Johnson
- Written by: Greg Grabianski
- Production code: 808
- Original air date: November 17, 2011

Episode chronology
← Previous "Supersize Me"	Next → "The Rat"

"Bathroom Break" is the eighth episode of Season 8 and 208th episode overall of the American animated television series Beavis and Butt-Head. It aired on MTV on November 17, 2011, after "Supersize Me".

== Plot ==
Beavis and Butt-Head are working at Burger World when the latter returns from the bathroom and realizes that he has been paid to defecate. Beavis finds this to be a genius discovery, and joins him in the bathroom, while the queue to be served grows longer and longer. The manager is upset and drags them out of the bathroom. However, a labor lawyer in the queue tells the manager that it is illegal to limit his employees' bathroom break. Beavis and Butt-Head return to slack off in the bathroom, and the manager has to serve the impatient queue. The manager leaves the restaurant and hides behind a secluded wall to urinate, but the police park right next to him and arrest him for public urination. As he turns to face them without doing up his zipper, he is also arrested for indecent exposure.

== Featured videos ==
- Edward Sharpe and the Magnetic Zeros – "Kisses over Babylon"

== Reception ==
R. L. Shafer of IGN rated the episode a 7/10 in a joint review with its predecessor. He deemed the episode "only moderately funny, save for the hilarious final image of Beavis and Butt-Head lounging in the bathroom", and commented how he only found one line funny in their music video review. He concluded that it was "funny and filled with nostalgia, but not quite as consistent as the first three episodes".

For The A.V. Club, Kenny Herzog gave the episode and its predecessor an A−, writing that they "make a great tandem, collectively striking just the right chords of satire, idiocy, classic B And B-isms and a little bit of Judge’s blackened anger" and praising their commentary on the music video.
