= Beavis and Butt-Head Do the Universe =

2022 animated film

- Release poster
- Directed by: John Rice; Albert Calleros
- Screenplay by: Mike Judge; Lew Morton; Guy Maxtone-Graham; Ian Maxtone-Graham
- Story by: Mike Judge; Guy Maxtone-Graham; Ian Maxtone-Graham
- Based on: Beavis and Butt-Head by Mike Judge
- Produced by: Matthew Mahoney
- Starring: Mike Judge; Gary Cole; Nat Faxon; Chi McBride; Andrea Savage
- Edited by: Phil Davis; Robert James Ashe; Mike Mendez
- Music by: John Frizzell
- Production companies: MTV Entertainment Studios; MTV Animation; Judgmental Films; Titmouse; 3 Arts Entertainment
- Distributed by: Paramount+
- Release date: June 23, 2022
- Running time: 87 minutes
- Country: United States
- Language: English

Beavis and Butt-Head Do the Universe is a 2022 American adult animated science fiction comedy film directed by John Rice and Albert Calleros and written by Mike Judge, Lew Morton, Guy Maxtone-Graham and Ian Maxtone-Graham. It is the second film based on the animated television series Beavis and Butt-Head after Beavis and Butt-Head Do America (1996). The film follows teenage delinquents Beavis and Butt-Head who are transported 24 years from 1998 to 2022, encounter parallel-universe versions of themselves and are hunted by the US government.

The film was announced in February 2021. The production was conducted remotely via Zoom conferencing due to the COVID-19 pandemic. The film was released on the streaming service Paramount+ on June 23, 2022, to acclaim from critics.

== Plot ==
In Highland, Texas, in 1998, Beavis and Butt-Head accidentally burn down their high school science fair. Believing they are at-risk youth, a judge sends them to space camp at the Johnson Space Center, where they become engrossed in a docking simulator. Impressed, the NASA astronaut Captain Serena Ryan invites them to train as astronauts, which they mistake as an offer for sex. They undergo training and board the Space Shuttle Endeavour to study a micro black hole.

In space, Beavis and Butt-Head create a catastrophe, accidentally destroying the shuttle and the Mir space station. When Serena volunteers to sacrifice herself, they mistake this for another offer of sex. They put on their spacesuits, and watch Serena through a window as she prepares to change. Enraged, Serena uses the shuttle controls to fling them into space, where they are sucked into the black hole.

The boys emerge in Galveston in 2022. The Pentagon detects their arrival and begins tracking them; Serena, now governor of Texas, vows to kill them to cover up her attempted murder. The boys meet intelligent versions of themselves from another universe, Smart Beavis and Smart Butt-Head, who explain that they have two days to enter a portal on top of Mount Everest to prevent the destruction of the multiverse.

Beavis and Butt-Head acquire an iPhone and accidentally activate Siri, which they mistake for Serena; Beavis develops feelings for her. When Siri offers to set up their smart home, they believe Serena is waiting for them in Highland. After Beavis becomes trapped in a port-a-potty, he and Butt-Head are transported to a university. Smart Beavis and Smart Butt-Head urge them to enter the portal, which they have moved nearby, but instead they wander into a gender studies class, where the professor lectures them on white privilege. Taking this to mean they have the right to do whatever they want, they steal a police car and are arrested. In jail, Beavis takes pills given to him by an inmate, transforms into his hyperactive alter ego Cornholio, and incites an uprising. Discovering that the boys seemingly died in 1998, the warden decides that they are angels and releases them.

The boys arrive home, expecting to find Serena, but find it has been placed for sale. They blame each other and separate, but are quickly abducted by government officials. Serena's downtrodden lieutenant, Jim Hartson, covertly frees the boys, saying he knows what Serena did to them. Smart Beavis and Butt-Head urge them to enter the portal, but the boys ignore them.

All parties arrive at Beavis and Butt-Head's house. As Serena is about to shoot them, she realizes they are not her enemies, only foolish teenagers. Smart Beavis and Smart Butt-Head urge Beavis and Butt-Head to enter the portal, but Hartson is accidentally sucked in instead, closing the rift and saving the multiverse. Smart Beavis and Smart Butt-Head acknowledge that possibly anything could have worked ("We could have thrown a brick in there") and they were making it more complicated by saying only Beavis and Butt-Head could stop the portal, and acknowledge that while they are the smartest versions they are still not the brightest in existence. As Beavis attempts to express his love to Serena, Smart Beavis interrupts and offers to show her the cosmos; she leaves with him and Smart Butt-Head. In exchange for their silence, the government gives Beavis and Butt-Head their home back in its original condition. In another universe, the assembled alternative Beavises and Butt-Heads applaud Smart Beavis for becoming the first Beavis to have sex, although Serena does not return his calls.

== Voice cast ==
- Mike Judge as Beavis and Butt-Head, David Van Driessen, Principal McVicker, Smart Beavis, Smart Butt-Head, Old Beavis, Old Butt-Head, Empress Beavis, Emperor Butt-Head
- Gary Cole as Mattison
- Nat Faxon as Jim Hartson
- Chi McBride as Judge, Metcalf
- Andrea Savage as Serena Ryan
- Carlos Alazraqui as Flight Specialist Valdivia
- Susan Bennett as Siri
- Mary Birdsong as Reporter
- Greg Chun as Bus Driver
- Phil Davis as Federal Whistleblower Hotline Operator
- Chris Diamantopoulos as Police Officer, Prisoners, Corrections Officers
- Zehra Fazal as Butt-Head Fantasy Woman #1
- Ashley Gardner as Anita Ross
- David Herman as German Tourist, Gage, Jail Warden
- Brian Huskey as Richard Wack
- Toby Huss as Todd Ianuzzi
- Phil LaMarr as Flight Specialist Jackson, NSA Agents, Police Officer
- Whitney Martin as Disrespect Prisoner
- Mike Massimino as Launch Control Voice
- Jim Meskimen as NASA Director Ogilvie, Extraction Team Leader, Prisoners
- Tig Notaro as Professor
- Toks Olagundoye as Campaign Aide, Butt-Head Fantasy Women #2 & 3, & Female Students
- Jimmy O. Yang as Flight Specialist Jung, Jeff
- Stephen Root as Jail Tattoo Artist
- Martin Starr as Corrections Officer, Ball-kicking Biker
- Tru Valentino as McCabe, Head Corrections Officer

Daria Morgendorffer, Principal McVicker, Tom Anderson, Stewart Stevenson, Mrs Stevenson and Coach Buzzcut make cameo appearances, most of them silent.

== Production ==
=== Development ===
In 2008, Mike Judge stated, "I like to keep the door open on Beavis and Butt-Head, because it's my favorite thing that I've ever done. It's the thing I'm most proud of." However, he stated his reservations regarding the "year and a half [to] two and a half years" that it would take "to do that right," saying that a revival project "comes up every three years." In 2009, while promoting his film Extract, Judge said he would like to see the characters on the big screen again, and that "I kind of think of them as being either 15 or in their 60s. ... I wouldn't mind doing something with them as these two dirty old men sitting on the couch."

In March 2018, Judge told Rotten Tomatoes that the idea of doing a second Beavis and Butt-Head movie had been brought up two months prior, saying "It's just a matter of coming up with an idea that feels like it's worth doing." In July 2019, Judge again reiterated interest in a potential movie, stating, "I've got some ideas. I think it would have to be something that makes it relevant today. I think I might've figured out a way to do that." He further stated that he would probably direct it.

In February 2021, it was announced that a new Beavis and Butt-Head movie was in production for Paramount+, with Judge on board. The news came following the announcement of a revival series the year prior, which was originally set to air on Comedy Central. Originally, Paramount executives wanted a live-action Beavis and Butt-Head movie, with Judge holding auditions over Zoom for the project before eventually talking the company into doing an animated movie instead to reestablish the characters first, with a live-action movie still a possibility. In January 2022, Judge tweeted drawings of older versions of Beavis and Butt-Head. A month later, the film's title was revealed as Beavis and Butt-Head Do the Universe. John Frizzell, who composed Do America, returned to compose the score. The entire production was conducted remotely via Zoom conferencing due to the COVID-19 pandemic.

=== Animation ===
While the series and the first film Do America were hand-drawn animated by Rough Draft Studios, animation services for Do the Universe were provided by Titmouse, Inc in Los Angeles, Snipple Animation Studios in the Philippines, and Inspidea in Malaysia using Adobe Animate, making it the first official Beavis and Butt-Head animation to be done digitally. Some layouts were handled by Studio Moshi in Melbourne and Ink Animation in Singapore.

== Release ==
The film's trailer was released on June 2, 2022. A sneak peek debuted three days later, at the MTV Movie and TV Awards. Beavis and Butt-Head Do the Universe was released on Paramount+ on June 23, 2022, and a day later on the UK version of the service.

The soundtrack was released digitally on July 8, 2022, from Paramount Music.

A DVD release of the film along with Season 9 was originally planned for a March 2023 release but was eventually cancelled for unknown reasons.

== Reception ==
On the review aggregator website Rotten Tomatoes, 97% of 64 critics' reviews are positive, with an average rating of 7.2/10. The website's consensus reads: "Fart-knockers beware: Beavis and Butthead are back, and they're just as stupidly hilarious (or hilariously stupid?) as ever." On Metacritic, the film has a weighted average score of 70 out of 100, based on 19 critics, indicating "generally favorable" reviews. Andy Kelly of The Gamer complimented the movie as one of the best movies of the year and a revival done well of which he also noted "Beavis and Butt-Head Do the Universe is a fine return to form for these characters—and for Mike Judge, whose distinctive approach to comedy I've dearly missed". Sol Harris of Starburst Magazine gave the movie 4 out of 5 stars of which he wrote "Beavis and Butt-Head Do the Universe is a completely worthy follow-up to Do America and, frankly, a frontrunner for the title of funniest movie of 2022."
