= Brad Dharma =

MTV animated series

Brad Dharma, fully titled Brad Dharma, Psychedelic Detective is an animated series that appeared as part of the third season of Liquid Television on MTV in 1994. The segments were created by John Moynihan and Greg Pair, based on Moynihan's original comic strips.

Dharma, voiced by Dick Rodstein, is a private detective who lived in Timbuktu sometime in the near future. The city is very heavily populated (with a population of 30 million people) and ruled by an elite called the "Hipster Elders". Dharma is depicted as a trench coat- and fedora-wearing man with long, stringy hair and eyes that appear, like Little Orphan Annie's, to have no pupils. He seems to have psychic abilities. The plot line pits Dharma against corrupt public officials (including what appears to be the French Foreign Legion) and a mysterious organization called The Beelzebub Brotherhood.
