= Frog Baseball =

1992 film by Mike Judge

- Screenshot from the film showing Butt-Head killing the frog
- Written by: Mike Judge
- Directed by: Mike Judge
- Starring: Mike Judge
- Music by: Mike Judge
- Country of origin: United States
- Original language: English

Production
- Executive producers: Mike Judge; Jake Eberts; John A. Davis; Keith Alcorn
- Producer: Spike Decker
- Editor: Doug Bryan
- Running time: 2 minutes
- Production companies: Inbred Jed's Homemade Cartoons; Mellow Madness Productions; DNA Productions

Original release
- Release: September 22, 1992

Related
- Peace, Love and Understanding

Frog Baseball is an animated short film created by Mike Judge in 1992, which marks the first appearance of the Beavis and Butt-Head characters. It premiered in The Sick and Twisted Festival of Animation.

== Plot ==
The short starts out with a title card that says, "Inbred Jed's Homemade Cartoons", with the character of Inbred Jed staring at the camera and cackling. Two teenagers by the name of Beavis and Butt-Head are shown switching channels on their TV, watching TV commercials and laughing at a Suzanne Somers ThighMaster commercial. Later, while blowing up insects with firecrackers in a field, Beavis and Butt-Head spot a frog and exclaim "frog baseball!"; they then proceed to play baseball with the frog. After they kill the frog, they see a poodle and charge after the dog with a baseball bat, exclaiming "dog baseball!" The credits roll as the viewer hears the duo hit the poodle with a bat and the poodle yelping in pain (not seen).

== DVD ==
Frog Baseball is available on Disc 3 of Volume 3 of The Mike Judge Collection and on the Mike Judge's Most Wanted DVD as a special feature. It is also slightly edited from the MTV broadcast and the Liquid TV version. It is more on par with the Spike & Mike's Sick and Twisted Festival of Animation airing. The end title card that showed a still from the cartoon in which Butt-head's bat made contact with Beavis' head and reads "No animals were harmed in the making of this film... except for Beavis" is removed from the DVD version. It instead shows the original disclaimer "No animals were harmed in the making of this film" leaving out the Beavis part, like in the Liquid TV version and the MTV TV version.

== Cultural references ==
The duo play Black Sabbath's "Iron Man" and Deep Purple's "Smoke on the Water" on air guitar.

The short, along with the episode "Held Back", was also mentioned in the Beavis and Butt-Head episode "Snitchers", the 20th episode of the 8th season. The way the duo scream "FROG BASEBALL!" in the short was also used in a music video commentary in "Give Blood".
