= Liquid Television =

Animation showcase

- Title card from 1991 to 1995
- Created by: Japhet Asher
- Composer: Mark Mothersbaugh
- Country of origin: United States
- Original language: English
- No. of seasons: 4
- No. of episodes: 27

Production
- Executive producers: Japhet Asher; Chris McCarthy; John Hays; Phil Robinson; Jeff Fino; Eli Noyes; Kit Laybourne; Samir Shah
- Running time: 30 minutes
- Production companies: Colossal Pictures; MTV Networks; BIG Pictures; Noyes & Laybourne Enterprises; BBC (1991–1992)

Original release
- Network: MTV
- Release: June 2, 1991 – January 1, 1995

Related
- Beavis and Butt-Head; Æon Flux

Liquid Television is an animation showcase broadcast on MTV from 1991 to 1995. It launched several high-profile original cartoons, including Beavis and Butt-Head and Æon Flux. Other recurring segments include "The Art School Girls of Doom", The Specialists, and Brad Dharma: Psychedelic Detective. Independent animators and artists created most of the material specifically for the show, and some previously produced segments were compiled from festivals such as Spike and Mike's Festival of Animation.

The first season of Liquid Television also aired on BBC Two in co-production with MTV. Ultimately, MTV commissioned three seasons of the show, produced by Colossal Pictures. The show was eventually succeeded by Cartoon Sushi. Mark Mothersbaugh composed the theme music.

The show was broadcast in Canada on MuchMusic, in Asia on Channel V, in Australia on SBS and in New Zealand on TV3.

== History ==
Many animation pieces were adapted from Art Spiegelman's comic compilation, RAW. RAW features underground cartoonists such as Mark Beyer, Richard Sala, and Peter Bagge. In particular, Dog-Boy by Charles Burns was based on the artist's series from RAW.

Due to the extensive use of licensed music throughout the series (many episodes begin with a contemporary music video being "liquified"), full episodes of Liquid Television have not been broadcast since their original run. Selected segments from the series, including the debut of Æon Flux, were released on two VHS tapes in the late 1990s as The Best of Liquid Television. (Note: These have been out of print.) A collection volume, Wet Shorts (The Best of Liquid Television), with the content of the two VHS tapes, was released on DVD in 1997.

== Credits ==
1. Japhet Asher – Executive Producer/Creative Director
2. Prudence Fenton – Executive Producer/Story Editor
3. Mark Mothersbaugh – Composer, Theme Music
4. XAOS Inc. – Title Sequences, Liquid Lips, Liquid Eyes, End Credits Bed
5. A BIG Pictures & Noyes & Laybourne Collaboration
6. Produced by (Colossal) Pictures for MTV & BBC-TV

== Series overview ==
Season	Episodes	Originally released	
Season	Episodes	First released	Last released
1	6	June 2, 1991	June 30, 1991
2	10	September 24, 1992	December 3, 1992
3	6	December 31, 1993	January 1, 1995
4	5	May 15, 2014	June 12, 2014

== Episodes ==
=== Season 1 (1991) ===
No.	Original air date	Summary
1	June 2, 1991	1. Open: Robert Palmer "Addicted to Love"; 2. Soap Opera "A Steamy Scene"; 3. Buzz Box; 4. Grinning Evil Death; 5. Æon Flux; 6. Invisible Hands (by Richard Sala); 7. Lea Press on Limbs; 8. Stick Figure Theatre "John Wayne in Angel and the Bad Man"; 9. Miss Lidia's Makeover to the Stars "Sinead O'Connor"; 10. The Art School Girls of Doom "Drummer"; 11. Psycho-Gram "Serum" (serialized throughout episode)
2	June 2, 1991	1. Open: John Denver PSA; 2. Winter Steele "Eat Crow"; 3. Invisible Hands; 4. Stick Figure Theatre "Mister Alfred Hitchcock"; 5. Rocky (by Malcolm Bennett); 6. Footwork "Dog Flirting"; 7. Dog Brain (by J. Falconer); 8. Dangerous Puppets; 9. Cut-Up Camera "Aerobics Instructor"; 10. Excerpt from Joy Street; 11. Weird (by Derek Philips); 12. Æon Flux; 13. Psycho-Gram "Hostage" (serialized throughout episode)
3	June 9, 1991	1. Open: Faith No More "Epic"; 2. Soap Opera "Diandra Wastes Away"; 3. Buzz Box (a short film by David Daniels); 4. Snookles (by Juliet Stroud); 5. Stick Figure Theatre "Edmond O'Brien in D.O.A."; 6. Cut-Up Camera "Roller Coaster"; 7. Miss Lidia's Makeover to the Stars "Sylvester Stallone"; 8. Invisible Hands; 9. Prophet & Loss (by Jonathan Bairstow); 10. Black Hula (by Marv Newland); 11. The Art School Girls of Doom "Beach"; 12. Beach Chair (by Pixar); 13. Æon Flux; 14. Psycho-Gram "Operative X" (serialized throughout episode)
4	June 16, 1991	1. Open: Dental Health; 2. Winter Steele "Ball of Communion"; 3. Jac Mac and Rad Boy "Go!"; 4. Footworks "Scoring"; 5. Dangerous Puppets; 6. The Thing What Lurked in the Tub; 7. Invisible Hands; 8. Monk's Purpose; 9. Stick Figure Theatre "Madonna in Express Yourself"; 10. Æon Flux; 11. Psycho-Gram "Music Industry" (serialized throughout episode)
5	June 23, 1991	1. Open: The B-52's "Love Shack"; 2. Soap Opera "Caught in the Act"; 3. Push Comes to Shove (Enemies) (by Bill Plympton) (serialized throughout episode); 4. Cut-Up Camera "Pizza Delivery"; 5. Face Like a Frog – Mystic Knights "Don't Go in the Basement"; 6. Invisible Hands; 7. Miss Lidia's Makeover to the Stars "George Michael"; 8. Stick Figure Theatre "José Ferrer in Cyrano de Bergerac"; 9. The Art School Girls of Doom "The Bra"; 10. They Might Be Giants "Istanbul (Not Constantinople)"; 11. Æon Flux episode 5 (bug in glass, cracker spread, news show); 12. Psycho-Gram "Suburban Housewife" (serialized throughout episode)
6	June 30, 1991	1. Open: Chalk test bars and tone 2. Winter Steele "Stupid Hippies"; 3. Cut-Up Camera "Elevator"; 4. Invisible Hands; 5. Stick Figure Theatre "Jimmy Stewart in It's a Wonderful Life"; 6. Æon Flux (entire first season + episode 6); 7. Psycho-Gram "Time Travel" (serialized throughout episode)

=== Season 2 (1992) ===
No.	Original air date	Summary
7	September 24, 1992	1. Open: Uncle Louie's Travels (by Drew Friedman) (serialized throughout episode); 2. Æon Flux "Gravity"; 3. The Adventures of Thomas and Nardo; 4. Beavis and Butt-Head "Frog Baseball" (by Mike Judge); 5. The Specialists; 6. Winter Steele "Soft Heart, Hard Alcohol"; 7. Stick Figure Theatre "Night of the Living Dead"; 8. Dog-Boy (by Charles Burns)
8	October 1, 1992	1. Open: The Safety Twins; 2. Bobby & Billy "Let's Go to the Party!"; 3. Wishful Thinking (by Candy Guard); 4. Dog-Boy; 5. The Specialists; 6. Office Space (by Mike Judge); 7. The Listener (by Chris Landreth); 8. Was (Not Was) "Hello Dad, I'm in Jail" Directed and Produced by Christoph Simon Copyright 1988; 9. Wishful Thinking (by Candy Guard) Part 2; 10. Glove Story (Animated & Directed by Miles Flanagan, Mole Hill, Mark Slater); 11. Æon Flux "Night" (Renamed "Mirror" on the Æon Flux DVD collection) Written, Designed, Produced and Directed by Peter Chung
9	October 8, 1992	1. Open: Concert (excerpt from a short film by Ondrej Rudavsky); 2. Joe Normal (Written/Directed by Stephen Holman) Part 1; 3. Was (Not Was) "What Up, Dog?" Copyright 1987; 4. Speedbump the Roadkill Possum "Slipp'ry When Wet"; 5. Doktor Züm "Cafe Le Bad"; 6. The Adventures of Thomas and Nardo; 7. Meggamorphosis (by Sean Schur, featuring the voices of Tim Curry as "The Snake" and Annie Potts as The "Egg"); 8. Stick Figure Theatre "Wm. Shakespeare's Henry V"; 9. Joe Normal (Written/Directed by Stephen Holman) Part 2; 10. The Specialists "Anti Matter World" Part 2/"Necator" Part 1; 11. Bobby & Billy "Winter Fun"; 12. The Killing of an Egg (Animation by Paul Driessen); 13. Dog-Boy "Date with Rondy" Part 1; 14. Joe Normal (Written/Directed by Stephen Holman) Part 3
10	October 15, 1992	1. Open: Stick Figure Theatre "Mr. Jimi Hendrix performing "The Star-Spangled Banner" (Woodstock, 1969)"; 2. Doktor Züm "Typical Records"; 3. Elvis Meets the Spider People From Hell; 4. Winter Steele "All Men Suck (Except Crow)"; 5. Dog-Boy "Date with Rondy" Part 2; 6. Getting to Know Each Other (by Candy Guard); 7. Was (Not Was) "Earth to Doris" Copyright 1986; 8. The Honky Problem (by Mike Judge); 9. Bobby & Billy "Camping Out"; 10. Bob the Frog in "Burp"; 11. At the Beach (From Feggorama); 12. The Specialists "Necator Part 2"/"Fifi Breakout" Part 1
11	October 22, 1992	1. Open: The Running Man (excerpt); 2. The Specialists; 3. Stick Figure Theatre "Sergei Eisenstein's silent classic The Battleship Potemkin (USSR, 1925)"; 4. Flugbild (by Thomas Meyer-Hermann); 5. Ladies (by Candy Guard); 6. Dog-Boy; 7. The Running Man (by Yoshiaki Kawajiri)
12	October 29, 1992	1. Open: The Twelve Dangers of Skydiving (serialized throughout episode); 2. Bobby & Billy "Soap Box Derby"; 3. Speedbump the Roadkill Possum "Batt'ry-fied"; 4. Dog-Boy; 5. Doktor Züm "Atom Bomb Factory"; 6. Stick Figure Theatre "The Crash of the Hindenburg May 6, 1937"; 7. Let's Chop Soo-E (by Eric Pigors); 8. Winter Steele "Rhinestones 'n' Concussions"; 9. The Specialists
13	November 5, 1992	1. Open: Door #8; 2. The Adventures of Thomas and Nardo; 3. This is Not Frank's Planet (by Mike Wellins); 4. Æon Flux "Leisure"; 5. Dog-Boy; 6. In the Aquarium (Excerpt); 7. Stick Figure Theatre "Jack Nicholson and Boris Karloff in The Terror"; 8. The Specialists; 9. Koko's Earth Control (by Max Fleischer, 1928) (new music and sound effects added, abridged)
14	November 12, 1992	1. Open: Devil's Angels (trailer); 2. Smoking Section (Feggo); 3. The End (by Walter Cavazzuti); 4. Heads; 5. Winter Steele "F.T.W."; 6. The Specialists; 7. Pickpocket (Feggo); 8. The Street Sweeper; 9. Speedbump the Roadkill Possum "Buck-a-Roost"; 10. The Hitchhiker; 11. Beware of Dog (Feggo); 12. Dog-Boy
15	November 19, 1992	1. Open: Theatrical trailer for Truck Turner; 2. The Adventures of Thomas and Nardo; 3. Conversations (serialized throughout episode); 4. Dog-Boy; 5. The Specialists; 6. Beavis and Butt-Head "Peace, Love & Understanding" (by Mike Judge); 7. Bobby & Billy "Earning Money"; 8. Æon Flux "Tide"
16	November 24, 1992	1. Open: Amore Baciami; 2. The Adventures of Thomas and Nardo; 3. Æon Flux "War"; 4. The Specialists; 5. Dog-Boy; 6. Stick Figure Theatre "Miss Bette Davis in Of Human Bondage"; 7. Winter Steele "Desperate Beauty"; 8. Amore Baciami (sung by Nuccia Bongiovanni)

=== Season 3 (1993–95) ===
No.	Original air date	Summary
17	December 31, 1993	1. Open: Stick Figure Theatre "The Naked Edge part one" 2. The Blockheads "Mall"; 3. Crazy Daisy Ed "To Officer with Love"; 4. Gas Planet; 5. Smart Talk with Raisin (created by John R. Dilworth); 6. The Dangwoods "Nightmare in Trailer City"
18	July 6, 1994	1. Open: The Day of the Dead Guy; 2. Uncle Louie' Party; 3. Anyway (created by Run Wrake; serialized throughout episode); 4. Technological Threat; 5. Brad Dharma: Psychedelic Detective; 6. Stick Figure Theatre "The Naked Edge part two" 7. One Less Ant; 8. The Bill and Willis Show (created by Wayne White)
19	July 13, 1994	1. Open: Strangers in Paradise; 2. Brad Dharma: Psychedelic Detective; 3. Nightwatchman; 4. Nietzsche Pops; 5. Beat Dedication; 6. Doctor X vs Mister Y 7. Stick Figure Theatre "The Naked Edge part three" 8. Crazy Daisy Ed "Fast, Loud, Dumb and Proud"; 9. Sound Asleep
20	July 27, 1994	1. Open: Uncle Louie "Blind Date"; 2. Genie Junkie (Note: The Subaluwa! sound effect performed by a sumo wrestler with vocal effects done by Lee Tockar eventually made its way to Ed, Edd n Eddy (a program that eventually was also created by Danny Antonucci as an occasional sound effect)); 3. Stick Figure Theatre "The Naked Edge part four" 4. Cat and Mouse at (The) Home; 5. The Blockheads "TV"; 6. The Chore; 7. Human Bomb
21	October 3, 1994	1. Open: Krazy Teens USA; 2. Rico & Klein; 3. Honey Bunny (serialized throughout episode); 4. Stick Figure Theatre "The Naked Edge part five" 5. Crazy Daisy Ed "Let's Go to the Stinkin' Movies"; 6. Balloon Guy; 7. Sweat; 8. Green Beret
22	January 1, 1995	1. Open: Medallion Love; 2. Crazy Daisy Ed "Hill Bomb Skate Sniper"; 3. Swine Cowboy; 4. Stick Figure Theatre "The Naked Edge part six" 5. Autoguard 2000; 6. The Big City; 7. Beat; 8. Brad Dharma: Psychedelic Detective; 9. The Invisible Man in "Blind Love"

=== Season 4 (2014) ===
No.	Original air date	Summary
1	May 15, 2014	1. Most Days; 2. Tiny Chainsaw (by Joel Veitch); 3. Gummie Chernobyl; 4. Bedtime Stories with Abraham Willosby I 5. Sick; 6. Bruce; 7. Institutional Mechanisms; 8. Mac & Cheese; 9. Disco Destroyer 01; 10. Liquid Television Valentine; 11. We Are the Universe From We Can Do It!; 12. Cougar Bike; 13. Mini Sketchbook Animation 010–019; 14. Best Song Ever (by Wallpaper.)
2	May 22, 2014	1. The Lost Coin; 2. Let's Make Out; 3. The Long Legs 6 - "Nick the Cockroach"; 4. Rad; 5. Fluffy McCloud; 6. Haerskogen; 7. Disco Destroyer 02; 8. Slander; 9. Heal Everything Heal Everyone from We Can Do It!; 10. You Came Out (by We Have Band); 11. Playing For Keeps; 12. Bedtime Stories With Abraham Willosby II; 13. Laser Beamer; 14. Boy (by Milgrom)
3	May 29, 2014	1. 16Bit 'Dinosaurs'; 2. The New Leeds Account; 3. Reverse; 4. The Long Legs 1 - "Fatherly Advice"; 5. Change Your Relationship to Nature from We Can Do It!; 6. Drifters; 7. Anna Mammoth; 8. Anaconda; 9. Outside the Box; 10. Dad Teaches Me to Shave; 11. Playing for Keeps; 12. Wisdom of the Lurkers; 13. Untitled Yellow; 14. Éclats de Suie; 15. Odin's Afterbirth 1; 16. Crystal Antler's - Two Way Mirror
4	June 5, 2014	1. Bombguy; 2. Freatures; 3. The Subway Time; 4. Metal; 5. Wisdom Of The Lurkers; 6. Magic Hole; 7. Hello Bottle; 8. Story from North America; 9. Your Heart Is A Prism from We Can Do It!; 10. Plunge; 11. Dirk; 12. Odin's Afterbirth 2; 13. Too Many Words
5	June 12, 2014	1. Delta Heavy - 'Hold Me'; 2. The Chair; 3. Wisdom Of The Lurkers; 4. Dress; 5. Dancing Animals; 6. The Long Legs 10 - "Larry and Christopher"; 7. Chernokids; 8. Howard; 9. Booty Clap; 10. Fleet Foxes - 'The Shrine / An Argument'; 11. Odin's Afterbirth 3

== Revival ==
On October 13, 2011, MTVX, MTV's cross media group, announced the return of Liquid Television. It became an online network. Its first content was "F**KING BEST SONG EVERRR" by Wallpaper, available on the website. Full-length episodes featuring the online content and all-new material were released in 2013.

=== LiquidTelevision.com ===
- The Head - Animated series about the adventures of a young man who has an alien hatch out of his head. Aired on MTV's Oddities, which was a sub-category of Liquid Television in the 1990s.
- The Maxx - Animated adaptation of comic book series The Maxx, the story follows the dual-reality adventures and struggles of the Maxx and his social worker Julie. Also aired on MTV's Oddities.
- Daria - Daria Morgendorffer is a smart, acerbic, and somewhat misanthropic teenage girl who observes the world around her in this spin-off of Beavis and Butt-Head.
- Wonder Showzen - Live-action and animated sketch comedy series about a darkly perverse kids' show modeled after Sesame Street.
- Celebrity Deathmatch - Clay animation series featuring overly violent wrestling matches between celebrities. Originally part of LT's follow-up, Cartoon Sushi.

== See also ==
- Adult Swim
- Cartoon Sushi
- Exposure
- Eye Drops
- Go! Cartoons
- KaBlam!
- Nicktoons Film Festival
- Off the Air
- Oh Yeah! Cartoons
- Random! Cartoons
- Raw Toonage
- Short Circutz
- Spike and Mike's Festival of Animation
- Too Cool! Cartoons
- What a Cartoon!
