= The Honky Problem =

- Directed by: Mike Judge
- Written by: Mike Judge
- Produced by: Mike Judge; Cesca Judge; Dan Dudley
- Starring: Mike Judge
- Edited by: Mike Judge
- Music by: Mike Judge
- Production company: Inbred Jed's Homemade Cartoons
- Distributed by: Spike and Mike
- Release date: 1991
- Running time: 1:49
- Country: United States
- Language: English

The Honky Problem is a 1991 animated short film by Mike Judge. It features an original character, Inbred Jed, who is playing with his country music band somewhere in the desert by a trailer for a small audience of American white trash.

Like Mike Judge's early Beavis and Butt-Head shorts, the film was funded by Spike and Mike and shown on MTV's Liquid Television on season 2, episode 10, first aired on October 15, 1992. The cartoon is also available on the VHS cassette Spike and Mike's Sick and Twisted Festival of Animation Volume One.

== Plot ==
The Honky Problem opens with Inbred Jed, a very emotional hillbilly, and his band The Little Bottom Boys (consisting of an upright bass player, pedal steel guitar player, and himself on guitar and vocals), playing a honky tonk outdoors concert for a small group of similar white trash citizens in a Texas trailer park. Jed introduces himself and the band, bringing himself to tears explaining how good it is to be there, playing a concert. He performs one of his songs, "Long-Legged Woman", to the obvious displeasure of the audience.

After the song is finished, Jed tearfully proclaims how much he loves the song he just played, and performs it again. During the encore, a narrator warns the viewers that what they have just seen is real, and could have been avoided. The narrator further urges viewers to check the Mormon church that they and their spouse are not related before having children, reminding everyone that "inbreeding is everybody's problem".

== In other media ==
One character in the film, the one who yells "Play some Skynyrd, man!", was later named Dave and appeared in a few early Beavis and Butt-Head episodes, most notably the episode "Way Down Mexico Way" and "The Butt-head Experience".

The character Inbred Jed's only other appearance was in the opening titles for the first Beavis and Butt-Head short, Frog Baseball. Before the cartoon starts, there is an "Inbred Jed's Homemade Cartoons" title card styled like the MGM logo with country-western music playing and Inbred Jed giving a somewhat evil hillbilly cackle, animated similarly from the short's closing shot.
