= Eric Pigors =

American artist

Eric Pigors is an American artist based in Santa Clarita, California, mostly known for his 'ToxicToons'. They are cartoons of silly gruesome creatures, such as deformed monsters, vampires and zombies. He worked for Disney Animation for over fifteen years then Warner Bros. Animation for several years and now is self-employed. He vending his New media art wares at his ToxicToons website .

Eric produces printed books and prints of his unique cartoon character art, along with memorabilia including stickers, T-shirts, prints, buttons and other collectibles.

He has a large following on Instagram https://www.instagram.com/toxictoons/ where his fans can see clips of his Born-digital art production process and commentary.

== Career ==
Pigors came up with the name ToxicToons in 1990 while he was choking on a cloud of toxic fumes from a spray can. He was using the spray can to paint the backgrounds used for a batch of his cartoons.

For over 18 years, Pigors worked in the Hollywood animation industry. When he worked for Walt Disney Animation Studios he started out doing hand drawn work on films then transitioned to the digital 2D system of creating art that he uses today.

== Works ==
Pigors has worked on the following movies, shows and video games:

=== Movies ===
- Starchaser: The Legend of Orin (1985) (Inbetween Artist)
- Oliver & Company (1988) (Breakdown and Inbetween Artist)
- The Little Mermaid (1989) (Breakdown and Inbetween Artist)
- The Rescuers Down Under (1990) (Assistant Animator)
- Beauty and the Beast (1991) (Assistant Animator: "Wolves")
- Aladdin (1992) (Assistant Animator: "Rajah" and "Guards")
- The Lion King (1994) (Key Assistant Animator: "Hyenas")
- Pocahontas (1995) (Key Assistant Animator: "Governor Ratcliffe")
- The Hunchback of Notre Dame (1996) (Key Assistant: Additional Clean-Up Animation)
- Hercules (1997) (Key Assistant Animator: "Hades")
- Tarzan (1999) (Key Assistant Animator: "Kerchak")
- Fantasia 2000 (2000) (Key Assistant Animator)
- Atlantis: The Lost Empire (2001) (Key Assistant Clean-Up Animator: "Atlantean King Kashekim Nedakh")
- Treasure Planet (2002) (Visual Development Artist/Character Designer) / (Key Assistant Animator: "Captain Long John Silver")
- Looney Tunes: Back in Action (2003) (Key Assistant Animator)
- Home on the Range (2004) (Key Assistant Animator: "Alameda Slim" and "Junior the Buffalo")
- The Princess and the Frog (2009) (Key Assistant Animator: "Charlotte "Lottie" La Bouff")

=== Shows ===
- Family Dog (1993) designed by Tim Burton.
- Ed, Edd n Eddy's Boo Haw Haw Halloween Special (2005)
- The Looney Tunes Show (2012 - 2013) (Storyboard Clean-Up Artist - 4 Episodes)
- New Looney Tunes (2015 - 2016) (Storyboard Cleanup - 19 Episodes)

=== Shorts ===
- Technological Threat (1988) (Designer) / (Assistant Animator)
- Runaway Brain (1995) (Additional Clean-Up Artist)

=== Video Shorts ===
- One by One (2004) (Clean-Up Artist)
- Kung Fu Panda: Secrets of the Masters (2011) (Clean-Up Animator: Duncan Studio Production)

=== Video games ===
- JumpStart Adventures 3rd Grade: Mystery Mountain (1996) (Animator)
- Spy Fox in "Dry Cereal" (1997) (Assistant Animator)
- Pajama Sam 2: Thunder and Lightning Aren't so Frightening (1998) (Assistant Animator)
- Pajama Sam 3: You Are What You Eat from Your Head to Your Feet (2000) (Assistant Animator)

== Publications ==
- Pigors, Eric. Unkle Pigors's Ghoulishly Ghastly Deadtime Stories / by Eric Pigors. Valencia, California: Eric Pigors, c2003. 1 v. (unpaged): ill. (some col.); 26 cm. ISBN 0-9719118-1-9
- Pigors, Eric. Toxic Toons / Eric Pigors. (Valencia, California): Eric Pigors, c1999. 1 v. (unpaged): chiefly ill. (some col.); 28 cm.
- Pigors, Eric. Cobwebs and Vinegar: The Art of Eric Pigors. 1st ed. Valencia, California: Eric Pigors, [2005?] 1 v. (unpaged): col. ill.; 26 cm. ISBN 0-9719118-0-0

== Film ==
- Nurse Hackit in Let’s Chop Soo-E / International Rocketship Limited; designed, animated, and directed by Eric Pigors; producer, Marv Newland. Canada: [s.n.], 1991. 1 reel of 1 (629 ft.): sd., col.; 35 mm. ref print.
