= It's So Cold in the D =

Single by T-Baby
- Released: January 3, 2008
- Genre: Hip hop
- Length: 4:00
- Songwriter: LaTonya Myles

T-Baby singles chronology
"It's So Cold in the D" (2008)	"It's So Cold in the D" (2015)

Music video
- "It's So Cold in the D" on YouTube

"It's So Cold in the D" is a song recorded by American rapper T-Baby. Its music video was released on YouTube on January 3, 2008. Inspired by the death of her friend Mason Graham, the song was written against violence in her hometown of Detroit. The song and its music video went viral that year and were widely mocked online due to T-Baby's off-key, off-beat vocals and the video's low budget.

In later years, "It's So Cold in the D" became known as an anthem for Detroit, typically to describe winter in the city. It rose to further prominence upon its usage in a 2011 episode of the MTV series Beavis and Butt-Head and has since been covered by numerous artists, including New Kids on the Block and Usher, during performances in Detroit. T-Baby released a rerecorded version of the song with a music video in 2015.

== Background ==
LaTonya Myles, known as T-Baby, was born and raised in eastern Detroit and attended Denby High School. She has one son, Lilamp, who was born in 1998 or 1999 and, as of 2015, she is a single mother. In 2006, her friend Mason Graham was shot and killed while attempting to stop a fight at Detroit's Universal Coney Island.

== Music video and composition ==
The music video for "It's So Cold in the D" was released on YouTube on January 3, 2008. It was filmed by Detroit filmographer Leo Williams at locations throughout Detroit, including at Universal Coney Island and in a cemetery, on a $300 budget. T-Baby appears in the video with orange hair as her family members dance behind her; she later stated that they "just wanted to be in the video" despite not being close with her.

The song's lyrics were written as a tribute to Graham and a denunciation of the death tolls in Detroit, with T-Baby singing on its chorus, "It's so cold in the D/How the fuck do we 'pose to keep peace?" She said in 2023 of the song's message, "Life is cold, the world is cold, people is cold, killing is cold. Everything in the world is just cold. We will never have rest, peace, or sleep unless we're gone ... It's cold everywhere, not just in the D." In the song's second verse, T-Baby raps that "being in the D is bad for your health", and, in the following verse, lists the names of deceased victims of violence in the city. Critics have described T-Baby's vocals on the song as "off-key", "out of sync", and "pitchy".

== Virality and reception ==
By August 2008, "It's So Cold in the D" went viral and amassed more than 300 thousand views on YouTube, largely due to people mocking T-Baby's vocals and the low-budget music video. By 2011, it had more than four million views and, by 2017, it had almost 10 million. It was named 2008's "Wackest Video of the Year" by WorldStarHipHop and Media Take Out wrote that year that it "has gots to be the worst" of all the "ghetto anthems" they had ever heard. Comments on the song were largely negative, which prompted T-Baby to stop using YouTube and to briefly take a hiatus from music. After her phone number was leaked online, she also received threatening voicemails and text messages regarding the song.

=== Legacy ===
In the years since its release, "It's So Cold in the D" has been described as a Detroit anthem, particularly for being quoted frequently during the city's cold winters. WWJ wrote that, despite the "now-iconic" song being "quote[d] regularly" by Metro Detroiters "during the winter months", T-Baby had "never really gotten her due". Alysa Zavala-Offman called T-Baby "something of a one hit wonder" for the song.

"It's So Cold in the D" was featured on an episode of the 2011 reboot of MTV's Beavis and Butt-Head, in which both of the titular characters watch the video and twerk to the song after Beavis asks, "Is this The Real Housewives of Detroit?" T-Baby stated that she was paid $4,000 for the song being used and would be paid every year that the show aired on MTV. Brian Hickey, writing for PhillyVoice, described the show's usage as having "launched [the song] into the attention-span stratosphere". "It's So Cold in the D" was covered by Usher while performing at the Fillmore Detroit in November 2008, by Z-Trip in 2009 at the Detroit Electronic Music Festival, and by New Kids on the Block during their June 2015 performance at The Palace of Auburn Hills in Detroit. A smooth jazz cover of the song was performed on the BET+ series Diarra from Detroit in 2024. The song's title was referenced on the 2014 Eminem single "Detroit vs. Everybody" and on the 2012 Big Sean song "Story by Snoop Lion".

In 2019, Lee DeVito of the Detroit Metro Times wrote that the song's enduring legacy was owed to it "actually [being] catchy as hell" and as having "a lot of heart". Spin included it on their 2023 list of the six "all-time best worst rap" songs, with Jonathan Rowe describing T-Baby's singing as "dreadfully off-key" and "aharmonic", her inflection as "floor-flat" and "emotionless", and her rapping as being "meters off-beat" and "ignoring every tenet in the world of Western music", ultimately writing that the song was "immensely enjoyable" and "sidesplitting". Brennen Siemens wrote in 2025 for the Journal of Artistic Creation and Literary Research that the song was "undoubtedly a hard listen" due to T-Baby "struggl[ing] to stay on the beat".

In June 2015, T-Baby got a manager and released a re-recorded studio version of "It's So Cold in the D" with a new video. TMZ called it "just as ghetto fab as the original", while Rowe wrote that it "could [not] match the egregious majesty of the original" song or video and WRKR's Ramone similarly opined that it was "not as, uhhh...awesome" as the original. She released the song "Detroit Style" in October 2017, which featured rapper Miikey MuuN the Alien and repeatedly referenced "It's So Cold in the D". Hickey praised "Detroit Style" as a "banger".
