= List of Beavis and Butt-Head characters =

The following is a list of characters appearing on the MTV cartoon series Beavis and Butt-Head, each with a description. Some of these characters appear in only one or two episodes. The episodes in which they are known to appear are listed in italics. Other characters with smaller and/or less significant roles sometimes bear the likenesses of some of the characters listed below.

== Beavis and Butt-Head ==
Beavis and Butt-Head are the titular characters and protagonists of the show. The two are portrayed as scrawny, dimwitted teenaged delinquents who are fans of heavy metal music with little regard to anything outside themselves, eternally driven by their desire to "score". The two live in an empty house with a couch and a television set located in the fictional Highland, Texas, attend Highland High, and work at the fast food chain Burger World. Their age is never specified, but creator Mike Judge said they're "probably" 15.

The 2022 revival of the show introduces the duo's parallel universe counterparts who are middle-aged, called "Old Beavis and Butt-Head"; they are unemployed and live in a motel-style apartment.

=== Beavis ===
Beavis
- Beavis and Butt-Head character
- First appearance: Frog Baseball (1992)
- Created by: Mike Judge
- Designed by: Mike Judge
- Voiced by: Mike Judge

In-universe information
- Aliases: Cornholio; Buford; Blovis
- Gender: Male
- Occupation: Student; Fry cook at Burger World; Honorary ATF agent
- Family: Shirley Beavis (mother), Mr. Beavis (father)

Beavis (/biːvɪs/) is one of two protagonists from the series. He is voiced by the show's creator, Mike Judge. In the movie Beavis and Butt-Head Do the Universe, Beavis' mother is referred to as "Shirley Beavis", implying that Beavis is actually the character's last name. His father is a former Mötley Crüe roadie. Beavis has blond hair which he wears in an oversized pompadour style, a pronounced underbite, and an obsessive stare. He speaks in a hoarse voice frequently punctuated by his trademark snicker ("Heh heh"). He is nearly always seen in profile, rather than looking directly at the camera. He is usually seen wearing a Metallica T-shirt, though in merchandising appearances his shirt displays the slogan "Death Rock" to avoid licensing issues. In the episode "Give Blood", he wears a Slayer shirt, while in the Christmas special "It's a Miserable Life" Beavis is seen wearing a Winger shirt during the alternate reality section of the episode. In the 2022 revival, Beavis' older self wears glasses, a dark gray T-shirt and jeans.

He is slightly shorter than his best friend, Butt-Head, although he appears taller from a distance due to his hairstyle. Beavis works with Butt-Head as a fry cook at the fast-food restaurant Burger World and once defiantly revealed that he is a fan of the rock band Bon Jovi to Butt-Head, who dislikes the band and its lead singer, Jon Bon Jovi.

Beavis's name was inspired by a friend of Judge's from his college days named Bobby Beavis, and his look and laugh was inspired by a school friend who looked similar but was in reality nothing like Beavis.

==== Personality ====
Dan Tobin of The Boston Phoenix described Beavis as "the sidekick and follower" who developed into "more of a loose cannon".

Mike Judge once said in an interview that Beavis "is a zero" when it comes to intelligence; indeed, Beavis is often oblivious to what should be obvious. Generally subordinate to Butt-Head and willing to tolerate a large amount of physical and verbal abuse, Beavis nonetheless has limits. In "Murder Site", Beavis was driven to attack and nearly kill Butt-Head, who ceaselessly called him "Butt-Knocker", a term which Beavis resents. Beavis also stood up to Butt-Head while they were watching the video for Rancid's "Nihilism": Butt-Head kept talking about it derisively, prompting Beavis to tell Butt-Head to shut up. When Butt-Head reacted with fury, ordering Beavis never again to tell him to shut up and threatening to attack him, Beavis preemptively kicked Butt-Head in the testicles, told him to shut up again, and walked out of the room to get something to eat.

In spite of his overt idiocy, Beavis possesses a number of character strengths. Though usually shown to be the less intelligent of the two, he can be inadvertently witty, and when discussing subjects that neither he nor Butt-Head understands, he is more likely to guess the actual mechanisms at work. Also, on the rare occasion that a female exhibits interest in one of the duo, it is usually Beavis who gets the attention. Beavis has also shown instances of insight on such topics as the true meaning of Christmas, or in his analysis of a video by Korn. However, in both instances Beavis seems to be either in a trance or possessed, and shortly afterward he displays no recollection of what he just said.

While Butt-Head's main interest in life is "chicks", Beavis seems to be more interested in toilet humor and displays of violence. Beavis has a penchant for making off-beat sound effects to suit the occasion. Whenever he sees something that is sexually arousing, he imitates a spring, indicating a quick erection. He sometimes makes a Bronx cheer by puckering his lips. Beavis also displays a predilection for defecating and things that are related to it, and in a high-pitched tone will often enthusiastically utter the word "poop", or will say the word "plop" to indicate a bowel movement. In "Lizard dinner" Beavis reveals that he has three passions in life: Spanking the monkey, fire and lizards.

Beavis has a more volatile, unpredictable nature. His hasty actions usually end in disaster, ranging from being deported to Mexico to severely injuring himself and occasional arrest for crimes such as trespassing. In some early episodes, Beavis displays signs of being a pyromaniac. Though his obsession with fire remained an obvious trait, as the seasons progressed and network censorship pressures increased, his fixation became more of a passing gag. In a deleted scene from the 1996 film, Beavis steals the Declaration of Independence to use as toilet paper.

==== Cornholio ====
Cornholio is an alter ego of Beavis; after consuming large amounts of sugar, caffeine or other stimulants, he pulls his shirt collar over his head, raises his forearms at a right angle to his chest, and then begins to yell or scream erratically, producing a stream of gibberish in an odd faux-Spanish accent while wandering aimlessly. When he stops acting as the Cornholio persona, Beavis usually has no memory of what happened.

==== Relationship with Butt-Head ====
Though the closest of confidants, Beavis and Butt-Head have a jaded, violent, and at times borderline sadistic relationship. Butt-Head often insults and physically abuses Beavis. Beavis is usually a follower, willingly taking Butt-Head's instructions and cooperating in his endeavors. This appears to be a byproduct of Beavis' own general witlessness rather than any fear of Butt-Head's abuse – as demonstrated in the alternate reality of "It's a Miserable Life", in which Butt-Head had never been born and Beavis was instead the dim but productive friend of younger neighbor and schoolmate Stewart Stevenson.

=== Butt-Head ===
Butt-Head
- Beavis and Butt-Head character
- First appearance: Frog Baseball (1992)
- Created by: Mike Judge
- Designed by: Mike Judge
- Voiced by: Mike Judge

In-universe information
- Full name: Butt Head
- Gender: Male
- Occupation: Student; Cashier at Burger World; Honorary ATF agent
- Family: Missy Butt-Head (mother), Mr. Butt-Head (father)

Butt-Head is the other protagonist of the series. He is voiced by the show's creator, Mike Judge. Judge got the name Butt-Head from his university days, when he knew a couple of other students who had the nicknames 'Iron Butt' and 'Butt-Head'. Unlike Beavis, it is not unusual for him to look at the camera.

Compared to his best friend Beavis, Butt-Head appears to be calmer, cockier, and slightly more intelligent and self-aware; however he is oblivious to subtleties, is semi-literate and is still significantly more dimwitted than the other characters in the show. Despite his unintelligence and immaturity, he is usually confident in everything he says and does – no matter how ridiculous or frivolous it is. Dan Tobin of The Boston Phoenix described Butt-Head as "ringleader, the devious visionary."

Butt-Head seems to be the lazier and crueler of the two. He never seems to react to things unless they catch his attention, in which case he describes them as 'cool'. Beavis, on the other hand, always has some kind of reaction, although his actions predictably end with bad results.

Butt-Head has a severe overbite, wears dental braces, and has brown hair and squinted eyes. His top gums are often exposed and he speaks with a nasally deep voice and a slight lisp, repeatedly punctuating his speech with his trademark chuckle ("Uh huh huh") and mostly disfluencies before speaking. He is usually shown wearing an AC/DC T-shirt. In merchandising appearances, his shirt displays the word 'Skull', to avoid licensing issues. In the episode "Refuse Service" it is revealed that the school psychiatrist has diagnosed Butt-Head as a sociopath.

== Characters voiced by guest stars ==
- Homeless man (voiced by Bobcat Goldthwait in most appearances, David Koechner in Bounty Hunters) – First seen briefly in a drunken stupor behind Maxi-Mart, where he trades his booze for the duo's old doughnuts. He later teaches Beavis and Butt-Head the art of panhandling after noticing that pedestrians are more charitable toward him after mistaking the duo for his children.
- Mr. Manners/Mr. Candy (voiced by David Spade) – Mr. Manners is an educational speaker who initially comes to Highland High to teach the students proper etiquette. He returns as Mr. Candy, promoting a fundraising drive for the school.
- David Letterman (voiced by himself) – Letterman appears as himself in Late Night with Butt-Head. Prior to coming up with an idea for a television show as a class project that very closely approximates Letterman's show, Beavis and Butt-Head are watching television at home when Beavis asks Butt-Head to "put on that Letter dude". Butt-Head switches to Letterman's show just in time for his lead-in for "Top Ten Ways to Break Stuff".
- Biology Teacher (Laraine Newman) – A brunette female teacher who replaces Mrs. Dickey in the 2011 revival episodes (Dumb Design, Copy Machine and School Test).

== Highland High faculty and staff ==
- Principal McVicker (voiced by Mike Judge) – The principal of Highland High School. McVicker suffers from extreme nervous tension caused by having to deal with Beavis and Butt-Head over the years. He hates the duo more than anyone else. He speaks with a New York accent, constantly shakes, his voice is strained, and he keeps a bottle of Old Crow whiskey in his desk, from which he drinks even when people are present. McVicker also has a bottle of pills (presumably anti-depressants or Xanax) that he keeps in his desk and also will use (by the handful) in public. When Beavis and Butt-Head are assumed to be dead in the last episode, McVicker organizes a teachers' party. When they show up at a memorial fundraiser though, McVicker suffers a heart attack, and Coach Buzzcut attempts to resuscitate him afterwards with CPR, while Beavis and Butt-Head incorrectly assume he was "making out" with McVicker. His fate was left ambiguous for several years until the 2011 series revealed that he was still alive, and still dealing poorly with Beavis and Butt-Head's antics and stupidity. His name is spelled "McVicar" in early episodes. Both he and Buzzcut have not appeared in any episodes made since 2022; Judge noted that he did not enjoy performing their voices, and regarding McVicker added that "If you were really going with continuity, he would be dead by now [...] I saw him as this alcoholic who was about to go anyway."
- Coach Bradley Buzzcut (voiced by Mike Judge) – He is in charge of Physical Education, Math and Science; the angry, loud-mouthed, antisocial Buzzcut dislikes Beavis and Butt-Head nearly as much as Principal McVicker does. He has a military background in the United States Marine Corps, although in an earlier episode he also made reference to serving with "the Big Red One" in the Vietnam War. He is presumed to be extremely conservative. He takes great pleasure in belittling anyone, especially the duo. He looks at them as personifying everything wrong with humanity.
- David Van Driessen (voiced by Mike Judge) – A teacher who is characterized as an extremely liberal hippie. Specifically, he is a pacifist, concerned about environmental protection, believes in aid for foreign countries and women's rights. He has a beard, long hair, and wears a peace sign T-shirt and flip-flops. In the 2022 revival, he wears a white T-shirt and green jacket. He generally speaks in a soft, gentle voice, encourages his students to get in touch with their feelings, and often plays folk songs on his guitar. He generally expresses a sincere regard for his responsibilities as a teacher and for his social ideals, although in Time Machine, he neglects his class in order to hit on an attractive woman. He has a habit of ending nearly every sentence with "M'kay?" (the M'kay predicate would later be used in South Park, made by ViacomCBS's other subsidiary Comedy Central). Driessen would later serve as the main inspiration for the character Gerald Goode on Judge's show The Goode Family, with Judge reusing Driessen's voice for the character.
- School Nurse – A heavy-set woman with thick glasses, a mole on her chin, and a traditional nursing dress and cap, she provides medical attention to Beavis and Butt-Head, such as when the duo get head lice, and when Beavis severs his finger in wood shop. A character of similar appearance and voice appears as a worker at an animal shelter who waives the $50 adoption fee for Beavis and Butt-Head to take a stray dog because of the dog's aggressive behavior.
- Janitor/Crazy Farmer (voiced by Kristofor Brown) – Shown in different contexts; besides Highland High, he is once shown as the janitor at the local mall who calls Beavis and Butt-Head "a couple of dumbasses. In these contexts he seems to simply be an ordinary old man. In Cow Tipping and Bungholio: Lord of the Harvest, he is portrayed as a slow-witted, bluish-skinned farmer who is dangerously senile. On both occasions, he appears to be attempting to decapitate Beavis with a chainsaw. In A Great Day, he appears at the entry door of Highland High as Beavis and Butt-Head try to enter during a holiday to tell them that the school is closed. In The Great Cornholio, Beavis walks past him in the hallway after assuming his Cornholio persona, but he does not speak to Beavis. In Virtual Stupidity, it is revealed that he works a second job as a clown and is strongly implied to be into bestiality. A character with a similar appearance also appears as one of Tom Anderson's friends and presumed fellow veterans in "Foreign Exchange".
- Mrs. Dickey (voiced by Penelope Trud) – A female science teacher at Highland, and occasional customer at Burger World. She is annoyed by Beavis and Butt-Head, particularly by their incessant laughing when she tries to teach sex education (No Laughing). She forces Daria Morgendorffer to work with them in Scientific Stuff, in the hope of getting a proper experiment out of the lads.
- Spanish Teacher (voiced by Mike Judge) – A middle-aged Latino Spanish teacher who hates Beavis and Butt-Head, because the only Spanish they know is what they have picked up from Taco Bell.
- Jim the Substitute (voiced by Julián Rebolledo) – A substitute teacher who briefly takes over when Mr. Van Driessen injures himself attempting to assume the lotus position on his desk. Beavis, Butt-Head, and other classmates take an immediate liking to him on account of his free-spirited, unorthodox way of running the class. Despite the duo's cynicism and irresponsibility, he continues to like them.
- Dreama (voiced by Tracy Grandstaff) – A woman who meets the boys in the school nurse's office after the two are sent there due to their poor personal hygiene (Let's Clean It Up). She dances, plays Hindustani music on a tape player, and ultimately gives an oil massage to the two. It is later revealed that Dreama is a teacher's aide, and her actions are attributed to a daze that ensues after she suffers a concussion.
- Dr. Floss (voiced by Tracy Grandstaff) – A psychiatrist who is hired at Highland High (They're Coming to Take Me Away, Huh Huh). She requests to see the duo in her office immediately after introducing herself in Mr. Buzzcut's class. She gives the boys a Rorschach inkblot test, with the boys interpreting each picture as a man masturbating. When shown a signed photo of Julio Iglesias grasping a microphone stand protruding from between his legs, Butt-Head describes it as "just a bunch of weird shapes." She sends them to an inpatient psychiatric facility.
- Ms. Jenkins (voiced by Agnes Herrmann) – The school's speech therapist (Speech Therapy). Beavis and Butt-Head wind up in her class because they return from suspension on a day when Mr. Van Driessen has taken his class to the botanical gardens, and Principal McVicker needs a class to put them in. They thoroughly enjoy her class as they misinterpret what she is teaching. They mistake a diagram of the vocal cords for a vagina. Butt-Head also uses the mirror given to him to observe his mouth while he speaks to try to look up her dress. They also mishear things said during speech exercises. They mistake the phrase "as much" for "assmunch", and the phrase "but whole" for "butthole". McVicker becomes angry when the boys repeat these words after Ms. Jenkins asks them to show him what they learned in class. She intervenes before he assaults them.
- Mr. Dick Gaylord (voiced by Mike Judge) – The school's career counselor, who has trouble coming up with a suitable career path for either of the duo in The Future of Beavis and Butt-Head. The duo refer to him by his first name. He returns in School Test where he attempts to help Beavis and Butt-Head prepare for the school test.
- School Psychologist (voiced by Pamela Adlon) – Only appears in "School Test" where Beavis and Butt-Head offend her by talking to her about pornography.
- Mrs. Ortiz (voiced by Rose Abdoo) – The school psychiatrist in seasons 9 and 10. In the episode "Nice Butt-Head," she prescribes medication to Butt-Head to curb his aggressive tendencies. She returns in the episode "Sad Boys", where she sends the boys to a psychiatric facility after they pretend to be emo in order to attract women and mistake the term "self-harm" to mean masturbation.
- Tanya (voiced by Tracy Grandstaff) – The teacher of the Gifted Class (Young, Gifted and Crude). Beavis and Butt-Head are sent to her class when they inexplicably score very high on a written test. Her class is very unstructured. The duo eventually end up being returned to their regular class.
- School Librarian (voiced by Tracy Grandstaff in the original series and Lori Nasso in season 8) – Appearing in The History of Women, the librarian attempts to assist Beavis and Butt-Head when Mr. Van Driessen sends the pair to the school library as part of a Woman's Day report assignment (after the two previously delivered reports that were clearly unprepared). While the librarian (an attractive blonde woman who bears some resemblance to Stewart Stevenson's mother) good-naturedly attempts to help the pair research influential women (including a woman named "Sarah Dixon Dewey", who she claimed was actually behind the development of the Dewey Decimal System), she fails to notice whenever Beavis and Butt-Head brazenly ogle her, including looking up her skirt whenever she uses the stepladder to get books down from higher shelves for them. After the duo fail their report yet again, their punishment is to assist the librarian after school, which inadvertently allows them to continue ogling her as they had done before. She also faints in the episode "Cyber-Butt" when she views pornography that Beavis and Butt-Head were able to access on the school computers with help from Stewart.

== Classmates ==
Classmates in Beavis and Butt-Head included:

- Daria Morgendorffer (voiced by Tracy Grandstaff) is one of Beavis and Butt-Head's classmates. She is a sardonic teenager who doesn't hold the duo in high regard. She eventually got her own spin-off show Daria.
- Stewart Stevenson (voiced by Adam Welsh in 1993–1997, Thomas Middleditch in 2011, Sam Johnson in 2022) – A chubby nerdy boy who is usually depicted wearing a Winger T-shirt (as opposed to the heavier Metallica and AC/DC shirts that Beavis and Butt-Head wore). He likes to think of himself as Beavis and Butt-Head's friend, although the pair really do not like him and usually tease him. He does not seem to remember how badly they treat him between incidents, or does not care about their maltreatment if he does remember it. Stewart's worshipful attitude towards the contemptuous duo mirrors how Beavis and Butt-Head relate to someone who detests them— gang leader Todd. This attitude towards the duo seems to continue onto his adulthood, when he gleefully reunites with Beavis and Butt-head at the hospital and refers to them as his "best buddies", although this appreciation is unrequited by Beavis and Butt-head as usual (Kidney). Frequently, when caught committing some sort of outrageous prank, Beavis and Butt-Head blame (or frame) Stewart ("He threatened to hit us" or "Stewart got us the porn"), which is quite often believed, even though Stewart is far more passive and smaller than the pair.
- PATs (voiced by Guy Maxtone-Graham and Sam Johnson) – Short for Positive Acting Teens, PAT is a group of goody-good honor-student caricatures who are friends with Stewart. In Dumb Design, Stewart is shown wearing a PAT T-shirt, whereas previously he was friends with PAT members but he did not appear to be a member of the group. The PATs are led by Mr. Max Graham (see Local Residents below), the father of one of their members. Beavis and Butt-Head are forced to accompany the group to pick up litter along a highway as an alternative to detention (Patsies). Beavis finds a hubcap and he and Butt-Head throw it back and forth to each other across the highway, like a frisbee. The flying hubcap strikes an oncoming truck and hits Mr. Graham in the head, knocking him unconscious (although everyone believes that he is dead). Butt-Head steals his wallet while he is lying face down on the ground. The PATs are then forced to wash and wax Buzzcut's truck while Mr. Graham tries unsuccessfully to get B&B to return his wallet. In Party, the PATs accompany Stewart to Beavis and Butt-Head's party and unsuccessfully try to get Beavis and Butt-Head to come to their youth group's cookout. In Dumb Design Mr. Graham and the PATs are leading a protest to force Highland High to teach intelligent design in addition to evolution in science classes. B&B join the protest because they believe that his message is actually that they shouldn't have to learn anything they cannot understand – which is practically anything.
- Cassandra (voiced by Tracy Grandstaff) – Mainly a parody of hippie or New Age thought (like Mr. Van Driessen). She wears glasses, Doc Martens boots, and a shapeless blue dress. In Late Night With Butt-Head, she is shown wearing a white top with a unicorn on it. She is the only girl aside from Daria who does not seem to detest either of the boys. In Wall of Youth, Butt-Head attempts to flirt with her briefly, but she is oblivious to his interest because of his immaturity. In Animation Sucks, she gives the boys friendly advice without the condescending sarcasm Daria would use.
- Earl (voiced by Julián Rebolledo) – Usually sits in the front row of class looking at pictures of nude women in a men's magazine. He has a buzz cut hair-style, a tough angular face with a stubbly goatee, and a black shirt buttoned tightly at the collar (in some episodes, a black jacket with a white T-shirt underneath). Earl is a central character in Incognito, in which he tries to kill Beavis and Butt-Head. In the end he is punished by Mr. Van Driessen, who confiscates his pistol, which makes him cry. In Pierced, Beavis and Butt-Head tease Earl's earring, causing him to beat them up, but then the duo decide to get their own ears pierced when they notice the earring has a skull design. These two episodes are among the few in which Earl actually speaks. In Teen Talk he appears on stage, but says nothing when Captain Dick Jackman asks him what makes him "really, really mad". He appears regularly in the Marvel comic, with many speaking parts and he is shown as a member of Todd Ianuzzi's gang.
- Kimberly (variously voiced by Tracy Grandstaff, Jennifer Emerson, Christine Walters, and Pamela Adlon) – A pretty girl who is often the object of unwanted attention from Beavis and Butt-Head. She refuses to practice CPR on them during Buzzcut's swimming class (Water Safety). The duo file an unsuccessful sexual harassment suit against her on the grounds that she is giving them "stiffies" (Sexual Harassment). In Crisis Line she calls the duo unknowingly to ask for relationship advice. Butt-Head recommends that she have sex the next day with anyone who is polite to her. She introduces the pair to her boyfriend, who promptly grabs them and throws them across the room. In Whiplash Beavis tries to chat with her on the school bus prior to the accident that he and Butt-Head have set up in an attempt to obtain money for being injured. Although not named, a character of similar appearance sits in the front row of the theater in front of B&B as they watch a Twilight movie in the opening scene of Werewolves of Highland.
- Dean Zunker (voiced by Guy Maxtone-Graham) – A chubby boy with glasses and brown hair. In Wall of Youth, he tells Beavis and Butt-Head about how he took his girlfriend Debby to see Jurassic Park which Butt-Head believes is a true story because "they got it off a book". In Substitute he presents Jim, the substitute teacher, with a collage based upon the Walt Whitman poem "Cavalry Crossing a Ford" that the class worked together after school to make for him. In Wet Behind the Rears he expresses surprise that Beavis and Butt-Head are going to actually take a shower (which they are trying very hard to get out of). A kind, laid-back teenager, Dean is one of the few students who does not appear to hate them, and he is possibly the only regular character who is not rude and insulting to them. In turn, B&B have had more non-crude and hostile conversations with him than anyone else in the series. In Bus Trip Mr. Van Driessen calls the last name "Zunker" as Dean boards the bus for a field trip to Mount Perdido. A similar character named Martin appears in Young, Gifted, and Crude and Virtual Stupidity.
- Hiroshi "Hiro" Nakayama – An exchange student from Japan. Beavis and Butt-Head become Hiro's chaperons who are tasked with guiding Hiro through American culture (Foreign Exchange). Hiro impresses them by triggering flashbacks from Mr. Anderson, who was a prisoner of war during World War II (Anderson refers to him as Colonel Imoto, immediately before mistaking B&B for Marines who have come to rescue him). Upon arriving back in Japan, it becomes apparent that he has picked up Beavis and Butt-Head's masturbatory habits and affinity for metal music, much to his family's dismay.
- Tommy (voiced by Julián Rebolledo) – The resident jock of the school. In Spanish Fly he consumes the Spanish fly that Beavis and Butt-Head pour into what they think is an attractive girl's milk carton. Tommy drinks it instead. As a result, the duo mistakenly believe that he wants to have sex with them. This fear manifests itself in the locker room and during gym class when Tommy chooses Beavis as his wrestling opponent. The match begins with him dominating until Beavis kicks him in the testicles at Butt-Head's suggestion.
- Martin (voiced by Mike Judge in the original series and Thomas Middleditch in season 8) – Slim, bespectacled, brown-haired filmmaking aficionado. He wears a black T-shirt with a white skull on it. He films B&B as they eat only Burger World food for 30 days as part of a class project – although B&B's motivation is to become famous and get "chicks" (Supersize Me). He appears several times in the crowd of assembled students outside Highland High School in Beavis and Butt-Head Are Dead. He is also one of Ms. Jenkins' "speech team" (Speech Therapy), and one of the group that Van Driessen takes to the art gallery (Butt Is It Art?). He is one of the classmates who takes a field trip to Fort Sawyer to investigate possible military careers (Drones). In Rabies Scare he asks Beavis if he can foam at the mouth when he comes to class with an exposed dog bite on his leg. Butt-Head then puts Alka-Seltzer tablets in Beavis' mouth. In the Christmas- themed episode "It's a Miserable Life," when Butt-Head sees how the world and its people would be like if he were never born, we see that in this timeline, Martin is happily dating Daria, as Butt- Head never having been born meant he was never there to destroy Daria's image of boys.
- Daniel Butkis – A teenager with blonde hair worn in a rat-tail style. Beavis and Butthead laugh at his last name during roll call (No Laughing). Daniel soon takes advantage of the duo during Buzzcut's roll call by laughing at them, after learning they can't laugh for a week or they risk expulsion. He also appears in Politically Correct, asking Beavis and Butthead if they will help to pay for football uniforms.
- Gina (voiced by Tracy Grandstaff) – Another girl who is often the object of unwanted attention by the duo, Gina is Todd's girlfriend. She has brunette hair in a vaguely heavily hairsprayed 1980s metalhead style. Being Beavis and Butthead's classmate, she is not fond of them, showing her dislike in many instances, belittling them when they attempt to run for school office and she gives them a dollar to stay away from her. She also has a car which she uses to stage a quick getaway when cornered at the gas station (Beavis and Butt-Head vs. the Vending Machine). In Scratch 'N' Win she gives B&B a dollar to leave her alone. They buy a lottery ticket and win $500, which they use to buy a riding lawn mower. In Virtual Stupidity, she is revealed to also be an accomplice in crime with Todd, holding onto his car keys and providing cover for him.
- Glennis (voiced by Kosha Patel) – A shy, freckled & blue-haired girl who attends Van Dreissen's class with the boys. She falls in love with Beavis due to them both being outcasts (The Weird Girl). However, she is left heartbroken when Beavis is oblivious to her advances and declares his love for fire over her. Thus, she burns down part of Highland High School, presumably to get his attention. She is promptly arrested, but attempts to get Beavis' attention one more time by writing "I <3 U" on the cop car window. However, B&B mistake this for her wanting Butthead instead. Glennis is one of the few characters in the entire show to ever express genuine feelings for Beavis or Butthead.
- Cody (voiced by Jayden Libran) - A short, chubby African-American boy with glasses. Though not very extroverted, he comes across as disgusted and mean when he does speak, calling Beavis and Butthead "dorks" (The Good Deed) and referring to Glennis as "that weird girl in Van Driessen's class" (The Weird Girl). Otherwise, he appears to be a normal Gen Z teen, often filming things on his smartphone (The Weird Girl). In Sleepover, his plan to mess with B&B (he invites them over not to play a cool new video game, but to watch him play while he refuses to give them any chance to) is wrecked when his well-meaning but overbearing parents mistake B&B for his friends and invite them to a sleepover that Cody doesn't want (but he gives in when Butt-head tells him they're NOT leaving until they get to play a game where they can shoot people). At the end of it, Beavis becomes Cornholio from eating too much of Cody's "Special Breakfast" cereal (and any other sweets he can find), his kitchen is left wrecked, and his PS5 is stolen by Butthead, as he looks in furious silent horror.
- Classmates – Other unnamed but frequently appearing students include a black male who is always seen listening to his headphones; a white male with long blond hair who is usually sleeping; a punk girl with blonde and black hair who is always doing her nails during class; and a boy with glasses and shoulder-length red hair usually seen wearing a Led Zeppelin shirt.

== Local residents ==
Local residents in Beavis and Butt-Head included:

- Todd Ianuzzi (voiced by Mike Judge in his first two appearances, Toby Huss under the alias Rottilio Michieli prior to 2011 in later appearances) – A local violent small time criminal and a role model to Beavis and Butt-Head even though his contempt for them is clear. He takes any opportunity to use the boys for money or beat them for troubling him with their affection. Although Todd verbally and physically abuses them, the boys continue to seek him out. However, Beavis is implied to have a little contempt for Todd himself, as he stands up to him (albeit in his Cornholio form) in Bungholio: Lord of the Harvest, and has a dream in Beavis and Butthead Do The Universe where he reacts with joy when Todd and his gang are brutally decapitated and killed by his then-crush Serena Ryan. Mike Judge apparently based Todd on an actual thug from his childhood, who was a neighbourhood menace. And was known for making threats and intimidations of intended assault. A middle-aged Todd appears in the 2025 episode "Plumber's Helpers" in which he now runs his own plumbing business and briefly hires the duo.
- Mr. Stevenson (voiced by Mike Judge) – Stewart's father, a middle-aged male. In early episodes, he is a teacher at Highland High (No Laughing, Citizen Butt-Head) and presumably quit teaching after being fed up by Beavis and Butt-Head's behavior. Later he is a businessman, judging from his cell phone and references to "the office" (Prank Call). He is a regular victim of Beavis and Butt-Head's destructive shenanigans, such as having his house blown up (Stewart's House) or vandalized and robbed (Stewart Moves Away), wrecking and overturning his car when B&B simultaneously wave through traffic on both intersecting streets during a blackout (Blackout!), or having his phone forcefully inserted into his rectum when Beavis and Butt-Head accidentally lead prank-call victim Harry Sachz to his house (Prank Call). He tries to come off as a caring and responsible family man, but he reveals his cowardly nature in times of distress, invariably trying to shift blame to Stewart. He has a large collection of pornographic magazines, which Beavis and Butt-Head know the exact location of. It is implied that he is impotent in Sperm Bank when he visits Stork in a Bottle Sperm Bank with his wife. In A Very Special Episode he rushes B&B to the animal hospital when they find a wounded baby bird. He takes them to a park to release the bird when, against their wishes, its condition improves. Butt-Head flips it into the air, and it promptly falls to the ground as the pair walk away. He is also shown as a customer at Burger World who becomes frustrated when neither Beavis nor Butt-Head can tell him whether the milk shakes are made with shake mix or milk and ice cream (Customers Suck).
- Mrs. Stevenson (voiced by Tracy Grandstaff) – Stewart's mother and good-natured housewife, who is depicted as an airhead. In Stewart's House, she has a Southern accent, but for the rest of the series, she possesses a thick Upper Midwestern accent. She enlists the duo's help when Stewart disappears (Stewart Is Missing), and she trusts them to take his homework to school for him when he is sick (The Great Cornholio). She believes that Beavis and Butt-Head are good friends to Stewart, being oblivious of the pair's antics and of their negative influence on him. She is known for her catchphrase "Oh dear!", which she especially frequently says when her son and Beavis and Butt-Head get into trouble. In Plate Frisbee, she shows incredible trust (misplaced, of course) by serving cookies to Stewart and the boys on a plate she describes as "17th Century antique". Inspired by watching a discus thrower in the Olympics, B&B throw the plate back and forth like a frisbee, and it eventually shatters in Stewart's hand after a series of unlikely mishaps that should break it but don't. In TV Violence, she finally displays some anger toward the two. The Stevensons buy a satellite dish and B&B gravitate toward the violent programs. She tires of their protests when she repeatedly changes the channel to less violent programs and throws them out of the house. In Leave it to Beavis, she portrays June Cleaver in a parody of Leave it to Beaver (with Butt-Head as Ward Cleaver, Stewart as Lumpy, Todd as Eddie Haskell and Beavis as Beaver). In keeping with the format and feel of the original series, which aired on network television from 1957 to 1963, this episode was filmed in black and white. In the Christmas episode It's a Miserable Life, she is overheard praying to God for help because Beavis and Butt-Head are a bad influence on Stewart. The duo pay her little respect or attention except in regard to her breasts. Butt-Head in particular seems to have a notable crush on Mrs. Stevenson, as in one episode, she asks him for a favor, and Butt-Head fantasizes in a daydream about getting rewarded by hanging out on the beach with Mrs. Stevenson, who is wearing a bikini and lets her hair down, appearing as a blonde bombshell.
- Lolita and Tanqueray (both voiced by Tracy Grandstaff) – Two skimpily-dressed trailer-trash vamps, always introduced with the line "I'm Lolita, and this here's Tanqueray" in a heavy Texas accent. Lolita has dark hair and Tanqueray is a blonde. In Date Bait, they exploit their sexuality to manipulate the duo out of their money and movie tickets, promising to let them in the back door (which they never do as B&B wait outside in the rain). Over the course of the series, the two drastically change appearance, with Lolita originally having much darker skin. In Teen Talk, they want to make out with B&B, but the show host bothers them with questions long enough that two members of the production crew beat them to it. In Teen Talk, it is revealed that Lolita (and possibly Tanqueray) starred in a pornographic video which her principal rented. In Tornado, Lolita and Tanqueray ask Beavis and Butthead to "be our last boyfriends on earth" before a tornado strikes, but they are blown away to the Land of Oz before anything happens. B&B assume that they died in the tornado.
- Redneck woman (voiced by Tracy Grandstaff) – This unnamed woman appears a number of times. She is usually sitting in a messy trailer with rollers in her hair, unshaven legs, circular bandages over the corns on her feet and often a cigarette hanging out of her mouth. She has an old husband who smokes and wears shorts (his appearance could be considered a prototype for King of the Hill character Dale Gribble), and a sallow-looking son with a distinct Southern accent. In 1-900-BEAVIS, she makes money by imitating a sexy female on a phone-sex hotline. In Tired, she sits in front of her trailer in a lawn chair with her feet propped up on a cardboard box as Beavis rolls down a hill in a giant tire and Butt-Head runs past chasing him. She threatens to shoot them if they ever step on her property again. In Radio Sweethearts, she is shown in the same lawn chair, listening to the radio when the boys guest DJ.
- Billy Bob (voiced by Mike Judge) – An early recurring character. An obese redneck, Billy Bob is often shown wearing only a cowboy hat and briefs. He appears fully clothed in Heroes as the owner of a skeet shooting establishment. He wears stereotypical redneck clothes such as a tight-fitting green T-shirt, white jeans and cowboy boots. He often smokes a cigar. In Bedpans & Broomsticks he is shown walking on a treadmill, dressed only in briefs and a cowboy hat, puffing a cigar and fantasizing about food while a doctor and nurse observe him. When B&B steal his scooter he chases after them (even smashing through a brick wall to get them), then he collapses after suffering an apparent heart attack. B&B revive him by shocking him with an electrical cord. They steal $11 out of his wallet.
- Biker Lady (voiced by Penelope Trud) – An attractive yet gruff-looking female motorcycle rider who appears in Friday Night. She uses the boys as accessories to shoplift items at Maxi-Mart. The boys cooperate in hopes that they will "score" with her. Once the owner suspects, she escapes by throwing hot coffee in his face and taking the boys along for a ride on her chopper (motorcycle) before abandoning them to seek her own adventures.
- Mistress Koura Anthrax (voiced by Mike Judge) – An elderly dominatrix who is featured in Door to Door. When the boys ring her doorbell requesting charity money, she invites them in only to ambush them, chain them to the wall, and begin whipping and dominating them. In exchange for the time the boys spend with her, she donates a check for $100. She writes a letter to Mr. Van Driessen (which he reads aloud to the whole class) saying that he can send Beavis and Butt-Head over to her place any time they need more donations. She appears twice in the spin-off comics, both owning a strip club and being headmistress of a private school, and also answering a letters page; she didn't recognise the lads. In the comics, her first name is spelled "Cora".
- Harry Sachz (voiced by Mike Judge) – A tall, physically imposing man with a receding hairline and mullet haircut, he experiences several weeks of prank calls after Beavis and Butt-Head randomly select him out of a new phone book. The duo find his name amusing and they refer to him as "Hairy Sack [scrotum]". The calls involve the flushing of a toilet and scatological noises (Prank Call). Sachz eventually purchases a caller ID to track their phone number. He then calls them, telling them that they have won a free pizza and he offers to deliver it in order to find out where they live, but they could not remember their address. When Sachz instructs them to read the address off their mail, Butt-Head reads Stewart's address off some mail he and Beavis stole from the Stevensons' mailbox, and Stewart's father suffers the consequences. In Nothing Happening he is shot by police when they believe he is armed and his body is carried away on a stretcher. In Butt Flambe a character with the same appearance, who has been shot three times, is sitting in the waiting room at the hospital. He is referred to as Mr. Borman. He later dies and Butt-Head, pretending to be a doctor, takes the bullets removed from his body. In Doomsday an unnamed character of similar appearance returns home after an evacuation to find Beavis and Butt-Head living in his house. He attacks them for trespassing.
- Tom Anderson (voiced by Mike Judge) – An older man, presumably of post-retirement age, who lives with his wife Marcy near Beavis and Butt-Head in Highland. Anderson mentions fighting in the Battle of Anzio during World War II, as well as in the Korean War. As mentioned in Screamers, Anderson's address is 4120 Woodrow Court. Standing 6'3" and weighing 250 lbs., Anderson is very conservative and he frequently makes reference to his days in the military, usually in a futile attempt to teach Beavis and Butt-Head the ethics of hard work and discipline. He is primarily the target of pranks, although occasionally Beavis and Butt-Head attempt to do Anderson a favor. Mike Judge says that Anderson is based on every middle-aged authority figure he knew growing up in New Mexico. Anderson would later serve as an inspiration for Hank Hill from Judge's later show King of the Hill with Judge recycling Anderson's voice for the character. Anderson is the only character to interact with all three versions of Beavis and Butt-Head (Teenage, Old and Smart) in the Paramount series.
- Marcie Anderson – Tom Anderson's wife. She appears in Beavis and Butt-Head Do America, and she also has cameos in a few episodes. She and Tom are shown holding hands walking past the church where a wedding is taking place in Here Comes the Bride's Butt. In Good Credit she accompanies Tom to a war veterans reunion where he cannot check into the hotel because B&B have his credit card and charge multiple animals at a pet store. In Shopping Cart she and Tom are shown getting into their RV in a grocery store parking lot. B&B come up with the idea of deliberately getting hit by cars to make money after a driver backs into Butt-Head in a shopping cart and then gives him $10 not to report it. Their scheme goes awry when the cart gets caught on the trailer hitch and they are dragged behind the RV at high speed until the cart is flung off into a tree when the Andersons round a corner. In The Good Deed she is seen sitting down with Tom, watching Beavis and Butthead through a window. The short Tom Anderson's War Stories: Love shows Marcie and Tom first meeting in a medic tent during the Battle of Bloody Ridge, with Tom going into detail on the need for his IV bag to be elevated for proper use. Her appearance could be considered a prototype for King of the Hill character Peggy Hill.
- Max Graham (voiced by Guy Maxtone-Graham) – Leader of the Positive Acting Teens (see Classmates above) and the father of one of their members. His most prominent appearances are in Patsies and Dumb Design. A character of identical appearance and voice is seen returning home after a trip with his family after B&B ring the doorbell twice and run away, then no one answers (Ding Dong Ditch). He also appears as a customer at Burger World who is left waiting at the counter while Butt-Head tries to injure Beavis to get worker's compensation money (Work Is Death). He appears in the crowd in front of Highland High in Beavis and Butt-Head are Dead. A character of identical appearance and voice drives the Municipal Waste Management van past B&Bs house looking for a sewage leak after they break their sewer line digging for oil in the yard (Beaverly Buttbillies). A character of identical appearance and voice is also seen taking his young son trick-or-treating (Bungholio: Lord of the Harvest).
- Dennis (voiced by Gideon Evans) – An alcoholic who addresses Mr. Buzzcut's class on the dangers of alcohol abuse (Dumbasses Anonymous). He tells the class that he lost his home, his family and his business due to his drinking. B&B decide to visit Rolling Hills, the drug and alcohol treatment facility where Dennis attends counseling sessions, hoping that the people there can help them to get beer. After B&B tell the receptionist that they have had trouble getting beer, she places them in Dr. Steve's (see White collar workers below) support group for alcoholics. B&B describe beer in increasingly appealing terms (obviously lifted from commercial advertising) until the entire group walks out of the session to go to a bar down the street. In Garage Band an unnamed character of identical appearance and voice is the manager of a motel looking for a lounge band. B&B watch a program in which a rock musician talks about playing in a garage, which gives them the idea to start a band. The two kick Van Driessen's garage door, then tell him that they need a garage to practice in. Helpful as always, he tries to teach them a couple of chords and then leaves them to play on their own. Beavis plays one chord, yells "You're gonna die!", then he smashes Van Driessen's acoustic guitar on the garage floor. Butt-Head says "We're on our way!" They see a sign at a local motel saying "Band Wanted". They tell the manager that they are a band. He hires them, and he tells them that Metallica (which Beavis gives him as the name of their band) "has a nice ring to it." B&B fail to show up after a disagreement over whose name should be listed first, while the motel manager is left to deal with a large, unruly crowd who have shown up expecting to see Metallica. The sign outside advertises "Metallica, Featuring Beavis and Nut-head".
- Bill (voiced by Julián Rebolledo) – Tom Anderson's next door neighbor, who is putting in a hedge as Tom is repaving his driveway (Steamroller). Bill recommended that Anderson rent a steamroller from Morgan's to do his paving job. While the two of them take a break to drink a beer, B&B take the steamroller (which Anderson has left running because it was difficult to start earlier) and drive it around town looking for Todd. Their destructive path takes them through several yards in the neighborhood, through the main entrance of the Botanical Gardens and through the hallways of Highland High, where they break through the wall of the faculty lounge. By the time Bill and Anderson finish their break B&B have returned the steamroller and turned the engine off, much to Anderson's dismay. B&B have flattened part of Bill's new hedge and spread tar from Anderson's paving project over it. Anderson punches Bill in the resulting argument over paying for the damage. A character with a similar design appears as one of Anderson's friends in "What's the Deal" and "Foreign Exchange," the latter of which he appears as a one-legged amputee. Not to be confused with Bill who runs the bar at the American Legion Hall.
- Dusty (voiced by Clu Gulager) – A golfer friend of Tom Anderson who Tom talks to at the clubhouse of a golf course after losing all of his golf balls – which B&B have taken by hiding ahead of him on the course and then swiping each ball that he hits (Mr. Anderson's Balls). Earlier in the episode Dusty is shown instructing another golfer on his swing, and B&B find his use of terms amusing as possible sexual innuendos ("You're pulling your head on every stroke. Let me see your bag", "Here, take your wood and try using a different grip on the shaft"). When he gives B&B a dollar for three golf balls that they found, this gives them the idea to get more balls to make money. Dusty tells Anderson not to waste his money in the pro shop, that "there are a couple of kids (B&B) selling some nice balls real cheap." Anderson winds up buying his own golf balls back from B&B for one dollar each.
- Concert Girls (both voiced by Tracy Grandstaff) – Two attractive but rogue vixen-like teenage girls, one with long brunette hair and the other with short black hair, first seen at the metal concert Creatures of Rock sitting on their car in the parking lot in Take A Number. They tell B&B "Maybe we can rage together." B&B mistakenly believe that they can get tickets for the concert even though they have no money. They talk with a slight surfer/valley girl like twang, and share quite a bit in common with Beavis and Butthead, from metal music to being into what is "cool" – and not appearing to be terribly bright. They play a small integral role in the video game Virtual Stupidity. Though laid back and with affinity for the duo, they are also wily and tricky, having tied up and tricked the duo into getting locked in the trunk of Todd's new car and then running off, stealing Leroy's thugs' motorcycles for a thrill.
- Dave (voiced by Mike Judge) – A balding Lynyrd Skynyrd fan who first appeared in Mike Judge's animated short "The Honky Problem." He has a major role in "Way Down Mexico Way" as a drug mule and has cameos in "Peace, Love, and Understanding," "The Butt-Head Experience," and "Our Founding Losers," each time saying his catchphrase from "The Honky Problem," "play some Skynyrd, man!"
- Christine (voiced by Christine Walters) – A nude model who Beavis and Butt-Head ogle in "Figure Drawing." She also appears as a customer at the mall in "Career Day" who is harassed by Beavis and Butt-Head as well as the security guard who is mentoring them.
- Donna/Shawna (voiced by Rachael MacFarlane and Toks Olagundoye) is Old Beavis and Butt-Head's next door neighbour; as the constant target of their advances, she despises them both. Her name was changed from Shawna to "Donna" in the episode "New Couch".
- Philena (voiced by Ally Maki) - Another female neighbor of Old Beavis and Butt-Head who calls upon them for plumbing help. After they fail to help her, she gets professional help from Old Todd.

== Local business figures ==
- Burger World Manager (voiced by Mike Judge) – The duo's unnamed manager at Burger World, who they refer to as "that manager dude." Like the boys' other authority figures, he often gets frustrated with their idiocy, with his attempts at instilling discipline proving futile. In Work Is Death, he ends up getting seriously injured by their irresponsibility in their futile attempt to receive worker's compensation. In Bathroom Break, he goes outside to urinate in the parking lot due to Beavis and Butt-Head hogging the bathroom while doing nothing where he is caught by the police and charged with public urination and indecent exposure. This leads him to run from the cops, who follow close behind. The episode ends as the police call for backup and chase him, so it is unknown if he is caught and arrested. Despite his frustrations, he seems to be one of the few adults who appreciates Beavis and Butt-Head, considering the fact that they have yet to be fired for their many antics. He is replaced by a slightly slimmer and less tempered African American manager voiced by Jayden Libran in seasons 9 and 10.
- Maxi-Mart Owner (voiced by Toby Huss) – This working stiff wears a middle-part hairstyle and he is habitually annoyed by Beavis and Butt-Head. The duo often loiter in and around his convenience store while trying to pick up chicks. He occasionally exacts a small measure of revenge. He sells Butt-Head day-old insect-infested nachos in Beavis and Butt-Head vs. the Vending Machine, and used forks and stale donuts (picked out of the trash can) in Party. One such attempt backfires when he calls the police to report a robbery in progress after Butt-Head goes behind the counter and works the cash register while he is in the back office (Another Friday Night). When the police arrive they mistake him for the robber, and he is beaten and then arrested. In Skin Trade B&B try to trade a dead squirrel to him for some nachos, because they are convinced that the fur is valuable. He gives them the nachos to get them to go away. An unnamed character of similar appearance is a customer service representative at Home Labyrinth (a parody of Home Depot) who Tom Anderson asks for the location of Spanish tiles for his new pool cabana (Pool Toys). His annoyed response ("I told you two hours ago...") indicates that Anderson has asked him the same exact question earlier. Anderson is shown roaming around the store after it closes, the elusive Spanish tiles on a shelf above him, grousing about "that damned hippie clerk" and his vehicle is towed away. Voiced by Rottilio Michieli.
- Clark Cobb (voiced by Mike Judge) – A parody of Christian Televangelists and voiced to sound like H. Ross Perot. The owner of Cobb's Family Hardware is a card-carrying member of the Christian Businessmen's Association. He has a sock puppet named Socko, which he uses to try to teach evangelical lessons. He uses a similar sock puppet to talk to trick-or-treaters in Bungholio: Lord of the Harvest. When Daria cons B&B into pledging a large amount of money for a CBA-sponsored walk-a-thon, Clark forces the guys to spend a very long time walking off their debt (Walk-a-Thon). He appears in four issues of the spinoff comic, in two cases having charitable events (one done for press attention) turn destructive after Beavis and Butt-Head get involved. A character of identical appearance is shown standing with a group of people in the mall when Japanese exchange student Hiro hocks a loogie that covers the entire group, then he retracts it (Foreign Exchange) and also in a crowd scene in "Jump!". In Inventors the boys stop by his house in an attempt to sell him their new "invention", the Butt Scratcher 2000, which in reality is nothing more than a wire coathanger that Butt-Head has bent into a hook. He tells them, "Boys, that's just a wire hanger. You know it, I know it and the Lord knows it." Cobb features prominently in Whorehouse, when he organizes a group of Christian activists to protest outside an abortion clinic. He repeatedly chants "Whores! Fornicators!" through his megaphone. B&B interpret this to mean that the establishment is in fact a brothel, and they join the protest in hopes of "scoring". Both they and Cobb are shocked with a taser by a security guard for walking off the public sidewalk onto clinic property. It is revealed in the book Ensucklopedia that he chose to open a hardware business because Jesus Christ was a carpenter.
- Bill (voiced by Clu Gulager) – A heavy-set old man who runs the bar at the American Legion hall that Tom Anderson frequents. They were both in the military. Although he never actually meets Beavis and Butt-Head, he unwittingly contributes to their antics. When Bill asks Anderson to watch the bar for a few hours (Yard Sale), Anderson puts Beavis and Butt-Head in charge of his yard sale. While Anderson is gone, the two sell everything inside his house for $60. In Pool Toys, Anderson brags to Bill that he has found a couple of good workers (B&B) to help around the yard. Bill shares physical characteristics with the similarly named Billy Bob and whether he is a less cartoonish version of the same character is unclear.
- Ric Aaron Joseph (voiced by Jamie Brickhouse) – A photographer whose most prominent role was in Dude, A Reward, in which B&B find his lost photography equipment in a local park. The duo take crude, closeup photographs of their own body parts (up their nostrils, down the front of their pants, etc.) before breaking the equipment, then returning it for the reward money. Joseph displays the photos as his own work in a photographic exhibition, winning critical acclaim from those who view them as a work of genius. He is also depicted as the photographer for class pictures for Highland High (Tainted Meat) and as an art instructor (Figure Drawing).
- Madame Blavatsky – From the episode of the same name, she is a fortune teller who speaks in a faux-East European accent. She attempts to tell Butt-Head's future. Beavis seizes her crystal ball and describes a war scene, which she interprets as him having psychic powers and foreseeing the end of the world ("The boy has the sight"), but it is only the reflection of a news broadcast on the television behind him. Her character is based on a real person of Russian origin, Helena Blavatsky.
- Mr. Blackstone (voiced by Mike Judge) – The owner and operator of Sunny Grove Nudist Colony (Naked Colony). B&B visit Sunny Grove after seeing an ad for it in an adult magazine at Maxi Mart, hoping to see naked women. They talk to Mr. Blackstone (who is naked sitting in his office), and they leave after he mentions the $4,000 annual membership fee. They later climb the wall around the facility and hide behind shrubs as they observe various nudist activities. A woman named Donna approaches them to give them information about the facility. They remain behind the shrubs, their wide-eyed gazes still fixed on the same spot, long after it has gotten dark and everyone else has gone inside.
- Mr. O'Brien (voiced by Dale Reeves) – The man who administers polygraph examinations at Big Eye Systems (Liar! Liar!). The manager at Burger World sends B&B there to be tested because of money missing from the cash register. Butt-Head, taking his own advice regarding the "trick" to taking such tests by holding his breath, passes out when he is asked if he has ever stolen anything in his life. Beavis' test follows Butt-Head's. His random statement to get a baseline reading, "I killed a bunch of people once", is interpreted by the machine as true. This leads to him being identified on the news as the "Hippie Ripper" who perpetrated the In-A-Gadda-Da-Vida slayings in 1969 (undoubtedly a reference to the Charles Manson "Helter Skelter" killings in Hollywood the same year), which were committed before Beavis was born. The police explain this away by saying, "He's very clever." He is named after a character in George Orwell's novel 1984.
- Julia (voiced by Tracy Grandstaff) – The technician at Big Eye Systems who applies the leads for polygraph examinations (Liar! Liar!). She is also named after a character in 1984.
- Dating Service Manager (voiced by Christine Walters) – This unnamed woman runs Desperate Embrace Dating Service (Vidiots). B&B enter the place looking for dates. She seems oblivious to their insubstantial (and sometimes crass) responses to the dating questionnaire, believing that they are deliberately being funny. She is immediately smitten with Beavis, dropping numerous hints regarding her interest in him. Beavis doesn't pick up on this. He gives her the name "Geraldo" (having earlier seen a Geraldo Rivera program in which a convicted criminal who obtained victims through a dating service says that you shouldn't give your real name when dealing with them – implying that this is why he was caught). Butt-Head makes a video in which he refers to himself as a "pleasure machine". The two forget all of this after returning home. When the manager calls for Beavis (under the name Geraldo), Butt-Head answers the phone and tells her that "There aren't any Mexicans here", then he complains that she "keeps calling for this Gerondo dude." A young woman comes to the door and says that she is "here to turn on the pleasure machine", to which Beavis replies, "The TV works fine now. The remote just needed some new batteries." Then he slams the door, and complains that all the interruptions make it hard to concentrate on scoring.
- Misty Lou (voiced by Mike Judge) – The less-than-enthusiastic woman working the counter at Nation's Finest Yoghourt (Yogurt's Cool). B&B go there after seeing a commercial with an attractive woman licking a cone. When they try to get a refund, the manager points to a sign saying that they are not a participating location. This leads B&B to smear their cones all over the mall.
- Kelly (voiced by Mike Judge) – The ticket attendant at Babes R Us (from the episode of the same name), a club where female mud wrestling matches are held. He turns B&B away because they are underage. When they threaten him, he calls the bouncer Thor (see Other below).

== White collar workers ==
- Attorney Joe Adler (voiced by Mike Judge) – A thinly veiled spoof of real-life Houston personal injury lawyer Jim Adler, Joe Adler is a sleazy lawyer specializing in frivolous lawsuits and personal injury cases. In Sexual Harassment, Beavis and Butt-Head hire him to sue their classmate Kimberly for sexually harassing them by giving them "stiffies". In Whiplash, the boys (influenced by an Adler TV ad) stage an accident with a school bus in order to "get rich" by claiming a whiplash injury. He is then arrested for 257 counts of fraud. He also has a cameo at the airport in Do America. A similar attorney named Joe Adler appeared in Mike Judge's latest film, Extract, portrayed by Gene Simmons.
- Dr. Fisk (voiced by Kristofor Brown) – Highland's town physician appears several times. In Rabies Scare he is shown as a sadistic individual who gives Beavis unnecessary rabies injections in the abdomen. He reattaches Beavis' severed finger in Woodshop (only to have him pull it back off by picking his nose). He appears as a plastic surgeon in Plastic Surgin, in which the duo believe they are getting "wiener implants" when in fact they are getting nose jobs. In the latter episode the name "Doctor Fisk" appears on the office door. He also appears on a television news program as an expert to explain an incident of contaminated meat at Burger World (Tainted Meat). He treats the wounds in Beavis' hands and gives him the pain medication that leads to his manic transformation in Holy Cornholio, and he is shown working at the abortion clinic in Whorehouse, where the duo mistake him for a male prostitute.
- Dr. Leibowitz (voiced by Gideon Evans) – He runs an impotence clinic, which the boys see advertised on television (Impotence). He is a heavy-set balding man with gray hair, wearing a white lab coat. The boys get the idea from the clinic's ad that he can help them "score". After eventually getting annoyed with their antics, he thinks "mankind needs me" and he gives them a bottle of saltpeter to discourage them from breeding. After taking it, the boys do not find the pictures they saw in the office nearly as stimulating.
- Harry Buddisker (voiced by Frank Gresham) A middle-aged balding man with a stubble beard and a chunky appearance, he is a local health department inspector. He enters Burger World around closing time just after Beavis and Butt-Head have thrown all manner of food and drink into the ceiling fan, trashing the restaurant (Closing Time). They call him "Harry Buttwhisker". They feed him fried worms, calling them "seasoned curly fries". He also appears as the father of the bride in Here Comes the Bride's Butt.
- Hamid (voiced by Mike Judge) – Only appears in the new episodes. Works telephone tech support for computers at a company called Co-Techs in Highland (Tech Support). Hamid speaks English with difficulty and a strong Middle Eastern accent ("I have only been working here a short distance"), but he appears to be a hard worker who takes his job seriously. He is frustrated by Beavis' and Butt-Head's poor work ethic and he informs his supervisor that they are not doing their jobs properly, but he is told to emulate them because they get customers off the phones quickly. Following their instructions, he gives advice to a worker at the power plant that leads to the entire city losing electrical power. Hamid also appears as a used car salesman at Tardino's Autos (Used Car). He is fired for allowing the boys to test drive a car (which Butt-Head promptly wrecks by driving it into the building across the street) without first checking for licenses and insurance. Although the boys get it right, his boss at the car lot mispronounces his name, calling him HAM-id.
- Dr. Steve – A counselor at Rolling Hills, a drug and alcohol treatment facility in or near Highland (Dumbasses Anonymous). B&B are put in his support group for alcoholics after telling the receptionist that they have had trouble getting beer (which she apparently misconstrued as alcoholic cravings). They get the idea that someone there can help them to get beer after group member Dennis (see Local Residents above) talks to Mr. Buzzcut's class about alcohol abuse. Dr. Steve tries unsuccessfully to maintain control of the group after B&B convince them to go down the street to a bar to have one drink, and then come right back. As the group leaves, he tells them to "Remember your centers".
- Jay Weidelman – A sales representative for Central Telephone who tries to sell B&B a 900 number, which they pursue at the suggestion of a woman on a phone sex line (1-900-BEAVIS). The boys walk out when they decide that signing their names and writing the date on the application form is too complicated.
- Dentist (voiced by Dale Reeves) – An unnamed orthodontist who Butt-Head sees for adjustments to his braces (Patients Patients). Butt-Head laughs when the dentist asks if he has been wearing his rubber bands and headgear at night. After Butt-Head lashes out and kicks over a tray of instruments, the dentist sedates him with laughing gas, resulting in his mouth being wired shut during the procedure. While Beavis is sitting in the waiting room, the nurse calls him over for an eye examination. His inability to identify any letter complicates him passing the eye test. He finally says "Oh" when the optometrist points to the letter O, but the prescription leaves Beavis with very blurred vision. Beavis says "This is like being in a toilet." When they return to class, Mr. Buzzcut instructs Butt-Head to read the words "sexual intercourse" on the board as their topic of the day, saying that Butt-Head has been waiting his whole life to say it without getting in trouble. When Butt-Head is unable to properly pronounce the words with his mouth wired shut, Buzzcut throws him out of class, thinking he is being uncooperative. He then instructs Beavis to read them, but Beavis' glasses make his vision too blurred to read anything. He is also thrown out of class.
- Sam Gluckman (voiced by Frank Gresham) – A bank officer in the episode "Jump!" who Beavis and Butt-Head briefly talk to when they are trying to get money from the bank. He is soon arrested for embezzlement and runs from the police to the roof of the bank where he threatens to jump. He also appears as the father of the groom in "Here Comes the Bride's Butt" and has a cameo at a banking booth in "Career Day." He is identical in appearance to Harry Buddisker.
- Dr. Rod Johnson (voiced by Mike Judge in season 3 and Jim Meskimen in season 11) - A doctor working at Stork in a Bottle Sperm Bank (later called Highland Fertility Clinic). In "Sperm Bank," he hires Beavis and Butt-Head to sell sperm. He returns much later as an older man in "Depositors" where the duo attempt to sell sperm again but he kicks them out.

== Television/radio personalities ==
Television and radio personalities in Beavis and Butt-Head included:

- Rabid Ron (voiced by Kristofor Brown) – A radio host for local radio station KT&A where Beavis and Butt-Head win a guest DJ spot (Radio Sweethearts). The duo gains popularity with Ron's audience by tactlessly ridiculing him on the air for being an over the hill heavy metal poseur and promising free butt tattoos as a giveaway. Ron's show, which seemingly had almost no audience before the pair guest hosted, is retooled to emulate Beavis and Butt-Head after his audience apparently wants to hear more of them. After hearing the reworked show, Butt-Head remarks "This used to be a pretty cool station until they put these dorks on."
- Gus Baker (voiced by Dale Reeves) – A parody of Rush Limbaugh, Baker mistakenly believes Beavis and Butt-Head to be positive young role models when they call his talk show to praise his advocacy of the death penalty for criminals (Right On). As a result, he brings them on the show to discuss "immoral" music videos. However, their crassness and bad language soon create a commotion, ending with Beavis mooning the camera. Baker's show and his prospective presidential campaign are taken off the air due to the negative public reaction.
- Dan Silver (voiced by Julián Rebolledo) – A parody of self-help guru Tony Robbins (The Miracle That Is Beavis). He gives Beavis a brief motivational speech at a book signing, along with a free copy of his book "Seize The Power". Beavis's assertiveness increases dramatically (much to the aggravation of Coach Buzzcut and Principal McVicker), but it also annoys Butt-Head, who regresses Beavis to his old self with a few smacks across the face.
- Peter Small (voiced by Julián Rebolledo) – A parody of fitness guru Tony Little (Take a Lap), he hosts infomercials for performance-enhancing supplements in such an aggressive manner that it convinces Beavis and Butt-Head to exercise and devise their own supplemental drink – after Butt-Head calls the toll-free number and is disappointed because they are not free. They go to Stewart's house and raid the kitchen for ingredients – including molasses, salsa, flour and canned beans. They trash the kitchen by mixing the ingredients in the blender with the lid off, then leave just as Stewart's parents return home, leaving Stewart to deal with the mess. Peter Small later dies of heart failure brought upon by the strain of defecation.
- Captain Dick Jackman (voiced by Chris Phillips) – A weatherman on a Highland television station, he hosts Teen Talk, a program on which he talks to troubled teens. He unsuccessfully tries to appear tuned in to the lingo of teenagers. Beavis and Butt-Head are sent to appear on the show by Principal McVicker as a disciplinary measure. Earlier in the episode, Jackman covers an event at Highland High at which the school is announcing a canned food drive. The National Honor Society has glued cans together to spell the word "CARES" next to the Highland High sign. When the drape is removed from the cans, it is shown that B&B have rearranged the cans to spell "SUKS" (misspelling "sucks") instead. This event was apparently televised live, as McVicker shows the boys a replay of it in his office before giving them a choice of either going on Teen Talk and confessing, or removing asbestos from the cafeteria. In Tornado, Jackman appears on television with an emergency weather bulletin about a line of tornadoes forming near Highland.
- Wolf Jackal – A parody of reporter Wolf Blitzer of CNN. He is the reporter in the war scene Beavis sees in the crystal ball in Madame Blavatsky.
- Trish Burbee (voiced by Jamie Brickhouse) – The television reporter who covers Butt-Head being extracted from the pipe he is stuck in (The Pipe of Doom)
- Deborah Shea (voiced by Robin Tribus) – The Channel 2 reporter who covers the "labor dispute" at Burger World when Beavis and Butt-Head decide to go on strike (On Strike).
- Jim Baxley (voiced by Sam Macaroni) – The reporter for Channel 7 who covers Beavis' rescue from the top of the copy machine after the glass top breaks as he tries to copy his butt (Copy Machine). An unidentified reporter of identical appearance and voice reports on a train derailment and the resultant toxic gas leak, which causes the evacuation of a 20 square block area of north Highland (Doomsday). He later reports on the vandalism at Stewart's house (perpetrated by B&B, but they believe that their actions were an improvement and someone else did it after they left) during the evacuation. He describes both situations as "apocalyptic". The same character, again not identified, is shown reporting from Highland High when the boys are suspended from school for their actions in support of the Positive Acting Teens' (see Classmates above) opposition to the teaching of evolution (Dumb Design) – although their motives are different from those of the PATs. He is also shown seeking comment from Principal McVicker regarding allegations of cheating on the standardized aptitude test after McVicker enters random answers on the boys' test forms after all they have written in four hours is their names (School Test).
- Dr. Jean Shephard – Described as a "TV psychologist and diet expert", she is interviewed by Jim Baxley to describe the trauma that Beavis faces as a result of being injured by broken glass on top of the copy machine when he tries to copy his butt (Copy Machine).

== Criminals/hooligans ==
- Killer (voiced by Kristofor Brown) – A knife-wielding serial killer who encounters Beavis and Butt-Head after escaping from prison (Most Wanted). He has a jailhouse tattoo of the word "killer" on his forehead, which the duo misread and assume is his name, "Kyler". After being diverted from killing the two due to a confusing conversation about tattoos and Beavis' psychotic ramblings, he gives the duo tattoos on their butts: a picture of a butt with its own butt-shaped tattoo on it. He then turns himself in so that he can give the same tattoo to other inmates. In Vidiots, he appears on a show hosted by Geraldo Rivera about dating services, saying the services were great because he was able to order up his victims, and only regrets that he used his real name in the process. Rivera refers to him as "Tom". In Radio Sweethearts he is shown listening to Beavis and Butt-Head on the radio from his prison cell. A character of similar appearance (but with shorter hair) appears as the mall security guard in Underwear. He relapses into his unstable psychotic self in Virtual Stupidity.
- Killer 2 – In A Great Day, the duo meet with a killer after noticing a trail of blood leading to his front door. He gives them a dollar to go away. Later he is seen putting a dead body into the trunk of a car and when the duo return, he gives them $20. He is never named. He has blond hair and a mustache, and bears a strong resemblance (most likely intentional) to real life serial killer Jeffrey Dahmer. He also has a cameo in Do America as one of the spectators during the car crash, and characters with his model make cameos in other episodes in seasons 7 and 8.
- Ross and Harlan (voiced by Sam Johnson and Toby Huss respectively) – White trash criminals who make their first appearance breaking into the Stevensons' residence to steal their belongings while Beavis and Butt-Head are inside watching pay-per-view television (Stewart Moves Away). Upon encountering the duo they sarcastically pose as professional movers, stealing valuable items while inciting the boys to break less valuable items and to show them where the "good stuff" is. The duo instantly take a liking to Ross and Harlan, never realizing that they are robbers, even after the Stevensons return and Mr. Stevenson yells that they have been robbed. The two criminals play a brief but important role in Beavis and Butt-Head Do America when they break into the boys' house and steal their TV set, thus beginning the duo's cross-country quest for it. They are also the hitmen who Muddy hires to murder his wife. In Tech Support characters of identical appearance are shown driving by in a truck, then driving through the front window of the building and helping themselves to computer equipment after B&B's suggestion to Hamid (who is talking to someone at the power plant) causes the entire city of Highland to lose electrical power.
- Slade (voiced by Mike Judge) – A member of Todd's gang. Slade is stocky with long brown hair, wearing a white T-shirt with cutoff sleeves and blue jeans. He appears in several episodes, Beavis and Butt-Head in Virtual Stupidity, and Beavis and Butt-Head Do the Universe, and only speaks in "Pipe of Doom" where he is seen as part of a construction crew. An older Slade has a cameo in "Plumber's Helpers" as part of Todd's plumbing crew.
- Psycho – Another member of Todd's gang. Psycho is African American and his "name" is only revealed on a trading card. He appears in several episodes, Beavis and Butt-Head in Virtual Stupidity, and Beavis and Butt-Head Do the Universe, and only speaks in Virtual Stupidity.
- Leroy (voiced by Toby Huss) – A local thug who leads a gang that are rivals to Todd. In Safe House, Leroy and two gangbangers go to the duo's house to look for Todd, who is hiding there. After Beavis claims that he and Butt-Head are part of Todd's gang, Leroy and the others beat them up as a "message" for Todd. Shortly afterward, they pound the duo again when they end up in the same jail cell. He and his gang also appear in Virtual Stupidity, where he is found in a cell, and though escapes prison, his gang ends up losing their vehicles and thrown back in prison due to the duo's antics. An older Leroy has a cameo in "Plumber's Helpers" as part of Todd's plumbing crew.
- The Inmates – Inmate 1545976 (voiced by Mike Judge) is a hard-timer who has a prosthetic leg and glass eyeball as a result of his escape attempts and fights. He is ordered by the warden to intimidate Beavis and Butt-Head and other high school students with a profanity-laden tirade during their visit to a prison in a parody of the Scared Straight! video series (Scared Straight). Beavis and Butt-Head are so impressed with him and the two other inmates they meet, that they determine that prison is to their liking. B&B befriend the two inmates they spend time with in a cell, making an instant connection after Beavis compliments the stocky one on his Iron Maiden tattoo. At the end of the episode they are shown trying to sneak back into the prison with a group of students who are arriving just as their own bus is about to leave.

== Political figures ==
- President Bill Clinton (voiced by celebrity impersonator Dale Reeves) – President Clinton appears in Citizen Butt-Head. He meets Beavis and Butt-Head, befriends them, and proclaims them "Students of the Year". He also appears in Beavis and Butt-Head Do America, making them honorary ATF agents for retrieving the X5 bioweapon.
- Betsy Wiener (voiced by Tracy Grandstaff) – A parody of Tipper Gore and the Parents Music Resource Center. She is a member of the group "Decency in Media". She blames music videos for actions that result in the duo being struck by lightning (Lightning Strikes). In actuality, they were influenced by a PBS documentary on Benjamin Franklin and his famous kite experiment, but Betsy uses their description of Franklin – "some old dude with long hair and glasses" – to insinuate that they were influenced by Howard Stern.

== Religious figures ==
- Charlie (voiced by Chris Phillips) – Beavis and Butt-Head's guardian angel, who regards them as his greatest disappointment. He appears in a Christmas special in It's a Miserable Life, a twisted spoof of It's a Wonderful Life. Charlie attempts to convince Butt-Head to commit suicide by showing him what Highland would be like if he had never existed. Tom Anderson, Principal McVicker, Daria, Burger World, Stewart, and even Beavis are all much better off without Butt-Head, but Butt-Head does not see it that way. Charlie falls off the bridge and is carried away by a current after failing to convince the duo to kill themselves.
- Saint Peter – Beavis meets Saint Peter at the pearly gates after he apparently dies (The Final Judgement of Beavis). Later it is revealed that Beavis was merely dreaming after knocking himself unconscious running into the side of the house trying to imitate the movie "Iron Justice" (a parody of RoboCop). After Beavis mistakes him for Santa Claus, St. Peter begins a lengthy review of Beavis's life detailing his frequent acts of mischief, including urinating in the gym, passing out chocolate laxatives in his kindergarten class, mutilating an action figure "in a most disturbing manner" and "touching himself in an impure manner". He goes so far as to call Beavis "butt-munch", and eventually denies him entrance into heaven.
- Hank – Leader of a religious cult posing as God (Beavis and Butt-Head Meet God), he resides in a complex where Beavis and Butt-Head are brought after cult members pick up the duo hitchhiking. They are confined to living quarters with no television. They promptly escape to join Hank in his room, where the three sit on a couch and enjoy heavy metal music videos together.
- The Beloved (AKA Myron Turtlebaum) (voiced by Kristofor Brown) – Leader of a religious cult called Center for the New Arcana located near Highland (Holy Cornholio). Following the death of The Beloved, his followers mistake Beavis (in the midst of a painkiller-induced Cornholio fit) as the reincarnation of their lost leader. Cult members interpret the holes in Beavis' hands from overtightening a screw into an action figure at Stewart's house as "the stigmata", and his nonsensical Cornholio babblings as speaking in tongues. They also believe Butt-Head to be a prophet. The Arcana cult apparently involves sexual activity between The Beloved and his many female devotees, including a mysterious ceremony called The Great Conception. Beavis's incessant demands for toilet paper perplex the cult, and the duo's short attention spans ultimately prevent them from "scoring" (despite the cult's willingness). The cult tracks Beavis back home, arriving to take him to The Great Conception while Stewart is standing at the front door. Beavis tells them, "He's The Beloved now. Go bother him." Then, much to Stewart's delight, they lead him away to participate in the sexual ceremony.

== Other ==
- Ken Alder (voiced by Mike de Sève) – A graduate student in film and anthropology who visits Mr. Van Driessen's class to talk to them about doing a documentary film on troubled teens. He picks Beavis and Butt-Head as the subjects for his film, entitled Generation in Crisis (from the episode of the same name). In the film they are called Steven (Beavis) and Bernard (Butt-Head). They are shown staring at an armadillo that has been run over on the road, watching music videos at home, and engaging in other forms of general loitering.
- Thor – Appears in some of the earliest episodes. His physical stature is reminiscent of a gorilla. He is often summoned to deal with Beavis and Butt-Head when they are being disruptive at a place of business (i. e., At the Sideshow, Babes R Us). This involves him grabbing the duo by their ankles and repeatedly slamming them to the ground.
- Sergeant Dick Leakey (The Rooster) (voiced by Mike Judge) – A soldier in a recruiting office who tries to convince Beavis and Butt-Head to join the Army (Be All You Can Be). After luring them inside with a promise to let them touch his grenade launcher and then showing them a video about how the Army uses heavy metal music to scare the enemy, he tries to force them to enlist at gunpoint. They sign the enlistment forms as "Major Woody" and "Private Parts". The enraged sergeant pulls the trigger several times, but the gun is not loaded (the duo having stolen the bullets along with a live hand grenade) and it clicks harmlessly as the boys run away.
- Katya (voiced by Nataliya Zurabova) – She appears in Bride of Butt-Head, in which the boys find an ad for a mail-order bride in a magazine. Butt-Head calls, claiming to be "a rich American with a big wiener". He is put on hold while the manager of the company talks to Katya, a Russian mail-order bride who is disappointed that her current "husband" is not rich as promised. Growing tired of her complaints, after a flash of inspiration, the manager matches her with Butt-Head, telling her (yet again) that he has a rich American man for her, even offering to pay her transport fees. Once Katya arrives, all Butt-Head is interested in is "doing it", much to her irritation. At one point Katya uses the duo's phone to call someone in Moscow (with the implication that she will be running up a large telephone bill), and can be heard in the background loudly speaking to someone in Russian. Eventually, while out walking with Beavis and Butt-Head, she meets Todd when he pulls up alongside them in his car. Desperately begging Todd to get her away from them, she eagerly gets in his car and latches on to him. At the end of the episode, she and Todd are parked outside the duo's house, loudly having sex in Todd's car; however, B&B are happy about this because they believe this makes them related to Todd.
- Principal Brown – The principal of Wilson Elementary School, where Beavis and Butt-Head are sent after being demoted from ninth grade (Held Back). They fail math in progressively lower grades and thoroughly disrupt a kindergarten class. His kindergarten teacher threatens to quit if he doesn't get them out of her class. Principal Brown contemplates sending them back to pre-school, but he knows that they would just come back through. Beavis and Butt-Head's suggestion to put them in a higher grade "where the chicks have big thingies" gives him an idea to get rid of them. He brings them back to Highland High, telling Principal McVicker that they are star pupils and they graduated them early – and they are not taking them back. Similar in appearance to Harry Buddisker and Sam Gluckman (see White collar workers above)
- Joan (voiced by Jennifer Emerson) – Mr. Van Driessen's girlfriend in Date Watchers. The two are first seen eating lunch at the mall and sharing similar world views. When Beavis and Butt-Head overhear them in conversation, they excitedly believe that Van Driessen is about to "score". After following the couple to his house, the boys attempt to watch them through a window in the hope that they will have sex. In the middle of an intimate moment, Joan asks Van Driessen to pull down the shades for privacy, which annoys B&B enough that they ring the doorbell. Despite Van Driessen admonishing them for their behavior, they manage to push their way in through the door and demand to watch them have sex. Van Driessen suggests continuing their evening together at Joan's house instead. Undeterred, Beavis and Butt-Head decide to follow them there as well.
- Linda (voiced by Jennifer Emerson) - An attractive redheaded female police officer masquerading as a prostitute in "Feel a Cop." The duo fail to properly proposition her, causing her to blow her cover and entrap them.
- Jasmine (voiced by Jennifer Emerson) - A punk rock girl who works at "Pencer's Gifts" in "Pierced." After the duo fail to give her actual parental signatures, they badly pierce their ears themselves. She then tells them that they pierced their ears on the "gay" side, causing them to scream in horror. Her name is not stated in the episode but appears in the credits.
- Henry (voiced by Toby Huss) – A homeless man who Beavis and Butt-Head mistake for a werewolf (Werewolves of Highland). Inspired by the Twilight movies and stories of Dracula, they ask him to bite them so that they will become irresistible to women. Instead, they wind up in a hospital with a wide range of infectious diseases. His voice is identical to Spongy, a similar homeless character from Mike Judge's show King of the Hill.
- Megan (voiced by Lori Nasso) – A woman who Van Driessen knows from a medieval fair. She is churning butter at Prairie Falls, a recreated homesteading community from 1832 that his class visits on a field trip (Time Machine). B&B fall asleep on the bus and they mistakenly believe that they have gone back in time and that Van Driessen is actually his great-great-grandfather, Tobias Van Driessen. They believe that if they can stop the developing relationship between Megan and Van Driessen, the man they know as their teacher will never be born. They are disappointed upon returning to the school when, after again falling asleep on the bus, they see that Van Driessen is alive.
- Maya Kanigher (voiced by Lori Nasso) – An environmental activist working along the shores of the Gulf of Mexico to rescue seabirds soiled by an oil spill (Spill). Beavis and Butt-Head sign up to go along with volunteers from Mr. Van Driessen's class because he tells them about the "chicks" that are "filthy" – which they interpret to mean women with whom they can easily "score" rather than baby birds covered with oil. She seems oblivious to the duo's repeated sexual innuendoes and their misinterpretation of her instructions about cleaning the birds as an invitation to fondle her.
- Second Lieutenant Decker – An Army officer at Fort Sawyer who takes part of Mr. Van Driessen's class on a tour of the base to acquaint them with possible military careers (Drones). He contradicts several things Van Driessen tells his class about the "peaceful" mission of today's Army, as well as his statement as they are about to depart that they need a solid high school education.
- Crystal (voiced by Pamela Adlon) – A porn star who misinterprets Beavis' eye twitching after being sprayed in the face with a carbonated drink as tweaking, a repetitive movement often caused by drug use (Holding). She asks him if he is "holding" (carrying drugs). Beavis, obviously unaware of the meaning, tells her that he is. Increasing the misunderstanding, she tells him "I really need to score", which B&B interpret as have sex. She and her companion Sapphire take the boys in their van from Maxi Mart to the house where her next movie is being filmed, assuming that the boys will sell them drugs once they get there. B&B believe that they are about to be paid for having sex with the women.
- Sapphire (voiced by Pamela Adlon) – Crystal's companion, who she describes as a fluffer (Holding).
- Gary (voiced by David Herman) – The director of the adult movie that Crystal is starring in (Holding). He is apparently filming in a bedroom at his mother's house, judging from her repeated verbal interruptions outside the door, much to Gary's increasing annoyance. When B&B arrive, he refers to them as "the stars of the party". He believes that they are bringing drugs for everyone, and they believe that he is referring to them being porn stars (which they believe they are about to become). He is arrested along with his mother, another man named Tim, and the two women (Crystal and Sapphire), when police raid the "set" and find B&B, who are under 18. B&B are placed in protective custody by the police.
- Xander (voiced by John Ales) – The male of a Gothic couple getting married under the tent that Butt-Head knocks down with a training drone (Drones). The corner of the collapsing tent crushes the wedding cake, causing him to call off the wedding, much to the relief of the bride-to-be's parents.
- Cassandra – The female of a Gothic couple getting married under the tent that Butt-Head knocks down with a training drone (Drones). Not to be confused with B&B's long time classmate of the same name (see Classmates above). She has no dialogue.
- Mr. Post (voiced by David Koechner) – A homeless man who B&B mistake for a fugitive who has skipped bail (Bounty Hunters). After mistaking a bouncer shopping at Stromberg Hardware for Dog the Bounty Hunter, they get the idea to become bounty hunters themselves. The bouncer tells them that photos of the most wanted fugitives are in the post office. They walk past the fugitive photos and find a photo (under Volunteers of the Week) of a youth karate class at Clifton Karate School. After B&B go to the school and try to arrest the entire class, the instructor knocks both of them down with karate moves. Defeated, they return to the post office. They first take down a photo of President Barack Obama. They ask a postal employee if he has seen him, and they are told that he is in Europe attending a summit. Discouraged by the distance, they then take down a picture of the Postmaster General. Butt-Head misreads the engraved plate on the picture frame and he believes that "Post" (rhyming with "lost") is the man's name. They spot a homeless man who only vaguely resembles the man in the photo, then they try to take him to jail. They wind up riding in his cart as they go uphill. He knows exactly where the jail is, correcting B&B's wrong directions. After Beavis makes an insulting remark to the police officer at the jail and she stands to confront them, Butt-Head pulls out his pepper spray and accidentally shoots Beavis in the face as the officer sprays him. Beavis shoots himself in the face with pepper spray, and the homeless man falls on the floor laughing.
- Immigration agent (voiced by Joel McKean) – This unnamed federal officer visits Burger World to see if there are any illegal immigrants working there (Vaya Con Cornholio). Beavis, having assumed his Cornholio persona after drinking excessive quantities of Volt Cola (a parody of Jolt Cola), is babbling nonsensically as he paces back and forth by the grill, which he has covered with meat patties to "prepare a feast before the Almighty Bunghole". The agent asks Butt-Head what language Beavis is speaking, before asking Beavis (in Spanish) whether he speaks Spanish, to which Beavis replies "Español? Es bunghole!". Beavis leaves the restaurant through a rear exit. The agent follows him outside, and asks him (in Spanish) if he has a green card. Beavis repeats back what he says, adding some Spanish-sounding words. He is taken to the Immigration office, where he is eventually put on a bus to be deported to Mexico. Upon arrival, it is apparent that the people on the bus have heard his incessant demands for toilet paper as they mutter about it as they leave. Beavis steps off the bus and asks no one in particular, "Is this Nicaragua?" before making rambling statements about "TP" (toilet paper). He has an identical appearance and voice to the cop in "Citizens Arrest".
- Massage Workers (voiced by David Herman) – Two Asian massage workers appear in the episode Massage. They work at the mall performing chair massages. Most of their customers seem to be young women. When they take a break, Beavis and Butt-Head take over, hoping to get a chance to touch women. The workers return, angry because the boys are trying to take their business. The workers hire them on the spot to massage a massively obese man (possibly Billy Bob) just as mall security and the police ask them if they work there before arresting them for stealing supplies for a makeshift massage chair that they had assembled earlier.
- Lidia (voiced by Mary Holland) - A woman from Phoenix, Arizona who mistakes Beavis and Butt-Head's house for an Airbnb in the episode "Bed and Breakfast."
- W. Mason (voiced by Jim Meskimen) - Highland's chief of police who first appears in "Oldholio" where he lets Old Beavis get away with stealing pharmaceutical drugs from a Rite All because he has several of the same medical conditions as Beavis. Later appears in the regular timeline in "Body Cam" where he destroys footage of Beavis causing mass damage around town while wearing a bulletproof vest he stole from Shirley Beavis' boyfriend.

== Do America characters ==
- Muddy Grimes (voiced by Bruce Willis) – The unloved husband of Dallas Grimes. Believing Beavis and Butthead are hitmen, he hires them to murder his ex-wife Dallas, while the boys believe they'll be paid to "score" with her. When his real hitmen arrive, he is furious and vows to kill the two boys. Muddy meets with and nearly shoots B&B in the desert before they tell him that Dallas means to meet them in Washington, leading Muddy to gladly put the boys in the trunk of his car and drive off. When he confronts Dallas at a parking garage in Washington, he is once again mad at the duo when he finds them missing from his trunk, but is seduced by Dallas and has sex with her in his car before they are both arrested for indecency.
- Dallas Grimes (voiced by Demi Moore) – A beautiful, crafty arms dealer who steals the bio-weapon X-5, and uses Beavis and Butthead to take it to the US Capitol in exchange for sex, although really seeking to retrieve the unit and eliminate the duo. Before being able to meet B&B at the Capitol, she is confronted by her ex-husband Muddy. She seduces Muddy and has sexual intercourse with him before they are both arrested for indecency. Muddy thinks that they are back together, although it turns out that Dallas just seduced him to not kill her and betrays him believing that she'll be let free if she helps the ATF put Muddy away for life, only to suffer the same fate and they are both placed under arrest, especially given their past crimes.
- Martha the Old Woman (voiced by Cloris Leachman) – A kind old woman that Beavis and Butthead meet on a plane and later on the tour bus. Her name Martha is in the script but she is unnamed in the movie itself.
- Jim (voiced by Kristofor Brown) – Martha's husband who accompanies her on the tour bus. His voice is similar to that of the Janitor/Farmer, though much less menacing. A lookalike sits at the VFW bar in "Yard Sale," can be seen at the mall in "Underwear," and even makes cameos in the revival series in "Polling Place" and "Old Man Beavis."
- Agent Flemming (voiced by Robert Stack) – A ruthless agent at the Bureau of Alcohol, Tobacco and Firearms who mistakes B&B for criminal masterminds, placing them on the FBI's most wanted list. He leads multiple searches for them, often involving thorough cavity searches of innocent bystanders. When Tom Anderson throws Beavis' pants out of his camper and thus releases the X-5 unit, which is retrieved by Butthead, Flemming accuses him of framing the boys and arrests him and his wife with Dallas and Muddy Grimes.
- Mötley Crüe Roadies – The biological fathers of Beavis and Butthead. The two were roadies for Mötley Crüe, but eventually turned drifters and "scored with two chicks" (presumably the mothers of B&B) in Highland (although Butthead's father claims that Beavis' did not score). They meet B&B in the desert and bond, but fail to realize their obvious herital connection and leave the next morning. Beavis' father is voiced by an uncredited Tony Darling, while Butthead's father is voiced by David Letterman.
- Agent Bork (voiced by Greg Kinnear) – He is Agent Flemming's right-hand man. Throughout the movie, Agent Bork is the man who gets information on the duo such as their biological fathers, their locations, etc.
- Agent Hurly (voiced by Jacqueline Barba) – She is an older woman with short brown hair. She wears a short-sleeved light blue shirt and dark blue pants with a black belt.

== Do the Universe characters ==
- Serena Ryan (voiced by Andrea Savage) – A former astronaut at NASA who becomes the governor of Texas in the 21st century. She invites Beavis and Butthead to be trained as astronauts after watching them become engrossed in a docking simulator, and the two accept thinking they will "score" with Serena. After the two wreck the Space Shuttle Endeavour and attempt to watch Serena change her clothes through a window, she is enraged and flings them into space. When Beavis and Butthead reappear through a black hole in 2022, Serena attempts to have them killed in fear that they may expose her actions, until she realizes towards the end of the movie that they only wanted to have sex with her.
- Jim Hartson (voiced by Nat Faxon) – A former astronaut at NASA who becomes lieutenant governor of Texas in the 21st century. He is often downtrodden by the higher-up Serena, who dismisses his words and yells at him often. When Serena and the government capture B&B, Hartson, knowing that Serena attempted to kill them in 1998, covertly helps them escape using his car, although they only follow Serena and the others to their house, believing that Hartson wants to stop them from scoring with Serena. When all parties meet at B&B's house, Hartson attempts to report Serena to the FBI before being sucked into a portal.
- Judge Metcalf (voiced by Chi McBride) – The judge at Beavis and Butthead's trial who sentences them to 8 weeks of Space Camp after they wreck the 1998 Highland Science Fair. He reappears in the episode Two Stupid Men.
- Mattison (voiced by Gary Cole) – An agent at The Pentagon who detects Beavis and Butthead's arrival in Galveston and mistakes them for aliens plotting to take over the world. He also frequently appears to be interested in knowing the "position of their sexual organs". He leaves with everyone else after it is realized that B&B were only two horny, human teenagers.
- Smart Beavis and Smart Butthead (voiced by Mike Judge) – Arguably more intelligent versions of Beavis and Butthead from an alternate reality. They repeatedly attempt to convince Beavis and Butthead to go through a portal to save the multiverse, but the two are ignorant of their warnings, seeking to "score" with Serena. When Jim Hartson is accidentally sucked into the portal at B&B's house, thus closing it, Smart B&B realize they could have sent anything through the portal, and apologize for their troubles. In the end, Smart Beavis becomes the first Beavis in the multiverse "to score" after having sex with Serena, offering a journey through space with her in return. In the 2022 revival, they reappear to narrate the Old Beavis and Old Butthead episodes.
