= List of Daria episodes =

American Animated Television series by Glenn Eichler and Susie Lewis

Daria is an American animated television series created by Glenn Eichler and Susie Lewis. The series focuses on Daria Morgendorffer, a smart, acerbic, and somewhat misanthropic teenage girl who observes the world around her. The show is set in the fictional suburban American town of Lawndale and is a satire of high school life, and full of allusions to and criticisms of popular culture and social classes. It aired 65 episodes across five seasons on MTV, from March 3, 1997, to January 21, 2002. Two television movies: Is It Fall Yet? and Is It College Yet?, aired in 2000 and 2002 respectively.

== Series overview ==
Season	Episodes	Originally released	
Season	Episodes	First released	Last released
Pilot		Unaired	
1	13	March 3, 1997	July 21, 1997
2	13	February 16, 1998	August 3, 1998
3	13	February 17, 1999	August 18, 1999
4	13	February 25, 2000	August 2, 2000
5	13	February 19, 2001	June 25, 2001
Films	2	August 27, 2000	January 21, 2002
Specials	2	February 18, 2000	January 14, 2002

== Episodes ==
=== Pilot ===
No.	Title	Written by	Original release date
0	"Sealed with a Kick"	Sam Johnson & Chris Marcil	Unaired
Daria accidentally snaps her pencil and borrows one from classmate and starting quarterback Kevin, who thinks she is trying to get with him. After he confronts her about it, Daria pretends she likes him just to inflate Kevin's ego by doing several gestures, including leaving love notes in Kevin's locker, getting affectionate with him at the pizza parlor (much to head cheerleader and girlfriend Brittany's chagrin) to coming to his house with a batch of homemade heart-shaped cookies. Finally, Kevin asks Daria out in front of the student body, telling Brittany they are through and Daria that it is her "turn". True to Daria's plan, she turns him down cold. Later, Daria and Jane discuss the ordeal over slices of pizza while Daria explains that Kevin having to put up with her airheaded sister is the best form of revenge she could possibly serve.

=== Season 1 (1997) ===
No. overall	No. in season	Title	Directed by	Written by	Original release date	Prod. code
1	1	"Esteemsters"	Ken Kimmelman & Paul Sparagano	Glenn Eichler	March 3, 1997	101
Daria Morgendorffer moves with her family from Highland, Texas, to a suburb called Lawndale in an unnamed state, where her sister Quinn gains instant popularity. Unaccustomed to her intelligence and sarcastic wit, Lawndale High School gives Daria a psychological exam because they assume she has low self-esteem, and assign her to a special class for kids with low self-esteem. There she meets student artist extraordinaire Jane Lane, a girl who shares her sense of humor, her disdain for suburban banality, and her love for the fictional tabloid TV show Sick, Sad World.
2	2	"The Invitation"	Karen Disher	Anne D. Bernstein	March 10, 1997	102
Grateful for Daria's help in art class, dimwitted cheerleader Brittany invites her to a party held by the popular crowd in a gated community. Daria is not interested until she realizes that her presence there might be the perfect opportunity to humiliate Quinn, and takes Jane with her.
3	3	"College Bored"	Margaret E. Rutherford	Sam Johnson & Chris Marcil	March 17, 1997	103
After meeting clients who are preparing their 3-year-old daughter for college, Helen and Jake fear that Daria and Quinn will not be prepared and force them into Lawndale High's college-prep course and take them on a tour of Middleton College, their alma mater. They find that college life has changed since their day, and the girls get caught up in different activities during their guided tour.
4	4	"Cafe Disaffecto"	Eric Fogel	Glenn Eichler	March 24, 1997	104
Lawndale's local Internet café has a break-in, and Mr. O'Neill thinks he can prevent future vandalism and theft by restoring it as one of the hip coffeehouses of the 1960s, and Daria is forced to join the other students into raising money for repairs and later to read one of her essays onstage.
5	5	"Malled"	Ken Kimmelman & Paul Sparagano	Neena Beber	March 31, 1997	105
Mrs. Bennett takes her economics class on a field trip to the Mall of the Millennium. Daria and Jane want nothing to do with this trip, but have no way out of it; however, all is not lost when Daria discovers Quinn and the rest of the Fashion Club skipping school there.
6	6	"This Year's Model"	Karen Disher	Glenn Eichler & Laura Kightlinger	April 7, 1997	106
A modeling agency comes to Lawndale High looking for new talent. Quinn participates while Daria is disgusted with the arrangement and looks for a way to kick them out.
7	7	"The Lab Brat"	Chris Prynoski	Peggy Nicoll	April 14, 1997	107
As part of a project for Ms. Barch's (the man-hating science teacher whose lessons are peppered with rants about her messy, bitter divorce) science class, Daria is paired with Kevin (the dumb, but loveable football player for Lawndale High) while Brittany (Kevin's cheerleader girlfriend) is paired with Charles "Upchuck" Ruttenheimer III, the class sleazeball who blackmails Brittany into being his partner.
8	8	"Pinch Sitter"	Karen Disher	Anne D. Bernstein	June 9, 1997	108
Desperate to avoid a meeting with a family therapist, Daria gets stuck baby-sitting two children for Quinn. The sickeningly-sweet Lester and Lauren Gupty have raised their kids Tad and Tricia into brainwashed little angels who only watch The Weather Channel on television and avoid all sugar and junk food. It will take an artist extraordinaire (yes, Jane) to rescue Daria from this nauseous night and the Gupty kids from their sheltered lifestyle.
9	9	"Too Cute"	Eric Fogel	Larry Doyle	June 16, 1997	109
Quinn decides on getting rhinoplasty after seeing a girl in class named Brooke get it (as well as lipsuction and collagen lip injections), but the only way Quinn can get the nose job is if Daria gets plastic surgery to look like Quinn.
10	10	"The Big House"	Karen Disher	Sam Johnson & Chris Marcil	June 30, 1997	110
Helen and Jake set up ground rules for Daria and Quinn after both come home late. When Quinn breaks the rules, the girls are tried in "family court" and grounded for a month. Meanwhile, Lawndale High is holding their annual Classic Rock DJs vs. Teachers indoor hockey game and all the students place bets on whether or not their high-strung history teacher, Mr. DeMartino, will have another heart attack like he did last year during his fight with Rock 'n Roll Randy. Daria violates her punishment but coldly convinces her parents that they'll suffer much more than her if she can't leave the house.
11	11	"Road Worrier"	Eric Fogel	Anne D. Bernstein	July 7, 1997	111
Daria and Jane hitch a ride to the Alternapalooza Festival with Jane's brother Trent (on whom Daria harbors a definite crush) and his vacant bandmate Jesse, with Jane paying for the van's gas. The Fashion Club and other Lawndale students try to go to Alternapalooza as well, but decide that outlet mall shopping is a better use of their time.
12	12	"The Teachings of Don Jake"	Karen Disher	Glenn Eichler	July 14, 1997	112
The Morgendorffers go on a chaotic camping trip to help alleviate Jake's mounting stress the same weekend Trent and Jane attend their family reunion.
13	13	"The Misery Chick"	Karen Hyden, Paul Sparagano & Machi Tantillo	Glenn Eichler	July 21, 1997	113
After an obnoxious local celebrity (alumni quarterback Tommy Sherman) dies on a visit to Lawndale High, everyone seeks counsel from Daria about being miserable. Meanwhile, Jane is being strangely distant, and Daria thinks she knows why; eventually she goes to Jane's to confirm her suspicion.

=== Season 2 (1998) ===
No. overall	No. in season	Title	Directed by	Written by	Original release date	Prod. code
14	1	"Arts 'N Crass"	Karen Disher	Glenn Eichler	February 16, 1998	201
Daria and Jane create an iconoclastic poster for a contest depicting a teenage girl who keeps her perfect image through bulimia, but Ms. Li and Mr. O'Neill keep urging Daria and Jane to change the artwork into something more positive, leading Daria and Jane to commit vandalism to save their work. Meanwhile, Jake loses his job as a consultant after a failed project and is desperate to find a new client.
15	2	"The Daria Hunter"	Eric Fogel	Peggy Nicoll	February 23, 1998	202
Lawndale High goes on another field trip, this time to a local paintball course, with Helen and Jake as parental chaperones. Everybody's true savage natures are revealed on this trip, from Ms. Li and Helen arguing about Daria's attitude to Sandi thinking Quinn is out to steal her role as head of the Fashion Club to Ms. Barch falling in love with a man (Mr. O'Neill) for the first time in 22 years to Jake and Mr. DeMartino sharing whiskey and traumatic childhood memories. Meanwhile, Daria and Jane ditch the paintball trip to go to a museum dedicated to a great white shark that turns out to be a tourist trap run by a deranged woman whose story about her encounter with the great white feels awfully familiar.
16	3	"Quinn the Brain"	Sue Perrotto	Rachel Lipman	March 2, 1998	203
Quinn needs a quick passing grade in English, and ends up accidentally writing an impressive essay (by Lawndale standards, that is), but fears that it might give her a reputation as a nerd. Instead it gives her a new following as a trendy intellectual, something that true intellectual Daria cannot stand, especially since she knows the true Quinn. Since desperate times call for desperate measures, Daria is willing to consider such extreme measures to persuade her sister to give up this façade.
17	4	"I Don't"	Tony Kluck	Peter Gaffney	March 9, 1998	204
Daria and Quinn are ordered to be bridesmaids in their cousin Erin's wedding. There, Daria finds a kindred spirit in her Aunt Amy, Helen's younger sister.
18	5	"That Was Then, This Is Dumb"	Sue Perrotto	Anne D. Bernstein	March 16, 1998	205
Helen and Jake's old hippie friends Willow and Coyote Yeager visit, causing them to doubt their own value system. Daria and Quinn stick around to use their protest activities against them (and so Quinn can flirt with their son, Ethan... or at least try to), until Jane invites Daria to help Trent and Jesse sell their parents' old records at a flea market.
19	6	"Monster"	Eric Fogel	Neena Beber	March 23, 1998	206
Daria and Jane follow Quinn around for a day, for a school video project and the irresistible opportunity to expose her shallow personality, but pull their punches and then watch as Quinn ends up more beloved than ever. Meanwhile, Jake transfers his old childhood films to video and gets hung up on a clip of him as a child falling off a bike with no one bothering to help him up.
20	7	"The New Kid"	Tony Kluck	Sam Johnson & Chris Marcil	March 30, 1998	207
While working on the yearbook staff, Daria meets new student Ted, a sheltered, formerly home-schooled teen with a combination of arcane knowledge and extreme naïveté whose proposed changes to the year book do not go over well with everyone.
21	8	"Gifted"	Karen Disher, Eric Fogel & Tony Kluck	Peggy Nicoll	June 29, 1998	208
Daria and Jodie are invited to tour an elite school for gifted students ahead of being invited to enroll, but neither of them like the place much. Helen and Jake meet Jodie's wealthy and conservative parents and don't make a good impression. Meanwhile, Quinn stays over with her friends...until they all kick her out and Quinn ends up with a disgusted Jane.
22	9	"Ill"	Sue Perrotto	Peter Gaffney	July 6, 1998	209
The recurrence of a mysterious rash lands Daria in the hospital, but her reluctance to inform people of why she is there leads to some outlandish rumors at school.
23	10	"Fair Enough"	Karen Disher, Tony Kluck & Sue Perrotto	Peggy Nicoll	July 13, 1998	210
Ms. Li organizes a Renaissance-Fair fundraiser to repair the library roof (as the money saved up for it was spent on her own personal polygraph machine), and requires students to either participate or purchase a ticket, or else face suspension. During the fair, Jake gets harassed by a surly teenager, Daria and Jane ride a Ferris wheel with a sobbing Stacy, Brittany keeps Kevin from participating in the play by driving far away from the school, and the Three J's try their hand at jousting with Mr. DeMartino, the Black Knight.
24	11	"See Jane Run"	Eric Fogel, Tony Kluck & Sue Perrotto	Rachelle Romberg	July 20, 1998	211
Jane joins the track team, leaving Daria so isolated that she begins talking to herself. Meanwhile, Quinn struggles with wearing painful high heels that make her legs look good.
25	12	"Pierce Me"	Tony Kluck	Neena Beber	July 27, 1998	212
While helping Trent pick out a birthday present for Jane, Daria is talked into getting her navel pierced. Meanwhile, Helen and Quinn prepare for a mother-daughter fashion show being held at the school.
26	13	"Write Where It Hurts"	Karen Hyden, Guy Moore & Gloria DePonte	Glenn Eichler	August 3, 1998	213
Daria finds her special school assignment, writing a short story featuring people she knows, unusually and frustratingly difficult; meanwhile, her parents are both going through midlife crises.

=== Season 3 (1999) ===
No. overall	No. in season	Title	Directed by	Written by	Original release date	Prod. code
27	1	"Daria!"	Karen Disher	Glenn Eichler & Peter Elwell	February 17, 1999	307
In a musical episode, a hurricane bears down on Lawndale.
28	2	"Through a Lens Darkly"	Guy Moore	Glenn Eichler	February 24, 1999	301
Daria is reluctantly persuaded to try to wear contact lenses, but she finds them simultaneously physically, socially, and philosophically uncomfortable.
29	3	"The Old and the Beautiful"	Gloria DePonte	Rachelle Romberg	March 3, 1999	302
The new spirit of "volunteerism" is mandatory at Lawndale High. While reading to senior citizens, Daria finds that her unenthusiastic tone makes her just as unpopular at the nursing home as at school.
30	4	"Depth Takes a Holiday"	Tony Kluck	Sam Johnson & Chris Marcil	March 10, 1999	303
In this imaginary tale, Daria is approached by Cupid and the St. Patrick's Day leprechaun, who want her to help them bring the spirits of Christmas, Halloween, and Guy Fawkes Day back to Holiday Island. Cupid zaps Helen and Jake with his "love taser" to keep them out of the way, causing them to become more amorous than ever and forcing Quinn to follow them around to prevent them from what she thinks is their intent to have another child.
31	5	"Daria Dance Party"	Guy Moore	Peggy Nicoll	March 17, 1999	304
Quinn gets roped into organizing the school dance, but when her Fashion Club friends abandon her for it, she fobs the job off on Jane, whose design of the gym is so great that Quinn rushes to take credit for it. As "revenge" for choosing the dance over her ideas, Sandi organizes her own party on the same night as the dance, but it is so boring that the guys who came to it skip out and head for the dance anyway. Meanwhile, Brittany and Kevin have a fight, and convince their friend groups to swear not to go to the dance with the other.
32	6	"The Lost Girls"	Gloria DePonte	Neena Beber	March 24, 1999	305
Mr. O'Neill submits one of Daria's essays to a contest in a teen magazine and she wins. Her prize (if you can call it that) is spending the day with the self-important editor of Val magazine, who spends most of her time trying to hold onto her youth and celebrity contacts and thinks Daria's writing makes her "edgy."
33	7	"It Happened One Nut"	Joey Ahlbum	Rachel Lipman	July 7, 1999	306
Daria's parents force her to get a job and her father finds her one at a peanut stand in the mall. Much to her chagrin, her only co-worker is Kevin. Daria is great at customer service, but the job makes her smell like nuts and requires her to smile, or else customers will not have to pay for their nuts, and she will get the price docked from her paycheck. Quinn lands a job at the pet store and misfortune ensues.
34	8	"Lane Miserables"	Guy Moore	Anne D. Bernstein	July 14, 1999	308
The return of the rest of the Lane family sends Jane, and then Trent, to the Morgendorffers'. But a third visitor begins to shatter Daria's illusions of life with Trent: Monique. But the fact that he breaks up with the girl "every other week" (Jane's words) offers her hope again, although Trent is a deadbeat.
35	9	"Jake of Hearts"	Gloria DePonte	Dan Vebber	July 21, 1999	309
When Jake has a heart attack, his mother comes to the Morgendorffer household to look after him; Quinn is inspired to study to become a cardiologist. Meanwhile, two radio DJs broadcast their show outside Lawndale High with Principal Li's eager permission because she hopes this will raise Lawndale High School's popularity.
36	10	"Speedtrapped"	Joey Ahlbum	Sam Johnson & Chris Marcil	July 28, 1999	310
Daria finally gets her driver's license, just before Jake and Helen take off on a marital retreat. When Jane and Mystik Spiral are pulled over in some hick town and thrown into jail for their inability to pay a traffic fine during an attempted concert tour, Daria must come to the rescue with bail money from the Lane household. To further complicate things, Quinn tags along for the ride and transforms it into more of an adventure than either of them expected.
37	11	"The Lawndale File"	Guy Moore	Peter Elwell	August 4, 1999	311
Secret-service agents visit Lawndale High and urge students to keep an eye out for students that might be different and thus threaten their safety, as well as the safety of the country. Though Daria and Jane become suspect numbers 1 and 2, they actually notice an outbreak of weirdness among their fellow students, faculty members, and even relatives.
38	12	"Just Add Water"	Gloria DePonte & Tony Kluck	Peggy Nicoll	August 11, 1999	312
Daria and Jane are forced to attend a casino-night cruise fundraiser (on a low-budget ship) and figure the best use of that time would be to catch up on sleep after watching an all-night Sick, Sad World marathon. Mr. DeMartino falls victim to his gambling addiction, and the drunken captain passes out at the tiller, causing the ship to crash into a garbage barge. The passengers scramble for the life boat (only one, due to costs) which had previously come loose when Kevin and Brittany made out in it, and got marooned. In the end, everyone must jump ship.
39	13	"Jane's Addition"	Joey Ahlbum, Aaron Augenblick & Tony Kluck	Glenn Eichler	August 18, 1999	313
Daria and Jane's multimedia project for English class hits a snag when Trent, who agreed to do the music, completely slacks off. Meanwhile, Daria fears for her friendship with Jane when she falls for a guy called Tom.

=== Season 4 (2000) ===
No. overall	No. in season	Title	Directed by	Written by	Original release date	Prod. code
40	1	"Partner's Complaint"	Karen Disher	Glenn Eichler	February 25, 2000	401
Daria, Jane, Brittany, and Kevin have respective spats and decide not to work on an economics project together; thus Daria works with Jodie, Jane with Brittany, and Kevin with Mack. All three pairs face prejudice and extortion, and only two of the groups actually remember to work on the project.
41	2	"Antisocial Climbers"	Tony Kluck	Jill Cargerman	March 3, 2000	402
Mr. O'Neill organizes an overnight camping trip in the woods, inspired by their current assignment. Daria and Jane anticipate the worst, which turns out to be correct when the group gets stranded by a snowstorm with no provisions. Meanwhile, Jake and Helen rent a cabin to rekindle their waning romance...and end up housing a near-frozen Mr. DeMartino.
42	3	"A Tree Grows in Lawndale"	Pat Smith	Peter Elwell	March 10, 2000	403
Daria talks Kevin into buying a motorcycle when she sees him buying a leather jacket to impress Brittany, but he settles for a moped. When he is goaded into performing a dangerous stunt, he crashes into a tree, spraining his knee and shattering his self-confidence. Without Kevin on the football team, the Lawndale Lions play badly, and any Lawndale High student is unpopular. Even The Fashion Club finds trouble with customer service at Cashman's due to this.
43	4	"Murder, She Snored"	Guy Moore	Peggy Nicoll	March 17, 2000	404
A cheating scandal in Mr. DeMartino's class is fodder for Daria's nightmares, where she dreams that she is accused of killing Kevin, the suspected ringleader, and endures one weird scenario after another based on various TV murder-mystery shows.
44	5	"The F Word"	Tony Kluck	Rachelle Romberg	March 31, 2000	405
Mr. O'Neill encourages his class to pick something to fail at for personal growth, but all they get is misery, grief, and despair; Daria may be forced to supervise Quinn at an upcoming mall fashion exhibit, and Jane is becoming popular enough to replace Brittany as a cheerleader.
45	6	"I Loathe a Parade"	Guy Moore	Dan Vebber	April 7, 2000	406
On an errand for her father, Daria runs into her school's annual parade where she encounters a lost child (Tad Gupty from "Pinch Sitter") and strange feelings on a chance meeting with Jane's boyfriend Tom; the parade gets in her way as she tries to get home with her purchase.
46	7	"Of Human Bonding"	Pat Smith	Anne D. Bernstein	April 14, 2000	407
Jake is excited to attend a franchising conference, hoping to meet a famous franchising genius, but when Helen is unable to attend, Daria decides to go in her place.
47	8	"Psycho Therapy"	Tony Kluck	Neena Beber	June 28, 2000	408
The Morgendorffers attends a weekend retreat at the Quiet Ivy mental-health spa to be evaluated, as Helen is being considered for promotion. Over the course of two days, the Morgendorffers come face-to-face with some very unpleasant aspects of their lives. Quinn starts crushing on one of the doctors and also accidentally gets hypnotized after crashing Daria's session, Jake gets to air his grievances about being a henpecked husband, Helen learns that she is largely unappreciated, and Daria regularly checks up on "Jane cam", a secret webcam Jane set up to document her life, Tom included.
48	9	"Mart of Darkness"	Guy Moore	Rachelle Romberg	July 5, 2000	409
The new discount warehouse store in Lawndale is the place to go out of your mind. Daria, Jane and many others are forced to brave the soul-crushing horror of discount shopping when Daria needs to replace a shoelace that Quinn took to replace the drawstring on her cosmetics pouch, Jane needs to replace some art supplies that Tom consumed, Kevin and Brittany need to get barbecue sauce for the Thompsons' barbecue, the Fashion Club needs some extra cosmetics, and Mr. DeMartino and a woman with glaucoma fight over free cheese-log samples. Tom also goes to the store with Trent and his bandmate to apologize to Jane.
49	10	"Legends of the Mall"	Pat Smith	Peter Elwell	July 12, 2000	410
The Fashion Club tells (sub)urban legends to pass the time while they are stranded in a bad part of town: "The Tale of The Rattling Girl", about a 1960s teenager who starved herself so much that people could hear her bones as she danced; "Metal Mouth", about an angry 1980s metal shop teacher whose new dentures force him to sing "Girls Just Wanna Have Fun"; and "The House of Bad Grades", about a 1950s version of Daria whose death from being locked in a bomb shelter caused future residents of her old house to mysteriously flunk high school.
50	11	"Groped by an Angel"	Tony Kluck	Jonathan Greenberg	July 19, 2000	411
Quinn becomes a believer in guardian angels after watching a television special about them, and although Daria remains skeptical, she is unable to convince Quinn after a series of events seems to validate Quinn's beliefs.
51	12	"Fire!"	Guy Moore	Peggy Nicoll	July 26, 2000	412
The Morgendoffers must temporarily stay in a hotel after Jake causes a house fire, so Daria decides to stay with Jane, but her growing friendship with Tom strains the girls' friendship.
52	13	"Dye! Dye! My Darling"	Karen Disher, Pat Smith & Ted Stearn	Glenn Eichler	August 2, 2000	413
Jane's latest artistic endeavour is to paint tiger stripes in her hair. She recruits Daria's assistance, and botching the job gets her in hot water with Jane, but it is her encounter with Tom that might be the biggest mistake of her life.

=== Season 5 (2001) ===
No. overall	No. in season	Title	Directed by	Written by	Original release date	Prod. code
53	1	"Fizz Ed"	Karen Disher	Glenn Eichler	February 19, 2001	501
Despite Daria and Jane's protests, Principal Li makes a sponsorship deal with a soda company for Lawndale High that gets ridiculously out of hand.
54	2	"Sappy Anniversary"	Guy Moore	Anne D. Bernstein	February 26, 2001	502
Tom seems to have forgotten his and Daria's six-month anniversary, which Quinn points out to Daria, who also had not taken note. Daria is unsure if she is upset at Tom for forgetting, or at her herself for how stereotypical she feels for being upset by it. Meanwhile, Jake is in over his head when he gets a new job for an Internet startup.
55	3	"Fat Like Me"	Ted Stearn	Peggy Nicoll	March 5, 2001	503
Sandi falls down a flight of stairs and breaks her leg, then gains weight while recuperating. She is too embarrassed to return to school, forcing a Fashion Club crisis and Quinn volunteering to coach Sandi's weight-loss regimen. Daria and Jane bet each other on whether the Fashion Club will break up.
56	4	"Camp Fear"	Pat Smith	Jonathan Greenberg	March 12, 2001	504
Daria and Quinn attend a reunion at their old summer camp, Camp Grizzly. Quinn looks forward to reconnecting with old acquaintances, but Daria has nothing but bad memories of the place and her fellow campers. Meanwhile, Trent is thinking of breaking up Mystik Spyral because the band is "getting stale," but is inspired to keep it going after he and Jane visit a nearby rustic couple's home.
57	5	"The Story of D"	Guy Moore	Jacquelyn Reingold	March 19, 2001	505
Daria submits a short story for publication, despite her misgivings about the tale's quality. Mr. O'Neill sees her mailing it, mentions it in class, and suddenly the news is all over school, much to Daria's chagrin. Meanwhile, the Fashion Club is inspired to perform a charitable act – hoping to buy a new mirror for the girls' restroom – they publish a newsletter answering fashion questions and giving fashion forecasts.
58	6	"Lucky Strike"	Ted Stearn	Peter Elwell	March 26, 2001	506
When the Lawndale High faculty goes on strike, Ms. Li hires temporary replacements to keep the school running. When forced to get rid of the substitute English teacher because his ephebophilic behavior (hitting on Tiffany, who did not understand he was making advances), Ms. Li recruits as his replacement the student whose mother was responsible for getting him fired: Daria. Naturally, this embarrasses Quinn.
59	7	"Art Burn"	Pat Smith	Dan Vebber	April 2, 2001	507
Jane gets a job making replicas of established paintings, but grows to feel that this interferes with her artistic creativity.
60	8	"One J at a Time"	Guy Moore	Ron Corcillo & A. J. Poulin	May 21, 2001	508
Quinn decides she needs a steady boyfriend, Jake attempts to catch a squirrel that has been getting into the garbage, and Daria is afraid to act on her mother's suggestion of inviting Tom over for dinner because she is unsure how he will react to her family, especially Jake.
61	9	"Life in the Past Lane"	Ted Stearn	Anne D. Bernstein	May 28, 2001	509
Jane meets and begins dating a boy named Nathan, who is into retro fashion, and seeing them have fun causes Daria to wonder if she and Tom have fallen into a rut. Unfortunately for Jane, Nathan is too obsessed with retro topics and criticizes Jane over small wardrobe anachronisms. Meanwhile, Upchuck's prowess with magic and sleight-of-hand intrigues Fashion Club-member Stacy, who assists him in a magic show at school.
62	10	"Aunt Nauseam"	Pat Smith	Jacquelyn Reingold	June 4, 2001	510
When Daria's Aunt Rita visits, having guilted Helen Morgendorfer to represent Rita's daughter Erin in a prospective divorce, the two sisters dredge up old grudges. While Jake goes into hiding, Daria calls in Aunt Amy to referee, but Amy gets sucked into the fight, leaving Daria and Quinn to do damage control.
63	11	"Prize Fighters"	Guy Moore	Neena Beber	June 11, 2001	511
Daria reluctantly competes for a major software company's academic scholarship, but finds both the company and the idea of being tutored for the finalist interview to be ethically problematic. In addition, she finds herself competing against two other Lawndale students: Jodie and Upchuck.
64	12	"My Night at Daria's"	Ted Stearn	Peggy Nicoll	June 18, 2001	512
Each having been reading for hours, Tom and Daria inadvertently fall asleep in Daria's room, spurring rumors that they are sexually active. Eventually, Daria considers having sex with Tom, but changes her mind.
65	13	"Boxing Daria"	Anthony Davis, Karen Disher & Tom Marsen	Glenn Eichler	June 25, 2001	513
A large refrigerator box revives painful memories in Daria that suggest that she is a burden on her parents by being herself.

== Films ==
Title	Directed by	Written by	Original release date
Is It Fall Yet?	Karen Disher & Guy Moore	Glenn Eichler & Peggy Nicoll	August 27, 2000
Daria (whose friendship with Jane is still strained from the events of "Dye! Dye! My Darling!") spends the summer working at Mr. O'Neill's day camp for "sensitive" kids while struggling with her new relationship with Tom. Meanwhile, Jane spends time at an artists' retreat to try to get over her relationship and friendship problems with Tom and Daria, only to end up nearly getting seduced by a bisexual artist; and Quinn works with a tutor (voiced by Carson Daly) to improve her grades. Other students, meanwhile, spend their vacation in interesting ways: Mack as an ice cream truck driver, Jodie as an assistant to a sleazy congressman, and Kevin and Brittany as inept lifeguards at the community pool.
Is It College Yet?	Karen Disher	Glenn Eichler & Peggy Nicoll	January 21, 2002
With high school graduation nearing, Daria must choose which college to go to and whether or not she should continue her relationship with Tom. Meanwhile, Jane decides to forgo college after the schools she applied for reject her, Quinn gets a job at a restaurant where her new best friend is revealed to have a drinking problem, Kevin tries to keep Brittany from knowing he has to repeat his senior year, Jodie is pressured into going an elite college at her parents' behest when she really wants to go to an all-black school where the student life is a bit more relaxed, and Mr. DeMartino teaches Mr. O'Neill to stand up to Ms. Barch after Barch ropes Mr. O'Neill into a possible marriage.

== Specials ==
Title	Directed by	Written by	Original release date
"Daria: Behind the Scenes"	Karen Disher	Glenn Eichler & Peggy Nicoll	February 18, 2000
Hosted by comedian Janeane Garofalo, this special reveals the process of making the show, introduces us to the voice talent, and shows us how the series came to be.
"Look Back in Annoyance"	Karen Disher	Glenn Eichler & Peggy Nicoll	January 14, 2002
Daria and Jane host this half-hour retrospective special, remembering all the major events of the series during its five-year run, all leading up to the series finale.
