= Geoffrey Arend =

American actor (born 1978)

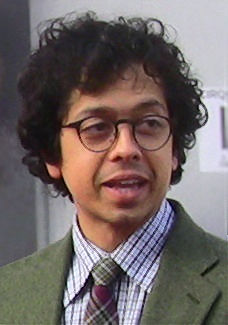
- Arend in September 2011
- Born: February 28, 1978 (age 48)
- Occupation: Actor
- Years active: 1997–present
- Spouse: Christina Hendricks (m. 2009; div. 2019)

Geoffrey Rashid Arend Jr. (born February 28, 1978) is an American actor. He is best known for his role as Ethan Gross on the ABC drama series Body of Proof, Matt Mahoney on the CBS political drama series Madam Secretary, and a young stoner in Super Troopers.

== Biography ==
Arend is the son of Geoffrey D. Arend Sr. and Sabiha Khan Arend, the founders of the trade publication Air Cargo News. His father is an American of German and English descent; his mother is Pakistani. Arend grew up in Hollis, Queens and graduated from New York City's Fiorello H. LaGuardia High School of Music & Art and Performing Arts in 1996.

== Career ==
In 1998, Arend joined the cast of Daria as the voice artist for obnoxious flirt Charles "Upchuck" Ruttheimer III. He would voice Upchuck until the end of the series in 2002, as well as in the video game Daria's Inferno. After the show finished, Arend landed small roles in films such as Super Troopers, where he played a stoner who eats an entire bag of mushrooms to avoid getting caught by the cops after his friend gets pulled over, and Bubble Boy. He played a man with an intellectual disability in the film The Ringer, and then had a supporting role in the romantic comedy (500) Days of Summer.

Arend previously appeared in the medical drama television series Body of Proof, which aired on ABC from March 29, 2011, to May 28, 2013. From 2014 to 2019 he was a member of the main cast of the CBS drama Madam Secretary, playing speechwriter Matt Mahoney.

Arend joined the cast as a series regular in the fourth and final season of the Amazon Prime Video drama television series Goliath, aired fall of 2021.

== Personal life ==
Arend married actress Christina Hendricks on October 11, 2009. It was announced in October 2019 that the couple had separated, with a divorce finalized in December of that year.

== Filmography ==
=== Film ===
Year	Title	Role	Notes
2000	Is It Fall Yet?	Charles "Upchuck" Ruttheimer III (voice)	TV film
2001	Super Troopers	College Boy 3	
2001	Bubble Boy	Flipper Boy	
2002	Is It College Yet?	Charles "Upchuck" Ruttheimer III (voice)	TV film
2003	It Runs in the Family	Malik	
2003	A Tale of Two Pizzas	Johnny	
2004	Garden State	Karl Benson	
2005	Press to Say 2	Temp Agent (voice)	Short subject
2005	The Ringer	Winston	
2006	National Lampoon's Pledge This!	Dax / Mother / Photographer	
2007	Loveless in Los Angeles	Ryan	
2007	Killing Zelda Sparks	Terry Seville	
2008	She Pedals Fast (For a Girl)	Catcaller	Short subject
2008	An American Carol	Mohammed	
2009	Paper Tigers	Meu	Short subject
2009	(500) Days of Summer	McKenzie	
2010	Peep World	Dr. Novak	
2010	Devil	Salesman (Vincent "Vince" McCormick)	
2011	Quirky Girl		Short subject
2012	Save the Date	Kevin	
2014	Beach Pillows	Morgan Midwood	
2014	Worst Friends	Jeremy	
2016	The Angry Birds Movie	Day Care Teacher (voice)	
2019	Batman: Hush	Edward Nygma / Riddler / Hush (voice)	Direct-to-video
2021	Justice Society: World War II	Charles Halstead / Advisor (voice)	Direct-to-video
2024	Justice League: Crisis on Infinite Earths	Psycho-Pirate, Hawkman (voice)	Direct-to-video

=== Television ===
Year	Title	Role	Notes
1998–1999	Celebrity Deathmatch	Sean Connery, Christopher Walken (voices)	2 episodes
1998–2001	Daria	Charles 'Upchuck' Ruttheimer III (voice)	Recurring role (21 episodes)
2002	Undeclared	Jimmy	Episode: "Jobs, Jobs, Jobs"
2002	Is It College Yet?	Charles 'Upchuck' Ruttheimer III (voice)	TV film
2002	Porn 'n Chicken	Andy	TV film
2003	Hey Joel	David Faustino, Intercom Voice, Moby (voices)	Episode: "Judgment Day"
2003	Guiding Light	Gavin Strong / The Mole (voice)	Episode: "dated 11 June 2003"
2003	Law & Order	Jeffrey	Episode: "Bounty"
2004	Law & Order: Criminal Intent	Daris Macelvoy	Episode: "Conscience"
2004	The Wrong Coast	Various Celebrity Voices	Unknown episodes
2005	Law & Order: Special Victims Unit	Game Designer	Episode: "Game"
2006	Love Monkey	Kyle	Episodes: "The Window"
2007	Making It Legal	Ethan	TV film
2008	Greek	Egyptian Joe	2 episodes
2009	Trust Me	Hector Culligan	Main role (13 episodes)
2009	Rex	Jeffrey Wagstaff	TV film
2009	Private Practice	Jimmy	Episode: "Slip Slidin' Away"
2010	Medium	Andy Seward	Episode: "Allison Rolen Got Married"
2010	The Closer	Wayne West	Episode: "In Custody"
2011–2013	Body of Proof	Ethan Gross	Main role (42 episodes)
2013	Neil's Puppet Dreams	DJ	Episode: "Bollywood"
2014	Grey's Anatomy	Thom	Episode: "Throwing it All Away"
2014	Garfunkel & Oates	Todd	Episode: "The Fadeaway"
2014–2019	Madam Secretary	Matt Mahoney	Main role (111 episodes)
2016	Dream Corp, LLC	Patient #086 (voice)	Episode: "The Predator"
2017	American Dad!	Tony Perotti (voice)	Episode: "Garbage Stan"
2020	The Magicians	George	2 episodes
2021	Goliath	Griffin Petock	Main cast Season 4
2021–2023	Physical	Jerry	Main cast (Season 1), guest (Seasons 2 & 3); 9 episodes
2022	The Offer	Aram Avakian	Miniseries; 3 episodes
2025	Deli Boys	Ralph	Episode: "Delicate Boys"
2026	NCIS	Tommy	Episode: "Reboot"

=== Video games ===
Year	Title	Role	Notes
2000	Daria's Inferno	Charles 'Upchuck' Ruttheimer III, Degas Street patrons	
2004	Red Dead Revolver	Mr. Black, Prof. Perry, Cowboys #6	
2004	Grand Theft Auto: San Andreas	Pedestrian	
2005	The Warriors	Hi Hat	
2006	Neverwinter Nights 2	Cain, Githyanki Lieutenant, Vashne	
2007	Manhunt 2	The Legion	Deleted scenes
2008	Grand Theft Auto IV	The Crowd of Liberty City	
