= Wendy Hoopes =

Malaysian actress and voice actress

- Born: Kuala Lumpur, Malaysia
- Occupations: Actress, voice actress
- Years active: 1996–present

Wendy Hoopes is an American actress best-known for her roles on MTV's animated series Daria, where she provided the voices for three different main characters (Jane Lane, Helen Morgendorffer, and Quinn Morgendorffer).

== Life and career ==
Hoopes was born in Kuala Lumpur, Malaysia and was the fourth of five children in her family. She spent her childhood travelling overseas, particularly to the United States, where she received her Bachelor of Fine Arts degree at New York University's Tisch School of the Arts. Her first major acting accomplishment was her creation of the character Bee Bee in Eric Bogosian's 1994 production SubUrbia at Lincoln Center.

Her best known work is voice acting multiple roles on Daria, an animated series that ran on MTV for five years. She and actor Marc Thompson were considered the two "stand out" voice talents of the series, for they each provided the voices for numerous different characters.

Since Daria ended in 2002, Hoopes has made guest appearances on several television shows, including Law & Order: Criminal Intent, Hey Joel, The Wrong Coast, The Jury, LAX, Judging Amy, Third Watch, Sex and the City, Law & Order, Swift Justice, Brotherhood, and New York Undercover. Her film credits include Private Parts, Better Living, Killing Cinderella, Calling Bobcat, Roadblock, Spinster and The Sitter.

She has also appeared in theatre productions, including a rock musical about Janis Joplin, and she provided the voice for Mona Sax in the video game Max Payne 2: The Fall of Max Payne and Max Payne 3.

== Filmography ==
=== Film ===
Year	Title	Role	Notes
1996	Never Give Up: The Jimmy V Story	Older Nicole Valvano	Television film
1997	Private Parts	Elyse	
1998	Better Living	Gail	
2000	Calling Bobcat	Monica	
2000	Is It Fall Yet?	Jane Lane, Helen Morgendorffer, Quinn Morgendorffer (voices)	Television film
2000	Roadblock		Short film
2000	Killing Cinderella	Liz	
2000	101 Ways (The Things a Girl Will Do to Keep Her Volvo)	Watson	
2002	Is It College Yet?	Jane Lane, Helen Morgendorffer, Quinn Morgendorffer (voices)	Television film
2002	Sinister	Nico	Short film
2006	Especial	Granny Sasha, Marshall	CG-feature animation film
2009	Peach Farm (The Veil)		Short film; also director, writer and producer
2011	The Sitter	Bethany	
2014	Captain America: The Winter Soldier	Doctor	

=== Television ===
Year	Title	Role	Notes
1996	Swift Justice	Beth Paxton	Episode: "Pilot"
1996	New York Undercover	Rebecca Skolnik	Episode: "Going Platinum"
1997–2001	Daria	Jane Lane, Helen Morgendorffer, Quinn Morgendorffer (voices)	65 episodes
1999	Sex and the City	Lennox	Episode: "They Shoot Single People, Don't They?"
2000	Third Watch	Bonnie Bryman	Episode: "Faith"
2003	Law & Order: Criminal Intent	Katie Guardino	Episode: "Gold Comfort"
2003	Hey Joel	Angela Chen, Barb Bender (voices)	2 episodes
2004	The Wrong Coast	Various Celebrity Voices	Unknown episodes
2004	The Jury	Mary Woods	Episode: "The Pilot"
2004–2005	LAX	Betty	13 episodes
2005	Judging Amy	Claudia Ramie	Episode: "Sorry I Missed You"
2005	Law & Order	Denise Clark	Episode: "Red Ball"
2006–2007	Brotherhood	Fiona Cork	4 episodes
2008	Criminal Minds	Sarah Fitzgerald	Episode: "In Heat"
2009	Grey's Anatomy	Tricia Shelly	Episode: "I Will Follow You Into the Dark"
2011	The Good Wife	Karen Jennings	Episode: "Wrongful Termination"
2011	Private Practice	Gina Rakoff	Episode: "God Bless the Child"
2012	Nurse Jackie	Andi	Episode: "The Wall"
2014	Elementary	Detective Anne Wozniak	Episode: "All in the Family"
2014	The Following	Bella	Episode: "Reflection"
2016	Law & Order: Special Victims Unit	Lisa Crivello	Episode: "Townhouse Incident"
2017	Blindspot	Claire Dunn	Episode: "Gunplay Ricochet"
2018	Law & Order: Special Victims Unit	Anna Sadler	Episode: "Send In The Clowns"
2018; 2024	Blue Bloods	Diane Bennett, Sandi Catsavis	2 episodes

=== Video games ===
Year	Title	Role	Notes
2000	Daria's Inferno	Jane Lane, Helen Morgendorffer, Quinn Morgendorffer	
2003	Max Payne 2: The Fall of Max Payne	Mona Sax, Answering-machine	
2012	Max Payne 3	Mona Sax	
