= Sarah Drew =

American actress (born 1980)

- Drew in 2026
- Born: October 1, 1980 (age 46); Stony Brook, New York, U.S.
- Education: University of Virginia
- Occupations: Actress; director
- Years active: 1997–present
- Spouse: Peter Lanfer (m. 2002)
- Children: 2

Sarah Drew (born October 1, 1980) is an American actress and director. She is known for her roles as Stacy Rowe in the MTV animated series Daria (1997–2001), Hannah Rogers in The WB family drama series Everwood (2004–2006), and Dr. April Kepner in the ABC medical drama series Grey's Anatomy (2009–18; 2021–22). She currently plays the lead role of Emily Lane in the Hallmark Christmas mystery series Mistletoe Murders (2024–present).

== Early life and education ==
Drew was born and raised in Stony Brook, New York, where she attended The Stony Brook School. Her mother, Dr. Jeannie Drew, taught biology at an independent private school for girls in Manhattan. Her father, the Rev. Charles Drew, is the senior pastor at Emmanuel Presbyterian Church in New York City. Her brother, Allen Drew, is a pastor at Mt. Airy Community Church in Philadelphia and director of an a cappella group at Germantown Friends School. She received a bachelor's degree in drama from the University of Virginia in 2002. Her second cousin is actor Ben McKenzie.

== Career ==
In 1997, while in high school, Drew voiced Stacy Rowe on the animated series Daria. She also voiced that character in the Daria television films Is It Fall Yet? and Is It College Yet?. In 2001, she made her professional stage debut as Juliet in Romeo and Juliet at the McCarter Theatre in Princeton, New Jersey. She made her Broadway debut in 2003 in Vincent in Brixton, which later took her to London's West End. She made the move to television with a guest role in the series Wonderfalls, and was in the film Radio. She appeared as Katie Burrell, the daughter of a Japanese relocation camp sergeant, in the 2007 film American Pastime.

From 2004 to 2006, Drew starred as Hannah Rogers in The WB drama series Everwood. She later guest-starred on Cold Case, Law & Order: Special Victims Unit, Medium, Castle, Glee, Privileged, Supernatural, and Private Practice. She starred in the Hallmark Hall of Fame film Front of the Class (2008), and from 2008 to 2009, she had a recurring role as Kitty Romano in the AMC drama series Mad Men. In 2014, she starred in the film Moms' Night Out.

=== Grey's Anatomy ===
In 2009, Drew was cast as Dr. April Kepner in the medical drama series Grey's Anatomy. Drew was cast in late September and first appeared in the sixth season episode "Invasion" as one of the residents from Mercy West Hospital after its merger with Seattle Grace Hospital. Drew was brought aboard Grey's Anatomy after former collaborations with series creator Shonda Rhimes; she was featured as a guest in 2 episodes of Private Practice in 2008 and was a main cast member in Rhimes' 2009 television pilot Inside the Box, which ABC passed on. In 2010, she was promoted to a series-regular for the seventh season.

In March 2018, it was announced that Drew, along with Jessica Capshaw, would be exiting the series. Showrunner Krista Vernoff stated that the decision was purely creative, not budgetary.

However, it was announced in March 2021 that Drew would be returning during season 17, and in April 2022 that Drew would be returning for the 400th episode of the 18th season, along with Jesse Williams.

=== 2018–present ===
Shortly following the announcement of her Grey's Anatomy exit, Drew was cast as Detective Cagney in CBS' Cagney & Lacey reboot pilot. CBS passed on the pilot in May 2018, deciding not to produce the series.

In July 2018, Drew took on the role of Lucille Ball, starring in the world premiere production of I Love Lucy: A Funny Thing Happened on the Way to the Sitcom, a behind-the-scenes stage comedy about I Love Lucy by Gregg Oppenheimer (son of series creator Jess Oppenheimer). Recorded before a live audience at the UCLA's James Bridges Theater, the L.A. Theatre Works production aired on public radio and has been released on Audio CD and as a downloadable MP3.

In 2019, Drew was once again cast as the title character in a CBS pilot, this time as Sarah Cooper in The Republic of Sarah, but the project was ultimately passed on by the network. A different leading cast, led by Stella Baker, was chosen when the series was rebooted by The CW network for the 2020–21 season.

On October 30, 2020, Drew has been cast in a recurring role as Cindy Turner (Jeanette's mother) in the Freeform (ABC Family) series Cruel Summer.

In September 2021, Drew was cast in Apple TV+ comedy series Amber Brown based on the bestselling books by Paula Danziger.

In 2022, Drew started as Lizbeth Meredith in the Lifetime movie Stolen By Their Father as part of its "Ripped from the Headlines" feature films; it had Elizabeth Smart as an executive producer.

== Personal life ==
Drew married Peter Lanfer, a lecturer at Dartmouth College, on June 17, 2002. They have two children. She is Christian.

== Filmography ==
=== Film ===
| Year | Title | Role | Notes |
|---|---|---|---|
| 2000 | Is It Fall Yet? | Stacy Rowe (voice) | Television Film |
| 2002 | Is It College Yet? | Stacy Rowe (voice) | Television Film |
| 2003 | Radio | Mary Helen | |
| 2005 | The Baxter | Serena | |
| 2007 | American Pastime | Katie Burrell | |
| 2008 | Wieners | Karen | |
| 2010 | Tug | Ariel | |
| 2014 | Moms' Night Out | Allyson | |
| 2018 | Indivisible | Heather Turner | Also executive producer |
| 2019 | Twinkle All The Way | Cadence | TV Movie |
| 2023 | Birthright Outlaw | Martha Rose Jacobs | Also co-producer |
| 2026 | Jimmy | Hedda Hopper | |

=== Television ===
| Year | Title | Role | Notes |
|---|---|---|---|
| 1997–2001 | Daria | Stacy Rowe (voice) | 28 episodes |
| 2004 | Wonderfalls | Bianca Knowles | Episode: "Karma Chameleon" |
| 2004–2006 | Everwood | Hannah Rogers | Main Role (38 episodes) |
| 2006 | Cold Case | Jennifer "Jenny" Hawkins in 1958 | Episode: "Static" |
| 2007 | Law & Order: Special Victims Unit | Becca Rice | Episode: "Responsible" |
| 2007 | Reinventing the Wheelers | Becky Conner | Movie |
| 2008 | Medium | Suzie Keener | Episode: "Wicked Game" (Parts 1 & 2) |
| 2008 | Privileged | Caryn | Episode: "All About Insecurities" |
| 2008 | Front of the Class | Nancy Lazarus | Movie |
| 2008-2009 | Private Practice | Judy | 2 episodes |
| 2008-2009 | Mad Men | Kitty Romano | 4 episodes |
| 2009 | Inside the Box | Molly | Pilot |
| 2009 | Castle | Chloe Richardson | Episode: "Nanny McDead" |
| 2009 | Numb3rs | Piper St. John | Episode: "Angels and Devils" |
| 2009 | In Plain Sight | Rachel Rosenzweig | Episode: "Aguna Matatala" |
| 2009 | Glee | Suzy Pepper | Episode: "Ballad" |
| 2009–2018, 2021–2022 | Grey's Anatomy | Dr. April Kepner | Recurring (Season 6); Main Role (Seasons 7–14); Special Guest Star (Seasons 17–18): 194 episodes |
| 2010 | Supernatural | Nora / Demon | Episode: "Swap Meat" |
| 2010 | Miami Medical | Emily | Episode: "What Lies Beneath" |
| 2018 | Christmas Pen Pals | Hannah Morris | Television film (Lifetime) |
| 2020 | Christmas in Vienna | Jess Waters | Television film (Hallmark channel) |
| 2021 | Cruel Summer | Cindy Turner | Recurring role (season 1) |
| 2021 | One Summer | Jenna Fontaine | Television film (Hallmark channel) |
| 2022 | Stolen by Their Father | Lizbeth Meredith | Television film (Lifetime) |
| 2022 | Amber Brown | Sarah Brown | Main role |
| 2022 | Reindeer Games Homecoming | MacKenzie Graves | Television film (Lifetime); also writer and executive producer |
| 2023 | Guiding Emily | Emily | Television film (Hallmark channel) |
| 2023 | How She Caught a Killer | Detective Linda Murphy | Television film (Lifetime); also executive producer |
| 2024 | Branching Out | Amelia | Television film (Hallmark channel) |
| 2024-present | Mistletoe Murders | Emily Lane | Television series (Hallmark); also executive producer |
| 2026 | The Stars Between Us | Kim | Television film (Hallmark channel) |

=== Writer ===
| Year | Title | Notes |
|---|---|---|
| 2023 | A Cowboy Christmas Romance | Also executive producer |
| 2024 | A Carpenter Christmas Romance | Also executive producer |

=== Video games ===
| Year | Title | Role |
|---|---|---|
| 2000 | Daria's Inferno | Stacy Rowe (voice) |

=== Web ===
| Year | Title | Role |
|---|---|---|
| 2010 | Seattle Grace: Message of Hope | Dr. April Kepner |
