= Is It College Yet? =

2002 animated comedy-drama television film

- DVD cover
- Created by: Glenn Eichler; Susie Lewis Lynn
- Written by: Glenn Eichler; Peggy Nicoll
- Directed by: Karen Disher
- Voices of: Tracy Grandstaff; Wendy Hoopes; Julián Rebolledo; Marc Thompson; Alvaro J. Gonzalez
- Theme music composer: Splendora
- Composer: Janet Wygal
- Country of origin: United States
- Original language: English

Production
- Executive producers: Glenn Eichler; Abby Terkuhle
- Producers: Cindy E. Brolsma; Lemon Krasny; Andrea Wortham
- Editors: Karen Kunkel; Karen Sztajnberg
- Running time: 75 minutes (original); 66 minutes (DVD edit)
- Production company: MTV Animation

Original release
- Network: MTV
- Release: January 21, 2002

Related
- Is It Fall Yet?

Is It College Yet? is a 2002 American animated comedy-drama television film written by Glenn Eichler and Peggy Nicoll, and directed by Karen Disher. The film was the second film-length installment of MTV's animated series Daria, after 2000's Is it Fall Yet?, and served as the series finale, chronicling the end of high school as the characters prepare for college.

Is It College Yet? was produced in lieu of an abbreviated, six-episode sixth season requested by MTV. Series co-creator Glenn Eichler planned to wrap the show with the fifth-season finale "Boxing Daria", believing that there was no more story to tell.

The film was first broadcast by MTV on January 21, 2002, released on both VHS and DVD formats on August 27, 2002, and was included on the DVD release of Daria: The Complete Animated Series on May 11, 2010. The film has yet to see a Blu-ray release.

== Plot ==
Daria and Jane discuss their plans for attending college. Daria's first choice is Bromwell University, a fictionalized version of Harvard or Yale, and her second choice is the selective but less elite Raft College. Jane's first choice is Boston Fine Arts College (BFAC), but she also intends to apply to two state schools as a backup.

Daria's boyfriend Tom Sloane, who is a legacy at Bromwell, is excited about the prospect of attending college with Daria. Tom's mother agrees to drive them to tour Bromwell in fictional Newtown, followed by Raft in Boston. At Bromwell, Tom charms the admission officer with stories about his family's experiences there, while a nervous Daria fumbles her interview. The next day, Tom and his mother make plans that cause the group to get a late start, and, to Daria’s dismay, they arrive at Raft after the admissions office has closed. Daria is accepted by Raft, but wait listed by Bromwell. Tom gets into Bromwell and offers to have his parents write Daria a letter of recommendation, but she declines.

Jane is overwhelmed with creating a portfolio for her BFAC application. After being rejected by several less demanding colleges, she considers skipping college entirely. Her older brother Trent encourages this idea, but Daria talks her into sending a portfolio to BFAC in exchange for Daria's accepting Tom's parents' offer to write her a letter. Trent initially calls her a sellout, but finally admits he was just upset that she might be leaving. Jane points out he can visit Boston to play gigs and sleep on her floor. Despite the letter of recommendation, Daria does not get into Bromwell. To Tom's surprise, Daria breaks up with him, explaining that their lives are diverging and the relationship has run its course.

Jodie, exhausted from being the model minority student at Lawndale, wants to attend historically black Turner College, while her parents expect her to attend the exclusive Crestmore University. Jodie is accepted by both, but does not believe she can attend Turner if her parents do not accept her decision. Mack contacts Jodie's father to explain her distress, leading to her parents changing their minds. Mack is accepted to Vance College on scholarship. While they will be geographically separated, Jodie is convinced this experience has brought them closer.

Brittany is accepted to local Prairie State University, but boyfriend Kevin will need to repeat his senior year due to abysmal grades. Embarrassed, Kevin tries to hide this from Brittany before coming clean, and asks if she will stay with him through college. Brittany promises she will, while secretly crossing her fingers.

Daria's younger sister, Quinn, gets her first job as a restaurant hostess and befriends a co-worker named Lindy, who is in college. Quinn notices Lindy has a drinking problem, which culminates with Lindy arriving at work drunk and getting fired. Unsure whether to encourage Lindy to seek help, Quinn seeks Daria's advice. Inspired by Daria's honesty in breaking up with Tom even though it caused her to feel lonely, Quinn determines that she will be honest, too. Quinn also tells Daria that she will have friends in college because the social dynamics are different from high school. When Quinn confronts Lindy, Lindy gets angry and tells Quinn to leave. A few days later, Lindy apologizes but still insists that she is not an alcoholic.

Quinn's work causes her to miss several Fashion Club meetings, and the clique drifts apart. Tensions escalate when Stacy secretly wishes that club president Sandi would "just shut up," after which Sandi suffers a vocal cord injury that causes her to lose her voice. At an end-of-year party, after Sandi tries to punish Stacy for her bad thoughts, Stacy stands up for herself and intones that she doesn't want to be a member of the fashion club if it means taking Sandi's abuse. When Quinn and Tiffany join in, Sandi goes along with disbanding the club to save face. After remarking that "it's like the end of an era," the group agrees to hang out the next day as if nothing has changed.

Tom visits Daria to get some closure after the breakup. He tells Daria that he looks up to her and values her opinion, and Daria tells him that he's a good (but imperfect) guy and that she was glad they dated. They agree to keep in touch and remain friends.

At a graduation party, Jane reveals to Daria that she was accepted to BFAC and thanks her for the push to apply. Daria is surprised and proud. Jane expresses excitement that they will both be living in Boston and tells Daria to prepare to be "dragged to more parties." Daria thanks Jane for helping her get through high school.

At graduation, Daria wins an academic award and improvises a speech in which she reiterates her contempt for high school, but ends with a summation of her life philosophy and expresses gratitude for Jane and her family, drawing applause from the crowd. Afterwards, Daria and Jane meet for pizza as usual, and muse on what they will find together once they arrive in Boston for college and begin a new era in their lives.

== Soundtrack ==
The first music video for "Breaking Up the Girl" by Garbage premiered as part of the film, featuring a Daria montage, and the song was promoted as the "theme song" for College; the song used during the title sequence of the film was Splendora's last-ever song "College Try (Gives Me Blisters)".

== Alternate version ==
An edited version of this TV-movie was cablecast by MTV in reruns, which cut several minutes from the original broadcast version. A VHS was distributed in 2002 by MTV Home Video/ Paramount. Both DVD releases (the original single-disc release and the Complete Animated Series release) include the edited version. The original was presumed to be lost until 2020, when a home-made restored version was released on the web. This version was created using the original DVD release with the inclusion of the previously cut parts recovered from an old MTV recording.

== Cast ==
- Tracy Grandstaff as Daria Morgendorffer
- Wendy Hoopes as Jane Lane, Helen Morgendorffer and Quinn Morgendorffer
- Julián Rebolledo as Jake Morgendorffer
- Alvaro J. Gonzales as Trent Lane
- Russell Hankin as Tom Sloane
- Marc Thompson as Anthony DiMartino, Timothy O'Neill, Kevin Thompson and Jamie White
- Tim Novikoff as Jeffy
- Steven Huppert as Joey
- Jessica Cyndee Jackson as Jodie Landon
- Amir Williams as Michael Jordan "Mack-Daddy" Mackenzie
- Janie Mertz as Sandi Griffin, Brittany Taylor and Andrea
- Sarah Drew as Stacy Rowe
- Ashley Albert as Tiffany Blum-Decker and Janet Barch
- Geoffrey Arend as Charles "Upchuck" Ruttheimer III
- Nora Laudani as Angela Li
- Bart Fasbender as Andrew Landon
- Laurine Towler as Michele Landon
- Rand Bridges as Bill Woods
- Jessica Hardin as Lindy
- Daniel Milledge as Angier Sloane
- Amanda Fox as Katherine Sloane
- John W. Lynn Jr. as Sick, Sad World Announcer

== Reception ==
In a review of the movie and the show in general, Slate reporter Emily Nussbaum said Is It College Yet? was "a bit of a classic" for showing its "sharply funny exploration of social class... the high-schoolers head off to very different paths in life, based on their economic prospects — unlike, say, the characters on 90210."
