= Splendora =

American rock band

- Origin: New York City, New York, United States
- Genres: Alternative rock; grunge
- Years active: 1993–2002
- Labels: Really Fast Racecar; Koch
- Past members: Janet Wygal; Tricia Wygal; Delissa Santos; Cindy Brolsma; Jennifer Richardson

Splendora was an American all-female alternative rock band from New York City. Formed in 1993 by Janet Wygal (lead vocals, guitar), Tricia Wygal (lead vocals, bass), Delissa Santos (drums), Cindy Brolsma (cello), and Jennifer Richardson (violin), the band released one studio album, In the Grass (1995), before disbanding in 2002.

The band is best known for performing "You're Standing on My Neck", which was featured as the opening theme to the MTV animated series Daria. Splendora also performed "Turn the Sun Down" and "College Try" for the Daria television films Is It Fall Yet? and Is It College Yet?, respectively.

== History ==
=== Formation and In the Grass: 1993–1996 ===
After the break up of her power pop band The Wygals, Janet Wygal began recreationally composing music with her sister Tricia Wygal. By 1993, these music sessions expanded to include friends of the two sisters, including Delissa Santos, Cindy Brolsma, and Jennifer Richardson. In an interview with Billboard, Tricia Wygal described the formation of the band to be a "labor of love", recalling that "[Splendora] rehearsed all the time. It was just fun." The band originally struck a development deal with Geffen Records, although the record label ultimately chose to work with Lisa Loeb instead. Following this dismissal, Splendora signed with Koch Records.

Splendora's debut studio album In the Grass was released on September 9, 1995, by Koch Records. Produced collaboratively between Splendora and Gene Holder of The dB's, the title of the record is a spin on the 1961 teen melodrama Splendor in the Grass. "Rattle" was released as the only single from the effort, by Really Fast Racecar Records. The band also recorded a music video for "Bee Stung Lips", which was directed by Carey Burtt. In the Grass received little promotion and failed to achieve any considerable commercial success, with the album now being out of print. However, the album did receive some positive critical reception from music publications such as Billboard. Janet Wygal attributes the album's lukewarm commercial reception to a lack of support from Koch Records, explaining: "[Splendora] didn’t have a booking agent, the tour that we did, I booked, I think… I remember going in there and calling radio stations myself, and asking if they’d received our CD."

=== Daria theme songs and breakup: 1997–2002 ===
In 1997, cellist Cindy Brolsma began work as a producer on the then-upcoming MTV adult animated sitcom Daria. For the show's theme song, MTV was in search of an "unknown" band. Interested in this opportunity, Brolsma shared a copy of Splendora's debut album In the Grass with fellow Daria producer Susie Lewis, who ultimately asked the band to write and record a theme song for the show. Splendora recorded a four-track demo for the producers, building these songs around certain phrases that the producers asked them to include in their lyrics, such as "excuse me" and "you're standing on my neck". A song titled "You're Standing on My Neck" was chosen as the show's theme, with elements of the song also acting as incidental music in the show. The full song was also featured in the 2000 puzzle adventure video game Daria's Inferno. Splendora produced two further original themes for the Daria television movies Is It Fall Yet? and Is It College Yet?, being "Turn the Sun Down" and "College Try" respectively.

Following the release of "College Try" in 2002, the band announced their decision to break up. With the exit of Delissa Santos and as other members began getting married and having children, there was a general lack of enthusiasm among band members. Tricia Wygal explained that these events had left the group feeling dissatisfied, stating, "It wasn’t quite the same band. It felt a little different".

=== Post-breakup ===
In 2013, lead vocalists Janet and Tricia Wygal briefly reunited for a performance of "You're Standing on My Neck" at the tavern and music venue Maxwell's. To commemorate the 20th anniversary of Daria in 2017, Andrew Unterberger of Billboard interviewed Janet and Tricia Wygal, in which they discussed Splendora's history and the group's three Daria theme songs. On July 6, 2020, "You're Standing on My Neck" was officially released onto music streaming services under the title "Daria (Official MTV Theme)".

== Musical style and influences ==
Splendora drew inspiration from a variety of sources, including CBGB, sunshine pop, and grunge. Late-'60s and '70s bands such as the Ramones, Television, Talking Heads, and The Free Design were formative influences on the band. Janet Wygal explained that the musical style of Splendora was meant to display "this aggressive-sounding bed, with pretty vocals floating over it".

== Band members ==
Former members

- Janet Wygal – lead vocals, guitar (1993–2002)
- Tricia Wygal – bass guitar, lead vocals, percussion, flute (1993–2002)
- Delissa Santos – drums (1993–2002)
- Cindy Brolsma – cello, whistling (1993–2002)
- Jennifer Richardson – violin (1993–2002)

== Discography ==
=== Studio album ===
Title	Details
In the Grass	Release date: September 9, 1995; Label: Koch; Formats: CD

=== Extended play ===
Title	Details
Daria	Release date: November 25, 2024; Label: Really Fast Racecar; Formats: Digital download, streaming

=== Single ===
Year	Song	Album
1995	"Rattle"	In the Grass

=== Promotional single ===
Year	Song	Album
2020	"Daria (Official MTV Theme)"	Non-album single

=== Music video ===
Year	Title	Director
1995	"Bee Stung Lips"	Carey Burtt

== See also ==
- The Individuals (a power pop band featuring Janet Wygal and her brother Doug)
