= Daria =

Animated television series (1997–2002)

- Genre: Animated sitcom; Comedy-drama; Teen drama; Teen sitcom; Satire; Slice-of-life
- Created by: Glenn Eichler; Susie Lewis Lynn
- Based on: Daria Morgendorffer from Beavis and Butt-Head by Mike Judge
- Voices of: Tracy Grandstaff; Wendy Hoopes; Julián Rebolledo; Marc Thompson; Alvaro J. Gonzalez; Russell Hankin
- Theme music composer: Splendora
- Opening theme: "You're Standing on My Neck" by Splendora
- Country of origin: United States
- No. of seasons: 5
- No. of episodes: 65 (list of episodes)

Production
- Executive producers: Abby Terkuhle; Glenn Eichler (S5)
- Producers: Susie Lewis Lynn (S1–3); Cindy E. Brolsma (S4–5); Amy Palmer (S4)
- Editor: Neil Lawrence
- Running time: 21–22 minutes
- Production companies: Heyday Media; MTV Animation

Original release
- Network: MTV
- Release: March 3, 1997 – January 21, 2002

Daria is an American teen animated sitcom created by Glenn Eichler and Susie Lewis Lynn. The series ran from March 3, 1997, to January 21, 2002, on MTV. It centers on the titular character, Daria Morgendorffer, an intelligent, cynical high school student, voiced by Tracy Grandstaff, who had voiced the character in Mike Judge's earlier animated series, Beavis and Butt-Head.

It is a spin-off of Beavis and Butt-Head, in which Daria appeared as a recurring character. Although Judge allowed the character to star in a spin-off, he had no involvement in the production of Daria himself, as he was busy working on King of the Hill.

== Premise ==
The series centers on Daria Morgendorffer, a smart, acerbic, and cynical teenage girl who, along with her best friend, aspiring artist Jane Lane, observes the world around her. The show is set in the fictional suburban American town of Lawndale, and is a satire of high school life, full of allusions to and criticisms of popular culture and social classes. As the show's eponymous protagonist, Daria appears in most scenes with her immediate family (mother Helen, father Jake, and younger sister Quinn) and/or Jane.

The show is set during Daria's high school days and ends with her graduation and acceptance into college. The principal location used for the show (outside of the Morgendorffer home) is Lawndale High School, a public-education institution filled with flamboyant and dysfunctional characters.

The dynamics among the two lead characters changed during season four, when Jane began a relationship with Tom Sloane. Though Daria is hesitant to accept Tom at first, fearing she will lose her best friend, she and Tom find themselves becoming closer, culminating in a kiss in the season finale. The emotional and comedic turmoil among Jane, Tom, and Daria was the centerpiece of the TV movie Is It Fall Yet?, and the relationship between Tom and Daria fueled several of season five's plotlines.

The plots of Daria largely concern a juxtaposition between the focal character's blunted, sardonic cynicism and the values/preoccupations of her suburban hometown of Lawndale. In a 2005 interview, series co-creator Glenn Eichler described the otherwise unspecified locale as "a mid-Atlantic suburb, outside somewhere like Baltimore or Washington, D.C. They could have lived in Pennsylvania near the Main Line, though". For comedic and illustrative purposes, the show's depiction of suburban American life was a deliberately exaggerated one. In The New York Times, the protagonist was described as "a blend of Dorothy Parker, Fran Lebowitz, and Janeane Garofalo, wearing Carrie Donovan's glasses. Daria Morgendorffer, 16 and cursed with a functioning brain, has the misfortune to see high school, her family, and her life for exactly what they are and the temerity to comment on it."

== Characters ==
Left to Right: Upchuck, Mack, Jodie, Trent, Jake, Helen, Quinn, Daria, Jane, Brittany, Kevin.

=== Main ===
Daria Morgendorffer
An unfashionably dressed, bespectacled, highly intellectual, entirely pessimistic about life altogether, cynical, and sarcastic teenage girl who is portrayed as an icon of sanity in an insane household in an equally insane upper-middle-class suburb.
Voiced by Tracy Grandstaff.
Jane Lane
Daria's artistic best friend and fellow outcast, as well as the youngest of the five Lane siblings. Like Daria, Jane is very sarcastic and cynical, but she is more athletic and socially comfortable than her friend is.
Voiced by Wendy Hoopes.
Quinn Morgendorffer
Daria's shallow, initially dimwitted, materialistic, and vain younger sister who is one of the most popular girls in school. She is a member of Lawndale High School's Fashion Club.
Voiced by Wendy Hoopes.
Helen Morgendorffer
Daria and Quinn's mother, a workaholic corporate attorney and the family's principal wage earner.
Voiced by Wendy Hoopes.
Jake Morgendorffer
Daria and Quinn's father, a neurotic, short-tempered, bumbling, but well-meaning and loving family man.
Voiced by Julián Rebolledo.

=== Supporting ===
Trent Lane
Jane's older brother by five years, the second-youngest Lane sibling, and the only other sibling still permanently residing in the Lane household. He plays lead guitar in his band, Mystik Spyral. Daria's unspoken crush on Trent throughout the first three seasons is one of her few weaknesses.
Voiced by Alvaro J. Gonzalez.
Tom Sloane
A young man who serves as love interest to Jane and later to Daria. His parents are wealthy and he attends a nearby private school. He is, in Daria's words, "a little spoiled, a hair smug, and a trifle egotistical" but also a "smart, funny guy who's very caring and sensitive."
Voiced by Russell Hankin.
Brittany Taylor
Lawndale High's ditzy and bubbly head cheerleader; girlfriend to Kevin.
Voiced by Lisa Kathleen Collins, under the pseudonym Janie Mertz.
Kevin Thompson
The Lawndale High football team's quarterback and equally ditzy boyfriend to Brittany.
Voiced by Marc Thompson.
Michael "Mack" Jordan MacKenzie
Jodie's boyfriend and the Lawndale High football team's captain, as well as the only intelligent person on the team.
Voiced by Delon Ferdinand, Paul Williams, Kevin Daniels, and Amir Williams.
Jodie Landon
Lawndale High's class president and one of its few African-American students alongside her boyfriend Mack; she is one of Daria's few true friends other than Jane.
Voiced by Jessica Cydnee Jackson.
Charles "Upchuck" Ruttheimer, III
An obnoxious, sleazy flirt with curly red hair and freckles.
Voiced by Marc Thompson and Geoffrey Arend.
Andrea
The Lawndale High token goth who has a darkly nihilistic personality, moreso than Daria's. "Mart of Darkness" establishes that Andrea works at the local big box warehouse store and knows that Daria and Jane are infamous for making fun of the other students, which is why she initially doesn't help them out at the store. She relents when Daria and Jane promise never to tell anyone about her job or that they saw her.
Voiced by Susie Lewis Lynn and Lisa Kathleen Collins (credited under the name "Janie Mertz").
Sandi Griffin
The club president and most popular girl in school. She often tries to embarrass or sabotage Quinn due to jealousy.
Voiced by Lisa Kathleen Collins/Janie Mertz.
Stacy Rowe
The secretary of the club. Stacy is very insecure and neurotic and is the closest to Quinn.
Voiced by Jessica Zaino and Sarah Drew.
Tiffany Blum-Deckler
The sycophant of the club. She is known for her monotonous voice and lack of intelligence.
Voiced by Ashley Albert.
Joey, Jeffy, and Jamie
Three nearly interchangeable high-school students and members of the school's football team who constantly compete for Quinn's affection.
Joey was voiced by Geoffrey Arend and Steven Huppert.
Jeffy was voiced by Tim Novikoff.
Jamie was voiced by Marc Thompson.
Ms. Janet Barch
Science teacher. Due to her recent divorce, she hates all men, often taking out her frustration on Kevin, Mack, and Mr. DeMartino. However, she fell in love with Mr. O'Neill after they shared a tent (as seen on "The Daria Hunter"), leading to the running gag of Ms. Barch trying to make out with Mr. O'Neill every chance she gets (particularly during school functions), leading to her eventually marrying him (after Mr. DeMartino teaches Mr. O'Neill to stand up for himself and break up with her) during the series finale movie, "Is It College Yet?"
Voiced by Ashley Albert.
Mrs. Diane Bennett
Economics teacher who actually has great ideas and treats her students like human beings, both of which make her an extreme outlier at Lawndale High.
Voiced by Amy Bennett.
Ms. Claire Defoe
Art teacher who can be flighty but is intelligent about art.
Voiced by Nicole Carin and Danielle Carin.
Mr. Anthony DeMartino
History teacher. He often loses his temper due to his students' poor grasp of history. One of his eyes is bigger than the other, and noticeably gets larger the angrier he is. He is a lifelong bachelor and Vietnam War veteran. According to "The Daria Hunter" and "Antisocial Climbers," DeMartino grew up with a mother who cared more about the men in her life than taking care of her own son (DeMartino's story about spending time with the neighbors on the former episode, and his story about his former best friend marrying his mother on the latter episode). "The Daria Hunter" also revealed that DeMartino was sent to military school (which Jake -- a fellow military school student -- picks up on when DeMartino snatches his flask from him to heavily drink from) and that the neighbors he spent time with when his mother couldn't be bothered to raise him were "...strange, twisted people" and that Jake (whether or not he meant it, since the two of them were drunk) may have had those same neighbors.
Voiced by Marc Thompson.
Ms. Angela Li
School principal. Incredibly corrupt, her school safety policies often border on those of a police state and she will do anything to increase the budget and reputation of the school.
Voiced by Nora Laudani.
Mr. Timothy O'Neill
English teacher. He is often overly-sentimental and naïve when interacting with students.
Voiced by Marc Thompson.
Ms. Margaret Manson
School psychologist. She only has one speaking role, in which she declares Daria has self-esteem issues.
Voiced by Jessica Zaino.
Ms. Morris
Physical-education teacher, track team coach, and also the cheerleading coach. She is openly corrupt, turning physical-education class into covert cheerleading practice, and fudging grades for athletes.
Voiced by Katie Kingston.

== Episodes ==
| Season | Episodes | Originally released | |
| Season | Episodes | First released | Last released |
|---|---|---|---|
| Pilot | | Unaired | |
| 1 | 13 | March 3, 1997 | July 21, 1997 |
| 2 | 13 | February 16, 1998 | August 3, 1998 |
| 3 | 13 | February 17, 1999 | August 18, 1999 |
| 4 | 13 | February 25, 2000 | August 2, 2000 |
| 5 | 13 | February 19, 2001 | June 25, 2001 |
| Films | 2 | August 27, 2000 | January 21, 2002 |
| Specials | 2 | February 18, 2000 | January 14, 2002 |

== Origin ==
Daria Morgendorffer, the show's titular character, first appeared on MTV as a recurring character in Mike Judge's Beavis and Butt-Head. MTV senior vice president and creative director Abby Terkuhle explained that when that show "became successful, we ... created Daria's character because we wanted a smart female who could serve as the foil". Daria's original design was created by Bill Peckmann while working for J.J. Sedelmaier Productions during Beavis and Butt-Head's first season. During production of Beavis and Butt-Head's final seasons, MTV representatives, wanting to bring in a higher female demographic to the channel, approached story editor Glenn Eichler, offering a spin-off series for Daria. In 1995, a five-minute pilot, "Sealed with a Kick", was created by Eichler and Beavis and Butt-Head staffer Susie Lewis (although written by Sam Johnson and Chris Marcil). Among 4 other animated pilots pitched to the channel, Daria performed the strongest in focus groups, especially among middle-school-aged participants—a fact that bothered MTV initially, as they felt their core audience at the time was instead 18- to 24-year-olds. But after show staff argued that college students don't really watch much television, MTV approved a series order of 13 episodes; both Eichler and Lewis were signed onto the series as executive producers.

The voice of Daria, Tracy Grandstaff, originally got her start on MTV as a writer, and later was cast as a housemate on the unaired pilot of The Real World. Following that experience, Grandstaff got to know the head of development at the network and from there, got a job as a staff writer for Beavis and Butt-Head.

"The beauty of MTV back in the day was that it had no money. Everything was done really cheap. I was one of a few writers, and the only female writer, on staff," Grandstaff explained.

"...So I was the default choice [for Daria]. Janeane Garofalo from The Ben Stiller Show [was a Daria influence] for sure, as well as my own personal inner dialogue from junior high and high school in Kalamazoo, Michigan—and Sara Gilbert from Roseanne, probably more than anyone."

The first episode of Daria aired on March 3, 1997, roughly nine months before Beavis and Butt-Head ended its original run. Titled "Esteemsters", the episode where established 16-year-old Texan Daria and her family's move from fictional Highland (the setting of Beavis and Butt-Head) to the new series' equally fictional locale of Lawndale. As well as introducing Daria's parents and younger sister, Quinn, as primary supporting characters, the first episode also introduced Jane Lane, Daria's best friend and confidante. Other than a brief mention of Highland, Daria did not contain any references to Beavis and Butt-Head.

The series ran for five seasons, with 13 episodes each in five years, as well as two TV movies and two TV specials. The first movie, Is It Fall Yet?, aired on August 27, 2000, and took place between seasons four and five. MTV planned an abbreviated six-episode sixth season, but, at Eichler's request, this project was cut down to a second movie, Is It College Yet?, which served as the series finale on January 21, 2002.

== Production ==
No other characters from Beavis and Butt-Head appeared on Daria; the only direct reference to them was in promotions. Co-creator Glenn Eichler, in an interview conducted after the series' run, stated:

B&B were very strong characters, with a very specific type of humor and very loyal fans, and of course they were instantly identifiable. I felt that referencing them in Daria, while we were trying to establish the new characters and the different type of humor, ran the risk of setting up false expectations and disappointment in the viewers – which could lead to a negative reaction to the new show and its different tone. So we steered clear of B&B in the early going, and once the new show was established, there was really no need to harken back to the old one.

In the TV movie Is It Fall Yet?, several celebrities provided guest voices. MTV host Carson Daly played Quinn's summer tutor, Canadian pop punk songstress Bif Naked played Jane's art camp companion, and rock musician Dave Grohl played Jane's pretentious art camp host. Several songs by the band Foo Fighters (in which Grohl is frontman) were featured in the series.

During Daria's production, Grandstaff, Eichler, and Lewis had intentions of making a show where women appeared to be smarter and have it directed toward its female viewers, along with giving a voice to individuals who did not feel like they fit in. In contrast to audience belief, Daria had less planning and the show was left to develop more naturally, especially regarding the types of relationships the main character, Daria Morgendorffer, would have. In addition to this, the creators wanted to capture and represent what high school was like during the time the show was made, while portraying the different cliques typically seen in TV shows with a high school setting.

The first realization of how much the crew became attached to making Daria was after a five-minute pilot was created, showing how realistic the main character seemed despite being a digital creation. The animation style aided with production by having an uncomplicated form of filming that made the angles and movements appear natural. Lewis recalled letting the storyboards in the early stages of mapping Daria out aid on how the show would look with animation. Each episode was set to have a processing and completion time be nine months in order to fit making scripts, recording voice actors, and creating storyboards.

When describing why the show took longer than expected to be released on DVD after Daria's debut, Eichler recalls:

That’s how long it took to clear all the music rights. It also had a lot to do with MTV. Every time they began working on the rights, they had another loopy hit, so their small home-entertainment division had to put their resources on getting that show out. I guess we sort of got under the wire right before Jersey Shore!

Daria saw a resurgence in viewership in 2020 once the show became available on Paramount+. However, neither Is It Fall Yet? nor Is It College Yet? became available on Paramount+ or MTV's website, despite both films being crucial to the show's plot progression.

== Music and licensing ==
Daria's theme song is "You're Standing on My Neck", written and performed by female rock group Splendora. The band later created original themes for the two Daria TV movies, "Turn the Sun Down" (for Is It Fall Yet?) and "College Try (Gives Me Blisters)" (for Is It College Yet?), along with some background music.

The show itself had no original score. Though elements from Splendora's theme were used on occasion, Daria's incidental music was taken from pop music songs. Most of these were contemporary, inserted over exterior shots and some scenes, with rarely any story relevance or awareness from the characters. For example, one episode depicts characters dancing to Will Smith's "Gettin' Jiggy wit It" mere weeks after the song's release, whereas the sequence itself was designed and animated months earlier.

Some story points were built around specific songs, such as in "Legends of the Mall", where Cyndi Lauper's "Girls Just Want to Have Fun" became a major plot point for a fantasy sequence. The closing credits also featured a licensed song on all but a few occasions, the lyrics or concept of which often reflected some aspect of the preceding episode.

For the 1998 and 1999 VHS releases of some Daria episodes, incidental music was replaced, and "You're Standing on My Neck" was only played over the closing credits. However, for the bonus episodes included on the DVD releases of the two TV movies, the music was removed almost entirely.

In the DVD release Daria: The Complete Series, creator Glenn Eichler mentions in the notes that "99 percent of the music has been changed, because the cost of licensing the many music bites we used would have made it impossible to release the collection (and for many years did)." He compared it to an episode of The Twilight Zone where the astronaut comes home, and his wife can't figure out what's different about him, "... until it dawns on her that instead of a cool song from 1997 playing ... it's some tune she's never heard. Yeah, it's just like that."

The song "Heart's on Fire" by 38 Special also enjoyed a brief comeback on some late 1990s radio stations because of the popularity of the series as well as the Amy Grant b-side hit "I Love You" (from her popular crossover album Unguarded), "Silent Running" by Mike and the Mechanics, and "Stand and Deliver" by Mr. Mister.

== Reception ==
=== Critical response ===
Daria premiered to positive reviews, with John J. O'Connor of The New York Times writing in March 1997, "As far as MTV and Beavis and Butt-Head are concerned, Daria is an indispensable blast of fresh air." Daria continued to receive positive reviews during the course of its run and was one of MTV's highest rated shows, with the network's manager Van Toffler viewing the character as "a good spokesperson for MTV, intelligent but subversive".

During the program's run on MTV, Daria was part of the Cool Crap Auction, giving an overview of the goods for auction and talking "live" to the winner of one prize. Daria and Jane also hosted MTV's Top Ten Animated Videos Countdown, poking fun at MTV's cheap animation. At the end of the series run, she had an "interview" on the CBS Early Show with Jane Clayson. Daria received a ratings share between 1 and 2 percent, about 1 to 2 million viewers.

G.J. Donnelly of TV Guide, writing about the series' finale, lamented, "I already miss that monotone. I already miss those boots. ... Even at its most far-fetched, this animated film approaches the teenage experience much more realistically than shows like Dawson's Creek." On the same occasion, Emily Nussbaum wrote at Slate that "the show is biting the dust without ever getting the credit it deserved: for social satire, witty writing, and most of all, for a truly original main character". She particularly singled out for praise that all the characters were heading "to very different paths in life, based on their economic prospects," giving the show an ambiguous end; "[the finale is] a bit of a classic: a sharply funny exploration of social class most teen films would render, well, cartoonish."

=== Fandom ===
Daria was marked throughout its run by shipper debate, primarily over whether the title character should have a relationship with Trent Lane. A common argument was that it would signal a turning away from the more subversive aspects of Daria's character, such as bitter criticism of romantic relationships.

In a later episode, Tom Sloane, who became Jane's boyfriend, is introduced, drawing a wedge between Jane and Daria, for instance. Daria and Tom warmed up to each other throughout the fourth season, leading up to its finale. With Jane and Tom's relationship in crisis, a heated argument between Daria and Tom led up to a kiss in Tom's car. In the TV movie Is it Fall Yet?, Daria decided to begin a relationship with Tom, and Daria and Jane patched up their friendship. This caused an uproar, and conversation turned to whether Tom was more appropriate than Trent had been. The debate was satirized by the show's writers in a piece on MTV's website.

In interviews done after the series' run, series co-creator Glenn Eichler revealed that "any viewer who really thought that Daria and Trent could [have] a relationship was just not watching the show we were making," Tom came about because "going into our fourth year... I thought it was really pushing credibility for Daria to have only had one or two dates during her whole high school career," and "teaser" episodes like "Pierce Me" were "intended to provide some fun for that portion of the audience that was so invested in the romance angle. The fact that those moments were few and far between should have given some indication that the series was not about Daria's love life."

== Legacy ==
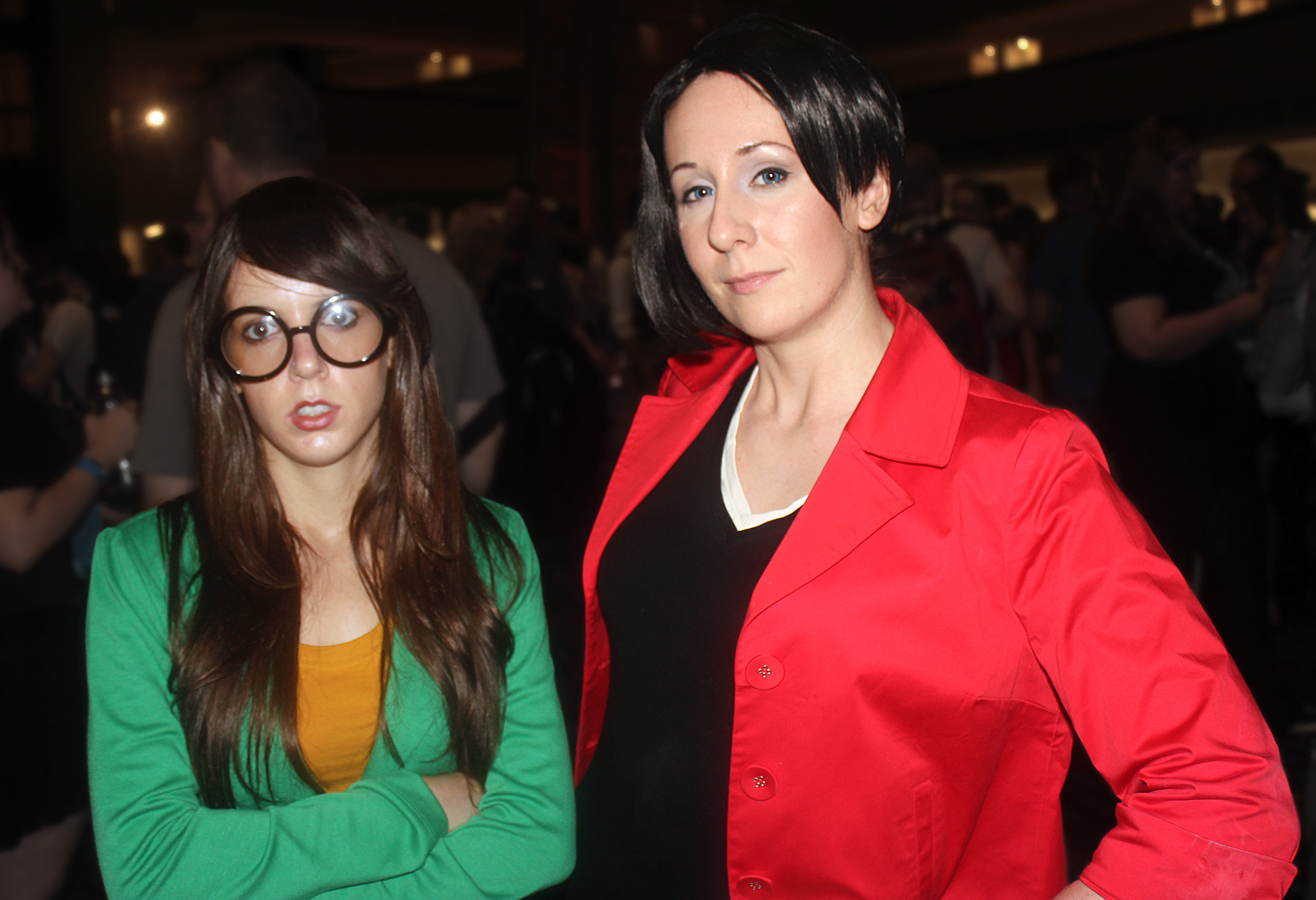
Two women cosplaying as Daria Morgendorffer and Jane Lane in September 2013

In 2002, TV Guide ranked Daria number 41 on its "50 Greatest Cartoon Characters of All Time" list. In December 2013, the newspaper The Daily Telegraph included Daria in its list of "best female cartoon characters". In November 2018, IndieWire named Daria as the fourth-best animated series of all time. In December 2023, Variety ranked Daria #91 on its list of the 100 greatest TV shows of all time.

In April 2017, in commemoration of the 20th anniversary of the series, co-creator Susie Lewis and character designer Karen Disher were contacted by the Entertainment Weekly magazine to reimagine the lives of the main characters 20 years after the events of the series. During that interview, Lewis admitted that she would "love to bring Daria back to TV".

The 2021 studio album Dariacore by Jane Remover was named after the series as they were a fan of it. Screenshots of the series were used as album covers. The album and its sequels have given rise to a music microgenre known as Dariacore.

== Jodie television movie ==
On June 21, 2018, it was announced that a revived series titled Daria & Jodie was one of many revival projects in development at MTV Studios (later called MTV Entertainment Studios), a production studio which intends to sell new series to over-the-top media services. The title was later changed to Jodie. In May 2022, it was announced that Jodie would instead be an animated film that will air on Comedy Central and be animated by Awesome Inc. By March 2024, MTV Entertainment Studios dropped the completed film and indicated the producers may try to find a new studio to sell it to for distribution.

== Broadcast and home media ==
Daria ran from March 3, 1997, to January 21, 2002, on MTV. On August 1, 2016 (coinciding MTV's 35th anniversary of its original launch date), MTV's new, rebranded, nostalgia-themed, music video-aimed sister channel (formerly known as "VH1 Classic") aired reruns.

On May 28, 2002, Noggin issued a press release stating that Daria (and the TV film Is It Fall Yet?) would begin airing as part of Noggin's primetime block for teenagers, The N, in July 2002. The series' Noggin run began on July 2, 2002, and ended on June 17, 2006.

On October 21, 1997, Sony Music released Daria on VHS, and on August 31, 1999, it also released Daria: Disfranchised also on VHS.

In July 2004, co-creator Glenn Eichler said of possible DVD releases, "There's no distributor and no release date, but what there is is very strong interest from MTV in putting Daria out, and steady activity toward making that a reality".

By July 2009, a DVD release for the series was planned for 2010. In January 2010, MTV released a teaser trailer on its website for Daria's 2010 release. That May 11, Daria: The Complete Animated Series was released on DVD in North America by Paramount Home Entertainment. All 65 episodes and both TV movies are included in the set (Is It Fall Yet? is the full uncut version, while Is It College Yet? is a shorter TV edit; these were the versions that were released on their respective standalone DVDs in earlier years). Extras include the pilot episode, the music video "Freakin' Friends" by Mystik Spiral, "Daria Day" introductions as well as an animated top 10 music video countdown on MTV by Jane and Daria, cast and crew interviews, and a script for an unproduced Mystik Spiral spin-off show. The set, with all special features intact, was released on Region 4 PAL DVD on June 1, 2011. The Region 4 set was found to be encoded region free.

In June 2018, Hulu acquired rights to stream Daria. Because of Disney's acquisition, the show was removed from Hulu at the end of September 2020 before it became available for streaming on Paramount+ in November 2020.

== Merchandise ==
=== Books ===
- Nicoll, Peggy. The Daria Database, MTV, 1998. ISBN 0-671-02596-1
- Bernstein, Anne D.. The Daria Diaries, MTV, 1998. ISBN 0-671-01709-8

=== Video games and software ===
- Daria's Sick, Sad Life Planner (1999)
- Daria's Inferno (2000)

=== GPS ===
In late 2010, Daria was licensed as a voice for Garmin and TomTom GPS systems; original putdowns and jokes were recorded.

== Related media ==
- MTV Video Music Awards 1997 short animation featuring Daria (September 4, 1997)
- Daria called into MTV's Cool Crap Auction
- Daria Day 1998 marathon of Daria episodes on the date of the premiere of the second season (February 16, 1998), hosted by Daria and Jane.
- Daria Day 1999 marathon of Daria episodes on February 15, 1999, for the premiere episode of the third season, hosted by Daria and Jane.
- Daria and Jane hosted a Daria episode marathon titled Sarcastathon 3000 for the premiere episode of the fifth season.
- Daria and Jane hosted an episode of 'MTV's Top 10'. Commenting on the top 10 animated music videos
- Behind the Scenes at Daria hosted by Janeane Garofalo.
- MTV's Toonumentary detailed the history and details of MTV's animated shows.
- MTV New Year's Eve 2002 event featured a short appearance by Daria (December 31, 2001).
- Look Back in Annoyance was a half-hour retrospective of the series, hosted by Daria and Jane, that aired in January 2002, prior to the airing of the second telefilm.
- Daria was interviewed on CBS' The Early Show on January 21, 2002.
- In 2013, CollegeHumor created a parody trailer for a live-action Daria film starring Aubrey Plaza.
- Daria makes a cameo in the Beavis and Butt-Head film sequel Beavis and Butt-Head Do the Universe (2022).
- Daria appears in the 2022 reboot of Beavis and Butt-Head as Smart Daria in the Smart Beavis and Butt-Head episodes, where the duo appear as space aliens. She is voiced by Tracy Grandstaff.
