= Julián Rebolledo =

American actor

- Other name: Julian Dean
- Education: Manhattan School of Music
- Occupation: Actor
- Years active: 1997–present

Julián Rebolledo is an American actor, best known for his role as the voice of the neurotic father Jake Morgendorffer on the MTV animated series Daria, Paul from the Pokémon anime, and as Raul Passos in the 2012 video game, Max Payne 3.

== Career ==
In 2000, Rebolledo appeared on the Law & Order episode "Vaya Con Dios", as Lt. Orra. In 2001, Rebolledo co-founded Shut Up and Talk with Sean Reyes, an audio post-production facility specializing in voice talent. Since its founding, Rebolledo has provided voice-overs for hundreds of commercials. In 2004, he toured the United States in the musical Heaven Help Us!, performing as one of the leads, a Spanish valet who channels Dean Martin.

Rebolledo was a featured voice in the Nick Jr. series Go, Diego, Go!.

== Filmography ==
=== Film ===
Year	Title	Role	Notes
2000	Is It Fall Yet?	Jake Morgendorffer (voice)	Television film
2002	Is It College Yet?	Jake Morgendorffer (voice)	Television film
2007	Chicago 10	Reporter 2 (voice)	Documentary; Credited as Julian Dean
2007	Reservation Road	News Announcer (voice)	
2009	Everybody's Fine	Cab Rider #2	Credited as Julian Rebolledo

=== Television ===
Year	Title	Role	Notes
1997–2001	Daria	Jake Morgendorffer (voice)	60 episodes
2000	Law & Order	Lt. Orra	Episode: "Vaya Con Dios"
2005–2010	Go, Diego! Go!	Animals, Animal SFX, Papi Pygmy Marmoset, Pali, Helicoptero, Beluga Whale, Tranimal, Drum Flowers, Uncle Rheas, Ocean Volcanoes, Tapirs, Announcer, Tumbleweeds, Papi Maiasaura, Dinosaur, Hawks, Senor Cortez, Giant Condor, Papi Flamingo, Flamingos, Cranky Volcano (voices)	13 episodes
2005–2019	Dora the Explorer	Toll Troll, Referee Troll, Sportscaster Troll, Lock, Junk Truck, Bridge, Announcer, Bear, Clam, Merman, Sea Creatures, Whale, King Juan El Bobo, Papi (voices)	11 episodes
2007–2022	Pokémon the Series: Diamond and Pearl, Pokémon: Ultimate Journeys	Paul, Researcher, Lab Assistant 2 (voices)	35 episodes
2010–2016	Regular Show	Don (voice)	3 episodes
2011	One Life to Live	Reverend Jeffries	3 episodes
2011	Dora's Explorer Girls: Our First Concert	Senor, Street Fair Baker, and Crowd	TV Movie
2014	Dora and Friends: Into the City	Baker, Llama, Card, Papi, Referee, Mayor (voices)	3 episodes
2015	47 Secrets to a Younger You	Bliss Guided Guru (voice)	Episode: "Secret No. 19: Strengthen Your Core"
2019	Welcome to the Wayne	Moose Guy (voice)	2 episodes
2024	The Loud House	Gus Gamesngrub	Singing; Episode: "Love Me Tenor"

=== Video games ===
Year	Title	Role
2000	Daria's Inferno	Jake Morgendorffer
2000	Who Wants to Beat Up a Millionaire?	Voices
2000	Panty Raider: From Here to Immaturity	
2001	Deer Avenger 4: The Rednecks Strike Back	
2010	Red Dead Redemption	Mexican Rebel Leader
2010	Red Dead Redemption: Undead Nightmare	Mexican Rebel Leader
2012	Max Payne 3	Raul Passos
2021	Grand Theft Auto Online: The Cayo Perico Heist	Cayo Perico Guard 6
2022	Gotham Knights	Additional Voices
2023	Cook Serve Forever	Romero

=== Web ===
Year	Title	Role	Notes
2023	Helluva Boss	Mariachi Imp/Additional Voices	Episode: "Western Energy"
