= Tracy Grandstaff =

American voice actress, writer and production assistant

- Born: Tracy Jeanne Grandstaff; United States
- Occupations: Voice actress, writer, consultant, producer, singer
- Years active: 1992–present

Tracy Jeanne Grandstaff is an American voice actress, writer and producer best known for her work portraying Daria Morgendorffer from the MTV animated series Daria. This role was spun off from another MTV series, Beavis and Butt-Head, for which Grandstaff provided the voices of Daria and other minor characters.

== Career ==
She has written for various series on MTV, including The Tom Green Show and the annual Video Music Awards, and for other Viacom-owned networks, including Comedy Central and Nickelodeon. In April 2011 Grandstaff conducted an interview with the website Can I Get A Man With That to promote the DVD release of the complete series of Daria. On her view of the character eight years since the finale, Grandstaff said, "She is, was, and always will be the Misery Chick who loathes attention more than she loathes herself. Eight years later, there are new things that would totally annoy her—primarily words like totally and bestie. ...I don't see her as a sad character. I see her as tolerant of her unavoidable reality—eager to put the whole miserable experience behind her, so she could get out into the world and surround herself with people she actually admired and respected, or not."

She reprised her role of Daria Morgendorffer for a GPS device in 2010.

== Filmography ==
=== Television ===
| Year | Show | Role | Notes |
|---|---|---|---|
| 1993–1997, 2023–present | Beavis and Butt-Head | Daria Morgendorffer, Mrs. Stevenson, additional voices | 22 episodes |
| 1997–2001 | Daria | Daria Morgendorffer | 65 episodes |

=== Films ===
| Year | Film | Role | Notes |
|---|---|---|---|
| 2000 | Is It Fall Yet? | Daria Morgendorffer | Television film |
| 2002 | Is It College Yet? | Daria Morgendorffer | Television film |

=== Video games ===
| Year | Game | Role | Notes |
|---|---|---|---|
| 1995 | Beavis and Butt-head in Virtual Stupidity | Daria Morgendorffer, Mrs. Stevenson, others | |
| 1999 | Daria's Sick, Sad Life Planner | Daria Morgendorffer | |
| 2000 | Daria's Inferno | Daria Morgendorffer | |

=== Crew work ===
| Year | Show | Served As | Notes |
|---|---|---|---|
| 1992 | The Real World | Production assistant | |
| 1993 | Beavis and Butt-head | Writer of episode "True Crime" | |
| 1993 | Free Your Mind | Writer | |
| 1996–1999 | MTV Video Music Awards | Consultant (1996–99) and writer (1999) | |
| 1998 | Comedy Central's Hi Fi Party | Writer | |
| 1999–2003 | The Tom Green Show | Wrote 6 episodes | |
| 2001–2002 | Taina | Writer of episodes "Desperately Seeking Agent", "Bad Review", "Sabotag" & "Blue Mascara" | |
| 2005 | MTV Presents: Xbox, the Next Generation Revealed | Writer | |
