= Daria's Sick, Sad Life Planner =

1999 app developed by Hypnotix

- Cover art
- Developer(s): Hypnotix
- Initial release: November 13, 1999
- Operating system: Windows 95, Windows 98, Windows ME
- Type: Personal information manager
- License: Proprietary

Daria's Sick, Sad Life Planner is a 1999 app developed by Hypnotix and published by Simon & Schuster Interactive. It is based on the MTV animated series Daria. Like the television show, this software is oriented towards teenagers. It acts as a digital journal, address book, calendar, and planner with Daria-based themes, graphics, and quotes, as well as video and audio clips. The audio clips feature the same voice actors as on the TV show.

A reviewer from The New York Times gave the program a mixed review, stating that while the tools and accessories were useful, the Daria extras such as the screensavers and icons were disappointing. The reviewer also commented that the misanthropic Daria quotes and audio clips, such as Daria Morgendorffer commenting "Great, another person who pretends they like you" when adding a contact to the address book, made it hard to write anything enthusiastic or optimistic into the journal, concluding that the program may encourage anti-social thinking among teenagers.

Allgame gave the program 2 out of 5 stars. While praising some aspects such as the screensaver and the password protection feature, the reviewer stated that overall the program was dull and offered little to keep people interested in using it, concluding "Maybe the point is that it's supposed to be a little boring, as the title would indicate."
