= Karen Disher =

American actress

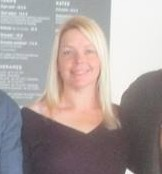
- Disher in 2015
- Born: Karen Beth Disher
- Education: Tisch School of the Arts
- Occupations: Film director, storyboard artist
- Years active: 1993–present
- Employer(s): MTV Animation (1994–2002); Blue Sky Studios (2002–2021); Spire Animation Studios (2021–2024); Locksmith Animation (2025)

Karen Beth Disher is an American film director and storyboard artist. Disher is best known for her work at MTV Animation, where she was the chief character designer and supervising director for the animated series Daria (1997–2002) following her previous work as a layout artist for Beavis and Butt-Head (1994–1997).

Disher is also known for work as a story artist at Blue Sky Studios, an in-house studio at 20th Century Animation, in which she worked on several films, including many in the Ice Age franchise.

== Life and career ==
Disher studied traditional 2D animation at NYU's Tisch School of the Arts. After graduation, she joined MTV Animation as a layout artist on Beavis and Butt-head. She then designed the main characters and was the supervising director on the hit series Daria. Meanwhile, she directed two TV feature-length installments in the series, Is It Fall Yet? in 2000 and the follow-up Is It College Yet? in 2002. She then joined Blue Sky Studios, where she worked as a story artist on many animated films, including Robots, Ice Age: The Meltdown, Horton Hears a Who!, Ice Age: Dawn of the Dinosaurs, The Peanuts Movie, and Ferdinand. She was also the head of story on Rio, and directed a short animated film Surviving Sid and a television special Ice Age: A Mammoth Christmas, both part of the Ice Age franchise. In addition to storyboarding and directing, she lent her voice to some minor characters in the films she worked on, most notably to Scratte in Ice Age: Dawn of the Dinosaurs.

In 2018, Disher was tapped to co-direct Blue Sky's first feature-length musical, "Foster", based on an original story written by Disher, co-director Steve Martino, and Tim Federle, with songs to be written by Benj Pasek and Justin Paul. This project was cancelled due to the closure of Blue Sky in 2021.

Disher joined Spire Animation Studios in 2021 as Creative Director, Development and is a founding member of the studio's brain trust, the "Creative Cadre".

== Filmography ==
=== Film ===
Year	Title	Role	Notes
1996	Beavis and Butt-head Do America		key pose artist
1999	Life		presenter, animator
2000	Is It Fall Yet?		director/original character development/supervising director
2002	Is It College Yet?		director/original character development/animation director
2005	Robots		storyboard artist
2006	Ice Age: The Meltdown		storyboard artist
2008	Horton Hears a Who!	Who Kid	storyboard artist
2008	Surviving Sid (short film)	S'more	director
2009	Ice Age: Dawn of the Dinosaurs	Scratte	storyboard artist
2011	Rio	Mother Bird	head of story
2012	Ice Age: Continental Drift	Scratte	storyboard artist
2013	Epic		storyboard artist
2014	Rio 2		storyboard artist
2015	The Peanuts Movie		storyboard artist
2016	Ice Age: Collision Course		storyboard artist
2017	Ferdinand		storyboard artist
2019	Spies in Disguise		additional story artist, Blue Sky senior creative team

=== Television ===
Year	Title	Role	Notes
1994–1997	Beavis and Butt-head		layout artist
1997–2002	Daria	Sally	supervising director/original character designer
2011	Ice Age: A Mammoth Christmas	Molehog	director

=== Video games ===
Year	Title	Role	Notes
2000	Daria's Inferno		creative consultant
2009	Ice Age: Dawn of the Dinosaurs	Scratte	Voice
