= The Real World: Pilot =

Season of television series

This is the pilot season of the now-infamous series The Real World. Prior to filming the series in 1992, six strangers were chosen to live in exactly the same loft that The Real World: New York cast would live in over Memorial Day Weekend 1991. The series was filmed entirely with Hi-8 cameras, no lighting system in the house, and an entirely different cast than what was used for the first season. This program was shot in NY on lower Broadway over a long weekend. Rob Klug was the original director and worked many creative ideas into show- Dutch angles and shooting hand held in streets. At the time people did not believe that you could shoot a high quality TV show with a small handheld camera, in a documentary style, and make it work.

== Cast ==
- Adam – 24 (New York, NY)
- Amy – 18 (Tulsa, OK)
- Dizzy – 23 (Queens, NY)
- Janel – 21 (New York, NY)
- Peter – 23 (New York City, NY)
- Tracy – 25 (Kalamazoo, MI)

== Series ==
The season was edited into three 22-minute episodes that were never intended to air on MTV. The pilot was intended to sell MTV executives on the idea of The Real World. The series, although filmed in the course of three days, followed the isolation of Adam, the naiveté of Amy, the flirtation of Peter and Tracy, a party the cast had in the loft, and a blind date that the producers set up for Tracy.
