= LAX (TV series) =

- Genre: Drama
- Created by: Nick Thiel
- Starring: Heather Locklear; Blair Underwood; Paul Leyden; Frank John Hughes; Wendy Hoopes; David Paetkau
- Opening theme: "Mr. Blue Sky" by Electric Light Orchestra
- Country of origin: United States
- Original language: English
- No. of seasons: 1
- No. of episodes: 13

Production
- Executive producers: Nick Thiel; Mark Gordon
- Producers: Dan E. Fesman; Heather Locklear; Ed Milkovich; Harry Victor; Nan Bernstein Freed
- Running time: 60 minutes
- Production companies: NBC Universal Television Studio; The Mark Gordon Company Nick Thiel Productions

Original release
- Network: NBC
- Release: September 13, 2004 – April 16, 2005

LAX is an American drama television series set at the Los Angeles International Airport, drawing its name from the airport's IATA airport code, "LAX". The series premiered on September 13, 2004, on NBC, and aired through April 16, 2005.

== Overview ==
LAX is a drama focusing on the day-to-day operations of the airport, with its runway manager, Harley Random (Heather Locklear), and its terminal manager, Roger de Souza (Blair Underwood). In the final episode, Harley leaves her job at LAX after she is told by Roger that he wants stability back in his life and no longer wants to be romantically involved with her.

LAX premiered on NBC on September 13, 2004. Ten episodes aired before NBC announced in November 2004 that no further episodes would be produced. The show was moved to Saturdays at 8pm ET and the final episode aired on April 16, 2005. Thirteen episodes total were aired.

== Cast ==
=== Main ===
- Heather Locklear as Harley Random
- Blair Underwood as Roger De Souza
- Paul Leyden as Tony Magulia
- Frank John Hughes as Henry Engels
- Wendy Hoopes as Betty
- David Paetkau as Nick

=== Recurring ===
- Joel David Moore as Eddie Carson
- Sasha Barrese as Caitlin Mansfield

=== Notable guests ===
- Chad Todhunter as Mystery Man
- Tony Hawk as himself
- Daniel Morton as a Serbian co-pilot
- Sam Doumit as Rachel, Senator's daughter
- Charisma Carpenter as Julie, Harley's sister

== Episodes ==
No.	Title	Directed by	Written by	Original release date	Prod. code
1	"Pilot"	Anthony and Joe Russo	Nick Thiel	September 13, 2004	101
The director of LAX has committed suicide, now two of his underlings fight for the position.
2	"Finnegan Again, Began Again"	Joe Russo	Paul Redford and Mark Thiel	September 20, 2004	102
Harley and Roger tries to find out the real identity of a living person who arrived in a casket. Tony tries to get a little league team on a plane to Albany. The staff tries to control a bird problem outside the airport.
3	"The Longest Day"	Anthony Russo	Jill Blotevogel	September 27, 2004	103
Roger uses his status and experience to control the situation when a plane he is on is disturbed by an electrical surge.
4	"Credible Threat"	Adam Davidson	Andrew Dettman	October 4, 2004	105
Homeland Security puts LAX on high alert. A man leaves his senile old mother at the airport.
5	"Abduction"	Scott Brazil	Kayla Alpert, Russel Friend and Garrett Lerner	October 11, 2004	104
The staff gets involved in a custody dispute involving an Arab couple.
6	"Unscheduled Arrivals"	Scott Brazil	Russel Friend and Garrett Lerner	October 18, 2004	106
A plane must make an emergency landing. Paparazzi are waiting at the airport for Prince William. An Uzbekistani man seeks asylum.
7	"Out of Control"	Adam Davidson	Don E. Fesman and Harry Victor	October 27, 2004	107
A suspended airtraffic controller takes the crew of the control tower hostage. Betty's dog attacks a passenger.
8	"The Pictures to Prove It"	Anthony Russo	Alexander Woo	November 3, 2004	108
A federal witness disappears at the airport. Caitlin helps an engaged couple.
9	"Thanksgiving"	Joe Russo	Andrew Dettmann and Kayla Alpert	November 10, 2004	109
An airline that is going out of business, cancels all of its flights. Harley is asked by her younger sister to spend Thanksgiving with her parents. Tony is taking care of a 10-year-old boy traveling alone.
10	"Secret Santa"	Félix Enríquez Alcalá	Russel Friend, Nick Thiel, Dan E. Fesman, Garrett Lerner and Harry Victor	November 17, 2004	110
The police search for a robber dressed as Santa Claus. Eddie applies for a job as Harleys assistant. Roger gets kicked out of his house because of his gambling addiction.
11	"Cease & Assist"	Craig Zisk	Andrew Dettmann, Harry Victor and Dan E. Fesman	March 19, 2005	111
An African political activist is on his way home for execution.
12	"Mixed Signals"	Anthony Russo	Story by : Nick Thiel, Russel Friend & Garrett Lerner; Teleplay by : Russel Friend & Garrett Lerner	March 26, 2005	112
An incoming airplane accidentally sends out a hijack warning.
13	"Senator's Daughter"	Joe Russo	Jon Hlavin	April 16, 2005	113
Roger has an affair with his wife's divorce attorney. The teenage daughter of a senator has brought home an illegal souvenir from Amsterdam. Harley thinks about an offer she received to run the Dallas/Fort Worth International Airport.

== Production ==
LAX (originally titled HUB, and then The Hub) was announced on NBC's development slate on December 19, 2003, after being scrapped by NBC during the previous development season in winter 2003. On January 14, NBC greenlighted production on the pilot. Anthony and Joe Russo signed on as directors of the pilot on February 6. On May 17, 2004, NBC announced that they had picked up the pilot to series. This show was not renewed for a second season.

Exterior shots for the pilot episode were filmed in Texas, although sources differ on whether Dallas/Fort Worth International Airport or Fort Worth Alliance Airport stood in for Los Angeles International. Many other scenes were filmed using a vacant terminal and a disused Boeing 727 at Ontario International Airport, interspersed with establishing shots of the real LAX airport.

The theme song for the show was the beginning of "Mr. Blue Sky" by Electric Light Orchestra. For the opening sequence of the final episode, a different excerpt of the song was used.

== Broadcast ==
LAX premiered on September 13, 2004, and ended on April 16, 2005, on NBC.

== Reception ==
In a survey by Philips, LAX got 17% of the votes for most anticipated new series.

The show was frequently the butt of comedic jokes due to its poor ratings, including Jay Leno, who remarked the show was "so bad that the actual Los Angeles Airport is thinking of changing its name to avoid being associated with the show." The 13 episodes of the program averaged 6.52 million viewers.

LAX lost 19.09% of the viewers in its time slot versus the previous season, which was occupied by Third Watch.
