= Is It Fall Yet? =

2000 television film

- DVD cover
- Written by: Glenn Eichler; Peggy Nicoll
- Directed by: Karen Disher; Guy Moore
- Voices of: Tracy Grandstaff; Wendy Hoopes; Julián Rebolledo; Marc Thompson; Alvaro J. Gonzalez; Carson Daly; Bif Naked; Dave Grohl
- Composers: George Brennan; Janet Wygal
- Country of origin: United States
- Original language: English

Production
- Executive producers: Glenn Eichler; Abby Terkuhle
- Producers: Cindy E. Brolsma; Amy Palmer
- Editor: Karen Sztajnberg
- Running time: 75 minutes
- Production company: MTV Animation

Original release
- Network: MTV
- Release: August 27, 2000

Related
- Is It College Yet?

Is It Fall Yet? is a 2000 American animated comedy-drama television film written by Glenn Eichler and Peggy Nicoll, and directed by Karen Disher and Guy Moore. Originally broadcast on August 27, 2000, it was the first of two film-length installments for MTV's animated series Daria.

The film chronicles the characters' summer break between seasons four and five. It was released on VHS and DVD on January 15, 2002, and was included on the DVD release of Daria: The Complete Animated Series on May 11, 2010.

== Plot ==
Though Daria and Jane are still on speaking terms, Jane is cold toward Daria, and their relationship is tense. Daria and Tom are seeing each other romantically, but due to Daria's personality and the gravity of the situation, they are taking things slowly. Jane has signed up for a summer art camp, seemingly to avoid Daria. At the camp, Jane meets Alison, an older artist, and the two bond over mutual contempt for their pretentious mentor and equally pretentious peers. However, Alison repeatedly tries to come onto Jane, dismissing Jane's protests that she is straight. The next time they meet, Jane signals uncertainty about her own sexuality. But this turns to anger when she realizes that, after previously putting down their pompous instructor to ingratiate herself with Jane, Alison is now sleeping with him to further her career. This causes Jane to become disillusioned with the art world.

Daria intends to do nothing but read, sleep, and go out for pizza with Tom, but her mother Helen forces her to work as a counselor at English teacher Timothy O'Neill's summer day camp for pre-pubescent children. There, Daria meets a nihilistic camper named Link, who constantly voices his disillusionment. It is loosely implied that he is neglected and emotionally abused by his mother and his stepfather. Recognizing herself in Link, Daria attempts to reach out to him. However, he rejects her overtures, causing Daria to feel worse. Paralleling these emotions is her relationship with Tom, which she effectively ends for the discomfort it brings.

After getting a poor score on a pre-college admissions exam, Quinn desperately wants to prove her intelligence without ruining her image in the fashion club. Helen hires David, a no-nonsense tutor who gets Quinn to take learning more seriously. As the tutoring gets results, Quinn realizes that she is interested in David romantically. At their final session, she confesses her feelings to him, but David says she is not his type due to her low academic aspirations, noting that the college Quinn wants to attend is a party school. In a heart-to-heart talk with Daria, Quinn shows how much the rejection hurt her, but Daria convinces her that it is worthwhile to "give people a chance" even though things might not work out. The talk makes Daria consider whether she broke up with Tom prematurely.

Daria comes to visit Jane, and, due to some meddling from Jane's brother Trent, the two reconcile. Daria later tells Jane that she was always impressed by Jane's strong sense of identity, which resolves Jane's identity crisis. Daria receives a letter from Link that invites her to email him, assuaging her fears that she is incapable of connecting with another human being. Jane affirms that she is no longer upset that Daria dated Tom and encourages her to get back together with him. In the final scene of the movie, Daria and Tom resume their relationship.

== Cast ==
- Tracy Grandstaff as Daria Morgendorffer
- Wendy Hoopes as Jane Lane, Helen Morgendorffer and Quinn Morgendorffer
- Julián Rebolledo as Jake Morgendorffer
- Alvaro J. Gonzales as Trent Lane
- Russell Hankin as Tom Sloane
- Marc Thompson as Anthony DiMartino, Timothy O'Neill, Kevin Thompson and Jamie White
- Tim Novikoff as Jeffy
- Steven Huppert as Joey
- Jessica Cyndee Jackson as Jodie Landon
- Amir Williams as Michael Jordan "Mack-Daddy" Mackenzie
- Janie Mertz/Lisa Kathleen Collins as Sandi Griffin and Brittany Taylor
- Sarah Drew as Stacy Rowe
- Ashley Albert as Tiffany Blum-Decker
- Nora Laudani as Angela Li
- Bart Fastbender as Andrew Landon
- Laurine Towler as Michele Landon
- Corey Block as Link
- Carson Daly as David Sorenson
- Dave Grohl as Daniel Dotson
- Bif Naked as Alison
- John Lynn as Sick, Sad World announcer
