= Jodie Landon =

Fictional animated series character

- Daria character
- First appearance: "The Invitation" (1997)
- Created by: Anne D. Bernstein
- Voiced by: Jessica Cydnee Jackson (Daria); Tracee Ellis Ross (Jodie)

In-universe information
- Gender: Female
- Occupation: High school student (Daria)
- Family: Andrew Landon (father); Michele Landon (mother); Evan Landon (brother); Rachel Landon (sister)

Jodie Landon is a fictional character from the MTV animated series Daria. She was voiced by Jessica Cydnee Jackson.

In 2020, Comedy Central ordered a spinoff series, Jodie, which will depict the character as a Generation Z post-college graduate entering her first job at a tech company. Tracee Ellis Ross was announced as an executive producer for the show and would voice the title role. In May 2022, it was announced that Jodie would instead be an animated television film but it was dropped by MTV Entertainment Studios and Comedy Central with the producers having the ability to shop it elsewhere.

== Daria ==
Jodie Landon is one of Lawndale High's few Black students. Her boyfriend throughout the series is Michael "Mack" Mackenzie.

In the Daria series finale Is It College Yet?, Jodie decides to attend the fictional Turner College, a historically Black college, despite being accepted to Crestmore, a fictional top college.
