= Susie Lewis =

American writer and producer

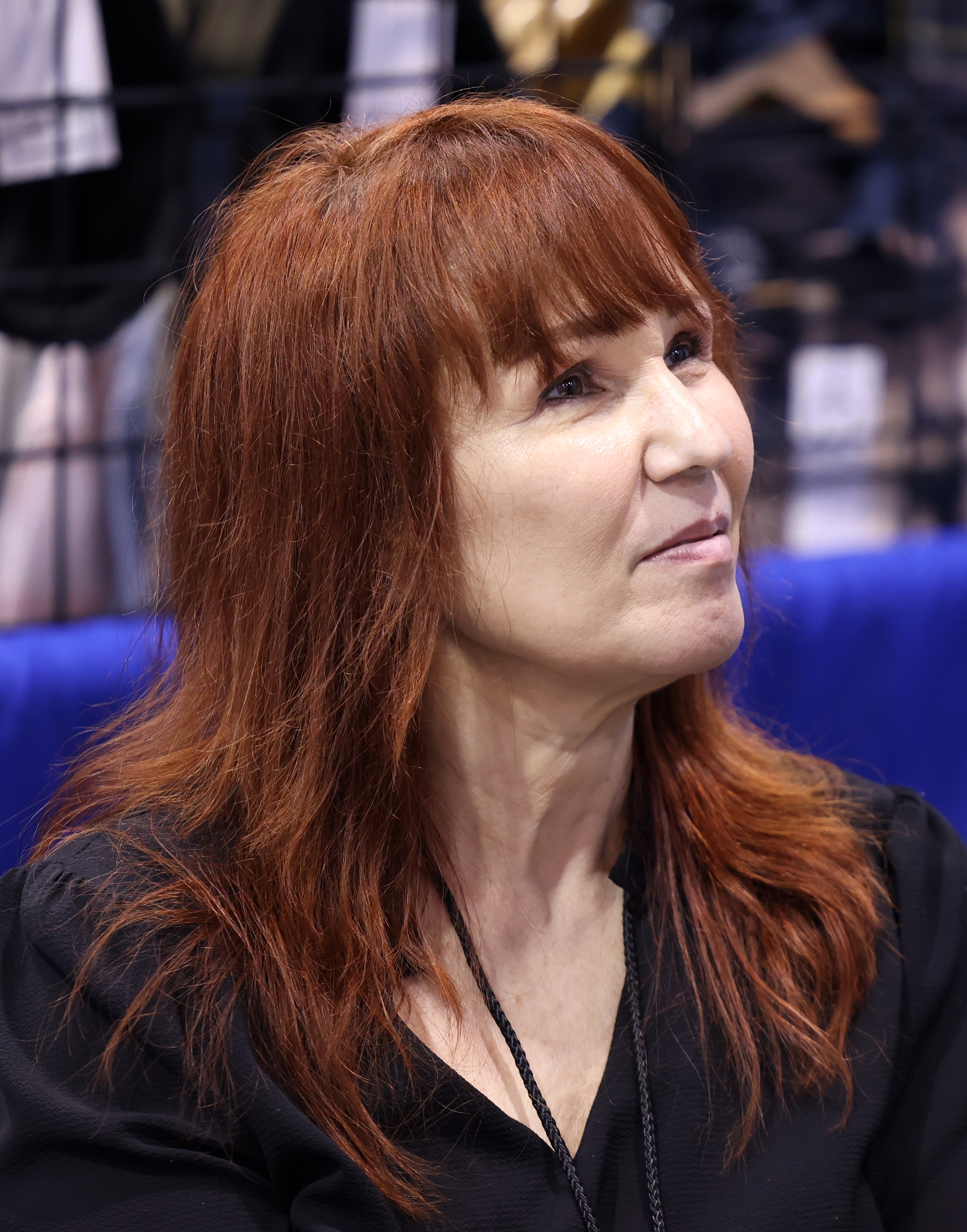
- Lewis in 2026
- Born: Oceanside, New York, U.S.
- Education: Temple University; New York Institute of Technology
- Occupations: Writer, television producer, voice actress
- Known for: Daria; Beavis and Butt-Head; Sea Rescue

Susie Lewis is an American writer and producer. She is best known for co-creating and producing the first three seasons of the satirical MTV adult animated series Daria, which originally aired from March 1997 to January 2002.

== Education ==
Lewis attended Temple University in Philadelphia, Pennsylvania, and graduated from New York Institute of Technology in New York City.

== Career ==
Lewis's career began after she applied for an internship at MTV and then began working on Beavis and Butt-Head producing the music video segments. She chose and edited the videos that the duo watched and oversaw the writing and recording of their comments. She and Glenn Eichler were later asked to become co-creators for a spin-off of the show called Daria, built around the character Daria Morgendorffer, who originally appeared as the intelligent, sarcastic foil to Beavis and Butthead. Daria came at a request for a "show for girls" from MTV executives, so it was fitting that one of the co-creators would be a woman, and that women would be a significant presence on the writing and directing teams.

== Filmography ==
TV Series and TV Series Shorts
Year	Title	Role
2019–2020	Player Select	Co-executive producer
2014–2021	Sea Rescue	Supervising producer (63 episodes)
2013	TakePart Live	Producer
2012–2013	AXSLive	Producer
2011	The Seven	Producer
2009–2010	Hip Hop Shop	Producer
2008	No. 1 Countdown: Rock	Supervising producer
2002–2003	Portal	Executive producer (2 episodes)
2002	Blister	Executive producer
2002	G4tv.com	Executive producer
2002	Cheat! Pringles Gamers Guide	Executive producer
2002	Filter	Executive producer
2002	Cinematech	Executive producer
2002	Player$	Executive producer
2002	Sweat	Executive producer
2001	Farmclub.com	Producer
1997–1999	Daria	Co-creator, writer, producer, creative supervisor (season 1-3), creative consultant (Season 4), voice actress (Andrea; Season 1 -3)
	Daria Dance Party (1999), Write Where It Hurts (1998), Fair Enough (1998) The Big House (1997), Cafe Disaffecto (1997), Too Cute (1997)	Voice actress (Andrea; Season 1-3)
	Pinch Sitter (1997)	Creative supervisor (1 episode)
1995	Beavis and Butt-Head	Co-producer (156 episodes)
1994	The Head	Voice actress (13 episodes)

TV Specials and Documentaries
Year	Title	Role
2006	The CMT Music Awards 2006	Coordinating Producer
2005	MTV Video Music Awards Latinoamérica	Coordinating Producer

Awards
Year	Title	For Work
2016	Daytime Emmy Award for Outstanding Children's Series	Sea Rescue
