= Daria Morgendorffer =

Fictional character in MTV animated series

- Daria / Beavis and Butt-Head character
- Daria as she appears in Daria
- First appearance: Beavis and Butt-Head: ‘’Scientific Stuff’’ (1993); Daria: ‘’Esteemsters’’ (1997)
- Last appearance: Daria: Is It College Yet? (2002); Beavis and Butt-Head: Beavis and Butt-Head Do the Universe (2022; main counterpart); The Discoverers (2025; Smart Daria)
- Created by: Mike Judge
- Designed by: Mike Judge
- Voiced by: Tracy Grandstaff

In-universe information
- Full name: Daria Morgendorffer
- Gender: Female
- Occupation: Student
- Family: Helen Morgendorffer (mother); Jake Morgendorffer (father); Quinn Morgendorffer (sister)
- Relatives: "Mad Dog" Morgendorffer (grandfather); Ruth Morgendorffer (grandmother); Mother Barksdale (grandmother); Rita Barksdale (aunt); Amy Barksdale (aunt); Erin Danielson (cousin)
- Nationality: American

Daria Morgendorffer is a fictional character and the title character of the American adult animated series Daria (1997–2002). She is voiced by Tracy Grandstaff. Daria was initially designed and created by Beavis and Butt-Head staff writer David Felton as a supporting character, serving as an intelligent foil to Beavis and Butt-Head.

MTV, which aired Beavis and Butt-Head, eventually sought to make an animated show catered more to female viewers; Glenn Eichler and Susie Lewis Lynn co-developed Daria. Mike Judge, creator of Beavis and Butt-Head, is officially credited as Daria's creator and designer.

The character received a positive response, being ranked at No. 41 on the TV Guide list of the "Top 50 Greatest Cartoon Characters of All Time" and No. 68 on AOL's list of the "100 Most Memorable Female TV Characters".

== Conception and development ==
Mike Judge created the Daria character on advice of the network. MTV senior vice president and creative director Abby Terkuhle explained that when Beavis and Butt-Head "became successful, we ... created Daria's character because we wanted a smart female who could serve as the foil." Terkuhle said that he added Daria "to put Beavis and Butt-Head in their place". Judge says that Daria was named for a girl he knew in school who, like the character, was saddled with the nickname "Diarrhea". Glenn Eichler, who created the Daria spin-off – sometimes incorrectly stated to be the character's creator as well – was, along with Peggy Nicoll, one of the main writers of the series; other writers were Neena Beber, Anne D. Bernstein, Rachelle Romberg, Rachel Lipman, and Sam Johnson.

== In Beavis and Butt-Head ==
In Daria's first incarnation as a recurring character on Beavis and Butt-Head, she formed an intelligent female foil to the two main characters. She went through three different outfits, had a stockier figure, and initially was a more expressive character; her iconic monotone voice developed over time. While she later became more sardonic, she showed early on that she could hold her own against the two and could react quickly to their antics.

In her debut episode, "Scientific Stuff", she was forced to do a science class presentation with Beavis and Butt-Head. At first, Daria is horrified by this and voiced out her complaints to Mrs. Dickie against having to work with the pair due to their history of stupidity and lack of common sense. She later turned it to her advantage by using them as the presentation's experiment. She had a minor role in her next two appearances, in "Babes R Us" and "Sign Here". In "Sign Here" she answered questions from David Van Driessen on furriers and their treatment of animals. In later appearances, she alternated between being irritated by their antics and finding their stupidity to be amusing: in "Sprout", she specifically came over to watch them fail at planting seeds, and in "Walkathon" she got them to unwittingly pledge $100 apiece on a charity walkathon. In "Sporting Goods" she gave three eye-popping gasps while Beavis and Butt-Head wear eye patches as athletic supporters, which is a dramatic contrast to her monotonous behavior in the later series. She lacked the passionate hatred for them that Principal McVicker and Coach Buzzcut had and was one of the very few characters that would willingly seek them out, but did not really believe there is any hope for them either, as Van Driessen had. On multiple occasions, she took it upon herself to explain simple concepts to them, such as informing them in "U.S. History" what graduation was (Beavis responded, "You mean, like ... school ends?") and in "Sprout" that you put seeds in the ground.

In a Christmas special, it is stated that Butt-Head had been responsible for giving her a negative outlook on boys. Aside from that, she was one of the few characters that the duo never managed to drive crazy as they had with many other students and teachers. Butt-Head sometimes treated her with some degree of respect, following her advice in "Sprout" and chuckling "Daria's cool!" after she asked Bill Clinton if "you were just jerking us around" on a campaign promise.

John J. O'Connor of The New York Times describes Daria "as sharp as B. & B. are dimwitted". John Allemang of The Globe and Mail described Daria in Beavis and Butt-Head "the prematurely wise girl who could be counted on to put their idiocy in perspective." Beavis and Butt-Head often call her "Diarrhea" and sometimes sing, "Diarrhea, cha-cha-cha" when noticing her.

In the final episode of season 7 (her only appearance in season 7 of Beavis and Butthead; by this time, her own series had been on the air for nearly 9 months), when the boys were believed dead, Daria expressed the sentiments that "I guess it's sad they're dead", but they did not have very bright futures to look forward to.

Daria appeared frequently in the Marvel Comics adaptation of the TV show, and also got to appear on the cover of one issue and "answer" the fan mail in two others. In Beavis and Butt-Head Do America, she appears once throughout the film with a group of students, but does not have any dialogue.

Daria's own show never mentioned Beavis and Butt-Head and named Highland only once at the beginning of the first episode of season one, carried over from the original and unbroadcast pilot. Despite this, it was frequently noted in media articles about the show that it was a spin-off from Beavis and Butt-Head. During a 1998 MTV music video countdown of the "Top 10 Animated Videos", in which Daria and Jane were the presenters, this was joked at when the Red Hot Chili Peppers's cover of "Love Rollercoaster" made for the movie Beavis and Butt-Head Do America clocked in at #2; Jane quips that "This one features two guys from Daria's past! Do the names "Beavis" and "Butt-Head" ring a bell?", to which Daria calls her a "ding-dork" afterwards. In an "interview" on CBS Early Show on January 21, 2002, Daria was asked by Jane Clayson if she kept in touch with Beavis and Butt-Head; she responded "I'd like to, but first they'd have to figure out that when the telephone makes that funny sound, you're supposed to pick it up and say hello".

As revealed in a Rolling Stone interview with Mike Judge, Daria would not return to the new episodes of Beavis and Butt-Head in 2011, but she was referenced in "Drones" during a music video when Beavis assumed she had committed suicide. However, Butt-Head incredulously tells his friend "What are you talking about, Beavis? Daria didn't die, she just moved away".

Daria made a brief, silent cameo in the 2022 Paramount+ film Beavis and Butt-Head Do the Universe, during Beavis and Butt-Head's sentencing, upset with the fact that the boys got off scot-free with their crime.

In the season finale episode of season 10, "Abduction", Daria's Smart counterpart, known as "Smart Daria", appears as one of the supreme leaders who sentences Smart Butt-Head and Smart Beavis back to earth to try to complete a mission or face the death sentence. Smart Daria also appears in the season finale of season 11, "The Discoverers".

== In Daria ==
In the series Daria, which followed Beavis and Butt-Head, Daria remains bespectacled and plain. She is an unfashionably dressed, highly intellectual, entirely pessimistic about life altogether, cynical, and sarcastic teenage girl who is portrayed as an icon of sanity in an insane household in an equally insane upper middle class suburb. She resides with her vacuous, fashion-obsessed younger sister Quinn and career-obsessed parents Helen and Jake. Their family name, "Morgendorffer" (lit. "one from Dawn Village", Morgen + Dorf + -er), indicates that her father's family originally hails from Germanic roots. John Allemang of The Globe and Mail said that Daria is "both the disappointment of her overachieving parents and an embarrassment to her boy-crazy sister Quinn". She had moved to a new school, having transferred from the one in Beavis and Butt-Head. Glenn Eichler said, in relation to Daria the series, of which he was a co-creator, "I like to think that I've helped her come out of her shell."

David L. Coddon of the San Diego Union-Tribune described Daria as "the anti-cheerleader, the un-social climber, the jaundiced eye in a cartoon world of too much makeup and superficial crayon colors". Coddon added that Daria "may look like a misfit, but the catch is that Daria's the only character on the show who 'gets it'. It's everyone else who's a misfit." Daria states in the first episode that she does not have low self-esteem: she has low esteem for everybody else. Anita Gates of The New York Times said "The secret of Daria's popularity (everywhere but in her own home and school) may be our collective alienation." Gates says "her tastes are a little dark." As an example, Gates used the fact that she reads "Howl" by Allen Ginsberg at a reading to the elderly program.

Eichler said, "Apparently everyone, with the exception of a very few people who were hit on the head when they were very young, felt like they were outsiders. You either identify with her as an outsider or you sort of envy her ability to navigate her life as an outsider and stay sane." John J. O'Connor, a television critic for The New York Times, said "In short, Daria is the perfect anti-Barbie Doll. Merchants of fashion and cosmetics are beneath her contempt. Her refusal to be Miss Goody Consumer borders on the truly subversive." He concludes that Daria "is every glorious misfit I ever knew".

Allemang said that in Daria, Daria "seems more tortured and neurotic, if only because it's more clear that the airheads have won". Daria often talks to herself. Allemang adds "in a perky-teen world with its twisted values, soliloquies are the best hope of intelligent conversation." In addition he said "There's nothing intrinsically wrong with Daria, just because she can't or won't hang out with the cool kids." John J. O'Connor of The New York Times said that Daria has "a withering eye" towards her classmates. Emily Nussbaum for Slate would praise the show both for having a character that many disaffected teenagers could relate to and for showing "the flipside of her principled withdrawal from the world: her crippling terror of rejection, a streak of ugly self-righteousness".

Daria likes to watch the fictitious television show Sick, Sad World. Gates added that "Daria is the kind of girl who reads Heart of Darkness and Edgar Allan Poe's 'Telltale Heart' in class."

=== Relationships with other characters ===
Anita Gates of The New York Times says "The Morgendorffers don't even seem to notice that Daria constantly gives them lip." In one scene, when Helen, her mother, says, "There's no course that can teach you to be a perfect mother," Daria responds "That's obvious." Gates says that "nobody sends her to her room". Gates also said that Daria's popular, self-absorbed sister Quinn is "the greatest burden on the home front". Jane Lane, Daria's best friend, met her at a self-esteem class. Gates adds that Jane "knows all of Daria's peculiarities and still loves her". Gates said that Daria's "silent intense crush" on Jane's brother Trent is her "only discernible weakness" and that "the absolute proof that Jane is a good friend is that she knows how Daria feels about Trent and will never, ever tell." In spite of her early infatuation with Trent, Daria's most significant romantic relationship is with Tom Sloane, who entered the show at the end of the third season and rapidly became Jane's love interest before beginning a relationship with Daria that continued throughout the rest of the show and caused some friction between Daria and Jane.

=== Movies ===
The first Daria movie, Is It Fall Yet?, gave the principal characters time apart from one another in parallel narratives which foreshadowed further changes in their relationships.

By the time of the finale movie Is It College Yet?, Daria's character has undergone noticeable growth. She chooses to attend Raft College. She graduates from Lawndale High, winning the Dian Fossey Award "for dazzling academic achievements in face of near total misanthropy", and crowning her acceptance speech with the assertion that "there is no aspect, no facet, no moment of life that can't be improved with pizza."

== Appearance ==
Daria has shoulder-length brown hair and wears glasses with round black frames. Her everyday outfit consists of an orange T-shirt underneath a green jacket, a black skirt, and black boots. John Allemang of The Globe and Mail said "to surrender is to be normal, to sacrifice your brain in the rush to be popular and wear uncomfortable shoes that make your legs look hot. Daria, as always, keeps her integrity. She wears sensible shoes, and finds her intellectual reward in not being hot."

In Beavis and Butt-Head, Daria wears square glasses, a black leather jacket, white T-shirt, a red skirt, black leggings and black boots. In the earlier episodes, she is seen wearing a brown jacket, beige skirt, green shirt and brown boots.

== MTV "host" ==
During her run on MTV, Daria would narrate or "host" special events and shows, either with a real-life presenter or with Jane. She was part of the Cool Crap Auction in 1999, giving an overview of the goods for auction and talking "live" to the winner of one prize, answering machine messages recorded by her. Daria and Jane also hosted MTV's Top Ten Animated Videos Countdown and two Daria Day marathons of their episodes; the Countdown and second marathon segments are included on the 2010 DVD release.

== Cameos ==
Daria makes a brief cameo in the Drawn Together episode "Lost in Parking Space, Part Two". She is being tortured in the basement of a Hot Topic along with other cartoon characters. She has a nail being hammered into her eye and says, "This is men's fault", in her infamous monotone and is rather indifferent to the pain. Also, at one point in the MTV animated series Undergrads, Gimpy is talking to his friends via webcam when a female hacker hacks into the video stream and edits Gimpy to look like Daria.

In late 2010, following the DVD release, Daria was licensed as a voice for Garmin and TomTom GPS systems; original putdowns and jokes were recorded.

In 2013, CollegeHumor created a parody trailer for a live-action Daria film starring Aubrey Plaza.

She appeared in The Simpsons episode "Bart vs. Itchy & Scratchy", on a poster of Cartoon Women's History.

She made a brief appearance in the Family Guy episode "Peter & Lois' Wedding", where a pre-handicapped Joe Swanson tried to flirt with her at the MTV Beach House in a flashback of the 1990s, only to be rejected.

Daria appears in the Robot Chicken episodes "Kramer vs. Showgirls" and "May Cause Weebles to Fall Down".

== Reception ==
Carol A. Stabile, author of Prime Time Animation: Television Animation and American Culture, said that "for the cerebral, writerly types who liked television Daria was the outcast she-hero who dared to say things they were too scared to say in their teenage years." Van Toffler, then the general manager of MTV, said in 1998 that Daria "has an attitude about parents, school, and siblings that is common to the experiences of our audience. She is a good spokesperson for MTV ... intelligent but subversive." A 1997 The Nation article referred to Daria as "a 10th grade Dorothy Parker". Another critic praising the character said that she is like "a 50-year-old deadpan Jewish comic in the body of a 16-year-old". Jennifer Vineyard, a writer of My Life as Liz, said "Daria made it cool to be a smart chick." Vineyard added, "Just the presence of people or characters like Daria help make it cool to be yourself. There's a tendency for young girls to play dumb. Characters like Daria show you that you don't have to."

Some commentators believed that the character's deadpan humor had too much morbidity for the teenage audience. A critic said that Daria uses her "omnivorous deadpan" contempt against other people, represented a variety of "living death", and was "a grim reaper in a dress" who was more dangerous than Marilyn Manson. Anita Gates of The New York Times said "And some people like her just because she says mean things. As far as I can tell, with her show well into its third season [...], Daria has never cracked a smile."
