= Glenn Eichler =

American comedy writer

- Born: c. 1956 (age 69–70); The Bronx, New York, U.S.
- Education: American University
- Occupations: Author, producer, magazine editor, story editor, screenwriter
- Writing career
- Years active: 1985–present

Glenn Eichler (born c. 1956) is an American comedy writer. He is best known for co-creating the MTV adult animated series Daria, which originally aired from 1997 to 2002. Eichler started out as an editor for National Lampoon magazine. He then worked as story editor for the MTV television shows Beavis and Butt-head and The Maxx. Apart from Daria, Eichler also produced Hey Joel for VH1. He has also written for such shows as Rugrats, Bratz, Married... with Children, and The Wrong Coast, a stop-motion animation mini-series for the American Movie Classics cable channel. He wrote for The Late Show with Stephen Colbert on CBS after also writing for Stephen Colbert in Comedy Central's The Colbert Report.

Eichler is the author of the humor books Mush!: Sled Dogs with Issues, Stuffed!, Bill and Hillary's Twelve-Step Guide to Recovery (a political satire), and Dr. Katz's Me At a Glance.

Because he was executive producer of Daria, he is sometimes claimed to be the creator of the character Daria Morgendorffer; this was actually the work of Beavis and Butt-head writer David Felton, with some input from Mike Judge.

== Personal life ==
Born in The Bronx, New York City and raised in New Rochelle, New York, Eichler produced a four-page joke newspaper as a pre-teen called the Wykagyl Wombat. He graduated from American University, where he majored in American literature and worked as a writer for a trade publication before finding work at the National Lampoon. Since 2000, he and his family have been residents of Montclair, New Jersey.
