= Hey Joel =

- Created by: Joel Stein
- Starring: Josh Alexander; Jon Cryer; Nancy Giles; Daphne Rubin-Vega; Jacob Tierney
- Theme music composer: Fountains of Wayne
- Opening theme: "Hey Joel" by Fountains of Wayne
- Ending theme: "Hey Joel" (instrumental)
- Country of origin: United States
- No. of seasons: 1
- No. of episodes: 13 (10 unaired)

Production
- Running time: 22 minutes
- Production companies: Curious Pictures; Six Point Harness; Blueprint Entertainment

Original release
- Network: VH1
- Release: June 3 – June 17, 2003

Hey Joel is an American adult animated television series that aired on VH1 in 2003. It is about Joel Stein, the host of a three-minute rock-star interview show on VH1 called "3 minutes with Joel". However, he is anything but respectful to his famous guests, often badgering them with aggressive, pointless, irreverent, and insulting questions.

The orignal concept, as pitched by Stein, had him doing real interviews with real celebrities for Time magazine, and basing the show around the celebrities' unscripted responses. After reviewing an unaired pilot, VH1 removed Stein from voicing his own character, and also from the writers room. Instead, Jon Cryer provided the voice for the part of Joel Stein, a character who now worked for a VH1 show. Joel's coworkers include Michele (Daphne Rubin-Vega), his producer, on whom he has a crush; Kevin (Jacob Tierney), his production assistant; Leif (Josh Alexander), his nemesis, who is VH1's star; and Z (Nancy Giles), the all-business head of programming.

The band Fountains of Wayne performs their own original compositions for the show, as each episode contains two musical sequences of approximately one-minute apiece. In these sequences, Fountains of Wayne appear as animated characters, singing brief songs that comment on the plot, characters, or the situations the show's characters are facing. Foountains of Wayne also wrote and performed the self-mocking theme song, which rather presciently stated:

Hey Joel, whaddaya know/
You got your own show/
Try not to blow it/
Cause if you're not funny then you'll soon be gone/
And they can fill the time with some more Lenny Kravitz songs/
And then you'll be back in obscurity where you belong/
Hey Joel!

The show was cancelled by VH1 after three episodes had aired. Stein wrote a 2004 piece for Time magazine on the experience, called "How I Nearly Killed VH1".

The complete series (including 10 further episodes that aired in Canada) was made available on DVD on June 24, 2008.

== Episodes ==
1. "Judgement Day"
2. "Tattoos and Taboos"
3. "Dream"
4. "Guitar"
5. "Dark Week"
6. "Big Rack Attack"
7. "Business Affairs"
8. "Joel Sells Out"
9. "Book'd"
10. "The Ur-man and the Seal"
11. "Hockey"
12. "The Niece"
13. "Project Televisionary"

== Reception ==
Saying the television series "simply isn't very good", Waterloo Region Record's Joel Rubinoff stated, "Blending elements of Martin Short's big-headed Jiminy Glick and Larry David's narcissistic super-geek on Curb Your Enthusiasm, Hey Joel's attempts at cheeky satire are amusing in small doses but too often come off as grating and overwrought."

Toronto Star television critic Rob Salem wrote about the show, "Does the whole add up to the sum of its parts? Well, yes and no. Given the entire music industry as source for satire, you would hope there would more of that and less of the intentionally annoying Stein." Emily Hutton of The Hamilton Spectator praised the show, writing, "I would definitely check out this show if you get Bravo, because it has the sarcastic humour (think David Spade as a cartoon) that many people enjoy."
