= Daria's Inferno =

2000 video game

- Cover art of Daria's Inferno
- Developer: Hypnotix
- Publisher: Simon & Schuster Interactive
- Platforms: Windows, Macintosh
- Release: 2000
- Genres: Adventure, puzzle
- Mode: Single-player

Daria's Inferno is a 2000 PC video game developed by Hypnotix and published by Simon & Schuster Interactive. The game is based on the MTV animated show Daria. Players control the character Daria Morgendorffer through the fictional town of Lawndale. Characters in the game are voiced by the same voice actors as on the TV show. The game is the only media ever to feature the TV series' entire theme song, "You're Standing on My Neck" by Splendora, only one verse of which is ever heard on the show.

== Gameplay ==
Daria's Inferno is played from an isometric perspective

The game uses third-person perspective and consists of five levels. Each level contains mazes to navigate as well as inventory-based puzzles. The graphics are styled in the same cartoon manner as the TV show. The game provides hints for what to do in the form of Sick, Sad World clips.

== Plot ==
Daria falls asleep in English class while Mr O'Neil is reading Dante's Inferno. She finds herself in her own inferno, taken from the distastes she finds in her world. In her dream, Daria must recover five items stolen from the school, or the entire student body will be placed in detention.

== Development ==
Daria's Inferno was exhibited at E3 2000, and was released in late 2000.

== Reception ==
Reception

Review scores
Publication	Score
AllGame	1.5/5
Just Adventure	C+
Entertainment Weekly	C−

Daria's Inferno received generally negative reviews.

AllGame graded the game 1½ stars out of 5, finding fault with the game's short length and ease of play, as well as disparaging the "dull and unimaginative" cartoon graphics. Just Adventure assigned the game a C+, stating that while the game was far from a classic, it deserved more attention. Entertainment Weekly gave it a C−, stating that the game was "nothing short of a trip to H-E-L-L." Four Fat Chicks gave the game a favorable review, praising both the gameplay and the game's "pure cartoon" graphics.
