= Halloweentown =

Halloweentown or Halloween Town may refer to:

- Halloweentown series
  - Halloweentown (film), a Disney Channel Original Movie released in 1998
  - Halloweentown II: Kalabar's Revenge, the sequel released in 2001
  - Halloweentown High, the third film in the series released in 2004
  - Return to Halloweentown, the fourth and final film in the series released in 2006
- Halloween Town, the main setting for the 1993 film Tim Burton's The Nightmare Before Christmas
- Halloween Town, the band headed by musical artist Ryan Pardey
