= List of Halloweentown characters =

This is a list of characters that appear in the Halloweentown film series.

== Main ==
=== Aggie Cromwell ===
Splendora Agatha "Aggie" Cromwell (portrayed by Debbie Reynolds) is the mother of Gwen and grandmother of Marnie, Dylan, and Sophie. She is the daughter of Merlin's cousin Marvin. It is unknown if Cromwell was her maiden name, or if she is widowed, as she is referred to by others as Mrs. Cromwell in Halloweentown High. She is a witch and resides in Halloweentown until Gwen offers to let her move to the human world and live with them at the end of the first film. She agrees but is having a hard time not using her magic. In the first two films, she carries a bottomless carpetbag that magically strolls along next to her as she walks. The carpet bag is very faithful to her as well as being slightly cowardly, as in the first film it is scared to jump off a flying bus, but does so when she pretends to leave without it. In Halloweentown High, she tries to fit in by taking various teaching jobs at Marnie and Dylan's high school and falls for the principal. She has a new bag that follows her around, this one resembling an alligator without a head that loves to eat. In Return to Halloweentown, it is revealed that during the dark times, Splendora Agatha Cromwell was the Princess of Halloweentown, who possessed the Gift, an ancient power. It was a necklace that had the power to give the wearer complete control over any person, but it could only be worn by a Cromwell witch or warlock. An evil battalion of dark warlocks and witches known as the Dominion sought the Gift and wanted Splendora to use it to dominate Halloweentown. Wanting to live like a regular witch, Splendora placed the Gift in a locked box and buried it under the ruins of Cromwell Castle, where Witch University currently sits. It is said that only her heir could unleash the Gift that is stored inside and use the power within it.

=== Gwen Piper ===
Gwendolyn "Gwen" Piper (née Cromwell) (portrayed by Judith Hoag) is the daughter of Aggie. She is the mother of Marnie, Dylan, and Sophie Piper. She was born as a witch in Halloweentown. When she was young, she dated Kalabar, and she also went on a date with the bogeyman. She gave up her magical heritage for William Piper (a mortal) and married him. Even after her husband was deceased, she continues to live in the mortal world, believing that it is better to be "normal" and hates Halloween. Since Halloweentown Gwen uses her magic more freely and it continues to grow with each film. In Halloweentown, she keeps Halloweentown a secret from her children and would prefer to raise them as a mortal, not allowing anything that has to do with magic or Halloween be mentioned in the house. Dylan agrees with her, but Marnie and Sophie do not like that. Gwen would often fight with her mother on the subject of whether or not she should allow her children to follow their family's tradition, especially Marnie, who is about to lose her powers forever after her 13th Halloween. At the end of the first film, she offers to let Aggie come live with them and agrees to have Marnie do her witch training. Although Gwen accepts her child's urge to connect more with the magical heritage, she continues to encourage Marnie to not let all that magic go to her head, though Gwen eventually begins to accept magic more and more through each film. In Halloweentown II: Kalabar's Revenge, Gwen meets a handsome single father named Alex but does not know that he is actually a golem created to lure her into a trap. He takes her to a Halloween party, where the warlock Kal turns her and everyone at the party into monsters. By combining their magic, her family manages to reverse the spell. In Halloweentown High, she helps Marnie joggle nine teenage kids of different mythical heritage. When they discover that someone is trying to steal their magic by failing Marnie's project, Gwen teleports herself to Halloweentown to find proof for the Halloweentown Council. In the end, Gwen rescues Cassie from her prison and returns to the mortal world in time to help stop the plot. In Return to Halloweentown, her children flew off for college and witch training, and she became a real estate agent and used magic to make the houses look better. When Dylan gets turned into a dog, Marnie calls for her help. She, Marnie, and Dylan combine their magic and "destroy" the Gift together.

=== Marnie Piper ===
Marnie Piper (also referred to as "Marnie Cromwell") (portrayed by Kimberly J. Brown in the first three films and Sara Paxton in the fourth film) is the oldest child of Gwen and William Piper, the granddaughter of Aggie, and the older sister of Dylan and Sophie. She is the main protagonist of the series, a young witch who has always loved the holiday of Halloween. Marnie is 13 years old in the first film, about 15 years old in the second, about 17 years old in the third and 18 years old in the fourth film. She is a pretty and headstrong individual, especially when it comes to magic. Like her grandmother and her sister, she has a sixth sense or precognition power as well as being an expert broomstick flyer. She is the character who uses magic as much as she can but also cares about it and tries very much to save Halloweentown and her magic. In Halloweentown, Marnie discovers for the first time about her witch heritage and becomes excited to start her training to be a witch. In Halloweentown II: Kalabar's Revenge, Marnie and her family combine their magic and create a portal that can be opened at any time around the year to stop a warlock from taking over the worlds. In Halloweentown High, Marnie bets on her family magic to persuade the Halloweentown Council to reunite the worlds of Halloweentown and the mortal world. In Return to Halloweentown, Marnie attends Witch University in Halloweentown and discovers a great secret about her family. She becomes Queen regnant of Halloweentown for one night, but uses the chance to apparently destroy the gift with the help of Gwen, Dylan, and her genie friend Aneesa, but only passes it on to Dylan, the one person she trusts not to abuse its power.

=== Dylan Piper ===
Dylan Piper (portrayed by Joey Zimmerman (Note: Credited as "Joseph Zimmerman" in the second film's end credits and "J. Paul Zimmerman" in the fourth film.)) is the middle child and only son of Gwen and William Piper, the grandson of Aggie, the younger brother of Marnie and the older brother of Sophie. Dylan is somewhat of a book nerd as he likes to study more than anything. He strongly dislikes Halloween and everything that goes with magic. Dylan is sarcastic and frequently teases his sisters, especially Marnie. He is the only warlock in the family, but doesn't like to use magic but will use it sparingly to help his family and study. In Halloweentown, Dylan is about 12 years old and remains skeptical about the existence of magic and the supernatural. His hands start to glow at the end of the film while being mad at Kalabar, indicating he has powers, which he uses to help in defeating Kalabar. In Halloweentown II: Kalabar's Revenge, Dylan tries to reach out to girls, but only ends up getting ditched and only uses his powers twice to help fix the worlds, first using them with his family and Luke to create a new permanent portal between the worlds and then – reluctantly, with the prodding of Luke – to break the spell on Benny. In Halloweentown High, Dylan does not use his powers at all and falls for a girl before finding out she was a pink troll. Though he does not use magic at all in this film, he states that he has tried to apologize to Natalie using magic to speed-up the speaking process. In Return to Halloweentown, Dylan attends Witch University with his sister and confesses that he used his powers to study rapidly in high school, which is the reason to why he skipped a grade and can attend college with his sister. He also falls for the evil Sinister sisters but they use him to get the gift - his family heirloom, so they can try to take over Halloweentown. Later, he becomes the wielder of the gift but decides to hide it in a book. He ends up using magic a few times in this film; he speed-reads to get the information on Splendora, admits to using it in high school, and uses it to help "destroy" the gift as it takes three Cromwells to do and only he, Gwen and Marnie were around. This is the most times he uses his powers in the films.

=== Luke ===
Luke (portrayed by Phillip Van Dyke) is the laid-back friend of Marnie's who resides in Halloweentown. He is a goblin but is changed to human form by Kalabar. In the end, he loses his human form after helping Marnie defeat Kalabar. He helps create the permanent portal between the worlds and helps Marnie learn how to reverse the Grey Spell but is not seen or mentioned again after the second film. In the first two films, he has a crush on Marnie.

=== Sophie Piper ===
Sophie Piper (portrayed by Emily Roeske) is the youngest child of Gwen and William Piper, the granddaughter of Aggie, and the younger sister of Marnie and Dylan. Like Marnie, she is also a witch. She can cast simple spells that she learns from her sister and grandmother. Unlike her older sister Marnie, the more advanced witch, Sophie appears to have a stronger hold on her precognitive powers. She can sense the presence of "bad things" to which she would always reply "Somebody's coming". She has a gift for remembering spells, something that Marnie continues to have trouble with, and is also resilient and quick at problem-solving. Sophie, like her sister and grandmother, has shown efficiency in conjuring. Along with her precognitive abilities, it appears that Sophie is telekinetic. In Halloweentown, Sophie is about 7 years old and can control her powers better than her sister can, as her grandmother states it only takes will and imagination for the magic to work. In Halloweentown II: Kalabar's Revenge, Sophie can sense Kal's presence, which her grandmother, mother, sister and brother cannot (although Gwen later can and Dylan indicates he senses something is wrong), but has a hard time controlling her flying abilities because Aggie had not taught her how to fly yet. In Halloweentown High, Sophie appears briefly and does not do magic at all. Sophie does not appear in Return to Halloweentown, but it is mentioned that she has started her witches training under her grandmother, Aggie.

=== Gort ===
Gort (portrayed by Blu Mankuma) is an ogre that collects junk in his house because everything that gets lost in other places (mortal or Halloweentown) ends up in his house. He hates cleaning and everyone he encounters. In the second film, Kalabar's son Kal casts the Grey Spell on the whole town, turning them into the boring versions of humans, and Gort becomes an opposite version of his true self.

=== Phil Flanagan ===
Principal Phil Flanagan (portrayed by Clifton Davis) is the principal of Marnie's school. He is a descendant of an army known as the Knights of the Iron Dagger. He originally helped Edgar Dalloway get the Cromwell's magic, but abandoned that job after he fell for Aggie Cromwell. Phil also admitted that he could not fit his finger into the ring that was associated with the Knights of the Iron Dagger.

=== Cody Trainer ===
Cody Trainer (portrayed by Finn Wittrock) is Marnie's love interest in the third film. He constantly tries to ask Marnie out but never gets the chance to succeed as she is always distracted. He finds out her secret after Gwen knocks him out thinking he is an enemy and Marnie takes him out on a broom ride. At first, he is a little freaked out but learns to accept it and gets everyone else to accept it in the end. He and Marnie apparently start dating in the end but he is not seen or mentioned again after the third film.

=== Cassie ===
Cassie (portrayed by Eliana Reyes), also known as Cassie the Witch, is one of the many foreign exchange students from "Canada" (a cover-up for Halloweentown). She is a witch. She is apparently Ethan's friend and Grandma Aggie's neighbor in Halloweentown. Unlike the other foreign exchange students, she is fascinated with human behavior and likes to study them. In the middle of the film, Cassie gets trapped in a witch's glass by Edgar Dalloway. In the end, she is rescued by Gwen.

=== Ethan Dalloway ===
Ethan Dalloway (portrayed by Lucas Grabeel), also known as Ethan the Warlock, is the son of Edgar Dalloway. He travels to the mortal world as part of an experiment to live among mortals and plays a friend of Marnie in the third installment, but after changing to turning against his own father to become good, he becomes Marnie's love interest in the fourth installment. Although he is a warlock, in the fourth film he says he renounced his powers after his father lost his to the Halloweentown Council. He is now a mortal like the Sinister sisters who also lost their powers because their father worked for the Dominion, but he and Marnie appear to continue their relationship. Ethan's father also worked for the Dominion once upon a time and Ethan gave up his powers upon his father's imprisonment.

=== Professor Priscilla Periwinkle ===
Professor Priscilla Persimmon Periwinkle (portrayed by Millicent Martin) is Marnie's literature professor at Witch University. She has worked undercover to arrest the Dominion for ten centuries and it was she who stripped their powers along with their families' at the end of the film. According to Professor Periwinkle, she and Aggie have been friends since the early times of Halloweentown.

=== Aneesa ===
Aneesa (portrayed by Summer Bishil) is a genie and Marnie's resident advisor at Witch University. She is the first genie to attend Witch University. When Marnie accepted the Gift, Aneesa was controlled for a brief time and helped Marnie destroy the gift forever with her magic lamp. At the end of the film with Aneesa's lamp gone, she says she needs a new place to stay and Marnie offers to have her as a roommate.

== Supporting ==
=== Benny ===
Benjamin C. "Benny" Deadman (voiced by Rino Romano in the first film and Richard Side [uncredited] in the second film) is a skeleton taxicab driver, who likes to joke a lot, although they are not as funny as he thinks. In Halloweentown, he gets possessed by Kalabar's evil magic sometime after Aggie and Gwen are paralyzed and goes after the Cromwell/Piper kids. Sophie was able to scare him off by attracting a nearby dog to him. When Kalabar is vanquished and his magic is reversed, Benny is returned to normal. In Halloweentown II: Kalabar's Revenge, Benny falls victim to the Grey Spell and becomes a boring version of his usual self (and also gets a flesh-and-blood body). He returns to normal when Dylan casts the reversal spell to undo his transformation. In Return to Halloweentown, he drives Marnie and Dylan to Witch University. Benny's full name is revealed when Marnie travels back in time to visit Splendora Cromwell, though the person who voiced him in this film was uncredited.

=== Natalie ===
Natalie (portrayed by Olesya Rulin) is one of the many foreign exchange students from "Canada" (a cover-up for Halloweentown). She is a pink troll and likes to hang out with Dylan. Because she is more comfortable in her troll form, she thinks humans look awful and disgusting including Dylan, but because he was nice to her, she considers Dylan as a friend. They nearly kiss, but because they both could not see the other physically attractive, they could not go through with it and decided to stick with being friends.

=== Chester ===
Chester (portrayed by Clayton Taylor in human form and Jesse Harward in monster form) is a blue-skinned teenager from Halloweentown. Chester's father was an ogre while his mother was a forest giant, making him a cross-breed of both species. He went to the mortal world as a transferred student from "Canada" (a cover-up for Halloweentown) to learn how to live among mortals. Because Chester is fond of stamps, he joins a club thanks to Marnie's advice. Chester has a pet armadillo named Buster.

=== Jessica ===
Jessica is a werecat from Halloweentown. She went to the mortal world as a transferred student from "Canada" (a cover-up for Halloweentown) to learn how to live among mortals. She is a werecat which means she does turn into a cat.

=== Nancy ===
Nancy is a wood nymph from Halloweentown. She went to the mortal world as a transferred student from "Canada" (a cover-up for Halloweentown) to learn how to live among mortals. Thanks to Marnie, she joins the gardening club.

=== Pete ===
Pete (portrayed by Todd Michael Schwartzman) is a teenage werewolf from Halloweentown. He went to the mortal world as a transferred student from "Canada" (a cover-up for Halloweentown) to learn how to live among mortals, and thanks to Marnie's advice, he joins the football team and becomes friends with the teammates. Even after he shows his real identity in front of everyone, they accept him for who he is. According to him and Cassie, most werewolves are vegetarians.

=== Zachary ===
Zachary is a teenage zombie from Halloweentown. He went to the mortal world as a transferred student from "Canada" (a cover-up for Halloweentown) to learn how to live among mortals.

=== Bobby ===
Bobby is a gremlin from Halloweentown, who moved to the mortal world as a transferred student from Canada (a cover up for Halloweentown) in order to learn how to live among mortals.

=== Burp-Urp-Snurt-Pfsfsfsfst III ===
Burp-Urp-Snurt-Pfsfsfsfst III (portrayed by Christopher Robin Miller (Note: Credited as "Christopher Miller" playing "Young Troll" in the fourth film's end credits even though the film lists him as a goblin.)) is a goblin that attends Witch University with Marnie and the Sinister Sisters. Because his name is hard to remember, the Sinister sisters call him "Snot Boy", but Marnie addresses him by the nickname "Grifflinn". Aneesa is the only one that can remember and pronounce his name. Though Aneesa can say his name she mostly calls him "Griff". Like most goblins, he tends to drool a lot when near or thinking about food or food-like substances.

== Villains ==
=== Kalabar ===
Kalabar (portrayed by Robin Thomas) is a warlock and former boyfriend of Gwen. He is the main antagonist of the first film. The spelling of his name is inconsistent between the first film and the second. In the opening credits of the first film, his name is spelled Calabar, but the subtitle of the second film spells his name Kalabar. Before the film, Kalabar is the Mayor of Halloweentown. He hates humans and dislikes the fact that Gwen left him for a human, yet the Cromwell magic remains as powerful as ever. At first, he was in the form of a black creature who is afraid of sunlight but reveals his true identity when he tries to convince the citizens of Halloweentown to join him to retake what is rightfully theirs, i.e. the mortal world. He dies at the end of the first film when the Cromwell family members join to vanquish him. He appears in Halloweentown II during several flashbacks to the previous film.

=== Kal ===
Kal (portrayed by Daniel Kountz) is Kalabar's secret son (his full name is hinted to be Kalabar Jr.) and the main antagonist of the second film. The spelling of his name is inconsistent, much like that of his father's. The subtitle of the film, Kalabar's Revenge, implies that his name is spelled Kal, but the end credits spell his name Cal. He tricked Marnie into showing him Aggie's secret room and stole Aggie's spellbooks to prevent her and her family from stopping his plan to dominate both worlds. He also seems to have an infatuation with Marnie Cromwell. When Marnie takes back the spellbooks, he vanishes. Although Luke says that he will be back after he disappeared, he has not been seen or mentioned since then.

=== Alex ===
Alex (portrayed by Peter Wingfield) is a golem made of frogs and Kal's partner. He is the secondary antagonist of the second film. Because Kal created him, he had no choice but to take his orders to attract Gwen and make her wear a Halloween mask, which is used later to turn her into a monster when Kal casts the Creature Spell on the mortal world. Thanks to Dylan and Sophie, Gwen manages to find out what he really is and he is then turned back into a bunch of frogs.

=== Edgar Dalloway ===
Edgar Dalloway (portrayed by Michael Flynn) is the main antagonist of the third film. He is a warlock who is the former head of the Halloweentown Council and wants the portal closed for good. He also desires the Cromwell magic, and tries every scheme possible to get it. He nearly succeeds but is stopped when Marnie proves that humans really have changed and Gwen returns with Cassie whom she rescued from where Edgar trapped her. The Cromwell witches retake their powers from Edgar. The Halloweentown High Council (deciding to give humans another chance) trap Edgar in Aggie's Witch's Glass resigning him from the Halloweentown High Council. He does not appear in the fourth film, but his son Ethan reveals to Marnie that his father had lost his magic after the events of the third film and also that he used to belong to a coven known as the Dominion, formed by seven evil witches and warlocks.

=== The Dominion ===
The Dominion is an ancient evil organization that appears in Return to Halloweentown. It was founded 1,000 years ago where they sought out "The Gift" that would enable them to take over both Earth and Halloweentown.

==== Silas Sinister ====
Silas Sinister (portrayed by Keone Young) is a warlock who is the head of the Sinister, Inc., father of the Sinister Sisters, the leader of the Dominion, and the main antagonist of the fourth film. He and his group targeted a box that contained the key to dominating Halloweentown. He and the other Dominion members are stripped of their magic powers and arrested by Professor Periwinkle (who was working for an Anti-Dominion movement) for their acts of treason.

==== Lwaxana Goodwin ====
Dr. Goodwin (portrayed by Leslie Wing), also known as Chancellor Lwaxana Goodwin, is the elegant and well-spoken chancellor of Witch University. She is the one who gave Marnie a full scholarship, mainly because her interest in her is not just educational, but also because she holds the key to opening a locked box containing the key to dominating Halloweentown. She along with the rest of the Dominion were stripped of their powers by Professor Periwinkle and arrested for treason upon being placed in a Witch's Glass.

==== Ichabod Grogg ====
Dr. Ichabod Grogg (portrayed by Scott Stevensen) is a stuffy, strict, and cranky old professor at Witch University. He is another member of The Dominion with the Chancellor and Mr. Sinister. He along with the rest of the Dominion were stripped of their powers by Professor Periwinkle and arrested for treason upon being placed in a Witch's Glass.

==== The Sinister Sisters ====
Scarlett, Sage, and Sapphire Sinister (portrayed by Kristy Wu, Katie Cockrell, and Kellie Cockrell), known together as The Sinister Sisters, are evil witches attending Witch University and the daughters of Silas Sinister. While Sage and Sapphire act as the twin-followers, Scarlett acts as the ringleader. They secretly defy the "No Magic" rule by using their powers whenever there is no teacher watching. They work with a few professors and their father to make Marnie open a box with the Cromwell family's ultimate magic in it. In the end, their plan backfires and they lose their family magic as punishment for their father's crimes.

== Other ==
=== Harriet ===
Harriet (portrayed by Judith M. Ford) is a friend of Aggie's. She volunteers at a place where the patients there have no heads. She was turned into a hideous creature a couple hours after she met Aggie and later was frozen at the theater, but returned to her true self after Kalabar's magic was reversed.

=== The Halloweentown Council ===
The Halloweentown Council is the highest-ranking authority in Halloweentown. Besides Edgar Dalloway, the Halloweentown Council consisted of a six-armed man (portrayed by Jeff Olson), a pumpkinhead (portrayed by Frank Gerrish), a female vampire (portrayed by Mowava Pryor), and a male mummy (portrayed by an uncredited Aaron Justesen). Marnie had to wager the Cromwell Family magic in exchange that they let some students from Halloweentown attend Marnie's school while disguised as humans from Canada. The Halloweentown Council later summon Marnie when they voice their concerns about the Knights of the Iron Dagger being sighted near the school. After Edgar was defeated and Gwen shows the Cromwell Family proving their worth by having the students be accepted for who they are, the Halloweentown Council returns the magic to the Cromwell Family. Then they resign Edgar from the Halloweentown Council upon imprisoning him in a Witch's Glass.

=== William Piper ===
William Piper (portrayed by uncredited Mark Everest) is a mortal that Gwen fell in love with and the father of Marnie, Dylan, and Sophie. She subsequently moved to the mortal world and stopped using magic, which upset and possibly angered Aggie, and it is implied that by the time of the films he died. The character is only seen in Halloweentown in a family photo.
