= Halloweentown (film series) =

1998–2006 American television film series

- Official film series logo
- Created by: Paul Bernbaum
- Owners: Disney Channel; (The Walt Disney Company)
- Years: 1998–2020

Films and television
- Short films: Halloweentown: As Told by Chibi (2020); Halloweentown: Haircut (2020); Halloweentown: First Date Fright (2020)
- Television films: Halloweentown (1998); Halloweentown II: Kalabar's Revenge (2001); Halloweentown High (2004); Return to Halloweentown (2006)

Halloweentown is an American television series of four fantasy films released as Disney Channel Original Movies: Halloweentown (1998), Halloweentown II: Kalabar's Revenge (2001), Halloweentown High (2004), and Return to Halloweentown (2006). A fifth film is in development.

== Background ==
Halloweentown proposes that fantasy beings such as warlocks, vampires, werewolves, mummies, ghosts, trolls, ogres, zombies, pumpkin heads (a race of people with jack-o'-lanterns for heads), skeletons, goblins, and humanoids with varying numbers of heads, limbs, and sensory organs are real, but have separated themselves from Earth's history to escape humans' fear and persecution. These characters created their own community, "Halloweentown", a thousand years ago in an alternate universe.

Travel between Halloweentown and the ordinary, historical world (which Halloweentown residents call "The Mortal World") is only possible with magical aid, and only at regulated times (on Halloween), until the portal seals at midnight. In the second film, they permanently open the portal between the Mortal World and Halloweentown, and events of the third film breach the gap even more.

It is stated that many of the traditions of Halloween in the Mortal World are parallels based on regular traditions in Halloweentown. An example of this is how mortals wear costumes that mimic the creatures of Halloweentown, and are often depicted as being more frightening than they are naturally. In Halloweentown, the residents dress up every day, and most are much friendlier than humans generally depict them.

Although magic is present in many of the details of daily life of Halloweentown, it appears that only a limited number of persons actually practice or control magic. These people are mainly human, and are called witches (female) and warlocks (male). These beings appear human, but possess some sort of biological extra-sensory ability that allows them to harness magic unlike their "mortal" counterparts. Magic is also hereditary in their families.

The Halloweentown films concern episodes in the lives of the Cromwell–Piper family. The family matriarch, Agatha Cromwell, has been a pillar of Halloweentown society for centuries. Her daughter, Gwen Piper, married a mortal and chose to leave Halloweentown for a life in the Mortal World. At the time of the films, she is apparently widowed. She has decided to raise her three children (Marnie, Dylan and Sophie) apart from magic, and thus rejects contact with Halloweentown and the influence of her mother.

== Films ==
Title	U.S. release date	Director	Screenwriters	Story by	Producer(s)
Halloweentown	October 17, 1998	Duwayne Dunham	Jon Cooksey, Ali Matheson & Paul Bernbaum	Paul Bernbaum	Brian Pogue & Ron Mitchell
Halloweentown II: Kalabar's Revenge	October 12, 2001	Mary Lambert	Jon Cooksey & Ali Matheson		Peter Lhotka
Halloweentown High	October 8, 2004	Mark A.Z. Dippé	Dan Berendsen		Don Schain
Return to Halloweentown	October 20, 2006	David Jackson	Max Enscoe, Keith Giglio, Annie DeYoung & Juliet Giglio		Don Schain

=== Halloweentown (1998) ===
In the first film, Marnie Piper (Kimberly J. Brown), her brother Dylan (Joey Zimmerman), and her sister Sophie (Emily Roeske) discover they come from a family of witches.

=== Halloweentown II: Kalabar's Revenge (2001) ===
Two years after the first film, an angry warlock named Kal (Daniel Kountz) has stolen a magic spell book and plans to turn everyone into the costume they are wearing at midnight on Halloween.

=== Halloweentown High (2004) ===
Two years after the second film, Marnie Piper (Kimberly J. Brown) organizes a student exchange program between her mortal school and Halloweentown High. The first students to participate in this program are a witch named Cassie (Eliana Reyes), a warlock named Ethan Dalloway (Lucas Grabeel), a troll named Natalie (Olesya Rulin), and an ogre named Chester (Clayton Taylor).

=== Return to Halloweentown (2006) ===
In the fourth film, Marnie Piper (Sara Paxton) arrives at the Halloweentown University, known to everyone as Witch U. The teachers have been waiting for her arrival to fulfill a prophecy.

=== Halloweentown 5 ===
In 2017, producer Sheri Singer expressed interest in doing a fifth film, but would need Disney to sign off. Brown had previously expressed interest in reprising her role as Marnie Piper should a fifth film ever materialize. In a 2020 interview with E!, Phillip Van Dyke expressed interest in returning for another film if the rest of the cast also returned. In October 2026, a fifth film was announced to be in development at Disney Kids & Family with Lily Houghton and Ryan Koehn developing the script.

== Novelization ==
=== Tales From Halloweentown: The Witch's Amulet (2007) ===
In 2007, Disney produced the book Tales From Halloween: The Witch's Amulet, heavily based upon the fourth installment in the franchise, Return to Halloweentown. Set during summer break at Witch University, the plot follows Marnie becoming a Resident Advisor by keeping an eye on her young sister, Sophie, who is enrolled in the university's junior sorcery school. At Witch University, Dylan is working as a lab assistant to Professor La Biel, a powerful warlock who is developing a youth serum. When La Biel steals The Gift, an amulet that gives its wearer ultimate power over hearts and minds, it is up to Marnie to stop the cunning warlock before her entire family falls into La Biel's spell. The ending of the book leaves plenty of room for a sequel.

== Short films ==
=== Halloweentown: As Told by Chibi (2020) ===
Halloweentown: As Told by Chibi, released on October 4, 2020, continued the trend started by Big Hero 6: The Series of creating spin-off shorts such as Big Chibi 6 The Shorts. This was followed by other series such as Amphibia and Phineas and Ferb, which also had their own versions known as Chibi Tiny Tales. Each of these shorts offers a simplified retelling of their respective stories.

=== Halloweentown: Haircut (2020) ===
Halloweentown: Haircut was released on October 11, 2020. The plot revolves around Marnie, who wants to use magic to cut her hair, but her grandmother, Agatha 'Aggie' Cromwell, has a different plan in mind.

=== Halloweentown: First Date Fright (2020) ===
Halloweentown: First Date Fright was released on October 18, 2020. The plot revolves around Marnie's date with Luke in the world of Halloweentown, but the magical dishes served at the dinner are too much for her to handle.

== Cast and characters ==
Characters	Films			
Characters	Halloweentown	Halloweentown II: Kalabar's Revenge	Halloweentown High	Return to Halloweentown
Characters	1998	2001	2004	2006
Agatha "Aggie" Cromwell	Debbie Reynolds	Debbie Reynolds	Debbie Reynolds	Debbie Reynolds Sara Paxton^{Y}
Marnie Piper	Kimberly J. Brown	Kimberly J. Brown	Kimberly J. Brown	Sara Paxton
Gwen Piper	Judith Hoag	Judith Hoag	Judith Hoag	Judith Hoag
Dylan Piper	Joey Zimmerman	Joey Zimmerman	Joey Zimmerman	Joey Zimmerman
Sophie Piper	Emily Roeske	Emily Roeske	Emily Roeske	
Luke	Phillip Van Dyke	Phillip Van Dyke		
Benny	Rino Romano	Richard Side		Uncredited
Mayor Kalabar	Robin Thomas			
Harriet	Judith M. Ford			
Kalabar Jr. "Kal"		Daniel Kountz		
Astrid		Xantha Radley		
Alex		Peter Wingfield		
Gort		Blu Mankuma		
Ethan Dalloway			Lucas Grabeel	Lucas Grabeel
Edgar Dalloway			Michael Flynn	
Cody			Finn Wittrock	
Cassie			Eliana Reyes	
Principal Phil Flanagan			Clifton Davis	
Pete			Todd Michael Schwartzman	
Chester			Jessie Harward	
Natalie			Olesya Rulin	
Bobby			Bob Lanoue	
Scarlett				Kristy Wu
Sage				Katie Cockrell
Sapphire				Kellie Cockrell
Silas Sinister				Keone Young
Chancellor Goodwin				Leslie Wing-Pomeroy
Professor Priscilla Periwinkle				Millicent Martin Brighton Hertford^{Y}
Dr. Grogg				Scott Stevenson
Aneesa				Summer Bishil
Burp-Urp-Snurt-Pfsfsfsfst III				Christopher Miller

== Additional crew and production details ==
Film	Crew/Detail					
Film	Composer	Cinematographer	Editor	Production companies	Distributing companies	Running time
Halloweentown	Mark Mothersbaugh	Michael Slovis	Martin Nicholson	Disney Channel Original Movies, Singer-White Entertainment, Ventura Valley Films	Disney Channel, Buena Vista Television	1hr 24mins
Halloweentown II: Kalabar's Revenge	Mark Mothersbaugh	Tony Westman	Sharon L. Ross	Disney Channel Original Movies, Just Singer Entertainment	Disney Channel, Buena Vista International, Disney–ABC Domestic Television	1hr 21mins
Halloweentown High	Kenneth Burgomaster	Bob Seaman	Terry Blythe	Disney Channel Original Movies, Just Singer Entertainment, Reel FX Creative Studios	Disney Channel, Disney-ABC Domestic Television	1hr 22mins
Return to Halloweentown	Kenneth Burgomaster	Denis Maloney	Mike Grant	Disney Channel Original Movies, Just Singer Entertainment	Disney Channel, Disney-ABC Domestic Television, Walt Disney Television	1hr 28mins

== Viewership ratings ==
Film	Ratings (in millions)
Halloweentown	3.4
Halloweentown II: Kalabar's Revenge	6.1
Halloweentown High	6.1
Return to Halloweentown	7.5

== See also ==
- Hocus Pocus series
- List of films set around Halloween
