= Sophie Piper (disambiguation) =

Sophie Piper was a Swedish countess.

Sophie Piper may also refer to:

- Sophie Piper (Halloweentown)
- Sophie Piper (Love Island)
