= Kimberly J. Brown =

American actress (born 1984)

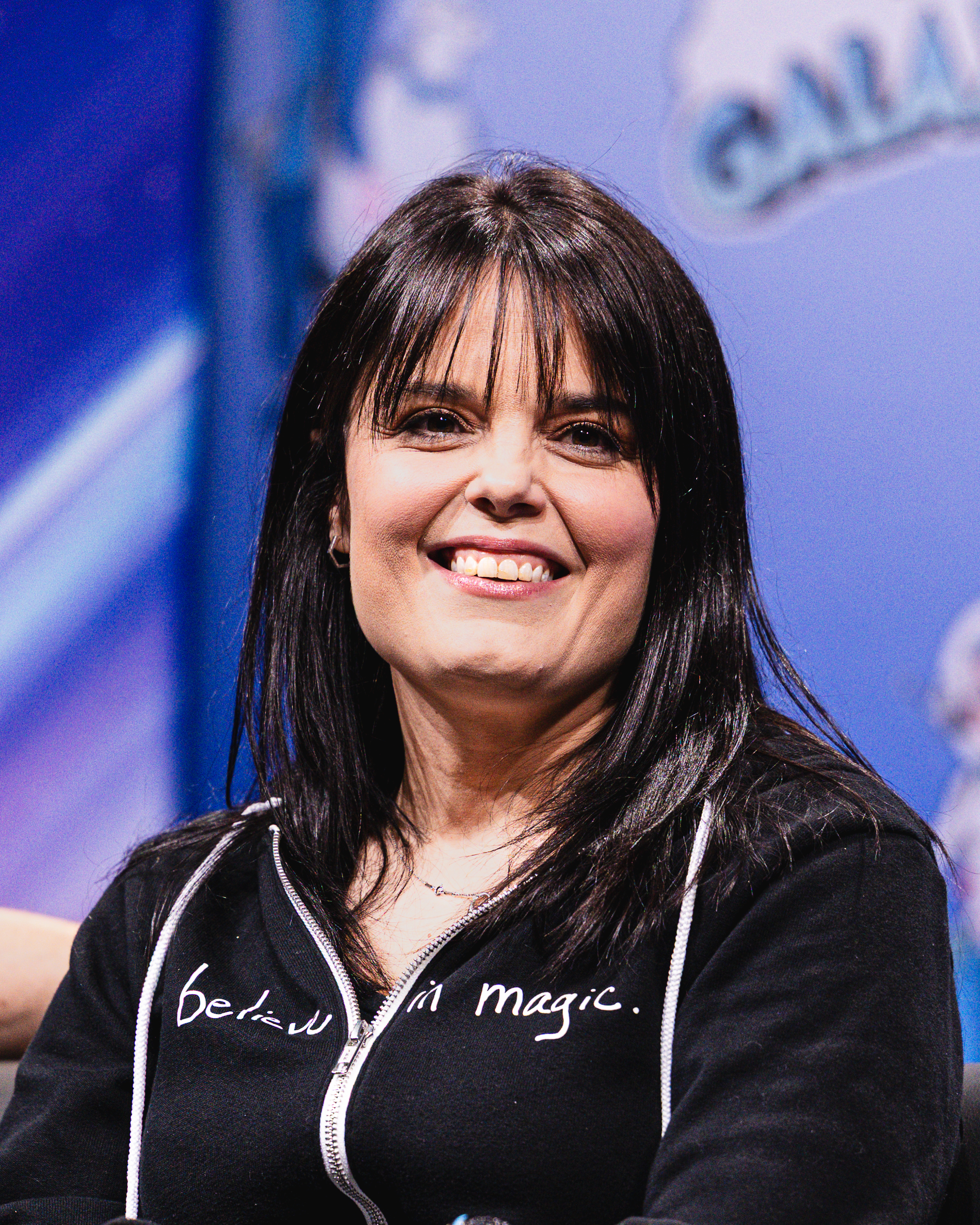
- Brown in 2026
- Born: Kimberly Jean Brown; November 16, 1984 (age 41); Gaithersburg, Maryland, U.S.
- Occupation: Actress
- Years active: 1989–present
- Notable work: Guiding Light; Halloweentown
- Spouse: Daniel Kountz (m. 2024)
- Website: www.kimberlyjbrown.com

Kimberly Jean Brown (born November 16, 1984) is an American actress. She is best known for her leading role as teen witch Marnie Piper in the Halloweentown film series (1998–2004), co-starring Debbie Reynolds.

Brown first gained recognition for her portrayal of Marah Lewis in the CBS soap opera Guiding Light (1993–1998, 2006), which earned her a nomination for the Daytime Emmy Award for Outstanding Younger Actress in a Drama Series. She garnered further critical acclaim for her performance as Ava Walker in the comedy-drama film Tumbleweeds (1999), for which she won the Independent Spirit Award for Best Breakthrough Performance. Brown also starred as Annie Wheaton in the ABC horror miniseries Rose Red (2002), which was written by Stephen King. She appeared in the comedy film Bringing Down the House (2003), the horror film Big Bad Wolf (2006), and the comedy film Friendship! (2010).

== Early life ==
Kimberly J. Brown was born on November 16, 1984, in Gaithersburg, Maryland. She attended university at College of the Canyons in Santa Clarita, California. In a 2010 interview, Brown said that she was close to graduating from the university, although she did not disclose what her major was at the time. She would later reveal in 2018 that she graduated with a Bachelor of Science degree in business.

== Career ==
Brown began her career at age five. By the time she was 11, she had enjoyed success as a child model with Ford Models, performed in multiple Broadway shows and earned an Emmy nomination for her portrayal of Marah Lewis on Guiding Light. She found work as a voice actress, lending her voice to commercials, A Bug's Life, and the English dub of Vampire Princess Miyu.

At 13, Brown was cast in her most notable film to date, the Disney Channel Original Movie Halloweentown. In the movie, she played 13-year-old Marnie Piper, a young witch who is determined to learn magic from her grandmother Aggie, portrayed by Debbie Reynolds. In September 2016, Brown recalled an audition for the film in which she had to react to a conversation when it was revealed that the character Marnie is a witch. Brown read for the role twice before being cast. Halloweentown aired on October 17, 1998 and was well received by audiences, leading Disney Channel to produce three sequels; Brown reprised her role as Marnie in two of them. She was replaced by Sara Paxton in the fourth installment, Return to Halloweentown, a decision over which Brown expressed confusion and disappointment. Fans of the franchise were unhappy with Paxton's portrayal of the character, reflected in BuzzFeed writing that the fourth movie, with its "False Marnie", is best left ignored, and MTV News writing that fans should act as if the fourth film had never happened. She is a fixture at the annual "Spirit of Halloweentown" festival in St. Helens, Oregon honoring the franchise.

Outside of Halloweentown, Brown also starred in another Disney Channel original movie, the 2000 film Quints. In 1999, Brown co-starred with Janet McTeer in Tumbleweeds which received positive reviews.

In May 2021, it was announced she had joined the cast of General Hospital.

In June 2025, it was announced that Brown would be starring in the TV movie Haul Out the Halloween for the Hallmark Channel opposite Lacey Chabert and her husband Daniel Kountz. The film was released on October 11, 2025.

=== Other ventures ===
Brown and a friend run the Etsy shop CraftilyCreative, which sells a variety of items, including Halloweentown-themed merchandise.

== Personal life ==
Kimberly Brown and Daniel Kountz at GalaxyCon San Jose in San Jose, CA August, 29, 2026

In 2016, she reconnected with Halloweentown II co-star Daniel Kountz for a Halloweentown-themed project for Brown's YouTube channel, and they soon began dating. In June 2022, Brown announced they were engaged. In April 2024, the couple were married.

== Filmography ==
=== Film ===
Year	Title	Role	Notes
1998	A Bug's Life	Female Ants (voice)	
1999	Tumbleweeds	Ava Walker	
2001	The Little Polar Bear	Lena, Manilli (voices)	English dub
2003	Bringing Down the House	Sarah Sanderson	
2005	Be Cool	Tiffany	
2006	Big Bad Wolf	Sam Marche	
2010	Friendship!	Dorothee	

=== Television ===
Year	Title	Role	Notes
1990	The Baby-Sitters Club	Amanda Delaney	Episode: "The Baby-Sitters Remember"
1993–1998 & 2006	Guiding Light	Marah Lewis	Recurring role
1997	Vampire Princess Miyu	Miyu Yamano	Voice role (English dub), 7 episodes
1997	Ellen Foster	Dora	Television film
1998	Unhappily Ever After	Helena, Girl #1	3 episodes
1998	Halloweentown	Marnie Piper	Television film
1998–1999	Two of a Kind	Nicole	2 episodes
1999	Touched by an Angel	Amy Lumpkin	Episode: "The Last Day of the Rest of Your Life"
2000	Quints	Jamie Grover	Television film
2001	Halloweentown II: Kalabar's Revenge	Marnie Piper	Television film
2002	My Sister's Keeper	Young Christine Chapman	Television film
2002	Rose Red	Annie Wheaton	Miniseries
2003	Law & Order: Special Victims Unit	Jessica Morse / Margory Maddox	Episode: "Perfect"
2004	Halloweentown High	Marnie Piper	Disney Channel Original Movie
2013	Low Winter Sun	Shana Taylor	Recurring role
2018	Mondays	Older Kelly	Episode: "That Time When I Met My Future Self"
2019	Crossword Mysteries: Proposing Murder	Angela	Television film
2021	General Hospital	Chloe Jennings	Recurring role
2023	The Ghost and Molly McGee	Blair (voice)	Episode: "The Unhaunting of Brighton Video"
2025	Haul Out the Halloween	Luna	Television film
2026	Celebrity Weakest Link	Herself	Season 2 Episode: 4 "Fright Night" Fox Television

=== Theatre ===
Year	Title	Role	Playwright	Venue	Ref.
1992	Four Baboons Adoring The Sun	Robin	John Guare	Vivian Beaumont Theater, Broadway	
1994	Show Boat	Children Ensemble / Young Kim Understudy	Jerome Kern / Oscar Hammerstein II	Gershwin Theatre, Broadway	
