= Ready to Run (film) =

- Film poster
- Written by: John Wierick
- Directed by: Duwayne Dunham
- Starring: Krissy Perez; Jason Dohring; Lillian Hurst; Jon Brazier; Nestor Serrano; Theresa Saldana; Paul Rodriguez; Rick Ducommun; Sinbad
- Theme music composer: Phil Marshall
- Country of origin: United States
- Original language: English

Production
- Producer: Margaret Hilliard
- Cinematography: Michael Slovis
- Editor: Don Brochu
- Running time: 96 minutes

Original release
- Network: Disney Channel
- Release: July 14, 2000

Ready to Run is a 2000 American sports drama film that was released as a Disney Channel Original Movie.

== Plot ==
Ready to Run is the story of 14-year-old Corrie Ortiz (Krissy Perez), an energetic girl who dreams of becoming a jockey in the predominantly male sport of Thoroughbred horse racing. Although her father died in a racing-related accident, and her mother is against it, Corrie's spirited memory drives her to try to achieve her goal.

She also has the gift her grandmother calls the "confidence of horses". It allows Corrie to communicate with her horse, Thunder Jam (TJ), who lives dispiritedly in his sire's shadow. Though TJ is an excellent runner, he has an immense fear of the starting gates.

To conquer this fear, the team employs the strange tactic of placing headphones over TJ's ears. Surprisingly, the music works. TJ can now get through the gate with confidence. The headphones later become a trademark of Thunder Jam as he wins more and more races. B. Moody (Jason Dohring), an ex-circus rider, is picked up as the jockey, however, an accident caused by Thunder Jam's competition leaves Moody injured and unable to compete, thus forcing Corrie to step in and take his place.

At the final race of the season their toughest opponent is doing everything he can to see that he wins. He takes it up with the judges that the headphones on TJ's ears are stimulating the horse in some rule breaking manner and should be disallowed.

Dismayed, Corrie and TJ have to run the race without their signature item. After a rough start, Moody ingeniously puts TJ's music over the race course's loud speakers, and TJ, made confident by the familiar song, goes on to win the fictional Gold Rush Derby.

== Cast ==
- Krissy Perez as Corrie Ortiz
- Jason Dohring as B. Moody, Corrie's love interest
- Lillian Hurst as Lourdes Ortiz, Corrie's grandmother
- Jon Brazier as Max Garris
- Nestor Serrano as Hector Machado
- Theresa Saldana as Sonja Ortiz, Corrie's widowed mother
- Paul Rodriguez as Voice of Thunder Jam "T.J."
- Rick Ducommun as Voice of Cyclone
- Sinbad as Voice of Hollywood Shuffle
- Cristian Guerrero as Gabby Ortiz, Corrie's younger brother
- Mark Clare as James McCaffery
- Stephen Tozer as Bob Bethell
- Maggie Harper as Dr. Lucy Huckaby
- Michael Saccente as Homer Flannigan
- John Sumner as Supervisor Pete

== See also ==
- List of films about horses
- List of films about horse racing
