= Peter Wingfield =

Welsh television actor

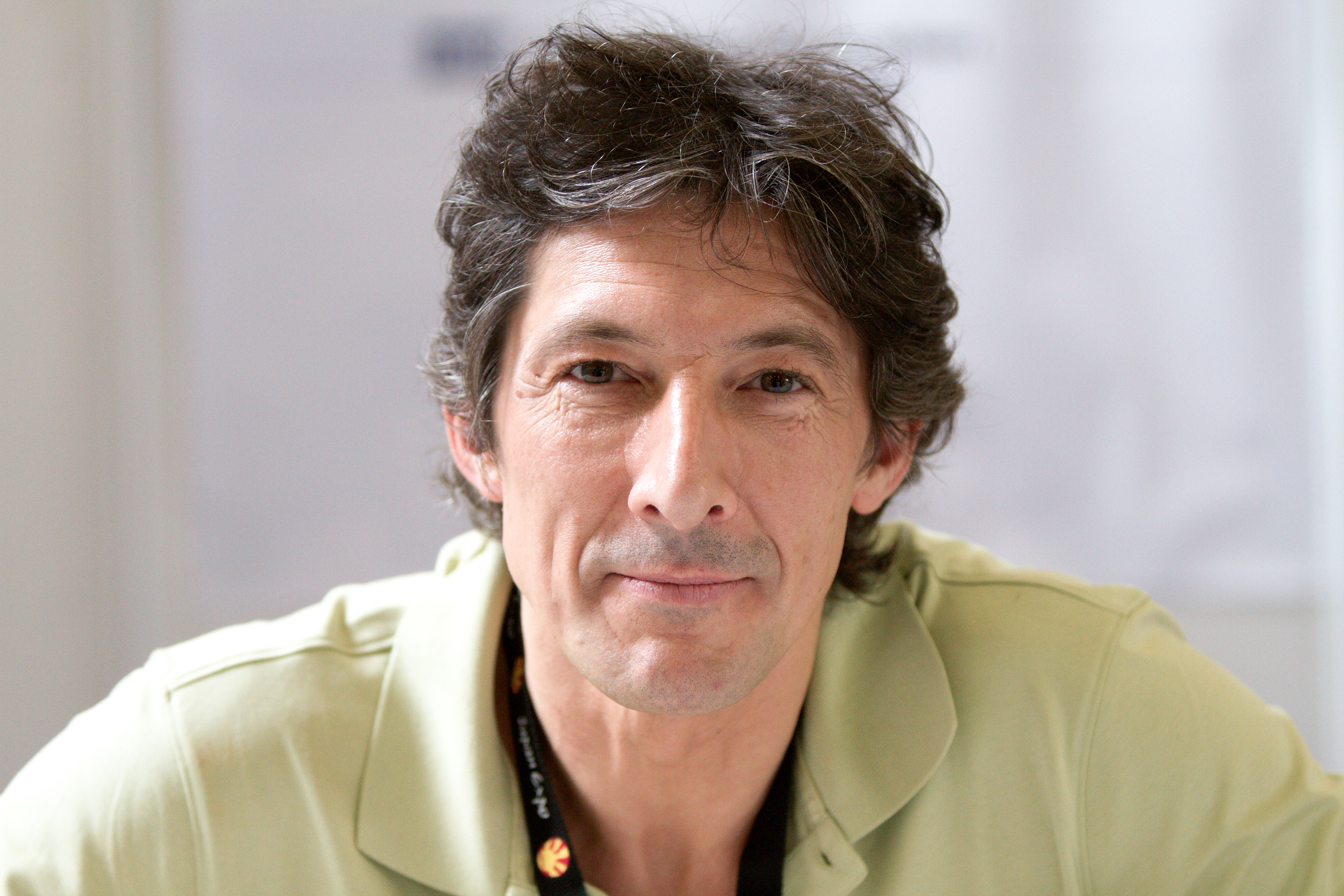
- Peter Wingfield at Japan Expo 2010
- Born: September 5, 1962 (age 63); Cardiff, Wales, United Kingdom
- Education: Brasenose College, Oxford; Medical College of St Bartholomew's Hospital; Guildhall School of Music and Drama; University of Vermont
- Years active: 1990–present
- Website: www.peterwingfield.com

Peter Wingfield (born 5 September 1962) is a British actor and anesthesiologist from Cardiff, Wales. He is known for his television roles, notably as Dan Clifford in the BBC medical drama Holby City, Methos on Highlander: The Series, Dr. Robert Helm on Queen of Swords, Inspector Simon Ross in Cold Squad, and Dr. James Watson on Sanctuary.

Wingfield studied medicine before becoming a successful actor, and later returned to medicine as an anesthesiologist.

== Early life ==
Wingfield was born in Cardiff in 1962. He was educated at The Cathedral School, (Llandaff) in Cardiff. He originally studied medicine at Brasenose College, Oxford and Barts and The London School of Medicine and Dentistry, before taking up acting and graduating from the Guildhall School of Music and Drama.

== Acting career ==
Wingfield has appeared in numerous North American television productions for both Canadian and U.S. companies, including the portrayal of Dr Robert Helm in Queen of Swords filmed in Spain at Texas Hollywood, Almeria, and the surrounding Tabernas Desert. Executive producer, David Abramowitz, met Peter Wingfield at a Highlander convention in November 1999 and offered him the parts of Doctor Helm or Captain Grisham. Wingfield chose the doctor as a part with more mileage and more challenging.

=== Highlander ===
Wingfield played the 5,000-year-old Immortal Methos in the syndicated series Highlander: The Series. While filming the fifth Highlander movie Highlander: The Source, Wingfield related his love for Methos:

And I have to say, the first day of filming was unexpectedly emotional for me. As I put on the long black coat and drove to the set in the pre-dawn gloom, I could feel the presence of an old friend I have not seen for some years now. Really, in a very physical way, I could "feel" him. And I was overwhelmed, possessed even, by the sense of him, tears welling up in my eyes as I formed the words in my head, over and over again, "Methos is alive."

== Medical career ==
Starting in 2011, Wingfield significantly reduced his acting career responsibilities. Returning full circle to his earlier interest in a career in medicine, he entered the College of Medicine at the University of Vermont as part of the Class of 2015. He received his white coat as part of the UVM College of Medicine White Coat Ceremony in 2012. In 2015, it was announced that he would be joining the residency program at the University of California, San Diego. As of September 2020, he is a Board Certified Anesthesiologist at Cedars Sinai in Los Angeles, CA.

== Charitable work ==
Peter is founder and director of Project Edan, a non-profit organization which raises funds for children's charities such as UNICEF and the Boston Children's Hospital. One of Project Edan's focuses is UNICEF's Believe in Zero campaign, which hopes to reduce child mortality.

== Filmography ==
=== Film ===
| Year | Title | Role | Notes |
|---|---|---|---|
| 1994 | Alun Lewis: Death and Beauty | Alun Lewis | |
| 1994 | Degas and Pissarro Fall Out | Phillip | Short film |
| 1994 | Uncovered | Max | |
| 2000 | Highlander: Endgame | Methos | |
| 2003 | X2 | Stryker Soldier Lyman | |
| 2004 | Catwoman | Dr. Ivan Slavicky | |
| 2004 | Superbabies: Baby Geniuses 2 | Crowe | |
| 2005 | The Lazarus Child | Banker | |
| 2005 | Miss Texas | Jack Clooney | |
| 2007 | Highlander: The Source | Methos | |
| 2007 | The Last Sin Eater | The Sin Eater | |
| 2011 | Hamlet | King Claudius | |
| 2011 | JumpRopeSprint | Dan Smullie | |
| 2012 | War of the Worlds: Goliath | Captain Eric Wells (voice) | |
| 2020 | Jumping the Gun | | |

=== Television ===
| Year | Title | Role | Notes |
|---|---|---|---|
| 1990–1991 | The Men's Room | Tom Walton | Miniseries; Episode: "Episode #1.5" |
| 1990 | Screenplay | Taxi Driver | Episode: "Antonia and Jane" |
| 1990–1992 | Medics | Alex Taylor | 10 episodes |
| 1991 | Soldier Soldier | Lieutenant Nick Pasco | 6 episodes |
| 1992 | Screen One | Detective Sergeant Pete Dyson / Paul Greaves | 2 episodes |
| 1992 | Performance | Actor | Episode: "Six Characters in Search of an Author" |
| 1994 | Murder in Mind | Detective Sergeant Pete Dyson | TV movie |
| 1994 | A Very Open Prison | Dominic Casement | TV movie |
| 1994 | The Lifeboat | Rufus Myers Lloyd | Episode: "Troubled Waters" |
| 1994 | Nice Day at the Office | Barry | Episode: "Acting Up" |
| 1994 | Crocodile Shoes | Danny | Miniseries; 4 episodes |
| 1994 | Martin Chuzzlewit | John Westlock | Miniseries; 6 episodes |
| 1995 | Screen Two | Dominic Casement | Episode: "A Very Open Prison" |
| 1995–1998 | Highlander: The Series | Adam Pierson / Methos | 31 episodes |
| 1996 | Into the Fire | Karl | Miniseries; 3 episodes |
| 1996 | Over Here | Tully | Television film |
| 1996 | Murder Most Horrid | Giles | Episode: "A Life or Death Operation" |
| 1997 | Noah's Ark | Tom Kirby | 6 episodes |
| 1998 | The Sentinel | Scott Bruenell | Episode: "Foreign Exchange" |
| 1998 | Viper | Giles Seton | Episode: "About Face" |
| 1998–1999 | Cold Squad | Inspector Simon Ross | 17 episodes |
| 1999 | Strange World | Terrance Shepard | 3 episodes |
| 1999 | Cold Feet | Conrad Gordon | 2 episodes |
| 2000 | The Outer Limits | Dwight Bordon | Episode: "The Beholder" |
| 2000 | The Man Who Used to Be Me | Mark Mason | Television film |
| 2000 | First Wave | Dr. Rook | Episode: "Shadowland" |
| 2000–2001 | Queen of Swords | Dr. Robert Helm | Credited 22 episodes, appeared in 9 episodes plus a flashback episode |
| 2000–2002 | Stargate SG-1 | Tanith / Hebron | 3 episodes |
| 2001 | Night Visions | David Morris | Episode: "The Doghouse/Still Life" |
| 2001 | Halloweentown II: Kalabar's Revenge | Alex | Television film |
| 2001 | The Wedding Dress | Steve Blaine | Television film |
| 2001 | The Miracle of the Cards | Ernie Shergold | Television film |
| 2002 | Edge of Madness | Reverend Walter McBain | Television film |
| 2002 | Just Cause | Brad Ryan | Episode: "Above the Law" |
| 2003 | The Dead Zone | Captain Michael Klein | Episode: "Cabin Pressure" |
| 2003 | John Doe | Ken Rothman | Episode: "Doe or Die" |
| 2002–2004 | Bliss | George / Gerald | 2 episodes |
| 2004 | Andromeda | Lach | Episode: "The Others" |
| 2004 | Touching Evil | Agent Krakauer | 4 episodes |
| 2004 | Kingdom Hospital | Benton Knight | Episode: "Heartless" |
| 2004 | The Shields Stories | Hamish Scott | Miniseries; 6 episodes |
| 2004 | Cooking Lessons | Harry Shipman | Television film |
| 2005 | Smallville | Marcus Becker | Episode: "Lucy" |
| 2006 | The Hunters | James Pantell | Television film |
| 2006 | The Collector | Maurice Jeanrichard | Episode: "The Watchmaker" |
| 2006 | Dalziel and Pascoe | Dave Simmonds | Episode: "Wrong Time, Wrong Place" |
| 2006 | Charmed | Salek | Episode: "The Jung and the Restless" |
| 2006 | Medium | Sean Redburn | Episode: "Twice Upon a Time" |
| 2006–2007 | The L Word | Whit Strobel | 2 episodes |
| 2008 | Men in Trees | Dr. Harbeck | 2 episodes: "Taking the Lead" and "Read Between the Minds" |
| 2009 (filmed in 2008) | 24 | David Emerson | 5 episodes |
| 2006–2009 | Holby City | Dan Clifford | 45 episodes |
| 2010 | 10,000 Days | Remy Farnwell | 12 episodes |
| 2010 | Human Target | Hugh Prentiss | Episode: "Corner Man" |
| 2010 | Riverworld | Richard Burton | Television film |
| 2010 | NCIS: Los Angeles | Eugene Keelson | Episode: "Burned" |
| 2010 | Stonehenge Apocalypse | Dr. John Trousdale | Television film |
| 2010 | Caprica | Global Defense Department Director Gara Singh | 6 episodes |
| 2011 | CSI: Miami | Paul Nichols | Episode: "Match Made in Hell" |
| 2011 | Endgame | Oleg Olesky | Episode: ""Huxley, We Have a Problem" |
| 2011 | Alphas | James Collier | Episode: "Bill and Gary's Excellent Adventure" |
| 2008–2011 | Sanctuary | Dr. James Watson | 5 episodes |
| 2014 | 10,000 Days | Remy Farnwell | Television film |
| 2016 | Beauty & the Beast | Beast Hunter | Episode: "Monsieur et Madame Bete" |

=== Video games ===
| Year | Title | Role |
|---|---|---|
| 2008 | Highlander: The Game | Methos |
| 2023 | The Talos Principle 2 | Byron |
