= Judith Hoag =

American actress (born 1963)

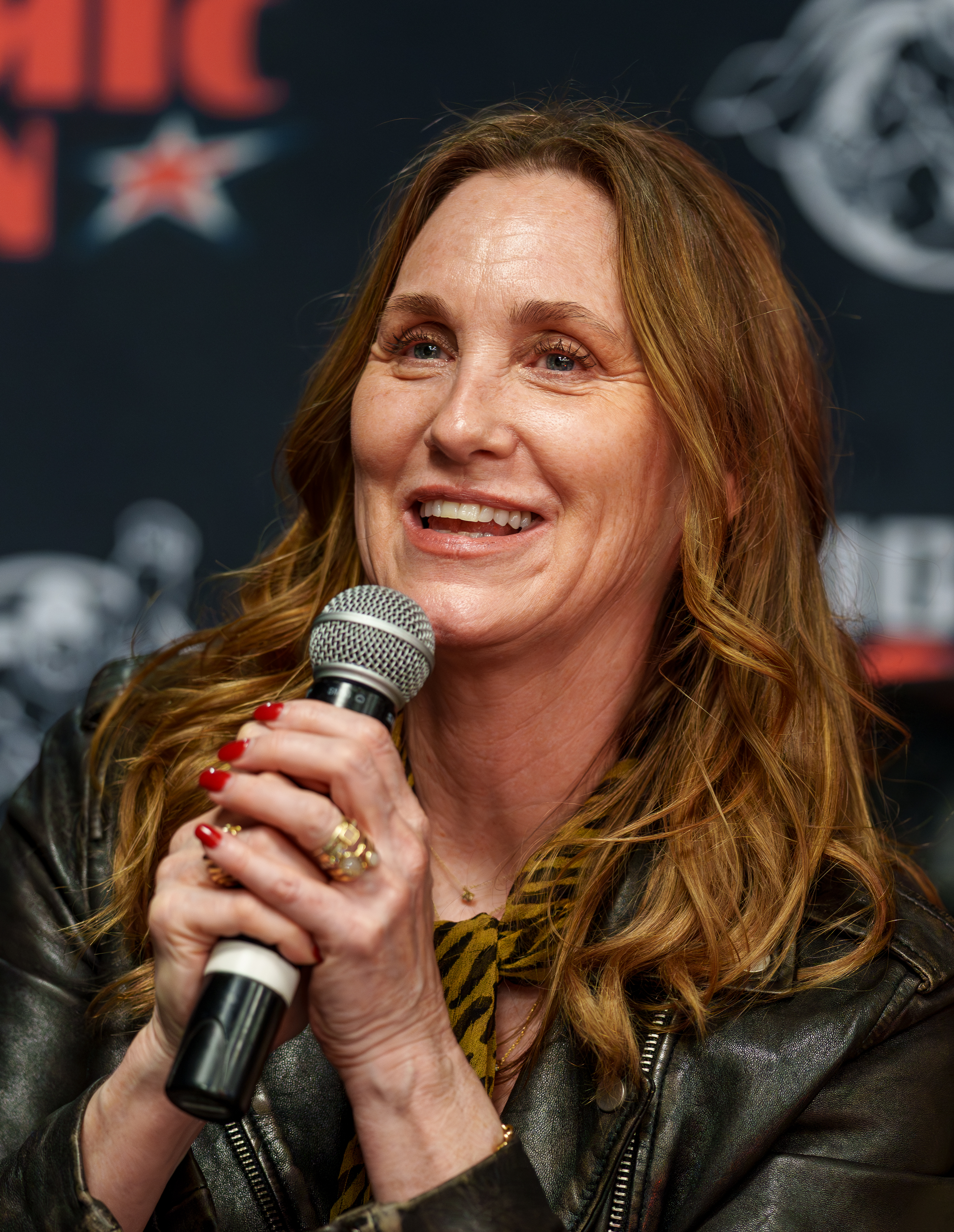
- Hoag at Big Lick Comic Con in Roanoke, Virginia in 2026
- Born: June 29, 1963 (age 63); Newburyport, Massachusetts, U.S.
- Occupation: Actress
- Years active: 1986–present
- Spouses: Vince Grant (m. 1988; div. 2016) Phillip Stone (m. 2021)
- Children: 2

Judith Hoag (/hoʊɡ/; born June 29, 1963) is an American actress. She is known for playing April O'Neil in Teenage Mutant Ninja Turtles (1990) and Gwen Cromwell Piper in the Disney Channel television film series Halloweentown, from 1998 to 2006.

Hoag is also known for her recurring roles as Cindy Dutton Price in the HBO drama series Big Love (2006–2011), Tandy Hampton in the ABC musical drama series Nashville (2012–2018), and Stephanie Quinn in the Syfy fantasy drama series The Magicians (2016–2020).

== Early life ==
Hoag was born in Newburyport, Massachusetts. As a teen, Hoag attended Walnut Hill School in Natick, Massachusetts, where she concentrated on acting. She graduated in 1981.

== Career ==
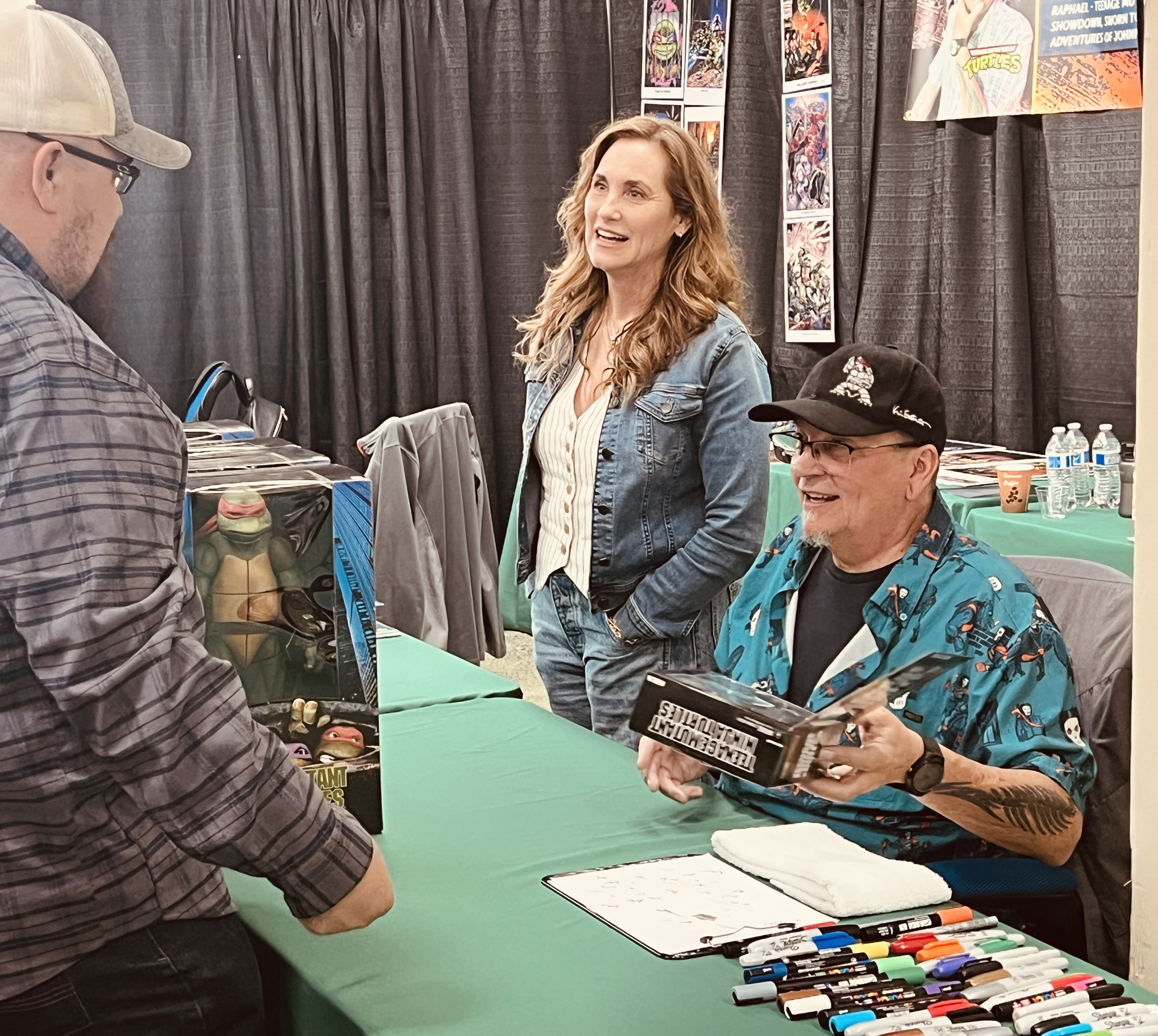
Judith Hoag and TMNT creator Kevin Eastman talk to a fan at a convention in Washington state on June 22, 2025.

Hoag has acted professionally since 1986. That year, she got one of her first roles as a series regular in the ABC daytime soap opera Loving; she played the role of Charlotte 'Lotty' Bates Alden. After leaving Loving in 1988, Hoag began her career in primetime television, and in next year won female lead role on CBS comedy series Wolf. The series was canceled after a single season. In 1990, she starred in films A Matter of Degrees and Cadillac Man.

Hoag is most well known for her role as April O'Neil in the first Teenage Mutant Ninja Turtles film. The film turned out to be a huge success at the box office, eventually making over $135 million in North America, and over $66 million outside North America, for a worldwide total of over $200 million, making it the ninth highest-grossing film of 1990 worldwide. After Teenage Mutant Ninja Turtles fame, Hoag starred in a number of pilots not picked up as a series, and appeared in several television films, including Fine Things by Danielle Steel, and Switched at Birth opposite Bonnie Bedelia.

Hoag received further recognition as Gwen Cromwell Piper in the Disney Channel Halloweentown franchise, appearing in Halloweentown (1998), Halloweentown II: Kalabar's Revenge (2001), Halloweentown High (2004) and Return to Halloweentown (2006). In a 2020 Galaxy Con question-and-answer panel, Hoag revealed she had a meeting with the head of Walt Disney Television where she read for the part and got cast in the role after it was revealed that the head's son was a die-hard Ninja Turtle fan as Hoag had previously played April O'Neil in 1990's Teenage Mutant Ninja Turtles.

She also appeared in the films Armageddon (1998), Flying By (2009), I Am Number Four (2011) and Hitchcock (2012), and has made over 60 guest appearances on television shows, including Quantum Leap, Melrose Place, Roseanne, The Nanny, Murder, She Wrote, Chicago Hope, The X-Files, Six Feet Under, Ghost Whisperer, NYPD Blue, Grey's Anatomy, Private Practice, CSI: NY, Criminal Minds, Sons of Anarchy, Castle, The Middle, Grimm and among other notable television series.

From 2006 to 2011, Hoag also appeared as Cindy Price on the HBO drama series Big Love.

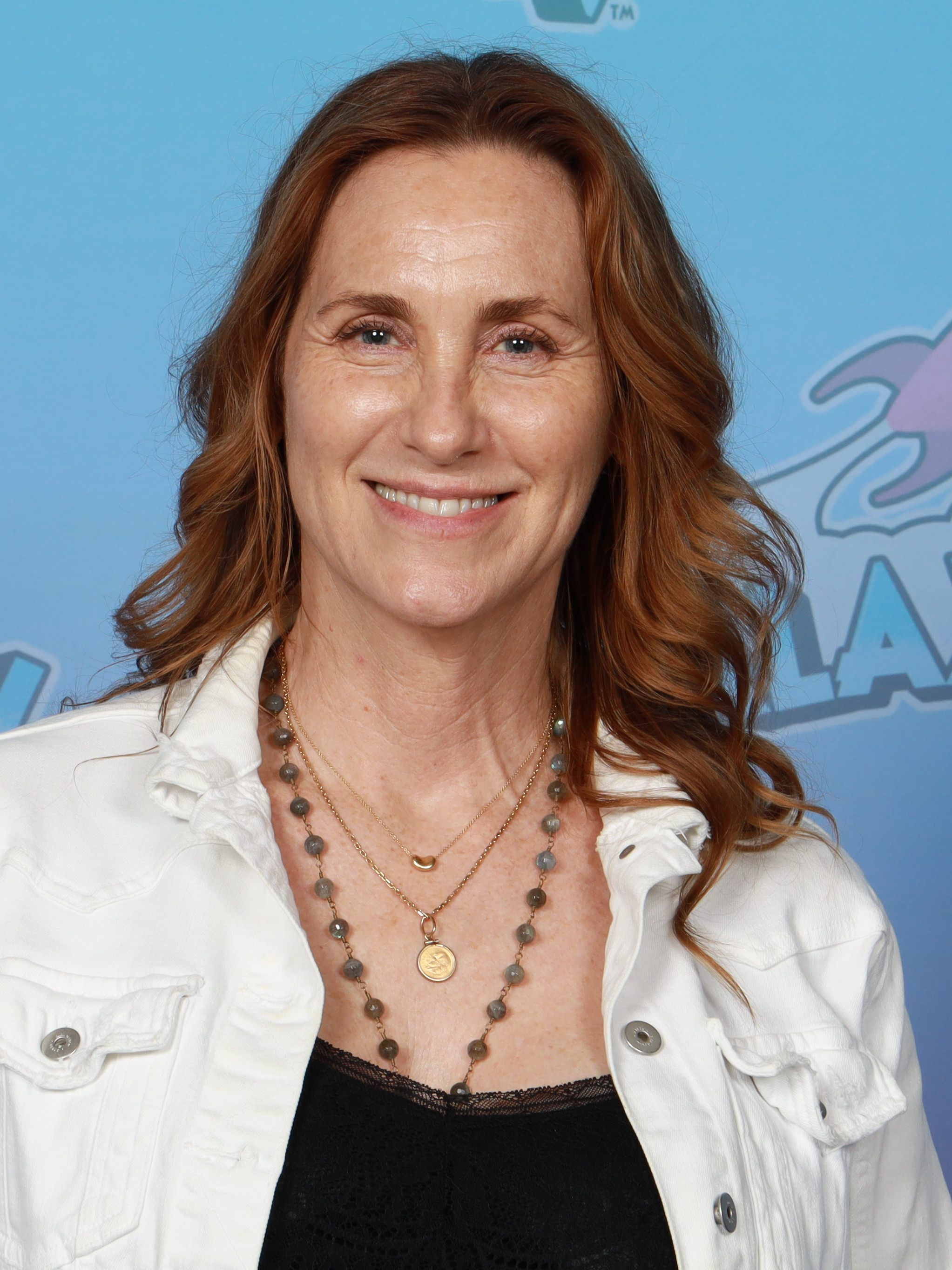
Hoag at GalaxyCon Raleigh in 2024.

In 2012, Hoag was cast in a recurring role in the ABC drama series Nashville created by Academy Award winner Callie Khouri. She plays the poised and driven Tandy Hampton, daughter and protégé of Lamar Wyatt. She referees sister Rayna (Connie Britton) and Lamar's (Powers Boothe) contentious relationship, trying to calm the waters. She appeared total in 40 episodes, include almost every episode during the first two seasons.

In 2015, Hoag filmed a cameo for the 2016 film Teenage Mutant Ninja Turtles: Out of the Shadows, but the scene with her was cut from the final film. Her scene later appeared in the film's home media release.

From 2016 to 2020, Hoag appeared in a recurring role as Alice's (Olivia Taylor Dudley) mother in the Syfy fantasy series The Magicians, and played a supporting role in the 2018 romantic drama film Forever My Girl.

== Personal life ==
In 1988, she married actor Vince Grant. They have two children, a son and a daughter. The couple divorced in 2016. On February 13, 2021, she married Phillip Stone.

== Filmography ==
=== Film ===
Year	Title	Role	Notes
1990	A Matter of Degrees	Kate Blum	
1990	Teenage Mutant Ninja Turtles	April O'Neil	
1990	Cadillac Man	Molly	
1997	Here Dies Another Day	Charlotte	
1998	Armageddon	Denise Chappel	
1999	Bad City Blues	Callilou Carter	
2006	Salt	Rebecca	
2009	Flying By	Vicki	
2010	A Nightmare on Elm Street	Doctor	Uncredited
2011	Wish Wizard	Mrs. Casey	
2011	I Am Number Four	Sarah's Mom	
2012	Hitchcock	Lillian	
2013	Bad Words	Petal Dubois	
2014	Destroyer	Debbie	Short film
2016	Teenage Mutant Ninja Turtles: Out of the Shadows	Rita	Cameo; Scenes deleted
2017	Fishbowl	Macy	
2017	DC Noir	Mary Sullivan	
2018	Forever My Girl	Dr. Whitman	
2021	Finding You	Jennifer Sinclair	
2023	Roll with It	Ruby	

=== Television ===
Year	Title	Role	Notes
1986	American Playhouse	Kevin's Friend	Episode: "The Little Sister"
1986–1987	Loving	Charlotte 'Lotty' Bates Alden	Unknown episodes
1988	Spenser: For Hire	Eileen Kingsley	Episode: "Skeletons in the Closet"
1989	CBS Summer Playhouse	—N/a	Episode: "Elysian Fields"
1989–1990	Wolf	Melissa Shaw Elliott	11 episodes
1990	The Young Riders	Ellen	Episode: "The Littlest Cowboy"
1990	The Knife and Gun Club	Dr. Annie Falk	Television film
1990	Fine Things	Molly	Television film
1991	Switched at Birth	Barbara Mays	Television film
1991	Murder in High Places	Meg Faithorn	Television film
1991	Lenny	Megan	Episode: "My Boyfriend's Black and There Gonna Be Trouble"
1992	Quantum Leap	Julie Miller	Episode: "Nowhere to Run - August 10, 1968"
1992	Roseanne	Kerry	Episode: "Looking for Loans in All the Wrong Places"
1992	Melrose Place	Sarah Goldstein	2 episodes
1992	Murder, She Wrote	Gretchen Price	Episode: "Programmed for Murder"
1993	The Adventures of Brisco County, Jr.	Iphigenia Poole	Episode: "Socrates' Sister"
1993	Walker, Texas Ranger	Lainie Flanders	Episode: "Family Matters"
1993	Acting on Impulse	Gail Black	Television film
1994	Dream On	Pamela	Episode: "Hey, Nanny Nanny"
1994	The Nanny	Katherine Porter / Kathy Marie O'Malley	Episode: "Material Fran"
1994	Murder, She Wrote	Nancy Godfrey	Episode: "To Kill a Legend"
1994	Hardball	Barbara	Episode: "My Name Is Hard B."
1994	Mad About You	Doris	Episode: "The Ride Home"
1995	Sweet Justice	Cory Shaw	Episode: "Baby Mine"
1995	A Mother's Gift	Sarah Lutz	Television film
1997	The Burning Zone	Dr. Meredith Schrager	2 episodes
1997	Beyond Belief: Fact or Fiction	—N/a	Episode: "From the Agency"
1997	Nash Bridges	Dr. Gabrielle	Episode: "One Flew Over the Cuda's Nest"
1997	Nothing Sacred	Judy	2 episodes
1997	Breast Men	Valerie	Television film
1998	Pensacola: Wings of Gold	Maureen Hunt	Episode: "We Are Not Alone"
1998	Soldier of Fortune, Inc.	Claire Broderick	Episode: "Payback"
1998	Halloweentown	Gwen Cromwell Piper	Television film
1998–2000	The Pretender	Captain Angela Wiley	2 episodes
1999	Strange World	Regina Tyler	Episode: "Down Came the Rain"
1999	Providence	Susan Marcus	Episode: "Pig in Providence"
1999	Chicago Hope	Tina Hofmeister	Episode: "Kiss of Death"
1999	The X-Files	Dr. Mindy Rinehart	Episode: "Hungry"
2000	Touched by an Angel	Janet	Episode: "A House Divided"
2001	Judging Amy	Bonnie Manning	Episode: "Redheaded Stepchild"
2001	Halloweentown II: Kalabar's Revenge	Gwen Cromwell Piper	Television film
2002	Boston Public	Beth Thomas	Episode: "Chapter Thirty-Five"
2002	Six Feet Under	Dawn	Episode: "Out, Out, Brief Candle"
2002	ER	Mrs. Brenner	Episode: "Next of Kin"
2003	Without a Trace	Carol Miller	Episode: "Maple Street"
2003	Crossing Jordan	Alice Ross	Episode: "Conspiracy"
2003	Carnivàle	Miss Jolene	Episode: "Black Blizzard"
2003	The Guardian	Ria Lewicki	Episode: "Hazel Park"
2004	CSI: Crime Scene Investigation	Merill Maguire	Episode: "Getting Off"
2004	Century City	—N/a	Episode: "Love and Games"
2004	7th Heaven	Mrs. Johnson	Episode: "High and Dry"
2004	NYPD Blue	Paige Matheson	Episode: "I Love My Wives, But Oh You Kid"
2004	Halloweentown High	Gwen Cromwell Piper	Television film
2005	JAG	Mildred Evans	Episode: "Fair Winds and Following Seas"
2005	Close to Home	Terry the Madam	Episode: "Suburban Prostitution"
2006	Commander in Chief	Syndi Saltzman	Episode: "Wind Beneath My Wing"
2006	Bones	Helen Granger	Episode: "The Superhero in the Alley"
2006	Still Standing	Melanie Goldman	Episode: "Still Graduating"
2006	Ghost Whisperer	Angela Morrison	Episode: "Drowned Lives"
2006	Return to Halloweentown	Gwen Cromwell Piper	Television film
2006–2011	Big Love	Cindy Dutton Price	13 episodes
2007	Grey's Anatomy	Rhada Douglas	2 episodes
2007	Notes from the Underbelly	Mrs. Cole	Episode: "Keeping Up Appearances"
2007	Final Approach	Marie Gilford	Television film
2007	Women's Murder Club	Dr. Raine Van Aiken	Episode: "Welcome to the Club"
2008	Girlfriends	Alison	Episode: "Adapt to Adopt"
2008	Swingtown	Rita Pierce	Episode: "Friends with Benefits"
2008	Sons of Anarchy	Karen Oswald	Episode: "Fun Town"
2008	The Mentalist	Sandra Boatwright	Episode: "Red Hair and Silver Tape"
2009	The Forgotten	Charlotte Dent	Episode: "Diamond Jane"
2010	CSI: NY	Mrs. Reynolds	Episode: "Criminal Justice"
2010	Private Practice	Angie McConnell	3 episodes
2010	Weeds	Dana	Episode: "Fran Tarkenton"
2011	The Defenders	Courtney Noland	Episode: "Noland v. Galloway Pharmaceuticals"
2011	Off the Map	Margie Packard	Episode: "There's a Lot to Miss About the Jungle"
2011	In Plain Sight	Sharon Harris	Episode: "Meet the Shannons"
2011	Castle	Mrs. Hamilton	Episode: "Head Case"
2011	Grimm	Mrs. Jessup	Episode: "Danse Macabre"
2011	The Craigslist Killer	Patricia Banks	Television film
2012	Criminal Minds	Diana Mitchell	Episode: "Unknown Subject"
2012	The Middle	Mrs. Jennings	Episode: "Get Your Business Done"
2012	Happily Divorced	Donna	Episode: "Swimmers and Losers"
2012	Sexting in Suburbia	Patricia Reid	Television film
2012–2018	Nashville	Tandy Hampton	41 episodes
2016–2020	The Magicians	Stephanie Quinn	5 episodes
