= Joey Zimmerman =

American actor (born 1986)

- Born: Joseph Paul Zimmerman; June 10, 1986 (age 40); Albuquerque, New Mexico, U.S.
- Other name: J. Paul Zimmerman
- Occupations: Actor; director; producer
- Years active: 1992–present
- Spouse: Becky Zimmerman (m. 2020)

Joseph Paul Zimmerman (born June 10, 1986) is an American actor known for his role as Dylan Piper in Halloweentown franchise.

== Early life ==
Zimmerman was born in Albuquerque, New Mexico, to Kat and Harry Zimmerman, a Los Alamos–based actor. His parents divorced and he lived with his father. As a toddler, he moved to San Diego, California. He is Jewish.

== Career ==
Despite Zimmerman generally being recognized for his acting, he has since moved behind the camera. Today, he focuses more on being a creator, producer, writer, and director. He most often works with ZFO Entertainment, which he co-created in 2014, focusing on science fiction projects.

In recent years, Zimmerman has also done more stage acting and directing as well, such as directing The Dark Heart of Poe at Fire Hall Theatre in 2023.

== Personal life ==
At one point, Zimmerman was in a relationship with actress/musician Aria Noelle Curzon. In 2020, he privately married Becky Zimmerman.

Aside from film and television, Zimmerman is also passionate about photography, and regularly shares his photos online.

== Filmography ==
Joey Zimmerman's screen credits include the following.

- Jack Reed: Badge of Honor (1993)
- Murder Between Friends (1994) as Boy
- Mother's Boys (1994)
- Earth 2 (1994—1995) (TV series)
- Beastmaster III: The Eye of Braxus (1996) as Pir (TV movie)
- Bailey Kipper's P.O.V. (1996) (TV series)
- Halloweentown (1998) as Dylan Piper (TV movie)
- Caroline in the City (1998) as Chuckie (one episode)
- Felicity (1999) as Matthew Anderson (one episode)
- Treehouse Hostage (1999) as Timmy Taylor
- The Practice (2002) as Steven Jamison (two episodes)
- Becker (2000) (TV Series) as Jeff (high school student)
- 7th Heaven (2000) as Luke (two episodes)
- Halloweentown II: Kalabar's Revenge (2001) as Dylan Piper (TV movie)
- That '70s Show (2002) (Steven Hyde; age 13) (two episodes)
- Halloweentown High (2004) as Dylan Piper (TV movie)
- Dogg's Hamlet, Cahoot's Macbeth (2005) - Director
- Return to Halloweentown (2006) as Dylan Piper (TV movie)
- In Plain Sight (2010) as Stranger #2
- Roswell FM (2012) as Chris
