= Robin Thomas =

American actor

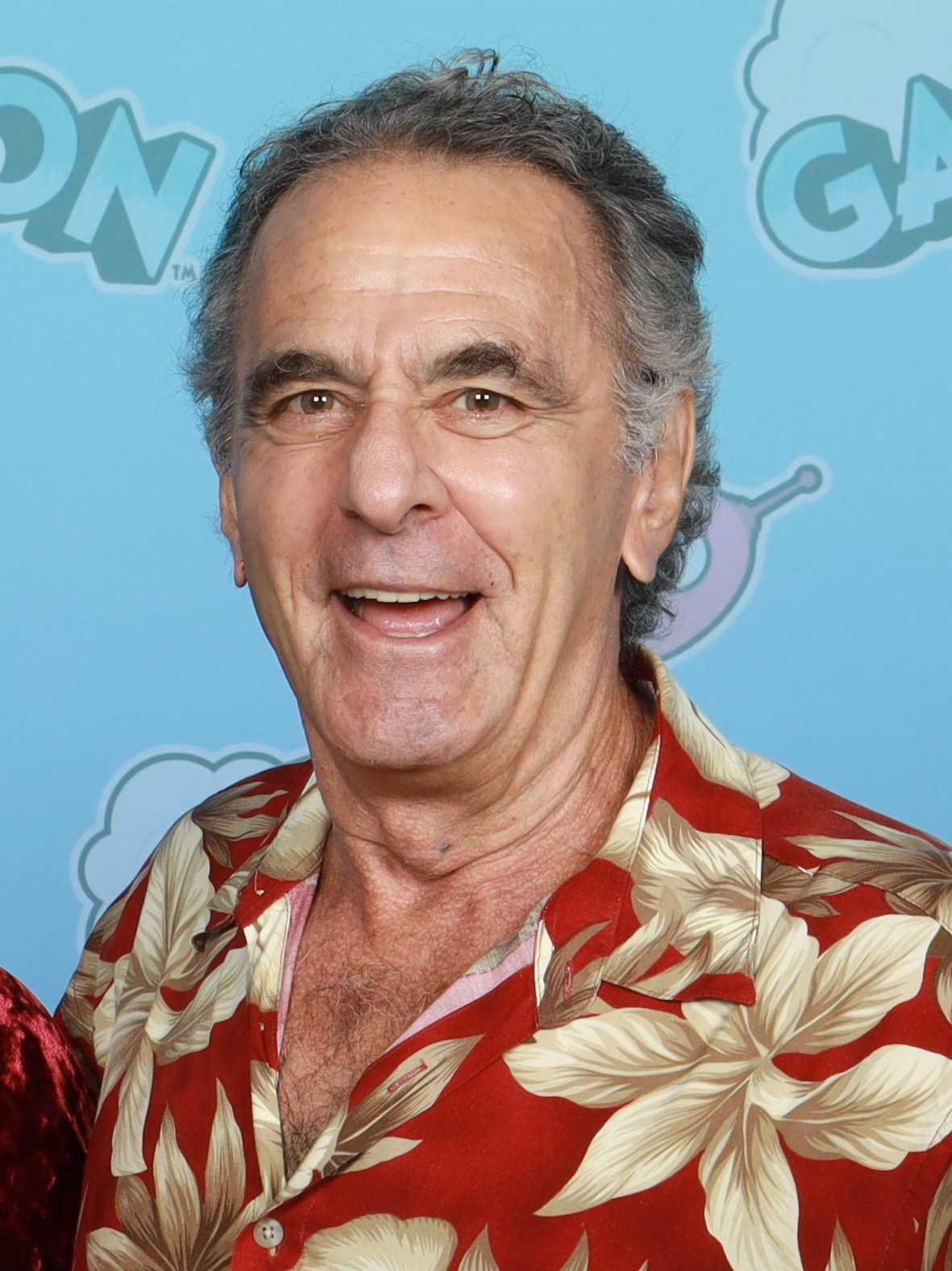
- Thomas at Superstar Comic Con Savannah in 2025
- Occupations: Actor, sculptor
- Years active: 1982–present
- Spouse: Gina I. Wishnick (m. 1983; div. 2007)
- Children: 2

Robin Thomas is an American film, television and theater actor, and sculptor, best known for his role as Kalabar in the seminal Disney Channel Original Movie Halloweentown.

== Career ==
Thomas' best-known television roles are as Mark Singleton on Another World (1983–85), and as Geoffrey Wells on Who's the Boss?. He also portrayed Paul Kellogg on The Mommies, Nate's father on Life Unexpected, and had recurring roles on the television series Murphy Brown, Hunter, Matlock, Thirtysomething, Baby Boom, The Division, Switched at Birth, and 90210.

He has also appeared on Misfits of Science, Midnight Caller, Party of Five, Walker, Texas Ranger, Pacific Blue, Queer as Folk, NCIS, NCIS: Los Angeles, CSI: Crime Scene Investigation, CSI: Miami, CSI: NY, Criminal Minds, Desperate Housewives, Franklin & Bash, Castle, Manhattan, Fuller House, Transparent, Blue Bloods, and Crazy Ex-Girlfriend, among others.

He also appeared in such films as About Last Night..., Summer School, The Contender, The Banger Sisters, Pacific Rim, and Seberg.

From February to March 2009, he appeared as Richard in the Donald Margulies play Time Stands Still at the Geffen Playhouse. He was replaced in the role by Eric Bogosian when the show transferred to Broadway in 2010.

From 2019 to 2021, he starred as Graham Winslow in the Mystery 101 series of TV movies for the Hallmark Channel as part of its Hallmark Movies & Mysteries series.

== Personal life ==
Thomas spent his early years in New York as a carpenter, specializing in renovations of restaurants and apartments.

== Filmography ==
=== Film ===
Year	Title	Role	Notes
1986	About Last Night	Steve Carlson	
1987	Summer School	Vice Principal Phil Gills	
1990	Welcome Home, Roxy Carmichael	Scotty Sandholtzer	
1993	Me and the Kid	Dr. Berman	
1995	Jade	Mr. Green	
1995	Chameleon	Jason Ainsley	
1996	Amityville Dollhouse	Bill Martin	
1997	Star Maps	Martin	
1998	Bulworth	Reporter in Hallway	
1998	Break Up	Doctor	
2000	More Dogs Than Bones	Tim Thomas	
2000	The Contender	William Hanson	
2002	Clockstoppers	Dr. George Gibbs	
2002	The Banger Sisters	Raymond Kingsley	
2003	Missing Brendan	Bob Calden	
2005	Ambulance Girl		
2007	Cougar Club	Mr. Holmes	
2009	The Pool Boys	Mr. Stenson	
2010	Bones	Detective	
2010	The Space Between	Airline Executive	
2012	A Green Story	Michael Henry	
2013	Pacific Rim	American UN Representative	
2015	Babysitter	Neal Longway	
2016	Frontman	Doctor Glass	Short
2016	Dreamland	Allen	
2018	Con Man	Mr. Fitzgerald	
2018	The Assassin's Code	Angelo Leonetti	
2018	Delirium	Mr. Walker	
2019	Seberg	Interviewer	

=== Television ===
Year	Title	Role	Notes
1982	As the World Turns	Dr. Matt Butler	
1983	Svengali	Mendy Weindenbaum	TV movie
1983–1985	Another World	Mark Singleton	series regular
1985	Misfits of Science	Vincent	Episode: "Grand Theft Bunny"
1986	Cagney & Lacey	Eric Webber	Episode: "Exit Stage Center"
1986	The Magical World of Disney	Dr. Gardner	Episode: "A Fighting Choice"
1986	Fame	Mr. Torrence	Episode: "The Incident"
1986–1987	Who's the Boss?	Geoffrey Wells	6 episodes
1987	My Sister Sam	Matt	Episode: "Sister, Can You Spare a Fifty?"
1987	Matlock	Prosecutor Burton Hawkins	6 episodes
1987	Mr. President	Justin	3 episodes
1987	Haunted by Her Past	Charles Kamen	TV movie
1987	A Year in the Life	Brian	Episode: "Dixie Chicken"
1987	Free Spirit		TV movie
1988	Thirtysomething	Dr. Bob Kramer	2 episodes
1988	Who Gets the Friends?	Paul Keaton	TV movie
1988	Baby Boom	Rob Marks	2 episodes
1989	From the Dead of Night	Glen Eastman	TV movie
1989	Anything but Love	Jack Hansen	Episode: "Burning the Toad"
1990	Island Son		Episode: "Mary, Mary Quite Contrary"
1990	Personals	Evan Martin	TV movie
1990	Memories of Murder	Michael	TV movie
1990	Father Dowling Mysteries	Jonathan Cabot	Episode: "The Legacy Mystery"
1990	Midnight Caller	Stan Jessick	Episode: "Home to Roost"
1990	Close Encounters	David Albird	TV movie
1991	Hunter	Det. Al Novak / Mr. Canova	2 episodes
1991	Empty Nest	Will	Episode: "Her Cheatin' Heart"
1991	The Rape of Doctor Willis	Wally Shaw	TV movie
1991	Murder, She Wrote	Gerald Innsmouth	Episode: "The Committee"
1992	Citizen Cohn	Reporter	TV movie
1992	Freshman Dorm	Professor Beckenstein	3 episodes
1993	For the Love of My Child: The Anissa Ayala Story	Dr. Rudolph Brutoco	TV movie
1993	Without Warning: Terror in the Towers		TV movie
1993–1994	The Mommies	Paul Kellogg	24 episodes
1994	Touched by an Angel	Dr. Harrison Trowbridge Archibald IV	Episode: "Manny"
1995	An Element of Truth	Peter	TV movie
1995–1996	Party of Five	Mr. Marshall Thompson	3 episodes
1988–1996	Murphy Brown	Jake Lowenstein	5 episodes
1996	High Incident		Episode: "Women & Children First"
1996	Color Me Perfect	Dr. Mitch Conlon	TV movie
1997	JAG	Phil Delaney	Episode: "Ghosts"
1997	High Stakes	Mike	TV movie
1998	Pacific Blue	Professor Alan Watson	Episode: "Glass Houses"
1998	To Have & to Hold	Jack Cornell	Episode: "Stuck in the Blizzard with You"
1998	Halloweentown	Kalabar	TV movie
1998	V.I.P.	Gower Jantzen	Episode: "Vallery of the Dolls"
1998	Mortal Kombat: Conquest	Shinnok	Antagonist Role
1999	Walker, Texas Ranger	Brian Whitman	Episode: "Mind Games"
1999	Chicago Hope	Priest	Episode: "Team Play"
1999	Horse Sense	Glenn Woods	TV movie
2000	Diagnosis: Murder	Dr. Donald Ward	Episode: "Teacher's Pet"
2001	It's Like, You Know...	Producer	Episode: "The Quick and the Dead"
2001	Halloweentown II: Kalabar's Revenge	Kalabar	(TV; via footage from "Halloweentown")
2002	The West Wing	Sen. Jack Enlow, D-IL	Episode: "Dead Irish Writers"
2002	The Court	Andrew Loesch	5 episodes
2002	The Pennsylvania Miners' Story	Governor Mark Schweiker	TV movie
1997–2002	The Practice	Dr. Stephen Barrett / Harry Duvall / Robert Adler	3 episodes
2003	CSI: Miami	Bret Betancourt	Episode: "Dead Zone"
2003	The Street Lawyer	Rudolph Mayes	TV movie
2004	Queer as Folk	Sam Auerbach	5 episodes
2002–2004	The Division	Louis Perillo	11 episodes
2004	Law & Order	Connecticut Governor Michael Riordan	Episode: "Gov Love"
2004	North Shore	Mr. Jensen	Episode: "Illusions"
2004	House	Dan's Father	Episode: "Paternity"
2004	Gramercy Park	Billy Hammond Sr.	TV movie
2005	Kevin Hill	Harlan Davis	Episode: "A River in Egypt"
2005	CSI: NY	Abel Bloom	Episode: "Til Death Do We Part"
2005	Jane Doe: Now You See It, Now You Don't	William Joyner	TV movie
2005	Blind Justice	Haden Eastman	Episode: "Under the Gun"
2005	Ambulance Girl	Michael Stern	TV movie
2005	Just Legal	Dr. Steven Benson	Episode: "The Limit"
2005	Criminal Minds	Evan Davenport	Episode: "Broken Mirror"
2006	Without a Trace	Michael Fletcher	Episode: "The Little Things"
2006	Cold Case	Roger Felice	Episode: "Baby Blues"
2007	CSI: Crime Scene Investigation	Bill Dorton	Episode: "Meet Market"
2007	The Closer	Michael Morgan	Episode: "Saving Face"
2007	Damages	Martin Cutler	3 episodes
2007	Women's Murder Club	Philip Davenport	Episode: "Train in Vain"
2007	NCIS	Dr. Neil Fleming	Episode: "Leap of Faith"
2007	Shark	Evan Kendall	Episode: "Every Breath You Take"
2008	Moonlight	Robert Fordham	Episode: "What's Left Behind"
2008	Bones	Richard King	Episode: "The Bone That Blew"
2008	Eleventh Hour	Dr. Tom Carraway	Episode: "Flesh"
2009	24	Deputy Attorney General	Episode: "Day 7: 6:00 a.m.-7:00 a.m."
2009	Raising the Bar	Gordon Burke	Episode: "I'll Be Down to Get You in a Taxi, Honey"
2009	The Storm		Episode: "The Storm, Part 2"
2009	Desperate Housewives	Dick Jackson	Episode: "Never Judge a Lady by Her Lover"
2009	Castle	Alan Freeman	Episode: "Vampire Weekend"
2010	Nip/Tuck	Les Overmyer	Episode: "Sheila Carlton"
2010–2011	Life Unexpected	Jack Bazile	8 episodes
2011	Law & Order: LA	Marty Fox	Episode: "Benedict Canyon"
2011	Franklin & Bash	Big Mack	Episode: "Jennifer of Troy"
2011	NCIS: Los Angeles	Dennis White	Episode: "Lone Wolf"
2011–2012	Switched at Birth	Dale	3 episodes
2012	Rizzoli & Isles	Roger Deluth	Episode: "No More Drama in My Life"
2011–2013	90210	Charles Sanderson	2 episodes
2013	Cleaners	Barry Madden	6 episodes
2014	Manhattan	Maxwell Rubins	Episode: "The Second Coming"
2014	Runaway	Rick	TV movie
2016	Fuller House	Dr. Fred Harmon	2 episodes
2016	StartUp	Leonard	3 episodes
2016–2017	Zoo	Max Morgan	6 episodes
2017	Dracula Goes to Camp	Barry Cohen	TV movie
2017	Transparent	Dr. Crichton	Episode: "Born Again"
2017	Law & Order True Crime	David Conn	2 episodes
2018	Blue Bloods	Dr. Max McCandless	Episode: "Thicker Than Water"
2018	Lethal Weapon	Victor Halderman	Episode: "Get the Picture"
2015–2019	Crazy Ex-Girlfriend	Marco Serrano	6 episodes
2019	Mystery 101	Graham Winslow	Hallmark Movies & Mysteries TV movie
2019	Mystery 101: Playing Dead	Graham Winslow	Hallmark Movies & Mysteries TV movie
2019	Mystery 101: Words Can Kill	Graham Winslow	Hallmark Movies & Mysteries TV movie
2019	Mystery 101: Dead Talk	Graham Winslow	Hallmark Movies & Mysteries TV movie
2020	Mystery 101: An Education in Murder	Graham Winslow	Hallmark Movies & Mysteries TV movie
2021	Mystery 101: Killer Timing	Graham Winslow	Hallmark Movies & Mysteries TV movie
2021	Mystery 101: Deadly History	Graham Winslow	Hallmark Movies & Mysteries TV movie
