= Return to Halloweentown =

2006 television film by David Jackson

- Promotional poster
- Based on: Characters by Paul Bernbaum and Jon Cooksey & Ali Matheson
- Written by: Max Enscoe; Annie DeYoung; Juliet Giglio; Keith Giglio
- Directed by: David Jackson
- Starring: Sara Paxton; Judith Hoag; Lucas Grabeel; Joey Zimmerman; Kristy Wu; Keone Young; Debbie Reynolds
- Music by: Kenneth Burgomaster
- Country of origin: United States
- Original language: English

Production
- Producers: Don Schain; Sheri Singer
- Cinematography: Denis Maloney
- Editor: Mike Grant
- Running time: 87 minutes
- Production companies: Just Singer Entertainment; Salty Pictures

Original release
- Network: Disney Channel
- Release: October 20, 2006

Related
- Halloweentown; Halloweentown II: Kalabar's Revenge; Halloweentown High

Return to Halloweentown (also known as Halloweentown 4) is a 2006 American fantasy comedy film released as a Disney Channel Original Movie that premiered on October 20, 2006, and is the fourth film in the Halloweentown series. The story follows Marnie Piper (Sara Paxton) going to college at Witch University in Halloweentown, where dark forces try to control her magic.

This is the only film in the Halloweentown series not to feature Kimberly J. Brown as Marnie, although Joey Zimmerman, Debbie Reynolds, Judith Hoag, and Lucas Grabeel reprise their roles. Sophie Piper, played by Emily Roeske in the previous films, is mentioned but does not appear. This film also marks the first Disney Channel Original Movie franchise to produce a fourth installment. The premiere scored 7.5 million viewers.

== Plot ==
One year after the events of the last film, a now eighteen-year-old Marnie is offered a full scholarship to Halloweentown's Witch University, headed by its chancellor Luxana Goodwyn, for her good deeds and help in the previous years. Much to her mother Gwen's dismay, Marnie decides to forgo her original college plans and instead attends the Halloweentown school. Gwen forces Marnie's brother Dylan to accompany and keep an eye on her. The school is not what it seems, as witches and warlocks cannot use magic; instead their curriculum seems to be no different than a mortal college curriculum: Shakespeare analysis, with old magic history. Marnie had thought she would learn how to use her magic and is now crestfallen.

Marnie runs into her old friend Ethan and makes a new friend named Aneesa the Genie. She also makes three new enemies in the Sinister Sisters: Scarlett, Sage and Sapphire, a triad of malevolent, extremely snobby, spoiled, and manipulative witches who are the daughters of Silas Sinister and with whom Dylan is immediately infatuated. Marnie learns that she is responsible for the university's restriction of magic. The university was originally established exclusively for warlocks and witches to learn how to use magic, but when the portal between Halloweentown and the human world was opened permanently instead of just on Halloween, most of them went to college in the mortal realm. Since then, Witch University has allowed other magical creatures to attend. Magic was banned on campus grounds to level the academic playing field, but the Sinister Sisters still use theirs discreetly. The classes are boring for Marnie until during one class with Dr. Ichabod Grogg, she uncovers within the dungeon of the college, a box, with the name "S. Cromwell" inscribed on it, magically appearing in front of her, but the box is locked and has no key with it.

Marnie meets with one of her professors, Miss Periwinkle, and asks for an explanation. Periwinkle only tells Marnie that the S. stands for Splendora and that she and her were very good friends. Marnie and Dylan learn that the box contains the Gift, a magical power only a Cromwell can use, which Splendora locked in the box centuries ago. Meanwhile, the Sinister sisters use Dylan's infatuation with them to make him do their homework and use as bait for Marnie. Later, Ethan tells Marnie about a mysterious group, his father was part of, known as the Dominion that will try to use Marnie to open the box and use the Gift to take over Halloweentown and turn everyone into their permanent slaves, and Goodwyn and Grogg are part of them, but Marnie does not believe him. Marnie later travels to the past to meet Splendora and learn about the true nature of the enigmatic gift. Splendora explains that the Gift is an amulet that bestows the wearer with the power to control anyone, a power that witches are forbidden to use, and its power can tempt a good witch to turn bad. Marnie realizes that Ethan was right about the Dominion and Splendora bestows upon her the key to the box containing the Gift. Splendora is revealed to be Marnie's grandmother Aggie Cromwell. Agatha is her middle name and she hates the Splendora part so she eventually dropped it. Marnie returns to the present with the key to open the box.

Dr. Goodwyn steals the Gift for the Dominion and the Sinisters to take over Halloweentown. Knowing that only a Cromwell can use the Gift, the Sinister Sisters transform Dylan into a Border Collie to compel Marnie to comply with their demands. If Dylan is not turned back by midnight, he will stay that way forever. They agree to return him to his natural form if Marnie controls Halloweentown for them. Marnie falsely agrees to aid them in their plot, initially using the Gift to control the people at Witch University, but she turns on them once she has Aneesa trap the Gift in her lamp. With the Gift trapped in the lamp, Marnie, Dylan, Gwen, and Aneesa destroy the lamp, which destroys the Gift. The Dominion attempt an escape, but are apprehended by Periwinkle who is revealed to have been undercover for ten centuries as a detective of the Halloweentown Anti-Dominion League. She imprisons them in a Witch's Glass where she has stripped them of their magic and arrested them for treason.

The malevolent Sinister Sisters lose their powers as well, but Marnie learns that Ethan willingly gave his powers up after his father was found guilty in the previous film. Marnie and Ethan begin a new relationship and leave on a date, as Marnie secretly reveals to Gwen she did not really destroy the gift, but instead gave it to someone she trusts absolutely. The film ends when Dylan finds Marnie left the Gift for him in a book that he was reading; since spells cast on the grounds of Witch University become permanent at midnight, the Gift belongs to him, as he is the only person Marnie trusts with its power. Saving the power of the Gift for important uses only, he puts the book away, and it shows a glowing red S at the end of the film.

== Cast ==
- Sara Paxton as Marnie Piper
- Judith Hoag as Gwen Piper, Marnie's widowed mother
- Lucas Grabeel as Ethan Dalloway, Marnie's third love interest
- Joey Zimmerman as Dylan Piper, Marnie's younger brother
- Kristy Wu as Scarlett Sinister, Silas's first daughter
- Keone Young as Silas Sinister, the head of the Sinister Inc. and the leader of the Dominion
- Millicent Martin as Priscilla Periwinkle, the professor of Witch University
  - Brighton Hertford as Young Priscilla Periwinkle
- Leslie Wing-Pomeroy as Dr. Lwaxana Goodwin, the chancellor of Witch University and the member of the Dominion
- Debbie Reynolds as Splendora "Aggie" Cromwell, Marnie's maternal grandmother
  - Sara Paxton as Young Aggie Cromwell
- Summer Bishil as Aneesa, Marnie's roommate
- Katie Cockrell as Sage Sinister, Silas's second daughter and Sapphire's identical twin sister
- Kellie Cockrell as Sapphire Sinister, Silas's third daughter and Sage's identical twin sister
- Scott Stevenson as Dr. Ichabod Grogg, the professor of Witch University and the member of the Dominion
- Christopher Robin Miller as Burp-Urp-Snurt-Pfsfsfsfst III, Ethan's roommate
- Steve Andruzzi as Snooty

== Production ==
In a 2017 interview with E!, producer Sheri Singer said the recasting of Marnie "was not something we wanted to do. We could not come to terms that we felt were fair. We just weren't able to. We couldn't make the deal work. That was why [Kimberly J. Brown was recast] and we didn't want to not do it. I know people didn't like it, but it's not like people haven't been recast before. I always was sorry that's how it went".

In 2018, Kimberly J. Brown stated in a question and answer session that she was available and ready to do the film, but Disney decided to go in a different direction and recast the role.

In 2024, Singer further explained that Brown and her team came to contract negotiations with a list of "unusual perks", saying that "she wanted a rich deal. It wasn't acrimonious, but I think she wanted her mother to get a shot at writing the story, or getting a producer credit. Had limits on what publicity she would, or wouldn't do. What she wanted to get paid. There were just some things that, at least at the time, felt overreaching, and she didn't budge".

Gary Marsh wanted a fourth Halloweentown film, with or without Kimberly J. Brown.

=== Writing ===
The production pursued two different script ideas, one of which would have been a musical featuring music written by Jim Wise.

== Score ==
Kenneth Burgomaster, who composed, orchestrated, and conducted the soundtrack for the film, uploaded the full score to his YouTube channel in October 2020.

No.	Title	Length
1.	"Opening: Silas' Message"	1:19
2.	"Mail Invitation"	0:31
3.	"Hologram Message"	0:31
4.	"Off to the University"	2:43
5.	"Silas Sinister"	1:27
6.	"Sinister Girls: Professor Crog"	1:01
7.	"Aggie's Warning"	1:15
8.	"Aneesa"	1:29
9.	"Professor Crog's Class"	1:45
10.	"Archaeology Class"	1:25
11.	"Skull to Magic Box"	1:09
12.	"Sinister Reading Prophesy"	1:57
13.	"Marnie Can't Open the Box"	1:39
14.	"Marnie Gets the Lowdown"	1:49
15.	"The Library"	0:55
16.	"Dylan Speed Reads"	0:37
17.	"Sinister Dis"	0:35
18.	"Pondering Box"	1:55
19.	"Make Me"	0:40
20.	"Broom Goes Wrong"	0:39
21.	"Back to the Love"	0:29
22.	"The Scroll"	1:20
23.	"Marnie on a Quest"	1:29
24.	"Ancient Halloweentown"	1:10
25.	"Queen Fanfare"	1:08
26.	"Marnie Escapes"	1:02
27.	"Splendora"	1:55
28.	"Silence!"	0:31
29.	"Are You Aggie Cromwell?"	1:39
30.	"Chancellor Steals Amulet"	1:24
31.	"Chasing Dylan Dog"	1:31
32.	"Marnie Sets Off"	0:46
33.	"Queen Fanfare - Trumpets"	0:27
34.	"Amulet Destroyed"	4:16
35.	"More Love"	1:43
36.	"Amulet in the Book - The End"	0:38
Total length:		47:00

== Release ==
Return to Halloweentown premiered on Disney Channel on October 20, 2006. The DVD was released on August 28, 2007. It was made available to stream on Disney+. In 2018, Disney made the film available for streaming on Disney Channel's YouTube channel through a live broadcast.

== Reception ==
=== Critical response ===
Alyssa Ray of E! Online initially disliked Return to Halloweentown upon its premiere in 2006, particularly due to the recasting of the lead role, but after rewatching the film 15 years later, Ray was pleasantly surprised by its appeal. Despite the lead actress change, they appreciated the numerous callbacks to the earlier films, including appearances by familiar characters. Ray highlighted the film's standout features, including the character Scarlett as a memorable millennial antagonist and Marnie's fashion, which accurately reflected mid-2000s trends. The college setting and updated special effects, including CGI elements and creative time-travel plotlines, were also complimented. Ultimately, Ray acknowledged Return to Halloweentown as one of the best entries in the franchise. Maya Ogolini of BuzzFeed deemed Return to Halloweentown to be a worthy addition to a Halloween movie marathon, highlighting its blend of mystery and the engaging storyline of Marnie, citing the character battling evil forces and exploring an ancient family prophecy while attending Witch University. On the negative side, Ogolini expressed disappointment over the reduced presence of Debbie Reynolds and the recasting of Marnie, saying it caused some confusion for fans. Despite these critiques, Ogolini found the film to be as a satisfying conclusion to the Halloweentown series.

Sierra Filucci of Common Sense Media gave Return to Halloweentown a score of three out of five stars and noted the depiction of positive messages in the film. Filucci stated that the main character tend to break rules for good causes while evil characters end up with a punishment. Furthermore, Filucci took notice of the diversity among the cast. Reagan Thornley of Her Campus asserted that the plot of Return to Halloweentown is well-constructed and features engaging Halloweentown elements. They noted that the film still holds value for its intriguing aspects and would remain worth watching, but Thornley remarked that the recasting of Marnie significantly impacted their perception of the film. They noted that, had the original actress retained her role, the film might have been received better.

==== Criticism ====
The film received heavy criticism for not casting original lead actress Kimberly J. Brown as Marnie, despite her being available for the shoot. Stacey Grant of MTV said everyone should pretend Return to Halloweentown never happened, due to the recasting. Sabienna Bowman of Bustle referred to the recasting of Brown as a "terrible mistake". Andrew LaSane of Business Insider noted that several reviewers stated they wished to see Brown come back to portray Marnie in the film. According to Sheri Singer, executive producer of the Halloweentown series, Disney and Kimberly J. Brown's representatives were unable to reach an agreement for Brown's return.

=== Ratings ===
The premiere of Return to Halloweentown was seen by a total of over 7.5 million viewers in the United States making it the most-watched basic cable program of the day, and making it the fourth highest-rated Disney Channel Movie at the time of its airing.

=== Accolades ===
Return to Halloweentown was nominated for Television Movie or Mini-Series at the 2007 ADG Excellence in Production Design Awards. It was nominated for Outstanding Art Direction for a Miniseries or Movie at the 59th Primetime Creative Arts Emmy Awards.

== Sequel ==
In 2017, producer Sheri Singer expressed interest in doing a fifth film, but needed Disney to sign off. Actress Kimberly J. Brown previously expressed interest on reprising her role as Marnie Piper should a fifth film ever materialize. In a 2020 interview with E!, Phillip Van Dyke expressed interest in returning for another film if the rest of the cast also returned. In October 2026, a fifth film was announced to be in development for Disney Channel and Disney+.

== See also ==
- List of films set around Halloween
- Halloweentown (1998)
- Halloweentown II: Kalabar's Revenge (2001)
- Halloweentown High (2004)
