= Halloweentown High =

2004 television film by Mark A.Z. Dippé

- DVD cover
- Based on: Characters by Paul Bernbaum and Jon Cooksey & Ali Matheson
- Written by: Dan Berendsen
- Directed by: Mark A.Z. Dippé
- Starring: Kimberly J. Brown; Judith Hoag; Joey Zimmerman; Emily Roeske; Clifton Davis; Debbie Reynolds
- Theme music composer: Kenneth Burgomaster
- Country of origin: United States
- Original language: English

Production
- Producer: Don Schain
- Cinematography: Bob Seaman
- Editor: Terry Blythe
- Running time: 82 minutes
- Production company: Just Singer Entertainment

Original release
- Network: Disney Channel
- Release: October 8, 2004

Related
- Halloweentown; Halloweentown II: Kalabar's Revenge; Return to Halloweentown

Halloweentown High (also known as Halloweentown 3) is a 2004 American fantasy comedy film released as a Disney Channel Original Movie that premiered on Disney Channel on October 8, 2004. It is the third installment in the Halloweentown series. It stars Kimberly J. Brown, Debbie Reynolds, Judith Hoag, and Joey Zimmerman. In the film, Marnie persuades the Halloweentown Council to allow magical students to attend a mortal school, but risks losing her family's powers if something goes wrong before midnight on Halloween. The film attracted over 6 million viewers during its premiere.

== Plot ==
Two years after the previous film, Marnie Piper prepares to begin a new school year named Callwood High School. She asks the Halloweentown Council to work toward openness between Halloweentown and the mortal world. She proposes bringing a group of Halloweentown students to her own high school in the mortal world. The council is initially apprehensive, mostly due to the legend of the Knights of the Iron Dagger, a fanatical order of knights who wanted to destroy all things magical. The council, however, agrees to accept the plan after Marnie mistakenly bets "all the Cromwell magic" that her plan will work. If she does not prove she is right by midnight on Halloween, then her entire family will lose their magical abilities. Marnie, regretting what she said to the council, wants to cancel the program she has made, but her grandmother Aggie Cromwell opposes, saying that they have nothing to fear.

The Halloweentown students arrive and are magically given human appearances to disguise their true non-human natures. School begins with Marnie acting as a tour guide for the exchange group, claiming they are from Canada. Aggie substitute teaches so she can be available in case of need. Cody, a new student, shows a romantic interest in Marnie.

While Aggie proves unable to teach any subject effectively, the Halloweentown students keep to themselves, hiding in the refuge that Aggie magically creates for them in a remote student locker. Marnie gradually encourages the students to join sports teams, school activities, and to make new friends.

Marnie's progress is interrupted by a warning that appears to be from the Knights of the Iron Dagger, then by a magical incident at the mall that results in the Halloweentown students assuming their natural appearances in public. This is followed by a break-in at the secret magical locker and Cassie's disappearance.

Meanwhile, Marnie's developing relationship with Cody parallels an unexpected romance beginning between Aggie and the school's principal Phil Flanagan. Aggie suspects Cody of being the cause of the trouble and tries to convince Marnie to halt their relationship, but Marnie in turn suspects Flanagan. They eventually discover that Flanagan is the Knight in question; he was told prior to the students' arrival that he was the last of the Order.

Edgar Dalloway, head of the Witches' Council and father of one of the students, is the real root of their problems. He wants to keep Halloweentown isolated from the mortal world, and used Flanagan to ensure that Marnie's project fails. This, he hoped, would cause a negative reaction in Halloweentown and keep the portal between Halloweentown and the mortal world closed.

The Halloweentown students use the school's Halloween carnival to improve mortal attitudes toward magical folk. Their haunted house depicts the ordinary lives of creatures that have typically been seen as monsters in the mortal world, including displays like the "Monster Tea Party" and ogres "picnicking in their natural setting", which winds up boring the carnival goers. Meanwhile, Marnie's mother Gwen uses a Witch's Glass to hunt down Cassie.

At the school carnival, Dalloway launches magical attacks against the mortal students by bringing the inanimate monsters in the haunted house to life. The ensuing panic spirals beyond Marnie's and Aggie's ability to contain the monsters. Flanagan incites a mob to corner the Halloweentown students. Cody tames the crowd, the students reveal themselves, and the crowd accepts them for who they are. Flanagan also renounces being a knight and accepts Aggie.

Dalloway claims the Cromwell magic and explains that his son Ethan helped with most of the things that happened, but Gwen has shown the evening's events to the Halloweentown High Council. They return the Cromwell magic, Gwen returns with the imprisoned student, and the Council imprisons Dalloway in another Witch's Glass, taking his disagreement with them as a form of resignation and taking the families magic.

The portal between Halloweentown and the mortal world opens inside the haunted house, and crowds of children from Halloweentown cross over to enjoy the carnival together with children of the mortal world. Marnie flies off for a romantic broom ride with Cody. While flying over the carnival, they kiss.

== Cast ==
- Kimberly J. Brown as Marnie Piper
- Debbie Reynolds as Aggie Cromwell, Marnie's maternal grandmother
- Judith Hoag as Gwen Piper, Marnie's widowed mother
- Joey Zimmerman as Dylan Piper, Marnie's younger brother
- Emily Roeske as Sophie Piper, Marnie's younger sister
- Clifton Davis as Principal Phil Flanagan, Aggie's love interest and the principal of Callwood High School
- Finn Wittrock as Cody Trainer, Marnie's second love interest
- Michael Flynn as Edgar Dalloway, the judge of Halloweentown Council
- Eliana Reyes as Cassie, Aggie's student
- Lucas Grabeel as Ethan Dalloway, Edgar's son and Aggie's student
- Olesya Rulin as Natalie, Aggie's student and Dylan's love interest
- Todd Michael as Pete, Aggie's student
- Jesse Harward as Chester, Aggie's student
- Jeff Olson as a six-armed man of Halloweentown Council
- Frank Gerrish as pumpkinhead of Halloweentown Council
- Mowava Pryor as vampire of Halloweentown Council
- Aaron Justesen as mummy of Halloweentown Council
- Frank Welker as voice of Aggie's pet lizard-like briefase

== Production ==
Kimberly J. Brown was more involved in the storyline of Halloweentown High and provided some input into the script to ensure continuity across the films. Some of the scenes of Halloweentown High were filmed at the Juan Diego Catholic High School in Utah.

== Release ==
Halloweentown High premiered on Disney Channel on October 8, 2004. It was made available to stream on Disney+.

In 2018, Disney made the film available for streaming on Disney Channel's YouTube channel through a live broadcast.

== Reception ==
=== Critical response ===
Chelsea Candelario of PureWow described Halloweentown High as a crowd-pleaser. They noted that, although the film spends limited time in Halloweentown, the portrayal of Marnie navigating high school proves engaging. Moreover, Candelario highlighted the late Debbie Reynolds' contribution as a notable enhancement to the film. Blakesley Rhett of Her Campus said that Halloweentown High might be their favorite Halloween film of all time, praising its engaging mix of characters, family drama, relationships, witches, and a magical high school. They appreciated the film's combination of cheesy high school elements with supernatural themes, noting that it felt tailor-made for their tastes. Rhett complimented how the film immerses viewers in the plot, and highlighted the film's appeal through its diverse range of monsters, from trolls to fairies, and how they interact with the human world. Rhett concluded that Halloweentown High is a fun and entertaining Halloween film with valuable social commentary.

Anna Govert of Paste named Halloweentown High one of the best Disney Channel Halloween films and stated that the film maintains the charm of its predecessors in the franchise, reiterating the theme that the world benefits from celebrating both the differences and similarities, and learning to live together in harmony. S. Jhoanna Robledo of Common Sense Media gave Halloweentown High a score of three out of five stars and said that while the overall message of the film is heartwarming—emphasizing that characters should be more alike than different and should strive to get along—the film does include humor at the expense of Canadians, suggesting a degree of naivete. Furthermore, Robledo remarked that while tweens are unlikely to be frightened by the somewhat rudimentary special effects, younger children might find them unsettling.

=== Ratings ===
Halloweentown High drew 6.1 million viewers for its premiere.

== Sequel ==
Halloweentown High was followed by the sequel Return to Halloweentown in 2006.

== See also ==
- List of films set around Halloween
- Halloweentown (1998)
- Halloweentown II: Kalabar's Revenge (2001)
- Return to Halloweentown (2006)
