= Duwayne Dunham =

American film director

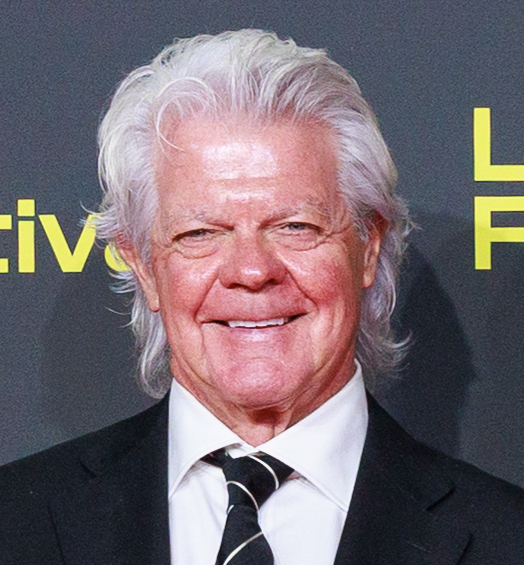
- Dunham in 2025
- Born: Duwayne Robert Dunham; November 17, 1952 (age 73); Los Angeles, California, U.S.
- Occupations: Film director Television director Film editor Academic
- Known for: Return of the Jedi; Blue Velvet; Twin Peaks; Halloweentown; Homeward Bound: The Incredible Journey
- Title: Adjunct Professor at USC School of Cinematic Arts
- Spouse: Janet Louise Young (m. 1983)
- Children: 2

Duwayne Robert Dunham (born November 17, 1952) is an American director and editor of film and television, as well as an adjunct professor at the USC School of Cinematic Arts. He is best known for his collaborations with George Lucas and David Lynch, serving as editor on Return of the Jedi and Blue Velvet. After being hired for Lynch's series Twin Peaks, he was promoted to director and made his debut with the second episode of the series. He subsequently directed the films Homeward Bound: The Incredible Journey and Little Giants, and numerous television films for the Disney Channel including Halloweentown, The Thirteenth Year, Ready to Run, Right on Track, and Tiger Cruise. In 2018, he reunited with Lynch to edit all 18 episodes of the Twin Peaks: The Return revival series.

During the 1978 San Anselmo Country Fair in San Anselmo, California, Dunham became the first person to portray Star Wars bounty hunter Boba Fett in the character's public debut. Dunham had previously filmed a screen test of the Boba Fett costume.

For his work on Twin Peaks, Dunham won a Primetime Emmy Award in 1990.

== Filmography ==
=== Film ===
| Year | Title | Editor | Director | Writer | Notes |
|---|---|---|---|---|---|
| 1977 | Three Warriors | Assist. | | | Edited by Bonnie Koehler |
| 1977 | Star Wars | Assist. | | | Edited by Paul Hirsch, Richard Chew & Marcia Lucas |
| 1979 | Apocalypse Now | Assist. | | | Edited by Richard Marks, Gerald B. Greenberg, Lisa Fruchtman & Walter Murch |
| 1979 | More American Graffiti | Yes | | | Co-edited by Tina Hirsch |
| 1979 | The Black Stallion | Assist. | | | Edited by Robert Dalva |
| 1980 | The Empire Strikes Back | Assist. | | | Edited by Paul Hirsch |
| 1981 | Raiders of the Lost Ark | Assist. | | | Edited by Michael Kahn |
| 1981 | Dragonslayer | Assist. | | | Edited by Tony Lawson |
| 1983 | Return of the Jedi | Yes | | | Co-editor with Sean Barton & Marcia Lucas |
| 1985 | The Mean Season | Yes | | | |
| 1986 | Blue Velvet | Yes | | | 1st collaboration with David Lynch |
| 1987 | Throw Momma from the Train | Addtl. | | | Edited by Michael Jablow |
| 1988 | Cherry 2000 | Yes | | | Co-editor with Edward M. Abroms |
| 1988 | Fright Night Part 2 | Addtl. | | | Edited by Jay Cassidy |
| 1989 | Bill & Ted's Excellent Adventure | Addtl. | | | Edited by Larry Bock & Patrick Rand |
| 1990 | Wild at Heart | Yes | | | |
| 1993 | Homeward Bound: The Incredible Journey | Yes | Yes | | Directorial Debut |
| 1994 | Little Giants | | Yes | | |
| 2011 | K-11 | Yes | | | |
| 2011 | That First Glide | Yes | Yes | Yes | Documentary film Co-director with Mike Waltze |
| 2017 | Spreading Darkness | Yes | | | Co-editor with Josh Eisenstadt & Mathias Hilger |
| 2020 | The Turning | Yes | | | |
| 2025 | Legend of the Happy Worker | Yes | Yes | Yes | |

=== Television ===
| Year | Title | Editor | Director | Notes |
|---|---|---|---|---|
| 1990-91 | Twin Peaks | Yes | Yes | Editor - 2 episodes Director - 3 episodes Primetime Emmy Award for Outstanding Single-Camera Picture Editing for a Drama Series |
| 1995-97 | JAG | | Yes | 2 episodes |
| 1996 | 7th Heaven | | Yes | 2 episodes |
| 1998 | Halloweentown | Yes | Yes | Television film |
| 1998 | Beyond Belief: Fact or Fiction | | Yes | 7 episodes |
| 1999 | The Thirteenth Year | | Yes | Television film |
| 1999 | Santa and Pete | | Yes | Television film |
| 2000 | Ready to Run | | Yes | Television film |
| 2002 | Double Teamed | | Yes | Television film |
| 2003 | Right on Track | | Yes | Television film |
| 2004 | Tiger Cruise | | Yes | Television film Nominated- Directors Guild of America Award for Outstanding Directing – Children's Programs |
| 2005 | Now You See It... | | Yes | Television film |
| 2010-11 | Star Wars: The Clone Wars | | Yes | 2 episodes |
| 2017 | Twin Peaks: The Return | Yes | | 18 episodes Nominated- Primetime Emmy Award for Outstanding Single-Camera Picture Editing for a Limited Series |
