= Halloweentown (film) =

1998 television film by Duwayne Dunham

- Promotional poster
- Genre: Fantasy; Comedy; Family film
- Teleplay by: Paul Bernbaum; Jon Cooksey; Ali Marie Matheson
- Story by: Paul Bernbaum
- Directed by: Duwayne Dunham
- Starring: Debbie Reynolds; Judith Hoag; Kimberly J. Brown; Joey Zimmerman; Phillip Van Dyke; Emily Roeske; Robin Thomas
- Composer: Mark Mothersbaugh
- Country of origin: United States
- Original language: English

Production
- Producer: Ron Mitchell
- Cinematography: Michael Slovis
- Editor: Martin Nicholson
- Running time: 84 minutes
- Production company: Singer-White Entertainment
- Budget: $4 million

Original release
- Network: Disney Channel
- Release: October 17, 1998

Related
- Halloweentown II: Kalabar's Revenge; Halloweentown High; Return to Halloweentown

Halloweentown is a 1998 American fantasy comedy television film directed by Duwayne Dunham and written by Paul Bernbaum, Jon Cooksey, and Ali Marie Matheson, from a story by Bernbaum. The first installment in the Halloweentown series, it stars Debbie Reynolds, Judith Hoag, Kimberly J. Brown, Joey Zimmerman, Phillip Van Dyke, Emily Roeske, and Robin Thomas. It is the fourth Disney Channel Original Movie. The film premiered on Disney Channel on October 17, 1998. It centers on Marnie, who learns she is a witch on her 13th Halloween and is transported to Halloweentown—a magical place where ghosts, ghouls, witches, and werewolves live apart from the mortal world, but she soon finds herself battling wicked warlocks, evil curses, and endless surprises.

== Plot ==
Thirteen-year-old Marnie Piper is fascinated by everything related to Halloween, but for unspecified reasons, her widowed mother Gwen forbids her and her two younger siblings Dylan and Sophie from going out for trick-or-treating. Gwen's mother Aggie Cromwell arrives for her annual Halloween visit. Aggie and Gwen are secretly witches, but while Aggie encourages the children to celebrate Halloween, Gwen is determined to live a normal life as a mortal.

Aggie reads the children a bedtime story called "Halloweentown", about a magical place inhabited by witches, vampires, werewolves, and other creatures. Marnie overhears Aggie telling Gwen that Marnie must begin her witch training before her 13th Halloween, or else her powers will be lost forever, but Gwen insists that Marnie be raised as a mortal, like her father was. Aggie also asks Gwen for help, saying that citizens of Halloweentown have been disappearing, but Gwen refuses.

When Aggie leaves to return home, Marnie and Dylan covertly follow her. They see Aggie boarding a magical bus, sneak onto it, and arrive in Halloweentown, discovering the town is real. Upon arrival, Marnie and Dylan realize that Sophie had snuck onto the bus with them. The three meet Kalabar, the mayor of Halloweentown, who puts them in a taxi to their grandmother's mansion. Aggie tells the children about a hooded demon that is plotting to take over Halloweentown. To defeat the demon, she intends to activate Merlin's talisman with a spell and potion.

Failing to light the talisman with "instant" potion, Aggie takes the children to town for ingredients. The family encounter Luke, a goblin who was turned into a handsome teenage boy by a "shadow creature". He makes a clumsy pass at Marnie, which she rebuffs. Gwen arrives in Halloweentown to retrieve the children, to Marnie's objections. Unable to find another bus back to the mortal world, Gwen is surprised to find that the mayor is Kalabar, an ex-boyfriend of hers. Luke tells Aggie that the demon wants Merlin's talisman, and takes her to him. Gwen and her children follow Aggie and Luke to an abandoned movie theater.

In the movie theater, Aggie finds that some of the Halloweentown citizens have been frozen in time. The hooded demon appears, and Aggie refuses to give him the talisman. Gwen and the children enter the theater as Luke flees in fear. The demon freezes Gwen and Aggie. Marnie, Dylan, and Sophie escape and collect the necessary ingredients—the hair of a werewolf, the sweat of a ghost, and a vampire's fang—to make the potion that will activate the talisman and unfreeze the others. They realize they must place the talisman in the giant jack-o'-lantern in the town square to defeat the demon.

When they arrive to install it, the demon appears and reveals himself to be Kalabar, who tries to persuade the townspeople to join him in taking over the mortal world. With Luke's help, Marnie climbs onto the jack-o'-lantern and attempts to place the talisman inside, but Kalabar casts a spell to freeze her. As she is about to pass out, Marnie drops the talisman inside the jack-o'-lantern, which causes it to illuminate. This unfreezes Marnie and everyone trapped inside the theater, and weakens Kalabar.

The children are reunited with their mother and grandmother, who also learn that Kalabar is the demon. He is bitter that Gwen chose to marry a mortal man instead of him. He obtains the talisman and announces his plan to become the ruler of both the mortal and magical world. Realizing that he has magical powers of his own, Dylan joins Gwen, Aggie, and his sisters in defeating Kalabar, who is vaporized before Aggie retrieves the talisman. Luke is restored to his goblin appearance, though Marnie kisses him on the cheek.

Aggie decides to stay in the mortal world for a while to spend more time with her grandchildren, and Gwen agrees to complete Marnie's witch training. They board the bus and blast off back into the mortal world.

== Cast ==
- Debbie Reynolds as Aggie Cromwell
- Judith Hoag as Gwen Piper, Aggie's daughter
- Kimberly J. Brown as Marnie Piper, Gwen's older daughter and Aggie's older granddaughter
- Joey Zimmerman as Dylan Piper, Gwen's son and Aggie's grandson
- Phillip Van Dyke as Luke, Marnie's love interest
- Emily Roeske as Sophie Piper, Gwen's younger daughter and Aggie's younger granddaughter
- Robin Thomas as Kalabar, the mayor of Halloweentown
- James W. Crawford as dentist-creature
- Johnny Ulsendigger as ghost
- Judith M. Ford as Harriet
- Kenneth Choi as hip sales-creature
- Sherilyn Lawson as vampire mother
- Michael Patrick Egan as wolfie
- Rino Romano as the voice of Benny

== Production ==
=== Development ===
Steve White was the head of NBC's "Movie and Miniseries" department in the 1970s and 1980s. In 1986, White left the company to establish his own production company, Steve White Entertainment.

The Wonderful World of Disney, which had been airing on NBC since 1988, was a sought-after property, and ABC wanted it to return to the network. NBC agreed to relinquish the rights to ABC on the condition that Walt Disney Television produced six films for NBC in return.

In 1991, Sheri Singer, senior vice-president of TV films for Walt Disney Television, was assigned to collaborate with White on films to fulfill the contract with NBC.

After working together, they began dating and in 1993, Singer and White married. White shared a comment with Singer from his daughter: "I don't know where to go with this, but my daughter said to me, 'Dad, where do all the creatures from Halloween go the rest of the year when its not October 31?'" Dubbed Halloweentown the concept was pitched to NBC as part of the movie deal, and the network greenlit the project. With the green-light, Singer and White approached screenwriter Paul Bernbaum to write the script. Bernbaum took inspiration from his own life, and used the names of his children, Marnie, Dylan, and Sophie as the protagonists. The first draft of the film was geared towards an adult demographic. In 1994, the script was presented to NBC, and the network decided to pass on the project. Singer ended up leaving the Walt Disney Company at the end of January 1994.

In 1997, Singer and White established Singer/White Entertainment, and returned to the idea of Halloweentown. The duo pitched it to Disney Channel, who initially passed on the project as well. The executives at the network changed their mind after they aired Under Wraps, which was well received. The network returned to Singer/White Entertainment and the film was redeveloped into more of a children's film.

In a 2018 interview with Insider, director Duwayne Dunham revealed the film was presented to him as a "$20 million to $30 million project", but the budget ended up only being $4 million.

=== Casting ===
After receiving the go ahead from Disney Channel, Singer/White Entertainment began casting. The first person cast for the film was Debbie Reynolds, who at the time had just decided to venture into television work. A list of actors were purposed to Singer/White, and Sheri Singer said: "When we saw the list, we took one look at her name and said, oh my god, would she really do it? This is absolutely unbelievably blessed and terrific idea for casting... We never went to anyone else".

In 2016, Kimberly J. Brown recalled her audition for the film which she had to react to the conversation where it is revealed the character Marnie is a witch. Brown read for the role twice before being cast.

In a 2020 Galaxy Con question-and answer panel, Judith Hoag revealed she had a meeting with the head of Disney Television where she read for the part. Hoag, who had previously played April O'Neil in Teenage Mutant Ninja Turtles said: "I kind of knew in the room that I had gotten the job because his son was a die-hard Ninja Turtle fan".

According to Singer, the hardest role to cast was that of antagonist Kalabar, "...he had to be scary-but-Disney-Channel-scary". Robin Thomas, who had previously worked with White on Amityville Dollhouse was brought in to audition, and was the final choice.

=== Pre-production ===
After Kimberly J. Brown was cast as Marnie, artists used a photo of her to create the "Halloweentown" book prop. The image of the witch flying across the page needed to resemble the actress.

The initial ending of the film featured Marnie traveling deep into an enchanted forest to place the talisman. With each step the character was supposed to grow older the deeper into the forest she went, the make-up department took a life-mask of Kimberly J. Brown to make the different prosthetics to age Marnie. Before the make-up process was completed, the ending was rewritten, with Marnie placing the talisman in the Jack-o'-lantern.

=== Filming ===
Halloweentown was filmed in St. Helens, Oregon, and Scappoose, Oregon, starting in the middle of July 1998, lasting 24 days. The 'Nob Hill Riverview' bed and breakfast in Saint Helens was used for exterior shots of Aggie Cromwell's Halloweentown home. The voice of the skeleton Benny was added in post-production; as a result, the actors on set were performing opposite a voice-less animatronic.

While filming a dance scene in the theater, Debbie Reynolds pulled a muscle. Singer went on to say how impressive it was for the young actors on set to see what a "real work ethic" was.

The final scene shot during filming was of Marnie and Aggie flying. The flying scenes took a day to film, capturing the actors in front of a blue-screen.

== Release ==
Halloweentown premiered on Disney Channel on October 17, 1998. It was made available to stream on Disney+. In 2018, Disney made the film available for streaming on Disney Channel's YouTube channel through a live broadcast.

D23 celebrated the 25th anniversary of Halloweentown with special screenings in St. Helens, Oregon, on October 21, 2023, allowing fans to watch the film on the big screen in the theater where it was filmed, just after the original premiere date of October 17, 1998.

== Reception ==
=== Critical response ===
On the review aggregator website Rotten Tomatoes, the film holds an approval rating of 83% based on reviews from 6 critics, with an average rating of 5.7/10.

Laura Fries of Variety said that Halloweentown gains momentum after a slow start, largely due to the presence of "screen legend" Debbie Reynolds. They noted that although the film does not fully showcase Reynolds' acting skills, the actress manages to embrace her role as a matriarchal witch returning to guide her granddaughter into the family tradition. Fries also praised Kimberly J. Brown's portrayal of a young girl navigating her identity, avoiding the typical pitfalls of adolescent characterizations. Furthermore, Fries complimented the writing by Jon Cooksey and Ali Matheson, saying it incorporates topical humor and whimsical elements. Allison McClain Merrill of The Daily Beast stated that Halloweentown features strong performances, citing Kimberly J. Brown and Debbie Reynolds, saying they brought a unique charm to the film. Merrill found that the film's setting provides a fresh and enchanting dimension to Disney Channel's fall programming. They took notice of the film's enduring appeal, noting that it has become a beloved tradition among viewers, particularly millennials who grew up with it. Moreover, Merrill appreciated the film's message of creativity, individuality, and the importance of supportive relationships, which continues to resonate with audiences decades after its release.

Ashton Tate of MovieWeb asserted that Halloweentown stands out as one of the pioneering Disney Channel Original Movies. Tate said that despite its limited budget and outdated special effects, the film remains a top favorite. They praised Halloweentown for its role as a memorable introduction to its world and characters, noting the charm and nostalgic appeal of its low-budget effects. Tate also acknowledged that the success of the original film was pivotal in establishing the franchise, which has since become a beloved annual tradition for many fans. Ellen Dendy of Common Sense Media gave Halloweentown a score of three out of five stars and praised the film for its focus on brave and empathetic female characters who work together to protect their community, and for resolving family conflicts with love and mutual respect.

Complex magazine ranked Halloweentown as number nine on its "The 40 Best Disney Channel Original Movies" list. Katie Heaney for BuzzFeed called the first three films of the Halloweentown series one of the best things about Halloween.

=== Accolades ===
Kimberly J. Brown was nominated for Best Performance in a TV Movie/Pilot/Mini-Series or Series – Leading Young Actress at the 20th Youth in Film Awards.

== Sequels ==
Halloweentown was followed by three sequels: Halloweentown II: Kalabar's Revenge in 2001, Halloweentown High in 2004 and Return to Halloweentown in 2006. A fifth film is in development.

== See also ==
- Halloweentown (film series)
- List of films set around Halloween
