= Halloweentown II: Kalabar's Revenge =

2001 television film by Mary Lambert

- Promotional advertisement
- Based on: Characters by Paul Bernbaum
- Written by: Jon Cooksey; Ali Marie Matheson
- Directed by: Mary Lambert
- Starring: Kimberly J. Brown; Judith Hoag; Daniel Kountz; Joey Zimmerman; Emily Roeske; Phillip Van Dyke; Blu Mankuma; Peter Wingfield; Debbie Reynolds
- Composer: Mark Mothersbaugh
- Country of origin: United States
- Original language: English

Production
- Producer: Peter Lhotka
- Cinematography: Tony Westman
- Editor: Sharyn L. Ross
- Running time: 80 minutes
- Production company: Just Singer Entertainment

Original release
- Network: Disney Channel
- Release: October 12, 2001

Related
- Halloweentown; Halloweentown High; Return to Halloweentown

Halloweentown II: Kalabar's Revenge is a 2001 American fantasy comedy television film and the second installment in the Halloweentown series. Directed by Mary Lambert, it was released as a Disney Channel Original Movie on October 12, 2001. Set two years after the first film, Marnie returns to find Halloweentown's citizens transformed into dull, black-and-white humans. With the help of her friend Luke and Grandma Aggie, she seeks to uncover and reverse the "Grey Spell" before it is too late.

== Plot ==
Two years after visiting Halloweentown for the first time and defeating the evil warlock Kalabar, (Note: As depicted in Halloweentown (1998)) teenage witch Marnie Piper and her family are hosting a neighborhood Halloween party at their house in the mortal world. An attractive teenage boy, Kal, arrives at the party with his single father Alex, having just moved into the neighborhood. Marnie tries to win over Kal by showing him her grandmother Aggie Cromwell's magically hidden room, where he steals a spellbook without Marnie noticing. Before Kal leaves, he asks Marnie to be his date for a Halloween costume party at her high school later that night, and she gladly accepts. Outside, Kal opens a portal and walks through it.

Aggie notices that her magic bag, which is connected to her house in Halloweentown, is not working properly. After Aggie hands her grandson Dylan a skull-shaped walkie-talkie so they can communicate between worlds, she and Marnie travel to Halloweentown to investigate before the portal between Halloweentown and the mortal world, open only on Halloween, closes at midnight. They discover that the whole town has been turned into a black-and-white world, and that the inhabitants have become dreary, discolored, monotonous humans. Among the victims is Marnie's goblin friend Luke. Aggie diagnoses this as the "Grey Spell".

Aggie contacts Dylan back home for a spell from her spellbook, but Dylan and Sophie discover the book is missing. Kal talks to Marnie and Aggie through the grey cube that has replaced the town's giant jack-o'-lantern, revealing himself as a warlock and Kalabar's son, and admitting that he has cast the Grey Spell to complete his father's revenge on both Halloweentown and the mortal world. Aggie searches for a spare copy of her spellbook at her house in Halloweentown, but it is missing. During a conversation with Aggie, Marnie inadvertently reverts Luke back to his goblin form. Unable to explain the spell's reversal, the group believes that it is temporary.

The trio travel to the lair of the junkman of the universe, Gort, who acquires lost items from both realms. He has been discolored by the Grey Spell and sold most of his junk at a yard sale. As Aggie loses her color as well, the group finds that they have been locked inside Gort's house by Kal. Marnie uses a time travel spell provided by Aggie to go back to Gort's house before the Grey Spell happened. When Marnie and Luke arrive, Gort says he sold the spare spellbook to Kalabar approximately 50 years prior. By remembering the things Marnie had been hastefully saying back when Luke returned to his normal goblin form, they realize that the Grey Spell can be reverted by saying "Trapa", which is "Apart" spelled backwards.

In the mortal world, Dylan and Sophie realize that Alex is actually a golem made of frogs intended to distract their mother Gwen at the high-school Halloween party. The siblings head over to the party to warn their mother, who casts a spell that reverts Alex to a pile of frogs. Kal appears and casts the "Creature Spell", turning the party guests into the monsters they are dressed up as, resulting in chaos. Dylan and Sophie hide from the monster humans, including their mother.

Marnie turns Aggie back to normal, but the portal to the mortal world closes, trapping them in Halloweentown. Marnie contacts her siblings and they, along with Aggie and Luke, develop a new spell that forces the portal between Halloweentown and the mortal world to reopen permanently. Kal angrily confronts Marnie, who mocks him and demands the spellbooks back. Kal offers them up, covering them in electrified vines. Marnie, believing that good is stronger than evil, retrieves the books. Kal is sent away by the vines and the family breaks his spells in the mortal world and in Halloweentown.

== Cast ==
- Kimberly J. Brown as Marnie Piper
- Judith Hoag as Gwen Piper, Marnie's widowed mother
- Daniel Kountz as Kal, Kalabar's son
- Joey Zimmerman as Dylan Piper, Marnie's younger brother
- Emily Roeske as Sophie Piper, Marnie's younger sister
- Phillip Van Dyke as Luke, Marnie's close friend
- Blu Mankuma as Gort
- Peter Wingfield as Alex, Kal's partner
- Debbie Reynolds as Aggie Cromwell, Marnie's maternal grandmother
- Richard Side as Benny
- Xantha Radley as Astrid
- Jessica Lucas as Cindy

== Production ==
=== Casting ===
In a 2020 Galaxy Con Q&A panel, Daniel Kountz revealed he had four or five auditions for the film.

== Release ==
Halloweentown II: Kalabar's Revenge premiered on Disney Channel on October 12, 2001. It was made available to stream on Disney+.

In 2018, Disney made the film available for streaming on Disney Channel's YouTube channel through a live broadcast.

== Reception ==
=== Critical response ===
Andy Herrera of Complex described Halloweentown II: Kalabar's Revenge as a darker and more intense sequel to the first film, saying it bears similarities to an episode of Buffy the Vampire Slayer where characters become their Halloween costumes. They highlighted that while the sequel maintains the appeal of returning to Halloweentown, it represents the best installment among the Halloweentown sequels, noting improvements such as slightly enhanced special effects, including time travel sequences. Herrera also found the film to be creepier and more serious compared to its predecessor. Rebecca Alter of Vulture stated that Halloweentown II surpasses its predecessor in quality. They described the sequel as featuring a more compelling narrative, and noted that the plot parallels a Buffy the Vampire Slayer episode where characters transform into their Halloween costumes, finding that it heightens the stakes and enhances the sense of menace with the character of Kalabar. Furthermore, she also praised the film for expanding the franchise's universe and lore, saying it provides tween viewers with an engaging storyline.

Chelsea Candelario of PureWow took notice of the anticipation surrounding the sequel, noting the original Halloweentown's considerable success and affirming that the sequel lived up to the expectations. Candelario suggested that the film might even be better than its predecessor, highlighting its engaging plot with unexpected twists, new antagonists, and memorable moments that continue to resonate with fans. Ellen Dendy of Common Sense Media gave Halloweentown II: Kalabar's Revenge a score of three out of five stars and noted that it creates some suspense as the protagonist races against time to save her friends and family from the antagonist's spell, asserting that it may be slightly tense for younger viewers, but observed that the sequel is less frightening than the original Halloweentown, finding that it incorporates humor into the more intense or sad moments, citing a curse that transforms the quirky residents of Halloweentown into ordinary humans who engage in mundane activities like sorting socks and wearing dull clothing, stating it adds a humorous touch to the narrative.

Anna Govert of Paste ranked Halloweentown II: Kalabar's Revenge third in their "10 Best Disney Channel Halloween Movies" list. Aubrey Page of Collider ranked Halloweentown II: Kalabar's Revenge nine in their "Every Disney Channel Original Movie" list.

=== Accolades ===
Kimberly J. Brown was nominated for Best Performance in a TV Movie or Special - Leading Young Actress while Joey Zimmerman was nominated for Best Performance in a TV Movie or Special - Supporting Young Actor at the 23rd Young Artist Awards.

== Sequels ==
Halloweentown II: Kalabar's Revenge was followed by two sequels: Halloweentown High in 2004 and Return to Halloweentown in 2006. A third sequel is in development.

== See also ==
- List of films set around Halloween
- Halloweentown (film series)
- Halloweentown (1998)
- Halloweentown High (2004)
- Return to Halloweentown (2006)
