= Daniel Kountz =

American actor and realtor (born 1978)

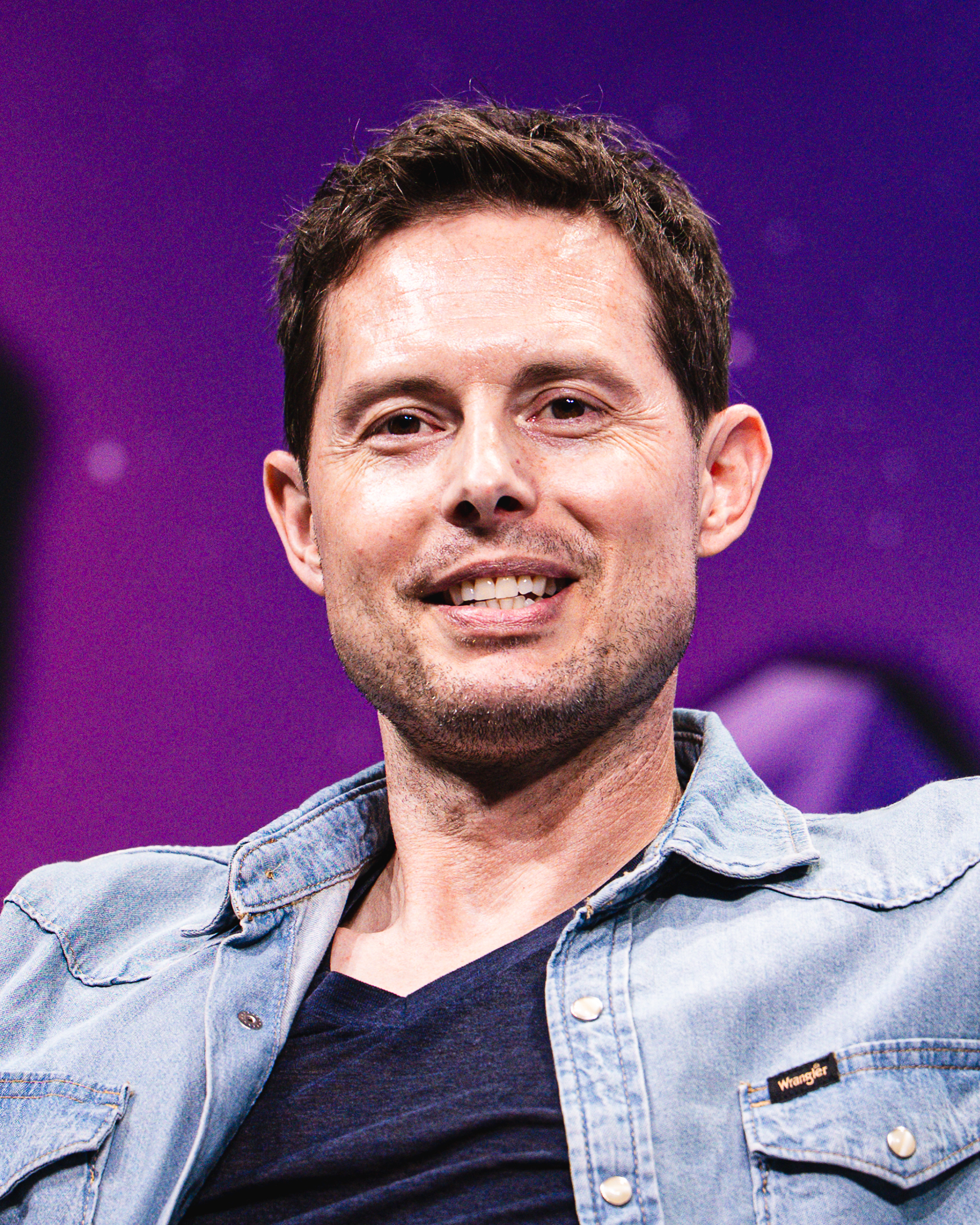
- Kountz at GalaxyCon Oklahoma City in 2026
- Born: October 16, 1978 (age 47); Portland, Oregon, U.S.
- Occupations: Actor, realtor
- Years active: 1998–present
- Notable work: Halloweentown II: Kalabar's Revenge
- Spouse: Kimberly J. Brown (m. 2024)

Daniel Kountz (born October 16, 1978) is an American actor and realtor.

== Early life ==
Kountz began acting in third grade playing "Tiny Tim" in a school play.

== Career ==
Kountz has been on television and in movies. In 1998, he portrayed Ray "The Hood" Wood in Fifteen and Pregnant acting alongside Kirsten Dunst. In 2001, he played his most notable character, Kal in Halloweentown II: Kalabar's Revenge; he acted alongside Kimberly J. Brown. In a 2020 question-and-answer panel, Kountz revealed he had four or five auditions for the film before being cast. He also was in an episode of Ghost Whisperer titled Ghost in the Machine, as the avatar. He has had parts in Just Shoot Me, 3rd Rock from the Sun, Crossing Jordan, and a few other television shows. In 2025, he starred in the TV movie Haul Out the Halloween for the Hallmark Channel opposite Lacey Chabert and wife Kimberly J. Brown. He is a real estate agent in Los Angeles.

== Personal life ==
Kountz began dating his Halloweentown II costar Kimberly J. Brown after they reconnected for a "Halloweentown" themed project for Brown's YouTube channel. In June 2022, Brown announced their engagement on social media. In April 2024, the couple were married.

== Filmography ==
=== Film ===
| Year | Title | Role | Notes |
|---|---|---|---|
| 1999 | 10 Things I Hate About You | Admirer #1 | Uncredited |
| 2005 | Confession | Malachi | |
| 2009 | No Time to Fear | Derek | |
| 2009 | Casualties | Anderson | Short |
| 2014 | My Demon Girlfriend | Norman | Short |
| 2017 | TRIPLE TIMe | Tim | Short |
| 2019 | Prospectors The Forgiven | Prospectors 1 | |

=== Television ===
| Year | Title | Role | Notes |
|---|---|---|---|
| 1998 | Fifteen and Pregnant | Ray Wood | Television movie |
| 1999 | Martial Law | Tod | Episode: "Blue Flu" |
| 2000 | JAG | Cadet | Episode: "Into the Breach" |
| 2000 | The Jersey | T-Bone | 2 episodes |
| 2001 | Boston Public | Phill Robeson | Episode: "Chapter Nine" |
| 2001 | ER | Reed Silvan | Episode: "Sailing Away" |
| 2001 | 3rd Rock from the Sun | Jimmy | Episode: "Mary Loves Scoochie: Part 1" |
| 2001 | Halloweentown II: Kalabar's Revenge | Kal | TV movie |
| 2001 | Just Shoot Me! | Milo | Episode: "Bye Bye Binnie" |
| 2002 | Crossing Jordan | Private Aaron Neil | Episode: "With Honor" |
| 2003 | American Dreams | Paul | 2 episodes |
| 2004 | Quintuplets | Brady | Episode: "Shall We Fight" |
| 2008 | Ghost Whisperer | Cal | Episode: "Ghost in the Machine" |
| 2009 | Mad Men | Gary Osborne | Episode: "The Arrangements" |
| 2010 | United States of Tara | Fourth Doctor | Episode: "Explosive Diorama" |
| 2013 | My Crazy Roommate | Dmitri Ivanov / Dimitri | Recurring role |
| 2014 | Youthful Daze | Connor Phillips | Recurring role |
| 2025 | Haul Out the Halloween | Marvin | Television film |

=== Video games ===
| Year | Title | Role |
|---|---|---|
| 2011 | L.A. Noire | Francis Watkins |
| 2013 | Lost Planet 3 | Gale Holden, Zoda |
| 2022 | God of War Ragnarök | Byggvir |
