= The Kurgan =

Fictional character

The Kurgan (Victor Kruger)
- Highlander character
- First appearance: Highlander
- Portrayed by: Clancy Brown (1986 film); Dave Bautista (reboot)

In-universe information
- Born: October 6, 1005 BC; Russia
- Immortality: 970 BC
- Death: 1985; New York, New York
- Teacher: The Bedouin

The Kurgan is a fictional character from the first Highlander film. He is portrayed by Clancy Brown. He is an Immortal, the main antagonist to Connor MacLeod in Highlander, and the latter's ultimate opponent in the Gathering. The Kurgan's life story is fleshed out in several Highlander spin-offs in various media.

Scott Glenn and Roy Scheider were the original choices for the role before the character was changed to a brutal barbarian psychopath. Arnold Schwarzenegger was offered but turned down the role. Rutger Hauer and Nick Nolte were considered for the role until Clancy Brown was cast after he was recommended by Sting whom he had work with in the movie The Bride. Brown was initially reluctant to take the role as while shooting The Bride he had an allergic reaction to the prosthetics.

== Highlander ==
Clancy Brown as the Kurgan

The Kurgan was born in what is now Russia on the coast of the Caspian Sea. His tribe, part of the Kurgan culture, were infamous for their cruelty, known to "toss children into pits full of starved dogs, and watch them fight for [the] meat" for amusement.

In 1536, the Kurgan hires himself out to Clan Fraser in their battle with the MacLeod clan, in exchange for allowing him to be the one to kill Connor MacLeod. In the midst of the battle, the Kurgan challenges MacLeod and runs him through with his broadsword. However, Connor's cousins Angus, Dougal and other MacLeods force the Kurgan back, rescuing Connor from beheading. The Kurgan screams: "Another time, MacLeod!" Five years later, another Immortal, Ramírez, seeks out MacLeod as the only hope of defeating the Kurgan. However, the Kurgan discovers this and tracks them down to MacLeod's home. MacLeod is away, but Ramírez and Heather MacLeod, Connor's wife, are there. He battles Ramírez, who slices Kurgan's throat (though not deep enough to behead him) before being impaled and decapitated. After taking Ramirez's Quickening, the Kurgan rapes Heather and departs.

The Kurgan and Connor MacLeod meet again in 1985, in New York City, where the Gathering is to take place. During this time, the Kurgan uses his status as a New York City criminal skinhead gang leader as a fake background and goes by the alias "Victor Kruger." The last six Immortals are Victor, MacLeod, Sunda Kastagir, Iman Fasil, Osta Vasilek, and Yung Dol Kim. Vasilek is beheaded by the Kurgan in New Jersey before he learns of Fasil's death in Madison Square Garden at the hands of MacLeod. He then defeats both Kim and Connor's friend Kastagir, leaving just him and McLeod. In order to throw Connor's concentration off, the Kurgan kidnaps his then-girlfriend, Brenda Wyatt, and takes her to the Silvercup Studios building.

MacLeod follows them to the site, where he and the Kurgan face each other in combat. MacLeod beheads his foe, his essence passing to the Highlander, winner of "The Prize".

=== Novelization ===
The novelization of the film by Garry Kilworth expands on the Kurgan's early life. His first death occurred in 970 BC (incongruously long after the Kurgan culture) when his drunken father crushed his head with a rock. Upon returning to life, the Kurgan forced his father to swallow a searing hot stone, killing him. He then went off to join a group of bandits that raided caravans. He eventually encountered another Immortal, "The Bedouin", who revealed to him his true nature, and who became the only person who could be labeled as his friend. During the intervening centuries, the Kurgan took an incalculable number of Immortal heads.

Circa 410 AD, the Kurgan joined the Vandals, Goths, and Visigoths in attacking Rome and other Roman settlements, also fighting with the Goths against the Huns. He would then later ally himself with the Huns directly, fighting alongside Attila, around the year 453. From the fifth to thirteenth centuries, the Kurgan would spread terror with the Tatars of the Gobi and the Turks, as well as with Viking raiders and the Mongol horde of Genghis Khan.

== Highlander II: The Quickening ==
In the final shooting draft of the Highlander II: The Quickening screenplay, it was revealed that the Kurgan was in fact originally sent from the planet Zeist to Earth by General Katana in order to hunt down Connor MacLeod and Ramirez before either of them could win "The Prize" and therefore return to Zeist. The scene was scheduled for filming, and actor Clancy Brown has discussed how he was contacted by the film's producers to make an appearance:

They sent me, like, the first 10 pages of it, and I said, "What the F... What is this? Give me the rest of the script?" And they said, "Well, we want your commitment before we give you the rest of the script." And they said, "Well, we're just gonna pay you the same." And I said, "Nah, see you later. [Laughs] I'm not gonna do this. First of all, this makes no sense. Second of all, you're not gonna pay me anything. So there's no reason for me to do this at all!" So then Christopher [Lambert] calls me up and says, "Oh, you've got to do this with us! You've got to do this with us!" I said, "Chris, it's horrible. The idea is terrible, what I read was awful..." And he says, "I helped write that." [Laughs] I'm, like, "Well, I guess I'm never gonna be doing any more Highlanders!" He’s a great guy and I love him to death, but it was doomed from the beginning. If I wasn't getting paid... I will do shit for money. But I'm not gonna do shit for no money. I'll do quality for no money. So if it had been any good, maybe. But it was no good from the get-go.

== Highlander: The Series ==
In Highlander: The Series, the Kurgan's death effectively is the beginning of the Gathering. The Kurgan is mentioned in the episode "The Watchers".

After Darius's death in Paris, in 1993, Duncan MacLeod returned to Seacouver to learn more about the Watchers, and the Hunters. His investigation led him to Joe Dawson, a Watcher, who had no alternative but to tell him who they were. To exemplify the Watchers' knowledge, Dawson showed Duncan his fellow Clansman Connor's, the Kurgan's, and his own personal databases. Among other Immortals listed as being slain by the Kurgan in this database were Ivan Trotski and Flavio Parocchi. In contrast to the Kurgan's background in the film continuity, the series portrays the Kurgan as being much younger, having received his immortality in 1453 (according to the screen display that Joe shows Duncan). According to Dawson, Connor MacLeod did the world "a big favor" by killing the Kurgan.

In the season 6 episode "The End of Innocence", Duncan's teacher Graham Ashe indirectly references the Kurgan, saying that while he himself is a great swordsman, there are those that are better, just as the Kurgan was better than Ashe's student Juan Sánchez-Villalobos Ramírez.

In the Watcher Chronicles DVD supplements, it's also mentioned that from 1981 to 1985, the Kurgan was watched by future leader of the Hunters, James Horton.

== Highlander: Way of the Sword ==
Highlander: Way of the Sword, published by Dynamite Entertainment, further expands on Kurgan's life and gives him more encounters with Connor.

In 476 BC, allying himself with the Persians as part of a special fighting unit, Kurgan took part in the Battle of Plataea in ancient Greece. During the battle, he faced off with a Spartan warrior who wielded a katana made by the master swordsmith Masamune, strong enough to shatter Kurgan's blade. He escaped by falling down a cliff, and was borne away by the flow of the battle. From this experience, Kurgan learnt the value of steel and a well-crafted blade. The Spartan warrior fought in the battle was revealed to be fellow Immortal Tak Ne, later known as Ramírez. Kurgan would also encounter him in Babylonia and ancient China before their final confrontation in Scotland.

Kurgan would join the naval forces of Napoleon Bonaparte of France in 1804, and while serving aboard one ship, would run into Connor MacLeod serving aboard HMS Victory under Admiral Nelson. MacLeod was able to fatally stab Kurgan, but before he could behead him, a mainmast fell, and the two were separated. Moreover, MacLeod's weapon became lodged in the Kurgan's body. The ship sank, taking Kurgan to the sea's bottom, where he revived and claimed the Masamune katana as his own.

After these events, Kurgan would return to his native Russia, pillaging alongside the Cossacks near the end of the nineteenth century. During the First World War, in 1918 Galluzo, Italy, Kurgan hired two gypsy women, Natasha and Stasya, to lure Francesco, an Immortal monk, from holy ground with the promise of sexual favors. Once the monk left holy ground, Kurgan challenged him, and quickly took his head. Afterwards, he had his way with the two women. While Kurgan slept, Stasya managed to steal MacLeod's Masamune katana in payment for services rendered, but left Kurgan his claymore.

During the 1960s during the Cold War, Kurgan entered into an unholy partnership with the government of the Soviet Union to create a genetically engineered army of mortal super-soldiers purportedly loyal to the U.S.S.R., but in fact created to aid Kurgan in his quest for "The Prize" – men possessing greatly slowed metabolism and aging, as well as superior fighting and swordsmanship abilities. Kurgan and these soldiers would confront Connor MacLeod and a group of other fellow Immortals in 1964, with Kurgan himself gravely (yet temporarily) wounded during the battle, allowing Connor and the others to escape with their lives.

These devoted followers of Kurgan would continue to remain active for decades, even following his death in New York City in 1985, seeking to destroy MacLeod for his actions in the first Highlander film. Kurgan's influence would continue to be felt in the world for some time to come – Connor MacLeod received a "Dark Quickening" from his enemy, resulting in the deaths of several innocent Immortals at Connor's hands in early 1987, until Duncan MacLeod aided in purging Kurgan's last influences from his cousin's tortured psyche.
