= Amanda (Highlander) =

- Highlander character
- First appearance: "The Lady and the Tiger"
- Portrayed by: Elizabeth Gracen

In-universe information
- Born: c. 820 AD
- Immortality: 2580, or before 860 AD
- Teacher: Rebecca Horne

Amanda is a fictional character in the television series Highlander: The Series and Highlander: The Raven, portrayed by Elizabeth Gracen. She is one of the Immortals, immune to old age and death except by taking the head off. Some Immortals play The Game, seeking each other out for a duel to the death, for which the survivor is rewarded with a Quickening.

Amanda was created to be a former lover of fellow Immortal Duncan MacLeod, the protagonist of the Highlander: The Series television series. She originally appeared in the 1993 episode "The Lady and the Tiger" as a "villain of the week" type character. However, the writers and fans enjoyed her cunning, lying, immoral, selfish, and manipulative ways and she remained a part of the series. She then starred in a short-lived series of her own, Highlander: The Raven.

== Biography ==
Amanda was born in St. Anne in Normandy, France in 820 (though the exact date is unclear). She is poor, starving, and uneducated, and her skills as a thief are rudimentary at best. She is caught stealing food from a plague-ridden house and savagely beaten about the head, resulting in her first death. Since she allegedly consumed contaminated food, her body is to be cast into a cleansing fire in an attempt to keep from spreading the plague further. However, the Immortal Rebecca Horne saves her from that fate just as Amanda breathes her last.

Rebecca becomes Amanda's mentor, but they eventually become good friends. She teaches Amanda about The Game, but also about life and personal growth. It is Rebecca's fondness, empathy, and friendship that motivates Amanda to try to live, if just for a little while, as a "proper lady" should. Amanda leaves Rebecca and the Abbey of St. Anne in 853; as a parting gift, Rebecca gives Amanda a piece of her crystal, The Methuselah Stone, something she had done before with some of her other pupils. It is rumored that whoever possesses all the pieces of the stone would become invincible. Breaking up the stone proves to be an effective means of keeping this from occurring, though it would put Amanda's life at risk in "Methuselah's Gift".

During her travels later that same year, Amanda meets the Immortal Hengist the Saxon, who challenges her to The Game. Fearing for her life, she runs back to Rebecca's abbey instead, knowing the Immortal will not fight her on Holy Ground. Rather than coddling her, however, Rebecca advises her ward to consider facing her demons, pointing out that she will not be able to run forever. Gathering her courage, Amanda not only faces the Immortal Saxon, she wins and receives her first Quickening. She leaves the abbey a final time to face an uncertain future.

She eventually gains a reputation for being one of the world's most audacious, enterprising, and elusive of thieves, managing to appropriate items thought to be unstealable – the rarest of jewels, paintings, money, just about anything she desires, and she rarely gets caught.

In 1635, she and Rebecca meet newly Immortal Duncan MacLeod. Her relationship with Duncan becomes intimate and is renewed sporadically through the centuries. They share many misadventures, such as the bank robbery days a la Bonnie and Clyde with Cory Raines (1926) and the robbery of the Stone of Scone (1950) with Hugh Fitzcairn. Besides being an accomplished thief, she holds many jobs such as an harem dancer (1753), casino owner (1888), nightclub singer (1936), acrobat, tightwire artist, bank robber, teacher, and antique dealer.

After Tessa's death, Amanda becomes a periodic constant in Duncan's life, and they share many adventures, avenging Rebecca's death by her pupil Luther (1994), meeting Watcher Joe Dawson (1994), fighting against Kalas (1995) and discovering the secrets of the Methuselah's Stone (1996). It is her relationship with Duncan that ultimately motivates her to leave her life of crime and grudgingly embrace being a law-abiding citizen. Even so, Amanda is always willing and perhaps even eager to utilize her skills to benefit friends and loved ones in times of peril, such as in "The Cross of St. Antoine".

== Alternative Amanda ==
Once, when Duncan MacLeod is killed temporarily, he is thrown into another reality where he was never born. In this alternate reality, without Duncan in her life, Amanda never leaves her thieving ways and is a lot more evil than the real Amanda. She is killed by The Hunters led by James Horton, who are still active because Duncan never existed and nobody has been able to stop them.

== Spin-off ==
Elizabeth Ward Gracen returned as Amanda, this time in the lead role in the series spin-off Highlander: The Raven. The show lasted one season in 1998–1999.

While Amanda is being investigated for burglary, a police officer named Claudia Hoffman jumps in front of a bullet meant for her, not knowing she is Immortal. Saddened by Claudia's needless sacrifice, Amanda decides to mend her ways. She meets a pre-Immortal cop, Claudia's partner, Nick Wolfe. He becomes the new man in her life. One day, Nick is poisoned. To save his life, she shoots him to trigger his immortality. When Nick wakes up, he becomes angry with Amanda's decision because it was not her choice to make. He then leaves her, implying in narration that he is in love with her, and that the problem with this is that being an immortal means one of them must eventually die in the Game.

== Personality and relationships ==
Amanda manipulates friend and foe alike; she does whatever it takes to achieve her goals no matter the obstacle. She lives for centuries without looking back, without allowing herself to be distracted by the consequences of her actions. Yet she rarely steals from moral, ethical people, electing instead to pilfer from banks, museums, private collectors and corporations. Lacking in neither confidence or ambition, she is once compared to a shark by Duncan. All of these things aside, Amanda does have a softer side which she rarely shows to others. A prime example of this is Amanda's enduring friendship to her old mortal friend, Lucy Becker. Lucy is, the closest thing Amanda has to a confidant who provides advice and a sympathetic ear at different times.

=== Duncan MacLeod ===
Amanda's relationship with Duncan is erratic; more often than not, she appears out of the blue, usually to ask some new favor from him. Their relationship is ongoing for centuries and continues into the present. They often go decades without seeing one another, but have been known to spend a year or more together before amicably going their separate ways. Amanda unabashedly exploits him and although he seems to be aware of this, rather than deny her, he merely plays along, more amused by her antics than annoyed, knowing that she usually means well. However, despite her beguiling shenanigans, she is steadfastly loyal to Duncan, and he to her. The two have expressed their love for each other, knowing it is different from mortal love, and show it in their loyalty and devotion to each other. Both become involved in other relationships throughout their lives, but always make their way back to each other. In the series finale, Duncan admits his love to Amanda and tells her that she has always "made his heart glad."

=== Methos ===
She also develops an ally in, and a complex relationship with, Methos, the only person who can match her. While Duncan endures her wily schemes, Methos admires her cunning, survivalistic nature. Like squabbling siblings, they share a fondness and respect for each other that stems from having such similar life views and pragmatic characteristics, though neither would verbally admit such a thing. This friendship is strained in "Methuselah's Gift", when masked thugs try to kill Amanda to steal the Methuselah's Stone shard from her. The piece of the stone the Amanda had was a prized possession to her as it was a gift from her former teacher, mentor and close friend, Rebecca Horne. The series of events is still further complicated by Rebecca's recent death and Amanda still handling the grief that she was feeling. She and Duncan play with the idea of Methos being the mastermind behind the plot since it is no secret Methos needs the crystal shard to cure Alexa, his cancer afflicted lover. Upon realizing Methos is not after her head, she helps Methos try to steal the stone in the Watcher's vault, but Methos gets caught by a renegade Watcher. Amanda negotiates an exchange, her piece of the crystal for Methos' life, but the crystal is broken and plummets into the river, destroying any hope Methos has of using it to cure Alexa.

=== Rebecca Horne ===
This was the immortal who found and trained Amanda. She was a master swordsman, philosopher, humanitarian and educator. She made her home on holy ground as part of an abbey for a significant part of her life (though this is in the context of she was nobility, immortal, and had trained immortals before, prior to discovering Amanda and her own death). One of these students, Luther came after her to retrieve her shard of the Methuselah Stone (Ep 19 - Legacy). She sacrificed her own life without fighting back, so that she could safeguard the life of her beloved mortal husband, John. She was older than even Amanda herself, meaning over 1000-1200 yrs old (at the least). She saved Amanda from being burned alive during a plague crisis and took her into her home and trained her. The two women were the best of friends until Amanda tried stealing from her and was confronted by Rebecca, who promptly forgave her. Rebecca saw this as a lesson for Amanda and gently pushed the young immortal out on her own. Amanda returned to her teacher for help when she was challenged by another immortal for the first time. Again, Rebecca forced her to face the immortal on her own and grow from the experience. In later years, the two apparently remained close friends and Amanda was deeply grief-stricken and saddened to lose her teacher. Amanda refused to give up the piece of the stone Rebecca had given to her because it was all she had left of her. Although, she did give it to Methos as a show of support when he travelled to be at the bedside of his dying lover.

=== Kenny ===
800 years ago, Amanda found a 10-year-old Immortal boy named Kenny and taught him about The Game and how to survive it. Being killed so young, he will forever live as a child, thus learns fast that his main weapon is his seeming innocence. After Amanda is captured by the soldiers who have killed him and his family, he runs away. Amanda survives, but is not able to find him. In 1995, she once again meets him. Kenny, however, is no longer the boy she knew. He betrays her and Duncan to Terence Kincaid, who has a grudge against Duncan. Amanda is heartbroken with the idea that Kenny is not a boy, but more a man in a child's body. She always considered him as a son that she could not have, forgetting that he is an Immortal who has grown up and only wants to win The Game.

=== Derrick Markham ===
Just like Duncan MacLeod, who has been married only once (as far as is known) in the past, Amanda apparently also married an Immortal named Derrick Markham. They were separated and estranged for 132 years. Amanda betrayed him to the authorities because he was a brutal criminal. In 1999, Amanda defeats him in battle, because he wants to kill Amanda and her friends.

== Characterization ==
Executive Producer William Panzer thinks Amanda is "a beautiful, funny, international grand thief kind of character, who's crazy mad about MacLeod, but also crazy mad about her own freedom. And when Amanda comes into his life, if he's free, they have a moment. And she generally slips off into the night".

== Amanda in The Game ==
With no real interest in winning The Game, Amanda instead focuses on staying alive, and so has minimized the number of duels she fights. When faced with another Immortal, she typically runs or cons her way out or has to be rescued by a friend like Duncan. On occasions where she seeks out a battle, she almost always meets with disaster.

During the original series, her swordsmanship appeared to be less-than exceptional, and in fact she was never actually shown winning, even against an unarmed Kalas. Her skills receive a considerable upgrade after she meets Nick Wolfe and decides to redeem her life. It is unlikely that Amanda could have survived as long as she has without possessing expert fighting skills and cunning. The previous conjecture would lend support to Amanda depending more upon her skill as a manipulator then as a combatant. However, after she meets Nick Wolfe she lends more toward being a highly skilled fighter, winning numerous battles in a relatively short time. It can be argued that after she meets Nick; she becomes more exposed to the immortal community in general as she works with Nick on various freelance security operations, hence the need to exercise her combat skills. Below are the Quickenings seen in the original series and The Raven series:

1. Hengist the Saxon^{1}, 853 ("Methuselah's Gift")
2. Zachary Blaine^{2}, 1993 ("The Lady and the Tiger")
3. Mario Cardoza, 1998 ("Full Disclosure")
4. Stefan Collier, 1998 ("Immunity")
5. Wilson Geary, 1998 ("Passion Play")
6. Crysta, 1998 ("A Matter of Time")
7. Andre Korda, 1998 ("The French Connection")
8. Frank Brennen, 1999 ("The Rogue")
9. Talia Bauer, 1999 ("Inferno")
10. Derrick Markham, 1999 ("Love and Death")
11. Vladimir Rankov, 1999 ("The Manipulator")
12. Dr. Julian Heller^{3}, 1999 ("The Ex-Files")
13. Evan Peyton, 1999 ("Dead on Arrival")
14. Unknown, 2008 (Reunion)

^{1}First beheading.

^{2}Duncan MacLeod defeats Blaine, but Amanda beheads him.

^{3}Beheaded by Nick Wolfe.

== Watchers ==
The following is a list of all of Amanda's known Watchers:

Years	Watcher
850–853	Melucine
853-??	Whitread the Tinker
??-1182-1183-??	Elsbeth of Maldon
??-Sep 1635-??	Gabriel Sabatini
??-Sep 1753-??	Nabil al Alem
??-1804-??	Claus Sieger
??-Oct 1888–??	Wallace Hammond
??-Mar 1936	Otto Goff
Mar 1936–??	Gerta Schoernin
??-Dec 1950	Richard Bryce
Apr 1951–??	Richard Bryce
1969–1970	Renee Ginsburg
1995 – Mar 1996	Daniel Geiger

== Appearances ==
=== Highlander: The Series episodes ===
- "The Lady and the Tiger"
- "The Return of Amanda"
- "Legacy"
- "The Cross of St. Antoine"
- "Rite of Passage"
- "Finale"
- "Finale Part 2"
- "Double Eagle"
- "Reunion"
- "The Colonel"
- "Methuselah's Gift"
- "The Immortal Cimoli"
- "Dramatic License"
- "Money No Object"
- "The Stone of Scone"
- "Forgive Us Our Trespasses"
- "To Be"
- "Not To Be"

=== Raven episodes ===
- "Reborn"
- "Full Disclosure"
- "Bloodlines"
- "Immunity"
- "So Shall Ye Reap"
- "Birthright"
- "Crime and Punishment"
- "The Unknown Soldier"
- "Cloak and Dagger"
- "Passion Play"
- "The Devil You Know"
- "A Matter of Time"
- "The French Connection"
- "The Rogue"
- "Inferno"
- "The Frame"
- "Love and Death"
- "Thick as Thieves"
- "The Manipulator"
- "The Ex-Files"
- "War and Peace"
- "Dead on Arrival"

=== Books ===
- White Silence
- An Evening at Joe's
