= Darius (Highlander) =

- Highlander character
- First appearance: "Band of Brothers"
- Portrayed by: Werner Stocker

In-universe information
- Born: 38 AD, Ural Mountains
- Immortality: 83 AD
- Death: 1993
- Teacher: Ahasuerus the Parthian

Darius is a fictional character from Highlander: The Series, portrayed by actor Werner Stocker. He first appeared in the season one episode "Band of Brothers" (1993) and is featured in four subsequent episodes of the same season, as well as in one Highlander novel. A two-thousand-year-old Immortal living as a monk in Paris, France, he is a friend and mentor of protagonist Duncan MacLeod.

He is a peace advocate, having rejected violence fifteen hundred years ago. He is retired on Holy Ground where other Immortals are forbidden to fight him and lives in his spartanly furnished rectory, visited by other Immortals, studying old books, playing martial games, and brewing ancient beverages.

Creative Consultant David Abramowitz's initial idea of Darius having an ugly face but a beautiful soul was abandoned when Stocker was cast and Darius became a moral figure of the show. Darius' further development in following seasons was prevented by Stocker's illness and subsequent death, leading Abramowitz to rewrite the season one final episode "The Hunters" (1993).

== Appearances ==
A recurring character, Darius appeared in five episodes of the first season of Highlander: The Series and is a character in the Highlander novel Highlander: Shadow of Obsession.

=== Highlander: The Series ===
Darius' first appearance was in "Band of Brothers" (1993). Darius is visited in his chapel in Paris by fellow Immortal and former pupil Grayson (James Horan). Grayson has just killed the man Darius planted in Grayson's organization to spy on him. Darius is shocked by the man's death, to which Grayson answers that he will continue killing Darius' protégés until Darius leaves Holy Ground and faces him for having betrayed him fourteen hundred years ago.

Darius sends a secret message in ancient runes to MacLeod in Seacouver, Washington asking him to protect Victor Paulus, another protégé of his, from Grayson. MacLeod tells Richie Ryan (Stan Kirsch) Darius' legend: two thousand years old, an ancient general and Grayson was his second-in-command. Fifteen hundred years ago, Darius could have led his armies across Europe and ruled for a thousand years, but he turned his armies back to become a peacemaker and Grayson felt betrayed. MacLeod then recounts, "The legend has it Darius killed a holy man at the gates of Paris. The oldest living Immortal at that time. And suddenly he changed. He turned his back on war." Richie rationalizes that the holy man's Quickening went to Darius and made him benevolent, the only known example of a Light Quickening. However, a deleted line from the script has MacLeod say: "Maybe what the Old One told him finally made sense to Darius", suggesting an intellectual realization of the horrors of war rather than the overwhelming positive power of the holy man's Quickening.

MacLeod's memories of his first encounter with Darius are then shown in a flashback sequence set at the Battle of Waterloo. A British soldier, MacLeod carries a sick comrade when he meets Darius. MacLeod is eager to get back to fight, but Darius vehemently tries to show him the worth of human life and the futility of war. MacLeod protests that he has always been a warrior, fighting battles he believed to be just. Darius counters, "Oh, I'm sure. You're quite loyal to your convictions and compatriots. But I wonder what these men think about that, about convictions and compatriotism now?" MacLeod watches the snow-covered battlefield where men are dying, lost for words. The subsequent flashback, set at Darius' chapel in Paris in 1816 (date from script), shows Darius facing three burglars. The chief brigand stabs him to death for having no gold to steal. Out of the church, they meet MacLeod who defeats two of them. Darius, who has just revived, urges MacLeod to spare the third one, who flees. Darius is truly pained by the death of his own murderer, while MacLeod feels he has done well by ridding the world of a killer. He frustratedly admits that he is unable to follow Darius' teachings. Darius sadly realizes that MacLeod is leaving him to go to America, away from the hatred of Europe. Back in the present, MacLeod protects Paulus' life. After meeting Grayson and realizing he will not stop chasing Paulus, he fights and beheads him. Then MacLeod leaves Seacouver for Paris and meets Darius again. Learning of Grayson's death, Darius comments, "He was once my closest friend on earth."

In "For Tomorrow We Die" (1993), Darius is visited in his church by Immortal Xavier St. Cloud (Roland Gift) who has just killed six people in the heist of a nearby jewelry store. St. Cloud confesses the murders and humiliates Darius, saying one of the great warriors in history does nothing to stop him. Later, MacLeod in turn visits Darius for a game of chess, and suspects what happened when Inspector LeBrun comes in to investigate the murders and mentions poison gas. Darius is bound by the secret of confession and says nothing, to the great annoyance of LeBrun. When MacLeod visits Darius again later, Darius recollects having found St. Cloud hiding from the police in his church long ago. St. Cloud would have had to face guillotine for having stolen a piece of jewelry. Darius comments, "You know, that's hardly a crime to die for." He expresses guilt and concern about St. Cloud's behavior, believing he should have stopped St. Cloud, and considers leaving holy ground to prevent further killings. MacLeod dissuades him and eventually faces St. Cloud, who loses a hand and escapes.

In the following episode, "The Beast Below" (1993), MacLeod is searching for Immortal Ursa (Christian Van Acker) and visits Darius for help. Darius recalls having met Ursa before the Revolution and having unsuccessfully tried to discover where he came from. After discussing this, they agree that Ursa most likely hides in the catacombs under the Opéra de Paris. This episode also shows Darius' habit of making beverages out of moss and mold forms. In the next episode, "Saving Grace" (1993), Darius and MacLeod are in the middle of recreating the Battle of Gettysburg with toy soldiers when they are visited by fellow Immortal Grace Chandel (Julia Stemberger). Grace is harassed by Immortal Carlo Sendaro (Georges Corraface), who has stalked her ever since she left him decades ago. Darius offers to shelter Grace on holy ground in a convent, and even allows Grace and Sendaro to have a private conversation in his rectory. When Sendaro refuses to admit that Grace does not love him anymore, MacLeod fights him in a metro rail underground track where Sendaro falls accidentally due to an electric shock from the track that causes a train to run over him triggering a quickening which finds Macleod. This episode reveals the name of Darius' fictional church, St. Joseph Chapel.

The season finale episode "The Hunters" (1993) depicts Darius' death. At the beginning of the episode, MacLeod mentions to fellow Immortal Hugh Fitzcairn (Roger Daltrey) that Darius has premonitory dreams about his own death. In the meanwhile, Darius hears ominous-looking people enter his chapel. When Darius does not answer the phone, MacLeod and Fitzcairn rush to the chapel to find Darius' body in the messy nave. MacLeod searches Darius' rectory and remembers various moments with Darius until he finds Darius' last clue: an old book wrapped in old Clan MacLeod tartan cloth. Darius' murderers kidnap Fitzcairn and thwart MacLeod's investigations. Following one of them, MacLeod eventually reaches their headquarters. He meets their leader, renegade Watcher James Horton (Peter Hudson), who believes all Immortals to be threats to mankind and considers Darius "a malignant evil that has walked this earth in the form of a man for the last two thousand years." MacLeod fights them, but Horton escapes. After setting Fitzcairn free, they return to the barge and along with Tessa and Richie scatter Darius' ashes in the Seine River while MacLeod says, "Fifteen hundred years ago, you led an army of barbarians to the gates of Paris. You disbanded your army, and spared the city, but you broke a promise to yourself - to march west from the Ural mountains until you'd reached the sea. So now, old friend, travel on. Go where you never went, to the sea. I'll miss you."

In the season two pilot episode "The Watchers" (1993), MacLeod returns to Seacouver to find Darius' murderer. A clue written by Darius on the old book hidden in the rectory leads MacLeod to a bookshop in which Joe Dawson (Jim Byrnes) works. After MacLeod gets rid of some Hunters, Dawson reveals to MacLeod the existence of a secret organization called the Watchers, that observes Immortals and records their lives without interfering. Dawson tells MacLeod, "Darius? The great general who became a monk? I hope the immortal who killed him rots in hell." Dawson cannot believe the existence of the Hunters, a group of rogue Watchers dedicated to killing all Immortals: "We would have never hurt Darius. He was one of our great hopes." Dawson admits this when he surprises Horton armed with an axe and a gun, waiting for MacLeod. MacLeod finally stabs Horton with his sword.

Cover of Highlander book Shadow of Obsession

=== Highlander novels ===
Darius is a character in the Highlander novel Shadow of Obsession (1998) by Rebecca Neason. The story is set in the present (January 1996), when Darius is already dead. MacLeod returns to Seacouver from Sudan, where for nearly three months he has been helping Darius' protégé, Victor Paulus and his lover, Immortal Cynthia VanDervane. Then the story goes on from Cynthia's point of view, when she recalls how she had loved Darius in 409. When Alaric I was king of the Visigoths, she was his sister, then called Callestina, Darius his general and Grayson, Darius' second-in-command. While they prepared to invade Rome, Cynthia became Darius' lover and stayed so until the following year when the two armies sacked Rome, at which point Darius made clear he never loved her. Then Darius and Grayson left Rome to head north and reached Paris. There Darius fought Emrys, the oldest immortal at the time, and beheaded him. The power of love in Emrys' Quickening changed Darius completely and he decided to be a peacemaker. Grayson could not understand this and turned on his teacher. He left Darius and joined Cynthia so that they could destroy Darius' work. Back in the present, MacLeod is unsuccessful at preventing Cynthia from killing Paulus, and he fights and beheads her.

== Characteristics ==
In Highlander: The Series, Darius is portrayed as tall and thin and always wearing "a rough Franciscan-like robe with a cowl". The Watcher Chronicles - a collection of character profiles available as a CD-ROM and as bonus material of the Highlander: The Series DVD edition - describes him as "not the oldest or strongest, [but], perhaps, the wisest. His genius lay not just in the military arts, but in his knowledge of the contents of the human heart." Darius always understands people. His former friend and student Grayson admits that Darius is "a man of (...) insight into a person's soul."

As a general of Late Antiquity, he is described as selfish, manipulative and cynical, a skilled commander and an accomplished strategist. In Shadow of Obsession, Grayson remarks, "The whole world is just a plaything to Darius." Darius despises mortals : "They are born, they love, they fight, they die - and we go on." Darius is nevertheless a beloved general. He "always understood what his men needed - he knew them better than they knew themselves."

After his change of life, Darius has accepted his violent past, because "to deny what I was is to deny what I am." He still enjoys martial pastimes such as chess and recreating famous battles such as Gettysburg. In "Saving Grace", MacLeod tells him, "You may be a priest, but you still think like a warrior." Darius considers that "war, in the abstract, is a great intellectual puzzle, but in reality it's all blood and tears."

As a peacemaker, Darius is described as loving and compassionate. The Watcher Chronicle observes, "there is a quality in the man that I've seen in no other, a sense of peace - perhaps even a sense of God." In Shadow of Obsession, Joe Dawson states, "All the reports mention the sense of sanctity, the aura of peace that surrounded him." Darius considers peace the highest human value and is always shocked and saddened by unnecessary death. The script of "Band of Brothers" has him say: "In the face of violence, we must insist on nonviolence... Weapons have no dominion over the souls of men. Put your weapons down." He is actively involved in promoting and maintaining peace, "preaching his message to those who would become the peacemakers of their own generations," such as Victor Paulus. He also uses less obvious means such as using MacLeod (who has not rejected violence) to protect Paulus, or planting a spy in Grayson's organization.

To help mankind to fight violence, he has studied Buddhism and Hinduism and is now a Roman Catholic priest of the Franciscan Brothers of the Poor. However, Darius believes more in the spirit than in the letter of dogmas. MacLeod says of him, "I don't think Darius believes in religion or a set of rules, [but in] being your brother's keeper. I think Darius, if he has to help mankind, he has to honor their codes."

== Character development ==
Darius was originally intended as a mentor for MacLeod. Executive Producer Bill Panzer explains, "Duncan MacLeod needed somebody to talk to, who was Immortal, who was significantly older than he was, and with whom he had some kind of epiphany-like experience in the past." In this respect, Panzer compares Darius to Ramirez, Connor MacLeod's mentor in Highlander. Creative Consultant David Abramowitz recounts, "We wanted to create a character who was once a warrior, who gave up warfare because he realized there were other things in life."

The script of "Band of Brothers" describes Darius as a monk with a "hideously ugly face", but when the producers cast the part, they chose German actor Werner Stocker, who did not fit this description. Abramowitz explains, "Darius, originally in the script, was written as almost to look like the Hunchback of Notre Dame, to be physically ugly and with a glorious soul. And when I got to France, I noticed that they cast this young, handsome German actor named Werner Stocker. I said, 'Wait a minute. What's going on here? He's supposed to be ugly.' And it seemed that the Germans, who were putting up a great deal of money, didn't want the only German actor in the show to be ugly; so he wasn't ugly. And this was one of the cases where politics won out and it didn't hurt anything."

Panzer comments on Stocker's performance as Darius, "He had a kind of tranquility, but yet you believed that he could have been a great and brutal warrior." Abramowitz states, "He had an elegance, presence, and I was happy with the episode ["Band of Brothers"]." Associate Creative Consultant Gillian Horvath says, "Werner Stocker brought a lot to that role." The promotional booklet reports that Darius was "played with soulful grace by (...) Stocker. Stocker was an instant hit with fans."

Despite his limited number of appearances, the character of Darius has an important moral influence in the show. Horvath remarks, "When he joined the show it was the first time that someone started talking about peace." She explains, "The arrival of Darius, aside from bringing in a great character, represented the first time that someone questioned the basic premise of the show. The basic premise is that [MacLeod]'s a hero and he goes around kicking the ass of the bad guys. Now you have this character in Darius who shows up and says, 'Yes, but is it actually a good goal to kick the ass of the bad guys?' Even though Mac has to be a good guy who has to fight the bad guys, you set up this scenario where one of his closest friends has questioned whether beating up bad guys makes you a good guy or whether you should be a man of peace. (...) That underlying question shaped the whole rest of the series." Abramowitz says further, "It was a major moment for MacLeod. And it was the first time for him when he believed that the way of the warrior may not be the only way." Abramowitz summarizes, "Darius was the voice of God on the show, and then God died."

Associate Creative Consultant Donna Lettow says about Darius' character development, "It was always planned that Darius would die in [the season one episode] "The Hunters". The original plan for Darius was that he would reappear in flashbacks, much like Fitzcairn does now." Stocker's illness in early 1993 prevented this. Panzer remembers that Stocker "had announced that he had a brain tumor." The season 1 promotional booklet recounts, "Just days before going into production [of "The Hunters"] actor Werner Stocker was stricken ill and was unable to work. By now the character of Darius had become an integral part of the story and the writers had to scramble to adjust the story line." Abramowitz recalls, "I got a call at three o'clock in the morning, saying Werner would not be available, we were shooting in a day and a half, and there was fear if we were going to have to shut down. I went into work, wrote twenty-five straight hours, without a break, and got out a script and the show went on and it turned out pretty well." This script bears the date March 15, 1993. The production crew, too, had to adapt to the situation. The promotional booklet reports, "Footage from previous episodes was successfully used to fill in for the absent actor." Stocker died on May 27, 1993. The episodes "Unholy Alliance" and "Unholy Alliance Part Two" are dedicated to him.

The consequences of those unexpected events are described in the promotional booklet : "The season finale went on to mark a huge shift in the Highlander saga, forever altering the future of the series with the introduction of "Hunters" and "Watchers"." The Watchers, a secret organization of mortals watching Immortals without interfering, appears in this episode for the first time and is featured in all subsequent Highlander series and movies, and Watcher Joe Dawson would become one of the main characters of the Highlander franchise.

Also, Darius' death would leave the show without a moral figure. This, Horvath explains, led the creative staff "to create wise, advisor-type characters to fill the void in MacLeod's life left by the death of Darius." Darius was the first thousands-years-old Immortal featured in the show. In this sense, Abramowitz states, "Darius was a forerunner to Methos, which is why we took Methos in a totally different direction."
