= Highlander: The Series season 2 =

Highlander: The Series
- Season 2
- DVD box set
- No. of episodes: 22

Release
- Original network: Syndication
- Original release: September 27, 1993 – May 23, 1994

Season chronology
- ← Previous; Season 1 Next → Season 3

The second season of the international fantasy series Highlander: The Series, part of the Highlander franchise, consists of 22 episodes produced between 1993 and 1994. The first episode of the season aired on September 27, 1993 in broadcast syndication and the last aired on May 23, 1994. The series continues to follow the adventures of Duncan MacLeod, a 400-year-old Immortal who can only die if he is beheaded. MacLeod is involved in the Game, an ongoing battle during which all Immortals have to behead each other until only one is left.

A number of changes affected the cast as well as the co-production agreement that financed the previous season. Ratings increased, but Highlander received criticism for being too violent. The season was released on DVD in Region 1 on July 29, 2003 by Anchor Bay Entertainment. As of October 2025, it is also available on the streaming services Prime Video and Peacock.

== Production ==
The first season aired earlier in the United States than elsewhere, thus in early 1993, Rysher TPE, the distributor that had sold the series to the American market, had to make a decision about financing a new season. At this point, the European partners still had not aired the first season, so the decision fell to Rysher. Willing to take the risk, Rysher announced that it would produce a second season. The France/Canada co-production agreement of the previous season was reconstituted, albeit with some different partners. Gaumont Television (France), Rysher TPE (United States) and Reteitalia (Italy) agreed to renew their participation to a new season. French leading channel TF1 was forced to cancel its participation because it was no longer legally allowed to qualify a show filmed in English as French content, and was replaced by French smaller channel M6, which was still allowed to do so. RTL Plus (Germany) and Amuse Video (Japan) were also no longer part of the co-production, but Gaumont Television president Christian Charret signed Filmline International (Canada) as a new partner. As a result of this new co-production agreement, with less wealthy partners, the budget of the season decreased from US$26.1 million the previous year to $22 million. Half of the funding came from French and other European sources; income per episode from international sales, which had reached $800,000 in the previous season, decreased as well. According to The Hollywood Reporter, pre-production started in April 1993, and filming in June the same year. Like the first season, the second season was divided into two segments; the first segment was filmed in Vancouver, British Columbia, Canada (as the fictional city of Seacouver, Washington, United States), and the second in Paris, France, to secure an acceptable share of European content as part of the co-production agreement. Creatively, the second season was intended to be more action-oriented than the first, but lead actor Adrian Paul refused to do "another kung fu series", insisting that more romance and history be brought in the scripts.

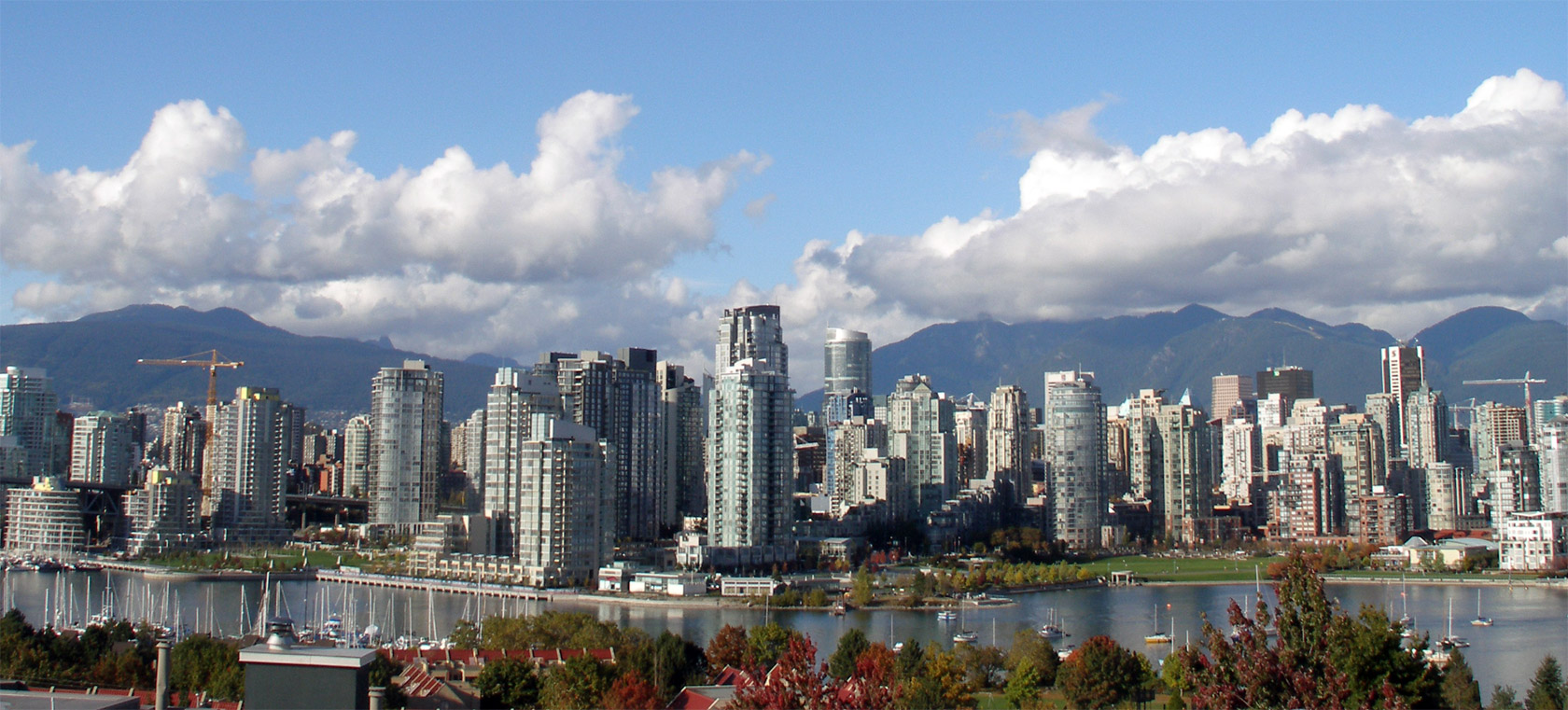
The first segment of the season was filmed in Vancouver, British Columbia, Canada

The production staff underwent a number of changes following the reshaping of the co-production partnership. Bill Panzer, Peter S. Davis, Christian Charret and Gaumont co-production executive Marla Ginsburg were executive producers. Filmline president Nicolas Clermont became the only co-executive producer. Ken Gord replaced Barry Rosen and Gary Goodman as the new producer. Former executives in charge of production, Marc du Pontavice and Denis Leroy, returned as associate producer and coordinating producer respectively. David Abramowitz served as head writer, but he could not be credited as such because Highlander was a Canadian-based show, and only Canadian writers could author scripts; Abramowitz was American, and thus was credited as creative consultant instead. The executive script editor was David Tynan, who also contributed scripts along staff and freelance writers, Brad Wright among the latter. Brent Karl Clackson was the line producer in Vancouver, but was succeeded by Patrick Millet (with the title of production manager) on the Paris segment. Regular directors throughout the season were Clay Borris and Dennis Berry. Fencing coach Bob Anderson, who coined for himself the title of Master of Swords, resumed his work from the third episode onwards, after David Boushey choreographed the fights of episode two. The opening theme was "Princes of the Universe" from the 1986 album A Kind of Magic by Queen; incidental music was composed by Roger Bellon.

== Cast ==
The main cast also underwent substantial changes during the season. Adrian Paul (Duncan MacLeod) and Stan Kirsch (playing Richie Ryan, the quick-talking street punk) returned to play their characters, but Alexandra Vandernoot who had portrayed Tessa Noël, the French artist, decided to leave the show. Vandernoot only appeared in (and had star billing for) the first four episodes of the season, and her character was killed in the fourth episode "The Darkness". She did, however, return to make a guest appearance as the murderer Lisa Halle, in the two-part season finale "Counterfeit".

Jim Byrnes was introduced as MacLeod's Watcher, Joe Dawson, in the season's first episode "The Watchers". The Watchers are members of a secret society that observes Immortals without interfering in the Game. Another new actor Philip Akin had star billing in episodes three to fifteen playing Charlie DeSalvo, a martial arts teacher and ex-Navy SEAL. MacLeod buys and lives in DeSalvo's dojo after Tessa's death. Akin was replaced in the main cast when production moved to Paris for the second segment. Michel Modo took Akin's place, acting as Maurice Lalonde, an unemployed former chef living next to MacLeod's barge, and had star billing in episodes sixteen to twenty-two. (Note: Modo had already appeared as Maurice in "Unholy Alliance Part Two", credited as a guest actor.)

Actors returning to play recurring characters included: Elizabeth Gracen as Amanda, an international thief; Roland Gift as Xavier St. Cloud, a hedonistic killer; and Peter Hudson as James Horton, Dawson's brother-in-law and leader of the Hunters, a group of renegade Watchers who believe Immortals must be eliminated. New recurring characters introduced in the season were: Immortal baseball player Carl Robinson, portrayed by Bruce A. Young; CID Special Agent Renee Delaney, played by Stacey Travis; and Immortal mentor Rebecca Horne, played by Nadia Cameron.

== Reception ==
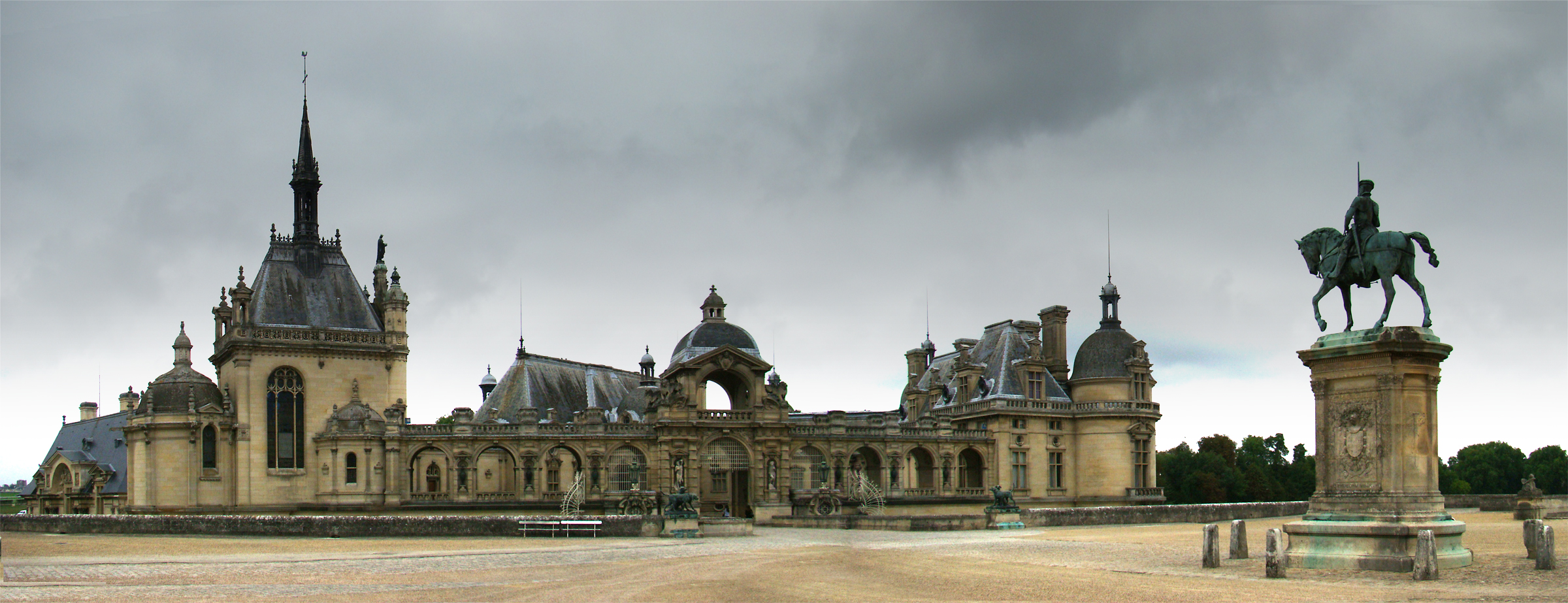
The twentieth episode, "Prodigal Son", was partially filmed at the Château de Chantilly, 38 km (23.6 mi) north of Paris, France

During the 1993 November sweeps period, 4.1 percent of viewers aged 18 to 49 watched the episode, representing a 17 percent gain from the previous year's ratings, which scored 3.5. The household average for all dayparts scored 2.7/9. This means that an average of 2.7 percent of viewers aged 18 to 49, as well as 9 percent of all viewers watching television at the time, watched each episode during the sweeps. This represented an increase of 40 to 50 percent of the series' share of key demographic rating groups. Ratings reached 4.6 during the 1994 February sweeps.

Rick Sanchez of IGN wrote that the pilot episode "The Watchers" demonstrated "a huge leap in quality and style for the show that just keeps getting better and better by episode" and that "Season Two pretty much surpasses Season One in every way imaginable." Sanchez gave the season an overall rating of 8 out of 10. Two episodes were nominated for the 1994 Golden Reel Awards in the One Hour Series category: "The Darkness" for sound editing, and "The Zone" for ADR editing.

A February 1994 study by Samuel Robert Lichter, president of the Center for Media and Public Affairs, found that the second season of Highlander was the most violent syndicated show of the 1993-1994 season. According to it, there were 31 scenes of violence in the premiere episode. Charret also admitted the series received adverse criticism for being too violent. Abramowitz disagreed that Highlander was violent and stressed that staff writers "work very hard at having MacLeod not take pleasure in causing death." Gord pointed out the non-graphic nature of violence in the show and likened Immortals to vampire mythology, saying, "The vampire sucks some blood and you stick him through the heart with a stake and nobody takes that seriously." Steven Maier, executive financial consultant on the second season, noted that the beheadings in Highlander might make the show look "extremely violent", but insisted that violence could be depicted in "non-graphic ways" and was "highly stylized" in Highlander.

== Episodes ==
No. overall	No. in season	Title	Directed by	Written by	Original release date	Prod. code
23	1	"The Watchers"	Clay Borris	Marie-Chantal Droney	September 27, 1993	93201-23
Duncan, Tessa and Richie settle back into the antique shop in the United States. Following a clue written by Darius on the Fifth Chronicle, Duncan finds Horton's bookshop and meets Joe Dawson, Horton's daughter Lynn (Kehli O'Byrne) and her fiancé Robert (Cameron Bancroft). Joe explains all about the Watchers to Duncan, who follows Joe to find Horton. When Robert considers leaving the Hunters because Duncan spared his life, Horton kills Robert. Accompanied by Joe and Lynn, Duncan confronts Horton, who admits to killing Darius and Robert. Horton shoots Duncan dead, but Duncan is able to stab him. When Duncan revives, Joe, Horton and Lynn have disappeared.
24	2	"Studies in Light"	Peter Ellis	Naomi Janzen	October 4, 1993	93202-24
Duncan, Tessa and Richie visit the photograph exhibition of Duncan's friend Gregor Powers (Joel Wyner). There MacLeod meets Linda Plager (Sheila Moore), who was his lover in 1938 and is now an old, frail lady. While Duncan ponders whether he will tell Linda about his immortality, Powers nearly kills Richie trying to make Richie show some fear of death. Duncan realizes Powers has seen too many people die and is now desperate and nihilistic. Duncan pretends to behead him to make him feel fear again. Later, Duncan reveals his immortality to Linda as she lies dying.
25	3	"Turnabout"	Clay Borris	David Tynan	October 11, 1993	93203-25
Immortal Michael Moore (Geraint Wyn Davies) visits Duncan for help because Moore's nemesis Quenten Barnes has reappeared. Duncan helps Moore to track Barnes, but nobody, including Moore, realizes that Barnes is actually Moore's alternate, evil personality. Tessa attracts Barnes's interest, and he nearly strangles her before Duncan intervenes. Duncan and Moore eventually realize the truth, and as Moore begs Duncan to kill him so that Barnes dies, Duncan beheads Moore.
26	4	"The Darkness"	Paolo Barzman	Christian Bouveron & Lawrence Shore	October 18, 1993	93204-26
Duncan and Tessa spend the evening in a gypsy cafe where small-time psychic Greta (Traci Lords) tells Tessa to leave the city because she is in danger. Then Tessa is kidnapped by Pallin Wolf (Andrew Jackson), a Hunter who uses mortals as bait to kill Immortals in a dark room using night vision goggles. Duncan enlists Greta's help and finally locates Wolf's house. Duncan kills Wolf and frees Tessa with Richie and tells them to go out while he searches Wolf's house; there Tessa and Richie are shot dead by a drug addict mugging for money. While Richie revives, becoming Immortal, Tessa dies. Duncan is devastated and asks Richie to sell everything; leaving the antique shop, car and his former life behind.
27	5	"Eye For An Eye"	Dennis Berry	Elizabeth Baxter and Martin Broussellet	October 25, 1993	93205-27
Duncan buys Charlie DeSalvo's dojo to live in and asks Charlie to run it for him. Richie attracts the ire of Immortal Annie Devlin (Sheena Easton) by foiling her attempt at a terror attack against the British Consulate. Duncan trains Richie at swordsmanship and tries to convince Devlin not to fight Richie, but fails. Richie eventually wins his fight against Devlin, but refuses to behead her. Duncan presents Richie with a Spanish rapier.
28	6	"The Zone"	Clay Borris	Peter Mohan	November 1, 1993	93206-28
Joe asks Duncan to see if Canaan (Santino Buda), the leader of the derelict neighborhood called the Zone, is an Immortal. Duncan enters the Zone with Charlie, who has grown up there. Duncan realizes Canaan is mortal and decides to end his rule. Duncan and Charlie gather the inhabitants of the Zone, but Canaan comes to the meeting with his men. Duncan and Charlie fight them and stop Canaan.
29	7	"The Return of Amanda"	Dennis Berry	Story by Guy Mullaly; teleplay by David Tynan	November 8, 1993	93207-29
In 1936 in Berlin, Germany, Amanda steals money plates while Duncan tries to smuggle scientist Lev Arkin (Michael Puttonen) to England. When Duncan's contact Werner (Robert Wisden) betrays him, Duncan has no choice but to trust Amanda to fly Arkin away while he escapes on road. In the present, Amanda is wanted by the FBI. Duncan quickly figures out that Amanda wants to counterfeit money with the old plates, but so does Special Agent Palance (Don S. Davis), who blackmails them into giving him the plates before shooting them dead. Duncan and Amanda revive shortly after, and Palance is arrested thanks to Richie who has filmed the whole scene.
30	8	"Revenge of the Sword"	Clay Borris	Aubrey Solomon	November 15, 1993	93208-30
Charlie's young friend Jimmy Song (Dustin Nguyen) films a kung fu movie in the dojo. As a stuntman is poisoned and the set is vandalized, it becomes clear that someone wants to stop the production. Duncan reluctantly agrees to protect the young, arrogant star. Duncan discovers Jimmy used to work for underground boss Johnny Leong (Robert Ito) and revealed Leong's gang activities in the movie script. Jimmy decides to kill Leong himself, but he is overpowered by Leong's men. Duncan fights them and frees Jimmy.
31	9	"Run For Your Life"	Dennis Berry	Naomi Janzen	November 22, 1993	93209-31
In 1926, Duncan saved Immortal Carl Robinson from white supremacist lynchers in Louisiana. In the present, Carl is chased by racist policeman Carter (Geza Kovacs) who turns out to be a Hunter determined to kill him. Duncan helps Carl overcome his hate against racists and ambush Carter. Carl then resumes his baseball career and plans to become a politician. Jim Byrnes wrote and sang the song 'Jack Of Diamonds'.
32	10	"Epitaph for Tommy"	Clay Borris	Philip John Taylor	November 29, 1993	93210-32
Duncan is challenged by Immortal Anthony Gallen (Roddy Piper), but their fight is interrupted by Tommy Bannen, who is killed by Gallen. Duncan meets Tommy's mother (Jan D'Arcy) at the funeral and, touched by her grief, investigates Tommy's employers Mike Honniger (Ken Camroux) and his daughter Suzanne (Andrea Roth). Duncan discovers that Tommy had been hired by Mike to kill Gallen. Gallen and his lover Suzanne want to take over Mike's company; they kill Mike, then Gallen kills Suzanne and fights Duncan, who beheads him.
33	11	"The Fighter"	Peter Ellis	Morrie Ruvinsky	January 31, 1994	93211-33
In 1891, Tommy Sullivan (Bruce Weitz) talked Duncan into a prizefight against the local boxing champion, which Duncan won, despite the intervention of the police. Sullivan then killed promoter Wilson (Russell Roberts) to recover the one thousand dollars of the prize. In the present, Sullivan is training George Belcher (Wren Robertz) and trying to go out with Iris (Cali Timmins), a maid at the bar owned by promoter Frank Coleman (Tom McBeath). Sullivan kills Coleman when he tries to buy George, then he kills George for betraying him. Duncan decides that his friend has gone too far, challenges him and beheads him.
34	12	"Under Color of Authority"	Clay Borris	Peter Mohan	February 7, 1994	93212-34
Richie saves Laura Daniels (Deanna Milligan) from Immortal bounty hunter Mako (Jonathan Banks). Duncan remembers how Mako had killed his friend Tim Ramsey (Lochlyn Munro) in 1882 because he put the letter before the spirit of the law. Mako will not let Laura go, for she has accidentally killed her violent husband, so Richie ignores Duncan's advice and flees with Laura. Mako chases them and hits Laura with his car, killing her. An enraged Richie attacks Mako and beheads him. Duncan tells Richie to leave the city.
35	13	"Bless the Child"	Clay Borris	Elizabeth Baxter and Martin Broussellet	February 14, 1994	93213-35
While camping in the mountains, Duncan and Charlie meet Sara Lightfoot (Michelle Thrush) and baby Jamie, who are fleeing the Hoskins family. Duncan and Charlie help Sara escape across the mountains, but Duncan's growing suspicions that Sara is not the mother of Jamie are eventually confirmed. While Duncan goes to talk to Avery Hoskins (Ed Lauter), who agrees to end the feud peacefully, Avery's brother Billy (Jon Cuthbert) drops to the rocky edge where Charlie, Sara and Jamie are hiding and falls to his death. Sara agrees to give Jamie back to his father.
36	14	"Unholy Alliance, Part 1"	Peter Ellis	David Tynan	February 21, 1994	93214-36
Xavier St. Cloud employs mercenaries to behead fellow Immortals. Joe warns Duncan and Duncan and Charlie barely escape Xavier's attack unscathed. Duncan meets CID Special Agent Renee Delaney, who is investigating Xavier. Despite Duncan's warnings, Charlie insists on following him. Duncan punches Charlie so that he does not witness Duncan's fight with Xavier, but Charlie sees Horton shoot Duncan in the chest, before getting shot himself. Horton and his Hunters turn out to be Xavier's associates. Duncan breaks into the Dawson family crypt to find Horton's grave empty and is infuriated to find that Joe knew that Horton was alive.
37	15	"Unholy Alliance, Part 2"	Peter Ellis	David Tynan	February 28, 1994	93215-37
Charlie is slowly recovering and demands to know how Duncan could survive several shots in the chest, which Duncan says "is magic." Duncan is followed by Special Agent Delaney on his way to Paris, where Xavier and Horton have fled. After Delaney is shot in the arm by one of Horton's men, Joe finally shoots Horton. Duncan uses his new neighbour Maurice's help to find Xavier's address, fights Xavier and beheads him. As Duncan and Delaney kiss goodbye, an angry Horton watches them in the background.
38	16	"The Vampire"	Dennis Berry	J.P. Couture	March 7, 1994	93216-38
In 1840, Duncan was doing business in Paris with merchantmen Henry Jacom (Trevor Peacock) and William Stillwell (Peter Vizard). Stillwell is seemingly killed by a vampire. Duncan realizes Immortal Nicholas Ward (Jeremy Brudenell) is Juliette Jacom's (Tonya Kinzinger) fiancee. After the "vampire" kills Henry Jacom and vampire hunter Alan Baines (Denis Lill), Duncan challenges Ward, but their fight is interrupted. In the present, Duncan's friend Helene Piper (Nathalie Presles), who is Ward's lover, mourns her father, and as her producer Peter Wells (Jack Galloway) is killed too, Duncan recognizes Ward's modus operandi. He challenges Ward and beheads him.
39	17	"Warmonger"	Bruno Gantillon	Christian Bouveron and Lawrence Shore	March 14, 1994	93217-39
Immortal Arthur Drake (Peter Firth) kills President Chescu (André Oumansky). Duncan prevents Eli Jarmel (Tom Watson) from killing Drake, who killed Eli's family years ago. Eli is gravely wounded in his second attempt at killing Drake, but Duncan refuses to intervene because he has promised not to fight Drake in 1919 after Drake let his lover Katerina (Anna Miasedova) and her family live. Before dying, Eli says Duncan's keeping his word is only vanity. Duncan changes his mind, fights Drake and beheads him.
40	18	"Pharaoh's Daughter"	Dennis Berry	Christian Bouveron and Lawrence Shore	April 25, 1994	93218-40
Duncan frees fellow Immortal Nefertiri (Nia Peeples) from her sarcophagus where she has spent 2,000 years. They are followed by Immortal Marcus Constantine (James Faulkner), who had been Nefertiri's lover in 30 BC, before Nefertiri committed suicide because Rome had conquered Egypt. Defiant at first, Duncan realizes that Constantine is genuinely prepared to make peace with Nefertiri; but Nefertiri never forgave Constantine for conquering Egypt and kills Constantine's wife Angela (Diana Bellego). Constantine refuses to defend himself when she challenges him, so Duncan fights and beheads her.
41	19	"Legacy"	Dennis Berry	Elizabeth Baxter	May 2, 1994	93219-41
Luther (Emile Abossolo M'Bo) beheads fellow Immortal Rebecca Horne (Nadia Cameron), his and Amanda's teacher. Amanda comes to Duncan for help and they find out that Luther gathers the crystal parts that Rebecca gave each of her students, with the belief that the whole crystal will make him invincible. Amanda challenges Luther to avenge Rebecca's death. Luther is about to behead Amanda when Duncan stops him by producing the crystal he has taken from Luther's men. Luther renounces to behead Amanda and fights Duncan instead. Duncan beheads him and gives the crystal to Amanda.
42	20	"Prodigal Son"	Paolo Barzman	David Tynan	May 9, 1994	93220-42
Richie joins Duncan in Paris because he is being chased by Immortal Martin Hyde (Michael Siberry), who wants Duncan's head. Duncan remembers how Hyde had hunted him the same way to find Connor MacLeod in 1690. As Hyde frames Richie for the murders he has committed himself, Duncan realizes he cannot behead Hyde right now if he wants Richie to get out of jail. Duncan tricks Hyde into confessing the murders when police are listening, resulting in Hyde faking his own death by falling off a roof. With Richie now free, Duncan fights Hyde and beheads him.
43	21	"Counterfeit, Part 1"	Paolo Barzman	Story by David Tynan; teleplay by Brad Wright	May 16, 1994	93221-43
Horton, now obsessed with killing Duncan, sets up an elaborate trap to kill him. Horton uses Pete Wilder (Martin Cummins) to befriend Richie and make Duncan suspicious, spreading discord between them. In the meanwhile he has murderer Lisa Halle (Meilani Paul) kidnapped and her appearance modified through plastic surgery to make her look like Tessa. Horton's men follow Pete to Duncan's barge and kill him under Duncan's and Richie's eyes.
44	22	"Counterfeit, Part 2"	Dennis Berry	David Tynan	May 23, 1994	93222-44
Horton uses Lisa (now played by Alexandra Vandernoot) as bait to trap Duncan. Duncan meets Lisa at Pete's burial and half believes he has found Tessa again, missing her as much as he does. While he is eagerly pursuing a relationship with her, Richie and Joe express concern about his behavior as well as at the fact that Horton might have resurfaced. Duncan accepts the truth when he discovers a scar on Lisa's jaw. Duncan confronts Lisa at the cemetery, and Horton kills her on Tessa's grave. Enraged, Duncan finally kills Horton, avenging Darius and Lisa. Now at peace with Tessa's death, Duncan leaves Paris with Richie.

== Home media ==
Highlander: The Series Season Two
Set details	Special features
22 episodes; 8-disc set (7 DVDs and 1 CD-ROM); 1.33:1 aspect ratio; English (Dolby Digital 5.1); English (Dolby Digital 2.0 Stereo)	Adrian Paul audio and video commentary on "The Return of Amanda" and "Revenge of the Sword"; Bill Panzer and/or David Abramowitz commentary on all episodes; Lost scenes; "Watcher Chronicles" : character profiles; Scripts of all episodes; Director and actor biographies; Shooting schedules of "Studies in Light", "Turnabout" and "Unholy Alliance"; Trivia game; Photo gallery
Release dates	Adrian Paul audio and video commentary on "The Return of Amanda" and "Revenge of the Sword"; Bill Panzer and/or David Abramowitz commentary on all episodes; Lost scenes; "Watcher Chronicles" : character profiles; Scripts of all episodes; Director and actor biographies; Shooting schedules of "Studies in Light", "Turnabout" and "Unholy Alliance"; Trivia game; Photo gallery
Region 1	Adrian Paul audio and video commentary on "The Return of Amanda" and "Revenge of the Sword"; Bill Panzer and/or David Abramowitz commentary on all episodes; Lost scenes; "Watcher Chronicles" : character profiles; Scripts of all episodes; Director and actor biographies; Shooting schedules of "Studies in Light", "Turnabout" and "Unholy Alliance"; Trivia game; Photo gallery
July 29, 2003	Adrian Paul audio and video commentary on "The Return of Amanda" and "Revenge of the Sword"; Bill Panzer and/or David Abramowitz commentary on all episodes; Lost scenes; "Watcher Chronicles" : character profiles; Scripts of all episodes; Director and actor biographies; Shooting schedules of "Studies in Light", "Turnabout" and "Unholy Alliance"; Trivia game; Photo gallery
