= Charlie DeSalvo =

Fictional character

- Highlander character
- First appearance: "Turnabout"
- Portrayed by: Philip Akin

In-universe information
- Born: July 7, 1956

Charlie DeSalvo is a fictional character from Highlander: The Series, portrayed by actor Philip Akin. A martial artist and former Navy SEAL, he works with and befriends the series protagonist Duncan MacLeod, an immortal swordsman from the Scottish Highlands. He was introduced in the third episode of the second season, "Turnabout", and was a recurring character throughout season two and three. Like MacLeod's allies Richie Ryan and Joe Dawson, Charlie often aided the Highlander in adventures where they attempted to protect people from criminals and evil forces. In the season four episode "Brothers in Arms", he appeared in his twelfth and final episode.

== Character background ==
Charlie is first introduced in the season two episode "Turnabout" (1993), as the owner of a martial arts dojo DeSalvo Martial Arts in the fictional city of Seacouver, Washington, United States. Charlie's background is revealed in pieces over several episodes. He grew up in a poor neighborhood nicknamed "the Zone", where residents (mostly of black or Italian descent) largely believe in taking care of their own "kind" and viewing others with suspicion. Growing up, Charlie is targeted by other children for being mixed race due to having a black mother and an Italian father. The script for "Run For Your Life" (1993) notes that Charlie's mixed heritage is "a thorny issue." Beaten up by both Italian and black kids in the neighborhood for not fully assimilating with either ethnicity, he later says he preferred not to spend time in the Zone when he had other options.

As a child, Charlie admires Muhammad Ali and wants to be like him. As an adult, Charlie becomes a Navy SEAL in 1977, serving for 12 years before returning to civilian life in Seacouver. Turning his martial arts skill into a trade as a teacher, he dreams about operating his own dojo one day. After five years of saving up his money, he has enough for a down payment on his own gym, turning it into DeSalvo Martial Arts.

Despite Charlie's efforts, the gym does not earn much profit and he is forced to look for a buyer for the property. In his debut episode "Turnabout," Charlie encounters the Scottish Highlander Duncan MacLeod (Adrian Paul) and his friend Richie Ryan (Stan Kirsch), not knowing they are both immortal warriors. Initially telling them membership is closed, he changes his mind after MacLeod beats him in a martial arts sparring match. Weeks later, MacLeod purchases the dojo. In "Eye For An Eye" (1993), Charlie is surprised to learn MacLeod wants him to remain as manager, a position he accepts. Charlie then becomes the coach and sparring partner of Richie, focusing on sword combat.

Charlie comes to regard MacLeod and Richie as friends, and also becomes friendly with Joe Dawson, owner of Joe's Blues Bar and secretly a Watcher who monitors immortals and aids the Highlander at times. Charlie is grateful to MacLeod for keeping the dojo operational and not simply selling it, despite its low profits. At the same time, he is aware MacLeod keeps much hidden, saying, "When I was in the SEALS, I saw guys with eyes like yours. The lifers, the ones who'd got in too many battles and never came all the way back... One day I'm gonna find out what you're all about." Charlie eventually becomes openly frustrated with MacLeod's secrecy, remarking, "You always say it's nothing and it's always something."

In "The Zone" (1993), MacLeod decides to enter the Zone for his own agenda and Charlie insists on accompanying him, despite knowing it will trigger painful memories. After seeing Zone crime leader Canaan (Santino Buda) giving guns to boys, Charlie rallies several residents to defy him, saying "I know you're afraid. That's what this is all about. You don't have to be afraid... You make the choices, not him."

In "Revenge of the Sword" (1993), Charlie's former pupil Jimmy Sang (Dustin Nguyen) is filming part of a movie in the dojo. Jimmy gives Charlie a small role in the film and then asks him to come to Los Angeles for more stunt work and other opportunities. Realizing he does not need wealth or to own his own business to feel accomplished, Charlie says, "I like where I am."

In "Unholy Alliance" (1994), the immortal Xavier St. Cloud (Roland Gift) and his mercenaries storm the dojo to kill MacLeod while Charlie is there, firing guns that cause extensive damage. Failing, the men flee. MacLeod arranges for the dojo to be repaired using his considerable wealth, but an enraged Charlie wants to help track down Xavier and his mercenaries, particularly when he learns they killed a man he used to serve with. Charlie later sees MacLeod engage in a sword fight with Xavier and then suffer lethal gunshot wounds. Charlie is then shot himself and later wakes up in the hospital to see MacLeod alive and uninjured. He demands an explanation before he dies, but Duncan only hints it may involve magic (a nod to the line from the movie Highlander "it's a kind of magic" that inspired a Queen song of the same title). Charlie recovers and returns to the dojo while MacLeod tracks Xavier to Paris and kills him. He does not return to Seacouver until months later, during which time Charlie manages the dojo alone. Aware Duncan has strange abilities and hidden enemies, Charlie reluctantly accepts that he will not be told the whole truth, though still insists on helping when possible.

In the season three episode "The Revolutionary" (1994), Charlie falls in love with Balkan revolutionary Mara Leonin and decides to join her in her efforts to help her people. After he leaves, management of DeSalvo's Martial Arts passes to Richie Ryan. In the season four episode "Brothers in Arms", the arms dealer Andrew Cord kills Mara and Charlie follows the man back to Seacouver. Charlie does not realize that Andrew Cord is immortal and wants to fight him to the death in revenge. Joe Dawson, owing his life to Cord when they served together in Vietnam, asks that MacLeod allow the arms dealer to leave the city. He and MacLeod both warn Charlie that attacking Cord would be pointless and dangerous. Ignoring warnings, Charlie confronts Cord outside Joe's Blues Bar and is mortally wounded. Minutes later, MacLeod finds Charlie and realizes nothing can be done. Recalling Charlie asking to know the truth before he dies, Duncan reveals that he and Cord are both immortal. Realizing he would have never won a fight against such an opponent, Charlie dies in Duncan's arms. MacLeod then avenges him and Mara by killing Cord.

== Character development ==
Executive Producer Bill Panzer explains, "We realized that Alexandra Vandernoot, who played Tessa, wanted to return to Europe for personal reasons, and we thought MacLeod needed another mortal to talk to and to interact with... Charlie DeSalvo's character was a very good foil for Mac."

Charlie is described in the script of "Turnabout" as a black man in his late twenties and moving "like a street-tiger. His heritage is black-Italian: when black guys weren't beating on him for being Italian, the Italians stomped him for being in the wrong neighborhood. Fed up, Charlie took a stint as a Navy SEAL, and forged his street-moves into martial arts mastery. He's realized his dream of owning this dojo by hard work and sweat. He's friendly but tough as hell." The dojo is described in the script of "Turnabout" as "spare but clean: a testosterone-shop in the old style."

Actor Adrian Paul says about Philip Akin that Akin studied martial arts a lot and had a different style than his own. There also are several occurrences of MacLeod throwing Charlie hard on the mat in the series, and Paul comments that Akin "never liked the idea of me throwing him".

Charlie developed into a relatable character whose concerns were more grounded than the problems of being an ageless warrior, often telling MacLeod things that bordered between earnest insight and comic relief. He called himself a "liberated male" who had no problem caring for a baby, but refused to change diapers. He willingly put himself in danger against former marines and assassins to help MacLeod, but openly hated heights. His mixed heritage was a deep part of his identity. In "Bless the Child" (1994), Charlie remarks that he and Jamie Lightfoot, a child of mixed heritage, both have "something in common... We carry the blood of two different worlds." Likewise, family legacy was important to him. He tells MacLeod, "A man like you, I mean, you got to have a kid of your own, man. Someone to share things with, you know, to love, to teach all this stuff, you know? I mean, who can you pass that on to?"
