= Maurice Lalonde (Highlander) =

- Highlander character
- First appearance: "Unholy Alliance Part Two"
- Portrayed by: Michel Modo

In-universe information
- Born: 28 December 1938

Maurice Lalonde is a fictional character from Highlander: The Series, a mortal homeless cook portrayed by actor Michel Modo.

== Appearances ==
In "Unholy Alliance Part Two" (1994), Maurice is introduced as a homeless man squatting Duncan MacLeod's (Adrian Paul) barge. At first MacLeod throws him out and has him clean up the mess on the barge, but he soon finds Maurice's connections in the grande cuisine world of Paris useful when he tracks Xavier St. Cloud (Roland Gift) using his taste for golden caviar. Maurice uses all the money MacLeod gave him and comes back drunk, but with Xavier's address, allowing MacLeod to fight and behead Xavier.

In "Warmonger" (1994), while having a drink with MacLeod, Maurice muses, ignoring MacLeod's immortality: "Time comes for all of us, my friend. Kings, Queens and homeless alike. That's why a good bottle of wine... a good laugh with a friend is so precious. There's so little time to enjoy them. I don't think I would want to live forever... Would you ?"

In "Pharaoh's Daughter" (1994), Maurice takes an instant shine for two thousand-year-old Immortal Nefertiri (Nia Peeples). Although he is supposed to look after her, while having dinner with her he is knocked down unconscious by Hunter Victor Benedetti (Jerry di Giacomo) who is killed trying to murder Nefertiri.

In "Legacy" (1994), Maurice is pestering MacLeod about buying a truffle-hunting pig when Amanda (Elizabeth Gracen) comes to MacLeod for help. Maurice makes breakfast for her and looks after her while MacLeod is away.

In "Prodigal Son" (1994), Maurice welcomes Richie when he joins MacLeod in Paris. Maurice is approached by evil Immortal Martin Hyde (Michael Siberry), who wants MacLeod's head, and unwittingly discloses to him where MacLeod lives.

After sitting out the Canadian-shot episodes of the third season, Maurice rejoined the cast for the Paris episodes, covering episodes 15-21 ("Star-Crossed" through "Finale Part I"), including a featured part in "Reasonable Doubt". He made a final guest appearance in "The Modern Prometheus", the next-to-last episode of season five, though most of his part was cut.

== Characterization ==
Maurice owns a small boat "in a state of disrepair," the Momo, which is anchored next to MacLeod's barge. Maurice thinks of himself that "I don't like to boast, but I have exquisite taste." He pretends to have a great intuition: "Something's wrong. Don't say no, because I can tell. I'm very good at such things. It's about a woman," but is deceived as MacLeod answers that someone he knows is dying. He nevertheless insists that "there are two things that Maurice knows about. Food and love," and suggests to Amanda that she is in love with MacLeod. Maurice also has a great eye for the ladies and is once seen watching a near-naked Nefertiri through a porthole from outside the barge. Maurice likes to involve himself uninvited in other people's business and conversations and to supervise people, although he is usually entirely incompetent and other people do not acknowledge his leadership. Maurice thinks that "some people are born sailors, some are captains."

Maurice used to be a chef, "at Pyramide, under the great Fernand Point !" and does not like to be called a cook. Maurice boasts, "you should have tasted my oysters. This time of year they were magnificent. (...) Washed down with a crisp Sancerre, it's like heaven. (...) I can do things with shrimp you wouldn't believe." He also has "such difficulty talking on an empty stomach." Maurice is often seen in close vicinity of a wine bottle, cooking traditional French recipes such as coq au vin or otherwise enjoying goat cheese, viennoiseries and other kinds of food, including his own cooking, "with great gusto." Maurice drinks excessively, which sometimes gets him drunk or in other kinds of predicament: He was apparently fired from his job as a chef over "a few" bottles of wine that he allegedly "tasted" to use them in a new recipe of Boeuf a la Maurice. Maurice insists the sous chef was jealous and informed on him. On a related note, he has also occasional problems with Jean the bookmaker. Maurice was once falsely accused of stealing a chicken, because it was a duck he stole.

Maurice has a brother in Gascony who is involved in the truffle business. Maurice's first wife, Marcelle, and he used to fight all the time. Maurice comments he especially enjoyed the making up afterwards : "The greater the fight, the greater the passion."

== Concept ==
The script of "Unholy Alliance Part Two" (1994) describes Maurice as "a rubber-faced man in his forties," with a fondness for wine. Creative Consultant David Abramowitz explains, "As this was a French and Canadian co-production, we had to bring in a couple of French characters and we brought in wine-loving, fun-loving Maurice, which we took a lot of heat from the French, mostly because they weren't so crazy about having a wine-loving, fun-loving character and I guess they thought that the character we'd brought in to play Maurice, would have a lot more philosophical and intellectual questions to ask, rather than things like, 'I wonder what we're doing for dinner tonight ?'"
