= Maurice Lalonde =

Maurice Lalonde is the name of:

- Maurice Lalonde (politician) (1901-1956), member of Canadian Parliament
- Maurice Lalonde (Highlander character), a fictional person
