= Richie Ryan (Highlander) =

Fictional character in the television series Highlander: The Series

- Highlander character
- First appearance: "The Gathering"
- Last appearance: "Not to Be"
- Portrayed by: Stan Kirsch

In-universe information
- Born: September 20, 1974
- Teacher: Duncan MacLeod

Richie Ryan is a fictional character from Highlander: The Series, portrayed by actor Stan Kirsch. Introduced in the pilot episode "The Gathering" (1992) as a young, quick-talking petty thief, his life changes when he realizes the existence of immortals, people born with an energy called the Quickening that makes them ageless and invincible to injury after they experience the shock of a violent death. These immortals are unable to die permanently unless beheaded. Richie meets Duncan MacLeod (Adrian Paul), an immortal born centuries ago in the Scottish Highlands. He becomes an apprentice, friend and helper to Duncan and his mortal love Tessa Noël (Alexandra Vandernoot), often providing comic relief and youthful enthusiasm for their adventures.

Highlander: The Series ran for six seasons from 1992 to 1998. Starting in season 2, Richie is no longer a series regular and is instead a recurring character, becoming MacLeod's apprentice before leaving to pursue his own path, now a more cynical character. Richie officially leaves the show at the end of season 5 but appears in flashbacks in season 6 and then makes another appearance in the two-part series finale.

== Fictional biography ==
An orphan, Richie Ryan grows up in Seacouver, Washington. Initially, he believes he is the son of Emily Ryan, who died when he was four. After her death, he grows up in the foster care system, eventually becoming a sarcastic thief who believes in only looking out for himself and not others. He later learns that Emily Ryan was a foster mother herself and not his biological mother, leaving his true name and parentage a mystery. When he later meets Duncan MacLeod, he learns that the Highlander is also "a foundling" who never knew his true parents.

Weeks before his 18th birthday, Richie Ryan breaks into the shop Noël and MacLeod Antiques. The store owners Duncan MacLeod and Tessa Noël live on the property, and Duncan confronts Richie with a sword. The immortal villain Slan Quince arrives, whom MacLeod sensed, along with Duncan's former mentor Connor MacLeod. In the confusion, Richie flees but is arrested. The next morning, Duncan refuses to press charges, asking instead that Richie simply not share that he witnessed Duncan and Quince ready to duel with swords.

Richie follows Duncan, seeing him train with Connor and listening in on their conversations. He later witnesses Duncan behead Slan Quince in a duel and then absorb the dead man's energy and power. Realizing they've been witnessed, Connor tells Duncan to look after the young man. Duncan finds Richie and explains that he is an immortal, a rare person born with an energy called the Quickening that makes them ageless after experiencing the shock of a premature, violent death (their First Death). Only able to permanently die if beheaded, immortals can absorb the Quickening energy of another whom they kill. Some hunt others of their kind to increase their own power, a Game where the last survivor will have the collected power of all immortals who ever lived. "In the end, there can be only one."

Believing Richie simply needs guidance and support so he won't return to his criminal ways, Duncan and Tessa hire him to work in their shop and he joins them on several adventures. For a time, they temporarily move to Paris together. While in Paris, MacLeod's friends are hunted by a group of people called Hunters, mortals who believe immortals are abominations who must be eliminated. MacLeod learns the Hunters are a rogue sub-group of a larger organization called the Watchers, mortals who have studied and recorded the lives of immortals for thousands of years. Returning to Seacouver, Richie and Duncan befriend Joe Dawson, a benevolent Watcher assigned to observe the Highlander.

A group of Hunters later kidnap Tessa. MacLeod frees her and sends her home with Richie while he remains to look over their files. Outside, Richie and Tessa are both robbed and shot down by a mugger. Tessa dies as Richie awakes, fully healed, realizing what MacLeod knew the night they first met: he is also immortal. Following Tessa's death, Richie becomes more cynical about life. MacLeod has Richie sell the antique shop while he purchases DeSalvo's Martial Arts, keeping former owner Charlie DeSalvo on as manager and trainer. Charlie becomes a friend to Richie and MacLeod. He helps train the young man in martial arts and sword fighting, although he is unaware of the existence of immortals.

While saving the life of an ambassador, Richie inadvertently causes the death of a terrorist who is the friend of an Irish immortal named Annie Devlin. Devlin demands to duel Richie and Duncan is not allowed to interfere due to the rules of the Game. Duncan argues with both that they don't need to kill each other, but both refuse to listen. Richie then disarms Devlin in battle but cannot bring himself to kill. She gives up her quest for vengeance and leaves, while MacLeod then presents Richie with his own sword, a Spanish Rapier.

Later on, Richie ends up in conflict with the immortal Mako, a bounty hunter and old acquaintance of MacLeod's. Richie is determined to protect a woman he believes Mako is persecuting unfairly, but she later dies when she runs into the path of his truck. Mako claims this was an accident and that he only sought to bring the woman to the authorities and Duncan pleads for Richie to listen to reason. But the young man is enraged and beheads Mako. Duncan, believing Richie keeps acting rashly and letting anger guide him, tells the young man he must follow his own path now. The two men part ways with Duncan declining to shake Ryan's hand. Months later, the two reunite in France when Richie is wrongly blamed for a murder committed by another immortal. Following this, they renew their friendship, though Richie still leads his own life now as a professional motorcycle racer.

When an old girlfriend appears with a son she claims is Richie's, the young man decides this is an opportunity for a family at last. But after accepting that immortals cannot biologically have children and believing his immortal life is too dangerous to involve others, he turns the two away. Later, Richie encounters Mikey Bellows, a mentally challenged immortal with the mind of a child. Richie wishes to provide Mikey with a home and family, but multiple incidents prove this is too dangerous. Mikey, not understanding his abilities, causes the death of a police officer. To protect others, Richie reluctantly takes Mikey away to behead him. Realizing the situation, Mikey frees Richie from having to do so by laying his head on train tracks. Richie moves to a safe position as Mikey is killed by a train, forced to absorb the man's Quickening energy because of their proximity.

Soon after this, Richie chances on a young man named Roscza, the same mugger who shot him and Tessa. Roscza does not recall this, having done so when he was in the throes of addiction. Originally intending to kill the man in revenge, Richie decides to be satisfied that the former criminal and recovering addict now at least knows he took Tessa's life.

Richie's career is cut short when he is seen seemingly dying, forcing him to leave behind that life and operate clandestinely for a while with Duncan's help. Eventually, Richie meets the immortal James Coltec who has regularly used his unique abilities to take the "darkness" out of others. Absorbing the energy of yet another evil immortal causes Coltec to suffer a Dark Quickening, a rare phenomenon where an immortal's personality is corrupted and overwhelmed by the evil of the person whose Quickening they just absorbed. Forced to fight his old friend, MacLeod kills Coltec but is then himself corrupted by the Dark Quickening, attacking Richie afterward as a result. Saved by Joe Dawson, Richie is told to leave town. Though MacLeod later recovers his true personality, Richie is traumatized by their encounter and concludes that friendships between immortals are meaningless since in the end there can be only one. Determined to protect himself by increasing his power, Richie spends months challenging other immortals and taking their heads, using the skills Duncan and Charlie taught him.

After Richie kills the 900-year-old Carter Wellan, the man's immortal mentor Haresh Clay swears revenge. Richie breaks his sword during his first battle with Clay. Duncan later brings him a new sword, a rapier belonging to Graham Ashe, an old teacher of the Highlander's (and of Juan Sánchez-Villalobos Ramírez) who died at Clay's hands centuries before. Duncan defeats Clay and begins rebuilding a friendship with Richie. Soon afterward, Richie and Duncan meet Jennifer Hill, a woman seeking to avenge her husband Alec Hill. Richie later realizes he himself killed Alec Hill when he and the man had angrily challenged each other months before, he simply never knew the man's name. Jennifer approaches Richie romantically and he spends the night with her, later confused why he would do so and believing part of Alec's Quickening drove him. He then confesses to both her and Duncan. Jennifer attempts to kill Richie but then the young man briefly assumes Alec's voice and persona, pleading for mercy. Jennifer leaves, letting Richie live.

Feeling guilt over his months of challenging and killing, Richie follows an immortal who preaches peace. When an immortal kills his new teacher, Richie renounces his new pacifist lifestyle and takes the killer's head in revenge. Richie leaves Seacouver and returns to Europe under the name Richard Redstone. After being kidnapped by a woman named Marina LeMartin, the two begin a romantic relationship. Soon afterward, Duncan is tormented by visions he believes are caused by a legendary demonic being called Ahriman. Later, Ahriman casts illusions that lead Richie to an abandoned building. Duncan goes after his former student but is assaulted by new visions that convince him he is being attacked. Fighting to defend himself, Duncan unknowingly beheads Richie, who doesn't react in time to the attack from his friend. As Duncan sees flashes of Richie's memories and realizes he is absorbing the young man's Quickening, the illusion ends and he is horrified to see what he's done.

Joe Dawson sees to Richie's burial, the epitaph simply reading "A friend." A year later, the truth about Ahriman is confirmed and Duncan defeats the demon. Though his friends understand that the Highlander was influenced by another and could not distinguish illusion from reality, Duncan never fully recovers from the death of Richie and continues to blame himself for the young man's death.

== Character development ==
Richie Ryan was initially meant to provide comic relief in keeping with the show's adventure atmosphere and to provide exposition for the audience. Since he was new to the world of immortals and to Duncan, he could ask questions regarding the plot and characters that Tessa would already understand. He was also meant to be a young sidekick to whom the older Highlander could impart wisdom.

Regarding the original interpretation of the character, actor Stan Kirsch said, "Richie is a streetwise, street smart, seventeen/eighteen-year-old guy, who's had kind of a rough time growing up." Actor Adrian Paul, who played Duncan, added, "I think Duncan finds him very much as a young Duncan. He's brash... he's very quick, quick-talking, has a sense of humor, and Duncan finds that very beguiling, I think."

Regarding the relationship between Richie and Duncan MacLeod, Associate Creative Consultant Gillian Horvath said, "Here is this new kid on the block, just learning the ropes and having the best mentor in the world. This person who you feel can make anything right, and you're proud to be their sidekick." Tessa (meant to be in her mid 30s) and Richie likewise quickly develop an older sister/younger brother dynamic. On set, Vandernoot was actually only three years older than Kirsch but jokingly treated him as a loved younger brother due to his youthful appearance.

Richie's status as a pre-immortal was not completely decided during season 1. According to Executive Producer William Panzer, "When we cast Stan, we were just looking for a good actor and we found one, likable, charming, and building a very nice fanbase. We had not anticipated, when we cast him, that the option might exist for him to become an immortal. But we laid at that into the very first episode, 'The Gathering.'" Panzer was referring to MacLeod sensing an immortal in the first episode and concluding it is Richie before the villain Quince then arrives. In every other instance when the show featured an immortal sensing another, they were able to zero in on exactly who it was they sensed and not mistakenly target another person standing nearby. Along with this, Connor MacLeod shows an interest in Richie at the end of the episode, telling Duncan the young man will need someone to look after him. These two moments could be later be seen clues of Richie's immortality or could be dismissed as Duncan's senses being out of practice due to having spent years away from the Game and Connor wanting Duncan to make sure the young man simply did not tell others about the immortals he had witnessed. Another instance is in the season 1 finale "The Hunters," when Richie arrives on the barge and the immortal Hugh Fitzcairn sees him then looks questioningly at Duncan. While this could have been Hugh wondering if this new arrival was someone who already knew about immortals and could be trusted to join their discussion freely, it could also be that Hugh sensed Richie as a "pre-immortal" and was curious if Duncan had told the boy what he was or not.

The producers of Highlander: The Series remarked that the show became darker and more cynical following the death of character Tessa and that Richie was a major example of this, grieving for his friend while also discovering his immortality. Associate Creative Consultant Gillian Horvath recalled "it changed the tone of the show. It made Highlander the show where you couldn't be positive that the characters were safe because they were in the credits." Reviewer Rob Lineberger said, "Richie and Duncan relate to each other differently from now on, and Duncan is bereft of much of his joy [and] moodier as well. Tessa is no longer around to lighten him."

Creative Consultant and Executive Producer David Abramovitz said, "You can't keep a character a street punk for years. The character has to grow and grow on his own. This show is not called The Highlander and Richie. For Richie's growth, he really could no longer be the spear-carrier. The show was not inherently about him. And this is not because of the actor." Executive Script Consultant David Tynan added, "Once he had become immortal, he had to change and become more serious. For the character, he was going through a learning process and an evolution in terms of his spirit, his soul, and his relationship with MacLeod. He became in many ways less fun to write, I think, because he simply wasn't the smart-ass, wisecracking young street kid. He couldn't be, and that's the direction the character had to go in. There was really no other option."

Executive Producer William Panzer considered the episode "Under Color of Authority" as Ryan's coming of age story, when he killed another immortal in a rage and took his first Quickening. Panzer said, "This is the time for Richie to leave and kind of find himself, sort of see what it's like, surviving on the outside... And it is also a hard time for MacLeod. Is he crying? Is he sad to see him go? Is he a little afraid for him? You know, it's like any time you turn a youngster loose in the world, even today's world. It's a pretty scary moment for the parent."

Regarding Richie's shift from series regular to a recurring character, Gillian Horvath said, "Richie was never the hero of his own show, but he was the support of the hero. The first season Richie was the same guy for twenty-two weeks. And then certain landmarks start defining your characters and start creating arcs. Richie's going in and out in the second season, I think, helped define his character. I know it was frustrating for Stan - he liked being in every show - but I think it helped define the character because it meant you kept seeing landmark events in his life that kept changing him... If he had been around every week, he would have just had the 'What's up, Mac?' scene. The fact that he's in fewer episodes means that when he is in an episode, he has something to do."

Regarding Richie's death, Kirsch said, "I could have said no, I could have not done the episode. At the time, I was not contractually obligated to do the show. But I elected to do it, knowing Richie was going to get killed. I wasn't out to keep Richie alive. I'm an actor and that's what I do. I will go whenever and wherever to act and to play interesting stories." Following his departure from the show, Kirsch remarked, "You hear nightmare stories about other shows, but we really got along. I am going to miss those people and I certainly hope my friendships with them will remain strong."
