= James Horton (Highlander) =

- Highlander character
- First appearance: "The Hunters"
- Portrayed by: Peter Hudson

In-universe information
- Gender: male
- Born: 1945
- Death: 1994 (aged 48–49)

James Horton is a fictional character from Highlander: The Series, portrayed by actor Peter Hudson. A mortal Watcher, he is protagonist Duncan MacLeod's archenemy and fellow Watcher Joe Dawson's brother-in-law.

== Appearances ==
James Horton is first introduced in the first season finale episode, "The Hunters" (1993), as the leader of the men who enter Darius's (Werner Stocker) chapel and behead him. Those men, called the Hunters, then kidnap MacLeod's friend, fellow Immortal Hugh Fitzcairn (Roger Daltrey). Horton later sets up a plan to meet MacLeod's lover Tessa Noël (Alexandra Vandernoot) and check a wound she has on her hand to see if she is immortal. Tessa is frightened and bewildered by this encounter. In the meanwhile, Fitzcairn has been brought to the Hunters' headquarters. The script says that Horton and his accomplices "study Fitzcairn as one would a large, interesting insect," then shoot him with a crossbow to see if he will revive, proving that he is an Immortal. When Fitzcairn awakes, Horton tells him, "I've often wondered how much pain an Immortal could bear before he went mad." MacLeod searches for the Hunters' hiding while Horton is addressing his men: "We have won a great victory. We have destroyed a malignant evil that has walked this earth in the form of a man for the last two thousand years. People do not cheer us, people don't even know we exist, but we know the battle we fight. We know the evil we must destroy. I would like to send you back to your homes... to your lives... but our work here is not finished." Horton tells Fitzcairn, "You are an abomination before nature and in the eyes of man. There is no glory but ours. No destiny that is not of our making." Horton is about to guillotine Fitzcairn when MacLeod enters. In the ensuing fight, Horton tells MacLeod, "When you kill me, others will come. To continue what we have begun. (...) We've always understood. We will never be dominated. (...) We know about the Gathering. (...) It's about power. There is nothing greater that the power of man. Nothing. (...) You must die. All of you."

In "The Watchers" (1993), after MacLeod meets his Watcher, Joe Dawson (Jim Byrnes), Horton remarks to Dawson, "You spoke with one of them. That's never happened before." When Robert (Cameron Bancroft), one of his men who is also the fiancé of his daughter, Lynn (Kehli O'Byrne), expresses doubts about the Hunters, Horton answers, "It doesn't matter if they're good or evil, Robert. They're here to dominate us. They fight for their right to rule us. And one day, that is what they will do." When Robert expresses the wish to leave the Hunters because MacLeod spared his life, Horton kills him, but is able to comfort Lynn afterwards when she learns of her fiancé's death. Horton then mounts a trap to behead MacLeod, but Dawson confronts him, saying, "What you are doing is totally wrong. It betrays everything we stand for. (...) They aren't all evil." Horton answers, "I felt like a doctor watching a cancer grow." MacLeod enters and Horton admits to having killed Robert, saying, "Sometimes in war innocents get harmed. I believe that the generals call it collateral damage." MacLeod is about to kill Horton but renounces because Lynn begs him not to. Horton is infuriated and shoots MacLeod in the back. MacLeod is able to stab him with his sword before collapsing dead. When he revives, the others have disappeared.

In "Unholy Alliance" (1994), Horton concludes an agreement with Immortal Xavier St. Cloud (Roland Gift), in which Horton provides mercenaries that shoot Immortals dead so that Xavier can safely behead them. Horton also uses Xavier's Watcher, Barton, to manipulate Dawson so that Dawson tells MacLeod where Xavier is, and Xavier is waiting for him with his mercenaries. MacLeod comes as planned, but his friend Charlie DeSalvo (Philip Akin) has followed him and witnesses the fight between MacLeod and Xavier, then MacLeod being mortally shot by Horton, before being shot himself by Horton. MacLeod revives and breaks open Horton's grave in the Dawson family crypt. But it is empty, and MacLeod finds Horton alive and standing in front of him. MacLeod moves to attack him, but Horton warns him, "Holy Ground, MacLeod! Shame on you... You're forgetting the rules. I tried to get Xavier to come but even he wouldn't kill here." When MacLeod asks if Horton does this to feel powerful, Horton replies, "This is not about me, MacLeod. This is about you, you and your kind. You're an abomination." Then Horton boasts, "I'm the man you can't kill. Frustrated? I know I would be in your position. How would you like to kill me? ...with your sword? No, I think you'd prefer to do it with your bare hands, feel the life drain away from me." Eventually Horton hints that Dawson knows everything and escapes. Later, MacLeod watches Dawson join Horton on their boat, and corners Dawson to hear the truth from him. Dawson explains, "After you fought with Horton, I had to take him to the hospital. He was dying. (...) I made sure he was through with the Watchers, MacLeod. No one was to contact him, and not even his own people. He was an outcast. (...) I've known the man for twenty-five years, he's my sister's husband. I couldn't just let him die. He said he just wanted to leave the country, live quiet." Dawson says he did not tell this to MacLeod "because I knew you'd kill him." MacLeod is hurt that Dawson has lied to him and turns his back on him.

In "Unholy Alliance Part Two" (1994), Horton and Xavier are still plotting MacLeod's death together. During their conversation Xavier puts a friendly hand on Horton's shoulder and Horton shows disgust at this physical contact with an Immortal. He remarks, "It would give you great pleasure to kill Duncan MacLeod, would it not ?" When MacLeod enters, Horton gets a helicopter to allow Xavier to flee the ensuing fight. Later in Paris, when MacLeod finds their hiding, Horton tries to flee again on a boat, but Dawson stops him. Despite Horton's claim that "we're family," Dawson shoots him and Horton falls in the river. Horton is next seen in the episode tag, watching MacLeod from a distance and apparently unharmed.

In "Counterfeit" (1994), Horton sets up an elaborated trap to kill MacLeod. He uses Pete Wilder (Martin Cummins) to befriend Richie and make MacLeod suspicious, which spreads discord between the two. At the same time, he has murderer Lisa Halle (Meilani Paul) kidnapped and her appearance altered by plastic surgery so that she looks like MacLeod's deceased lover Tessa. While she recovers from the operation, he muses, "Do you know what true greatness is, Lisa ? Someone who is truly great celebrates in silence. He doesn't hold up his trophy to the world. (...) True greatness is completing a task that others have found impossible. (...) I am going to do something that many have tried and that none have ever achieved and that only a handful have lived to know about. I'm going to destroy Duncan MacLeod. And, every day, to the rest of my life, I'm going to remember and relish it. (...) In a way, it's sad, because whatever else I do, I shall never equal this."

In "Counterfeit Part Two" (1994), Dawson mentions that he and Horton designed the Watcher's computer security system together "to be bullet-proof" and that it uses thumb print to get in. MacLeod rationalizes that Horton might have survived Dawson's shot by wearing a ballistic vest. Horton tries to kill Dawson but Richie takes the bullet instead. Horton waits for Lisa to kill MacLeod on Tessa's grave. Horton enters after hearing a gunshot, tries to behead MacLeod but MacLeod stops him. Horton kills Lisa and runs for his life, but MacLeod catches up with him and kills him.

== Characteristics ==
Horton's character was subject to a number of changes. Hudson commented, "I suddenly found out that he had a daughter and was established in the States and so on. (...) Horton did change, even though it was sometimes more of a brutal change than a revolution." Hudson thought that Horton "had a genuine hatred for the Immortals [and] was an intelligent man. [Hudson] always tried to play him as someone who had definitely had military training. And [Horton] felt that he had a mission, which was to remove the Immortals." Hudson thought that Horton "used Joe whenever it suited him, and there was never any sign of his having any real affection for Joe at all, not any more that he had any real affection for his own daughter." Hudson commented that Horton "got good dialogue."

Executive Script Consultant David Tynan thinks, "Other characters we've killed off, but they weren't dead. Horton would not die. Of course, his brother-in-law, Joe Dawson, was the shakiest gun in the West. He seemed to not be able to hit the guy in any part of the body that would actually kill him. Horton kept surviving." Kirsch believed that Hudson "saw [Horton] as being somebody who was very hostile to what was going on around them. [Horton] doesn't think he's a bad guy." Paonessa agreed that Horton was "on a mission. (...) He cannot stand about this evilness that surrounds him."

== Concept and development ==
The script of "The Hunters" describes Horton as "an imposing man, muscular and intelligent in appearance". Horton was initially supposed to be the villain in only "The Hunters" and "The Watchers". Hudson believed that because those episodes went well, "they wrote me back in a couple more episodes" and that "when they got short of ideas they thought of me again, over the years." Hudson believed that "partly, it was geography because I spend a lot of time in France, anyway," so he was available for filming when production moved to Paris. Paul thought that Hudson "has an amazing stillness about him which has an evil quality to it." Kirsch thought Hudson "was so simple, (...) he would listen to everything and react to everything around him. He never had a preconception of how a scene should be (...) I think that he never liked to play [Horton] because [Hudson] didn't get over it, of being the bad guy, he was just very available." Paonessa thought Hudson "makes it look effortless."

During the shooting of "Counterfeit Part Two", Hudson was injured while filming the scene in the graveyard. He "tripped over a tombstone, fell on the corner of [a] marble tomb, and [he] had the beginning of a collapsed lung." However he did not stop shooting immediately, resulting in a few days' hospital. He had to be replaced by a body double in the scene where MacLeod chases him in the fields. Hudson commented that "You think you're a hero when you're playing somebody like Horton; you forget that you're not really invincible." While Hudson was at the hospital, Adrian Paul took his place off-camera for the scenes Vandernoot had to play with Hudson.

Lettow remembered that there was "not a dry eye in the room" when the producers watched the dailies of the "Armageddon" scene in which Ahriman-Horton offers Dawson his legs back. For the scene in which Horton's head turns into a skull, the only available elements were the images of Horton and of the skull. Paonessa had the idea of adding a series of segments from previous episodes to the transition and Editor Stein Myhrstad spend two hours doing it.

== Reception ==
Reviewer Kathie Huddleston of SciFi.com wrote that "Horton's silly plots to get Duncan, first joining with St. Cloud and later using plastic surgery to turn a criminal into a Tessa look-alike, make little sense, but they're fun to watch. He's kidnapping people and using elaborate plans when a sniper, a pretty girl with a gun or one of St. Cloud's gas bombs could do the trick to immobilize Mac long enough for Horton to take a sword to him." Reviewer Abbie Bernstein of Audio Video Revolution thought that "Avatar" "makes excellent use of guest actor Peter Hudson as Ahriman, who’s impersonating MacLeod’s dead foe, the fanatically anti-Immortal Horton." Reviewer Rick Sanchez of IGN wrote that "Horton, one of the Watchers, decides to go rogue and eliminate the immortals so they can't rule over the more fragile folks like you and me. Since this is a television series after all, it turns out that Duncan is the only one who can stop Horton's mad plans and Highlander gets an ongoing villain."
