= Hugh Fitzcairn =

- Highlander character
- First appearance: "The Hunters"
- Portrayed by: Roger Daltrey

In-universe information
- Gender: male
- Born: c. 1190, Sussex, England
- Immortality: 1224
- Death: 1995 (aged 804-805)
- Teacher: Henry Fitzmartin

Hugh Fitzcairn is a fictional character from Highlander: The Series, portrayed by actor and musician Roger Daltrey. An Immortal, he is a friend of protagonist Duncan MacLeod.

== Appearances ==
Fitzcairn is introduced in the season one finale episode "The Hunters" (1993) as a ladies' man and bon vivant; he is first seen entering MacLeod's barge while MacLeod and his girlfriend Tessa Noël are sleeping together, and tells Tessa, "Forgive me, my Lady... (...) Hugh Fitzcairn... I was so taken with your loveliness." Fitzcairn is actually worried about fellow Immortals disappearing unexpectedly. Darius is the next one, found beheaded in his chapel by MacLeod and Fitzcairn. While investigating, Fitzcairn is abducted by Darius' killers, the Hunters, led by James Horton, who tells him, "you are an abomination before nature and in the eyes of man." Even prisoner, Fitzcairn retorts, "You know, you really should do something about that temper of yours. One of these days it's going to get you in terrible trouble." Fitzcairn is fastened to a guillotine but MacLeod saves him at the last minute and Fitzcairn tells him, "The women of the world thank you, my friend." This episode also reveals that while Fitzcairn and MacLeod were in service to Duke diMilano in Italy in 1639, they first noticed the Watcher symbol that a Watcher disguised as a beggar wore on a pendant.

== History ==
Born in 1190 in Sussex, England, as a latent Immortal, Hugh Fitzcairn's first death in 1224 summed up his habit of getting himself into sticky situations over women: he was skewered by a jealous husband. He was first taught in the ways of the Immortal by Henry Fitzmartin. Fitzmartin either shared Hugh's exuberant ladies' man nature or spent his time exasperated by the young man. Fitz was a carefree well endowed man. Well loved by his friends, among them Duncan MacLeod, he was the life of every party and could charm any lady in the room.

Fitz was also a friend of Connor MacLeod and Darius. He flirted with a Montague woman named Selene, who was involved with Connor at the time, and called Connor a "renegade who would break her heart". Connor was so angry at Fitz, he refused to attend Robert and Gina DeValicourt's wedding, a decade later. Centuries later, he helped Duncan with Connor's recovery from a Dark Quickening, in early 1987. Fitz spoke fondly of "Brother Darius", and remarked to Duncan, that he had been one of the best Immortals.

In 1720 Fitz tried to copy the Gunpowder Plot of 1605 by assassinating King George I whom he regarded as a usurper. He was loyal to the House of Stuart at the time and remained a Roman Catholic in resistance to the Protestant Reformation. Duncan MacLeod inadvertently foiled the assassination attempt as he was trying to steal the Stone of Scone at the same time. ("Stone of Scone").

He was killed in 1995 by Antonius Kalas, who was on personal vendetta against MacLeod, whose objectives were to kill MacLeod's friends and later MacLeod himself. "Fitz" would be avenged by MacLeod when he killed Kalas. He will always be remembered for his carefree, romantic style. Mostly Duncan, with whom he shared innumerous adventures, going from a golf bet with MacLeod where he was found to be cheating and profusely denied it, to the theft of the Stone of Scone, the stone on which Scottish monarchs were traditionally crowned.

== Characterization ==
Fitzcairn thinks of himself as "kind and brave". The script of "The Hunters" says he is "no slouch" at sword fight. He appreciates mead, "the honeyed nectar of the gods." The Watcher Chronicles say of him, "Athos, Porthos and Aramis all rolled into one. (...) Although occasionally his loyalty to the women in his life lasted only until the next light of his pipe, he was tenaciously loyal to his friends. (...) Fitzcairn believed there was no greater goal in life than love, and it was the only thing worth dying for." The Chronicle article about his sword states, "Fitzcairn was a man of impeccable taste with an exaggerated sense of style, who adopted the most fashionable sword of any period. (...) The cup-hilt rapier seemed to suit his swashbuckling personality and flair for the dramatic."

== Concept and development ==
The script of "The Hunters" describes Fitzcairn as appearing "to be in his early forties, square set, ruddy complexion, a thick thatch of straw colored hair, wearing a white Irish weave fisherman's sweater. He smokes a pipe." Executive Producer Bill Panzer recalls that during the production of "The Hunters", actor Werner Stocker was unable to work and explains, "the part of Hugh Fitzcairn, played by another of the rock stars, Roger Daltrey, of The Who, became enlarged and (...) he was supposed to die at the end of the episode, and we decided to-- we liked him so much, we let him live."

Creative Consultant David Abramowitz says of both actors Roger Daltrey and Elizabeth Gracen, "They bring magic to the piece. Any time that they are in an episode I know that the episode is going to be fun and I know that it is going to be well acted. And I know that they are going to bring something beyond the page to the film. They have been wonderful." Executive Script Consultant David Tynan thinks, "Daltrey was fun in anything. The trouble was that we had killed off Fitzcairn. But on Highlander this is not the problem that it is with other shows, because one can always go into the past, when the person was alive."

Associate Creative Consultant Donna Lettow says about Fitzcairn's death, ""Star-Crossed" came about because [evil Immortal] Kalas needed to do something really despicable. I don't remember (...) whose idea it was, who said, 'And we should kill Fitz.' But it was brilliant. It is possible that if we had not brought back Fitz to kill him, we never would have brought him back at all, because at the time, we didn't know that Roger Daltrey liked the show. And when they were filming "Star-Crossed" the phone kept ringing; 'Does Fitz really have to die?' And at that time, David [Abramowitz] said, 'Well, yes, for the purposes of the arc, Fitz really has to die, but we could bring him back.'"

Tynan tells about the series finale: "The show was not intended to be completely dark; I tried to inject some humorous moments. Having Fitzcairn was inspired. I was surprised that we could get him. But when his name popped up, it was, 'Good God, of course, that's the obvious choice; Fitz!' Fitz is an angel in "To Be" and "Not To Be". And Roger Daltrey, the lead singer of The Who, as this impish character that he's become on Highlander, is a lot of fun." Associate Creative Consultant Gillian Horvath says, "It was great to have everyone in the finale who was important to Highlander over the years. And having Fitz, and Roger Daltrey, being part of that... you look at the episode and say, this is the payoff of a whole lot of setup."
