= Stan Kirsch =

American actor (1968–2020)

- Kirsch guest starring on Friends (1995)
- Born: Stanley Benjamin Kirsch Jr. July 15, 1968; New York City, New York, U.S.
- Died: January 11, 2020 (aged 51); Los Angeles, California, U.S.
- Occupations: Actor; screenwriter; director; acting coach
- Spouse: Kristyn Green (m. 2009)

Stanley Benjamin Kirsch Jr. (July 15, 1968 – January 11, 2020) was an American actor, screenwriter, director, and acting coach.

== Biography ==
Stanley Benjamin Kirsch Jr. was born in New York City, New York on July 15, 1968. He began acting as a young child. His first acting job was at the age of 4 when he appeared in some Campbell's Soup television commercials. Kirsch appeared in the short-lived Saturday morning TV series Riders in the Sky and on the soap opera General Hospital in 1992. He made guest appearances in some TV shows including JAG, Family Law, and Friends.

His most notable role began in 1992 on Highlander: The Series as Richie Ryan. He left the show as a regular cast member in the fifth-season finale in 1997, but he made one last guest appearance in the series finale episode, "Not To Be" which aired May 17, 1998.

Kirsch made his debut as director and producer with the film Straight Eye: The Movie in 2004. In 2008, he founded his own acting studio called Stan Kirsch Studios.

On January 11, 2020, 51-year-old Kirsch was found dead in his Los Angeles home. The LA Coroner ruled Kirsch's death a suicide by hanging.

== Selected filmography ==
=== Film ===
- 1998: Reason Thirteen (Short) as Michael
- 1999: Shark in a Bottle as Punk #1
- 2000: The Flunky as Sammy Bestone
- 2004: Shallow Ground as Stuart Dempsey
- 2004: Straight Eye: The Movie (Short, writer, director) as Sonny
- 2005: Deep Rescue as Kevin

=== Television ===
- 1991: Riders in the Sky as Axl (1991)
- 1992–1997: Highlander: The Series as Richie Ryan
- 1992: CBS Schoolbreak Special as Steve
- 1992: The Streets of Beverly Hills (TV movie) as Kenny Street
- 1995: Friends as young Ethan
- 1995: ABC Afterschool Special as Matt
- 1996–2001: JAG as Lieutenant Ferrari / Ensign Frank Cody
- 1996: Home Song (TV movie) as Kent Arens
- 1998: The Sky's On Fire (TV movie) as Chuck
- 1999: Love Boat: The Next Wave as Vince
- 1999: Beyond Belief, fact or fiction
- 2000: Family Law as Rick Quinn
- 2002: First Monday as David Dahl Washington Post Reporter
