= Joe Dawson (Highlander) =

- Highlander character
- Portrayed by: Jim Byrnes

In-universe information
- Gender: male
- Born: 1950

Joe Dawson is a fictional character in the Highlander franchise, created for the live-action TV show Highlander: The Series. A marine who leaves active service after losing his legs during the Vietnam War, he finds a new calling by joining the order of Watchers, people who record the lives and actions of immortals who secretly live on Earth. His main assignment during the course of the show is to chronicle the life of protagonist Duncan MacLeod, an immortal swordsman born in the Scottish Highlands. When the Highlander learns about the Watchers, he meets Joe and the two eventually become friends. Joe Dawson is portrayed by actor Jim Byrnes.

== Fictional biography ==
=== Series ===
Born in 1950, Joe Dawson later joins the United States Marine Corps and fights in the Vietnam War. His commanding officer is Andrew Cord, an immortal (though at the time, Dawson is unaware such people exist). In 1968, after seeing Cord shot, Dawson accidentally steps on a landmine that explodes. Cord, now healed from his injuries, carries Joe on his back for sixteen miles to the nearest field hospital. Joe tries to explain Cord saved him, but is told Cord is dead. Due to his injuries from the landmine, both of Joe's legs are amputated. He is sent home.

Unable to cope with the loss of his legs, Joe decides to commit suicide but is visited by a Watcher named Ian Bancroft, who tells him that some rare humans are born immortal due to an energy called the Quickening. These immortals can only die if beheaded and can take each other's energy and knowledge if one kills another. Because of this, several hunt each other in a secret Game of mortal combat, believing that the final survivor will win the Prize: the collected power and knowledge of all immortals who ever lived. "In the end, there can be only one." Bancroft is part of an organization called the Watchers who study and chronicle the lives of these immortals from afar and will one day reveal this secret history to the world once the Game has been won. Bancroft offers to recruit Dawson into the organization. Driven by a new purpose in life and realizing he owes his life to an immortal, Joe becomes a Watcher historian in 1968. Bancroft becomes Dawson's mentor and a close friend. Joe later becomes brother-in-law to James Horton, a high-ranking Watcher. Joe develops a close friendship with Horton and comes to love Horton's daughter Lynn.

Later becoming a field operative, Dawson watches over the immortal Roy Ferrer (1971–1974) and then Liza Grant (1975–1978). In 1979, he is assigned to watch Duncan MacLeod, an immortal Highlander born in 1592 and kin to the immortal warrior Connor MacLeod born decades earlier. When Duncan MacLeod makes his home in Seacouver, Washington with his lover Tessa Noël, James Horton buys a nearby bookshop Shakespeare & Co. and has Dawson manage it in order to provide him a cover. Dawson comes to admire and respect MacLeod, noting that the Highlander does not wish power, forges friendships with several immortals, and cares deeply for mortal humans and society, often helping friends and strangers whenever he thinks they are in trouble.

Unknown to Dawson, Horton comes to believe that immortals are abominations and none of them will be uncorrupted by power if they win the Prize, meaning humanity will suffer no matter who wins the Game. Determined that human society will not be ruled by any immortal, Horton leads a sub-group of likeminded Watchers who call themselves the Hunters. The group begins secretly hunting and executing immortals, eventually gaining the attention of Duncan MacLeod when they kill his friend, an immortal priest named Darius. Finding a recovered Watcher's journal among Darius' possession, Duncan learns of the organization and then meets Horton when the man attempts to kill another immortal friend, Hugh Fitzcairn.

Eventually, MacLeod comes across Joe Dawson. Secretive at first, Joe realizes MacLeod already knows about the Watchers and sees them as enemies. To prevent conflict, he admits his true identity and purpose to the Highlander. "I probably know more about you than you know about yourself… I could tell you the time and place you became immortal, the name of your first love. But that's not important. What is important is that you care about mortals and you don't kill for pleasure."

After Horton is exposed and expelled from the Watchers (though MacLeod initially believes he is dead), Dawson attempts to forge trust with the Highlander, openly informing him about his presence on various occasions. MacLeod is reluctant to trust at first, particularly after the recent death of his love Tessa, murdered by a mugger. As they slowly build a friendship, Dawson also befriends the Highlander's immortal apprentice Richie Ryan and his mortal friend and colleague Charlie DeSalvo, a martial artist who manages Duncan's gym and is unaware of the existence of immortals. At times, Dawson helps MacLeod by sharing Watcher information on other immortals, believing it serves the greater good if evil immortals are removed from the Game and secretly hoping the winner will be someone like the Highlander.

When Horton hunts immortals again, this time in allegiance with the evil immortal Xavier St. Cloud, MacLeod is furious that Joe lied about the man's death. Horton and his men then nearly kill Charlie DeSalvo while attempting to help St. Cloud kill MacLeod. Later, Horton attempts to flee again and Dawson shoots him. Horton falls into the water and Dawson tells Duncan, "We make mistakes... we clean them up." Horton later turns up alive and attempts to attack MacLeod psychologically through an agent masquerading as his dead love Tessa. Dawson prevents Horton from shooting MacLeod later and the Highlander finally kills the man. Dawson sees to the burial.

Dawson eventually opens a jazz club and bar called Joe's (later renaming it Le Blues Bar). Along with hiring bands, Joe himself performs and sings jazz music regularly. The bar also acts as a meeting place for other Watchers. The extent to which the staff of the bar knows about the Watchers, or if they are Watchers themselves similar to the book shop staff, is never disclosed. Dawson continues helping MacLeod and Richie. He and MacLeod later learn that his Watcher colleague Adam Pierson is in fact the legendary 5000-year-old immortal Methos. Joe keeps the secret that one of the Watchers is in fact the oldest living immortal, and the two forge their own friendship.

When Andrew Cord comes to Seacouver, Dawson learns he has become a remorseless killer and arms dealer and murdered Charlie DeSalvo's love Mara. Despite this, believing he owes his life to Cord, Dawson asks both MacLeod and Charlie to leave him alone and asks Cord to do the same. MacLeod allows Cord to go free, but Charlie confronts him and is killed. After finding his friend just before he dies, MacLeod avenges Charlie by beheading Cord.

After several Watchers are murdered by an immortal, the organization believes Joe is responsible by sharing the secrets of the organization with immortals such as Duncan MacLeod. He is put on trial and found guilty. Later, Duncan reveals the real killer, who learned about the Watchers from being hunted by Horton and not through Joe's actions. After unseating a high-ranking Watcher motivated by a vendetta who intended to start a war with the immortals, the Watcher organization reorganizes. Joe decides to leave rather than continue to be part of a group that has lost its way and because he does not believe he can keep Duncan's friendship if he stays. To his surprise, Duncan asks him to rejoin, hoping Dawson can ensure the organization returns to its principles and acts altruistically. Dawson accepts and once again becomes the head of Watcher activities in Seacouver and the surrounding area.

When the demonic entity Ahriman causes MacLeod to suffer visions that drive him to fear and violence, the Highlander unintentionally kills Richie Ryan. Dawson weeps over the loss of the young immortal and wonders if MacLeod has lost his sanity. Later, he encounters Ahriman, who offers him the return of his legs, fully functional, if he betrays Duncan. Though tempted, Joe declines the offer. When Ahriman kills Watchers, Joe decides the Watchers cannot intervene further but decides to continue helping the Highlander himself. When Ahriman is finally defeated, Joe considers Richie's death avenged.

=== Films ===
The 2007 made-for-TV movie Highlander: The Source follows the continuity of Highlander: The Series and takes place in a dark future where Earth society has fallen to chaos and violence. Dawson joins MacLeod and others as they investigate the legendary Source of immortality, an energy well located in Eastern Europe. The group is hunted and attacked by the Guardian, a magically empowered immortal. Joe attempts to protect the immortal Reggie Weller from the Guardian at one point, and the man fatally stabs the Watcher with the shattered blade of Duncan MacLeod's sword. MacLeod cradles Joe in his arms and they reaffirm how much they care for each other before the Watcher dies.

The 2008 short film Highlander: Reunion takes place a decade after the end of Highlander: The Series, written by series producer David Abramowitz and directed by Don Paonessa. The short film depicts Dawson (reprised by actor Jim Byrnes) alive and well in 2008 on a version of Earth that is not in danger of succumbing to chaos. He admits that he begrudgingly retired from active Watcher duty eight months before, just shy of 40 years of service. Dawson tells Methos that Duncan MacLeod is now observed by a newly recruited 28-year-old Watcher, a Princeton University graduate and member of Phi Beta Kappa. At the Highlander Worldwide Convention the next year, David Abramowitz and others from the TV series referred to Highlander: The Source as a "bad dream" Duncan had.

== Character development ==
=== Creation ===
The script of "The Watchers" originally called the character "Ian Dawson" and described him as a man between 40 and 60 years old from North America or England, adding, "There is a sense of power and mystery behind the man's scholarly appearance." According to Executive Producer William Panzer and Creative Consultant David Abramowitz, actors Michael York and David McCallum wanted to play the part. They were looked at because initially Joe was meant as a character "more studious, [with a] much tighter personality" than he eventually became. Abramovitz said, "In the beginning with Joe, the Dawson we wrote was a totally different character and it didn't work as well as it could." Byrnes was finally chosen because, according to Abramowitz, "Jim's soul plays through Joe Dawson." He added that Byrnes had "a certain quality that was just more real, more earthly than the other two… he had his own trials to live through his life, being handicapped, and he was a wonderful actor, but more than an actor he's got presence on a screen." William Panzer said, "he was a real mensch."

Actor Jim Byrnes recalled, "Immediately, I said, 'No, I'm not an Ian.' So we changed the name to Joe... Originally, I knew I was doing this one episode ["The Watchers"] where we were going to introduce the character and then we were going to take it from there. And they promised me X number more episodes just to kind of sweeten the pot to get me to do the show on short notice." Regarding the character's personality, Byrnes said, "Joe's been through the wringer… It would be hard for people to be around him too much, I think. He's kind of a loner, because at some point he's got to have some serious demons. These people have witnessed this crazy stuff; how do you deal with it? It's hard to be ordinary. Joe is extra ordinary, he's really ordinary. I mean that in a good way."

Dawson's function as a character was mostly one of exposition. Byrnes said, "So many times, it's the nature of the game, I end up saying, 'Well, you know, in 1865 they found this guy' and just do exposition. You got to tell the story some way. You're like the narrator because of the nature of the show; it's not about me." Dawson also had to face conflicts of his own. Abramowitz said, "Look at the stories that Joe opened up because of the character of Joe and the conflicts that Joe faces. And coming to terms with being somewhat of a hypocrite, which is, 'We observe; we don't act.' And then you see Joe act. Which happens because he is human and because it's a classic case of 'Do what I say, not what I do.' And that's the way life is and that's the way people are."

Regarding the episode "Turnabout," Executive Producer Bill Panzer said, "this episode was the beginning of the relationship, well the expansion of the relationship between Joe Dawson and Duncan MacLeod. For Joe to help MacLeod by getting him a file was for him a very big step in what became a major character arc as the two of them grew closer and closer." Regarding the episode "Unholy Alliance," Abramowitz said, "It created tension between Joe Dawson and Mac, which was a very good thing, so that Joe just wasn't a sidekick, wasn't a helper, that he had his own agenda, that he had his own view of the world, and it really solidified in some ways what the perspective of the Watchers were." Abramowitz further observed, "I think that Joe believes that there is something singular and special about Duncan MacLeod, that there may be a destiny MacLeod has to fulfill, which is even greater than the Watchers'... Because he has seen signs, [in the episodes] 'Avatar,' 'Armageddon,' 'Something Wicked,' 'Deliverance,' 'Prophecy,' that separate MacLeod from everyone else, that there is a prophecy that MacLeod is the anointed one. We hint at it, and obviously Joe feels this, plus he feels a tremendous admiration for MacLeod. He loves Duncan MacLeod. This is as deep as one man can feel for another. And I think it's returned."

Introduced as a book store owner, Joe Dawson later purchases a bar called Joe's where he plays music with a band (actor Byrnes was a professional singer musician himself). Abramowitz explained, "We came up with the idea of the blues bar, which was a perfect place for him and gave us opportunities to hear his music." Regarding the introduction of the blues bar, Byrnes said it happened after the production crew saw him perform. "Everybody came out to hear the band play and then thought, 'How can we incorporate this into the show?' And we found a way and it's been great. It really helps you as an actor because it broadens Joe's scope immediately. It gives him a wider palette... Music is Joe's form of meditation... it's Joe's martial art." Associate Creative Consultant Donna Lettow said, "... We had just built Joe's a couple of episodes before, and a memo had gone out, saying, 'Use Joe's; we love it, it's beautiful.' And we spent a lot of money on it."

Some of Byrnes's music compositions were used in the episodes "Archangel" and "Avatar." Another song by Byrnes, "Jack of Diamonds", was used in "Run For Your Life." Panzer recollected, "That song was so cool that we lengthened the scene fifty percent because we wanted to hear more of his music as the whole thing works so wonderfully together."

Of his work after the show was completed, Byrnes said, "I had a good rapport with the crew, with Adrian [Paul], with the writers, the producers, etcetera. Obviously, I didn't get in the way, and what I did didn't hurt anybody. And people seemed to enjoy the character, so it's continued."

=== Dawson's disability portrayal ===
Like Dawson, Jim Byrnes served in the Vietnam War. Afterward, in 1972, the actor was attempting to move a stalled truck when he was struck by a car, leading to his legs being amputated. These experiences informed episodes of Highlander: The Series that explored Joe Dawson's military service and the loss of his own legs. In the episode "Brother in Arms," a flashback reveals that Joe Dawson lost both his legs during the Vietnam War. Executive Script Consultant David Tynan said, "In the scene where Joe wakes up to find his legs gone, I had to ask Jim what it was like. Jim said, 'Well, the fact is you don't wake up and scream in terror, you wake up and go Whoa and fall back to sleep, because you're so shot up with morphine, you have no idea what they're telling you.' So we adjusted the script accordingly. And certainly we were very concerned how Jim would feel, as we would be concerned about how any actor would feel about something that approached his personal life in such a way. And Jim was okay with it. I think that's a tribute to him as an actor and as a person, that he's not afraid to explore those areas."

In the episode "Armageddon," Dawson is tempted with the possibility of having fully functional legs again. Abramowitz said, "I called him before and I said, 'Jim, how do you feel about this?' Because I would never do anything that would make him uncomfortable as a human being. But he was actually excited to do it. He was really into it, up for it, going for it. He's come to terms with his life and who he is." Associate Creative Consultant Gillian Horvath said, "It's big stuff for him. It's issues from his own life, but it's not about him; it's about Joe, but they obviously share some certain traits. That he's willing to bare his own life, his own feelings, in order to give Joe something that strong. That he cares enough about the character to say, 'Yeah, let's give him this big scene and in order to do it I will use myself, part of me will be offered up.'" Lettow recalls that when the producers viewed the dailies of Armageddon, there was "not a dry eye in the room. And we watched those over and over and just marveled at Jim Byrnes' ability. And sat here saying, 'Oh my God, what have we done to him?'"

=== Reception ===
The audience reaction was favorable. Abramowitz recalled, "he was one of the fans' favorites all over the years that we made the show." He also said, "It's hard to identify with someone who is immortal... but a Watcher's just a normal human being. And so the audience could find themselves thinking, 'I could be that guy.' And I think Joe became every man of the show. He became the audience in a big way."

Byrnes added, "I think [the Watchers are] part of the reason that the character caught on. We are all Watchers, everybody that's a fan of the show. We are all members of the same organization, so I think that puts me, an ordinary guy, in extraordinary circumstances, and that gives everybody something to hang on to. I think that's why the character has worked. We all get older and have our aches and pains and we look different every day, you know, a couple extra miles, so it gives that sense of continuity. I just put everybody, all the viewers, I think, a little bit closer to the picture. Because they see me, and some days I don't look so hot and some days I look all right. It's the human element. Joe's just an ordinary person witnessing extraordinary events."
