= Immortal (Highlander) =

Fictional characters in the Highlander franchise

In the Highlander franchise, human beings born with the power of "the Quickening" become immortal if they suffer a premature death by unnatural means (such as by violence). After this First Death, they are ageless and cannot definitively die unless their head is removed or destroyed. From the time they are born, immortals and "pre-immortals" cannot biologically have children. Immortals can sense each other's presence and may take the Quickening, the "essence" or power that makes them immortal, from another of their kind by beheading them. They duel each other across the centuries, a deadly "Game" with few rules. One day, the last few will fight during "the Gathering" and the survivor will win the Prize, the collected energy of all immortals who ever lived, enough power to conquer or destroy humanity. "In the end, there can be only one."

These immortals are first introduced in the 1986 film Highlander, featuring Connor MacLeod (Christopher Lambert), a Scottish Highlander born in the 16th century and trained to be a warrior by an Egyptian immortal calling himself Ramírez (Sean Connery). Their mythology and nature is expanded on mostly through the live-action television show Highlander: The Series, which follows Duncan MacLeod (Adrian Paul), another immortal who belongs to the Clan MacLeod. Other films and tie-in media add their own ideas. Highlander: The Series introduced the idea that the lives and actions of immortals are recorded by a secret order of mortal humans known as the Watchers.

== Origin ==
The 1986 Highlander film was written by Gregory Widen, who created its world of immortals and the ageless Scottish Highlander Connor MacLeod. Widen was studying film at University of California, Los Angeles and working on a class writing project. According to Widen, "The idea of the story was basically a combination of a riff on The Duelists – [a Ridley Scott film where] guy wants to finish a duel over years – and a visit I made both to Scotland and the Tower of London armour display, where I thought, 'What if you owned all this? What if you’d worn it all through history and were giving someone a tour of your life through it?' That scene is basically in the movie."

According to William Panzer, producer of Highlander: The Series, "And that's where everything fell into place — the idea that there are immortals and they were in conflict with each other, leading secret lives that the rest of us are unaware of." Widen's class instructor advised him to send in the class project script to an agent. It became the first draft of the screenplay for the 1986 film Highlander.

In the Highlander franchise, the in-universe origin of the immortals is unknown. They are people born at different times and in different places throughout history. They cannot have children, so it is not a gift that is hereditary. When an immortal is born with such a gift seems to be random. In Highlander: Endgame, Connor MacLeod says, "In the days before memory, there were the immortals. We were with you then, and we are with you now... We are the seeds of legend, but our true origins are unknown. We simply are."

Seemingly by coincidence, multiple immortals of Highlander: The Series are foundlings, orphans taken in by other families but whose true parents are never discovered. In the novel White Silence, Duncan MacLeod tells Danny O'Donal, "We're all foundlings." This seems to be a metaphor, as there are several immortals in the series raised by their natural parents and there is no indication in the movies that Connor MacLeod was adopted.

Highlander II: The Quickening (1991) attempted to give an origin to immortals by revealing that they were criminals from the distant planet Zeist who were exiled to Earth, becoming immortal in the process. How the journey to Earth or the environment of Earth granted immortality to people from Zeist was not explained. A later director's cut entitled Highlander II: The Renegade Version altered several scenes to remove the alien origin and cut out all verbal mention of Zeist, once again making the origin of immortality a mystery. The later films and TV series do not consider Highlander II to be canon.

Highlander: The Source (2007) was a made-for-TV movie that followed the TV series continuity and attempted to hint at another origin for immortals. Taking place in a future world where society across Earth has fallen to violence and chaos, Duncan MacLeod and others investigate the Source of immortality, an energy well hidden in Eastern Europe. The closer immortals are to the well, the more their healing abilities will fail. It is implied that direct access to the Source may grant unlimited power to an immortal and/or the capability of having children from then on. Plans to further expand on the nature of the Source in future films were abandoned in light of overall negative reception to the movie among fans. At the Highlander Worldwide Convention in 2009, David Abramowitz (who wrote the film) and others from the TV series referred to Highlander: The Source as a "bad dream" Duncan MacLeod had.

== Way of Life ==
Because they are born in different eras and cultures, there is no common culture or way of life shared by the immortals beyond the rules of their conflict with each other. In Highlander: The Series, Connor MacLeod considers a tribe of Native Americans and muses: "Do you think we ever lived like this, like a tribe? Together with a common language, a reason and a name for each living thing? Did we once belong somewhere - a time, a place - however briefly?"

Highlander: The Series producer William Panzer said, "for the most part, immortals are very much like ordinary people... Some make a lot of money. Some become terrorists... Some become policemen because they like to fight. Some become great lovers. Some like Duncan MacLeod become righters of wrongs." He added, "Most of the time, when we think about immortality, we think about the problems of immortality. The loneliness, the idea of losing loved ones over the centuries. The danger of being in conflict with other immortals... the solitude, the living a dark shadowy life... how a man can, in three lifetimes, go from being a slave to being someone with hopes and dreams of becoming a professional baseball player to finally someone who had hopes and dreams of actually changing the world."

The life of secrecy and violence, as well as numerous traumas and losses that an immortal can experience or witness over the centuries, can lead them to become apathetic. According to TV series Creative Consultant David Abramovitz, "It's very easy for an immortal to become cynical."

Pre-immortals, those who have the potential to become immortal but have yet to experience their First Death and discover their power, can be easy prey for evil immortals who want their Quickening energy. In the original film Highlander, the villain known as the Kurgan attempts to behead Connor MacLeod and take his Quickening before the young Scotsman can discover his immortality and become a trained warrior.

People who discover that they are immortal are either killed by corrupt immortals who want their power and see an easy target or are fortunate enough to find a mentor who will teach them how to fight, survive, and blend in, as well as the rules of the Game. The films and TV series often indicate a great bond existing between a mentor and their student. Sometimes a student or mentor turns on the other and takes their power. In the original Highlander film, Ramírez does not answer when his student Connor MacLeod asks "If it came down to just us two, would you take my head?" Later, Connor has a chance to kill Ramírez but instead offers his hand and calls him "brother."

Strong friendships between immortals are also seen beyond the bond of mentor and student. In the series, Duncan MacLeod and Amanda show several times that they would risk themselves for each other and show no signs of wishing to kill each other even if they were the last two left. In the original movie, old friends Kastagir and Connor know that they are two of the last three immortals left on Earth, the third being the evil and powerful Kurgan. Rather than kill each other so they can have extra power before battling the Kurgan and winning the Prize, the two gleefully hug and decide to socialize instead. Some immortals prefer not to make strong friendships with other immortals, believing the Game means that they will inevitably have to kill each other.

== The Quickening ==
In the original film Highlander, the word "Quickening" indicates the energy that makes a person immortal. When the immortal Ramírez is showing Connor MacLeod their abilities to survive deadly forces and to sense the emotions of living things around them, he refers to these powers collectively as "the Quickening." When immortals are beheaded by another immortal, the Quickening energy releases from the dead one and is absorbed into the surviving victor. This gives them stronger power and may increase their fighting ability and insight as well. In the original movie, Connor MacLeod (after being alive for over 400 years) shows keen insight into the feelings of people around him, and when entering the home of a person who doesn't trust him, he instantly knows where she would have hidden things in the room, such as a weapon. Because evil immortals covet more power, they hunt down other immortals in order to absorb their energy. They hope that if they do this long enough, they will eventually be the last one alive, earning the Prize, the total collective Quickening energy of every other immortal.

In the original film, there seems to mainly be a transfer of power. In Highlander III: The Sorcerer, it is indicated that some knowledge might also transfer from a dead immortal to their killer. This same film, and certain episodes of the TV series, indicate that rare immortals may also have other seemingly supernatural powers, such as sorcery or clairvoyance. It may be that these are connected to their unique Quickening energy or that they may be unrelated powers that the person was born with, since Duncan MacLeod also encounters a human with clairvoyance who is completely mortal. In the anime Highlander: The Search for Vengeance, immortals can use their Quickening energy to attain increased strength and speed.

In Highlander: The Series, the characters do not have the same connection to nature and living things that is seen in the films. Characters often use the term "Quickening" to refer to the actual process of an immortal's energy being released after losing their head. Series actor Adrian Paul explained, "The Quickening is the receiving of all the power and knowledge another immortal has obtained throughout his or her life."

In Highlander: The Series, it is said that the immortal who survives a duel with another will not only absorb power but also some physical skills and can temporarily experience personality traits and flashes of memory from the one beheaded. In rare cases, an immortal can be overwhelmed by the personality of the person whose Quickening that they just absorbed, leading to a shift in their own personality, such as in the season 4 episode "Something Wicked". In the same episode, Duncan MacLeod reveals that some immortals speak of this phenomenon as a "Dark Quickening", when the personality is overloaded and corrupted.

The films and series indicate that if an immortal is beheaded and there is not another immortal nearby to absorb their Quickening, there is no visible energy release at all. Producers of Highlander: The Series said that in such cases, the energy simply dissipates. It was also suggested that the energy may return to the energy well called the Source seen in the film Highlander: The Source, if it is indeed the true origin of immortality as some believed.

=== First Death ===
The TV production crew and promotional materials included with the DVDs of Highlander: The Series refer to people who have the potential to become immortal but have not experienced their First Death yet as "pre-immortals". According to William Panzer, pre-immortals "carry within them the seed of their immortality which is triggered by a non-natural death." The movie Endgame establishes that the process is trigged by the "shock of a violent death" and that without such a trigger the pre-immortal person will simply age and die as other humans. The First Death can happen many ways beyond intended violence, such as drowning, burning, a car crash, a fall from a great height, etc. It is generally believed by fans, but not confirmed, that death by disease is not enough to awaken immortality in a pre-immortal and will simply kill them. The related TV series Highlander: The Raven confirms that dying of fatal poison will not trigger a pre-immortal's power and that they will simply die permanently.

After the First Death triggers the immortality, the immortal now has full access to their healing abilities and will stop aging. In the original film, immortals are able to sense each other even before the First Death. In the live-action TV series, immortals have no access to their powers at all until after the First Death, including the Buzz which allows them to sense others of their kind. Other immortals can sense a pre-immortal. This makes them vulnerable to fully realized immortals who wish to steal their Quickening before they can realize their power and become trained fighters, just as the Kurgan tried to kill Connor MacLeod before the young Highlander knew his true nature.

A First Death happening too early in life can be a hindrance. At one point in the TV series, a boy named Kenny is revealed to be an immortal who died at the age of 12, arresting him in that age physically even though his mind is still able to mature.

=== Healing ===
In the first film, Connor and the Kurgan are invincible to all injuries and heal quickly, allowing them to shrug off fatal gunshots without much pause (though they do feel pain). In Highlander: The Series, immortals cannot die permanently unless beheaded but they can still enter a temporary death-like state if they suffer fatal actions such as drowning or loss of blood or hanging. They revive moments or minutes later. William Panzer said, "One of an Immortal's greatest fears is to be buried alive and probably unfound for thousands of years."

Non-lethal injuries heal very quickly and vanish without a trace, the one exception being injuries to the neck. Both the Kurgan and Kalas have their throats cut. Although the wounds heal, permanent scars remain and their voices are permanently altered. In the TV series, wounds sometimes heal with visible Quickening energy flashing across the wound. An Immortal cannot completely regenerate or replace a limb or major portion of the body that is destroyed or separated. If they lose a hand or an eye, that is permanent.

=== The Buzz ===
Immortals in the original movie Highlander can sense each other, with one of them describing it as feeling ill. In the live-action TV series, this ability to sense each other is expressed by a sound effect referred to in scripts and subtitles as "the Buzz". Producer William Panzer defined the Buzz as "the concept of immortals being able to sense each other's presence from a reasonable distance. We called it the Buzz. That word was never used, but that's how it was featured in the scripts."

Buzz sounds were produced at the Post Modern Sound in Vancouver, British Columbia. Sound Supervisor Tony Gronick explained the Buzz as "a metal grinder that's affected so it jumps from left to right and has reverb on it," and a whoosh-like sound created by former Sound Effects Editor Mike Thomas. Former Sound Supervisor Vince Renaud said, "The standard Buzz stays pretty much the same, then every once in a while they want something different for a Buzz." Sound effect variations on the Buzz included, according to Gronick, "Just getting a note of choir and then looping it, so it extends. Or we've taken the highs out of it and echoed it. Or one has an autopan on it, so we have it shifting from left to right."

=== The Gathering and the Prize ===
In the original film Highlander, the warrior Ramírez says that immortals will fight and kill each other and take each other's power until "the time of the Gathering." He then explains further, "When only a few of us are left, we will feel an irresistible pull towards a far away land, to fight for the Prize." The time of the Gathering is not consistent throughout the movies and series. In the film, the time of the Gathering is 1985 and the "far away land" is New York City. In Highlander: The Series, protagonist Duncan MacLeod believes during season 1 that the time of the Gathering is drawing near, as there are not many immortals left alive (relative to the number that used to exist). But it is never clarified how many are left alive nor does Duncan or any other character mention feeling an irresistible pull to a particular place. After season three, references to the Gathering are dropped and it is not certain when it may happen.

The films and TV series indicate that some immortals may not wish to live an eternity of violence where they kill other immortals, and may even find a way to live in isolation for a time, but the Gathering is inevitable. Evil immortals want the Prize and constantly hunt others in order to gain power, while some good immortals believe that it is their duty to ensure that no-one evil wins the Prize.

According to the original film, the Prize grants the victor the collective Quickening energy of every immortal who has ever lived. When the film showed Connor MacLeod winning the Prize in 1985, he became a mortal man, now able to age and father children, and his connection to nature increased to the point that he could now know the thoughts and dreams of any living person on Earth. MacLeod realizes that he is now "at one with all living things" and that ultimate knowledge means that he has "power beyond imagination." Earlier in the film, his mentor Ramírez warns that if an evil person were to gain the Prize, they would become powerful enough to enslave humanity to an "eternity of darkness" (Ramírez understood the power that the victor would gain but seemed unaware that they might become mortal in the process and die of old age if not sooner, so his belief that their rule over humanity would be eternal is understandable).

The TV series does not confirm if its version of the Prize also means that the victor will become a mortal man. In the very first episode of the series, Connor MacLeod says, "The last one will have the power of all the immortals who ever lived. Enough power to rule this planet forever. If someone like Slan Quince [an evil Immortal] is that last one, mankind will suffer an eternity of darkness, from which it will never recover." David Abramovitz, Creative Consultant on Highlander: The Series, said: "Because there can be only one... If that one is good, the world will see a golden age. If evil, the world will fall into anarchy."

=== Non-violent quickening release ===
In the alternate timeline of Highlander: The Animated Series (1994-1996), immortals find a way to transfer Quickening energy to each other without dying in the process. When two immortals grasp the same weapon and will it, Quickening energy transfers, increasing the power of one immortal while the other is now mortal shattering said weapon once the process is now completed. The former immortal is now able to age naturally and have children.

== Rules of the Game ==
Since immortals began battling each other for powers certain rules were created and agreed upon. In the original movie, it is said that the main rules of the game are "there can be only one" and that immortals must never fight on "holy ground." It is said that no immortal will violate this rule due to "tradition." In Highlander: The Series, more rules come into play:

- No fighting on a site considered to be "holy ground," regardless of what faith or whether the enemy is mortal or immortal.
- Immortal duels involve two opponents, one vs. one, with no help or interference from others.
- An opponent must be challenged directly to a duel. Attacking them when they are helpless (tied up, asleep, etc.) or disabling them so they cannot fight a duel (shooting them so they cannot recover before they are beheaded) is prohibited.
- Keep the existence of immortals secret from the world.
- In the end, there can be only one.

Creative Consultant David Abramowitz said, "When you do a show like this [Highlander: The Series], what you do is you make up a lot of it as you go along. The fans used to ask, 'Do you know all the rules from the beginning?' and it's just like in life: You don't know any of the rules. You make them up as you go along and you try your best to be consistent and so that no one turns around, and says, 'Wait a minute, you're cheating!' Because that's one thing we didn't want to do. We didn't want to ever cheat."

The rules are more of a code of ethics and conduct. In Highlander: Endgame, the immortal Jacob Kell ignores the rules by killing other immortals when they are helpless and shackled rather than challenging them to a duel. Likewise, he recruits others to help him overpower his targets by sheer force of numbers rather than fight one on one. In the series, the evil Xavier St. Cloud uses poison gas and hired gunmen to incapacitate his opponents before killing them.

Most Immortals can fight with several kinds of weapons (axe, sickle, machete, mace, etc.), but the most common is the sword. Immortals tend to keep their weapon of choice nearby, ready for a duel if necessary.

The rule against fighting on holy ground has occasionally been indicated to be more than a rule of conduct to ensure that there is an agreement of neutral territory and sanctuary. In the film Highlander III: The Sorcerer, two immortals are dueling near a Buddhist shrine when one of their swords explodes and as wind suddenly rises around them. Sensing the shrine's power, they stop their fight. In the TV series episode "Little Tin God", the character Joe Dawson describes a legend that says that the eruption of Mount Vesuvius was caused by "two Immortals going at it in a Temple of Apollo" in Pompeii, breaking the rule. However, he admits that this is only a rumor with no evidence to back it up.

== The Watchers ==
The Watchers are first introduced in the Highlander: The Series season 1 finale "The Hunters". They are a secret society founded centuries ago by some mortals who knew about Immortals and grew concerned about the winner of the Prize. Panzer says they have been "observing Immortals, recording their history but not interfering, for thousands of years." A group of Watchers later decides that immortals are "an abomination" and that to let one of them one day win the Prize and possibly rule humanity is unacceptable. This group, calling themselves the Hunters, begins hunting and killing many immortals. According to the Hunter leader, James Horton, "There is no glory but ours. No destiny that is not of our making... We will never be dominated."

In Highlander: Endgame, a sub-group of Watchers is likewise determined that the Prize is never won. Rather than hunt immortals, they created Sanctuary, a hidden location where immortals who wish to leave the Game are placed in a coma-like state and cared for. The Watchers of this sub-group protect these immortals, believe "there must always be two" or else humanity may one day be conquered. In the theatrical release of Highlander: Endgame, the Sanctuary was said to be hidden on holy ground, but the DVD release of the movie removed this reference.

== See also ==
- List of Highlander characters
