= Watcher (Highlander) =

Fictional order of humans in Highlander stories and movies

The Watchers are a fictional order of humans who record the lives and activities of immortals in Highlander: The Series and Highlander: The Raven, as well as related stories and movies.

In the Highlander franchise, Immortals are humans born with an energy called the Quickening that activates after a violent death. From then on, they are ageless and heal from all wounds, only dying if beheaded. Able to take each other's Quickening through killing, many immortals wage a secret war called the Game, believing that one day the last few will meet for the Gathering and a final battle will take place. The survivor will win the Prize, the collected power of all immortals who ever lived, enough power to enslave humanity or lead it into a golden age. The series follows Duncan MacLeod, an immortal born in the Scottish Highlands.

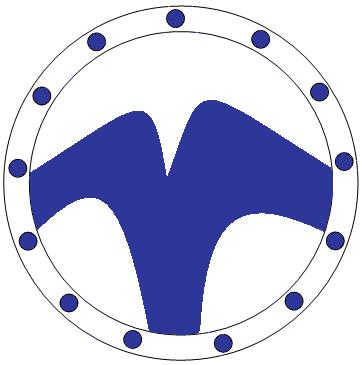
The Watcher Symbol

The secret organization of the Watchers was introduced in the season 1 finale of Highlander: The Series as a cliffhanger for the subsequent season. Since then, they became an integral part of the series and Duncan MacLeod's adventures, particularly the Watcher named Joe Dawson who became a series regular starting in season 2.

== Fictional biography ==
In the season 2 premiere episode of Highlander: The Series, "The Watchers", Joe Dawson explains the purpose of his organization: "For as long as your kind's been around, we've been watching... We observe, we record, but we never interfere... Too much of man's history has been lost. When you get through all of life's crap, the only thing that matters is the truth. We want the truth about immortals to survive, not a bunch of old wives' tales". It is said that once the last immortal has won the Prize, the Watchers will share their information with humanity and tell the world the truth about the immortal people who walked the Earth and helped shape history.

The organization was created by Ammaletu the Akkadian after he witnessed the warrior Gilgamesh coming back to life. Different cells of Watchers were created all over the world to watch immortals in their respective areas. To identify each other, Watchers wore medallion decorated by the symbol of their organization. In modern times, each Watcher has the symbol tattooed on the inner wrist, usually in blue ink.

Watchers are to observe and record the activities of immortals, not just their battles but their accomplishments and the lives they lead outside of the Game. The Watchers are meant to keep their existence secret so that the general public does not hunt immortals out of fear and ignorance. Secrecy also protects against corrupt immortals forcing Watchers to share sensitive information on other immortals. Such information could aid evil immortals in hunting others and could ultimately lead to an evil immortal winning the Prize. It is considered a serious crime among the Watchers to falsify or omit vital information in their official records or to aid an immortal with killing other immortals. Such a crime can lead to expulsion or even execution. Despite this, they have occasionally been discovered by other immortals. An immortal priest named Darius somehow came into possession of a Watcher's journal and kept it with him for years. Later in the 1990s, his friends Duncan MacLeod, Hugh Fitzcairn, and Richie Ryan learned of the Watchers and told certain trusted friends.

The Watchers seem to have vast resources and wealth, but several such as Joe Dawson run their own businesses to provide a cover identity as well as independent income. The Watchers have specific bases, libraries, and safe houses located in estates and buildings owned by the organization. Some Watchers work in the archives, cataloging and managing incoming information and recovered artifacts. Others work in the field, monitoring a specific immortal they've been assigned to watch until such time as it is decided the assignment will be done by another Watcher. Some are assigned to research areas of history and legends that require more factual evidence, such as the "Methos Project" where Watchers tried to uncover the truth behind the legendary figure said to be possibly the oldest living immortal. Unknown to the rest of the Watchers, the young operative Adam Pierson assigned to the Methos Project is actually Methos himself.

== The Hunters ==
In the late 20th century, a high-ranking Watcher named James Horton concluded that immortals were abominations and that humanity would suffer and be enslaved no matter who won the Prize, believing none of them could resist being corrupted by such power. He gathered together several other Watchers who felt similarly and they secretly became a sub-group known as the Hunters. Some hunted believing it was the best way to protect humanity. Some coveted the power of the immortals. Some enjoyed the killing due to their own prejudices.

The group spent months using their records to hunt down and behead immortals. This alerted certain immortals to the fact that someone was hunting them down. When they killed the immortal Darius, who had given up violence to become a priest, the group earned the attention of his friend Duncan MacLeod. MacLeod discovered the existence of the Watchers from the Watcher journal Darius had kept. After meeting Joe Dawson and learning more, Duncan discovered that Horton was the leader of the Hunters. This led to several confrontations before Horton's death.

== The Sanctuary ==
While the Watchers were mostly interested in keeping their existence secret from immortals, the 2000 movie Highlander: Endgame revealed that a breakaway sub-group made an exception for immortals who wanted to seek refuge from the Game and leave the world behind. To this end, these Watchers provided a secret place Sanctuary where they would place immortal volunteers into a coma-like state and care for them afterward. By providing this service, these Watchers meant to ensure that the Prize would never be won because there would always be at least some immortals still alive. There must always be two. It is unclear if the immortals who joined the Sanctuary knew they would be placed into a state where they would not be able to change their minds and ask for freedom unless awakened by someone else. It is also unclear if they knew that the Sanctuary was run by Watchers or believed it was an independent organization and didn't know about the larger Watcher order.

In Highlander: Endgame, an immortal villain named Jacob Kell invades the Sanctuary and kills the immortals who are there. Matthew Hale, the Watcher who supervises the facility, is desperate that the Prize must not be won and decides to kidnap new immortal "volunteers" to maintain the Sanctuary's purpose. Kidnapping Duncan MacLeod, he comes into conflict with Joe Dawson. Later on, Joe shoots down Hale when the man attempts to kidnap both MacLeod and Kell and force them both into the Sanctuary. It is not clear if Hale's death meant the end of the Sanctuary.

In the theatrical version of Highlander: Endgame, Methos refers to the Sanctuary as existing on holy ground. In the TV series and previous films, it was said immortals followed a traditional rule that fighting on holy ground was forbidden. The movie Highlander III indicated that fighting on holy ground would lead to unforeseen consequences but no other story indicated this and the movie also contradicted canon established in previous films. In the season 5 episode "Little Tin God", Joe told Duncan of a legend that two immortals killing on holy ground caused the destruction of Pompei, but admitted there was no evidence of this or anything similar happening throughout the history of immortals. Despite this, a number of fans criticized Highlander: Endgame for showing Jacob Kell killing other immortals on holy ground without any consequence and didn't care for the implication that it was simply a rule that others (including evil immortals) followed out of tradition, especially when the movie then showed Connor and Duncan being unwilling to kill Kell when he is on holy ground himself later. To simplify matters, the DVD and digital editions of Highlander: Endgame removed all reference to the Sanctuary being built on holy ground.
