= Highlander: The Series season 6 =

Highlander: The Series
- Season 6
- DVD box set
- No. of episodes: 13

Release
- Original network: Syndication
- Original release: October 5, 1997 – May 16, 1998

Season chronology
- ← Previous; Season 5

The sixth season of the French/Canadian drama/adventure television series Highlander began airing 5 October 1997 and finished on 16 May 1998. It was the final season of the program. The series follows the adventures of Duncan MacLeod, a 400-year-old Immortal who can only die if he is beheaded. The ongoing battle between Immortals is known as the Game.

== Production ==
Although season five was meant to be the final season of the show, the show was renewed for a sixth season. Production began in July and ended in December. When funding finally was announced, Adrian Paul was working on Highlander: Endgame and said he’d only be available for half the season or eleven episodes. Peter Wingfield, Jim Byrnes, and Elizabeth Gracen were contracted to fill out the season. However, Wingfield and Gracen had other commitments that prevented them from being available for filming until November 1997. The series began filming in Paris in the summer and the producers had been approached about doing a spin-off series, which would center on a female immortal (which later became Highlander: The Raven). A number of "spec" scripts for the new series were filmed as episodes to fill out the season, but funding was again cut and only thirteen episodes were filmed. Duncan does not appear in two episodes, "Two of Hearts" (which doesn't feature any of the main cast) and "Indiscretions", which was the last episode filmed for the series, but was shown before the finale two-parter, "To Be" and "Not To Be".

== Cast ==
=== Main cast ===
- Adrian Paul ... Duncan MacLeod
- Elizabeth Gracen ... Amanda
- Peter Wingfield ... Methos
- Jim Byrnes ... Joe Dawson

=== Supporting cast ===
- Michel Albertini ... Raphael Vega
- Boris Anderssen ... Mr. Faith
- Paul Bandey ... Swinson
- Terence Beesley ... Jackie Beaufort
- Diane Bellego ... Elena Moreno
- Andrew Bicknell ... Devon Marek
- Ed Bishop ... Edward Banner
- Benedick Blythe ... Morgan Walker
- Robert Bradford ... Hospital Guard
- Jasper Britton ... Willie Kingsley
- Lisa Butler ... Jillian O'Hara
- Bernard Chabin ... Jose
- Norman Chaucer ... Caruso
- Claudia Christian ... Katherine
- Nicholas Clay ... Loxley
- Dean Cook ... Young Max
- Rowena Cooper ... Berta Symes
- Alain Creff ... Benoit
- Luke D'Silva & Julius D'Silva ... The Brothers Montoya
- Charles Daish ... Grant Thomas
- Roger Daltrey ... Hugh Fitzcairn / 3 episodes
- Alexis Denisof ... Steve Banner
- Anita Dobson ... Molly Ivers
- Sam Douglas ... Baxter
- Danny Dyer ... Andrew
- Jack Ellis ... Bartholomew
- Christian Erickson ... Jack Kendall
- Alice Evans ... Kyra
- Rita Ghosn ... Mia Baptista
- Christophe Guybert ... Pierre
- Michael Halsey ... Milos Vladic
- Adam Henderson ... Shemp
- Sandra Hess ... Reagan Cole
- David Hill ... Rowan Mitchell
- David Hoskin ... Andres Seguy
- Peter Hudson ... James Horton / 4 episodes
- Godfrey James ... Frederick of Godfrey
- Paris Jefferson ... Toni
- Gunilla Karlzen ... Celine
- Alexi Kaye-Campbell ... Dice
- Claire Keim ... Marie
- Stan Kirsch ... Richie Ryan
- Theirry Langerak ... Allan
- Steve Lyon ... Zep
- Emile Ambossolo M'bo ... Jocko
- Martin McDougall ... Liam O'Rourke / 2 episodes
- Kathleen McGoldrick ... Tara
- Bogdan Marian-Stanoevitch ... Sears
- Steven O'Shea ... Nick Sutherland
- Stéphanie Petit ... Lazlo
- Valentine Pelka ... Kronos / 2 episodes
- Olivier Picasso ... Checco
- Brian Protheroe ... Bannock
- Matthew Radford Davies ... William of Godfrey
- Tobias Raineri ... Ramon Castille
- Patrick Rameau ... Bertrand
- Kenan Raven ... Stein
- Rochelle Redfield ... Margo
- Malcolm Rennie ... Drimble
- Malcolm Rennie ... Smythe
- Ian Richardson ... Max Leiner
- Cleo Rocos ... Juliette
- Grant Russell ... Armando Baptista
- David Saracino ... Beck
- John Scarborough ... George Thomas
- Joe Searby ... Gerald LeBlanc
- Rachel Shelley ... Sophie Baines
- Hugh Simon ... Percy Tynebridge
- Jay Simon ... Cameron
- Donald Standen ... Richard Albright
- Deborah Steele ... Marisa
- Dudley Sutton ... Father Robert Beaufort
- Aaron Swartz ... David Leiner
- Louise Taylor ... Amy
- Dara Tomanovich ... Alex Raven
- Jean-Yves Thual ... Ahriman
- Paula Jane Ulrich ... Young Molly Ivers
- Justina Vail ... Katya
- Alexandra Vandernoot ... Tessa Noël / 2 episodes
- Olivier Vitran ... Tom / 2 episodes
- Paulette Williams ... Charlotte
- Alexandre Zambeau ... Terry

== Episodes ==
No. overall	No. in season	Title	Directed by	Written by	Original release date	Prod. code
107	1	"Avatar"	Dennis Berry	David Tynan	October 5, 1997	97601
Once every thousand years, the Zoroastrian demon Ahriman returns to wreak havoc on the earth. He has already brought destruction to Duncan MacLeod's world, having caused Richie Ryan's death at Duncan's hand. But now Duncan returns to Paris to take up his mantle as Champion and vows to destroy Ahriman. Sophie Baines knows how to defeat the demon, but she is killed and reanimated by Ahriman, who threatens to kill her brother Andrew if she does not cooperate. Eventually she tells Duncan, 'Every champion has to find his own way.' When Andrew tries to kill Duncan, Sophie throws herself into the Seine, saving Andrew and thwarting Ahriman.
108	2	"Armageddon"	Richard Martin	Tony DiFranco	October 11, 1997	97602
With the help of Father Robert Beaufort and Joe Dawson, Duncan finally begins to find a crack in Ahriman's armor. But he soon learns, along with Joe, that anyone who helps the Champion becomes fair game for the demon. Joe is torn by guilt as Watchers—friends—are murdered by Ahriman, while Father Beaufort has his own inner demons to contend with. Not even Holy Ground is sanctuary, as Duncan wrestles with Ahriman in the final battle—Armageddon. After helping Father Beaufort face his demons, Duncan faces Ahriman in a dream world and refuses to fight him, instead accepting his darkness as a part of himself. With no power over Duncan, Ahriman is destroyed for good. Joe decides to leave Paris, but persuades Duncan to take back his sword before he left.
109	3	"Sins of the Father"	Dennis Berry	James Thorpe	October 18, 1997	97603
When Duncan's friend, George Thomas, is killed in a car explosion, the Highlander tries to track down the killer and runs into Alex Raven, a beautiful Immortal set upon fulfilling a vow dating back to World War II (flashback: Warsaw, 1942; England, ?) —no matter who gets in her way. Duncan teams up with her and her ward, Max Leiner, to uncover the truth. Max explains that for the past fifty years, he and Alex had been working together to recover the money of victims of the Holocaust, including some stolen by George’s international bank. Eventually, the three learn George wanted to give back the money deposited by Jews, but his grandson, Grant, did not want that, so he set the bomb. Grant dies in his attempt to escape, and the MacLeods finally recover the documents needed to trace the money.
110	4	"Diplomatic Immunity"	Richard Martin	James Thorpe	October 25, 1997	97604
Embezzler, charmer, and con man extraordinaire, Willie Kingsley has a knack for turning up dead—and profiting from it handsomely (flashback: London, 1836; London, 1969). But when one last con goes horribly wrong, resulting in the death of his mortal wife, Kingsley turns to Duncan MacLeod to help him track down her killer. Duncan wants justice; Kingsley wants revenge. Duncan spares Kingsley after a duel and gets him to back off, but their friendship is over.
111	5	"Patient Number 7"	Dennis Berry	David Tynan	November 1, 1997	97605
Police at her heels, killers on her trail, Kyra is on the run, with no memory of who—or what—she is. In the streets of Paris, she runs into Duncan MacLeod, who spins a wild story: That he and Kyra were lovers once, some three hundred years ago (flashback: France, 1640). That she is a soldier, a warrior. That she is Immortal. Kyra eventually is able to regain her memories: she was the bodyguard and girlfriend of Judge Richard Albright. In 1998, Richard worked hard to put behind bars the war criminal Milos Vladic. Although Kyra knew that Vladic was an Immortal, she did not take his head because she thought he must be tried by a court of law. After sentence was handed down, however, Vladic escaped and killed Richard. Kyra fled the assassins but awoke in the hospital with traumatic amnesia. With her memories restored, Kyra tracks Vladic down and kills him.
112	6	"Black Tower"	Richard Martin	Morrie Ruvinsky	November 8, 1997	97606
Four hundred years ago (flashback: Scotland, 1634), Devon Marek was a spoiled aristocrat with a passion for the hunt. After his first death, Duncan told him he had to give up his lands and title when he became Immortal, and when his second death was witnessed, the prediction became true -- and Marek has never forgiven him for it. Now Marek has built a new empire, and he is ready to hunt his most dangerous prey yet: Duncan MacLeod. Obsessed with revenge, Marek has Duncan's date, Margo, kidnapped to lure him into a deadly game: he must rescue her before any of Marek's hired killers can find and kill him. But Margo shoots Duncan, revealing herself as a mole. Duncan flees and Marek kills Margo when she demands her money. Finally, Duncan outsmarts Marek and kills him in a fair fight.
113	7	"Unusual Suspects"	Dennis Berry	Morrie Ruvinsky	November 15, 1997	97607
It's 1929, and Hugh Fitzcairn is enjoying the life of an English lord. He has good friends, a beautiful wife, trusted servants ... until one of his nearest and dearest "murders" him, that is. Now, with the help of his old friend Duncan MacLeod, Fitz is determined to uncover the identity of his own murderer—before more bodies start piling up.
114	8	"Justice"	Richard Martin	Michael O'Mahomey, Sasha Reins	November 22, 1997	97608
When Elena Moreno, the adopted daughter of Immortal Katya is murdered, the courts let the killer—her husband—walk free. Now Katya's an avenging angel, determined to see justice done against Armando Baptista at any cost. Duncan tries to help her, but she goes after Baptista and challenges him to a fencing duel. She wins, but after seeing the despair in her Armando's daughter, she spares him.
115	9	"Deadly Exposure"	Dennis Berry	James Thorpe	January 31, 1998	97609
All bounty hunter Reagan Cole wanted was a holiday in Paris with Duncan MacLeod; what she gets is international intrigue, hunky underwear model Brian “Murph” Murphy, and a terrorist with a million-dollar price on his head. Now, she needs Duncan's assistance to locate the terrorist, Jack Kendal. Flashback: London, 1833. Despite Murph being killed by Kendal’s men, Reagans work together with agent Rowan Mitchell to corner Kendal at a conference event. Kendal unmasks himself, wired with explosives, but Reagan shoots him, and they both fell out the window to be killed by the explosion. Afterwards, despite not receiving the money, Reagan celebrates with Duncan. This episode and the following one ("Two of Hearts") were 'test' episodes of the idea of a Highlander spin-off with a female immortal as the lead.
116	10	"Two of Hearts"	Richard Martin	James Thorpe	February 14, 1998	97610
Centuries ago (flashback: Northern England, 1270), Bartholomew sent thousands to their deaths during the Crusades, amassing a fortune in God's name. Now Katherine is determined to take his head - if only she can keep her mortal husband, Nick, from interfering with the Game. Finding Bartholomew as the CEO of a charity organization called "Mission for Children," which is a front organization to embezzle donations, the two storm his chateau. Nick takes down the bodyguards, while Katherine finally kills Bartholomew. Taking Bartholomew’s thirty million dollars in diamonds, Katherine and Nick decide to donate it to children's charities. This episode and the following one ("Indiscretions") are the only two episodes of Highlander in which Duncan MacLeod does not appear. In this case, none of the regular cast appear.
117	11	"Indiscretions"	Dennis Berry	James Thorpe	May 2, 1998	97611
Methos and Joe Dawson join forces when past indiscretions threaten their lives—and loved ones—in the present. Morgan Walker has been nursing a grudge against Methos for two hundred years, and now he finally saw the chance to take his revenge ... by kidnapping Joe's daughter. Working together, Methos and Joe save her and Methos kills Walker.
118	12	"To Be"	Richard Martin	David Tynan	May 9, 1998	97612
The popular series lays down its sword after six seasons in this stirring finale, in which the past has returned to haunt Duncan MacLeod. In 1946, Duncan got Irish terrorists Liam O’Rourke and Tara Fitzgerald sentenced to life in prison. The mortal Fitzgerald died in prison while the Immortal O’Rourke stayed until she died. After that, he broke out of prison. Now, he has located Duncan, who he blames for the death of Fitzgerald. He kidnaps Joe Dawson and Amanda, to use as bait. After being outclassed, Duncan makes the ultimate sacrifice to save the lives of Amanda and Joe, but Methos interferes and injures O’Rourke. Enraged, O'Rourke pulls out a sub-machine gun and fatally shoots MacLeod, who then receives a vision. In it, he is greeted by Hugh Fitzcairn, who shows him what the world - and his friends' lives - would be like without him. Amanda is a black widow, who gets killed by the Hunters. James Horton, having taken over the Watchers, has rendered Joe penniless and homeless for not joining him. Duncan sees Tessa and assumes she is happy but is wrong.
119	13	"Not To Be"	Dennis Berry	David Tynan	May 16, 1998	97613
Tessa is stuck in a loveless marriage and Fitz died over three hundred years ago. When his fiancé is killed by Horton for trying to stop the killing, Methos rejoins Kronos. The Horsemen recruit Richie Ryan but kill him when he does not live up to their ruthlessness. When Joe refuses to hand over information, he is killed too. Faced with the world that is "not to be" because he lives, Duncan revives in his own reality. Duncan chooses to face O'Rourke, rather than give up his life. Methos eliminates the outside interference, allowing Duncan to fight and kill O'Rourke. In the aftermath, Duncan reflects on his life, thanks his friends for standing by him, and departs into the night for an unknown future. The shot of the mansion in which Tessa lives in this episode is reused footage of the mansion used by Xavier St. Cloud when he was beheaded by Duncan MacLeod in "Unholy Alliance, Part 2". (The 15th episode of the 2nd season.)

== Home media ==
Highlander: The Series Season Six
Set details
Special features
- 13 episodes
- 8-disc set (7 DVDs and 1 CD-ROM)
- 1.33:1 aspect ratio
- English (Dolby Digital 5.1)
- English (Dolby Digital 2.0 Stereo)
- Vast Library of Never-Before-Seen Footage Including Deleted and Alternate Scenes as well as Recently Discovered Footage
- Interviews
- Watcher Chronicles
- Photo Gallery
- Audio Commentaries From: Jim Byrnes, Richard Martin and Peter Wingfield
- 6 Full Length Featurettes:
- Swordmaster: Bob Anderson retrospective
- Finale: Backstage documentary
- Immortal Memories: Season finale retrospective
- 400 Years: The journeys of Duncan MacLeod
- Favorite Quickenings
- La Carrera Panamericana
- All 13 Scripts
- Actor, Director & Writer Bios, Production Notes & Shooting Schedules
Release dates
Region 1
Region 2
February 8, 2005
