= List of Highlander characters =

This is a list of characters from the Highlander franchise.

== Major characters ==
Major characters appear in more than one movie or series. Works are presented in chronological order.

Name	Portrayed by	Appearances	Year(s)
Connor MacLeod	Christopher Lambert	Highlander, Highlander II: The Quickening, Highlander III: The Sorcerer, Highlander: The Series, Highlander: Endgame	1986–2000
The "Highlander" is a 500-year-old Immortal who must fight fearful enemies to win The Prize.
Ramírez	Sean Connery	Highlander, Highlander II: The Quickening	1986–1991
Connor's first mentor, Ramírez is killed by The Kurgan in Highlander. He is revived in Highlander II to help Connor again.
Rachel Ellenstein	Sheila Gish	Highlander, Highlander: Endgame	1986–2000
A war orphan, she is adopted by Connor MacLeod. Through the years their relationship evolves from a father/daughter relationship to a brother/sister one. She is killed by Jacob Kell.
Heather MacLeod	Beatie Edney	Highlander, Highlander: Endgame	1986–2000
Connor's first wife, Heather is a mortal. They live a peaceful life, except the few occasions Immortals interfere, until her death.
Duncan MacLeod	Adrian Paul	Highlander: The Series, Highlander: Endgame, Highlander: The Source	1992–2007
Connor MacLeod's clansman and friend.
Amanda	Elizabeth Gracen	Highlander: The Series, Highlander: The Raven	1992–1999
A 1,200-year-old Immortal, a thief and Duncan's lover on more than one occasion.
Joe Dawson	Jim Byrnes	Highlander: The Series, Highlander: The Raven, Highlander: Endgame, Highlander: The Source	1993–2007
Duncan MacLeod's Watcher. He becomes one of his close friends.
Methos	Peter Wingfield	Highlander: The Series, Highlander: Endgame, Highlander: The Source	1995–2007
The legendary oldest Immortal and Duncan's friend, always ready to advise him.

== Films ==
=== Introduced in Highlander (1986) ===
Name	Portrayed by	Appearance(s)	Year(s)
Connor MacLeod	Christopher Lambert	Highlander, Highlander II: The Quickening, Highlander III: The Sorcerer, Highlander: The Series, Highlander: Endgame	1986–2000
The "Highlander" is a 500-year-old Immortal who must fight fearful enemies to win The Game. Died for the first time in a battle in 1535 in Scotland.
Ramírez	Sean Connery	Highlander, Highlander II: The Quickening	1986–1991
Connor's first mentor, Ramírez is killed by The Kurgan in Highlander. He is revived in Highlander II to help Connor again.
Rachel Ellenstein	Sheila Gish	Highlander, Highlander: Endgame	1986–2000
A war orphan, she is adopted by Connor MacLeod. Through the years their relationship evolves from a father/daughter relationship to a brother/sister one. She is killed by Jacob Kell.
Heather MacLeod	Beatie Edney	Highlander, Highlander: Endgame	1986–2000
Connor's first wife, Heather is a mortal. They live a peaceful life, except the few occasions Immortals interfere, until her death.
The Kurgan	Clancy Brown	Highlander	1986
The most evil and powerful Immortal that ever existed, he faced MacLeod in the 1985 Gathering. In the end, MacLeod was victorious.
Brenda Wyatt	Roxanne Hart	Highlander	1986
Connor MacLeod's second wife. They met in 1985, at the time of "The Gathering", when Connor faced The Kurgan. The means of her death varies by sequel: solar radiation in Highlander II, a car accident in Highlander III, and a hit-and-run by Jacob Kell in Highlander IV (deleted scene).
Angus MacLeod	James Cosmo	Highlander	1986
Connor MacLeod's father, chief of the Scottish clan of MacLeods
Dugal MacLeod	Billy Hartman	Highlander	1986
Cousin of Connor MacLeod from Scottish clan of MacLeods. One of the main leader of the crowd that banished Connor after his first resurrection.
Iman Fasil	Peter Diamond	Highlander	1986
French immortal beheaded as a first of its kind in the original Highlander movie.
Sunda Kastagir	Hugh Quarshie	Highlander	1986
Immortal friend of Connor MacLeod. Killed by Kurgan during gathering.

=== Introduced in Highlander II: The Quickening (1991) ===
Name	Portrayed by	Appearance(s)	Year(s)
Louise Marcus	Virginia Madsen	Highlander II: The Quickening	1991
An environmentalist in 2024, she asks Connor MacLeod to help her take down the evil Shield Corporation, but becomes entangled in Immortal business. After the problems are resolved, she begins a new life with MacLeod.
General Katana	Michael Ironside	Highlander II: The Quickening	1991
General Katana was a madman who ruled the Immortals in the distant past (originally on the planet Zeist in the original cut), exiling many of them into the future (Earth in the original cut) to fight in The Game, being reborn in doing so. When Connor MacLeod won The Prize, Katana journeyed forward in time (from Zeist to Earth in the original cut) in an attempt to slay him personally, but failed, and was beheaded by MacLeod.
Corda	Pete Antico	Highlander II: The Quickening	1991
One of General Katana's Immortal henchmen.
Reno	Peter Bucossi	Highlander II: The Quickening	1991
One of General Katana's Immortal henchmen.

=== Introduced in Highlander III: The Sorcerer (1994) ===
Name	Portrayed by	Appearance	
Nakano	Mako	Highlander III: The Sorcerer	1994
Connor's second mentor and Ramírez former mentor, he was a master of illusion. He was beheaded by Kane.
Kane	Mario Van Peebles	Highlander III: The Sorcerer	1994
Kane was a Mongolian warrior who killed Connor's master, Nakano, and gained from him the power of illusion. He was trapped in a cave for 400 years and challenged MacLeod after escaping. MacLeod killed him.
John MacLeod	Gabriel Kakon	Highlander III: The Sorcerer	1994
Connor and Brenda's adoptive son. After Brenda's death, Connor and John moved to Marrakesh and lived peacefully until Kane's arrival.
Dr. Alexandra Johnson	Deborah Kara Unger	Highlander III: The Sorcerer	1994
She was in charge of the excavations that freed Kane. Her curiosity led her to Connor MacLeod and the two fell in love. After killing Kane and becoming mortal, Connor began a new life with Alex.

=== Introduced in Highlander: Endgame (2000) ===
Name	Portrayed by	Appearance(s)	Year(s)
Kate MacLeod	Lisa Barbuscia	Highlander: Endgame	2000
Duncan MacLeod's only wife, she was Immortal. To trigger her immortality by means of a violent death, Duncan stabbed her on their wedding night. She held a grudge for years until they made peace with each other and restarted their marriage. *Note: In "Darkness", Season 2. It was indicated that Duncan had never married. And Tessa was to have been his first wife before she was killed.
Jacob Kell	Bruce Payne	Highlander: Endgame	2000
Connor's clansman, he burned Connor's mother alive for being the mother of "the devil". Connor killed him and he became Immortal. To make Connor suffer he tried to kill all his loved ones. He targeted Duncan, but ended up losing his head to him.

=== Introduced in Highlander: The Source (2007) ===
Name	Portrayed by	Appearance(s)	Year(s)
Anna Teshemka	Thekla Reuten	Highlander: The Source	2007
The Guardian	Cristian Solimeno	Highlander: The Source	2007
The Guardian was born c.11,000 B.C.E. He was an ancient Immortal of 13,012 years, who was once on search for the mysterious source of Immortality circa 7988 B.C.E. He and the others did not succeed, and he was forced to protect The Source forever.
Cardinal Giovanni	Thom Fell	Highlander: The Source	2007
A very old Immortal, and a high-ranking member of the Roman Catholic Church, he was a Vatican bureaucrat.
Zai Jie	Stephen Rahman-Hughes	Highlander: The Source	2007
Zai Jie was an Immortal who was part of an effort by a cadre of Immortals to find the location of the mysterious Source.
Reggie Weller	Stephen Wight	Highlander: The Source	2007
Reggie Weller was an Immortal working as an astronomer, who was part of the group seeking the mysterious Source in the movie of the same name.

== Series ==
=== Highlander: The Series (1992–1998) ===
The characters listed are those played by the regular and the recurring cast, as well as the guest cast credited in the opening credits. Characters played by guest cast listed in the closing credits are not listed. Characters are listed chronologically by order of appearance.

==== Main characters ====
Name	Portrayed by	Appearance(s)	Episode(s)
Duncan MacLeod	Adrian Paul	Highlander: The Series, Highlander: Endgame, Highlander: The Source	All episodes except "Two of Hearts", "Indiscretions"
Connor MacLeod's clansman and friend.
Richie Ryan	Stan Kirsch	Highlander: The Series	"The Gathering" through "Archangel", "To Be", "Not To Be"
Introduced to the series as a petty criminal, he was revealed to be an Immortal and became Duncan's protégé. He was accidentally killed by Duncan in the episode "Archangel".
Tessa Noël	Alexandra Vandernoot	Highlander: The Series	"The Gathering" through "The Darkness", "Counterfeit, Part 1", "Counterfeit, Part 2", "Leader of the Pack", "To Be", "Not To Be"
Duncan's long-time mortal girlfriend. She was killed by a mugger in the second season episode "The Darkness".
Randi McFarland	Amanda Wyss	Highlander: The Series	"Innocent Man", "Bad Day in Building A", "Deadly Medicine".
Ambitious television reporter, who suspects a mystery around Duncan, Tessa and Richie.
Joe Dawson	Jim Byrnes	Highlander: The Series, Highlander: The Raven, Highlander: Endgame, Highlander: The Source	"The Watchers" through "Not To Be"
Duncan MacLeod's Watcher. He becomes one of his close friends.
Charlie DeSalvo	Philip Akin	Highlander: The Series	"Turnabout" through "Unholy Alliance, Part 2", "The Samurai", "Line of Fire", "The Revolutionary", "Brothers in Arms"
A mortal friend of MacLeod's who did not know about Immortals. He found out about Immortals from Duncan when he was dying from injuries inflicted by Immortal Andrew Cord (Wolfgang Bodison) in the episode "Brother in Arms".
Anne Lindsey	Lisa Howard	Highlander: The Series	"The Revolutionary" through "Mortal Sins", "Reunion", "The Blitz"
A mortal doctor who was Duncan's girlfriend in the third season. In the beginning she was unaware of Immortals, later, however, she found out about Immortals, and being unable to deal with it she and Duncan separated, but remained good friends.

==== Recurring characters ====
Name	Portrayed by	Episode	Year(s)
Sergeant Thomas Powell	Wendell Wright	"The Gathering", "The Road Not Taken", "Innocent Man"	1992
A Seacouver police officer whose cases seemed to always involve MacLeod and Richie.
Ian MacLeod	Matthew Walker	"Family Tree", "Homeland", "Prophecy"	1992–1996
Duncan MacLeod's foster father.
Angie Burke	Christianne Hirt	"Family Tree", "Revenge Is Sweet"	1992
Richie Ryan's oldest friend and a former biker/heavy metal groupie.
Commissioner Stanley "Stosh" Cominski	Jay Brazeau	"Free Fall", "Bad Day in Building A"	1992
A Seacouver police officer who suspected of MacLeod's involvement in several crimes.
Sam Thompson	Leslie Carlson	"Free Fall", "Deadly Medicine"	1992
A renaissance man whose technical and computer skills help get Duncan MacLeod out of his predicaments.
Sergeant Ray Bennett	Tim Reid	"Revenge Is Sweet", "See No Evil", "Eyewitness"	1992
A Seacouver police officer whose investigations always had Duncan MacLeod as a suspect or witness.
Darius	Werner Stocker	"Band of Brothers", "For Tomorrow We Die", "The Beast Below", "Saving Grace", "The Hunters"	1993
A 2,000-year-old Immortal who lived as a monk who was beheaded by Hunter James Horton.
Inspector Raymond LeBrun	Hugues Leforestier	"For Evil's Sake", "For Tomorrow We Die", "Saving Grace"	1993
A French inspector whose cases always had Duncan MacLeod as a suspect or witness.
Xavier St. Cloud	Roland Gift	"For Tomorrow We Die", "Unholy Alliance, Part 1", "Unholy Alliance, Part 2", "Finale, Part 1", "Double Jeopardy"	1993–1996
MacLeod's archenemy in the first two seasons; he was killed by MacLeod in "Unholy Alliance, Part 2".
Amanda	Elizabeth Gracen	"The Lady and The Tiger", "The Return of Amanda", "Legacy", "The Cross of St. Antoine", "Rite of Passage", "Finale, Part 1", "Finale, Part 2", "Double Eagle", "Reunion", "The Colonel", "Methuselah's Gift", "The Immortal Cimoli", "Dramatic License", "Money No Object", "The Stone of Scone", "Forgive Us Our Trespasses", "To Be", "Not To Be"	1993–1998
A 1,200 year old Immortal, a thief and Duncan's lover on more than one occasion.
Hugh Fitzcairn	Roger Daltrey	"The Hunters", "Star-Crossed", "Till Death", "The Stone of Scone", "Unusual Suspects", "To Be", "Not To Be"	1993–1998
Duncan MacLeod's Immortal friend; he was beheaded by Kalas in the episode ("Star-Crossed").
James Horton	Peter Hudson	"The Hunters", "The Watchers", "Unholy Alliance, Part 1", "Unholy Alliance, Part 2", "Counterfeit, Part 1", "Counterfeit, Part 2", "One Minute to Midnight", "To Be", "Not To Be"	1993–1998
A renegade Watcher, Horton was the leader of The Hunters, a group of Watchers whose goal was to kill Immortals. He became obsessed in killing MacLeod but died at his hands in "Counterfeit, Part 2".
Carl Robinson	Bruce A. Young	"Run For Your Life", "Manhunt"	1993–1996
An African-American Immortal friend of MacLeod's who was once a slave.
Kenny	Myles Ferguson	"The Lamb", "Reunion"	1994–1995
An 800-year-old Immortal, with a body of a ten-year-old boy. He tried to behead MacLeod twice in the third and fourth season but failed and was able to escape.
Renee Delaney	Stacey Travis	"Unholy Alliance, Part 1", "Unholy Alliance, Part 2", "Double Jeopardy"	1994–1996
An Army CID agent investigating the many headless bodies constantly appearing whenever Duncan MacLeod is around.
Maurice Lalonde	Michel Modo	"Unholy Alliance, Part 2", "Warmonger", "Pharaoh's Daughter", "Legacy", "Prodigal Son", "Star-Crossed", "Take Back the Night", "Reasonable Doubt", "Finale, Part 1", "The Modern Prometheus"	1994–1997
A mortal friend of MacLeod's who lived in a boat next to Duncan's barge in Paris and later owned a restaurant and a jazz bar. He was the comic relief in most episodes.
Kalas	David Robb	"Song of the Executioner", "Star-Crossed", "Methos", "Finale, Part 1", "Finale, Part 2"	1995
MacLeod's archenemy, in the third season, who was killed by MacLeod in "Finale, Part 2".
Methos	Peter Wingfield	"Methos", "Finale, Part 1", "Finale, Part 2", "Chivalry", "Timeless", "Deliverance", "Methuselah's Gift", "Through a Glass, Darkly", "Till Death", "Judgement Day", "One Minute to Midnight", "The Messenger", "The Valkyrie", "Comes a Horseman", "Revelation 6:8", "Forgive Us Our Trespasses", "The Modern Prometheus", "Archangel", "Indiscretions", "To Be", "Not To Be"	1995–1998
The legendary oldest Immortal and Duncan's friend, always ready to advise him.
Rebecca Horne	Nadia Cameron	"Legacy"	1994
Amanda's first teacher. She was killed by fellow student Luther (Emile Abossolo M'Bo) in the episode "Legacy".
Cassandra	Tracy Scoggins	"Prophecy", "Comes a Horseman", "Revelation 6:8"	1996–1997
A 3,000-year-old Immortal known as the Witch of Donan Woods who possessed magic abilities.
Kronos	Valentine Pelka	"Comes a Horseman", "Revelation 6:8", "Not To Be"	1997–1998
Kronos was part of the Four Horsemen along with Methos, Silas and Caspian — the most terrible Immortals that ever existed. MacLeod killed him in the episode "Revelation 6:8".
Caspian	Marcus Testory	"Comes a Horseman", "Revelation 6:8"	1997
Caspian was part of the Four Horsemen along with Methos, Silas, and Kronos — the most terrible Immortals that ever existed. MacLeod killed him in the episode "Revelation 6:8".
Silas	Richard Ridings	"Comes a Horseman", "Revelation 6:8"	1997
Silas was part of the Four Horsemen along with Methos, Caspian, and Kronos — the most terrible Immortals that ever existed. Methos killed him in the episode "Revelation 6:8".
Ahriman	Peter Hudson	"Armageddon"	1997
The evil Zoroastrian demon prophesied to be destroyed by a chosen one: Duncan MacLeod. He was destroyed by MacLeod in "Armaggedon".

==== Immortals ====
Name	Portrayed by	Appearance(s)	Year(s)
Connor MacLeod	Christopher Lambert	"The Gathering"	1992
The "Highlander" is a 450-year-old Immortal who must fight fearful enemies to win The Game.
Slan Quince	Richard Moll	"The Gathering"	1992
Evil Immortal who goes head hunting full time.
Kiem Sun	Soon-Tek Oh	"The Road Not Taken"	1992
A Chinese Immortal who brews a potion to win the Game.
Howard Crowley	John Novak	"Innocent Man"	1992
An immortal sheriff who uses his star to play the Game.
Felicia Martins	Joan Jett	"Free Fall"	1992
An immortal woman who holds a grudge against fellow Immortal Claude Devereux.
Caleb Cole	Marc Singer	"Mountain Men"	1992
An immortal poacher who tried to kidnap Tessa Noel.
Carl The Hermit	John Dennis Johnston	"Mountain Men"	1992
An immortal woodsman Duncan MacLeod met in the 19th century.
Alexei Voshin	Stephen Macht	"The Sea Witch"	1992
An immortal smuggler who betrayed Duncan MacLeod in 1938.
Walter Reinhardt	Christoph M. Ohrt	"Revenge Is Sweet"	1992
An immortal business shark who has been Duncan MacLeod's enemy for centuries.
Marcus Korolus	J. G. Hertzler	"See No Evil"	1992
An immortal actor who became a serial killer after having been burnt at the stake.
Andrew Ballin	Tom Butler	"Eyewitness"	1993
An immortal police chief witnessed committing murder by Tessa.
Grayson	James Horan	"Band of Brothers"	1993
A warlord and former pupil of Darius'.
Christoph Kuyler	Peter Howitt	"For Evil's Sake"	1993
An acrobat and professional killer.
Ursa	Christian Van Acker	"The Beast Below"	1993
A tall, gentle immortal who loves flowers and beauty.
Grace Chandel	Julia Stemberger	"Saving Grace"	1993
A doctor and scientist who helped a mother to give birth to a daughter with Duncan MacLeod's help in 1660.
Carlo Sendaro	Georges Corraface	"Saving Grace"	1993
A jealous and possessive drug baron.
Zachary Blaine	Jason Isaacs	"The Lady and the Tiger"	1993
An acrobat, thief and Amanda's part-time partner.
Gabriel Piton	Nigel Terry	"Eye of the Beholder"	1993
A fashion designer who steals beautiful artifacts and jewels for his private collection.
Alfred Cahill	Martin Kemp	"Avenging Angel"	1993
An ex-SAS commando who becomes crazy when discovering his immortality and goes to a crusade for morality.
Everett Bellian	Peter Guinness	"Nowhere to Run"	1993
An old soldier who exerts brutal justice against his foster daughter's rapist.
Gregor Powers	Joel Wyner	"Studies in Light"	1993
A doctor and photograph artist who becomes nihilist and loses his emotions.
Michael Moore / Quenten Barnes	Geraint Wyn Davies	"Turnabout"	1993
Michael Moore is a psychiatrist who suffers from multiple personality disorder. Quenten Barnes is Moore's evil side.
Annie Devlin	Sheena Easton	"Eye For An Eye"	1993
An Irish independence activist who fights for her cause.
Thomas Sullivan	Bruce Weitz	"The Fighter"	1994
An immortal interested in boxing.
Mako	Jonathan Banks	"Under Color of Authority"	1994
A ruthless sheriff and fanatic lawman. He regarded the law as sacred and spent his entire life enforcing it, regardless of whether or not the accused was actually innocent.
Marcus Constantine	James Faulkner	"Pharaoh's Daughter"	1994
A museum curator and former Roman general.
Nefertiri	Nia Peeples	"Pharaoh's Daughter"	1994
Cleopatra's maid who spent two thousand years in a sarcophagus.
Michelle Webster	Gabrielle Miller	"Rite Of Passage"	1994
A new Immortal and the daughter of a friend of Duncan's, who resists learning what it takes to live as an Immortal.
Axel Whittaker	Rob Stewart	"Rite Of Passage"	1994
A seducer who uses young female Immortals to win heads.
Sharon Collins	Alexa Gilmour	"Rite Of Passage"	1994
A young Immortal used by Axel Whittaker.
Dallman Ross	Eric Keenleyside	"The Lamb"	1994
An Immortal who chased Kenny.
Sean Zale	Jesse Moss	"The Lamb"	1994
An immortal child soldier.
May-Ling Shen	Vivian Wu	"They Also Serve"	1995
Kiem Sun's master in martial arts.
Michael Christian	Barry Pepper	"They Also Serve"	1995
Head hunter associated with his Watcher.
Kanwulf	Carsten Norgaard	"Homeland"	1995
Pillager who killed Duncan MacLeod's father.
Andrew Cord	Wolfgang Bodison	"Brothers in Arms"	1995
Soldier who was Joe Dawson's commanding officer during the Vietnam War and saved Joe's life.
Kit O'Brady	Nicholas Campbell	"Double Eagle"	1995
Unfortunate saloon owner.
Alan Wells	Phil Hayes	"The Innocent"	1995
An Immortal friend and protector of Mikey Bellows.
Tyler King	Callum Keith Rennie	"The Innocent"	1995
Head hunter.
Mikey Bellows	Pruitt Taylor Vince	"The Innocent"	1995
Mentally challenged Immortal who likes trains.
Kristin Gilles	Ann Turkel	"Chivalry"	1995
An old fling of Duncan MacLeod's, whom he cannot bring himself to kill.
Coltec	Byron Chief-Moon	"Something Wicked"	1996
An immortal heyoka who takes the evil of the world upon himself.
Horvan Kant	Darcy Laurie	"Something Wicked"	1996
A ruthless head hunter and sociopath.
Bryce Korland	Benjamin Ratner	"Something Wicked"	1996
A poet killed by Coltec.
Sean Burns	Michael J. Jackson	"Deliverance"	1996
He was an Immortal dedicated to healing the mind and was a friend of MacLeod's. Burns was beheaded by Duncan when he was under the influence of the Dark Quickening.
Danny Cimoli	Crispin Bonham-Carter	"The Immortal Cimoli"	1996
Immortal who refused to learn the rules of the Game and got beheaded without being able to defend himself.
Damon Case	Simon Kunz	"The Immortal Cimoli"	1996
Head hunter.
Vrej Ratavoussian	T.C. Holmes	"The Immortal Cimoli"	1996
Kills Danny Cimoli.
Morgan D'Estaing	Marc Warren	"Double Jeopardy"	1996
A jewel thief and former pupil of Xavier St. Cloud.
Cory Raines	Nicholas Lea	"Money No Object"	1996
Amanda's old partner in crime, a bank robber who gives to the poor.
Graham Ashe	Chris Humphreys	"The End of Innocence"	1996
Duncan MacLeod's early teacher and mentor. Also mentor to Juan Sánchez Villa-Lobos Ramírez. Humiliated and beheaded by Haresh Clay in 1657.
Matthew McCormick	Eric McCormack	"Manhunt"	1996
Carl Robinson's teacher.
Lord Byron	Jonathan Firth	"The Modern Prometheus"	1997
A rock star and poet.
Katherine	Claudia Christian	"Two of Hearts"	1998
An immortal committed to help children in need.
Bartholomew	Jack Ellis	"Two of Hearts"	1998
An immortal supposedly committed to help children in need, but takes the money for himself.
Liam O'Rourke	Martin McDougall	"To Be", "Not to Be"	1998
An Irish nationalist and terrorist.

=== Highlander: The Raven (1998–1999) ===
==== Main characters ====
Name	Portrayed by	Appearance(s)	Year(s)
Amanda	Elizabeth Gracen	All episodes	1998–1999
A 1200-year-old Immortal, a thief and Duncan's lover on more than one occasion.
Nick Wolfe	Paul Johansson	All episodes	1998–1999
An ex-cop who befriended Amanda and together solved crimes. He was the co-star of Highlander: The Raven.

==== Recurring characters ====
Name	Portrayed by	Appearance(s)	Year(s)
Lucy Becker	Patricia Gage	"Reborn", "Full Disclosure", "Bloodlines", "Immunity", "Crime and Punishment", "The Unknown Soldier", "Cloak and Dagger", "Passion Play", "The Devil You Know"	1998
Amanda's old mortal friend.
Carl Magnus	Michael Copeman	"Reborn", "Full Disclosure", "Birthright", "Crime and Punishment", "The Unknown Soldier", "The Devil You Know"	1998
Nick's former boss.
Basil Morgan	Julian Richings	"Reborn", "Birthright"	1998
Amanda's fence.
Bert Myers	Hannes Jaenicke	"Bloodlines", "Immunity", "Cloak and Dagger", "The French Connection", "The Rogue", "Love and Death"	1998–1999
Nick's current boss and friend.
Chase MacAffee	Catherine Bruhier	"So Shall Ye Reap", "Cloak and Dagger"	1998
A journalist.
Officer Robbins	Melanie Nicholls-King	"The Unknown Soldier", "Passion Play"	1998
A policewoman and ex-colleague of Nick.
Andre Korda	Valentine Pelka	"A Matter of Time", "The French Connection"	1999
An immortal crime boss and Amanda's former teacher.
Father Liam Riley	Robert Cavanah	"The French Connection", "Inferno", "The Frame", "Love and Death", "War and Peace"	1999
An Immortal priest who lives in Paris.
Pascal	Marc Pierret	"Love and Death", "The Ex-Files"	1999
An employee of Amanda's at The Sanctuary.

==== Guest cast ====
Name	Portrayed by	Appearance(s)	Year(s)
Crysta	Ellen Dubin	"French Connection"	1999
Andre Korda's associate who lost her head to Amanda.
Derrick Markham	Stephen Billington	"French Connection"	1999
Amanda's evil ex-husband who was killed by Amanda.
Joe Dawson	Jim Byrnes	"French Connection"	1999
Duncan MacLeod's Watcher. He becomes one of his close friends.
