= Connor MacLeod =

Lead character of the Highlander franchise

- Highlander character
- First appearance: Highlander (1986)
- Portrayed by: Christopher Lambert (original series); Henry Cavill (reboot)

In-universe information
- Born: 1518, Glenfinnan, Scottish Highlands
- First death: 1536
- Teacher: Juan Sánchez-Villalobos Ramírez; Nakano the Sorcerer

Connor MacLeod, also known as The Highlander, is a fictional character in the Highlander film series, and appears in the extended franchise of the television programs: Highlander: The Series and Highlander: The Animated Series. In the films and live-action series, he is portrayed by Christopher Lambert.

The Highlander franchise covers different fictional timelines. Though his fate is different in each of these timelines, generally Connor MacLeod's origins remain the same: he is a man born in the Scottish Highlands in the 16th century who becomes ageless after his first death in 1536. He later learns he is one of several immortals born with an energy called "the Quickening", unable to die unless beheaded. If he beheads another immortal, he will absorb the power of their Quickening, and for this reason many of his kind hunt each other in "the Game" where the winner will win the collective power of all immortals who lived, a "Prize" that can make them ruler of the Earth. Connor is taught about his nature and how to fight by another immortal named Juan Sánchez-Villalobos Ramírez (played in the films by Sean Connery). The film Highlander III: The Sorcerer revealed a second immortal mentor, a sorcerer named Nakano.

The film Highlander II: The Quickening introduced an alternate backstory that said Connor was an alien, while a later version of the same film said he was born in Earth's distant past before recorded history, then sent forward to the 16th century. Highlander II is generally regarded as outside the canon of the rest of the franchise.

== Character concept ==
The character of Connor MacLeod and his role as an immortal swordsman was the creation of scriptwriter Gregory Widen. Widen was studying film at University of California, Los Angeles (UCLA) and working on a class writing project. Widen was inspired by a vacation to Scotland and England, as well as the 1977 Ridley Scott film The Duellists. According to Widen, "the idea of the story was basically a combination of a riff on The Duellists — guy wants to finish a duel over years — and a visit I made both to Scotland and the Tower of London armor display, where I thought, 'What if you owned all this? What if you'd worn it all through history, and were giving someone a tour of your life through it?' That scene is basically in the movie." According to William Panzer, producer of Highlander: The Series: "And that's where everything fell into place — the idea that there are Immortals and they were in conflict with each other, leading secret lives that the rest of us are unaware of."

Widen decided to make the immortal protagonist MacLeod relatable by depicting him as someone who experiences emotional loss and loneliness due to his power, falling in love with people and forging friendships but knowing he will eventually outlast and lose them all. He was also an underdog in the story, one who wasn't as old, experienced, powerful, or physically intimidating as the enemy he would have to face in the story's climax. Widen's instructor advised him to send in the class project script to an agent. It became the first draft of what would eventually be the screenplay for the 1986 film Highlander. In a 2006 interview with The Action Elite, Gregory Widen remarked: "I’ve always been amazed that a project I wrote as a UCLA student has had this kind of life. I think its appeal is the uniqueness of how the story was told and the fact it had a heart and a point of view about immortality."

As the film readied for production, Kurt Russell was cast as Connor Macleod beating Michael Douglas, Ed Harris, Sam Shepard, David Keith, Kevin Costner, Scott Glenn, Sting (who was also considered to provide the soundtrack for the movie), Mickey Rourke, Peter Weller, Mel Gibson and William Hurt; however, Russell dropped out of the film at the insistence of Goldie Hawn. Russell Mulcahy, director of Highlander, became interested in actor Christopher Lambert after seeing a photograph of the 28-year-old actor in his portrayal of Tarzan in Greystoke: The Legend of Tarzan, Lord of the Apes. At the Neuchâtel International Fantastic Film Festival in 2015, Mulcahy said he saw the photo in a magazine and showed the production staff: "I said, 'Who's this?' They had no idea. He couldn't speak English. But he had the perfect look. And he learned English very fast."

Mulcahy met with Christopher Lambert and decided to cast him. In preparation to play Connor MacLeod, Lambert spent months working with a dialect coach (four hours each morning) and sword-training with Bob Anderson (four hours each afternoon) who had been a Darth Vader stunt double in the Star Wars franchise. During an interview regarding the characters he played in Highlander, Fortress and Greystoke, Lambert remarked that these heroes "all have one thing in common: that is that they will never give up. If they have to die for a cause, they would go for it because the purpose is not themselves, it's the other people... You can't win if you don't try, so you've gotta try."

Gregory Widen had originally envisioned Connor as a very serious, grim character following centuries of violence and loss. The film however portrayed MacLeod as a person who has suffered loss and fears new attachments but who still pursues the possibility of love, maintains a sense of humor about life, and adopts a daughter whom he tells to keep hope and remain optimistic. In a 2016 interview with HeyUGuys, Lambert said he found Connor MacLeod appealing for still having humor and hope despite his long life and many losses: "It's the only role that I have played that is touching on the subject of immortality, through a character carrying five hundred years of violence, pain, love, and suffering on his shoulders, who is still walking around and being positive. That is what amazed me about him the most... It's difficult living through one life but to see all the people around you dying over and over. How do you cope with that pain? How do you have the strength to keep on walking, to keep being positive and optimistic? To be capable of falling in love again when you know the pain it creates when you lose them."

In a 2016 interview with The Guardian, Lambert said he reflected on Connor MacLeod following the loss of his own brother: "When my brother died of cancer, I had the same feeling I had during Highlander, with its idea that you cannot get the past back – life has to go on. If Connor MacLeod can get through five or six lifetimes, we should be able to manage one."

== Film continuity ==
=== Highlander (1986) ===
In the first Highlander movie, it is established that immortals are rare human beings born with "the Quickening." Once they have experienced their First Death, they will stop aging and heal from any wound except the loss of their head. The Quickening connects them to nature and allows them to sense each other, and one immortal can absorb the Quickening power of another if they behead them. For this reason, some immortals hunt each other, a "Game" with only one rule: never fight on holy ground. It is said that when only a few immortals are left, they will be drawn to "a faraway land" to fight for the Prize: the combined power of all immortals before them, granting enough power and knowledge to enslave humanity.

Connor MacLeod is born in 1518 in Glenfinnan, Scotland near the shores of Loch Shiel. In 1536, he enters his first battle when the Clan MacLeod fights the Clan Fraser. An immortal known as The Kurgan allies with Clan Fraser, sensing MacLeod is an immortal and deciding to take his head before the young man learns his true nature and becomes an experienced fighter. Kurgan delivers a fatal wound but is attacked by others of the Clan MacLeod before he can take Connor's head. After he recovers fully healed, Connor's family and lover accuse him of witchcraft and demand he be burned at the stake. Clan chieftain Angus MacLeod decides to simply banish Connor. The exiled man roams the Scottish Highlands, eventually becoming a blacksmith and marrying Heather MacDonald in 1539. In 1541, he meets the immortal Egyptian Juan Sánchez-Villalobos Ramírez, who teaches him his true nature and how to fight. While Connor only wants a family and a quiet life, Ramírez informs him immortals cannot have children and argues it is their duty to make sure evil people such as the Kurgan don't win the Prize. "In the end, there can be only one."

While Connor is away one night, the Kurgan duels Ramírez and kills him, then rapes Heather before leaving, thinking MacLeod has moved on from Scotland. After Heather dies of old age, Connor wanders the world, adopting the katana of Ramírez as his own. During World War II, he rescues a young Jewish girl named Rachel Ellenstein from Nazis, adopting her as a daughter. By 1985, the immortal Highlander is living in New York as an antique dealer called "Russell Nash".

In 1985, the Gathering occurs, while Connor meets forensics scientist Brenda Wyatt who uncovers his true nature. When the Kurgan and the Highlander are the last two immortals left alive, Brenda witnesses their final battle. Connor wins the Prize, becoming a mortal man who can have children and gaining the power to know the thoughts and dreams of all human beings. Returning to Scotland with Brenda, he is relieved that the Game is over and hopes to unite the world and help people reach greater understanding of each other.

=== Highlander II: The Quickening (1991) ===
During filming, the studio took control of the project and the story. Highlander II: The Quickening was released in 1991 and met with negative responses. A director's cut called Highlander II: Renegade Version was released in 1995, altering parts of the story. Both versions contradict parts of the original film.

1991 version – The film reveals that Connor MacLeod and Ramírez were originally born 500 years ago on the planet Zeist and were members of a revolution against the tyrant General Katana. Now depicted as a sorcerer-like figure, Ramírez declares MacLeod the leader of the revolution and then creates a bond between them both via "the ancient power of the Quickening," which he explains is magic. He later says not even death can break this bond. Katana captures the revolutionaries and the priests of Zeist exile them all to the planet Earth where they will become immortal. They can only end their ageless exile by battling each other until the last survivor wins the Prize. The victor may then choose to either return to Zeist or remain on Earth but now as a mortal. It is not explained how the trip to Earth makes someone from Zeist immortal nor why the priests and government of Zeist would choose to give revolutionaries this power instead of simply executing them as enemies of the state. It is said that although Connor won the Prize in 1985 by killing the Kurgan and now ages as a mortal, he has not yet actually declared his choice and thus still has the opportunity to decide to return to Zeist before he dies.

Years after Connor wins the Prize, the ozone layer is destroyed by industrial pollution, causing the deaths of many (it is implied MacLeod's wife Brenda died as a result of this as well but this is not clear). The now-mortal Connor uses his considerable wealth to supervise the creation of the Shield, an energy barrier protecting Earth from solar radiation while the ozone layer can have time to heal. The barrier also hides the sun, stars, and sky from view, contributing to greater depression worldwide as well as a halt to space exploration. Eventually, the shield comes under the control of The Shield Corporation (TSC), which charges countries for protection from solar radiation. By 2024, Connor MacLeod is an old man and society has declined into widespread corruption and poverty. On Zeist, Katana decides to kill MacLeod rather than chance that the man will change his mind and return to their planet. He sends two assassins to Earth, who become immortal as a result. Killing them, MacLeod regains his youth. The film then follows his fight against Katana (who also comes to Earth) and The Shield Corporation after he discovers the ozone layer has already been healed for years. He is aided by political activist Louise Marcus, who becomes his lover, and by Ramírez, who is resurrected when Connor summons him with the mystical Quickening. Ramírez later sacrifices himself to help MacLeod escape a deadly trap. The film ends with MacLeod beheading Katana and deactivating the Shield. Mortal once more, Connor is content to start a new life with Louise.

In the TV cut of this film, Connor's reasons for creating the Shield are further explained. The ending was expanded to show him returning to Zeist with Louise accompanying him.

Highlander II: Renegade Version / Highlander II: Special Edition – In recut versions of the film, all verbal mention of Zeist is removed. The flashback scenes of Zeist are now said to take place on Earth in a society that existed but was lost before recorded history, a forgotten time when people utilized both magic and advanced technology. In this version of events, Ramírez and MacLeod are already immortals who can only die by beheading due to each being born with the Quickening. Ramírez is still a man who forms a connection with MacLeod through magic, though he no longer calls it the Quickening. He and MacLeod, along with others, are still revolutionaries opposed to General Katana, now also said to be an immortal. In the revised trial scene, the Priests and their Chief Justice mention that the immortal revolutionaries, as well as other immortal criminals, will be exiled into the far future where they will fight each other in trial by combat. The winner may then remain in the future as a mortal being to live out their days or return to the past with their immortality intact and their freedom restored by amnesty.

The film added footage with MacLeod visiting Brenda Wyatt at her deathbed in 1995. To better explain why Connor became so personally involved in the creation of the Shield, a new scene shows Brenda on her deathbed asking him to promise her he'll find a way to save humanity from the deadly solar radiation. The film also fixed a continuity error in the previous film by dividing two different sword fights that had been previously merged into one. A scene is added where Louise and Connor go above the shield and confirm the ozone layer has been repaired before making their final attack. The ending is slightly different, indicating that Connor destroys the shield by releasing his Quickening energy into it, possibly becoming mortal again in the process.

=== Highlander III: The Sorcerer (1994) ===
This film, also called Highlander: The Final Dimension, acts as an alternate sequel to the original movie and erases the canon of Highlander II by confirming Connor was born in 16th century Scotland. The movie says Brenda Wyatt died in a car crash in 1987 after being married to Connor for two years, resulting in a new timeline that ignores the events of the second film (Highlander II depicted Brenda dying in 1995 from solar radiation poisoning).

The film begins by revealing that after the death of his first wife Heather in the late 16th century, Connor travels to Japan to meet the immortal sorcerer Nakano, a master of illusion and old acquaintance of Ramírez. In a cave in Mount Niri, Nakano teaches Connor how to fight with Ramírez's katana. The evil immortal Kane and two immortal soldiers arrive and kill Nakano, but the sorcerer casts a spell as his Quickening is released. As MacLeod escapes, the cave is destroyed and buried, and Kane and his two soldiers are frozen by the magic, effectively removing them from the Game and preventing them from joining the Gathering in 1985. Further flashback scenes reveal MacLeod falling in love with Sarah Barrington in 18th century France, but she marries someone else and has children with them after she mistakenly believes Connor died during the French Revolution.

In 1994, the cave of Nakano is discovered by archaeologist Dr. Alexandra Johnson (who looks like Sarah Barrington). The cave being disturbed awakens Kane and his henchmen. Kane, now possessing Nakano's sorcery, immediately kills one of his men to gain power while sending the other to track down MacLeod. In Marrakesh, Morocco, Connor is raising his adopted son John in peace when he senses a release of the Quickening and realizes the Game is not over. His suspicions are confirmed when he meets and kills Kane's other soldier. Investigating Nakano, Alex finds Connor and realizes he is immortal. After his katana is destroyed in battle, Connor uses refined steel from Nakano's cave to forge a new katana. Kane later kidnaps John to draw out Connor. The Highlander duels Kane and kills him, gaining his power and finally ending the Game. He then leaves to start a new life with John and Alex.

== Live-action TV series continuity ==
The live-action TV series takes place after the events of the original 1985 movie in another alternate timeline. In this timeline, the events of the original film still happened with one major change: Connor did not win the Prize when he killed Kurgan because there were still several immortals remaining on Earth. Christopher Lambert declined to reprise his movie role for a weekly series, and so the show cast Adrian Paul to be the protagonist. Believing the show needed to create its own hero and avoid negative comparison to Lambert's performance, Paul suggested creating a new immortal Scottish Highlander. The first episode, "The Gathering", introduced Paul as Duncan MacLeod, an immortal born in the Clan MacLeod decades after Connor's exile. Lambert appeared as Connor in the very first episode, revealed to be Duncan's first immortal mentor and practically a brother to the man. After this guest appearance, Connor never appeared again in the TV series but was occasionally mentioned with respect. Duncan later recalls that Connor "taught me how to live".

=== Highlander: The Series (1992-1998) ===
The show's first two episodes, along with the later movie Highlander: Endgame, explain that Duncan MacLeod was a boy adopted into the Clan MacLeod roughly 75 years after Connor's birth. Like Connor, Duncan dies in battle only to miraculously revive, leading the clan to banish him because it is believed he is a demon or changeling. Soon after this, Duncan discovers he was adopted (although his mother considers him no less her son) but never learns his true parentage. Connor MacLeod returns to Scotland in 1625 and finds Duncan, training him in sword fighting and teaching him what it means to be immortal. The two become close friends, though their personalities sometimes clash and eventually they go separate ways, only occasionally reuniting. By the 1990s, when the series opens, Duncan owns an antique shop in the fictional city of Seacouver, Washington, just as Connor owned an antique shop in the first movie. His co-owner is artist Tessa Noël, who has been in a relationship with Duncan for a decade and knows he is immortal. In the first episode, the two meet troubled youth Richie Ryan, who witnesses the arrival of the evil immortal Quince and Duncan's clansman Connor. Realizing that Tessa knows about immortality but not about the Game or the Prize, Connor lectures Duncan on believing he can live a life without worrying about other immortals that may wish to hunt him. After defeating Quince, Duncan believes he must separate from Tessa and romantic attachment in order to keep her safe from the violence of his immortal life, but Connor disagrees. He advises Duncan to mentor Richie and reunites the man with Tessa, then leaves to follow his own path. Duncan, Tessa, and Richie become a close group. Together, they share several adventures dealing with evil immortals who target Duncan, helping immortals who consider Duncan their friend, and providing aid to ordinary people they come across.

The TV series introduces the Watchers, humans who record the lives and battles of immortals. It is revealed that Connor was studied from afar by many Watchers, including three named Alistair MacDougal, Nathaniel Post, and Dana Brooks. The second-season episode "Watchers" (1993) confirms the battle from Highlander between Connor and the Kurgan in 1985 did happen in the TV series canon. It is mentioned that many Watchers were relieved when Connor killed the Kurgan, fearing humanity would suffer greatly if the villain survived long enough to win the Prize. The series also references Duncan meeting a mentor and a student of Connor's mentor Ramírez.

=== Highlander: Endgame (2000) ===
The theatrical film Highlander: Endgame follows the continuity of the live-action TV series. No reference is made to the events of Highlander III: The Sorcerer or to Connor's adopted son John from that film. According to the film, the TV series continuity version of Connor MacLeod has beheaded 262 immortals by the year 2000. Highlander: Endgame shows more of Connor and Duncan's shared past and reveals Connor's mother was ultimately executed by the Clan MacLeod for not disavowing her son after his banishment. On the night of her execution, Connor tries to save her but fails. Kneeling over her, Connor is startled by a priest and then kills in a rage. The priest's adopted son Jacob Kell later discovers he too is immortal and swears vengeance. Jacob Kell hunts many immortals across the centuries, often cheating by ignoring the rules of the Game.

In 1990, Connor is on his way to visit his adopted daughter Rachel Ellenstein at his old antique shop. Kell uses a bomb to destroy it and Connor's old apartment, killing Rachel inside. Overcome by depression and disillusioned with his ageless life, Connor immediately leaves the Game and the world in general by entering a place called the Sanctuary, where he and other like-minded immortals are kept in a near-coma state, looked after by a group of Watchers who believe there must always be at least two immortals so no one wins the Prize and possibly dominates humanity.

Ten years later when the film takes place, Jacob Kell's activities force Connor to leave the Sanctuary. Unwilling to see anyone else he loves die, and believing neither he nor Duncan are powerful enough to stop Kell in a proper duel, Connor attacks the younger MacLeod, insisting Duncan to take his power and knowledge. Refusing at first, Duncan sees Connor will not change his mind and is tired of life. As Connor says, "Goodbye, Duncan, my true brother", Duncan beheads him. During his subsequent fight with Kell, Duncan momentarily takes on Connor's voice and appearance. With his newly increased power, Duncan kills Kell. He then buries Connor in the Scottish Highlands next to his first wife Heather and his mentor Ramírez.

With his character's death, Christopher Lambert departed the franchise after Endgame. Connor isn't seen or mentioned in the sequel, Highlander: The Source.

Some fans have argued the film must take place in 2004 in order for the events of Highlander III to have still happened to Connor, but the film itself makes no mention of taking place in the near future nor that this version of Connor has an adopted son he would've had to abandon in order to live in the Sanctuary in the early 1990s. Just as Highlander III took place in a continuity that doesn't acknowledge the TV series and actively contradicts it, Highlander: Endgame extends the TV series continuity while ignoring the sequel films, taking place in an alternate timeline.

== Animated series ==
Connor MacLeod as depicted in the animated series.

Highlander: The Animated Series aired from 1994 to 1996, presenting a new continuity and taking place on 27th century Earth, roughly 700 years after the planet suffers apocalyptic devastation from a meteorite impact. After the devastation causes much of human society to fall, all of Earth's immortals decide to stop the Game so they can preserve knowledge, uncover lost history, and guide humanity rather than kill each other. Those who agree cast away their swords and call themselves Jettators (from the French jette, "thrown away"). The only immortal who decides not to give up killing and conquest is Kortan, who is ruler over much of Earth by the 27th century. He is opposed by young immortal Quentin MacLeod (Miklos Perlos), the last of Clan MacLeod, and the boy's mentor Don Vincente Marino Ramírez (who resembles Sean Connery but is a different character altogether). Quentin has discovered a way to absorb the Quickening of other immortals without killing them, gaining their power and making them mortal in the process. He hopes one day to defeat Kortan.

In the fifth episode of the animated series, entitled "The Sound of Madness", a flashback reveals that Connor MacLeod and Don Vincente Marino Ramírez were friends in the 20th century and both became Jettators soon after the meteorite fell. When Kortan says he desires conquest and will not take the vow of non-violence, Connor (wearing his trench coat from the original movie) duels the villain, but loses. Realizing he will die in a moment, Connor prophesies that Kortan will be defeated by an immortal of the Clan MacLeod. Connor MacLeod is never seen in the series again.

== Books and comics ==
Connor appears in the TV-series tie-in novel Highlander: The Element of Fire by Jason Henderson, published in 1995. Along with exploring the friendship between the two Highlanders and Duncan's training period, the book introduces an immortal pirate Khordas who haunts them both.

Connor MacLeod is the lead character of Highlander comic books published by Dynamite Comics. Like the live-action TV series, the Dynamite Comics continuity treats the first film as canon but depicts the battle with Kurgan as not being the final battle for the Prize. Unlike the TV series, the comics also reference characters from Highlander III: The Sorcerer (also as Highlander: The Final Dimension).

The 13-issue Highlander comic series published from 2006 to 2007 follows Connor on an adventure he experiences after the events of the first movie. Connor is the star of two mini-series that each act as a prequels to the original film: Highlander: Way of the Sword and Highlander: The American Dream. He appears in the mini-series Highlander Origins: The Kurgan. The comics met with a mixed reception.

== Legacy ==
Star Fox programmer Dylan Cuthbert gave Fox McCloud the family name based upon MacLeod though he modified the spelling for it to sound more "spacey".
