= Highlander: The Source =

- Poster
- Directed by: Brett Leonard
- Screenplay by: Joel Soisson (credited as Mark Bradley); Steven Kelvin Watkins
- Story by: Joel Soisson (credited as Mark Bradley)
- Based on: Characters by Gregory Widen
- Produced by: Adrian Paul; Peter S. Davis; William N. Panzer
- Starring: Adrian Paul; Peter Wingfield; Jim Byrnes; Thekla Reuten
- Cinematography: Steve Arnold; Dmitrij Gribanov
- Edited by: Les Healey
- Music by: George Kallis
- Distributed by: Lionsgate
- Release date: September 13, 2007
- Running time: 99 minutes
- Country: United States
- Language: English
- Budget: $13 million
- Box office: $213,205

Highlander: The Source (released in some countries as Highlander 5: The Source) is a 2007 American science fantasy action adventure film directed by Brett Leonard. It is the fifth installment in the Highlander film series. The film and its prior installment, Endgame (2000), follow the continuity of Highlander: The Series (1992–1998), continuing the story of immortal swordsman Duncan MacLeod, with actor Adrian Paul reprising his role from the series and Endgame. It is the only Highlander film not to feature the original protagonist, Connor MacLeod. Taking place in a future version of Earth that is largely violent and chaotic, the story depicts Duncan and allies seeking out an energy well that may be the "Source of Immortality".

The Source is the only Highlander film not theatrically released in North America. Instead, it was broadcast on the Sci-Fi Channel on September 15, 2007. The film received overwhelmingly negative reviews from critics and fans alike, with some even equating this film to The Quickening in terms of bad reception. Originally intended as the first of a planned trilogy of Sci-Fi Channel original movies, no further sequels have been planned as a result of its negative response. At the 2009 Highlander Worldwide Convention, TV series producer David Abramowitz referred to The Source as a "bad dream" Duncan had. The film is dedicated to the memory of William N. Panzer, who died in 2007, and was the co-owner of the Davis-Panzer Inc., which was the company who created the franchise.

== Plot ==
In a possible future, parts of human society have fallen to violence and chaos, with many now living as homeless scavengers and gangs fighting over territory. A group of immortals still has resources and access to advanced technology. It includes the ancient Methos, computer hacker Reggie, warrior Zai Jie, and Cardinal Giovanni, who represents the Vatican. The group seeks to locate the "Source of Immortality". Zai Jie seems to find a lead on its location. While contacting the group, however, he is killed by the Guardian of the Source, a monstrous immortal with unnatural speed. Convinced that they need help, Methos asks his old friend Joe Dawson to find Duncan MacLeod.

Duncan separated from Anna Teshemka, his mortal wife who decided that she could not remain with him because of his infertility. While wandering the wastelands, MacLeod is attacked by the Guardian and fights back before Joe Dawson recruits him. They rendezvous with Methos's group at a monastery to meet with the Elder, an ancient being that can help locate the Source. At the monastery, they find Anna, who has been having visions related to the Source.

A group of immortals once found the Source in ancient times. Upon slaying the Guardian, two of the three survivors were cursed, with one of them becoming the new Guardian while another became the endlessly decaying Elder (the third is later implied to have been reincarnated as Anna). Anna's visions mean that she knows the way. The Elder warns that the closer they get to the Source, the weaker they will become and lose their immortality.

The Guardian arrives and attacks Reggie and Dawson on holy ground. To save Dawson, Duncan throws his katana at the Guardian, temporarily wounding him. Unaffected, the Guardian breaks the sword and kills Joe before escaping. Duncan then buries Joe and leaves with the others to find the Source, which seems to be on an island ruled by gangs of cannibals off the coast of Lithuania in the Baltic Sea.

After fighting locals, Duncan finds two butterfly daggers and decides to use them as his new weapons. The group then drives to a deserted house close to where they believe the Source to be. That night, the Guardian starts slashing Reggie. Due to their proximity to the Source, his wounds do not heal, and he dies. After burying Reggie, the group continues. During the journey, Duncan and Methos conclude that the expression "there can be only one" does not refer to one person becoming the last immortal and claiming the Prize, the power of all immortals who ever lived. It actually refers to the fact that only one immortal can claim the Source's full power.

At a roadblock, the group is captured by cannibals. While the cannibals celebrate, the Guardian frees Anna and forces her to accompany him to the Source. Giovanni then escapes. Believing it is his destiny to be "the One", he leaves Methos and Duncan to die. Duncan then frees himself and Methos. Methos concludes that Duncan is "the One" due to his incorruptible nature. He rides off on a horse to distract the cannibals, allowing Duncan to chase after Anna. Meanwhile, Giovanni is killed by the Guardian.

Duncan finds Anna in a clearing. The Guardian appears and challenges him. Now yards away from the Source, MacLeod matches the speed and strength of the Guardian. Anna seems to commune with the Source. When Duncan tries to join her, an energy barrier blocks him. The fight continues and MacLeod uses superhuman speed to bury the Guardian in the ground up to his neck. Now immobilized and defeated, the Guardian demands death. MacLeod refuses and so the curse does not transfer to him. The Guardian vanishes in a blast of light, screaming that he is now "cursed forever". Having proved his purity of heart, Duncan joins Anna and connects to the Source. As they stand together, the story ends with the image of a fetus.

=== Alternative ending ===
In the DVD release of the film, dialogue is added which reveals that the couple will indeed have a son, and Duncan declares: "He is the One".

== Cast ==
- Adrian Paul as Duncan MacLeod
- Peter Wingfield as Methos
- Jim Byrnes as Joe Dawson
- Thekla Reuten as Anna Teshemka
- Cristian Solimeno as The Guardian
- Thom Fell as Cardinal Giovanni
- Stephen Rahman Hughes as Zai Jie
- Stephen Wight as Reggie Weller
- Solly Assa as Monk

== Production ==
As early as 2001, producers of the previous film, Highlander: Endgame, were discussing plans for a fifth film with fans at conventions. However, the production of the film was plagued with several problems. The original rights holders, Miramax Films, decided to sell the rights back to the producers due to the lackluster performance of Endgame. Also, Adrian Paul refused to reprise his role as Duncan Macleod, as he was disappointed with the previous film. At this point, the producers decided to ask Christopher Lambert to reprise his role as Connor Macleod (despite the character having been killed off), but Lambert demanded more money. The producers were left with no choice but to renegotiate with Paul again, even offering him a producer's credit as well. In July 2005, Lionsgate Films acquired the rights to the film under the title Highlander: The Journey Continues, with director Brett Leonard at the helm as director, and actor Adrian Paul in the lead role as Duncan MacLeod. Leonard said: "Highlander is an amazing ongoing story that I can bring my visual style to. Everything I have done has led me to this kind of mythical fantasy." Filming began in October 2005, and concluded the following December. In June 2006, Adrian Paul revealed that Highlander: The Source had been undergoing editing and visual effects work. The actor said that composer George Kallis had been brought on board to create a film score that was recorded by an 80-piece orchestra. Production was originally intended to be filming in Africa before it was decided to film in Europe.

== Release ==
=== US release ===
Lionsgate had originally planned to release the film in 2006. When that plan failed to work out, several release dates were listed in various places; for example, February 2007 was listed in some official The Source auctions, as well as on actress Thekla Reuten's own website, and March 2007 was listed on composer George Kallis' website. Eventually, even the official auctions began using simply a broad "First Quarter 2007" release date. As of February 14, 2007, producers Peter Davis and William Panzer of Davis/Panzer Productions, in conjunction with Lionsgate Entertainment, were editing and remixing the film.

Lionsgate finally released the film as a direct-to-TV movie, which premiered on the Sci-Fi Channel on September 15, 2007. Screenwriter Joel Soisson ultimately won a Writers Guild of America screenplay-credit arbitration, and was listed in the final U.S. release's end credits under the pseudonym of "Mark Bradley". Plans to continue the films with The Source being the first of a trilogy have since been abandoned.

In 2008, a short film called Reunion was released in the DVD collection of Highlander: The Series. The film, written by series producer David Abramowitz and directed by Don Paonessa, starred actors from the show reprising their roles. The story did not acknowledge the events of Highlander: The Source and seemed to contradict it in some ways, taking place around 2008, roughly ten years after the end of the TV series. At the Highlander Worldwide Convention the next year, TV series producer David Abramowitz referred to Highlander: The Source as a "bad dream" Duncan had, leading many fans to dismiss it from canon.

Despite previous announcements and long-standing rumors that a "Producer's Cut" of the film would be released straight-to-DVD and/or theaters in September 2007, the U.S. Sci-Fi Channel aired the film at 9:00 PM and 1:00 AM Eastern, on Saturday, September 15, 2007 as a "Sci-Fi Original Movie".

=== Russian release ===
An early version of Highlander: The Source, which had been shown to distributors in October 2006, was released on DVD in February 2007 in Russia, and was quickly copied and distributed online. These copies of the release began to proliferate across the Internet. The same cut was later released in Brazil, Poland, Romania and Germany. After this release, producer Peter Davis stated that the Russian version was not the final producer's version, and that Lionsgate would release the finished film in September 2007. This was the TV premiere, eight minutes shorter than the Russian version, and featuring different opening and closing narration.

== Reception ==
Critical reaction to Highlander: The Source was universally negative. Christopher Monfette of IGN gave The Source a score of 1 out of 10, saying: "The worthwhile days of Connor MacLeod, it would appear, are officially over—dead, decapitated, and depleted of their power. The struggle for an immortal to move through life unchallenged has since mutated into an awkward arrangement of mismatched mythologies, TV-to-movie crossovers, and a steady stream of low-budget, direct-to-DVD cash-cows which may, in the end, prove to be the only truly immortal thing about this series."

Brian Orndorf of DVD Talk gave the film one half star out of five, saying: "The Source is nothing less than a parody of what has come before. If you've seen the previous sequels, you already know that's saying something. There is some relief that this franchise will finally be put out of its misery, because nobody in their right mind would try to keep this series going after watching just how boneheaded Highlander: The Source is." Danél Griffin of Film as Art gave The Source one half star out of four, remarking that "it's bad—cheesily bad, colossally bad, monumentally bad, bad enough to make you never want to watch another movie again bad."

Keith Breese of FilmCritic.com gave the film one star out of five, saying: "Not only will Highlander fans be disappointed by the film's nosedive into nonsense, but the average viewer will be stunned by the backyard quality of this film. The acting is uniformly terrible, the special effects are hideous, the sets are cheap and grubby, and the direction is uninspired. The film is an utter failure. ... Surely this is the final nail in the coffin lid for this film series. If it isn't, then something is truly wrong with the universe."

The Sci-Fi Movie Page gave The Source one and a half stars out of five, saying: "Just when you think that this is a franchise that can't sink any lower, along comes Highlander: The Source. ... One gets the impression that The Source was filmed with theatrical distribution in mind but that no sane cinema distributor would touch it with a ten-foot barge pole. Good for them. Instead it went straight to the SciFi Channel and now the DVD shelves where you should let it stay, collecting dust."
