= Highlander III: The Sorcerer =

1994 film by Andy Morahan

- Theatrical release poster
- Directed by: Andy Morahan
- Screenplay by: Paul Ohl
- Story by: William N. Panzer; Brad Mirman
- Based on: Characters by Gregory Widen
- Produced by: Claude Léger
- Starring: Christopher Lambert; Mario Van Peebles; Deborah Unger; Mako
- Cinematography: Steven Chivers
- Edited by: Yves Langlois
- Music by: J. Peter Robinson
- Production companies: Highlander Productions Limited; Fallingcloud; Initial Groupe; Lumière Pictures; Transfilm
- Distributed by: Entertainment Film Distributors (United Kingdom); Les Films Séville (Canada); AFMD (France); Alliance Atlantis (Canada)
- Release dates: November 30, 1994 (Philippines); December 9, 1994 (United Kingdom); January 27, 1995 (United States)
- Running time: 95 minutes
- Countries: United Kingdom; Canada; France
- Language: English
- Budget: $26–34 million
- Box office: $36.7 million

Highlander III: The Sorcerer (also known as Highlander: The Final Dimension or Highlander: The Final Conflict) is a 1994 action-adventure fantasy film and the third installment in the Highlander film series. Set as an alternate sequel to the original film (i.e., it completely ignores and frequently contradicts the events of Highlander II: The Quickening), it is the final Highlander film to focus on Connor MacLeod as the protagonist. In the film, Connor MacLeod is forced to face a new, dangerous enemy, a powerful sorcerer known as Kane who threatens to win the fabled "Prize" in order to gain world domination by eliminating MacLeod. It grossed $36.7 million worldwide, becoming the highest grossing film in the franchise, as well as the only one to recover its budget at the box office. It received mostly negative reviews from critics, although it was considered better than the previous film.

== Plot ==
Some time after the death of his wife Heather in the 16th century, the immortal Scottish Highlander Connor MacLeod travels to Japan to train with an immortal named Nakano, a sorcerer (said to be a master of illusion) and old friend of the Highlander's late teacher Juan Sánchez-Villalobos Ramírez. In a cave in Mount Niri, Nakano teaches MacLeod how to fight with the katana that once belonged to Ramírez. He also warns of Kane, an evil immortal making his way across Asia with two immortal henchmen named Khabul Khan and Senghi Khan. After burning down a village, the three reach the cave. Kane beheads Nakano, taking his immortal Quickening energy and power of illusion. The Highlander escapes and Nakano laughs as he dies, declaring that Kane will not be present at the time of the Gathering (when the last immortals fight) and implying he has planned one last trick. The release of his energy causes a cave in, trapping Kane and his henchmen.

In 1788 France, Connor meets and falls in love with Sarah Barrington, a visitor from England. During the French Revolution, MacLeod is captured and sentenced to death for treason against King Louis XVI. His immortal friend Pierre Bouchet takes his place, claiming he is tired of his immortal life. Believing Connor is dead, Sarah marries another man. By the time MacLeod finds her, he discovers she now has a family and decides to let her continue believing he is dead.

In 1985, the Gathering occurs in New York City and MacLeod is seemingly the last immortal left alive. He and his new love Brenda Wyatt move to Scotland and are married. She is killed in a car accident in 1987 and he survives without any wounds, indicating he has not lost his immortality and may not have won the Prize. By 1994, Connor is living with his adopted son John in Marrakesh. Meanwhile, archaeologist Dr. Alexandra Johnson (a woman identical to Sarah Barrington) is part of a team excavating the legendary cave of Nakano. The excavation frees Kane, who beheads Khabul to gain a boost in power while his other soldier Senghi leaves to find Connor.

Sensing the release of the Quickening again, MacLeod realizes the Game is not over and that he must return to New York City. MacLeod leaves John in the care of his friend, Jack Donovan. Arriving in New York, MacLeod (using his old alias of "Russell Nash" again) faces and kills Senghi. NYPD Lt. John Stenn believes Khabul's headless body is proof that the "headhunter" killer of 1985 is loose again. He concludes the killer is Russell Nash, who was a suspect during the original case.

Alex investigates a piece of kilt cloth found in the cave of Nakano, identifying it as a branch of the MacLeod family, one where a clan member was banished for having unnatural powers. Learning that Russell Nash claims to be a descendant of this branch of the clan, Alex tracks him down and witnesses him battle Kane. The fight ends when MacLeod's blade shatters (possibly because their fight crossed into holy ground) and Kane flees.

Connor returns to the Scottish Highlands to forge another sword but is unsuccessful. Learning more and concluding that "Nash" is actually the banished Connor MacLeod, still alive, Alex tracks him down and gives him a bar of finely refined steel she found in Nakano's cave. Connor forges a new katana and admits his identity, and the two become lovers. MacLeod then learns Kane has abducted his son John.

MacLeod meets Kane in an old church mission in Jersey City and follows him into an abandoned power plant for their final battle. After a brief battle, the Highlander decapitates Kane and truly wins the Prize, now possessing the full power of all immortals who ever lived. He returns to Scotland with Alex and John to live out the rest of his natural life.

== Cast ==
- Christopher Lambert as Connor MacLeod / Russell Nash
- Mario Van Peebles as Kane
- Deborah Kara Unger as Dr. Alexandra "Alex" Johnson; Sarah Barrington
- Mako as Nakano
- Martin Neufeld as Lt. John Stenn
- Raoul Trujillo as Senghi Khan
- Jean-Pierre Perusse as Khabul Khan
- Daniel Do as Dr. Fuji Takamura
- Jack Ellerton as Staring Drinker
- Gabriel Kakon as John MacLeod
- Louis Bertignac as Pierre Bouchet
- Michael Jayston as Jack Donovan
- Clancy Brown (archive footage cameo from original film) as The Kurgan

== Production ==
Director Russell Mulcahy who directed prior installments Highlander and Highlander II: The Quickening was initially slated to return as director, but withdrew when the producers did not commit his $1.2 million pay into escrow. Davis-Panzer Productions responded by initiating a lawsuit against Mulcahy seeking $8.3 million in compensatory damages for reneging on an oral agreement with the producers. The film marked the directorial debut of Andy Morahan, a music video director. Mario Van Peebles was cast opposite Christopher Lambert in the film after the two had enjoyed working together on Gunmen.

The film completely ignores and contradicts the events of Highlander II: The Quickening. The movie specifically states that Brenda Wyatt died in a car crash in 1987 and shows a version of 1994 where Earth's ozone layer is intact, whereas Highlander II depicts the ozone layer as being largely gone by 1994, causing many deaths by cancer and radiation poisoning, including Brenda's.

In a 1996 Cinefantastique interview, Highlander producer William Panzer mentioned that several references to the TV series' continuity were inserted into this film as a means of linking it to the TV universe.

Many of the locations in Scotland from the original film were revisited for this sequel. Several scenes were shot in the province of Quebec in Canada: the medieval Japanese village and the building in which Nakano's cave is found were shot near Montreal. Many sequences in New York were actually shot in Montreal, as well. Other scenes for this film were shot in Morocco.

The U.S. theatrical release was rated PG-13, and a slightly-longer R-rated Special Director's Cut was later released on home video with two sex scenes trimmed from the theatrical release restored. On top of this, additional violence was reinstated, mainly the shot of Kane's head rolling off. The PG-13 theatrical cut originally only showed Kane's head wobbling from side to side, then cutting immediately to the extreme close-up on Connor saying, "There can be only one."

Several enhanced visual effects shots are present in the American version, including Kane's arrival in New York City (via a teleportation portal, instead of stepping off of a freighter in the international version), as well as during the final Quickening sequence (where several additional shots of Connor levitating are seen, complete with new VFX work). The American Final Dimension cut includes alternate musical tracks and cues (including the song "God Took a Picture" during the ending credits instead of Loreena McKennitt's "Bonny Portmore," and a rock-instrumental version of Mötley Crüe's "Dr. Feelgood" during the final battle between MacLeod and Kane).

== Music ==
The score was composed and conducted by J. Peter Robinson. The film marks the first use of "Bonny Portmore" in the Highlander films (it was also used in the television series). The soundtrack features the following songs:

- "Ce He Mise le Ulaingt? The Two Trees" by Loreena McKennitt available on her album The Mask and Mirror
- "Bonny Portmore" by Loreena McKennitt, available on her album The Visit
- "God Took A Picture" by Suze DeMarchi (with Nuno Bettencourt)
- "Bluebeard" by Cocteau Twins
- "Dr. Feelgood" by Mötley Crüe (instrumental riff)
- "Dummy Crusher" by Kerbdog
- "Little Muscle" by Catherine Wheel
- "Boom Boom" by Definition Of Sound
- "Honest Joe" by James

== Release ==
The film was theatrically released on January 27, 1995. A home video release followed on May 16, 1995.

== Reception ==
=== Box office ===
The film opened at number one at the U.K. box office but with a disappointing gross of £864,000 ($1.3 million) in its opening week. The film debuted at number 2 at the U.S. box office, grossing $5.6 million. The following week it dropped to 7th place, taking in $2.9 million. Highlander III: The Sorcerer finished its U.S. theatrical run with a gross of $13.7 million and grossed $23 million internationally for a worldwide gross of $36.7 million. While not a success, it is the highest-grossing film of the entire franchise, as well as the only one to recoup its budget at the box office.

=== Critical response ===
Stephen Holden of The New York Times remarked, "How could an action-adventure film that cost $34 million, most of which clearly went into pyrotechnics, computerized special effects and scenic locations, end up looking cheap, silly and lifeless? [Highlander III: The Sorcerer is] an incoherent mess [and] has performances that are one-dimensional even by the undemanding standards of the genre."

The BBC's review gave the film a score of two stars out of five, saying: "This is a far superior film to Highlander II [but] it is really a copy of the first one. ... It really feels as if the Highlander story has no more to give us—but that would be very wrong. Perhaps the best thing this third movie did was promote the generally better TV series."

Christopher Null of FilmCritic.com also gave Highlander III two stars out of five, saying: "The third in a line of increasingly perplexing Highlander movies, Highlander: The Final Dimension steals wholesale the plot from the original, just throwing in some fresh faces. ... Ultra-fans will rejoice in the face of the third installment—and it's nowhere near as bad as Highlander II—but most of you can give it a pass."

In retrospective, the film holds a 0% approval rating on Rotten Tomatoes, based on 17 reviews, the critic consensus says "Borderline unwatchable and unspeakably dull, Highlander III is a sloppy third installment that still somehow manages to mark a slight improvement over its predecessor." On Metacritic the film has a score of 28% based on reviews from 12 critics, indicating "generally unfavorable reviews".
