= Duncan MacLeod =

Fictional character from the Highlander multiverse

- Highlander character
- First appearance: "The Gathering"
- Portrayed by: Adrian Paul (Original); Jeremy Beck (Young)

In-universe information
- Born: 1592
- Immortality: 1622
- Teacher: Connor MacLeod; Hamza el Kahir; Graham Ashe; Pierre Segur; Hideo Koto; May-Ling Shen; Otavio Consone

Duncan MacLeod is a fictional character and the protagonist of Highlander: The Series, which ran for six seasons from 1992 to 1998. The character also starred in two spin-off films, Highlander: Endgame and Highlander: The Source.

Portrayed by British actor Adrian Paul, Duncan is born in the Scottish Highlands in 1592, a member of the Clan MacLeod, and later discovers he is an immortal, a person born with the power of the Quickening. This means he is unable to die unless he is beheaded, and he can absorb the power and knowledge of other immortals he beheads. Duncan sometimes encounters immortals who aim to gather power by hunting each other in a game where the winner will gain "the Prize", which is the collective power and knowledge of all immortals who ever lived (leading the to series' tagline: "in the end, there can be only one."). Trained in combat, survival, and sword-fighting by his elder cousin Connor (the original hero of the Highlander movie franchise) and others, Duncan travels the world in search of friendship and adventure, helping people when he can, sometimes fighting alongside or against other immortals.

The series follows Duncan's adventures in the present day, while regular flashbacks reveal earlier adventures across the centuries. At the start of the series, he lives in the fictional city of Seacouver, Washington, but at other times he lives on a barge in Paris, France. This is because production regularly switched filming between Paris and Vancouver, British Columbia. The sixth and final season was filmed entirely in Paris.

Originally, Highlander: The Series was meant to follow directly from the events of the original 1986 film Highlander, which ended with Connor MacLeod becoming the last immortal in 1985. Rather than ignore the original story entirely, the series is set in a new timeline where the events of the film occurred, but Connor's final battle did not earn him The Prize because many immortals were still alive on Earth. Film actor Christopher Lambert declined to reprise Connor for the series so it was decided Adrian Paul would play Duncan, a kinsman of Connor who was born decades after Connor realized his own immortality.

== Character biography ==
=== TV series background ===
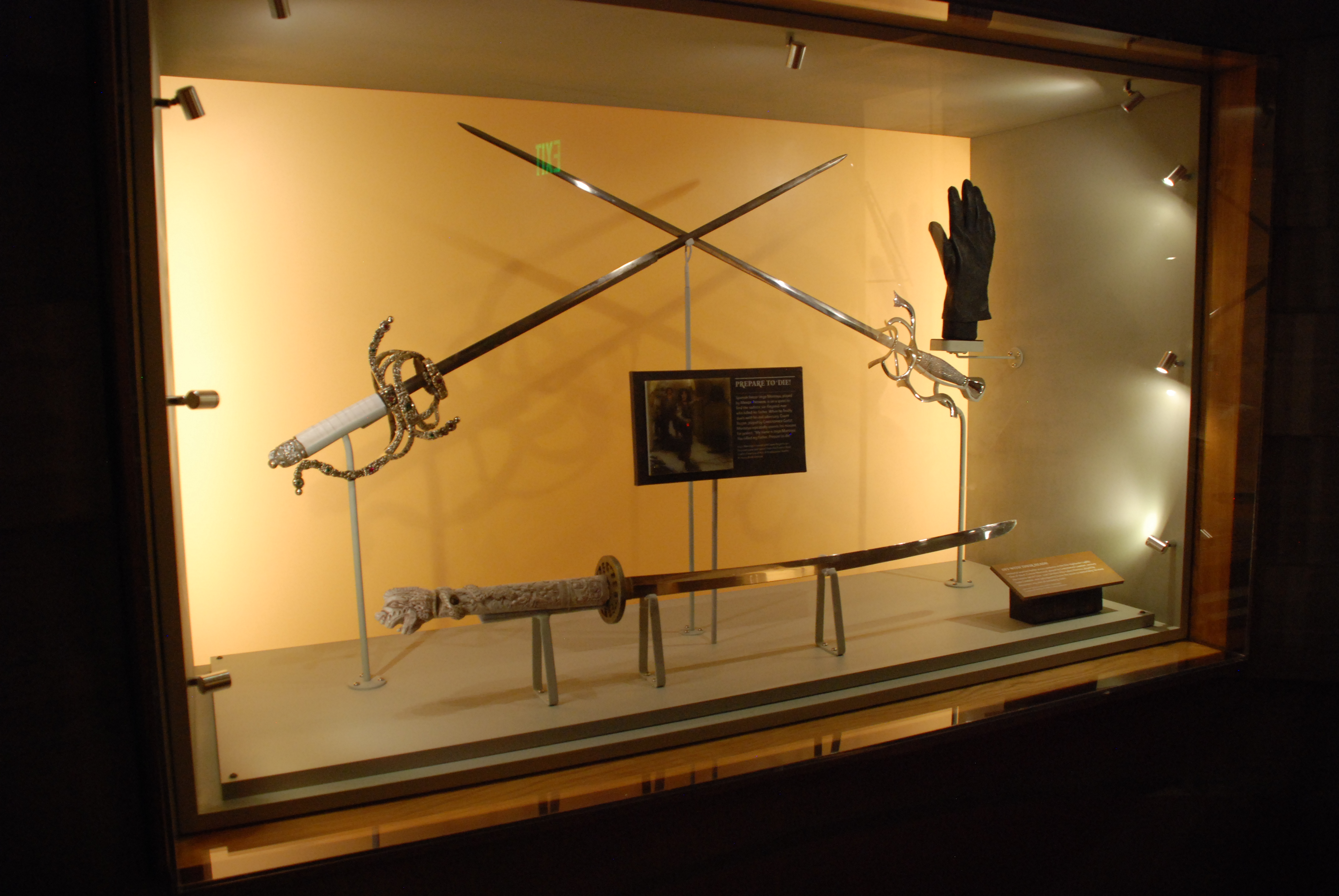
Top Props from The Princess Bride movie Inigo Montoya 's sword (left) crossed with the sword used by Westley (right) in the duel at the Cliffs of Madness; beside it, Count Rugen's six-fingered glove.At bottom is the prop sword used in Highlander series

Duncan MacLeod was born in 1592 in Glenfinnan, Scotland. Raised as the son of the clan chieftain, he would later learn that he was adopted to replace a baby who was stillborn. He never learns the identity of his biological parents, but the woman who raised him declares he is her son as far as she is concerned. As a child, Duncan hears stories about Connor MacLeod, a man who had died in battle in 1536 only to revive later, fully healed, which led the clan to banish him for witchcraft. Young Duncan believes this story is a myth. At thirteen years old, Duncan encounters Cassandra, "the Witch of Donal Woods." Cassandra, secretly an immortal, prophesies that Duncan will be a great warrior against evil and possibly destroy an enemy of hers.

In 1622, the adult Duncan is fatally wounded in battle against the Clan Campbell. When his wounds heal and he awakens, he believes it is a miracle but his father disowns him, believing it is witchcraft. Duncan is banished and forced to live in exile. He unknowingly fights another immortal and again recovers from fatal wounds. Connor finally finds Duncan in 1625, having heard stories that another member of the Clan MacLeod was exiled for unnatural powers. Connor befriends Duncan and teaches him his true nature, explaining there are rare people born with a power that, along with making them unable to produce children, activates if they suffer the shock of violent death. After their first death, they become ageless and invincible unless beheaded (though the head is more vulnerable to injury and limbs cannot be regrown). Connor explains that other immortals can take Duncan's Quickening if they kill him, absorbing his knowledge and power. The Game says that "in the end, there can be only one" and has only a few rules, such as no conflict on holy ground and only one-on-one duels. Connor spends years with Duncan, training him how to survive, and the two come to regard each other as brothers.

Preferring friendship, art, and the exchange of knowledge to violence and killing, Duncan travels the world and becomes an ally of other immortals if they don't challenge him. Close immortal friends include Hugh "Fitz" Fitzcairn and the thief Amanda. Duncan has an on-again, off-again relationship with Amanda. He also joins fights and wars when he believes he follows a just cause, leading him to become an experienced warrior. Originally taking pride in being reckless and a little uneducated, he matures into a worldly person, becoming knowledgeable in many fields and martial arts, and learning many languages. He comes to appreciate the practices and wisdom of other cultures.

In the Middle East, Duncan trains with an Arabian immortal named Hamza el Kahir. In Europe, he trains with an immortal named Tjanefer (calling himself "Graham Ashe"), who had taught Connor's own mentor Juan Sánchez-Villalobos Ramírez, and then another named Pierre Segur. All three of these friendships are cut short when each teacher is challenged and killed by other immortals. In 1778, Duncan befriends and trains under the samurai Hideo Koto in Japan. When Koto sacrifices himself for MacLeod, the Highlander inherits his katana and swears to protect the man's family for as long as he lives. After leaving Japan, Duncan meets May-Ling Shen, a Chinese immortal warrior, and former courtesan, in 1780. Surprised that the warrior "Master Shen" is a woman, Duncan becomes her student in martial arts. Briefly, they are lovers before parting as friends. Duncan later becomes involved in the Napoleonic Wars, during which he befriends the immortal priest Darius. As the war draws to a close, Duncan decides to relocate to America, hoping to find a more peaceful life in the "New World."

In America, Duncan lives with the Sioux people, taking a lover named Little Deer and helping raise her child Kahani, whom he loves as his own. When the tribe is later murdered by white colonials and a bigoted immortal named Kern, Duncan temporarily leaves society and the Game by living in isolation on holy ground. By 1847, Duncan leaves and returns to Europe for a time. In 1851, he learns new sword fighting techniques from Otavio Corsone, a former student of Ramírez. Their friendship ends when Duncan realizes the noble-born sees the Scottish Highlander as a barbarian beneath his class. Years later, Duncan joins the American Civil War, becoming a scout for the Union Army and a conductor in the Underground Railroad. He also spends some time in a Confederate prison camp. After the war, he travels between the U.S. and Europe, having different adventures and professions. During World War I, he works as an army medic in Europe. During World War II, he is in London for a time before joining the French Resistance. Afterward, he aids Jewish refugees before returning to North America.

=== TV series modern day adventures ===
In 1980, Duncan meets and falls in love with French artist and sculptor Tessa Noël. After three years, he explains his true nature to her, though he does not explain that immortals battle each other for power in the Game. To his relief, she decides to remain at his side. Over the next several years, he occasionally battles other immortals but does not tell Tessa, not wishing to worry her. By 1992, they move to Seacouver and open a shop called MacLeod and Noël Antiques. One night, while a thief named Richie Ryan breaks into the shop, MacLeod is confronted by an evil immortal named Slan Quince. Tessa at last learns about the Game and that certain immortals are determined to win the Prize, the collected power of all immortals who ever lived. Though angry that Duncan kept this from her and now fearful that life with him will regularly involve violence, Tessa decides to remain. Witnessing Duncan's fights with Quince, Richie Ryan learns about the existence of immortals. Duncan decides to take him in, saying the 17-year-old needs guidance so he doesn't return to his criminal life. Richie is hired to work at the antique shop and becomes a younger brother of sorts to Duncan and Tessa, adding enthusiasm and comic relief to their adventures.

For a time, Duncan and Tessa relocate to Paris, living on a barge the Highlander purchases near Notre Dame. Richie joins them. MacLeod later learns that there is a group of mortals who have been secretly documenting the lives and actions of immortals for thousands of years—an organization called The Watchers. While most are benevolent and don't interfere, a sub-group called the Hunters goes rogue, hunting down immortals so that none of them who win the Prize may use that power to rule humanity. Horton, leader of the Hunters, becomes a hated enemy to Duncan. Meanwhile, Joe Dawson, a Watcher assigned to observe Duncan, attempts to forge a friendship with the Highlander and openly aids him at times. Duncan is later shocked to learn that one of Joe's Watcher colleagues is secretly the legendary immortal Methos, who is over 5000 years old and believed to be the oldest living immortal. The two form their own friendship.

After returning to Seacouver, Duncan proposes to Tessa. Immediately afterward, Tessa is kidnapped by a Hunter. Duncan frees her and then sends her home with Richie while he investigates the man's files. But outside, a mugger robs and fatally shoots Richie and Tessa. Duncan cradles Tessa's body as Richie awakens, now realizing what the Highlander had sensed since they first met: he is also immortal. Grief-stricken and feeling responsible for Tessa's death, Duncan becomes a more somber and introverted character. He has Richie sell the antique shop and then purchases a gym called DeSalvo's Martial Arts. He keeps former owner Charlie DeSalvo on as the manager and befriends him. Together, Charlie and Duncan teach Richie martial arts and sword fighting. When Richie repeatedly seems motivated by emotion rather than reason in his battles, Duncan decides he has taught the young man enough and they must follow different paths now. They resume a friendship later but repeatedly clash in regard to morality, who to trust, and how to deal with enemies.

A year after Tessa's death, MacLeod's next major relationship begins with trauma surgeon Anne Lindsey. Duncan later realizes she is being targeted by his enemies and believes it might be best that they go separate ways. Soon afterward, Anne witnesses Duncan apparently dying and he decides to keep his survival secret to protect her, leaving for Paris once more. Later, he regrets this and contacts her, revealing his true nature. Anne now has a child from a brief relationship with a friend who comforted her and Duncan prepares to help raise her child so they can be together. Anne later witnesses the cruelty of an evil immortal and realizes she hopes Duncan will kill him in a duel. She decides she cannot be in a relationship with the Highlander, arguing that a doctor is supposed to save lives and not condone killing. They break up.

Revisiting his home for the first time in centuries, Duncan meets Rachel MacLeod, a mortal descendant of the Clan MacLeod. Suspicious of Duncan at first, she later realizes he is a good person and the legendary Duncan MacLeod who seemingly returned from death. During this visit, Duncan uses his old clan broadsword to avenge the death of his father, realizing the man was killed by a Viking immortal. Duncan and Rachel become friends and share a brief relationship.

As the series progresses, Duncan loses more beloved friends, both mortal and immortal, sometimes being indirectly or directly responsible for their deaths. After suffering a Dark Quickening, in which his personality is corrupted by the evil of the person whose power he absorbed, he attacks multiple friends and kills one, only realizing afterward that he is not in control of himself. He heals from the experience but carries the guilt of his actions. When a demonic entity warps his perception with hallucinations and drives him to attack a beloved friend, he spends a year in isolation to process the trauma and his guilt.

Duncan comes to wonder if his friends would have been better off not knowing him. In the two-part series' finale episodes, "To Be" and "Not To Be," Duncan has visions of a world where he was never born and realizes the positive effect he has had on many people, even Richie and Tessa.

=== Films ===
Highlander: Endgame (2000) — While the first three theatrical films of the Highlander franchise featured Connor MacLeod, the fourth Highlander: Endgame continued the canon of Highlander: The Series, which had ended its six-year run two years earlier. The film was originally going to team-up Duncan with his sometimes love Amanda, who had become the star of her spin-off show Highlander: The Raven. However, the spin-off only lasted one season and plans changed to feature Connor and Duncan once again uniting. Highlander: Endgame establishes that Duncan has killed at least 176 immortals by the year 2000. The film got mixed reviews with many feeling negatively about it.

The film's flashbacks give further details regarding Connor training Duncan when they were younger. It also reveals that Duncan married a pre-immortal Irish woman named Kate Devaney in 1715. While Connor advises that Kate be allowed to simply age and die naturally, Duncan decides to activate her immortality by giving her a fatal stab wound. Hating her new immortality, Kate leaves and resents Duncan for condemning her to an ageless life.

The film introduces Jacob Kell, an evil immortal with a grudge against Connor who ignores the rules of the Game, overpowering other immortals with the help of henchmen. Duncan reunites with Connor and discovers that one of Kell's soldiers, the woman called Faith, is his immortal former wife Kate. Sickened by his unending life of violence and believing that neither he nor Duncan can defeat Kell alone, Connor duels Duncan and demands the younger Highlander take his head and power. Seeing Connor won't be swayed, Duncan tells Connor he loves him and considers him a brother. He then beheads Connor, absorbing his power and knowledge. When Duncan later battles Kell, he briefly speaks with Connor's face and voice.

An extended ending on the DVD release reveals that after beheading Kell, Duncan discovers that Faith is still alive. Willing to re-establish at least a friendship with Duncan, Faith once again calls herself Kate.

Highlander: The Source (2007) — Made for broadcast by the Syfy channel (then still called "the Sci-Fi Channel"), this TV-movie aired at 9 p.m. Eastern on Saturday, September 15, 2007 as a "Sci-Fi Original Movie." Continuing Duncan's adventures several years after Highlander: Endgame, the story takes place in a possible future version of Earth where human society has fallen into chaos. Duncan has married a mortal woman named Anna Teshemka but separated from her when she decided they couldn't stay together if she couldn't have a family with him. With her and other allies, he investigates an energy well in Eastern Europe that may be the legendary Source of Immortality. The closer he approaches the Source, the more mortal he becomes. During their quest, Duncan and his allies are hunted by the Guardian, an immortal with enhanced abilities. At the end of the film, Duncan defeats the Guardian but does not behead him. He and Anna then seem to merge with the Source and she reveals they will have a child. The film was met with largely negative reviews. Plans to follow it up with further TV films were canceled.

In 2008, a short film called "Reunion" was released in the DVD collection of Highlander: The Series. Written by series producer David Abramowitz and directed by Don Paonessa, the film does not acknowledge the events of Highlander: The Source. Rather, it revolved around Joe Dawson adjusting to retirement, Methos considering marriage, and Amanda reconsidering her lifestyle. Duncan was mentioned but not seen. At the Highlander Worldwide Convention the following year, TV series producer David Abramowitz referred to Highlander: The Source as a "bad dream" Duncan had, leading many fans to dismiss it from canon.

=== Books ===
A series of nine licensed novels were released from October 1995 to February 1999: The Element of Fire, Scimitar, Scotland the Brave, Measure of a Man, The Path, Zealot, Shadow of Obsession, The Captive Soul, White Silence, and An Evening at Joe's. These novels detail additional events in Duncan's life. The Element of Fire features more adventures of Duncan and Connor fighting alongside each other.

A German language novel entitled Highlander: Die Rückkehr des Unsterblichen (Highlander: The Return of the Immortal) was also released. It deals with Duncan wishing to leave the Game and takes place during the season one series episode "Deadly Medicine."

RK Books published a series called Highlander Imagine. Although technically a fan fiction series written by W.L. Jones and L. Bordini, the series is authorized by Davis-Panzer Productions and StudioCanal Films Ltd. The books depict an alternate continuity where Tessa did not die at the end of the episode "The Darkness" and explores Duncan's life afterward. The books include Highlander Imagine - For Love's Sake, Highlander Imagine - Beyond Infinity, and Highlander Imagine - Code Name: Immortal.

=== Comics ===
Duncan also appears in the Highlander comics. In the fifth issue he comforts Connor after Brenda Wyatt is injured in a car accident on New Year's Eve in 1986. In another story, collected as Highlander: Dark Quickening, Duncan helps Connor deal with the aftereffects of absorbing the Kurgan's Quickening. In another story, collected as Highlander: Armageddon, Duncan is captured by a renegade Watcher group called the Eye and forced to compete in a fight club against other immortal warriors.

=== Audio plays ===
In a series of audio plays, Adrian Paul reprises his role as Duncan MacLeod in audio plays produced by Big Finish Productions: The Lesson, Love and Hate, The Secret of the Sword, and Kurgan Rising. One story features a sexually transmitted disease deadly to immortals. In another, an immortal being killed on holy ground seems to upset reality, temporarily resurrecting both the Kurgan and Connor MacLeod.

Duncan also appears in Highlander: A Celtic Opera, an opera jointly composed by Roger Bellon and Harlan Collins. The opera follows Duncan's banishment from his clan, his relationship with a mortal woman named Aurora who becomes his wife, and his encounters with an immortal Visigoth named Fritagern. In the end, Duncan beheads Fritagern in the 21st century after the man murders a cloned Aurora on their wedding day.

== Character development ==
The TV series originally intended to feature Connor MacLeod as the protagonist, picking up seven years after the battle with his enemy the Kurgan at the end of the original Highlander movie. When film actor Christopher Lambert turned down an offer to reprise the role of Connor for the series, the producers decided to recast the role. Adrian Paul auditioned and was cast but thought Lambert's portrayal of Connor was popular with fans it would be better to create a new character rather than try to replace him. When Lambert became available for guest star in the pilot, production decided to create its own hero and it was decided that Adrian Paul would now be playing Connor's student and kinsman Duncan MacLeod. Lambert guest-starred in the show's first episode to show his approval of the new Highlander and to establish their relationship to the audience.

Like Connor, Duncan shares a love of antiques, collecting mementos from different lifetimes and cultures, and learning about the art and history of different cultures. Connor had been portrayed in the films as someone who had a good sense of humor and cared deeply for some people, but was largely introverted and tried to live quietly without drawing much attention to himself. In contrast, Duncan was made to be more of a swashbuckler, often volunteering to help friends and even sometimes strangers with their problems and protect them from others. With a strong sense of honor and a sometimes stubborn determination to protect and avenge his friends, he is sometimes called a Boy Scout or compared to a superhero by other characters. Along with this, he harshly judges those he considers corrupt or dangerous, even after years or centuries have passed, unless he sees proof that they have changed. According to Executive Producer William Panzer, "once you've hurt him, he doesn't forget. And immortals have a long time to remember, and sooner or later you will cross his path."

Duncan is more open to love than Connor and the movies reveal he has married or hoped to marry on multiple occasions. He does not take the Game as seriously as Connor and continually hopes he can simply retire from it and never have to worry that one day he may fight his friends. Duncan is often haunted by the loss of those he comes to care for. In the first episode, he remarks, "No matter how many years go by or how many times you say goodbye to those you care most about, when they leave, you... When they die, you're naked and alone."

Actor Alexandra Vandernoot who played Tessa thought "the relationship between Tessa and MacLeod was very deep because very soon, he told her about himself... because he trusted her, and I think trust is a very good definition of their relationship. She trusted him entirely and he trusted her." Reviewer Rob Lineberger said, "Together, they are a model couple. They have healthy banter, intense arguments, plenty of romance, and an easy comfort with each other." Following the death of Tessa, Duncan becomes noticeably more somber and more guarded. Further deaths throughout the series bring him increased feelings of guilt and grief. Associate Creative Consultant Gillian Horvath said, "it changed the tone of the show. It made Highlander the show where you couldn't be positive that the characters were safe because they were in the credits." Tessa's death gave the show a more pessimistic tone that influenced the remaining characters. Lineberger said, "Richie and Duncan relate to each other differently from now on, and Duncan is bereft of much of his joy [and] moodier as well. Tessa is no longer around to lighten him."

== Reception ==
TV Guide ranked Duncan MacLeod # 11 on its "25 Greatest Sci-Fi Legends" list.
