= Highlander: The Series season 1 =

Highlander: The Series
- Season 1
- DVD box set
- No. of episodes: 22

Release
- Original network: Syndication
- Original release: October 3, 1992 – May 22, 1993

Season chronology
- Next → Season 2

The first season of the international fantasy series Highlander: The Series, part of the Highlander franchise, consisted of 22 episodes produced between 1992 and 1993, and began airing on October 3, 1992 in broadcast syndication. Highlander: The Series follows the adventures of Duncan MacLeod, a 400-year-old Immortal who can only die if he is beheaded; conflict inevitably finds him because he is part of the Gathering, an ongoing battle in which all Immortals have to fight and behead each other until only one is left. The season was released on DVD as a nine-disc boxed set on November 12, 2002 by Anchor Bay Entertainment. As of October 2025, It is also available on the streaming services Prime Video and Peacock.

== Production ==
The French leading production company Gaumont Television bought the rights to the series to have it produced in syndication in America with a local crew, a ground-breaking move at the time. The rights were acquired by producer Marla Ginsburg at the 1991 Cannes Film Festival. Highlander marked the first time a French production company was creatively involved in a show intended for the American market. The show was co-produced in syndication by international partners including Gaumont, RTL Plus (Germany), Rysher Distribution (United States), Reteitalia Productions (Italy), Amuse Video (Japan) and TF1 (France). The budget of the first season was US$26.1 million. Keith Samples, president of Rysher, stated that "about 75% of the guaranteed budget came from overseas sales." The remaining 25% came from United States sales and the producers retained the distribution rights, which allowed the show to produce $800,000 per episode only from international income, believed to be the top result of the 1992-1993 season. To secure an adequate share of European content, and as a result of the co-production agreement, each season was divided into two segments, the first segment was filmed in Vancouver, British Columbia, Canada (posing at the fictional location of Seacouver, Washington, United States), the second in Paris, France. The production of the first segment began in Vancouver on 13 July 1992, while the production of the second segment started in December 1992 in Paris and used the studios of French state production agency Société Française de Production (SFP) at Bry-sur-Marne near Paris.

Steven Maier demanded $100,000 per episode. For the first season, this represented $2.2 million, almost 10% of the projected budget. Obsessed with this number, Steven seemed more flexible in the distribution of profits, and Marc du Pontavice insisted that more than half of the series' filming be done in France, with a predominantly French crew, protecting Marla. The only remaining point to discuss was a clause regarding the opening credits. Du Pontavice argued in favor of Christian Charret and Ginsburg; to his surprise, his interlocutors yielded and agreed to give them a prominent place. In exchange, they demanded a place in the end credits, superimposed on the last image.

With the agreement signed, Marla could develop the creative side of the production. To win over the United States, American networks needed guarantees for control of the filming. To reassure them, they promised to film part of the series in Vancouver, Canada. They turned to Rysher Entertainment, which specialized in the first-run syndication market. The company, controlled by Keith Sample and Tim Helfet, rarely had the opportunity to get its hands on a series with that level of budget, usually reserved for the major networks. They put up almost a quarter of the total budget. The international partners included a conditional clause in their agreement, requiring Christopher Lambert to guest star in the first few episodes, as Peter Davis and Bill Panzer had already secured their agreement a few weeks earlier. However, with less than three months to go before filming, Davis called du Pontavice informing him that Lambert had changed his mind and didn't want to participate in a television series, especially not in the role he had played in the film. Du Pontavice tried to persuade Lambert's agent, but he wouldn't listen.

Ginsburg and du Pontavice managed to convince all the partners to drop Lambert, except for RTL, which threatened not to honor its contract if Lambert wasn't part of the cast. RTL's contribution was significant, representing over $8 million, about a third of the budget. With less than two months until filming began, and with so much money already committed, turning back seemed impossible. Informing Gaumont about the situation could lead to the project's cancellation, causing significant losses and damaging the group's confidence. With Charret's support, du Pontavice decided to negotiate directly with Lambert's American agent.

As the days passed, the agent's demands increased, causing great stress for du Pontavice. Charret looked away, and Ginsburg was busy with filming preparations. Du Pontavice felt alone, receiving calls from the agent in the middle of the night. One early morning, after Lambert's definitive refusal, du Pontavice collapsed, letting the bathwater overflow and flood the apartment. He ended up waking his wife, Alix de Maistre, to whom he explained the situation in an absurd way, which made them laugh uncontrollably, relieving the tension. Du Pontavice decided to try one last approach. He called his contact at RTL and asked if a single episode with Lambert would suffice. To his relief, the answer was affirmative. Ginsburg quickly adjusted the script so that the first episode would be the passing of the baton between Connor and Duncan MacLeod. Du Pontavice negotiated with Lambert's agent, offering $2 million for seven days of filming. After a brief silence, the agent accepted the offer. With the deal in place, Ginsburg was able to move forward with the networks. During the summer and fall, they developed the creative side.

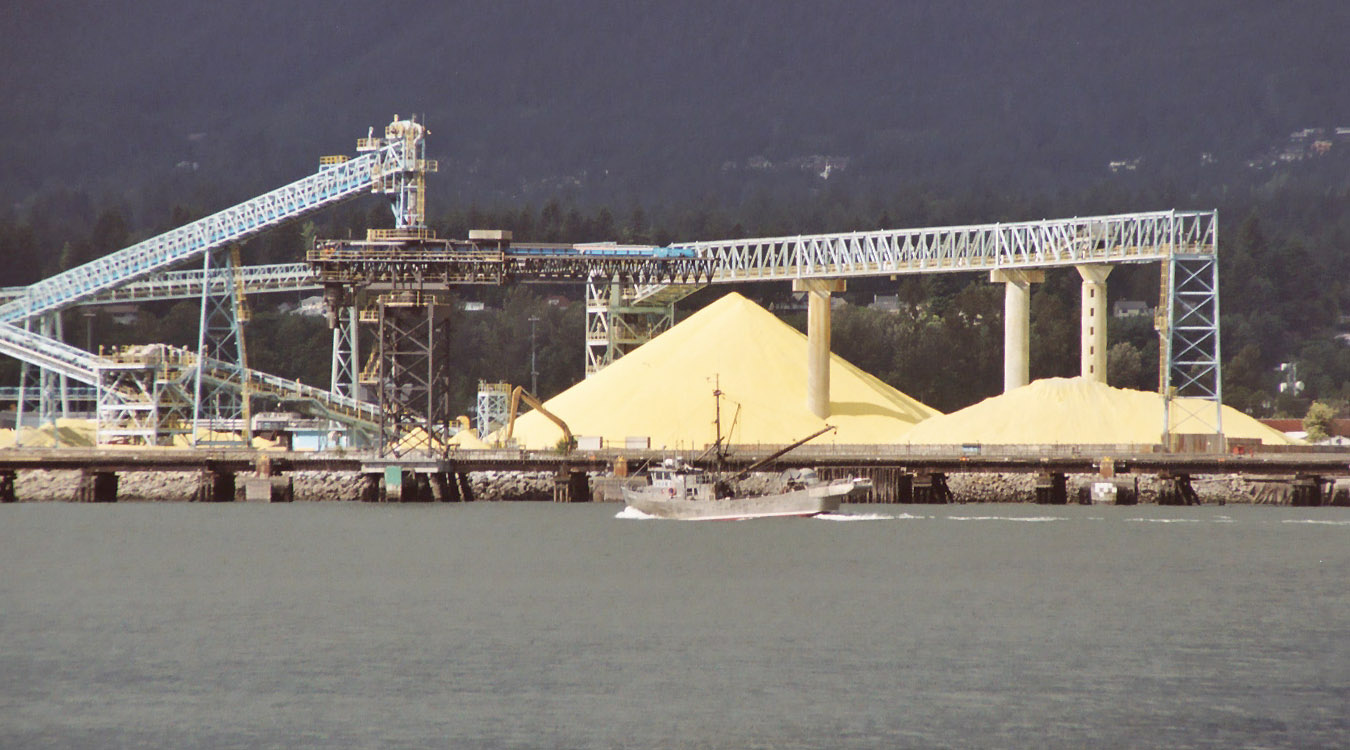
The swordfight at the end of the thirteenth episode, "Band of Brothers", was filmed at Vancouver Harbour, British Columbia, Canada

The executive producers were Bill Panzer, Peter S. Davis, Gaumont Television president Christian Charret and Gaumont co-production chief Marla Ginsburg. Steven Maier, Sheryl Hardy and Guy Collins were co-executive producers. Kevin Droney and Philip John Taylor were supervising producers at the beginning of the season; from the seventh episode onwards, David Abramowitz became supervising producer instead of Taylor. The producers were Barry Rosen and Gary Goodman. Executives in charge of production were Marc du Pontavice and Denis Leroy. Scripts were contributed by both staff and freelance writers, Brian Clemens among the latter. Brent-Carl Clackson was line producer on the Vancouver segment, from episode one to thirteen. When production moved to Paris, Clackson was succeeded by Patrick Millet (with the title of production manager) for episodes fourteen to twenty-two. The regular directors were Thomas J. Wright, Jorge Montesi and Ray Austin. The fencing coach was Bob Anderson, who coined for himself the title of Master of Swords. Anderson choreographed the fights on the Vancouver segment then was succeeded by Peter Diamond, credited as second unit director and stunt coordinator on the Paris segment. The opening theme was "Princes of the Universe" from the 1986 album A Kind of Magic by Queen; incidental music was composed by Roger Bellon.

== Cast ==
Three roles had star billing: Adrian Paul played Duncan MacLeod, Alexandra Vandernoot acted as MacLeod's French lover Tessa Noël, a mortal artist and sculptor, and Stan Kirsch portrayed young, quick-talking petty thief Richie Ryan. Amanda Wyss, who played ambitious and inquisitive journalist Randi McFarland, was only credited in the six episodes she appeared in. (Note: Wyss was also credited in the eighteenth episode, "The Lady and the Tiger", although she did not appear in it.) The first episode, "The Gathering", features a guest appearance of Christopher Lambert, reprising his role as Connor MacLeod from the Highlander movies. Several recurring characters were also introduced this season, including Werner Stocker as Immortal monk Darius, Roland Gift as hedonistic killer Xavier St. Cloud, Elizabeth Gracen as international thief Amanda, Roger Daltrey as Immortal Hugh Fitzcairn and Peter Hudson as James Horton, the leader of the Hunters, a group of mortals who believe that Immortals must be eliminated.

== Reception ==
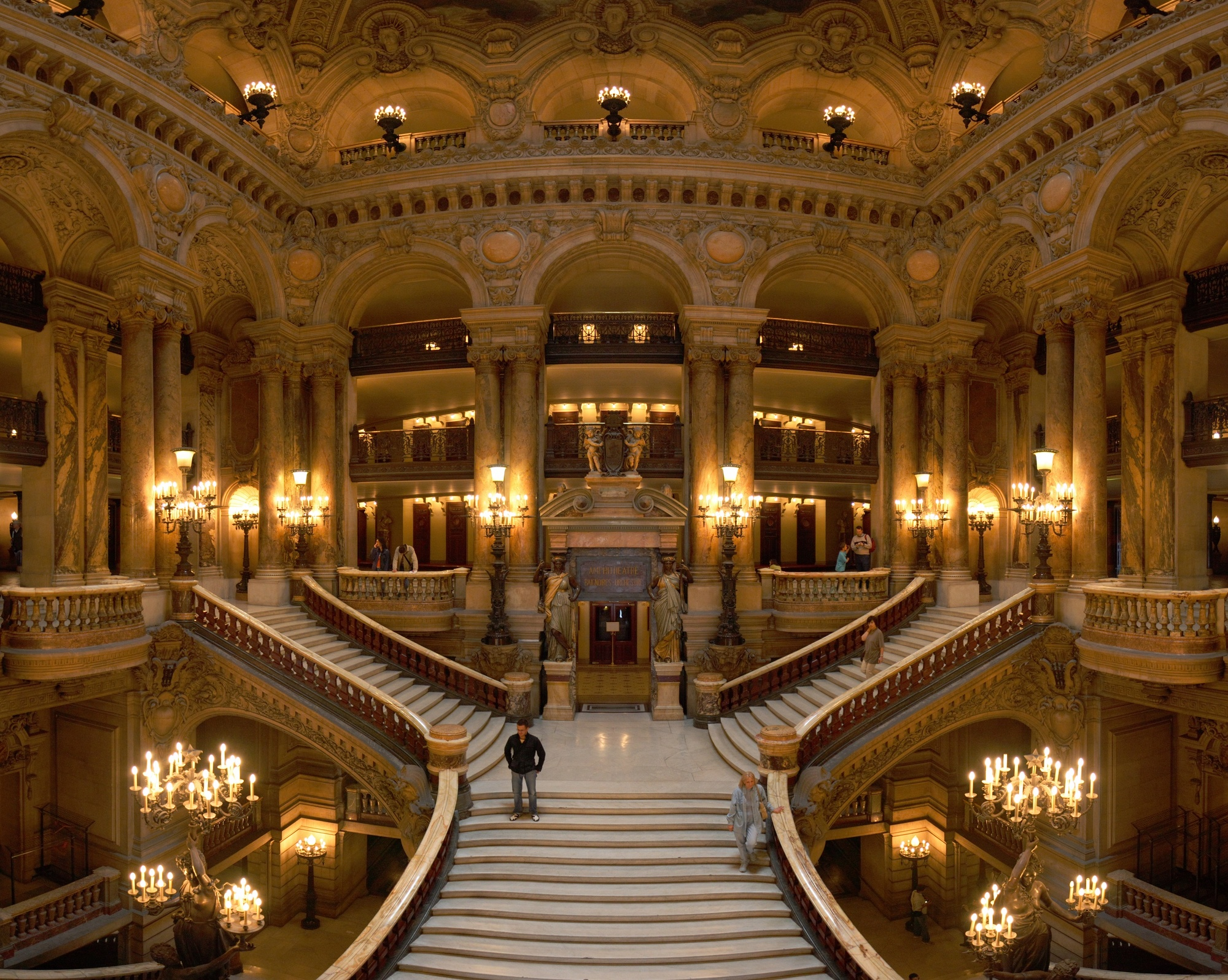
The sixteenth episode, "The Beast Below", was partially filmed at the Paris Opera

The pilot episode "The Gathering" achieved a 3.4/7 rating, meaning that 3.4 percent of viewers aged 18 to 49 as well as 7 percent of all viewers watching television at the time saw the episode. The Hollywood Reporter qualified this as a "solid performance" and Samples commented that it "more than met the company's expectations." Samples also estimated that "the first season averaged a healthy 4 rating in domestic syndication and was strong in both men and women demos 18–49," while Charret felt the first season did "quite well." Rick Sanchez of IGN wrote that season one was "all about finding the show's footing" and "was pretty squarely mired in the movies that had come before and in the formula for making a weekly action series." It has been released on DVD in Region 1 on November 12, 2002 by Anchor Bay Entertainment, and in Region 2 on December 7, 2004.

== Episodes ==
No. overall	No. in season	Title	Directed by	Written by	Original release date	Prod. code
1	1	"The Gathering"	Thomas J. Wright	Dan Gordon	October 3, 1992	92102-1
Richie Ryan breaks into Duncan MacLeod and Tessa Noel's antique store, but his robbery is interrupted by the dramatic entrance of Immortals Slan Quince (Richard Moll) and Connor MacLeod (Christopher Lambert). Witnessing them, Tessa realizes to her dismay that Duncan can be challenged and beheaded at any time. Duncan, knowing that he cannot flee the Game, expects her to leave him for her own safety. After Duncan saves Tessa from Quince, Connor fights Quince on a bridge, but is shot by a hidden weapon and knocked over the railing. Duncan beheads Quince and leaves the town. Connor advises Duncan to "watch" Richie, and tells Tessa where Duncan is. Accepting the danger, Tessa reunites with Duncan, while Connor departs to continue his war against Evil Immortals.
2	2	"Family Tree"	Jorge Montesi	Kevin Droney	October 10, 1992	92106-2
Richie, now living with Duncan and Tessa, tries to find his parents. Duncan remembers that he was banished from his village in 1622 after suffering a deadly battle wound and awakening as an Immortal; his father had told him he was an orphan. Con man Joe Scanlon (J.E. Freeman) tells Richie he is his father. Richie half believes it and develops a close relationship with Scanlon until Scanlon steals a priceless pre-Columbian mask to repay his gambling debts. After Duncan saves Scanlon and retrieves the mask, Richie helps Scanlon to disappear.
3	3	"The Road Not Taken"	Thomas J. Wright	Terry Nelson	October 17, 1992	92108-3
Richie's friend Gary dies in a bank robbery. When Duncan and Richie see his body at the hospital, they notice strange marks on Gary's forehead. Duncan remembers those marks are an after-effect of the potion made by his immortal friend Kiem Sun (Soon-Tek Oh), which gives people enormous strength and makes them ignore pain. Kiem Sun tells Duncan his potion has been stolen by his student Chou Lin (Dustin Nguyen). Duncan finds Chou Lin and fights him, but Kiem Sun interferes and kills him. Duncan destroys the potion, which makes Kiem Sun so angry that he fights Duncan. Duncan defeats him and spares him, but warns him that he will finish him if they meet again.
4	4	"Innocent Man"	Jorge Montesi	Dan Gordon	October 24, 1992	92103-4
Immortal Lucas Desiree (Victor A. Young), an old friend of Duncan, is beheaded by Sheriff Howard Crowley (John Novak), who frames homeless Vietnam war veteran Leo Atkins (Vincent Schiavelli) for the crime. When Duncan comes to town to investigate the death, he realizes Leo is innocent and, with Richie's help, saves Leo from being lynched by the townspeople. Duncan then fights and beheads Crowley.
5	5	"Free Fall"	Thomas J. Wright	Philip John Taylor	October 31, 1992	92101-5
Immortal Felicia Martins (Joan Jett) is pursued by Immortal Devereux (Eli Gabay), whose wife and baby she had killed a century ago. In the present, she seduces Richie to obtain shelter and fencing lessons from Duncan, pretending she is a young, newborn Immortal. Devereux finds Martins and she beheads him. Meanwhile, Duncan discovers that a Coronelli map Martins has faked is two hundred years old. Duncan fights Martins but spares her life due to Richie begging for it.
6	6	"Bad Day in Building A"	Jorge Montesi	Kevin Droney	November 7, 1992	92107-6
Duncan, Tessa and Richie are taken hostage in a court building by assassin Bryan Slade (Andrew Divoff). Duncan is knocked out. Slade kills Duncan to blackmail the SWAT commando outside into giving them a helicopter to flee. While Tessa does her best to keep the hostages alive and Randi McFarland reports the event live outside, Duncan revives and subdues or kills Slade's men one by one. MacLeod finally kills Slade.
7	7	"Mountain Men"	Thomas J. Wright	Marie-Chantal Droney	November 14, 1992	92110-7
While photographing old petroglyphs in the mountains, Tessa is abducted by mountain men led by Immortal Caleb Cole (Marc Singer), who wants to marry her. Duncan pursues them but must throw himself into a crevasse to escape Cole's henchmen. They bring Duncan's sword back to their camp and Cole realizes Duncan is Immortal when he sees it. Tessa instigates infighting among the kidnappers, buying Duncan time to find her. Duncan then fights and beheads Cole with his own axe.
8	8	"Deadly Medicine"	Ray Austin	Robert L. McCullough	November 21, 1992	92111-8
Duncan is hit by a car and brought to the hospital. When Dr. Wilder (Joe Pantoliano) realizes that Duncan walked out by himself, he captures him and locks him in his basement to find out why. Duncan escapes but is so confused by the drugs Wilder gave him that he cannot remember the location of Wilder's house. Wilder kidnaps Randi McFarland, who was investigating Duncan's disappearance. With Tessa's help, Duncan finds Wilder's place and saves Randi. Wilder accidentally sets fire to his basement while fighting Duncan and dies.
9	9	"The Sea Witch"	Thomas J. Wright	David Tynan	December 5, 1992	92112-9
A meeting between Richie's friend Nikki (Johannah Newmarch), her boyfriend and two drug dealers ends in a shooting and Nikki secretly keeps both the drugs and the money. Duncan foils several attempts by the dealers to retrieve the stolen goods and discovers that their leader is Immortal Alexei Voshin (Stephen Macht), who had betrayed Duncan in 1938. When Voshin discovers that Duncan has destroyed the drug and is protecting Nikki, he challenges him. Duncan fights Voshin, who is beheaded by his ship's propeller.
10	10	"Revenge is Sweet"	Ray Austin	Loraine Despres	December 12, 1992	92109-10
In 1988 (New Year's Eve to 1989), Immortal Walter Reinhardt (Christoph M. Ohrt) disappeared after losing a fight against Duncan. In the present, Reinhardt's former lover Rebecca (Vanity) recognizes Reinhardt's sword in Duncan's antique shop and begins stalking Duncan. Reinhardt, who is still alive, manipulates Rebecca in order to make her believe that Duncan has killed him, and kidnaps Richie to draw MacLeod into a fight. Duncan eventually draws Reinhardt out and beheads him.
11	11	"See No Evil"	Thomas J. Wright	Brian Clemens	December 19, 1992	92114-11
Tessa's friend Natalie (Moira Walley-Beckett) is attacked by serial killer "the Scalper" (Dee McCafferty). Duncan realizes the Scalper is imitating Immortal Marcus Korolus (J. G. Hertzler), who used to kill blonde women in 1925 until Duncan beheaded him. Duncan is the only one apart from the Scalper to know that Korolus used the Orpheum Theater as a base. Duncan sets up a trap in which Tessa acts as a bait, but the Scalper foils their plan by attacking another woman. Tessa hits him with Duncan's Thunderbird to stop him.
12	12	"Eyewitness"	Ray Austin	David Tynan	February 6, 1993	92115-12
Tessa witnesses the murder of artist Anne Wheeler (Diana Barrington) but police refuse to investigate because they found no body. Investigating the murder on their own, Tessa and Duncan are targeted by the murderer, who Duncan realizes is Immortal. Later, police discover Wheeler's body and put Tessa under protection, but a bomb is planted at the safe house and Duncan saves Tessa from the explosion. Duncan discovers that the murderer is Chief Detective Andrew Ballin (Tom Butler) fights him and beheads him.
13	13	"Band of Brothers"	René Manzor	Marie-Chantal Droney	February 13, 1993	92118-13
Immortal Grayson (James Horan) is killing the protegees of his former teacher Darius (Werner Stocker) to make him leave Holy Ground and fight him. Darius asks Duncan to protect his mortal student Victor Paulus (Earl Pastko) from Grayson, so Duncan saves Paulus' life twice and meets Grayson. Realizing Grayson will not give up, Duncan fights and beheads him. Duncan then joins Tessa and Richie in Paris and they settle on a barge near Notre Dame.
14	14	"For Evil's Sake"	Ray Austin	David Abramowitz and Fabrice Ziolkowski	February 20, 1993	92117-14
Immortal Kuyler (Peter Howitt) makes his victims laugh so that they drop their guard and he can kill them. Duncan, having seen Kuyler kill Baron Deschields in 1783, recognizes Kuyler's modus operandi when an old man is killed in a nearby café. Duncan remembers how Kuyler caught him without his sword in 1980, resulting in Duncan fleeing on a Bateau Mouche and meeting Tessa for the first time. Duncan, knowing Kuyler's taste for absinthe, tracks him down, then fights and beheads him.
15	15	"For Tomorrow We Die"	Robin Davis	Philip John Taylor	February 27, 1993	92116-15
Immortal Xavier St. Cloud (Roland Gift) robs a jewelry using poison gas then confesses it to Darius to provoke him. Darius refuses to violate the privacy of the confession for Inspector LeBrun (Hugues Leforestier) and does not tell him about Xavier. When LeBrun mentions the gas, Duncan remembers Xavier. In the meantime, Xavier lends an African sculpture to the exhibition Tessa is organizing and plants a bomb inside. During the opening party of the exhibition, Duncan realizes where the sculpture comes from, discovers the bomb and disarms it. Duncan then fights Xavier and severs his left hand, but Xavier escapes.
16	16	"The Beast Below"	Daniel Vigne	Marie-Chantal Droney	March 6, 1993	92123-16
Ursa (Christian Van Acker), a mentally deficient Immortal living under the Opera de Paris, loves singer Carolyn Lamb (Dee Dee Bridgewater); taking advantage of this, Carolyn makes Ursa kidnap backing vocalist Jenny (Fay Masterson) out of jealousy of her talent. Duncan sets out in the catacombs of Paris, finds Ursa's hiding place, and frees Jenny. After Duncan discovers that Ursa was manipulated by Carolyn, Carolyn provokes Ursa by telling him that Duncan tried to kill her. Furious, Ursa fights Duncan on the roof of the Opera, falls over the edge and dies. When Carolyn sees Ursa revive, she flees in terror and is hit by a car.
17	17	"Saving Grace"	Ray Austin	Elizabeth Baxter and Martin Broussellet	March 13, 1993	92120-17
Grace Chandel (Julia Stemberger) has been stalked by fellow Immortal Carlo Sendaro (Georges Corraface) ever since she left him decades ago. Duncan, who had a romantic relationship with Grace in 1660, protects her; while Tessa is jealous of Grace at first, she soon befriends her. Sendaro refuses to accept that Grace does not love him anymore and kidnaps her. Duncan frees Grace and fights Sendaro in the Paris Métro, where Sendaro is beheaded by a train.
18	18	"The Lady and the Tiger"	Robin Davis	Philip John Taylor	April 24, 1993	92121-18
Amanda (Elizabeth Gracen) brings Duncan to fellow Immortal Zachary Blaine (Jason Isaacs) in exchange for her life. Blaine attacks Duncan but their fight is interrupted, so Blaine threatens to take Amanda's head instead. Amanda dissuades him by telling him of a priceless manuscript and offering him to assist her in stealing it. Meanwhile, Duncan realizes Amanda and Blaine know each other, follows them and foils their robbery attempt. Blaine fights Duncan and loses but is beheaded by Amanda.
19	19	"Eye of the Beholder"	Dennis Berry	Christian Bouveron and Lawrence Shore	May 1, 1993	92124-19
Immortal Gabriel Piton (Nigel Terry) kills his lover Cynthia (Rachel Palmieri) and replaces her with top model Maya (Katia Douvalian). Richie meets Maya in a cafe and falls in love with her. Richie is jealous of Piton and, after hearing about Cynthia's death, suspects that Piton killed her and investigates Piton's flat. Interrupted by Piton, Richie escapes, but Piton is suspicious and sends Richie to prison in retaliation. Duncan decides to intervene and finds Piton about to kill Maya. Duncan fights Piton and beheads him.
20	20	"Avenging Angel"	Paolo Barzman	Fabrice Ziolkowski	May 8, 1993	92122-20
Alfred Cahill (Martin Kemp) is stabbed by a prostitute, dies and awakes Immortal. Made insane by the shock of becoming Immortal, Cahill believes he has become God's avenging angel and starts killing prostitutes and people around them, including a client and the pimp of Tessa's friend Elaine Trent (Sandra Nelson). After Cahill threatens Tessa, Duncan fights and beheads him.
21	21	"Nowhere to Run"	Dennis Berry	David Abramowitz	May 15, 1993	92125-21
Mark Rothwood (Jason Riddington) rapes Lori Bellian (Marion Cotillard) while Duncan, Tessa and Richie are visiting Mark's father Alan (Anthony Head). Lori's stepfather, Immortal Everett Bellian (Peter Guinness) learns of the rape and reacts by besieging Rothwood's chateau with his mercenaries. Duncan leads the defense of the chateau and foils their attacks. But when Alan Rothwood goes out with his son to talk to Bellian, he is shot by one of Bellian's men. Duncan fights Bellian, but spares him. Mark appears and threatens them with a gun, but is killed by Lori (in self-defense).
22	22	"The Hunters"	Paolo Barzman	Kevin Droney	May 22, 1993	92126-22
Duncan and his best friend, Immortal Hugh Fitzcairn (Roger Daltrey), find Darius beheaded in his chapel. They investigate his death, but the murderers kidnap Fitzcairn. Duncan discovers that they are mortals called the Hunters and that they have a particular tattoo on their wrists. Duncan finds a dilapidated old book in Darius' rectory and narrowly escapes capture, before following a Hunter to their headquarters. Their leader, James Horton (Peter Hudson), is about to guillotine Fitzcairn and manages to escape during the ensuing fight. Duncan frees Fitzcairn and together with Tessa and Richie they disperse Darius' ashes in the Seine River.

== Home media ==
Highlander: The Series Season One
Set details		Special features
22 episodes; 9-disc set (8 DVDs and 1 CD-ROM); 1.33:1 aspect ratio; English (Dolby Digital 5.1); English (Dolby Digital 2.0 Stereo)		Bill Panzer commentary on all episodes; "Behind The Scenes" : Promotional presentation of the season; "Watcher Chronicles" : Character profiles; Scripts of all episodes; Bloopers
Release dates		Bill Panzer commentary on all episodes; "Behind The Scenes" : Promotional presentation of the season; "Watcher Chronicles" : Character profiles; Scripts of all episodes; Bloopers
Region 1	Region 2	Bill Panzer commentary on all episodes; "Behind The Scenes" : Promotional presentation of the season; "Watcher Chronicles" : Character profiles; Scripts of all episodes; Bloopers
November 12, 2002	December 7, 2004	Bill Panzer commentary on all episodes; "Behind The Scenes" : Promotional presentation of the season; "Watcher Chronicles" : Character profiles; Scripts of all episodes; Bloopers
