= Highlander: Endgame =

- Theatrical release poster
- Directed by: Doug Aarniokoski
- Screenplay by: Joel Soisson
- Story by: Eric Bernt; Gillian Horvath; William N. Panzer
- Based on: Characters by Gregory Widen
- Produced by: Peter S. Davis; William N. Panzer
- Starring: Adrian Paul; Christopher Lambert; Bruce Payne; Lisa Barbuscia; Donnie Yen; Damon Dash; Sheila Gish
- Cinematography: Douglas Milsome
- Edited by: Chris Blunden; Rod Dean; Robert A. Ferretti; Tracy Granger; Michael N. Knue; Donald Paonessa
- Music by: Nick Glennie-Smith; Stephen Graziano
- Production companies: Davis-Panzer Productions; Dimension Films
- Distributed by: Miramax Films
- Release date: September 1, 2000
- Running time: 87 minutes
- Country: United States
- Languages: English; French; Gaelic
- Budget: $25 million
- Box office: $15.8 million

Highlander: Endgame is a 2000 American fantasy action film directed by Doug Aarniokoski and starring Adrian Paul, Christopher Lambert, Bruce Payne, and Lisa Barbuscia. It is the fourth theatrical release in the Highlander film series and serves as a continuation of the film Highlander (1986) and the television series of the same name (including the latter's spin-off Highlander: The Raven). The film reunites Duncan MacLeod, the lead character of the series, and Connor MacLeod, the lead character of the films. In the film, the Macleods need to deal against a new enemy named Jacob Kell, a powerful immortal who is willing to break any rule to win the Prize.

Highlander: Endgame marks Lambert's fifth and final appearance as Connor. Highlander: Endgame was released on September 1, 2000. A stand-alone sequel, Highlander: The Source was released seven years later, with Paul reprising his role.

== Plot ==
In A.D. 1555, Connor MacLeod returns to his former home in Glenfinnan, Scotland, to save his mother from village priest Jacob Kell. Kell executes Connor's mother for witchcraft. Enraged, Connor kills both Kell and Kell's adoptive father, Father Rainey. He sets Glenfinnan ablaze before leaving with his mother's body. Kell is reborn as an Immortal, and vows vengeance against Connor for Rainey's death. He spends the next four centuries killing people Connor cares about. Kell amasses great power by ignoring the rules of The Game; he recruits several lesser Immortals as disciples who overpower other Immortals so Kell can take their heads.

In 1994, Kell kills Connor's adopted daughter Rachel Ellenstein. Heartbroken, Connor departs for The Sanctuary, where Immortals are placed in a coma like state using drugs. It was originally intended for Immortals who had become tired of The Game and eternal life and to escape. However, it's true intention is revealed to be under the surveillance and management of a subgroup of Watchers to capture as many Immortals as they can to prevent The Prize from ever being won.

A decade later, Kell and his disciples attack the Sanctuary, and Connor is believed to have been beheaded along with the other Immortals there. Duncan MacLeod, compelled by a vision he has of the slaughter, begins to investigate. Meanwhile, Matthew Hale, the Watcher supervising the sanctuary, looks on at the carnage, and decides to turn to "volunteers" to refill their numbers. Duncan leaves London for New York, and goes to Connor's NYC loft, which was destroyed in the explosion that killed Rachel. Sensing an Immortal, he turns to see Kate, his wife from 200 years before. Then Kell's posse arrives, and fights Duncan (disregarding the rule of one-on-one combat). The fighting stops when Kell arrives. However, Carlos shoots Duncan, who falls on a spike, rendering him unconscious. Kell is furious with Carlos, and beheads him – as the Quickening begins, a van drives up to where Duncan fell, and takes him away.

After awakening, Duncan realizes that he has been taken by Watchers. They want to keep him in the Sanctuary so that the Prize cannot be won by any Immortal. He is later saved with the help of Methos and Watcher Joe Dawson. He convinces them to take him to Connor's grave, where he found Connor alive but not well. Connor reveals he was set free so Kell could continue to emotionally torture him. Kell arrives with Kate and reveals he will kill Duncan in order to torture Connor. Goaded by Kell to kill him, Connor's anger at the deaths of all his loved ones leaves him unable to put up a fight and is easily defeated. Duncan later confronts Kate (now using the alias "Faith") at a fashion-shoot, and asks her why she is with Kell. She tells him how much she hates the fact that she will never have children or grow old and die, and believes that Kell understands her pain. Duncan must earn her forgiveness, or face her as an embittered part of Kell's faction. Later on in his hotel room, Kate arrives after having a chat with Kell, and the two make love. Duncan touches the scar that was caused when he made her Immortal, and apologizes to Faith for what he did. She tells Duncan that she will never forgive him; he tells her that he will wait, even if it takes centuries and he will continue to carry that hope inside him.

Ultimately, Kell executes his group in a mock Last Supper to gain their powers, including possibly Faith. Later on a rooftop, Connor meets Duncan and intentionally starts a sword-fight with him. Telling him that neither one of them can defeat Kell alone, Connor convinces Duncan that he must allow himself to be beheaded in order for Duncan to have enough power to rival Kell. After an emotional goodbye, Duncan ends the fight, sorrowfully beheading his beloved clansman, Connor.

Soon after, Duncan and Kell engage in a final battle. Hale attempts to interfere and take Duncan back to the Sanctuary, but Joe arrives and shoots him dead. Just before Kell is victorious, Connor's spirit takes control of Duncan, which gives him the strength to continue. Duncan then decapitates Kell, avenging Connor and all of Connor's loved ones. Duncan absorbs all of Kell's power, taking his place as the most powerful immortal in existence. He then goes to Glencoe, Scotland to bury Connor next to Heather and Ramírez.

=== Alternative ending (Producer's Cut) ===
After Duncan buries Connor, he returns to the United States to witness the fireworks display for New Years Day. After feeling an immortal's presence, Kate appears and explains that Kell spared her life. After proclaiming that her "Faith"-persona is "dead," and that she is giving "Kate" another try, she and Duncan share a kiss, suggesting that they will reconcile their marriage and live together forever.

== Cast ==
- Adrian Paul as Duncan MacLeod
- Christopher Lambert as Connor MacLeod
- Bruce Payne as Jacob Kell
- Lisa Barbuscia as Kate Devaney MacLeod / Faith
- Donnie Yen as Jin Ke
- Jim Byrnes as Joe Dawson
- Peter Wingfield as Methos
- Damon Dash as Carlos Dash
- Beatie Edney as Heather MacDonald MacLeod
- Sheila Gish as Rachel Ellenstein
- Oris Erhuero as Winston Erhuero
- Ian Paul Cassidy as Cracker Bob
- Adam "Edge" Copeland as Lachlan
- June Watson as Caiolin MacLeod
- Donald Douglas as Father Rainey
- Doug Aarniokoski as Kirk

== Production ==
Early drafts of the screenplay differed greatly from the final cut in several respects. The Kate character was originally named "Alexis"; most of the flashback scenes occurred in Shanghai instead of Ireland; Paris was the original location of Methos's home rather than London; Duncan MacLeod lived on his Parisian barge during the modern-day sequences; and Hugh Fitzcairn appeared during the Shanghai flashbacks. The titles of the various drafts included Highlander IV: The Immortals, Highlander: The Search for Connor, and Highlander: World Without End. Gregory Widen, writer of the original Highlander, worked on the early drafts and was in talks to direct the film. Widen had previously directed the film The Prophecy, which he also wrote. Portions of Widen's writing were used for Endgame, though he received only a "Characters Created By" credit.

The film features several shots from the original Highlander. The first is a computer-altered and enhanced shot of Glenfinnan, which was originally the shot of Connor walking away from his village. The second is a shot of the Silvercup sign, pulled from the scene of the Kurgan taking Brenda Wyatt to the building. And in the rooftop Quickening, two shots of Connor and Heather MacLeod together are taken from the first film. Castle Stalker is seen briefly in the film during Connor's flashback scene. This building was also seen in Monty Python and the Holy Grail.

Donnie Yen served as the film's martial arts choreographer and also played the role of Jin Ke, who was based on a real historical figure: Jing Ke, renowned for his failed assassination of the Chinese emperor Qin Shi Huang. Hip-Hop producer Damon Dash makes an appearance as one of Jacob Kell's Immortal minions. Professional wrestler Adam Copeland, known as "Edge" in the World Wrestling Federation (WWF, now WWE), makes a cameo appearance as Lachlan. A reference is made to Copeland's wrestling persona when Duncan says to Lachlan, "Looks like you've lost your edge, lad."

The movie was meant to act as a bridge between Highlander: The Series and the spin-off series Highlander: The Raven which was continuing on television back in 1999. But these plans started to go awry when Raven was canceled due to low ratings and the change in syndication, as well as production delays, started occurring due to cast availability problems. Dimension Films, which took on the project as a way of invigorating the film series, realized that its plans for the film were not going to meet expectations, and scaled back on its release.

Filming began on October 22, 1999, and ended on March 7, 2000. Much of the bulk of filming happened in Romania, a decision which was opposed by the producers.

Endgame's theatrical distributor, Dimension Films, demanded that cuts be made to the film to give it a faster pace. The deleted footage contained exposition necessary to understanding the Highlander universe, resulting in a theatrical cut that was criticized for being incomprehensible to audiences unfamiliar with the earlier films. An extended cut with restored footage was later released on DVD. (See alternate versions below.)

== Alternative versions ==
The DVD release features a 101-minute "producers' cut" which features improved visual effects, sound mixing, and color-timing, and restores numerous scenes of exposition intended to make the story more easily understandable for audiences unfamiliar with the Highlander franchise. The "producers' cut" includes the "Kate lives" ending and removes the line of dialogue in which Methos refers to the Sanctuary as holy ground, which was criticized by fans.

The Region 1 (United States and Canada) DVD includes, as a bonus feature, a rough workprint cut of the film. The visual quality of the rough cut is rather poor, with unfinished special effects and a timecode visible at all times, and alternating between widescreen and full-screen. This cut features a subplot involving Connor giving a Christmas tree to an orphanage every Christmas, an activity picked up by Duncan after Connor's death. Kate does not appear in this version of the film at its conclusion, unlike the producers' cut included on the DVD. The rough cut also notably features an extended version of the "Last Supper" scene in which Jin Ke plunges his sword into a wall and beheads himself after realizing that he cannot beat Kell, thereby denying Kell the opportunity to kill him. In the other versions of the film, this scene was edited to make it appear that Kell beheads Jin Ke (off-screen) along with the rest of the group.

=== Producers cut ===
The producers of the film disagreed with Dimension Films over the running length and story structure of the film. They were unsatisfied with the theatrical cut, and upon its DVD release, they re-edited the film and added twelve minutes of new footage, which included:

- A new opening sequence, in which we see Duncan and Connor roaming the streets of New York and Duncan buying a hot dog. Connor tells Duncan that he has an errand to run, and leaves a concerned Duncan behind after telling him to "watch his back." The scene goes to Rachel walking towards the antiques store.
- The shots of the photographs with Rachel and Connor in them are not in the DVD cut. Instead we see Rachel enter the store, go to the loft and find a TV playing a video of herself and Connor at various points of her life. The phone rings and when she answers, the store explodes just as Connor walks up to it.
- The DVD cut has Duncan walking past a payphone on his way to Methos. He answers the phone and a woman (later revealed as Faith) tells him, "Whatever you fear about Connor MacLeod, fear the worst." She says that she is a friend and hangs up. As Duncan walks on, we see a watcher named Matthew spying on Duncan from a cafe saying into his cellphone, "He's on the move."
- During the scene where Duncan is at Connor's destroyed loft, the posse enter and Winston says, "It's time to show our Immortal brother a thing or two." Cracker Bob has more of an entrance. We see him crash in on his motorcycle swings his bat and says, "Someone order a club sandwich?" Duncan mocks his outfit and Bob complains to Faith.
- A Flashback to Kate and Duncan's wedding is re-edited. We see Duncan sitting at the table with Kate, and one of their friends gets drunk and collapses while urging the two to kiss. They do, then we see Duncan, Kate and their wedding guest dancing. From there, we see Connor walking through the door and embracing Duncan.
- After Duncan and Faith separate at the studio (the fashion show scene), we see them roaming the streets. Faith goes to Kell's temple, then her apartment. Inside, we see Kell waiting for her. The dialogue makes it clear that they have a sexual relationship and Kell suspects that she may turn over to Duncan's side. We go from this scene to Faith walking about the streets of New York and then entering Duncan's hotel room where they have an intimate moment.
- The fight scene between Duncan and Kell is extended.
- We see a scene where Duncan is bandaging a leg wound and taking off his coat. The watcher Matthew is pointing a rifle at him. "Just watching," someone says. Matthew turns and Joe is standing behind him. Matthew raises his rifle at Joe, but Joe shoots him with a revolver. Matthew dies.
- Duncan's face morphing into Connor's, and back, a few times is reduced in their visibility and intensity.

Among other changes was the edited blurring of a large JVC billboard that was prominently featured during Connor's death scene in the theatrical cut.

== Theatrical trailer ==
The trailers for the film feature several shots showing Kell using mystical abilities (such as stopping a sword in midair with some sort of force field, cloning himself and holding an orb with Connor's screaming head inside of it). In addition to this, Connor and Duncan are shown emerging from some sort of portal. None of this footage made it into any released version of the film, and the footage is only seen in the trailer. In an interview prior to the film's release, Douglas Aarniokoski stated that these shots were never intended for inclusion in any finished cut of the movie — they were shot exclusively for its trailer, instead. Aarniokoski further suggested that this is common practice for feature films.

No mention of Kell's magical abilities exists in the online version of an early screenplay. Aarniokoski said that this decision was taken as it was felt that introducing further magic elements would have weakened the characterisation.

== Reception ==
On Rotten Tomatoes, the film has an approval rating of 11% based on reviews from 54 critics, with an average rating of 3.30/10. The site's critics consensus reads, "The fourth and supposedly last Highlander movie is a confusing mess, complete with bad acting and dialogue." On Metacritic, the film has a weighted average score of 21 out of 100 based on 16 critics, indicating "generally unfavorable" reviews. Audiences polled by CinemaScore gave the film an average grade of "B-" on an A+ to F scale.

Elvis Mitchell of The New York Times gave Endgame a mildly positive review, saying: "It's nice to see mindless violence back in a B picture, where it belongs, and the swordplay is impressive. When [the movie] sticks to the hand-to-hand battles and doesn't try to offer deeper thoughts on the life of an immortal, it works on its own terms." IGN gave the DVD release of Endgame a score of 7 out of 10, saying that "fans will be pleased," adding: "Endgame proves to be both true to the spirit of the first film and the television series, [it has] a solid story to tell, [and it] features the best fight sequences of the series."

Andrew O'Hehir of Salon.com said, "Personally, I enjoyed it about the way I enjoyed the Mortal Kombat movies, meaning that its genuine fun and its unintentionally ridiculous moments are roughly in balance." Lisa Schwarzbaum of Entertainment Weekly remarked: "[Fans] will be thrilled that Connor MacLeod and his fellow clansman Duncan MacLeod engage in a vein-popping showdown to see which immortal will bump off the other, thereby achieving a quickening of multiorgasmic proportions. Those who aren't in the cult of this popular genre fantasy not only won't understand what the previous sentence is about, but may also wonder what's so great about perpetual life if it entails shlepping from one badly lit, cheesily art-directed, peat bog-colored century to another, spouting hollow dialogue."

Travis Eddings of Film Threat gave the film half a star out of five, saying: "After viewing Highlander: Endgame, it's obvious that Aarniokoski has no idea how to make a film. ... The only reason why this film earns one-half of a star instead of zero is due to some unintended laughs. It's funny to see what passes as acting in this movie." James Brundage of FilmCritic.com gave the film one and half stars out of five, saying: "Highlander: Endgame possesses all of the elements of a straight-to-video action movie. Cheap special effects that look cool, weak characters that still pull heartstrings, and a bunch of actors no one really knows unless you have seen this or that obscure flick. And, taking that view, one wonders why the hell I even had to watch Highlander: Endgame in theatres."

Carlo Cavagna of About Film called the film "a disaster," adding: "The plot and the characters' motivations are nonsense. Lambert's character has nowhere to go, and his once-magnetic glower is tired and worn. Several opportunities for spectacular action are squandered because the movie's villain has a tendency to execute summarily his own henchmen. Paul's modicum of charisma, director Douglas Aarniokoski's broad panoramas that recall the original Highlander, and Lambert's amusing skirmishes with a Scottish accent are not enough to provide any redeeming value.

== Box office ==
At the North American box office, the film opened at #5, grossing $6,223,330 in its opening weekend. It went on to gross $12,811,858 domestically and gather $3,031,750 from international markets for a worldwide total of $15,843,608.
