= Highlander: The Series season 4 =

Season of television series

Highlander: The Series
- Season 4
- DVD box set
- No. of episodes: 22

Release
- Original network: Syndication
- Original release: September 25, 1995 – May 26, 1996

Season chronology
- ← Previous; Season 3 Next → Season 5

The fourth season of the American drama/adventure television series Highlander began airing 25 September 1995 and finished on 26 May 1996. The series continues to follow the adventures of Duncan MacLeod, a 400-year-old Immortal who can only die if he is beheaded. MacLeod is involved in the Game, an ongoing battle during which all Immortals have to behead each other until only one is left.

== Cast ==
=== Main cast ===
- Adrian Paul ... Duncan MacLeod
- Stan Kirsch ... Richie Ryan
- Jim Byrnes ... Joe Dawson

=== Supporting cast ===
- Soumaya Akaaboune ... Aliya
- Philip Akin ... Charlie DeSalvo
- Sean Allan ... Simon Killian
- Guy Amram ... Kelly
- Eileen Barrett ... Alice Markum
- Veronique Baylaucq ... Annie
- Kabir Bedi ... Kamir
- Luc Bernard ... Inspector Deon
- Wolfgang Bodison ... Andrew Cord
- Crispin Bonham-Carter ... Danny Cimoli
- Stéphane Boucher ... Edward Bellamy
- Geoffroy Boutan ... Claude Massanet
- Benjamin Boyer ... David Shapiro
- Chris Bradford ... Young Joe Dawson
- Jeremy Brudenell ... Robert de Valicourt
- Patrick Burgel ... Albert
- Lisa Butler ... Melissa
- Nadia Cameron ... Rebecca Horne
- Nicholas Campbell ... Kit O'Brady
- Sean Campbell ... Sergeant Merion
- Valeria Cavalli ... Dominique
- Nicola Cavendish ... Queen Anne
- Carl Chase ... Robert Davis / 2 episodes
- Byron Chief-Moon ... James Coltec
- Rae Dawn Chong ... Claudia Jardine
- Garrison Chrisjohn ... Dr. Weldon
- Ewan "Sudsy" Clark ... George Lalonde
- Morgan Cooke ... Antoine
- Luc Corbeil ... Merriman
- Garvin Cross ... Ray
- Roger Daltrey ... Hugh Fitzcairn
- Stephen Dimopoulos ... Vince Petrovic
- Tim Dixon ... Harry
- Vernon Dobtcheff ... Hamad
- Yan Epstein ... Jean Dumar
- Ben Feitelson ... Nasir Al Deneb
- Michel Feller ... Mikel
- Myles Ferguson ... Kenny
- Brent Fidler ... Jeremy Beaufort
- Shannon Finnegan ... Sarah
- Roland Gift ... Xavier St. Cloud
- Elizabeth Gracen ... Amanda / 5 episodes
- Manuel Guillot ... Emile
- Anna Hagan ... Mary MacLeod
- Ron Halder ... Walter Graham
- Jamie Harris ... Daniel Geiger
- Phil Hayes ... Alan Wells
- Rachel Hayward ... Valerie Meech
- Ocean Hellman ... Alexa Bond
- Fred Henderson ... Desantis
- Tim Henry ... Jim Rainey
- Anna Hogan ... Mary MacLeod
- Laurie Holden ... Debra Campbell
- Lisa Howard ... Anne Lindsey / 2 episodes
- Peter Hudson ... James Horton
- Anthony Hyde ... Nathan Stern
- Robert Iseman ... Mike
- Michael J. Jackson ... Sean Burns / 2 episodes
- Liliana Komorowska ... Mara Leonin
- Simon Kunz ... Damon Case
- Darcy Laurie ... Harry Kant
- Kevin Lesmister ... Earl of Welsley
- Justin Louis ... Peter Kanis
- Roger Lumont ... Marco Mastina
- David Mackay ... Gremio
- Laura Marine ... Nancy Goddard
- Sue Mathew ... Vashti
- Scott McNeil ... Robert MacLeod
- Kevin McNulty ... David Markum
- Graham McTavish ... Charlie
- Travis MacDonald ... Mark Roszca
- Andrew MacGregor ... Donal
- Patrick Mille ... Jean Philippe de LeFaye III
- Kristin Minter ... Rachel MacLeod / 3 episodes
- Billy J. Mitchell ... Brian McSwain
- Alison Moir ... Diane Terrin
- Robert Moloney ... Kevin McSwain
- Romina Mondello ... Irina Galati
- Gresby Nash ... Andrew Donnelly
- Carsten Norgaard ... Kanwulf
- Tracy Olson ... Lord Sewell
- Peter Outerbridge ... Paul Kinman
- Cécile Pallas ... Gina de Valicourt
- Molly Parker ... Alice Ramsey
- Gerard Plunkett ... James Bailey
- Michael Preston ... Terence Kincaid
- Benjamin Ratner ... Bryce Korland
- Jeffrey Renn ... Young Ian Bancroft
- Callum Keith Rennie ... Tyler King
- Kim Restell ... Julie
- Christine Rivere ... Nadia
- Struan Rodger ... Bonnie Prince Charlie
- Greg Rogers ... Detective Sheridan
- Ricco Ross ... Kassim
- Jenafor Ryane ... Alicia
- Karim Salah ... Boadin Al Deneb
- George Salmon ... James
- William Samples ... Bruce
- Tony Scanling ... Lord Keating
- Dougray Scott ... Warren Cochrane
- Tomer Sisley ... Reza
- Veena Sood ... Shandra Devane / 2 episodes
- Brent Stait ... Colonel Ramsey
- Jill Teed ... Kaayla Brooks
- Carla Temple ... Denise
- Venus Terzo ... The Duchess
- John Tierney ... Angus
- Stacey Travis ... Agent Delaney
- Stephen Tremblay ... Jacob Galati / 2 episodes
- Yee Jee Tso ... Gerald
- Ann Turkel ... Kristin
- Christine Upright-Letain ... Andrea Henson
- Emmanuelle Vaugier ... Maria Alcobar
- Pruitt Taylor Vince ... Mikey Bellows
- Louise Vincent ... Lina Cimoli
- Matthew Walker ... Ian MacLeod
- Jesse Joe Walsh ... Jack Shapiro / 2 episodes
- Dave 'Squatch' Ward ... Cisco
- Marc Warren ... Morgan d'Estaing
- Alec Willows ... Martin Millay
- Peter Wingfield ... Methos / 8 episodes
- Joel Wirkkunen ... McPhee

== Episodes ==
No. overall	No. in season	Title	Directed by	Written by	Original release date	Prod. code
67	1	"Homeland"	Adrian Paul	David Tynan	September 25, 1995	95401
Duncan buys a Celtic bracelet that he once gave to the love of his mortal life and then buried with her after her death. He returns to Glenfinnan to return the bracelet to her grave and learns of several gruesome ritualistic killings based around the Viking Immortal Kanwulf the Destroyer who killed Duncan's father. Naturally, Duncan must get to the bottom of the killings and keep his head in the process. He also struggles to avoid suspicion of MacLeod descendant Rachel, but she soon learns his returning of the bracelet and her suspicion vanishes. Duncan finally tracks down Kanwulf and avenges his father.
68	2	"Brothers in Arms"	Charles Wilkinson	Morrie Ruvinsky	October 2, 1995	95402
Friends become enemies and the past is revealed when Immortal Andrew Cord is gunned down and Duncan discovers the sniper is Charlie DeSalvo, his good friend who used to run the dojo. Charlie, who left Duncan to fight the good fight in the Balkans with his love, Mara, is after Cord, who murdered her. Joe knows Cord as the man who saved his life in Vietnam after a mine explosion took his legs and unintentionally played a part in Joe joining the Watchers. Joe begs Duncan not to fight him. Duncan confronts Cord and tells him to keep away from Charlie. Cord agrees, but tracks down Charlie and kills him. Duncan finds Charlie and tells him about his Immortality before he dies. Torn between his loyalty to Cord and friendship with Duncan, Joe reluctantly tells Duncan where Cord is. Duncan beheads Cord but tells Joe that their friendship is over.
69	3	"The Innocent"	Dennis Berry	Alan Swayze	October 9, 1995	95403
Richie encounters Mikey, a huge Immortal of limited mental development and a fascination with trains. Richie takes Mikey home to Duncan, who advises him that taking care of Mikey could be trouble. Duncan remembers coming to the aid of a young Indian in trouble, when his help got the man killed. While Duncan faces Tyler King, an Immortal who's coming after Mikey, Richie must find the maturity to take responsibility for Mikey's situation. At last, Duncan fights and beheads King, but Mikey kills two police officers, and when he is told that an eternal imprisonment awaits him, he commits suicide, laying his neck across a rail just before a train arrives. His Quickening goes to Richie, who is nearby.
70	4	"Leader of the Pack"	Mario Azzopardi	Lawrence Shore	October 16, 1995	95404
The past comes back to haunt Richie when he spies Mark Roszca, the street punk who killed Tessa and gave him his first death. Richie is determined to go after Roszca and avenge Tessa's death. Meanwhile, Duncan is distracted by the return of an old Immortal enemy, Peter Kanis—a master of hounds who uses his pack of dogs to track and exhaust his prey. This time his prey is Duncan MacLeod. Borrowing a female dog from the pound, Duncan traps the dogs in a room, and kills Kanis. Richie returns, having not had the strength to kill Roszca.
71	5	"Double Eagle"	Mario Azzopardi	David Tynan	October 23, 1995	95405
Duncan's old friend, Kit O'Brady, comes into town in search of a good race horse and a change of luck. Duncan knew Kit back in Gold Rush San Francisco, when Kit ran the Double Eagle Saloon. Kit lost the Double Eagle to Amanda in a poker game, who then renamed it Queen of Spades and has blamed her ever since for his string of bad luck—and he's vowed to kill her if he ever sees her again. When Amanda chooses to breeze back into Duncan's life while Kit is there (in addition, her hatred for Kit hasn't wavered either), Duncan is hard pressed to keep them apart and to keep them from killing each other.
72	6	"Reunion"	Dennis Baxter	Elizabeth Baxter	October 30, 1995	95406
Running for his life from Immortal Terence Kincaid, Kenny runs straight into Anne Lindsey's emergency room. Stashing Kenny in the hospital chapel, Anne calls Duncan for help. Duncan agrees to harbor him for one night only, but when Duncan gets him home, Kenny discovers his long-lost teacher there, none other than Amanda. She discovered him after his first death. However, it is revealed that Kenny and Kincaid have teamed up to kill Duncan. Kenny keeps Amanda from interfering, but Duncan kills Kincaid. Kenny tries to attack Duncan, but Amanda threatens to kill Kenny if he does. Kenny runs off in a rage.
73	7	"The Colonel"	Dennis Berry	Drunford King	November 12, 1995	95407
World War I was officially over when Immortal Colonel Simon Killian ordered his troops into one last bloody attack on the Germans. Duncan witnessed the massacre and made sure his testimony at Killian's court martial got Killian locked up forever. Seventy years later, Killian escapes to return the favor. Meanwhile, Amanda has found a new friend, Melissa, a young thief out for thrills. Melissa wants to be just like Amanda so she changes her hair and her clothes to look just like her—so much so that Killian kidnaps her, thinking she's Duncan's girlfriend. Then he kidnaps Duncan himself by locking him in an abandoned military base. He is released by Joe, who understands that it is unfair, and breaks his principle not to interfere. Once free, Duncan chases and beheads Killian.
74	8	"Reluctant Heroes"	Neill Fearnley	Scott Peters	November 19, 1995	95408
Coming home from the movies, Duncan and Richie witness a murder attempt on grocer David Markum. Duncan saves Markum, but Markum's wife Alice is hit and killed. Duncan and Richie go after the murderer and discover he's Immortal Paul Kinman just as the police arrive and arrest him. Duncan wants Kinman's head. Kinman killed MacLeod's good friend Dennis Keating when they were in the court of Queen Anne. FBI agent Kaayla Brooks asks Duncan and Richie if they can testify against Kinman, but Duncan refuses because he can't kill Kinman if Kinman's in jail. Kinman eventually escapes jail with Brooks' help, but kills her too. Finally, Duncan confronts and beheads Kinman. Duncan later informs Markum that Kinman did not get away with his crimes, satisfying the grocer.
75	9	"The Wrath of Kali"	Duane Clark	David Tynan	November 26, 1995	95409
An ancient statue of the Hindu goddess Kali is purchased by the university where Duncan teaches and is put on display. Its creator, Immortal Kamir, who has been searching for it for centuries, arrives determined to take it back to its home in India. Shandra Devane, the half-Indian department chairman who found the piece for the university, is equally determined to keep it. Duncan, who has known Kamir since the Raj period, when India was controlled by the British Empire, knows Kamir is the last of the Thugee, a cult who worshipped Kali by ritually strangling her enemies. When Kamir goes after Shandra, believing she has betrayed her religion, Duncan kills him.
76	10	"Chivalry"	Paolo Barzman	Michael O'Mahoney, Sasha Reins	December 3, 1995	95410
Nearly 350 years ago, Duncan was the devoted lover of Kristin Gilles, a beautiful Immortal who taught him to be a gentleman. When he found another love, Gilles refused to let him go, killing his new lover. Now Gilles is sharing her bed with another new Immortal full of potential—Richie. Methos, who knows Duncan has never been able to kill Gilles because of his strict code of honor, has arrived in town to watch the fireworks as Duncan tries to convince Richie that his newfound love is dangerous. Duncan fights Gilles and disarms her, but once again cannot take her head because of his chivalrous nature. Methos then arrives and tells Gilles to pick up her sword. Methos wins the short sword fight that ensues, disarming and then beheading Gilles.
77	11	"Timeless"	Duane Clark	Karen Harris	February 4, 1996	95411
World famous pianist Claudia Jardine has a secret that even she doesn't know—she's destined to become Immortal. Immortal impresario Walter Graham, who has guided the careers of mortal greats like Shakespeare, sees his chance to shepherd Claudia's genius forever and kills her, triggering her latent Immortality—against Duncan's better judgment. Meanwhile, Methos has fallen for Alexa, a waitress at Joe's who has a secret of her own.
78	12	"The Blitz"	Paolo Barzman	Morrie Ruvinsky	February 11, 1996	95412
ER trauma surgeon Anne Lindsey responds to the call for help after an explosion devastates a subway station, but when a subsequent explosion rocks the station, Anne is trapped. Duncan remembers WWII London where he and the woman he loved, reporter Diane Terrin, were trapped in a bombed Underground station during the Blitz, running out of time and air. Duncan is desperate to rescue Anne before he loses her like he lost Diane. Anne suddenly goes into labor, but Duncan is able to help her give birth.
79	13	"Something Wicked"	Dennis Berry	David Tynan	February 18, 1996	95413
A native American Immortal, Coltec, is a shaman who has fought many sinful Immortals, absorbing their vicious Quickenings. But the evil, forming into a Dark Quickening, begins to overwhelm him, and his friend Duncan must defeat him... without becoming evil himself. Duncan tries but ultimately fails. Left with no other choice, Duncan takes Coltec’s head and succumbs to the Dark Quickening himself. He tries to kill Richie, but Joe interferes. Duncan escapes and flees to France.
80	14	"Deliverance"	Dennis Berry	David Tynan	February 25, 1996	95414
Duncan arrives in France, leaving a trail of hate and destruction in his wake. Methos finds him and discovers just how evil Duncan has become when he takes the head of a pure Immortal, Sean Burns, and tries to take Methos' head on Holy Ground. However, Methos hands Duncan his father’s sword, causing Duncan’s good to fight back. He takes Duncan to a spiritual pool, where Duncan battles his evil in his mind. With Sean’s Light Quickening as a part of himself now, Duncan destroys the evil and gains control of himself again. Methos reveals that he alerted Rachel and she brought the claymore to help Duncan jog his memory.
81	15	"Promises"	Paolo Barzman	Lawrence Shore	March 2, 1996	95415
In 1755, Duncan made a promise in order to save the life of a young friend. It comes back to haunt him when Kassim, the Immortal to whom he made the promise, demands that Duncan assassinate the tyrannical dictator of a small Middle Eastern country. When his refusal gets a good man killed and makes Kassim put Rachel's life in jeopardy for revenge, Duncan is torn between doing what he believes is right and keeping his promise. Duncan fights Kassim, but spares him and frees Rachel. Rachel returns to Scotland while Duncan completes his promise.
82	16	"Methuselah's Gift"	Adrian Paul	Michael O'Mahoney, Sasha Reins	April 28, 1996	95416
When masked thugs try to take Amanda's head in her sleep and steal the crystal given to her long ago by Rebecca, Amanda and Duncan investigate. They discover the crystal may be part of the Methuselah Stone, a mystic talisman said to impart eternal life and invulnerability to the wearer and the Watchers were in possession of the rest of the crystals. Amanda’s investigation leads to her finding Methos in the Watcher headquarters and in possession of the remaining crystals. He was collecting all the crystals from the headquarters in hopes of using the stone to heal Alexa, his dying girlfriend. Watchers Nathan Stern and Daniel Geiger, out Methos as an Immortal and negotiate a trade, the stone for Methos' life. Before the transaction is complete, Geiger kills Stern, revealing himself to be the leader of the plot to steal the Stone, wanting its promise of Immortality for himself. Duncan tosses Geiger the last piece of the stone, but at his order to kill the Immortals, they fight back. Geiger is killed by Amanda and the stone falls into the river, in pieces.
83	17	"The Immortal Cimoli"	Yves Lafaye	Scott Peters	May 5, 1996	95417
Two-bit magician Danny Cimoli gets a whole new act when he's hit by a truck and becomes The Immortal Cimoli. Amanda and Duncan find him in a circus, taking bullets in the heart to the delight of the audience and blissfully unaware he's now part of The Game. Duncan tries to get Danny into shape when former medieval Crusader Damon Case comes to claim his head, but Danny's more interested in achieving "real" Immortality—going down in history as a magician even greater than Houdini. Duncan is forced to kill Case and chooses to let Danny pursue his dream.
84	18	"Through a Glass, Darkly"	Dennis Berry	Alan Swayze	May 12, 1996	95418
Duncan's old friend Warren Cochrane is hiding a horrible secret he can't bear to remember. Realizing that an Immortal who won't remember what he is, is soon a dead Immortal, Duncan tries to help Warren by reminding him of the history they shared together, of their battles for Scotland's freedom, and of their mission to return Bonnie Prince Charlie to the throne. But Duncan might have helped his friend more by letting the past stay buried.
85	19	"Double Jeopardy"	Charles Wilkinson	David Tynan	May 3, 1996	95419
Agent Delaney returns to Paris to solve a string of robberies that appear to be perpetrated by Xavier St. Cloud. Xavier's old student, Morgan d'Estaing, is using his old teacher's methods to commit these crimes. After D’Estaing poisons one of the Parisian inspectors and almost kills Delaney, Duncan has to find a way to balance the rules of the game while protecting Delaney from a ruthless killer. Despite being stabbed with a poisonous knife, Duncan outsmarts D’Estaing, taking his head and Quickening. (Note that this episode was held over until season 5 in the U.S.)
86	20	"Till Death"	Dennis Berry	Michael O'Mahoney, Sasha Reins	May 19, 1996	95420
When Gina and Robert de Valicourt met 300 years ago, even Gina's suitors Duncan and Fitzcairn had to admit they were destined for each other. Each century, as Robert and Gina renewed their wedding vows before their friends and fellow Immortals, their love grew stronger. But now their marriage is on the rocks. Duncan decides it's up to him to reunite the once happy couple, and he enlists a very unwilling accomplice in his cunning plan.
87	21	"Judgment Day"	Gerard Hameline	David Tynan	May 26, 1996	95421
Watcher chief, Jack Shapiro abducts Joe Dawson to try him on the charge of treason for his friendship with Duncan. Watcher deaths have risen dramatically since Joe first told Duncan about the Watchers, and they believe the duo are responsible. Methos tries to help prove their innocence, but soon, they realize the Tribunal has already made a decision and the trial was only a show. The verdict is accelerated when Shapiro’s son, David, has been found dead. Unknown to the Watchers, a nimble Immortal is hunting them down, one by one. Shapiro leaves to go to David’s burial, while Joe is taken to be executed. Just as Duncan is about to rescue Joe, he sees the nimble Immortal gun down all the Watchers present, only injuring Joe and escaping. Duncan takes Joe to Methos’ hideout, while he makes it his mission to stop the nimble Immortal from slaughtering Watchers.
88	22	"One Minute to Midnight"	Dennis Berry	David Tynan	September 28, 1996	95422
Shapiro has gone mad in a bid to avenge David’s death, believing Duncan has been killing Watchers with Joe’s help. On his orders, every Watcher in France is hunting for Duncan to bring him in, poising Immortals and Watchers at the brink of war. Duncan discovers that the real killer is Jacob Galati, a Gypsy Duncan once traveled with, who has vowed to destroy all the mortals who wear the Watcher tattoo. He is convinced they are all out to destroy Immortals, since the rogue watchers, led by James Horton, executed his beloved wife. Duncan tries to explain that those Watchers were rogues but Galati no longer has anything to live for and will not stop his spree. Joe, with Methos’ help, is able to knock out Galati and take him before the Watchers for a meeting, only for all three of them to see Shapiro has double-crossed them. Shapiro murders Galati and Duncan takes the Quickening. Shapiro tries to go after him next, but Joe holds him at gunpoint. Shapiro prepares the Watchers for a full-scale war against Immortals to avenge David, only for Duncan to force him to rescind the orders. Shapiro is expelled for his actions and Joe is allowed back in. Duncan, Methos and Joe go separate ways. (Note that this episode was held over until season 5 in the U.S.)

== Home media ==
Highlander: The Series Season Four
Set details		Special features
22 episodes; 9-disc set (8 DVDs and 1 CD-ROM); 1.33:1 aspect ratio; English (Dolby Digital 5.1); English (Dolby Digital 2.0 Stereo)		Never-before-seen footage including deleted, alternate and recently discovered scenes; Cast and crew interviews; Commentaries with cast members including Adrian Paul, Stan Kirsch, Gillian Horvath and Anthony Delongis; Bloopers; Still gallery; CD-Rom with complete episode screenplays; Filmographies and Highlander trivia
Release dates		Never-before-seen footage including deleted, alternate and recently discovered scenes; Cast and crew interviews; Commentaries with cast members including Adrian Paul, Stan Kirsch, Gillian Horvath and Anthony Delongis; Bloopers; Still gallery; CD-Rom with complete episode screenplays; Filmographies and Highlander trivia
Region 1	Region 2	Never-before-seen footage including deleted, alternate and recently discovered scenes; Cast and crew interviews; Commentaries with cast members including Adrian Paul, Stan Kirsch, Gillian Horvath and Anthony Delongis; Bloopers; Still gallery; CD-Rom with complete episode screenplays; Filmographies and Highlander trivia
April 13, 2004		Never-before-seen footage including deleted, alternate and recently discovered scenes; Cast and crew interviews; Commentaries with cast members including Adrian Paul, Stan Kirsch, Gillian Horvath and Anthony Delongis; Bloopers; Still gallery; CD-Rom with complete episode screenplays; Filmographies and Highlander trivia
