= Robert Ito =

Canadian actor (born 1931)

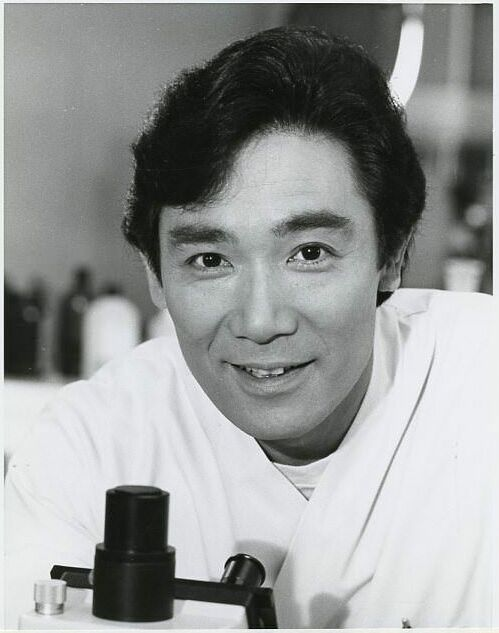
- Ito c. 1981 in a publicity photo for Quincy, M.E. (1976–1983)
- Born: July 2, 1931 (age 95); Vancouver, British Columbia, Canada
- Occupations: Actor, dancer
- Years active: 1965–2008

Robert Ito (born July 2, 1931) is a Canadian retired actor and dancer. He is known for his television and film work, including the roles of Sam Fujiyama on the 1976–83 NBC series Quincy, M.E. and Larry Mishima on the 1980s CBS primetime soap opera Falcon Crest, and a variety of voice acting for animation. He was nominated for a Gemini Award for his performance in the 1994 film Trial at Fortitude Bay.

== Career ==
Ito was a dancer with the National Ballet of Canada before coming to Broadway and dancing in such shows as "Flower Drum Song" (1960-1961). He turned to acting in the mid-1960s, often playing Asian characters. He appeared three times (as different characters) in the 1970s TV series Kung Fu; first as a Chinese rail worker in the two-hour pilot film, as a Chinese bandit named Captain Lee in the episode "The Way of Violence Has No Mind", and as a ninja in the episode "The Assassin".

He likewise portrayed two different Korean characters in episodes of the TV series M*A*S*H, in 1972 and 1976. Ito acted in the 1976 film Midway as Minoru Genda, the leader of the 1942 attack on Midway Island. In 1976, he was cast as forensic lab technician Sam Fujiyama, a regular supporting role he played for seven years on Quincy, M.E. As of April 2025, Ito is the last surviving major cast member of the show.

His other film credits include The Terminal Man (1974), Rollerball (1975), Peeper (1976), Special Delivery (1976), the made-for-television film SST: Death Flight (1977), The Adventures of Buckaroo Banzai Across the 8th Dimension (1984), Pray for Death (1985), Aloha Summer (1988) and The Vineyard (1989).

Ito guest-starred on the Star Trek: The Next Generation episode "Coming of Age" as TAC officer Lt. Chang and on Star Trek: Voyager as John Kim (Harry Kim's father).

Voice roles include such programs and films as Avatar: The Last Airbender, Captain Planet and the Planeteers, Animaniacs, Bonkers, Batman: The Animated Series, Jackie Chan Adventures, Fantastic Max, Superman: The Animated Series, SWAT Kats: The Radical Squadron, My Little Pony and Friends, Where on Earth Is Carmen Sandiego?, Biker Mice from Mars, Quack Pack, Capitol Critters, ProStars, Justice League, Darkwing Duck, Chip 'n Dale Rescue Rangers, Iron Man, The Karate Kid, A Pup Named Scooby-Doo, Bill & Ted's Excellent Adventures, Rambo and the Forces of Freedom, The Amazing Chan and the Chan Clan, Savage Dragon, TaleSpin, Chuck Norris: Karate Kommandos, The Sylvester & Tweety Mysteries, All Grown Up!, The Mummy: The Animated Series, Teen Titans: Trouble in Tokyo, The New Woody Woodpecker Show, The Wild Thornberrys, Jonny Quest vs. The Cyber Insects, and Gargoyles.

== Filmography ==
=== Film ===
- 1966: Women of the Prehistoric Planet – Tango
- 1966: Dimension 5 – Saito
- 1969: Some Kind of a Nut – George Toyota
- 1973: The Naked Ape – Samurai Warrior
- 1974: The Terminal Man – Anesthetist
- 1975: Rollerball – Houston Strategy Coach
- 1976: Peeper – Butler
- 1976: Midway – Minoru Genda
- 1976: Special Delivery – Mr. Chue
- 1984: Buckaroo Banzai – Tohichi Hikita
- 1985: Pray for Death – Koga
- 1987: P.I. Private Investigations – Kim
- 1988: Aloha Summer – Ted Tanaka
- 1989: The Vineyard – Auctioneer
- 1990: Crazy People – Yamashita's Aide
- 1995: The War Between Us – Mr. Kawashima
- 1996: Hollow Point – Shin Chang
- 1999: Lima: Breaking the Silence – President Fujimoro
- 1999: The Omega Code – Shimoro Lin Chew

=== Television ===
Year	Title	Role	Notes	Ref.
1966	Get Smart	Number 3 (uncredited)	Episode: "The Amazing Harry Hoo"; uncredited	
1968	It Takes a Thief	Chief Aide	Episode: "When Good Friends Get Together"	
1970–1974	Mannix	Dr. Yoshirou, Dr. Saito, Doctor	3 episodes	
1972	M*A*S*H	Lin Chang	Episode: "To Market, to Market" (S1.E2)	
1972–1974	Kung Fu	Fong, Tim Lee, Smith	3 episodes	1975 "[Harry O] Chang Lee Episode: "Tender Killing Care" (S2.E8)
1975	The Six Million Dollar Man	Thomas Gabella	Episode: "The Last Kamikaze"	
1976	M*A*S*H	North Korean	Episode: "The Korean Surgeon" (S5.E9)	
1976–1983	Quincy, M.E.	Sam Fujiyama	148 episodes	
1976	SST: Death Flight	Roy Nakamura	Television film	
1984	Magnum P.I.	Ray Lumm	Episode: Jororo Farewell	
1986	Rambo: The Force of Freedom	Black Dragon, White Dragon (voice)	27 episodes	
1988	Star Trek: The Next Generation	Lt. Chang	Episode: "Coming of Age"	
1988–1989	Falcon Crest	Lawrence "Larry" Mishima	5 episodes	
1989	The Karate Kid	Mr. Miyagi (voice)	13 episodes	
1990	TaleSpin	Wan-Loy (voice)	Episode: "Last Horizons"	
1991	Counterstrike	Charles Hope	Episode: "Night of the Black Moon"	
1992–1993	Batman: The Animated Series	Kyodai Ken (voice)	2 episodes	
1993	Animaniacs	Mr. Kato (voice)	Episode: "Taming of the Screwy"	
1993	Highlander: The Series	Johnny Lehong	Episode: "Revenge of the Sword"	
1993	The Commish	Tashima		
1994	Gargoyles	Ken Saito (voice)	Episode: "Deadly Force"	
1994	Highlander: The Series	Hideo Koto	Episode: "The Samurai"	
1994	Trial at Fortitude Bay	Methusala	Television film Gemini Award nomination	
1995–1996	Iron Man	Mandarin (voice)	12 episodes	
1995	Jonny Quest vs. The Cyber Insects	427 (voice)	Television film	
1995	The X-Files	Dr. Shirou Samara	2 episodes	
1995	The Sylvester & Tweety Mysteries	Charlie Smith (voice)	Episode: "A Ticket to Crime"	
1996	Quack Pack	William Bill Wu (voice)	Episode: "Feats of Clay"	
1996	The Real Adventures of Jonny Quest	President Horkarno, Pradad, Controller (voice)	2 episodes	
1997	Superman: The Animated Series	Awards Presenter, Dr. Tengo (voice)	2 episodes	
1999	The King of Queens	Mr. Fujita	Episode: "Hungry Man"	
2001	The Wild Thornberrys	Asian Black Bear (voice)	Episode: "The Anniversary"	
2001	Star Trek: Voyager	John Kim	Episode: "Author, Author"	
2001	The Mummy	Lin Choux (voice)	Episode: "The Boy Who Would Be King"	
2003	Justice League	Mr. Hamsa (voice)	Episode: "Comfort and Joy"	
2006	Teen Titans: Trouble in Tokyo	Mayor, Bookseller (voice)	Television film	
2007	All Grown Up!	Hiro Watanabe (voice)	Episode: "Trading Places"	
2008	Avatar: The Last Airbender	Sun Warrior Chief (voice)	Episode: "The Firebending Masters"	
2008	Mater's Tall Tales	Ito San (voice)	Episode: "Tokyo Mater"	
