= Song of the Executioner =

Song of the Executioner may refer to:

- The Executioner's Song, a 1979 novel by Norman Mailer
- "Song of the Executioner" (Highlander), an episode of the American TV series
