= List of Highlander episodes =

List of Highlander episodes may refer to:

- List of Highlander: The Raven episodes
- List of Highlander: The Series episodes
