= Roger Bellon =

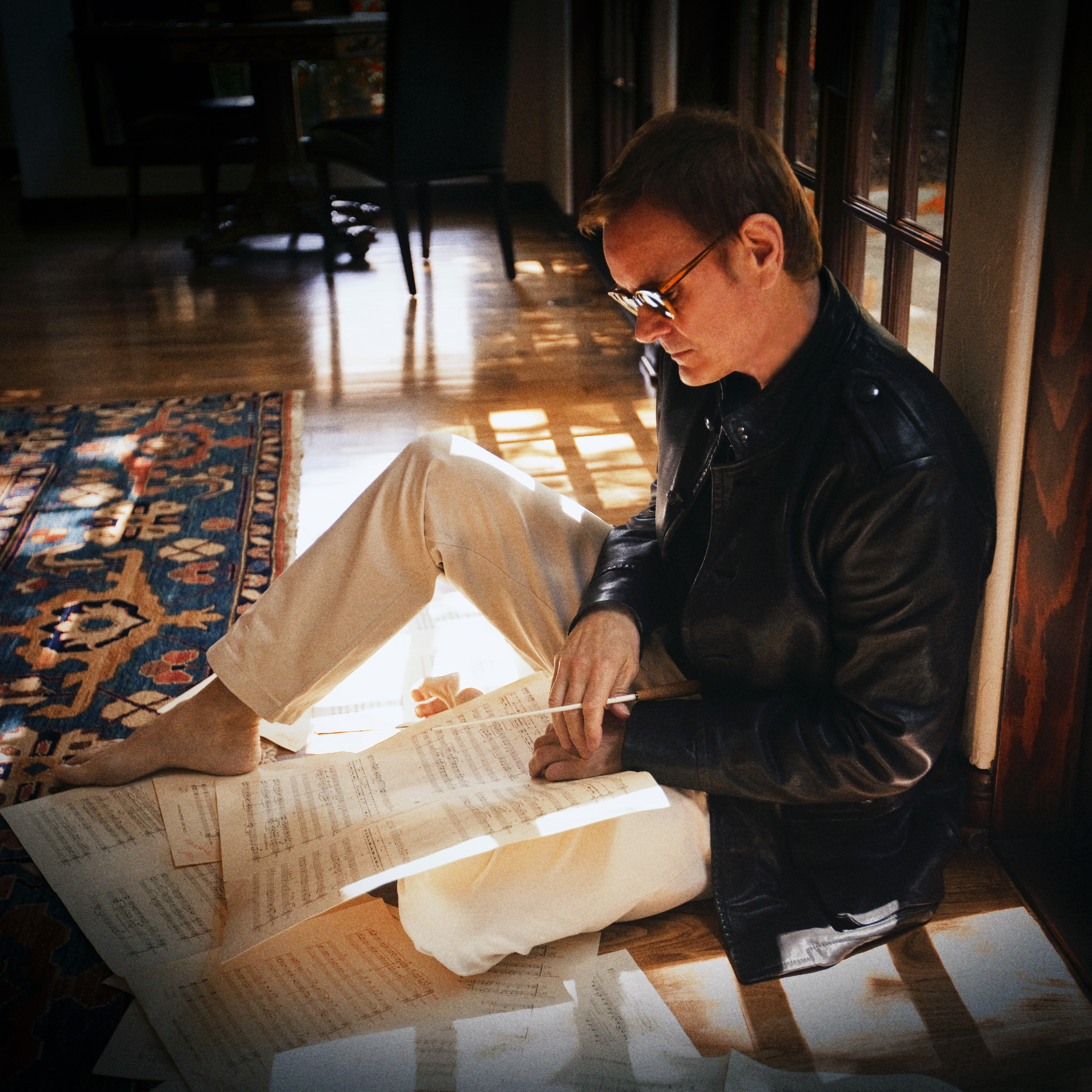

Background information
- Born: Neuilly-Sur-Seine, France
- Genres: Orchestral, electronic, film music
- Occupations: Composer, conductor, producer

Roger Bellon is a French composer, conductor, orchestrator, and producer, known for his work in film, television, theatre, and opera.

== Early life ==
He was eight when he had his first piano and composition lessons (c. 1961). Roger Bellon earned his Bachelor Of Music Composition degree from the Berklee College of Music (c. 1975), studying under music legends Gary Burton, Mike Gibbs and Herb Pomeroy among others and completed postgraduate studies in Composition and Conducting, under Pierre Petit (Grand Prix De Rome) at the École Normale de Musique de Paris, Paris.

== Career ==
He received numerous commissions from the French Government for his chamber as well as symphonic and choral compositions. At twenty-two (c. 1975), his first published composition, "Blackout," for piano, was commissioned by the École Normale de Musique de Paris for their yearly piano competition. It was published by legendary French music publisher Max Eschig and has been performed and recorded extensively. His Préludes for Piano have been performed by Gabriel Tacchino, one of France's premier post-war pianists.

RCA Records, Paris, signed Roger to their subsidiary label, Balance, where, as an artist, he produced two albums, the self-titled ROGER BELLON, a jazz-influenced record for ten pieces and ZERO ZERO, a children's Christmas album.

He began his film-scoring career in Paris, composing music for television and documentaries. He has worked with directors and writers such as Joël Santoni, Les Héroïques, and Jean Curtelin, La Marseillaise, and actors Michel Galabru, Stéphane Audran, Guy Marchand, Mort Schuman and Caroline Cellier.

Moving to Los Angeles he composed music for the popular television series Falcon Crest as well as other series such as Monsters, Yellowthread Street (including the main title), Café Americain (including the main title), The New Adventures of Robin Hood (including the main title) and the award-winning cult series, Highlander.

He has scored numerous television movies and miniseries such as the acclaimed Emmy-nominated CBS The Last Don, based on Mario Puzo's best selling book, its sequel The Last Don II, and the mini-series Frankenstein which earned him an Emmy nomination for Outstanding Achievement in Music Direction and Composition.

Bellon has scored over twenty feature films, documentaries and shorts. His most recent, 186 Dollars To Freedom, premiered at the 2011 Cannes Film Festival and garnered Best Director - Houston Worldfest and Best Film and Actor at the Hollywood Reel Film Festival. For Justice/Vengeance, actor Roy Scheider's last movie, Bellon conducted the London Symphony Orchestra at Abbey Road Studios. It won The Boston Film Festival's: Visionary Award. His other award-winning features include 12 Stones, Break A Leg, The Wishing Well, Their Eyes Were Dry, Darkness At High Noon: The Carl Foreman Documents, The Sheik (the 1921 Silent Movie), Waxwork, The Unholy, Options, Dark Horse and Hitman's Run.

A lover of theatre, Bellon has composed original music to ten theatrical productions: Open House (Shem Bitterman), A Midsummer Night's Dream (Shakespeare), Julius Caesar (Shakespeare), A Death In Columbia (Shem Bitterman), More Lies About Jerzy (Davey Holmes), Influence (Shem Bitterman), Three Sisters (Chekhov), The Taming Of The Shrew (Shakespeare), Man.Gov (Shem Bitterman) and Harms Way (Shem Bitterman).

His dance compositions include: Signé Modigliani for French Choreographer, Nadine Birtchansky, which had its World Premiere at the California Institute of the Arts, The Perfection of Anna (short film) and In Between (short film) for Choreographer Hilary Thomas and Director Elizabeth Gracen.

His opera Highlander: A Celtic Opera was co-composed with Harlan Collins. It received its radio premiere on Radio Aktywne in Poland. He is currently composing his second opera, Ilios, based on Homer's Iliad.

== Soundtracks ==
- 186 Dollars to Freedom - (Original Motion Picture Soundtrack)
- From My Flix - Songs & Themes Vol. 1
- The Last Don - (Original Motion Picture Soundtrack)
- Waxwork - (Original Motion Picture Soundtrack)
- The Unholy - (Original Motion Picture Soundtrack)
- Options - (Original Motion Picture Soundtrack)
- Highlander: The Series - (Original Series Soundtrack)
- Highlander: The Series-Volume 2 (Music And Songs From Seasons 4 & 5) - (Original Series Soundtrack)
- Mysterious Island - (Original Motion Picture Soundtrack)

== Selected works ==
- Highlander: A Celtic Opera
- Private Flight - (Compositions for Jazz flautist, Jim Walker) Produced By Clarke Stanley
- Roger Bellon (Jazz Compositions For Small Orchestra) RCA Records, Paris
- Zero, Zero (Children's Christmas Album) RCA Records, Paris
- Selected Works (Bellchant Records)
