= Anne Lindsey =

- Highlander character
- First appearance: Highlander: The Series
- Portrayed by: Lisa Howard

Anne Lindsey is a fictional character from Highlander: The Series, portrayed by actress Lisa Howard. She was introduced in the third season as a regular cast member of the series as a love interest for Duncan, substituting Tessa Noël. However, she left Duncan in the end of the season and only appeared in two more episodes in the following season.

== History ==
She was the first long-time girlfriend of Duncan MacLeod after Tessa Noël's death, and was a trauma surgeon. She saw Duncan fall to his death, making him go to Paris to avoid telling her the truth. Later, he changed his mind, told her about his immortality and she went to France to stay with him.

She got pregnant by a friend who stood by her while she was mourning Duncan's loss in Seacouver. The Highlander, however, decided to raise her child as his own kid. After seeing Duncan fight another Immortal, she decided to leave Duncan. According to her, she "saved lives" and could not live with so many deaths. She met Duncan some months later, in Seacouver, and he ended up helping Anne through labor, when they were trapped in a subway station after an explosion. She gave birth to a baby girl, whom she named after Duncan's mother, Mary. Duncan made a gift of the house he was renovating to Anne and her daughter.

== Appearances ==
Episodes - The Revolutionary, Rite of Passage, Courage, The Lamb, Obsession, Shadows, Vendetta, Blind Faith, Song of the Executioner, Take Back the Night, Testimony, Mortal Sins, Reunion, The Blitz

Books - Scotland the Brave
