= Highlander: The Series season 3 =

Highlander: The Series
- Season 3
- DVD box set
- No. of episodes: 22

Release
- Original network: Syndication
- Original release: September 26, 1994 – May 29, 1995

Season chronology
- ← Previous; Season 2 Next → Season 4

The third season of the American drama/adventure television series Highlander; the season's episodes began airing September 26, 1994 and finished on May 29, 1995. The series follows the adventures of Duncan MacLeod, a 400-year-old Immortal who can only die if he is beheaded; conflict inevitably finds him because he is part of the Game, an ongoing battle in which all Immortals have to fight and behead each other until only one is left.

== Cast ==
- Adrian Paul (Duncan MacLeod)
- Stan Kirsch (Richie Ryan)
- Philip Akin (Charlie DeSalvo) (until ep. 3)
- Lisa Howard (Anne Lindsey) (from ep. 4)
- Jim Byrnes (Joe Dawson)

=== Recurring cast ===
- Mark Acheson ... Laszlo
- Amy Adamson ... Margaret of Devon
- Patrick Albenque ... Genet
- Michael Anderson Jr. ... Ian Bancroft
- Charles Andre ... Bellam
- Stefan Arngrim ... Harry
- Terry Arrowsmith ... Haley
- Cameron Bancroft ... David Keogh
- Linden Banks ... Commander
- Margaret Barton ... Hag
- Marc Baur ... Mike / 2 episodes
- Oliver Becker ... Justin
- Paudge Behan ... Lucas Kagan
- Lloyd Berry ... Billows
- Claude Berthy ... Father Guillaume
- George Birt ... Don Salzer
- J.B. Bivens ... George
- Peter Bob ... Kahani
- Roger Bret ... Father Bernard
- Lynda Boyd ... Karen
- David Cameron ... Todd Milchan
- Robert Cavanah ... Franklin Waterman
- Carmen Champlin ... Maria Campolo
- Dolores Chaplin ... Clarise
- Randall "Tex" Cobb ... Kern
- Jennifer Copping ... Katherine
- Geraldine Cotte ... Simone Tomas
- Bill Croft ... Peter Matlin
- Bernard Cuffling ... Harry Wellfleet
- Roger Daltrey ... Hugh Fitzcairn
- Alexis Daniel ... Kristov
- Debbie Davis ... Danielle / 2 episodes
- Edgar Davis Jr. ... Joey
- Anthony De Longis ... Lymon Kurlow
- Jean Claude Deret ... Georges Dalou
- Laurent Deutsch ... Young Georges
- Bruce Dinsmore ... Robert Waverly
- Aurelio Dinunzio ... Sal
- Conrad Dunn ... Matthew
- Myles Ferguson ... Kenny
- Miguel Fernandes ... Paul Karros
- Kelly Fiddick ... Johnny
- Duncan Fraser ... Mr. Renquist
- Elodie Frenck ... Arianna
- Vicent Gale ... Lattimore
- Thierry Gary ... Iggy
- Matthew Géczy ... Martin / 2 episodes
- Selina Giles ... Tasha
- Mykhaël Georges-Schar ... Business Man
- Roland Gift ... Xavier St. Cloud
- David Gilliam ... Jeremy Clancy
- Alexa Gilmour ... Sharon Collins
- L. Harvey Gold ... Bourchek
- Demetri Goritsas ... Timon
- Tamara Gorski ... Peggy McCall
- Elizabeth Gracen ... Amanda / 4 episodes
- Jason Gray-Stanford ... Jonah
- David Gregg ... Steven
- James & Mathew Harrington ... Jeremy
- George Harris ... Vemas
- Laura Harris ... Julia Renquist
- Pierre Alexis Hollenbeck ... Rudy
- Alf Humphreys ... Frank Brody
- Robert Iseman ... Mike / 3 episodes
- Robert Ito ... Hideo Koto
- Brion James ... John Durgan
- Georges Janin ... Young Bernard
- Christina Jastrzembska ... Catherine / 2 episodes
- Willow Johnson ... Miss Welsley
- Hiro Kanagawa ... Akira Yoshida
- Olivier Kandel ... Young Kagan
- Emmanuel Karsen ... Nino / 2 episodes
- Andrew Kavadas ... Anthony Dourcef
- Eric Keenleyside ... Dallman Ross
- Georges Keyl ... Bohdan
- Liliana Komorowska ... Mara
- Kim Kondrashoff ... Henry Carter
- Bertrand Lacy ... Doctor Chandon
- Lorraine Landry ... Maureen
- Ariane Le Roux ... Neva
- Richard Leacock ... Jamal
- Marc Edouard Leon ... Paolo
- Terence Leroy-Beaulieu ... Mario
- Richard Lintern ... Tarsis
- Eugene Lipinski ... Brother Paul
- David Longworth ... Father Peter
- Catherine Lough ... Marcia / 3 episodes
- Richard Lynch ... John Kirin
- Charles Maquignon ... Gerard / 2 episodes
- Jean-Charles Maratier ... Angus
- Olivier Marchal ... Philippe
- F. Braun McAsh ... Derelict
- Stephen McHattie ... Michael Kent
- Adzine Melliti ... Rene
- Frank Messin ... Gaston
- Vince Metcalfe ... Dan Tarendash
- Anthony Miceli ... Raoul
- Gabrielle Miller ... Michelle Webster
- Sherry Miller ... Sarah Carter
- Mina E. Mina ... Kahn
- Michel Modo ... Maurice Lalonde / 4 episodes
- Jesse Moss ... Sean Zale
- John Novak ... Mason
- Jean-François Pages ... Basil Dornin / 2 episodes
- Barry Pepper ... Michael Christian
- Ken Pogue ... Simon Lang
- Rebecca Potok ... Madame Camille
- Justine Priestley ... Lisa Crane
- Ben Pullen ... Bonnie Prince Charlie
- John Pyper-Ferguson ... Brian Cullen
- Alfonso Quijada ... Carlos
- Colleen Rennison ... Robin
- David Robb ... Kalas / 5 episodes
- James Rogers ... Cory
- Tony Rosato ... Benny Carbassa
- Gerry Rousseau ... Rafe
- Pierre Rousselle ... Jean
- Karim Salah ... Sultan
- Lyes Salem ... Aram
- Gianfranco Salemi ... Doge
- Ken Samuels ... Roger
- Garwin Sanford ... Garrick
- Alan Scarfe ... Craig Webster
- Jonathan Scarfe ... Allan Kelly
- Xavier Schliwanski ... Alexei
- Peter Semler ... Callum
- Olivier Siou ... Laurent
- Nancy Sivak ... Ginny
- Nancy Sorel ... Jill Pelentay
- Stella Stevens ... Margaret Lang
- Rob Stewart ... Axel Whittaker
- Marie Stillin ... Nancy Webster
- John Suda ... Hamza El-Kahir
- Michael Sunczyk ... Syd
- John R. Taylor ... Jake
- John Tench ... Max Jupe
- Didier Terron ... Claude
- Michelle Thrush ... Little Deer
- Tamlyn Tomita ... Midori Koto
- Barbara Tyson ... Barbara Waverly
- Kim Johnston Ulrich ... Ceirdwyn
- Patrice Valota ... Marc Saracen
- Nick Vrataric ... Tim Parriot
- Lisa Vultaggio ... Elda
- Sian Webber ... Christine Salzer / 2 episodes
- Chandra West ... Donna
- Andrew Wheeler ... Father Mathew
- Peter Wingfield ... Methos / 3 episodes
- Frederic Witta ... Patrick
- Andrew Woodall ... Ernst Daimler
- Mary Woronov ... Rita Luce
- Vivian Wu ... May-Ling Shen
- Jonathan Zaccai ... Louis
- Valerie Zarrouk ... Naomi

== Episodes ==
No. overall	No. in season	Title	Directed by	Written by	Original release date	Prod. code
45	1	"The Samurai"	Dennis Berry	Naomi Janzen	September 26, 1994	94301
After Midori Koto sees her husband, rich industrialist Michael Kent, murder her lover, she kills Kent and runs to Duncan for protection. She reminds Duncan of a vow of protection his "ancestor" (actually Duncan himself) made to her family over 200 years before. Flashbacks tell the story of Duncan coming to the aid of the samurai Hideo Koto after Duncan is shipwrecked in Japan. Hideo befriends Duncan – even though the penalty for helping a "barbarian" in isolationist Japan is death. When Hideo is forced to commit seppuku (ritual suicide) by his feudal overlord for that crime, Duncan serves as his second. He vows to Hideo he will always protect the Koto family and is bequeathed the dragon head katana sword he uses to this day. Back in the present, Duncan discovers that Kent is an Immortal and he's still alive. In order not to further dishonor her family's name, Midori returns to Kent. Kent challenges Duncan, who fulfills his vow to the Koto family and frees Midori from her loveless marriage.
46	2	"Line of Fire"	Clay Borris	David Tynan	October 3, 1994	94302
Donna, a girl Richie dated briefly several years ago, returns with her 18-month-old son – who she claims is Richie's! While Duncan reminds him that it's impossible, as Immortals are unable to have children, Richie sees this as an opportunity to have the family he never had, and never will be able to again. When Kern, an evil Immortal, rides into town, Duncan is reminded of his own foster son, Kahani. Kahani and his Sioux Indian mother, Little Deer, were massacred over a hundred years ago by U.S. soldiers led by Kern, then a mercenary scout. Duncan is eager to even the score. When Donna finds Richie's rapier and demands to know what it's for, Richie is at a loss to tell her. Duncan advises Richie that it would be safer and kinder to Donna and the baby to leave them. When his new-found family is threatened by Kern, Richie realizes Duncan is right. While Duncan rids the world of the evil Kern, Richie lets go of the only family he'll ever have.
47	3	"The Revolutionary"	Dennis Berry	Peter Mohan	October 10, 1994	94303
The people of a tiny Balkan nation are rising up in arms against an oppressive dictator. The freedom fighters are led by Paul Karros, a vibrant, charismatic leader. Karros is an Immortal who once served as a slave under Roman oppression and fought his way to freedom with Spartacus. Since that time, whenever the common people have been fighting against oppression, Karros has been at their side. Karros and his assistant, Mara, have come to the U.S. to drum up support for their cause. Duncan and Karros fought together in the Mexican Revolution and Karros tries to convince Duncan to fight with him in this just cause. Duncan turns him down, but Charlie is tempted both by the cause and by Mara. When Father Stefan, a local liaison, is critically wounded in an assassination attempt, Duncan realizes that Karros is determined to fight the war at any cost – even at the cost of sabotaging peace negotiations by killing those who trust him. When Mara discovers the truth, she threatens to expose him. Karros responds by attempting to kill her. Duncan is forced to challenge and behead his old comrade. When Mara returns home to the Balkans, Charlie goes with her to help the people rebuild.
48	4	"The Cross of St. Antoine"	Dennis Berry	Morrie Ruvinsky	October 17, 1994	94304
Joe has a new girlfriend, art historian Lauren Gale, and a new attitude on life. Unfortunately, Joe arrives at Lauren's house one evening to witness her murder. We discover the murderer is Armand Thorne, benefactor of the Thorne Museum of Antiquities, who was being investigated by Lauren. Duncan finds an ancient gold cross on display in Thorne's museum, a cross that had been stolen out from under his protection nearly two hundred years before. Armand Thorne, Duncan discovers, is actually John Durgan, the Immortal trapper who murdered a frontier priest and stole the cross. Duncan persuades Amanda to come out of cat-burglar retirement and help him to steal the cross from the museum in order to lure Thorne out of his heavily protected fortress. Unfortunately, Durgan anticipates it and captures Joe, promising to release him in exchange for the cross. Using Amanda as a distraction for Durgan’s senses, Duncan tricks Durgan into leaving Holy Ground with the cross. Duncan fights Durgan, taking his head, and finally gets to fulfill his promise in returning the Cross of St. Antoine.
49	5	"Rite of Passage"	Mario Azzopardi	Karen Harris	October 24, 1994	94305
Michelle Webster, the rebellious 18-year-old adoptive daughter of a friend of Duncan's, drives away from her parents' house in a rage and right over a cliff. Trauma surgeon Anne Lindsey tries her best to save Michelle, but it's too late. Duncan rushes to the hospital to comfort his grieving friends – and sneak their newly Immortal daughter out of the morgue. He tries to train her in the arts of Immortality, but Michelle just wants to have fun. She meets Immortal Axel Whittaker who promises her all the fun and adventure she could imagine if she stays with him. In flashback, we see that Whittaker uses beautiful new Immortal women as bait to trap other Immortals and take their heads – Duncan barely escaped with his in 1896 Boston. Whittaker uses Michelle to lure Duncan to his yacht, where they continue the battle they started a hundred years before. Duncan defeats Whittaker. Michelle, witnessing the fearsome power of the Quickening, agrees to be trained as an Immortal under the protection of Amanda.
50	6	"Courage"	Charles Wilkinson	Nancy Heiken	October 31, 1994	94306
Brian Cullen, an old friend of Duncan's, is burnt out from centuries of playing The Game and has turned to drugs and alcohol to get the courage to keep on playing. Cullen had a run-in with Richie and now he's coming for Richie's head. While playing "chicken" with Richie on a mountain road, Cullen crashes head-on into a bus full of passengers, killing many. Duncan tries to convince Cullen, who he once knew as the greatest of the warriors, to stop using the drugs, but a paranoid Cullen believes Duncan is just trying to render him helpless. Finally, Duncan has no choice but to confront his former comrade and defeat him.
51	7	"The Lamb"	Dennis Berry	J. P. Couture	November 7, 1994	94307
What happens to a kid who hits Immortality before he hits puberty? Duncan and Richie take in 10-year-old Kenny, who asks for their protection after the fatherly Immortal who was protecting him is beheaded. Kenny, we discover, is not the sweet little lamb he appears to be. He has been Immortal for nearly 800 years, and has survived all that time by convincing other Immortals to take him in and protect him – and then taking their heads. One of them, Dallman Ross, is now after Kenny. Kenny tries to get Duncan, but he is continuously thwarted by the presence of Anne. Eventually, Duncan engages Ross and defeats him. Ross explains Kenny killed his mortal wife after they took him in. Duncan spares him, but Kenny finishes him off. Kenny attempts to get Anne out of his way, but Duncan, realizing the truth about Kenny, manages to rescue her. He goes after Kenny to stop him from killing again, but Kenny manages to escape by blending in with a group of innocent children.
52	8	"Obsession"	Charles Wilkinson	Lawrence Shore	November 14, 1994	94308
Immortal David Keogh, once an indentured servant, is a noted craftsman with his heart set on marrying his sweetheart, Jill. Unfortunately, Jill does not agree. Although she loved Keogh once, she was unable to handle it when he confided the secret of his Immortality. Now Keogh won't leave her alone and she's coming to Duncan, whom Keogh respects and might listen to, for help. But Keogh won't listen, convinced that Jill needs him as much as he needs her. In flashback, we see a time in Duncan's life when he, too, was obsessed with a woman he couldn't have. When Jill is killed in a tragic accident while trying to get way from Keogh, Keogh blames Duncan and gets him to fight. Duncan wins, but refrains from beheading him. Keogh swears vengeance, but Duncan calls his bluff and storms away, leaving him alive.
53	9	"Shadows"	Charles Wilkinson	David Tynan	November 21, 1994	94309
Duncan is tormented by visions of his own death, beheaded by a mysterious dark-hooded figure. Anne tries to convince him to seek medical help, but instead he turns to his old friend, Immortal John Garrick, who has spent centuries studying the mind. Duncan saw Garrick in the 17th century, when Duncan barely escaped being burned as a witch. What Duncan didn't know was that Garrick was not able to escape as well. Garrick convinces Duncan that the dark-hooded figure is a racial memory that haunts all Immortals and that the way to defeat it is to not fight it, to accept it for what it is. When Duncan, haggard and exhausted, faces the specter for the last time, puts down his sword and refuses to fight it, the figure goes for Duncan's head – until at the last moment Duncan realizes the figure is Garrick, seeking his revenge after all these years. He breaks into Duncan's flat, forcing him to defend himself and behead him. In the Tag, Anne, frustrated that Duncan won't open up to her despite their intimate relationship, leaves him.
54	10	"Blackmail"	Paolo Barzman	Morrie Ruvinsky	November 28, 1994	94310
Lawyer Robert Waverly is leaving his mistress' apartment with his video camera when he sees Duncan locked in combat with an evil Immortal, Peter Matlin. Waverly gets it all on tape – the fight, the beheading, the Quickening. He later tries to cut a deal with Duncan: if Duncan kills Waverly's wife, then Duncan won't go to the police. When Immortal Lymon Kurlow, Matlin's partner, comes after Duncan, Waverly, unaware of what he's dealing with, proposes another deal. A la "Strangers on a Train," Waverly will kill Kurlow and Duncan will kill his wife, and no one will suspect a thing. Waverly challenges Kurlow, who kills Waverly easily and Duncan is left to save Waverly's wife and get rid of Kurlow.
55	11	"Vendetta"	George Mendeluk	Alan Swayze	December 5, 1994	94311
To save his own hide, petty hoodlum Benny Carbassa turns Duncan over to an aging gangster determined to see Duncan dead before he dies. In the midst of this, Anne returns, having convinced herself that Duncan will open up in his own time and determined not to push him too hard. In flashback, we see Duncan's first meeting with Benny, in 1938 at the Coconut Lounge, a club operated by two young brothers who are rivals for the same torch singer.
56	12	"They Also Serve"	Paolo Barzman	Lawrence Shore	February 6, 1995	94312
Recent Immortal Michael Christian has been on an incredible string of luck, taking a number of heads from unarmed and vulnerable opponents, including May-Ling Shen, who taught Duncan the martial arts in 1780s Mongolia. Christian's Watcher, Rita Luce, has been doing more than just watching, supplying Christian with classified information on the other Immortals and their weaknesses. Duncan, unaware of Christian, goes on a vision quest to his cabin on Holy Ground – deliberately leaving his sword behind. Learning of this, Luce sends Christian after Duncan, but Joe also dispatches Richie. Christian attacks the unarmed Duncan but was outsmarted and beheaded. Luce leaves the Watchers.
57	13	"Blind Faith"	Jerry Ciccoritti	Jim Makichuk	February 13, 1995	94313
When a religious leader, John Kirin, dies on Anne's operating table and then returns from the dead, his believers know a miracle has occurred. Duncan knows better. He watched as Kirin, then known as Kage, massacred POWs in the Spanish Civil War and left a band of Cambodian refugee children to die at the hands of the Khmer Rouge. Kirin swears that experience changed him forever, turning him from a man of war to a man of peace. When a tabloid reporter trying to get the goods on Kirin winds up dead in Duncan's dojo, Duncan is certain Kirin is responsible. Kirin protests his innocence and realizes the real killer is Matthew, one of his faithful disciples trying to protect him. Kirin confronts a disillusioned Matthew, who manages to kill Kirin before dying himself in a rain of police bullets. In the Tag, Kirin and Duncan have made peace as Kirin takes to the road, hoping to do good elsewhere.
58	14	"Song of the Executioner"	Paolo Barzman	David Tynan	February 20, 1995	94314
In the 17th century, Duncan sought refuge for a time in a monastery founded by Paul, another Immortal. There he encountered Antonio Neri, best known as Kalas, an Immortal monk with a heavenly singing voice. When Duncan discovered that Kalas was routinely taking the heads of Immortals as they left the sanctuary, Duncan and Paul expelled Kalas from the monastery, separating him from the music that was his life. Now in the present, Paul and his choir have been lured out of their monastery for a concert tour. When Paul disappears after a concert, Duncan discovers that Kalas is after his revenge. Meanwhile, two mysterious deaths at the hospital seem to be linked to negligence on Anne's part. Later, when drugs are found in Joe's bar, it becomes obvious that Kalas is trying to destroy Duncan's friends before coming for him. Duncan confronts Kalas and finds that Kalas is a strong and skillful fighter, better than Duncan has faced before, and is nearly the victor. To save himself, Duncan throws himself off the concert hall catwalk, landing, dead, near Anne on the seats below. Kalas escapes and Duncan is forced to leave his life in the U.S. and flee to France, leaving Anne believing that he is dead.
59	15	"Star-Crossed"	Paolo Barzman	Jim Makichuk	February 27, 1995	94315
Duncan is picked up at the airport in France by his best friend, Hugh Fitzcairn. For the first time in the 350 years Duncan has known him, Fitz has settled down as a Professor to the École de Cuisine et de Pâtisserie Le Cordon Bleu, with the love of his life, Naomi. Flashbacks show Duncan and Fitz's first meeting, when Duncan was protecting the Doge's daughter from Fitz's amorous advances in Verona, 1637. When Naomi's jealous ex-lover is found strangled next to a computer displaying Fitz's falsified teaching credentials, Fitz goes on the run from the police. Duncan realizes that Fitz is being framed by Kalas, who has followed him from the U.S. Kalas challenges Fitz and takes his head while Duncan watches, unable to interfere.
60	16	"Methos"	Dennis Berry	J. P. Couture	March 6, 1995	94316
When two Watchers end up dead by Kalas' hand, Joe realizes that Kalas is looking for Methos, the mythical "oldest Immortal." Duncan knows that, with Methos' Quickening, Kalas would finally be strong enough to defeat him. Kalas and Duncan race to be the first to find Methos. Meanwhile, Richie muscles his way onto a top level motorcycle racing team and the champion, Basil, starts to get nervous. Flashbacks are to Paris in the 1920s, when Kalas, then known as Antonio Neri, was the toast of the opera world. When Kalas threatens a young girl in Duncan's protection, they fight. Kalas escapes, but not before Duncan inflicts a throat wound that destroys Kalas' vocal cords and the singing that has been his life since the Middle Ages. Kalas nearly takes Methos in battle, so Methos, realizing that he will not be able to defeat Kalas, offers his own head to Duncan. Duncan refuses and challenges Kalas on his own, nearly defeating him before the police arrive to arrest Kalas for the deaths of the Watchers.
61	17	"Take Back the Night"	Paolo Barzman	Alan Swayze	April 24, 1995	94317
When Immortal Ceirdwyn and her mortal husband are gunned down by a street gang, she calls upon her skills as an ancient Celtic warrior to exact her revenge on the members of the gang, one by one. At the racetrack watching Richie's success at racing, Duncan befriends a young pickpocket, Paolo, the brother of one of the gang members, and learns of the killings. Duncan, who has known Ceirdwyn/Flora MacDonald since before they helped smuggle Bonnie Prince Charlie out of Scotland in 1746, feels he must stop Ceirdwyn and make her see that revenge is not the answer – a lesson she helped Duncan learn in the bloody aftermath of Culloden. In return, Ceirdwyn helps Duncan see that, although loving a mortal can be dangerous for the mortal, it is the mortal who must choose whether to take the risk. Duncan calls Anne. Meanwhile, Richie "dies" in a fiery crash during a race, a crash that also takes the life of the champion, Basil.
62	18	"Testimony"	Dennis Berry	David Tynan	May 1, 1995	94318
Duncan decides to tell Anne the truth about his Immortality and she flies to Paris to be with him. En route, Anne helps save the life of a young woman, Tasha, who turns out to be smuggling drugs for the Russian Mafia. Tasha is the lover of Kristov, the head of the Russian gang and formerly the leader of the band of Cossacks MacLeod encountered on his way to the Orient in 1750. Concerned about Tasha, Anne tries to convince her to testify against Kristov, while Kristov is determined to make sure Tasha dies before she can testify. Richie is kidnapped by Kristov as a pawn in this game. MacLeod must choose between taking down Kristov or saving Richie. Luckily, Richie freed himself and beheaded Kristov. Departing Paris, Richie finds he must grow as an Immortal – or die.
63	19	"Mortal Sins"	Mario Azzopardi	Lawrence Shore	May 8, 1995	94319
Father Bernard has a secret he thought he'd buried 50 years ago at the bottom of the Seine. When Ernest Daimler, the Nazi Major who Bernard killed as a young boy and threw in the river just as he came back to life, appears at his church looking not a day older than the day he died, Father Bernard realizes he's like Duncan. As a child, Bernard watched Duncan die and revive during a mission for the French Resistance and Duncan swore him to secrecy. Bernard goes to Duncan for help. Meanwhile, Anne tells Duncan that she is pregnant – by an old friend she sought for comfort after Duncan's "death." Duncan tries to adjust to the concept of being a father. When Daimler kills Father Bernard and comes after Anne, Duncan beheads Daimler and Anne witnesses what being part of Duncan's life really means. Unable to deal with the part of herself that wanted to see Daimler die, Anne leaves Duncan.
64	20	"Reasonable Doubt"	Dennis Berry	Elizabeth Baxter	May 15, 1995	94320
When a valuable DaVinci sketch is stolen from a friend of Duncan's in a robbery that killed two guards, Duncan offers to act as go-between to ransom it back. He discovers the sketch was stolen by Lucas Kagan, an Immortal he faced once before, when Kagan was a bank robber in 1930 Paris and MacLeod killed his mentor. Meanwhile, Maurice asks Duncan to talk to his troubled niece, Simone. Simone turns out to be more troubled than Maurice knows – she's a prostitute and Kagan's accomplice. Duncan goes after Kagan, who protests his innocence in the deaths of the guards and who promises Duncan that he'll change his ways if Duncan will help him. When Simone, the only one who knows Kagan is the killer, is killed, Duncan realizes that Kagan could never really change and confronts Kagan, taking his head.
65	21	"Finale, Part 1"	Mario Azzopardi	David Tynan	May 22, 1995	94321
Amanda accidentally helps Kalas escape from prison by trying to do Duncan a favor and kill Kalas for him. After an attempt on Maurice's life thwarted by Duncan, Kalas kidnaps Amanda to use as bait against Duncan, but Amanda manages to escape. Meanwhile, Christine Salzer, the widow of a Watcher killed by Kalas (in "Methos") decides to get her revenge on Immortals and Watchers alike by exposing their secret to the media. Joe and Methos team up to try and talk Salzer out of it, but she's determined to take a computer disk with the identities of all known Immortals and Watchers on it to a newspaper publisher. Joe, desperate, tries to kill her outside the newspaper building, but is stopped by Duncan and Methos. Salzer enters the building and the Immortals and the Watchers know their lives are about to change forever.
66	22	"Finale, Part 2"	Dennis Berry	David Tynan	May 29, 1995	94322
As Salzer tells her tale to the newspaper publisher, Duncan and Amanda, knowing their world is about to end, finally admit they love each other. Kalas kills Salzer and the publisher and steals the computer disk before they have a chance to spread the story. Kalas offers Duncan a deal – Duncan offers up his head or the contents of the disk are made public. Joe and the Watchers attempt to find Kalas, but this only results in more dead Watchers. Methos tries to talk Duncan out of it, but Duncan agrees to fight Kalas on top of the Eiffel Tower. Kalas is defeated and the resulting Quickening, amplified by the Tower, sends a power surge that disrupts every computer in the vicinity – including Kalas'. The information on the disk is destroyed and Immortals and Watchers maintain their anonymity.

== Home media ==
Highlander: The Series Season Three
Set details		Special features
22 episodes; 9-disc set (8 DVDs and 1 CD-ROM); 1.33:1 aspect ratio; English (Dolby Digital 5.1); English (Dolby Digital 2.0 Stereo)		A vast library of never before seen footage including deleted, alternate and recently discovered scenes; Watcher Chronicles - Discover the lives of the Immortals and those they encountered as recorded by the Watchers; Interviews with the Actors, Producers, Editors, Writers, Set and Costume Designers; Photo Gallery; Audio Commentaries from: Adrian Paul, Stan Kirsch, Gillian Horvath, Anthony Delongis, Elizabeth Gracen and more; Series Promos; Blooper Reel; CD-ROM: All 22 scripts, Actor, Director & Writer Bios & Series Trivia
Release dates
Region 1	Region 2	
November 18, 2003		
