= Harlan Collins =

American composer

Paul Harlan Collins, more often known as Harlan Collins, is a composer, arranger, musician, and writer. His daily feature, "Today's Chuckle", which was started by his father Tom in 1948, is the most widely syndicated front-page feature in the world.

He became one of the first pop artists signed to Beatles manager Brian Epstein's cutting-edge label, Nemperor Records. He has composed and arranged music for Sesame Street, Robin Hood, Highlander, Fighting Words, One Tough Cop and the cult classic This Is Spinal Tap, and wrote "Wrap Me in Your Arms" for Olivia Newton-John, a song included on her 1976 Come On Over. He was a musical guest during the first season of Saturday Night Live. More recently he and Roger Bellon wrote Highlander – A Celtic Opera. He is the author/composer of half a dozen other musicals, as well.

In addition to these activities, Collins has worked extensively in language localization (subtitling and dubbing) and content creation for the entertainment business, serving as VP at Global Media Transfer, Media Concepts, VITAC Corporation, The Movie Treasury, Shadowbox Interactive and Hot Hits and as Creative Director for VoxWorks Technologies, SDI and Western Bell Communications.

Collins attended New York University, majoring in film and drama.

Collins is the author of Today's Chuckle: 2500 Great One-Liners for Every Occasion (ISBN 0-399-51810-X), a 1993 paperback collecting many one-liners from the column started by his father.

Collins is divorced and has a daughter, Molly who was born in 1989.
