= Highlander: The Series =

Television series

- Genre: Action-adventure; Science fantasy
- Created by: Davis-Panzer Productions
- Based on: Characters by Gregory Widen
- Starring: Adrian Paul; Alexandra Vandernoot; Stan Kirsch; Amanda Wyss; Jim Byrnes; Philip Akin; Michel Modo; Lisa Howard; Elizabeth Gracen; Peter Wingfield
- Theme music composer: Freddie Mercury
- Opening theme: "Princes of the Universe" performed by Queen
- Ending theme: "Princes of the Universe (Instrumental)" performed by Queen
- Composer: Roger Bellon
- Countries of origin: Canada; France
- Original languages: English; French
- No. of seasons: 6
- No. of episodes: 119 (List of episodes)

Production
- Executive producers: Christian Charret; Marla Ginsburg; Peter S. Davis; William Panzer; Steven Maier; Sheryl Hardy; Guy Collins; Marc du Pontavice
- Producer: Ken Gord
- Production locations: Vancouver; Paris
- Running time: 48 minutes
- Production companies: Rysher Entertainment; Gaumont Television; Atlantique Productions; Reteitalia; RTL Plus; Amuse Video

Original release
- Network: United States: Syndicated; France: TF1, later M6; Italy: Italia 1, later Canale 5; Germany: RTL
- Release: October 3, 1992 – May 16, 1998

Related
- Highlander: The Raven; Highlander: Endgame; Highlander: The Source

Highlander: The Series is a science fantasy action-adventure television series featuring Duncan MacLeod (Adrian Paul) of the Scottish Clan MacLeod, as the eponymous "Highlander". It was co-produced by Rysher Distribution in the United States, Gaumont Television in France, Reteitalia in Italy, RTL Plus in Germany, and Amuse Video in Japan. An alternative sequel to the 1986 feature film Highlander, it features a storyline in which the protagonist of that film (Connor MacLeod, a member of a race of "Immortals") has not won "the Prize" sought by all Immortals, who still exist post-1985. Christopher Lambert reprised his role as Connor in the pilot episode, which introduced series protagonist Duncan MacLeod, an Immortal who was born in the same clan of Scottish Highlanders who had found and raised Connor generations before.

The series was an international hit and was nominated twice for the Motion Picture Sound Editors' Golden Reel Award (Foley Artist ("The Gathering"): 1992; Foley Artist ("The Darkness"): 1993), three times for the Gemini Award (Best Dramatic Series: 1996; Best Performance by an Actor in a Guest Role in a Dramatic Series: 1997 (John Pyper-Ferguson), 1996 (Bruce A. Young)), once for a Saturn Award (Best Genre Syndicated TV Series: 1997), and eight times for the Online Film & Television Association Award (Best Guest Actress in a Syndicated Series (Sandra Bernhard), Best Direction in a Syndicated Series, Best Writing in a Syndicated Series, Best Syndicated Series, Best Ensemble in a Syndicated Series: 1997; Best Actor in a Syndicated Series (Peter Wingfield), Best Syndicated Series, Best Ensemble in a Syndicated Series: 1998).

== Series overview ==
Season	Episodes	Originally released	
Season	Episodes	First released	Last released
1	22	October 3, 1992	May 22, 1993
2	22	September 27, 1993	May 23, 1994
3	22	September 26, 1994	May 29, 1995
4	22	September 25, 1995	May 26, 1996
5	18	September 23, 1996	May 19, 1997
6	13	October 5, 1997	May 16, 1998

=== History ===
The pilot episode established the main character, Duncan MacLeod, and his girlfriend Tessa Noël (played by Alexandra Vandernoot), initially living quietly together as co-proprietors of the antique shop MacLeod & Noël Antiques. Richie Ryan (Stan Kirsch) was introduced as a thief breaking into their shop and witnessing the confrontation between Duncan, the evil Immortal Slan Quince (Richard Moll), and Duncan's fellow clansman Connor MacLeod, the central protagonist of the original Highlander movie franchise.

Also revealed was that Duncan had lived nearly 400 years, and was one of many such Immortals in the world. Connor had come to ask Duncan to return to the Game, to fight on the side of good against evil. "The Game" was the term used by the Immortals to describe their hunting of one another, seeking "Quickenings" by beheading their opponents. Duncan had been hiding from other Immortals for some time, removing himself from the Game. Now hunted by Quince, he had to face him, and by the end of the first episode, Slan was defeated and Duncan was clearly caught up in The Game again.

Storylines revolved around Duncan MacLeod and his relationships with mortals and other Immortals. Relationships formed a theme in the series, especially Duncan MacLeod's relationships with his friends, family, lovers, and foes. As the series progressed, changes in concept become apparent, as well as normal growth in the characters and their relationships. Recurring Immortal characters such as Amanda and Methos made guest appearances in season one, and the Watchers, including Joe Dawson, were introduced in season two.

In the final episode of season 5, "Archangel", the character of Richie Ryan was killed off and the supernatural demon Ahriman introduced into the storyline. Of the 13 episodes of season six, two did not feature MacLeod, while in some he appeared in cameos: the producers were experimenting with introducing a new female Immortal character for a spin-off series. None of the introduced characters were chosen, and what came to be Highlander: The Raven featured the recurring character Amanda in a starring role. The spin-off series lasted for one season, consisting of 22 episodes.

=== Cast and characters ===
Actor	Character	Seasons					
Actor	Character	1	2	3	4	5	6
Adrian Paul	Duncan MacLeod	Main	Main	Main	Main	Main	Main
Alexandra Vandernoot	Tessa Noël	Main (Note: Vandernoot is only credited until the fourth episode of season two, and returns as a different character for the final two episodes, credited as guest star.)	Main		Guest		Guest
Stan Kirsch	Richie Ryan	Main	Main	Main	Main	Main	Special Guest
Amanda Wyss	Randi McFarland	Main (Note: Wyss is only credited in the episodes in which she appears, and unlike the rest of the main cast, her face is not shown in the opening credits.)					
Jim Byrnes	Joe Dawson		Main	Main	Main	Main	Main
Philip Akin	Charlie DeSalvo		Main (Note: Akin is credited as a regular on episodes 3-15 of Season Two and episodes 1-3 of Season Three.)	Main	Guest		
Michel Modo	Maurice Lalonde		Main (Note: Modo appears as a guest star in episode 15, is billed as main cast for episodes 16-22, only appearing in episodes 17-20.)	Recurring		Guest	
Lisa Howard	Anne Lindsay			Main (Note: Howard appears as a special guest star in episode 3, and is billed as main cast from episode 4 onwards.)	Guest		
Elizabeth Gracen	Amanda Darieux	Guest	Guest	Recurring	Recurring	Recurring	Main (Note: Despite being credited as main cast for every episode of season six, Gracen only appears in episodes 12-13.)
Peter Wingfield	Methos			Recurring	Recurring	Recurring	Main (Note: Despite being credited as main cast for every episode of season six, Wingfield only appears in episodes 11-13.)

=== Narration ===
Each episode began with an opening montage of scenes from Duncan's life, over which was a narration giving a brief overview of the series' theme. The first six episodes of the first season were narrated by Duncan himself:

I am Duncan MacLeod, born four hundred years ago in the Highlands of Scotland. I am Immortal and I am not alone. For centuries we have waited for the time of the Gathering, when the stroke of a sword and the fall of a head will release the power of the Quickening. In the end, there can be only one.

This narration was slightly changed in the show's seventh episode, "Mountain Men" (again by Duncan):

I was born four hundred years ago in the Highlands of Scotland. I am immortal and I am not alone. Now is the time of the Gathering, when the stroke of a sword will release the power of the Quickening. In the end, there can be only one.

The narration changed again in the second season, when Watcher Joe Dawson was introduced (narrative by Joe):

He is immortal. Born in the Highlands of Scotland four hundred years ago, he is not alone. There are others like him – some good, some evil. For centuries, he has battled the forces of darkness, with Holy Ground his only refuge. He cannot die, unless you take his head, and with it, his power. In the end, there can be only one. He is Duncan MacLeod, the Highlander.

In the fourth season it was changed, and remained until the end of the series' run (narrative by Joe):

He is Duncan MacLeod, the Highlander. Born in 1592 in the Highlands of Scotland, and he is still alive. He is immortal. For four hundred years, he's been a warrior ... a lover ... a wanderer, constantly facing other Immortals in combat to the death. The winner takes his enemy's head, and with it, his power. I am a Watcher, part of a secret society of men and women who observe and record, but never interfere. We know the truth about Immortals. In the end, there can be only one. May it be Duncan MacLeod, the Highlander.

=== Season 1 (1992–93) ===
Duncan MacLeod and Tessa Noel have been living in the city of Seacouver in the Pacific North West for several years, where they run an antiques store. One night, a young street punk called Richie Ryan breaks into the shop whilst they are celebrating Tessa's birthday but is caught by MacLeod, who threatens to cut off his head with a sword. Stunned by MacLeod's seeming over-reaction, Richie watches as another man jumps in through the skylight and challenges the antiques dealer, only to be disconcerted by the appearance of a third man with a Japanese sword, who is in turn hunting him. The intruder is Slan Quince, who is hunting Duncan, unaware that he is himself the target of Duncan's kinsman, Connor MacLeod. Intrigued, the kid follows the MacLeods, only to see first Connor, then Duncan, fight Slan. He sees Connor defeated but escape, leaving Duncan to behead Quince. Amazed, he watches Duncan caught at the center of lightning and explosions as he witnesses, for the first time, a Quickening. Before he leaves, Connor tells Duncan that he must watch Richie, which Duncan does by taking in the boy, who has no family, and employing him in the antiques store. MacLeod also tells Richie the truth about himself and the others – that he is 400 years old and he, like them, is Immortal ("The Gathering"). As the series progressed, MacLeod encountered Immortals like Howard Crowley whom he killed in revenge for killing an Immortal friend of his and framing an innocent man for it ("Innocent Man"), Kiem Sun ("Road Not Taken") and taking in an Immortal student Felice Martin (Free Fall). He even saves Tessa from Immortals like survivalist Caleb Cole (for the only time in the series, Tessa sees Duncan caught in the power of a Quickening) ("Mountain Men") and Andrew Ballin, who wanted to kill her after she witnessed him killing his former lover ("Eyewitness"). Alexei Voshin, with whom he has an old score to settle ("The Sea Witch"), and Walter Reinhardt, another Immortal he had crossed paths with before ("Revenge Is Sweet").

The idyllic life of Duncan and Tessa is shattered by the arrival of a message from one of Mac's teachers, the priest Darius. Darius' most powerful enemy, Grayson, was coming to Seacouver, to eliminate a mortal peacemaker and disciple of Darius, Victor Paulus. Grayson was a lieutenant of Darius when they led an army across Europe in the 5th century but turned against him when Darius killed the then-oldest living Immortal at the gates of Paris and became a man of peace. Determined to protect Tessa and Richie but uncertain of his ability to handle Grayson, he sends them to Darius for protection, then sets out to face Grayson. Grayson offers MacLeod a position at his right hand but is refused. Grayson takes MacLeod to the limit before the Highlander prevails. MacLeod follows his friends to Paris, where he and Tessa decide to stay, living on Duncan's barge. Tessa takes up a post as a curator; Duncan takes up the role of a kept man and Richie that of a fish out of water ("Band of Brothers").

Duncan does the shopping, but as he is returning to the barge one morning, he sees a man dressed as a mime kill an elderly man ("For Evil's Sake"). Helping the police, he tells them that he can identify the man. The police inspector, LeBrun, is convinced he has seen Duncan before. Later, mysterious men with guns stake out the barge and, when Duncan fells one, he finds that he is a policeman. LeBrun has remembered Duncan – when he was a young gendarme, they were chasing the assassin Kuyler and he saw Duncan then. LeBrun's assistant is in Kuyler's pay, but Duncan silences the mime forever and LeBrun arrests his assistant. Duncan hasn't finished with LeBrun, for when his old enemy Xavier St Cloud crosses his path again, Duncan throws one of Xavier's gas grenades into a cement mixer and LeBrun fishes it out ("For Tomorrow We Die"). Convinced MacLeod is the gas poisoner, LeBrun tries to run him in whilst Duncan has to stop Xavier from gassing an exhibition Tessa is organizing. Frustrated, Xavier comes for Duncan, but Duncan cuts off Xavier's hand and he disappears into the Seine. The series also introduced two old Immortal lovers of Duncan's to test Tessa's restraint. Grace Chandel, on the run both from the police, who want to arrest her for killing her mortal husband, and the Immortal ex-lover who was the real killer, the possessive Carlo Sendaro ("Saving Grace") was welcomed by Tessa, when Duncan and Darius help her escape, Duncan making sure that Carlo will not trouble her again. The same was not true of Amanda, described by Duncan as "a bad habit". In "The Lady and The Tiger" we met the unprincipled cat-burglar with a passion for circuses, robbery, and 400-year-old Scotsmen, here trying to set up MacLeod so that the Immortal thief she had double-crossed, Zachary Blaine, would not take her head. In the end, she takes Zachary's, but not before Duncan has done all the hard work. Which pretty much set the pattern for all of the Amanda stories to come.

In the season finale, Duncan's old friend, Hugh Fitzcairn, comes to see him, with news that Immortals are disappearing. When they go to see Darius, they find him decapitated inside the church. Returning to Fitz's hotel, they are attacked and Fitz is spirited away, whilst Duncan returns to the church, finding a mysterious book hidden by Darius. It is a history of Immortals written by a secret society of mortals. When these mortals come for Duncan, he is ready and follows them back to their hideout, rescuing Fitz, who is about to be guillotined and confronting their leader, a wild-eyed fanatic who wants to destroy all Immortals. He gets away, leaving a shattered MacLeod to mourn his friend and teacher. The season ends with MacLeod vowing revenge on the men and pouring Darius' ashes into the Seine, to flow out to the sea ("The Hunters").

=== Season 2 (1993–94) ===
This season opened with a new title sequence and a mysterious voice over explaining who Duncan MacLeod is and giving a quick summary of the Rules of the Game. Not so mysterious a voice, as we were to find out, as it is the voice of Joe Dawson. In the first story, ("The Watchers"), a bitter MacLeod returns to Seacouver, determined to find Darius' killers, but with only the Chronicle left by Darius to guide him. He follows a clue to a bookstore, where the manager, Dawson, denies knowing about the book. When MacLeod chases down two men watching from across the street, Dawson follows and tells Duncan that he is his Watcher, one of a secret society of mortals who observe and record the history of the Immortals, but never interfere. He refuses to believe MacLeod's assertion that Darius was murdered by mortals, but is forced to when the leader of the killers is revealed to be his own brother-in-law, James Horton. MacLeod confronts Horton, who shoots him, but not before MacLeod extracts his vengeance for Darius and runs Horton through with his sword. Believing Horton dead, but now aware of the Watchers, MacLeod carries on with his life and tries to help two old friends, but with differing results. Gregor Powers has become a photographer but has lost touch with his humanity, pushing his feelings for others away to avoid the recurring pain of loss ("Studies In Light"). Duncan helps him to learn to value his life and the gift of his Immortality, whilst watching his own former lover, Linda Plager, who is mortal, die of old age and infirmity. Soon after, another Immortal friend, Michael Moore, appears, looking for Mac's help in hunting down Quenten Barnes, Michael's long time enemy, who has reappeared after a long absence ("Turnabout"). Also reappearing is Joe Dawson, who tries to enlist Duncan's help, as Barnes is hunting down and killing the men who tried and executed him years before ("Turnabout"). Barnes was buried and has only recently been disinterred. An uneasy peace is struck between Watcher and Immortal, as the terrible truth dawns – Michael is Quenten Barnes, the two sides of his personality fragmented into a schizophrenic existence. As Quenten slowly takes permanent control, Michael pleads with Duncan to end it and MacLeod kills his friend. During this episode, Mac takes Richie to a martial arts gym, or dojo, run by Charlie DeSalvo, where they intend to train. Thoughts of extra-curricular activities are put aside as the reopening of the antiques shop gets nearer. After a spooky encounter with a palm reader reminds Mac of the gypsies' warning that he will never marry, he tempts fate by asking Tessa to marry him. Overjoyed, she accepts and, as they plan the wedding, Mac is lured from the shop by a group of Watchers, whose leader, Pallin Wolf, stuns Richie and kidnaps Tessa. Using her as a lure, he entices MacLeod to his home, where he has a lightless room in which he hunts and kills Immortals, using a nightscope to see his prey (a la "Silence Of The Lambs"). Fate smiles on Mac by allowing him to defeat Wolf and rescue Tessa despite "The Darkness", but he makes a decision that will haunt him. Sending Tessa with Richie, he stays to rifle the man's files, but as they leave, they are mugged and shot dead. MacLeod runs out to find them both lying in the street. As he holds Tessa in his arms, Richie revives, a newborn Immortal. Grief-stricken, MacLeod sells the store. Richie arrives at the loft one night with a girl he has rescued, who was being pursued by an Immortal ("Under Color Of Authority"). From the description, Duncan recognizes that the hunter is Mako, an eternal lawman. The girl is evasive, but it transpires that she is on the run for murdering her husband, who abused her, but she fears that she will be killed if she goes back, as her husband's father runs the town. Mako doesn't care – he has a warrant and will take her back to stand trial. Richie refuses to stand by and helps her to flee, but when Mako accidentally kills the girl, Richie is enraged and challenges Mako, whom he kills, despite Duncan pleading with him not to. For the first time, Richie feels the power of a Quickening, but it is tinged with sadness as Mac tells him that he is now on his own and must leave.

=== Season 3 (1994–95) ===
Duncan takes Anne to a recital by a choir of monks, one of whom, Paul, is an Immortal. Neither man realises that the song being sung is "The Song Of The Executioner", as the unseen impresario who organised the concert is Kalas, an Immortal with scores to settle with both Duncan and Paul. Kalas kills Paul and then sets about destroying MacLeod, first by framing Joe for dealing drugs then by killing two of Anne's patients and fabricating hospital records to make it look like she is responsible. Duncan realises that Kalas is behind this and, having cleared Joe and Anne, confronts his enemy. As they fight, Anne sees Duncan fall to his death, but Richie gets her away before Duncan revives.

In the midst of this, Richie embarks on a new career in motorcycle racing. Rather than tell Anne the truth, especially with Kalas at large, Duncan leaves Seacouver, arranging for Maurice to buy back the barge in Paris. Arriving in Paris, Duncan is greeted by Hugh Fitzcairn, who is teaching cookery at the Cordon Bleu, ("Star Crossed"). The normally philandering Fitz is in love but has a rival, who tries to kill him by running the two Immortals off the road. At the same time, Richie arrives in France, looking to build on his American successes in motorcycling. Whilst Fitz tells Duncan he should trust Anne, Kalas frames Fitz for the murder of his rival. On the run, Fitz is confronted by Kalas, who beheads him as MacLeod helplessly watches. When Duncan comes for Kalas, his nemesis escapes into a cloud of steam.

Determined to finish Kalas, Duncan seeks Joe's help. Kalas owns a nightclub and Duncan "persuades" the bartender to tell him where Kalas has gone. Kalas has captured his own Watcher and is looking for information on "Methos", the legendary oldest Immortal. After Kalas kills one of the Watchers' historians, Donald Salzer, Dawson sends Duncan to a researcher on the Methos Chronicle, Adam Pierson. Duncan is stunned to find that Pierson is Methos. Kalas confronts Methos, who escapes and sets up Duncan to take his head, realising that he cannot handle Kalas, but Duncan could. Duncan refuses, but when he confronts Kalas at Methos' apartment, their fight is interrupted by the police, who arrest Kalas for Salzer's murder after Adam Pierson identifies Kalas. Before he vanishes from Paris, Methos tells Duncan that he couldn't take the chance on Kalas winning.

In the two part season Finale, Amanda arrives at the barge, being very, very nice to Duncan, which always arouses his suspicions, ("Finale"). Eventually, she tells him that she broke Kalas out of jail, to kill him, but that Kalas got away. Kalas, using the thugs employed by his cellmate, wastes no time in coming for MacLeod and, as Duncan and Amanda try to find him, finds Maurice, who Duncan rescues in the nick of time and sends out of Paris. Kalas captures Amanda, intending to use her as bait, but she escapes. A new problem arises, when Joe Dawson and Methos arrive at the barge. Christine Salzer, the widow of Donald Salzer, the historian Kalas murdered, has found a database created for the Watchers and intends to give it to the newspapers. Dawson tries to stop her, even trying to shoot her, but MacLeod prevents him from becoming a murderer, taking the bullet himself.

As the Immortals think that their secret will be on CNN, Kalas intercepts Christine and kills her, taking the vital disk. He uses the information to find the European head of the Watchers and kills him. He gives Duncan a choice – surrender to him or Kalas will broadcast the information on the disk. Watchers and Immortals combine to hunt Kalas down. Methos tells Duncan to fight Kalas. Amanda and Duncan, faced with the destruction of their world, finally admit their feelings for each other openly. Duncan faces Kalas on the top of the Eiffel Tower and takes his enemy's head. The Quickening of such a powerful Immortal surges through the steelwork of the tower and overloads the Paris power grid, plunging the city into darkness and, in the process, blowing up Kalas' computer and destroying the disk. After celebrating Duncan's victory over Kalas and remembering Paul and Fitzcairn, Joe and Methos leave Duncan and Amanda alone to work out how much of what they said to each other they really want to take back.

=== Season 4 (1995–96) ===
With Kalas dead, MacLeod is free to return to his normal life and resumes his interest in antiques, until one night he sees a bracelet in a private showing at a dealer's, a bracelet he thought long buried. Shadowed by a curious Joe Dawson, he returns to his native Scotland for the first time in two hundred years to return it to the grave of his first love, Debra Campbell. Once in Glenfinnan, he is greeted with hostility by Rachel MacLeod, the local innkeeper, as the village is beset once again by mysterious murders. With the villagers recounting the legend of Duncan MacLeod, who rose from the dead to claim his father's sword and kill the Viking raider, Kanwulf, Rachel slowly comes to trust Duncan as the legend plays itself out again and, this time, Duncan make sure he takes the Viking's head and Quickening before leaving Glenfinnan at peace. (this marked Adrian Paul's directorial debut in the series). The episode that followed saw the final guest appearance of Phillip Akin as Charlie DeSalvo who was killed by immortal Andrew Cord in Brothers in Arms. The season also saw the friendship of Joe and Duncan temporally end. But mid season saw Duncan like never before as an evil immortal after being affected by the Dark Quickening which corrupts him leading him to turn on his friends (Richie and Joe). In the episode Deliverence, Duncan with the help of Methos is able to overcome the evil inside him. The cliffhanger ending to Season Four starts with a telephone call that brings Joe Dawson to Paris, in the belief that MacLeod is dead. Standing on the Quai, he is kidnapped in front of Duncan, who finds out from Methos that Joe is on trial for his life before the Watcher tribunal. Watchers are being killed across Europe and the Watchers believe that Joe's revelation of their secret is the root cause, unaware that it is the consequences of their own hypocrisy and double standards that is visiting destruction upon them. Blind to their own arrogance and willingness to interfere in the Game, they ignore Duncan's pleas for clemency. As they prepare to execute Dawson, it is they who are judged as a mysterious Immortal gun down the Watcher hierarchy and flees past Duncan, who arrives in time to find Dawson wounded and unconscious in the final scene.

=== Season 5 (1996–97) ===
After the events in "Judgment Day", the Watchers abandon all pretense of not interfering in the Game. Believing that MacLeod is responsible for the slaughter of the Watchers, Jack Shapiro, their head, orders his death and, at the beginning of "One Minute To Midnight", Duncan is trying to survive their manhunt. Believing the only way to avoid a war between the Watchers and the Immortals is to convince Shapiro of his innocence, MacLeod goes to their battle headquarters, only to find that the Immortal who is the real killer has beaten him to the punch. The bitter irony of the situation is revealed – Jacob Galati is hunting the Watchers after Horton killed his Immortal wife, Irena, during his rampage across Europe in 1992 that ended when he killed Darius in Paris, ("The Hunters"). Jacob refuses to believe that the Watchers are not evil, but agrees to meet Joe, who has been nursed back to health by Methos. Joe won't meet Jacob though and helps the Watchers to capture him. Duncan is forced to stand by whilst the Watchers murder Jacob and is devastated to receive his friend's Quickening. Methos rejects Joe and the Watchers for what they have become, but MacLeod returns to confront Shapiro, to put an end to the killing. When Shapiro refuses, Joe belatedly realizes that his friend has become another Horton and helps Duncan to secure peace with the Watchers. Wanting nothing to do with Paris, Duncan returns to Seacouver. There, he finds the Immortal Cassandra waiting for him. She is being hunted by Roland Kantos, one of her students, and she tells Duncan of a "Prophecy" that he will defeat great evil. Kantos relies on the hypnotic power of his voice to defeat his opponents, but Duncan, after nearly losing his head to Kantos' tricks, defeats the mesmerist by plugging his ears. Joe comes to the dojo and gets the cold shoulder from Duncan, but before he leaves, he tells MacLeod that Richie is in town, ("The End Of Innocence"). Duncan tries to make his peace with Richie, but the young Immortal is still plagued by nightmares after Duncan almost killed him in "Something Wicked" and warns Duncan to stay away from him. When Richie challenges and kills Carter Wellan, his mentor Haresh Clay comes for Richie, breaking his sword. Richie is arrested trying to steal another one from a museum and is bailed out by Duncan, who warns him that Clay is as good as they come and gives him a sword. The two Immortals work out their differences and, now acting as equals, it is Duncan who asks Richie to stand aside as he avenges his humiliation at Clay's hands when they first met and takes his head. In "Archangel" Duncan accidentally kills Richie thinking he is a demon he is destined to face.

=== Season 6 (1997–98) ===
The series dealt with the Ahriman story arc in the first two episodes. A majority of the season dealt with Duncan meeting some female Immortals. The producers were experimenting to look for a replacement to Duncan for the planned spin-off Highlander: The Raven. None of the regular cast appeared in episode 10. Duncan MacLeod didn't appear in episode 11, though Methos and Joe Dawson did.

== Production history ==
=== Origin ===
Highlander: The Series originated in Europe. Christopher Lambert, who had then starred in the first two Highlander movies, had previously worked with French leading entertainment conglomerate Gaumont's president Christian Charret. Lambert knew that Highlander producers Peter Davis and Bill Panzer wanted to make a Highlander series and connected them with Charret. Gaumont bought the rights to the series. Highlander was one of the first projects developed by Gaumont's television branch opened in 1992 and one of its financial backers was the French bank Credit du Nord. Gaumont took the risk of producing television series entirely in English, to enter international markets.

The French leading production company Gaumont Television bought the rights to the series to have it produced in syndication in America with a local crew, a ground-breaking move at the time. Highlander marked the first time a French production company was creatively involved in a show intended for the American market. The show was co-produced in syndication by international partners including Gaumont, RTL Plus (Germany), Rysher Distribution (United States), Reteitalia Productions (Italy), Amuse Video (Japan) and TF1 (France). The budget of the first season was US$26.1 million. Keith Samples, president of Rysher, stated that "about 75% of the guaranteed budget came from overseas sales." The remaining 25% came from United States sales and the producers retained the distribution rights, which allowed the show to produce $800,000 per episode only from international income, believed to be the top result of the 1992–1993 season. To secure an adequate share of European content, and as a result of the co-production agreement, each season was divided into two segments, the first segment was filmed in Vancouver, British Columbia, Canada (posing at the fictional location of Seacouver, Washington, United States), the second in Paris, France. The production of the first segment began in Vancouver on July 13, 1992, while the production of the second segment started in December 1992 in Paris and used the studios of French state production agency Société Française de Production (SFP) at Bry-sur-Marne near Paris.

The French government changed quota rules around the time production for the second series started, forcing TF1 to withdraw from production, as the government claimed that Highlander did not qualify as a French production. Gaumont found a new partner, niche commercial channel M6, who offered half of the costs offered by TF1.

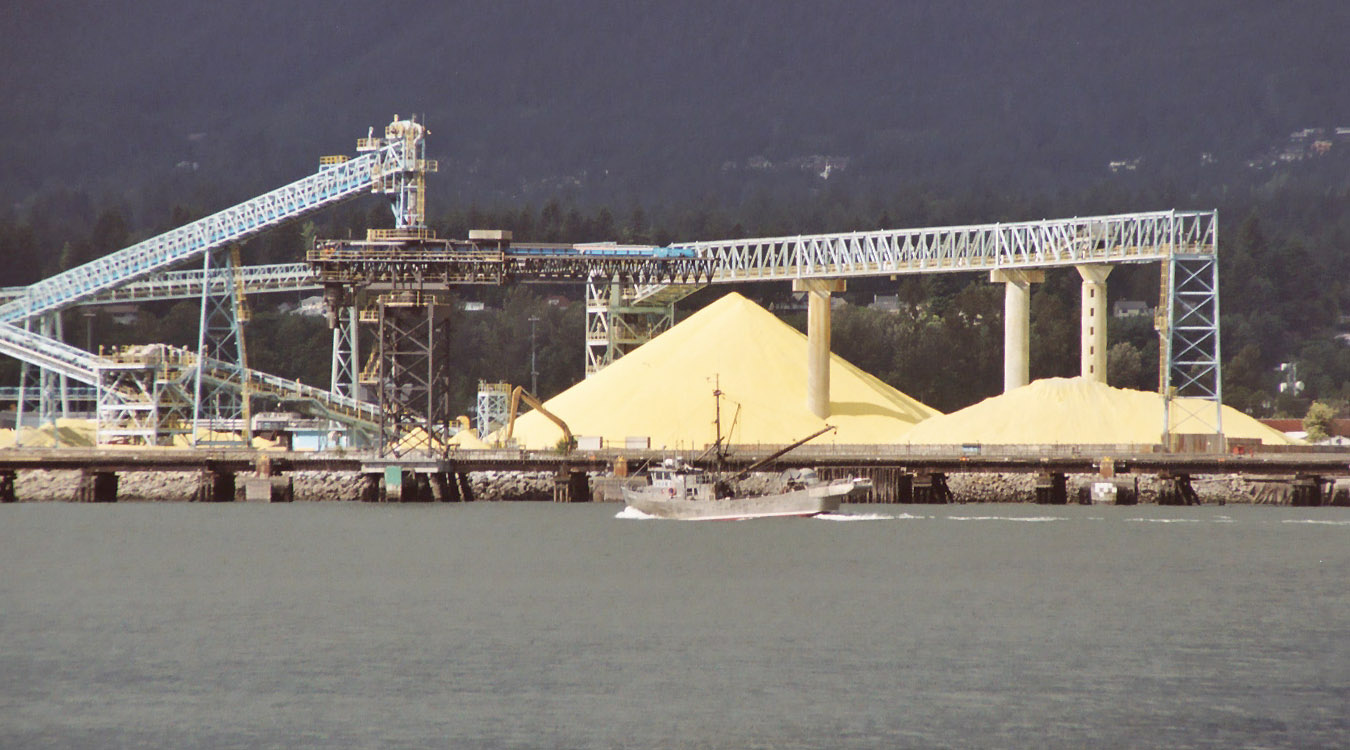
The establishing shot just before the swordfight at the end of the thirteenth episode, "Band of Brothers", was filmed at Vancouver Harbour, British Columbia, Canada

The executive producers were Bill Panzer, Peter S. Davis, Gaumont Television president Christian Charret and Gaumont co-production chief Marla Ginsburg. Steven Maier, Sheryl Hardy and Guy Collins were co-executive producers. Kevin Droney and Philip John Taylor were supervising producers at the beginning of the season; from the seventh episode onwards, David Abramowitz became supervising producer instead of Taylor. The producers were Barry Rosen and Gary Goodman for Season One, replaced by Ken Gord from Season Two til the end of the Season Six. Executives in charge of production were Marc du Pontavice and Denis Leroy. Scripts were contributed by both staff and freelance writers, Brian Clemens among the latter. Brent-Carl Clackson was line producer on the Vancouver segment, from episode one to thirteen. When production moved to Paris, Clackson was succeeded by Patrick Millet (with the title of production manager) for episodes fourteen to twenty-two. The regular directors were Thomas J. Wright, Jorge Montesi and Ray Austin. The fencing coach was Bob Anderson, who coined for himself the title of Master of Swords. Anderson choreographed the fights on the Vancouver segment then was succeeded by Peter Diamond, credited as second unit director and stunt coordinator on the Paris segment. At the beginning of Season 3, F. Braun McAsh became the Swordmaster and choreographed the remaining four seasons and the fourth movie, Endgame. The opening theme was "Princes of the Universe" from the 1986 album A Kind of Magic by Queen; incidental music was composed by Roger Bellon. The pilot episode was originally intended to be a third Highlander movie (to act as a television movie), but the low budget and Lambert agreeing to reprise his role as Connor MacLeod late into production caused the pilot to be written as a one-hour pilot.

=== Location ===
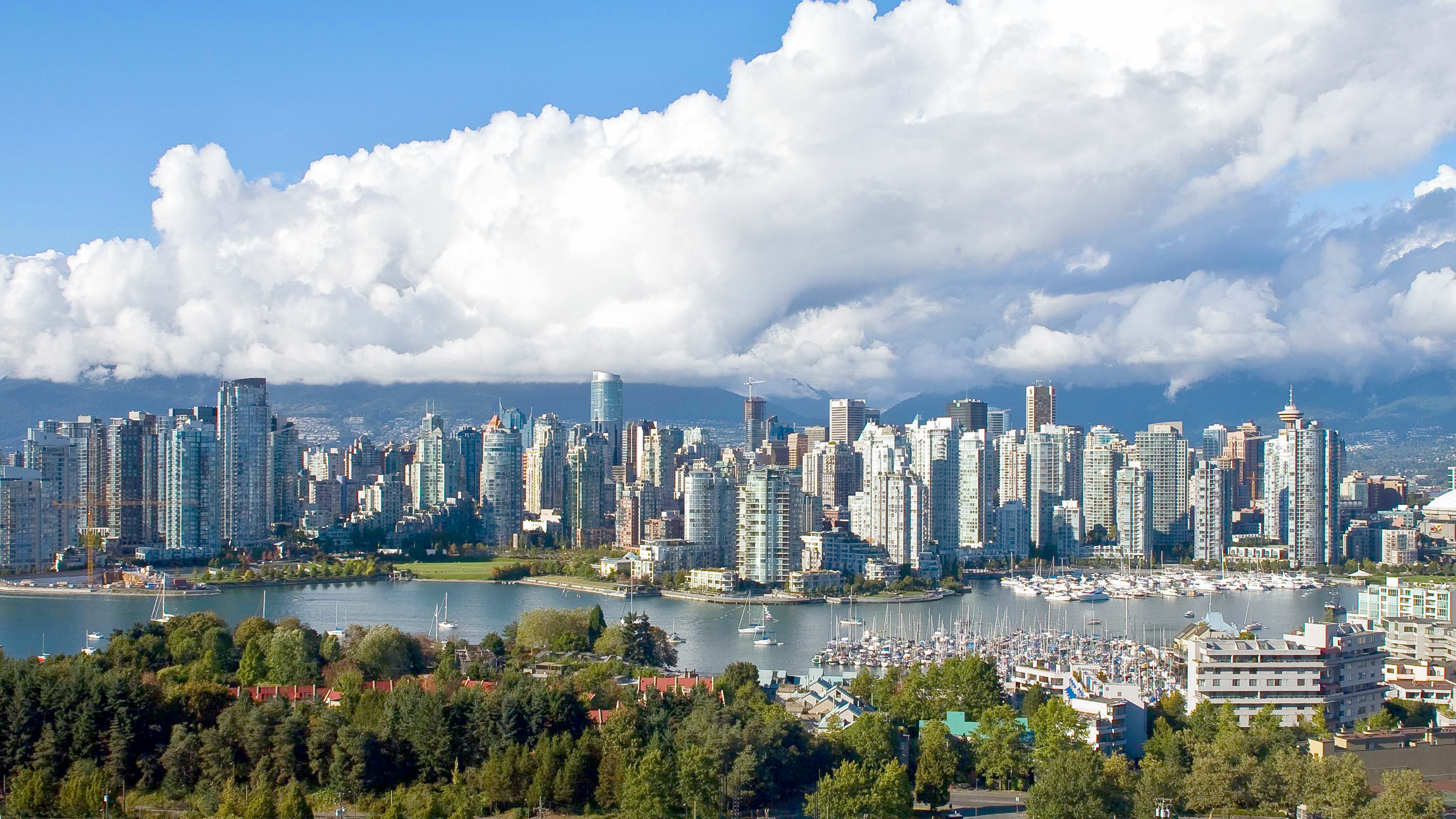
The first segment of the season was filmed in Vancouver, British Columbia, Canada

Although Immortals are scattered around the world, the events of the series are most notably located in Vancouver, British Columbia and Paris, France. However, flashbacks during the series often brought the show to a variety of places. The locations for the present switched just past the midway point of seasons 1–5 from Seattle/Vancouver to Paris. Thus it became the second international TV series about a Scottish swashbuckler in France after the series Quentin Durward which had already been shot in back in 1970 and resembles many of Duncan MacLeod's (and Connor MacLeod's) historical flashbacks. In Paris, Duncan lived on a barge located on the Seine River (at approximately 48.836743°N 2.374941°E) while in the fictional city of "Seacouver, WA" (somewhere in the Pacific Northwest) Duncan moved after Tessa's death from their antiques store to an apartment above his recently acquired freestyle dojo.

== Home media ==
=== VHS release ===
Beginning in 1995, full seasons of Highlander were released on VHS. These releases were the European cuts of the episodes, with each episode having approximately four minutes of additional footage not seen on American television. The first four season sets featured 11 VHS tapes, with two episodes on each tape. Prior to the release of the individual seasons, in October 1993, a feature-length release titled Highlander: The Gathering was released on VHS, which combined the episodes "The Gathering" and "Revenge is Sweet".

=== DVD releases ===
The series has been released on home video in various collections. Anchor Bay Entertainment released all six seasons on DVD in Region 1 between 2002 and 2005. The company also released a 15-episode best-of collection, as well as a collection containing all six seasons. In addition, Anchor Bay released several two-part episodes on single DVDs and edited them together to present them as feature-length films. For example, "Counterfeit" and "Counterfeit Part Two" were released on a single DVD as Highlander: Counterfeit.

In April 2018, Visual Entertainment re-released Highlander: The Complete Series on DVD in Region 1. The 22-disc collection includes all 119 episodes of the series as well as 6 hours of bonus content and also comes with a spin-off series Highlander: The Raven.

==== Seasons ====
Season	Episodes	Originally aired	DVD release date	
Season	Episodes	Originally aired	Region 1	Discs
1	22	1992 – 1993	US, Canada: November 12, 2002	9
2	22	1993 – 1994	US, Canada: July 29, 2003	8
3	22	1994 – 1995	US, Canada: November 18, 2003	8
4	22	1995 – 1996	US, Canada: April 13, 2004	9
5	18	1996 – 1997	US, Canada: August 10, 2004	9
6	13	1997 – 1998	US, Canada: February 8, 2005	8

==== Non-season DVDs ====
DVD name	Ep #	Release date	Additional information/Special features
The Best of Highlander: Deluxe Collector's Edition	13	2002	
Highlander: Counterfeit	2	May 25, 2004	Contains two episodes: "Counterfeit" and "Counterfeit Part Two"
Highlander: Finale	2	May 25, 2004	Contains two episodes: "Finale" and "Finale Part 2"
Highlander: Unholy Alliance	2	May 25, 2004	Contains two episodes: "Unholy Alliance" and "Unholy Alliance Part Two"
Highlander: The Ultimate Collection—Best of the Best	15	April 17, 2007	Highlander in Paris: Tour of Paris with director Dennis Berry and producer Bill Panzer; The Cutting Edge: Swordfighting demonstrations with stuntmen F. Braun McAsh and Anthony De Longis; Highlander Worldwide: Featurette focusing on Highlander fans; Gameplay: Making of the Highlander video game; Marto: Interview with swordmakers
Highlander: Immortal Collection	119	June 8, 2007	Episode-by-episode Commentary from Bill Panzer & David Abramowitz; Audio Commentaries from Adrian Paul, Stan Kirsch, Gillian Horvath, Anthony Delongis, and Elizabeth Gracen; Immortal Memories: Season finale retrospective; 400 Years: The Journeys of Duncan MacLeod; Interviews with cast and crew; Watcher Chronicles: Lives of the Immortals; Lost scenes, Photo galleries; Production designs & sketches, Blooper reel; DVD-ROM: All 22 scripts, Favorite Quickenings, La Carrera Panamericana, Actor, Director & Writer Bios, trivia, fight scripts, production notes, working scripts, shooting schedules; Clan MacLeod Mini-Sword letter opener
Highlander: The Complete Series	119	April 3, 2018	

== Reception ==
Critical reaction to Highlander: The Series has been generally favorable, and more favorable in general than the film sequels to the original Highlander, which have mostly received negative reviews (with the exception of the anime film Highlander: The Search for Vengeance, which has received more positive reviews).

Rob Lineberger of DVD Verdict said: "The direction is sometimes uncertain, but Highlander: The Series gives viewers something unique and inspiring. Each episode gives us a provocative glimpse into the trials and concerns of immortality, great swordfights, stylish flashbacks to bygone eras, and occasionally wicked immortals with awesome quickenings." Lineberger also added: "These actors, writers, producers, directors, and crew delivered one of television's great successes, particularly in the fantasy genre. Highlander: The Series took us to places we otherwise could not have gone, and did so with intelligence, style, and wit." Lineberger gave the six seasons scores of 92, 93, 90, 92, 87, and 70 out of 100, respectively.

Abbie Bernstein of Audio Video Revolution said: "Although it would be another two years until the series fully hit its stride, it was already [in the first season] offering something out of the ordinary narratively; in terms of production value, it remains one of the best-looking quasi-period shows ever to come down the pike, holding its own and then some against much better-funded product from the major studios." David Oliver of CHUD.com said that "whereas the sequels ultimately strayed from the mythology of the original [film] in the pursuit of more storytelling (translation: more money), the series built upon the mythology."

Carlo Cavagna of About Film criticized the series, saying that it consisted of "pedestrian one-hour confrontations pitting Duncan MacLeod against one overacting nefarious immortal after another, each a pale imitation of Clancy Brown's delicious overarching villainy in the first film" and felt that the series featured "a wide array of unappealing supporting characters" and that "the writers didn't know what to do with the Highlander concept." Similarly, Danél Griffin of Film as Art remarked that "the six-season Highlander: The Series has a loyal following, but let's be honest: Adrian Paul, the lead, is not an interesting actor, and there's not one moment in the show—not one—that comes close to matching the wit or liveliness of the first film."

Critics have pointed to the middle seasons of the show as its best. Lineberger remarked: "There was a dramatic boost in quality from season one to season two. Season two had better writing and quality control, [and] season three is better than season two." Bernstein claimed that "during season five, [the show] was at the peak of its creative glory." Kathie Huddleston of Syfy said that "season four was arguably the best season of the series, as the show said goodbye to characters from the previous season and delved into what made the regulars and the most notable recurring characters tick."

Critics have singled out the sixth and final season as the worst of the series. Lineberger remarked: "I haven't attempted to hide my disappointment with this season. For the first time ever in my life as a Highlander enthusiast, I found myself utterly uncaptivated." Oliver awarded the sixth season a score of 3.9 out of 10, saying: "Like The X-Files, Highlander: The Series simply went on too long. If the star is wanting to get out of a show as much as Paul was ready to hang up his katana, then I say let it go."

== In other media ==
=== Reunion ===
In 2008, a reunion special was filmed starring Peter Wingfield, Elizabeth Gracen, and Jim Byrnes reprising their roles. The 17-minute special was a low budget project that takes place 10 years after the series (or between the fourth and fifth movies). Filming took place at producer Peter Davis' former beach home with the actors volunteering in their roles. The plot involved the characters discussing Methos' plans to get married and settle down with a mortal woman and her son.

=== Audio plays ===
In 2009, Big Finish released a series of four officially licensed audio adventures featuring Adrian Paul as Duncan MacLeod. They are set sometime after the events of the film Highlander: Endgame. Each play in the first season is around an hour long, and contains a new music score and new Highlander audio theme by Jamie Robertson. The audio series has discontinued. The episodes are:

- The Lesson – The story introduces an immortal named Pieter Gatlan, who challenges and defeats Duncan every ten years but never beheads him. Starring Adrian Paul and Trevor Cooper. Written by Trevor Baxendale.
- Love and Hate – A roof-top duel between sword-wielding combatants becomes the talk of Seacouver, but Duncan is perplexed when both bodies are found with their heads intact. He discovers there may be a sexually transmitted infection that affects immortals. Starring Adrian Paul and Beth Chalmers. Written by Colin Harvey.
- The Secret of the Sword – A known expert on swords and old weapons, Duncan MacLeod is called in to help Seacouver police value an antique blade. Duncan recognizes the sword as belonging to Michael Kent, an immortal he killed, and recalls an encounter with a samurai. Starring Adrian Paul and Toby Longworth. Written by Jonathan Clements.
- Kurgan Rising – With an increasing number of Immortals disappearing, Duncan and Watcher Joe Dawson investigate. Events lead to an immortal dying on holy ground, seemingly upsetting a balance in nature. The dead seem to rise, including Connor MacLeod and his ancient enemy the Kurgan. Starring Adrian Paul and Toby Longworth. Written by Cavan Scott & Mark Wright.

In 2011 Big Finish released a box set containing a linked series of four audio adventures featuring the actors who played the Four Horsemen in the TV series, pitted against a new recurring villain. These are:

- Brothers – Kronos (Valentine Pelka) recalls the formation of the Four Horsemen and the reasons they separated. Written by Scott Andrews.
- All The King's Horses – An amnesiac man wakes with a box of documents about 'Silas' (Richard Ridings). Written by Scott Andrews. Shortlisted for a Scribe Award.
- The Pain-Eater – The secret history of Caspian (Marcus Testory) is revealed. Written by Scott Andrews.
- The Promise – Methos (Peter Wingfield) tracks down the man who has tormented all four horsemen for thousands of years. As he does so, he recounts the story of his life and his greatest love. Written by James Moran.

=== A Celtic Opera ===
Duncan also appears in Highlander: A Celtic Opera, an opera jointly composed by Roger Bellon and Harlan Collins. The opera follows Duncan's banishment from his clan, his relationship with a mortal woman named Aurora who becomes his first wife, and his encounters with an immortal Visigoth named Fritagern. In the end, Duncan beheads Fritagern in the 21st century after the man murders a cloned Aurora on their wedding day.

=== Books ===
The ten Highlander: The Series novels published from October 1995 to September 2000 are canon. Events from them are included in the Watcher Chronicles CD-ROM, which contains an extensive database of the events and immortals of the television series.

- 1995 October Highlander: The Element of Fire, by Jason Henderson — The chronicles of Duncan's training days with Connor MacLeod; the friendship between the two Highlanders through the centuries. A bloodthirsty and immortal pirate Khordas vows to kill the Highlander, making for a fearsome enemy that haunts Duncan and Connor for hundreds of years.
- 1996 February Highlander: Scimitar, by Ashley McConnell – When Joe Dawson receives an ancient sword, it triggers Duncan's remembrance of his involvement in the Arab Revolt in 1916.
- 1996 September Highlander: Scotland the Brave, by Jennifer Roberson – Annie Devlin returns to draw Duncan into a new quest to win independence for Ireland. He is reluctant, given his history with failed attempts to free his homeland, including his culpability in the fate of the Stone of Scone.
- 1997 May Highlander: Measure of a Man by Nancy Holder – In Venice, Italy 1655, Duncan meets legendary manipulator – and, apparently, Immortal – Niccolò Machiavelli. Duncan only narrowly escaped Machiavelli's machinations once; he may not be so lucky when the Prince of Lies resurfaces in 20th century North America.
- 1997 August Highlander: The Path by Rebecca Neason – In 1781 Duncan meets a different kind of Immortal – the Dalai Lama. Soon the Highlander embarks on the path to enlightenment and peace. But that peace may be short-lived when the Immortal Nasiradeen invades Tibet.
- 1997 November Highlander: Zealot by Donna Lettow – Duncan MacLeod was there when Avram Mordecai fought the enemies of his Jewish people in World War II, as he has for two thousand years. Now he finds himself trapped between his honor and his loyalties when he protects a Palestinian diplomat from his old friend.
- 1998 June Highlander: Shadow of Obsession by Rebecca Neason – Once Darius was a man of war, laying siege to Rome. Centuries later, as a man of God, Darius touched the life of Duncan MacLeod. Now a spurned lover from Darius' warrior days returns for revenge against all he called friend.
- 1998 August Highlander: The Captive Soul by Josepha Sherman – Three millennia past, Methos aided the Ancient Egyptian pharaohs when the Hyksos invaded. He reluctantly becomes a spy inside the Hyksos royal house, when he meets the Immortal – and thoroughly insane – Prince Khyan. Methos misses his chance to take the madman's head, a mistake that returns to haunt him as the Oldest Immortal returns to find his sword, killing all in his path.
- 1999 February Highlander: White Silence by Ginjer Buchanan – MacLeod, Hugh Fitzcairn and his young apprentice get trapped in the frozen Yukon. There they face their deaths... over and over and over again.
- 2000 September Highlander: An Evening at Joe's – An anthology written by the cast and crew of Highlander: The Series:

"Letters from Viet Nam" by Jim Byrnes
"Train from Bordeaux" by Gillian Horvath
"The Star of Athena" by Laura Brennan
"Words to the Highlander" by Peter Hudson
"Pants" by Donna Lettow
"Consone's Diary" by Anthony De Longis
"Down Towards the Outflow" by Roger Bellon
"The Methos Chronicles: Part I" by Don Anderson
"From the Grave" by Stan Kirsch
"Postcards from Alexa" by Gillian Horvath and Donna Lettow

"World Enough and Time" (Horvath)
"World Enough and Time II" (Lettow)
"World Enough and Time III" (Horvath)
"Natural Wonders" (Lettow)
"Holy Ground" (both)
"The Man with No Name" (Lettow)
"Postcards from Athens" (Horvath)
"Night in Geneva" (Lettow)

"He Scores!" by Ken Gord
"The Staircase" by Valentine Pelka
"Death Shall Have No Dominion" by F. Braun McAsh
"A Time of Innocents" by Peter Wingfield
"The Other Side of the Mirror" by Dennis Berry and Darla Kershner

A German-language novel entitled Highlander: Die Rückkehr des Unsterblichen (Highlander: The Return of the Immortal) was also published in 1994. Co-written by Martin Eisele and Hans Sommer, it details Duncan wanting to leave "The Game" after he beheads a female Immortal. The book is not considered canonical.

== Spin-offs ==
=== Highlander: The Raven ===
Plans for a spin-off series led to four episodes of Highlander: The Series to focus on four new women immortals, each seen as a possible spin-off lead. The candidates introduced were Alex Raven (Dara Tomanovich), Kyra (Alice Evans), Katya (Justina Vail), and Reagan Cole (Sandra Hess). According to behind the scene interviews and Highlander: The Complete Watcher's Guide, fan reaction was largely negative or apathetic concerning these original characters. The lead role for Highlander: The Raven went to Elizabeth Gracen's popular recurring character Amanda. The spin-off only lasted one season due to low ratings and changes in how syndicated shows are marketed.

=== Highlander: Endgame (2000) ===
Highlander: Endgame was a theatrical film released to theaters on September 1, 2000. Rather than a direct sequel in the Highlander film franchise, it followed the continuity of the recently ended Highlander: The Series, acting as a franchise bridge by reuniting TV series protagonist Duncan MacLeod with his mentor and kinsman Connor MacLeod, the protagonist of the original film and its two sequels. The film's antagonist is Jacob Kell (Bruce Payne), an evil immortal who ignores the rules of the Game. Although the TV series had made a point to say Duncan had never been married, Endgame introduces Kate Devaney, retroactively revealed to be a pre-immortal Irish woman whom Duncan married in 1715 and then stabbed, activating her immortality. Resenting her ageless life and Duncan, Kate becomes a warrior for Kell in the modern day, calling herself Faith.

=== Highlander: The Source (2007) ===
Highlander: The Source was a made-for-TV movie that premiered on the Sci Fi Channel on September 15, 2007 and continued the canon of Highlander: The Series, set several years after Endgame. The film takes place in a future version of Earth where human society has descended into violence and chaos. Duncan MacLeod, his new mortal wife Anna Teshemka, and a group of allies seek an energy well in Eastern Europe that may be the legendary Source of immortality, all while fighting the Guardian (Cristian Solimeno), an immortal empowered with superhuman abilities.

The story and the mythology of the Source were meant to be expanded on with future films, but reception to The Source was largely negative and plans for follow-up stories were canceled. A 2008 short film called "Reunion", written by TV series producer David Abramowitz and directed by Don Paonessa, featured the series characters but did not acknowledge the events of Highlander: The Source. At the Highlander Worldwide Convention the next year, Abramowitz and others from the TV series referred to Highlander: The Source as a "bad dream" Duncan had. The Big Finish audio plays released in 2009 likewise do not reference the events of Highlander: The Source nor indicate that the story and its version of Earth are in Duncan's near future.

== In popular culture ==
In the TV series, Reaper, season 1, episode 15 ("Coming to Grips"), Bert "Sock" Wysocki pretends to be Duncan MacLeod as he wields the scythe "vessel" they are going to use to capture the escaped soul; presumably because — like swords in the Highlander series — it could be used to behead someone.

== See also ==
- Outlander (TV series), a Scottish science fantasy themed show.
- War of the Worlds: Goliath: a 2012 animated film for which many cast members of Highlander reunited to record voice acting work.
