= List of Highlander: The Series episodes =

Highlander: The Series is a television series that originally aired from October 1, 1992 to May 16, 1998 in syndication. Highlander: The Series is a slight retcon of the 1986 feature film of the same name, it features a story-line in which the protagonist of the film (Connor MacLeod, a member of a race of "Immortals") has not won "the Prize" sought by all Immortals, who still exist post-1985. A total of 119 episodes aired over the course of 6 seasons.

== Series overview ==
Season	Episodes	Originally released	
Season	Episodes	First released	Last released
1	22	October 3, 1992	May 22, 1993
2	22	September 27, 1993	May 23, 1994
3	22	September 26, 1994	May 29, 1995
4	22	September 25, 1995	May 26, 1996
5	18	September 23, 1996	May 19, 1997
6	13	October 5, 1997	May 16, 1998

== Episodes ==
=== Season 1 (1992–93) ===
No. overall	No. in season	Title	Directed by	Written by	Original release date	Prod. code
1	1	"The Gathering"	Thomas J. Wright	Dan Gordon	October 3, 1992	92102-1
2	2	"Family Tree"	Jorge Montesi	Kevin Droney	October 10, 1992	92106-2
3	3	"The Road Not Taken"	Thomas J. Wright	Terry Nelson	October 17, 1992	92108-3
4	4	"Innocent Man"	Jorge Montesi	Dan Gordon	October 24, 1992	92103-4
5	5	"Free Fall"	Thomas J. Wright	Philip John Taylor	October 31, 1992	92101-5
6	6	"Bad Day in Building A"	Jorge Montesi	Kevin Droney	November 7, 1992	92107-6
7	7	"Mountain Men"	Thomas J. Wright	Marie-Chantal Droney	November 14, 1992	92110-7
8	8	"Deadly Medicine"	Ray Austin	Robert L. McCullough	November 21, 1992	92111-8
9	9	"The Sea Witch"	Thomas J. Wright	David Tynan	December 5, 1992	92112-9
10	10	"Revenge is Sweet"	Ray Austin	Loraine Despres	December 12, 1992	92109-10
11	11	"See No Evil"	Thomas J. Wright	Brian Clemens	December 19, 1992	92114-11
12	12	"Eyewitness"	Ray Austin	David Tynan	February 6, 1993	92115-12
13	13	"Band of Brothers"	René Manzor	Marie-Chantal Droney	February 13, 1993	92118-13
14	14	"For Evil's Sake"	Ray Austin	David Abramowitz and Fabrice Ziolkowski	February 20, 1993	92117-14
15	15	"For Tomorrow We Die"	Robin Davis	Philip John Taylor	February 27, 1993	92116-15
16	16	"The Beast Below"	Daniel Vigne	Marie-Chantal Droney	March 6, 1993	92123-16
17	17	"Saving Grace"	Ray Austin	Elizabeth Baxter and Martin Broussellet	March 13, 1993	92120-17
18	18	"The Lady and the Tiger"	Robin Davis	Philip John Taylor	April 24, 1993	92121-18
19	19	"Eye of the Beholder"	Dennis Berry	Christian Bouveron and Lawrence Shore	May 1, 1993	92124-19
20	20	"Avenging Angel"	Paolo Barzman	Fabrice Ziolkowski	May 8, 1993	92122-20
21	21	"Nowhere to Run"	Dennis Berry	David Abramowitz	May 15, 1993	92125-21
22	22	"The Hunters"	Paolo Barzman	Kevin Droney	May 22, 1993	92126-22

=== Season 2 (1993–94) ===
No. overall	No. in season	Title	Directed by	Written by	Original release date	Prod. code
23	1	"The Watchers"	Clay Borris	Marie-Chantal Droney	September 27, 1993	93201-23
24	2	"Studies in Light"	Peter Ellis	Naomi Janzen	October 4, 1993	93202-24
25	3	"Turnabout"	Clay Borris	David Tynan	October 11, 1993	93203-25
26	4	"The Darkness"	Paolo Barzman	Christian Bouveron & Lawrence Shore	October 18, 1993	93204-26
27	5	"Eye For An Eye"	Dennis Berry	Elizabeth Baxter and Martin Broussellet	October 25, 1993	93205-27
28	6	"The Zone"	Clay Borris	Peter Mohan	November 1, 1993	93206-28
29	7	"The Return of Amanda"	Dennis Berry	Story by Guy Mullaly; teleplay by David Tynan	November 8, 1993	93207-29
30	8	"Revenge of the Sword"	Clay Borris	Aubrey Solomon	November 15, 1993	93208-30
31	9	"Run For Your Life"	Dennis Berry	Naomi Janzen	November 22, 1993	93209-31
32	10	"Epitaph for Tommy"	Clay Borris	Philip John Taylor	November 29, 1993	93210-32
33	11	"The Fighter"	Peter Ellis	Morrie Ruvinsky	January 31, 1994	93211-33
34	12	"Under Color of Authority"	Clay Borris	Peter Mohan	February 7, 1994	93212-34
35	13	"Bless the Child"	Clay Borris	Elizabeth Baxter and Martin Broussellet	February 14, 1994	93213-35
36	14	"Unholy Alliance, Part 1"	Peter Ellis	David Tynan	February 21, 1994	93214-36
37	15	"Unholy Alliance, Part 2"	Peter Ellis	David Tynan	February 28, 1994	93215-37
38	16	"The Vampire"	Dennis Berry	J.P. Couture	March 7, 1994	93216-38
39	17	"Warmonger"	Bruno Gantillon	Christian Bouveron and Lawrence Shore	March 14, 1994	93217-39
40	18	"Pharaoh's Daughter"	Dennis Berry	Christian Bouveron and Lawrence Shore	April 25, 1994	93218-40
41	19	"Legacy"	Dennis Berry	Elizabeth Baxter	May 2, 1994	93219-41
42	20	"Prodigal Son"	Paolo Barzman	David Tynan	May 9, 1994	93220-42
43	21	"Counterfeit, Part 1"	Paolo Barzman	Story by David Tynan; teleplay by Brad Wright	May 16, 1994	93221-43
44	22	"Counterfeit, Part 2"	Dennis Berry	David Tynan	May 23, 1994	93222-44

=== Season 3 (1994–95) ===
No. overall	No. in season	Title	Directed by	Written by	Original release date	Prod. code
45	1	"The Samurai"	Dennis Berry	Naomi Janzen	September 26, 1994	94301
46	2	"Line of Fire"	Clay Borris	David Tynan	October 3, 1994	94302
47	3	"The Revolutionary"	Dennis Berry	Peter Mohan	October 10, 1994	94303
48	4	"The Cross of St. Antoine"	Dennis Berry	Morrie Ruvinsky	October 17, 1994	94304
49	5	"Rite of Passage"	Mario Azzopardi	Karen Harris	October 24, 1994	94305
50	6	"Courage"	Charles Wilkinson	Nancy Heiken	October 31, 1994	94306
51	7	"The Lamb"	Dennis Berry	J. P. Couture	November 7, 1994	94307
52	8	"Obsession"	Charles Wilkinson	Lawrence Shore	November 14, 1994	94308
53	9	"Shadows"	Charles Wilkinson	David Tynan	November 21, 1994	94309
54	10	"Blackmail"	Paolo Barzman	Morrie Ruvinsky	November 28, 1994	94310
55	11	"Vendetta"	George Mendeluk	Alan Swayze	December 5, 1994	94311
56	12	"They Also Serve"	Paolo Barzman	Lawrence Shore	February 6, 1995	94312
57	13	"Blind Faith"	Jerry Ciccoritti	Jim Makichuk	February 13, 1995	94313
58	14	"Song of the Executioner"	Paolo Barzman	David Tynan	February 20, 1995	94314
59	15	"Star-Crossed"	Paolo Barzman	Jim Makichuk	February 27, 1995	94315
60	16	"Methos"	Dennis Berry	J. P. Couture	March 6, 1995	94316
61	17	"Take Back the Night"	Paolo Barzman	Alan Swayze	April 24, 1995	94317
62	18	"Testimony"	Dennis Berry	David Tynan	May 1, 1995	94318
63	19	"Mortal Sins"	Mario Azzopardi	Lawrence Shore	May 8, 1995	94319
64	20	"Reasonable Doubt"	Dennis Berry	Elizabeth Baxter	May 15, 1995	94320
65	21	"Finale, Part 1"	Mario Azzopardi	David Tynan	May 22, 1995	94321
66	22	"Finale, Part 2"	Dennis Berry	David Tynan	May 29, 1995	94322

=== Season 4 (1995–96) ===
No. overall	No. in season	Title	Directed by	Written by	Original release date	Prod. code
67	1	"Homeland"	Adrian Paul	David Tynan	September 25, 1995	95401
68	2	"Brothers in Arms"	Charles Wilkinson	Morrie Ruvinsky	October 2, 1995	95402
69	3	"The Innocent"	Dennis Berry	Alan Swayze	October 9, 1995	95403
70	4	"Leader of the Pack"	Mario Azzopardi	Lawrence Shore	October 16, 1995	95404
71	5	"Double Eagle"	Mario Azzopardi	David Tynan	October 23, 1995	95405
72	6	"Reunion"	Dennis Baxter	Elizabeth Baxter	October 30, 1995	95406
73	7	"The Colonel"	Dennis Berry	Drunford King	November 12, 1995	95407
74	8	"Reluctant Heroes"	Neill Fearnley	Scott Peters	November 19, 1995	95408
75	9	"The Wrath of Kali"	Duane Clark	David Tynan	November 26, 1995	95409
76	10	"Chivalry"	Paolo Barzman	Michael O'Mahoney, Sasha Reins	December 3, 1995	95410
77	11	"Timeless"	Duane Clark	Karen Harris	February 4, 1996	95411
78	12	"The Blitz"	Paolo Barzman	Morrie Ruvinsky	February 11, 1996	95412
79	13	"Something Wicked"	Dennis Berry	David Tynan	February 18, 1996	95413
80	14	"Deliverance"	Dennis Berry	David Tynan	February 25, 1996	95414
81	15	"Promises"	Paolo Barzman	Lawrence Shore	March 2, 1996	95415
82	16	"Methuselah's Gift"	Adrian Paul	Michael O'Mahoney, Sasha Reins	April 28, 1996	95416
83	17	"The Immortal Cimoli"	Yves Lafaye	Scott Peters	May 5, 1996	95417
84	18	"Through a Glass, Darkly"	Dennis Berry	Alan Swayze	May 12, 1996	95418
85	19	"Double Jeopardy"	Charles Wilkinson	David Tynan	May 3, 1996	95419
86	20	"Till Death"	Dennis Berry	Michael O'Mahoney, Sasha Reins	May 19, 1996	95420
87	21	"Judgment Day"	Gerard Hameline	David Tynan	May 26, 1996	95421
88	22	"One Minute to Midnight"	Dennis Berry	David Tynan	September 28, 1996	95422

=== Season 5 (1996–97) ===
No. overall	No. in season	Title	Directed by	Written by	Original release date	Prod. code
89	1	"Prophecy"	Dennis Berry	David Tynan	October 5, 1996	96501
90	2	"The End of Innocence"	Gerard Hameline	Morrie Ruvinsky	October 12, 1996	96502
91	3	"Manhunt"	Peter Ellis	David Tynan	October 19, 1996	96503
92	4	"Glory Days"	Gerard Hameline	Nancy Heiken	October 26, 1996	96504
93	5	"Dramatic License"	Peter Ellis	Michael O'Mahoney, Sasha Reins	November 2, 1996	96505
94	6	"Money No Object"	Rafal Zielinski	James Thorpe	November 9, 1996	96506
95	7	"Haunted"	James Bruce	Scott Peters	November 16, 1996	96507
96	8	"Little Tin God"	Rafal Zielinski	Richard Gilbert-Hill	November 23, 1996	96508
97	9	"The Messenger"	James Bruce	David Tynan	November 30, 1996	96509
98	10	"The Valkyrie"	Richard Martin	James Thorpe	February 1, 1997	96510
99	11	"Comes a Horseman"	Gerard Hameline	David Tynan	February 8, 1997	96511
100	12	"Revelation 6:8"	Adrian Paul	Tony DiFranco	February 15, 1997	96512
101	13	"The Ransom of Richard Redstone"	Gerard Hameline	David Tynan	February 22, 1997	96513
102	14	"Duende"	Richard Martin	Jan Hartman	March 1, 1997	96514
103	15	"The Stone of Scone"	Richard Martin	Michael O'Mahony and Sasha Reins	April 21, 1997	96515
104	16	"Forgive Us Our Trespasses"	Paolo Barzman	Dom Tordjmann	May 5, 1997	96516
105	17	"The Modern Prometheus"	Adrian Paul	James Thorpe	May 12, 1997	96517
106	18	"Archangel"	Dennis Berry	David Tynan	May 19, 1997	96518

=== Season 6 (1997–98) ===
No. overall	No. in season	Title	Directed by	Written by	Original release date	Prod. code
107	1	"Avatar"	Dennis Berry	David Tynan	October 5, 1997	97601
108	2	"Armageddon"	Richard Martin	Tony DiFranco	October 11, 1997	97602
109	3	"Sins of the Father"	Dennis Berry	James Thorpe	October 18, 1997	97603
110	4	"Diplomatic Immunity"	Richard Martin	James Thorpe	October 25, 1997	97604
111	5	"Patient Number 7"	Dennis Berry	David Tynan	November 1, 1997	97605
112	6	"Black Tower"	Richard Martin	Morrie Ruvinsky	November 8, 1997	97606
113	7	"Unusual Suspects"	Dennis Berry	Morrie Ruvinsky	November 15, 1997	97607
114	8	"Justice"	Richard Martin	Michael O'Mahomey, Sasha Reins	November 22, 1997	97608
115	9	"Deadly Exposure"	Dennis Berry	James Thorpe	January 31, 1998	97609
116	10	"Two of Hearts"	Richard Martin	James Thorpe	February 14, 1998	97610
117	11	"Indiscretions"	Dennis Berry	James Thorpe	May 2, 1998	97611
118	12	"To Be"	Richard Martin	David Tynan	May 9, 1998	97612
119	13	"Not To Be"	Dennis Berry	David Tynan	May 16, 1998	97613
