= Fogelmania Productions =

American animation studio

- Type: Animation studio
- Industry: Animation
- Founded: 1993
- Founder: Eric Fogel
- Headquarters: United States
- Products: Celebrity Deathmatch

Fogelmania Productions is an animation studio founded by animator Eric Fogel, known for creating MTV's Celebrity Deathmatch.

== Productions ==
- The Head (1994–1996)
- Celebrity Deathmatch (1998–2002; 2006–2007)
- Charlie and Chunk (2004; shown on the Nicktoons Film Festival)
- Starveillance (2007)
- Anton and Crapbag (2008)
- Glenn Martin, DDS (2009–2011)
