= MTV Animation =

Television network animation department

MTV Animation Inc.
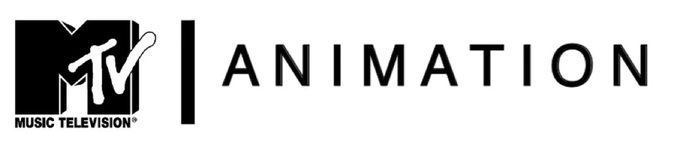
- Type: Division
- Industry: Animation
- Founded: 1993; 33 years ago
- Founders: Abby Terkuhle
- Products: Television; Movies
- Parent: MTV Entertainment Group (1993–2025); Paramount Television Studios (2025–present)

MTV Animation is an American animation studio and the animation department of the television network MTV. The department's parent company is Paramount Television Studios, which is owned by Skydance. MTV Animation gained substantial popularity in the 1990s, with many of their largest successes including the original broadcasts of Liquid Television (1991–1995), Beavis and Butt-Head (1993–1997), Daria (1997–2002), and Celebrity Deathmatch (1998–2007). Of the animated shows that aired, Beavis and Butt-Head and Daria became the studio's most successful programs, with both shows developing a cult following.

Reruns of MTV's completed animated shows aired on MTV2 and The N throughout much of the 2000s. There were some attempts by MTV Entertainment Group to revive original animation production in the 2010s, but they never materialized.

== History ==
In 1991, MTV debuted its first full-length animated series, Liquid Television, which helped launch Beavis and Butt-Head and Æon Flux. MTV established its own in-house animation studio in 1993 to work on Beavis and Butt-Head and other projects. While MTV's animation department is often grouped with Nickelodeon's (as both channels were part of MTV Networks), the two entities are mostly separate. MTV's cartoons are known for their dark humor, adult jokes, graphic violence, pop culture references, and irreverence.

In an interview for the Beavis and Butt-Head Do America DVD, Mike Judge described MTV Animation as being very ad hoc: Beavis and Butt-Head didn't have an art director until the film was made, so until the film they'd never considered color palettes from scene to scene. In the same interview, art director Yvette Kaplan said "everything was overlapping... we never had the luxury of one part [episode] finished" before another episode was finished.

As Beavis and Butt-Head was wrapping up production, MTV was looking to create an animated show that catered more to girls and a more intelligent audience. Comedy writer Glenn Eichler and producer Susie Lewis Lynn had both previously worked on Beavis and Butt-Head and were tasked with co-creating a spin-off. The result was the animated series Daria (1997–2002), which centered around the character Daria Morgendorffer. Daria ended up being one of MTV Animation's biggest successes, with MTV airing 65 episodes of the series across five seasons from March 1997 to June 2001. Daria also included the full-length television movies Is It Fall Yet? and Is It College Yet?, which aired on MTV in August 2000 and January 2002, respectively. The DVD set Daria: The Complete Animated Series was released in May 2010, containing all 65 episodes, both movies, and a multitude of extras—including a script to an unaired Mystik Spiral pilot episode written by Eichler. However, much of the licensed music on the DVD release was taken out due to licensing costs. Eichler planned on writing and producing a spin-off series that centered around Daria character Trent Lane and his band, Mystik Spiral. However, the halting of animation production at MTV in 2002 prevented the spin-off from materializing.

Many MTV animation productions do not survive a single season and in some cases are canceled before completion. Productions including Undergrads, Downtown, Station Zero, 3-South, and Clone High have been highly acclaimed, yet none of them got renewed beyond their first season, usually due to lack of an audience or advertising. By 2001, the animation department was shut down, with the network's animated series now being outsourced to different studios. During the 2000s, MTV would phase out of producing original animation in favor of importing shows, usually reruns of shows from sister networks Comedy Central and Nickelodeon. The MTV Animation brand was briefly revived from 2006 to 2007 as part of a push to produce animated series for MTV2.

In 2011, MTV would return to adult animation. Its first production was a relaunch of Beavis and Butt-Head, which premiered in October 2011; this was quickly followed by Good Vibes, starting later in the same month. In November 2011, MTV said they plan a third cartoon, Worst Friends Forever by Thomas Middleditch, that Mike Judge would produce, about three teenage girls who hover on the outskirts of popularity and have to cope with cattiness and crushes; a pilot had been picked up and concept art of the characters was released. The cartoons did not do as expected though. Good Vibes was cancelled in February 2012 due to low ratings, on the same day the DVD came out, Beavis and Butt-Head was cancelled in December 2011, and Worst Friends Forever never aired. In a September 2012 interview on "Making It With Riki Lindhome", Middleditch said Worst Friends was "for all intents and purposes done" and "not in my hands anymore". Mike Judge said in January 2014 that he might pitch Beavis and Butt-Head to another network.

=== Current animation ===
In August 2020, ViacomCBS's Entertainment & Youth Group launched a new strategy to expand its adult animation units. This initiative planned to produce various animated shows under the revitalized MTV Entertainment Group. Beavis and Butt-Head was rebooted, a planned Daria spinoff became a cancelled film and had been announced for Comedy Central and Paramount+. An animated sequel revival series of Everybody Hates Chris titled Everybody Still Hates Chris premiered on September 25, 2024. It also produced the Clone High revival seasons on at Max (now HBO Max) premiered on May 23, 2023, at the relaunch of the platform.

== Productions ==
=== Television series ===
Title	Creator/Developer(s)	Premiere date	Finale date	Co-production with	Network	Note(s)
MTV Animation
1990s
Beavis and Butt-Head	Mike Judge	March 8, 1993; October 27, 2011	November 28, 1997; December 29, 2011	3 Arts Entertainment; Judgmental Films; Inbred Jed's Homemade Cartoons (Pilot); J. J. Sedelmaier Productions, Inc. (1993); MTV Production Development (2011)	MTV	Spun-off from Liquid Television. Created by Mike Judge, creator of King of the Hill.
The Head	Eric Fogel	December 19, 1994	March 1, 1996	Fogelmania Productions	MTV	
The Maxx	Original character: Sam Kieth; Series: Sam Kieth; Bill Messner-Loebs	April 8, 1995	June 19, 1995	Image Comics; IDW Publishing	MTV	Based on the comic book series of the same name.
Æon Flux	Peter Chung	August 8, 1995	October 10, 1995	Colossal Pictures; Mook Animation; Luk Film	MTV	Spun-off from Liquid Television.
Daria	Glenn Eichler; Susie Lewis	March 3, 1997	June 25, 2001	Heyday Media	MTV	Spun-off from Beavis and Butt-Head.
Cartoon Sushi	Danny Antonucci; Keith Alcorn; Eric Calderon	October 17, 1997	June 23, 1998	A.k.a. Cartoon; DNA Productions	MTV	
Celebrity Deathmatch	Eric Fogel; Gordon Barnett	May 14, 1998; June 10, 2006	October 20, 2002; March 30, 2007	Fogelmania Productions; The Comedy Company (2006–2007); Cuppa Coffee Studios (2006–2007)	MTV (1998–2002); MTV2 (2006–2007)	
Station Zero	Tramp Daly	March 8, 1999	April 6, 1999	Possible Worlds; C-Traze Studios; Upfront Entertainment	MTV	First MTV weekday cartoon
Phred on Your Head Show	Amy Friedman	July 26, 1999	March 31, 2002	Noggin LLC; Tricky Pictures; Possible Worlds	Noggin	Animated for MTV's sister channel, Noggin.
Downtown	Chris Prynoski	August 3, 1999	November 8, 1999		MTV	
2000s
Shrimpton O'Small		2000			N/A	Unaired pilot for Nickelodeon
The URL with Phred Show	Amy Friedman	September 10, 2001	March 31, 2002		Noggin	Animated for MTV's sister channel, Noggin.
Spy Groove	Michael Gans; Richard Register; Kevin Thomsen	June 26, 2000	July 13, 2002		MTV	
Fish 'N' Clips		September 29, 2000			VH1	Pilot
Undergrads	Pete Williams; Josh A. Cagan	April 1, 2001	August 12, 2001	Decode Entertainment; Funbag Animation	Teletoon; MTV	First MTV cartoon co-produced with Teletoon.
3-South	Mark Hentemann; Steve Callaghan	November 7, 2002	January 3, 2003	Hentemann Films; Warner Bros. Television Animation	MTV	
Where My Dogs At?	Aaron Matthew Lee; Jeff Ross	June 10, 2006	July 29, 2006	Enough With The Bread Already Productions; 6 Point Harness; Bardel Entertainment	MTV2	
The Adventures of Chico and Guapo	Orlando Jones; P. J. Pesce; Paul D'Acri	June 10, 2006	July 29, 2006	MTV Remote Productions; One Red Room	MTV2	
Friday: The Animated Series	Ice Cube; Jay Dyer	June 24, 2007	July 8, 2007	New Line Television; Cube Vision	MTV2	Adapted from the Friday film series.
MTV Entertainment Studios
2020s
South Park	Trey Parker; Matt Stone	September 30, 2020	present	South Park Studios; Comedy Partners	Comedy Central	Originally started in 1997.
Fairview	Stephen Colbert; R.J. Fried	March 9, 2022	March 30, 2022	Spartina Productions; Licht Media Solutions; RJ Fried Worldwide; Late Night Cartoons, Inc. CBS Studios	Comedy Central	
Beavis and Butt-Head	Mike Judge	August 4, 2022	present	Judgmental Films; 3 Arts Entertainment; Titmouse, Inc.	Paramount+ (2022–2023); Comedy Central (2025–present)	
Clone High	Phil Lord and Christopher Miller; Bill Lawrence	May 23, 2023	February 1, 2024	Doozer; Lord Miller Productions; ShadowMachine	Max	

Other MTV animated series

Title	Creator/Developer(s)	Premiere date	Finale date	Co-production with	Network	Note(s)
1980s
Stevie and Zoya	Joe Horne	1987	1989		MTV	
1990s
Liquid Television	Japhet Asher	June 2, 1991; May 15, 2014	March 6, 1994; June 12, 2014	Original series: (Colossal) Pictures; BIG Pictures; Noyes & Laybourne Enterprises; BBC Enterprises; Revival series: Titmouse, Inc.	MTV	Revived for the internet in 2014.
The Brothers Grunt	Danny Antonucci; Dennis Heaton	August 15, 1994	April 9, 1995	a.k.a. Cartoon	MTV	Created by Danny Antonucci, creator of Ed, Edd n Eddy. First MTV cartoon to feature a theme song vocalist.
2000s
Clone High	Phil Lord and Christopher Miller; Bill Lawrence	November 2, 2002	April 13, 2003	Doozer; Lord Miller Productions; Touchstone Television (season 1); Nelvana (season 1); MTV Entertainment Studios; ShadowMachine (seasons 2–3)	MTV; Teletoon	Second MTV cartoon co-produced with Teletoon.
Video Mods	Tony Shiff	September 16, 2004	July 22, 2005	Big Bear Entertainment; IBC Entertainment	MTV2	First animated show for MTV2
Wonder Showzen	Vernon Chatman; John Lee	March 11, 2005	May 19, 2006	USA Cable Entertainment (season 1); Augenblick Studios (animated segments); PFFR Productions	MTV2	
DJ & the Fro	Dave Jeser; Matt Silverstein	June 15, 2009	July 2, 2009	Titmouse, Inc. Double Hemm; MTV Production Development	MTV	Second MTV weekday cartoon
Popzilla	R.J. Fried; Tim Hedrick; Jared Miller; Kevin Pedersen; Dave Thomas	September 27, 2009	October 16, 2009	Animax Entertainment; MTV Production Development	MTV	
2010s
Good Vibes	David Gordon Green; Brad Ableson; Mike Clements	October 27, 2011	December 29, 2011	Werner Entertainment; Rough House Pictures; Not the QB Pro. Six Point Harness; Good Humor Television; Warner Horizon Television; MTV Production Development	MTV	
Greatest Party Story Ever		January 14, 2016	December 22, 2016	Four Peaks Media Group; Den of Thieves; ShadowMachine	MTV	

=== Theatrical films ===
Title	Director	Release date	Distributor	Co-production with	Note(s)
Beavis and Butt-Head Do America	Mike Judge	December 20, 1996	Paramount Pictures	Geffen Pictures; Judgemental Films	MTV's first and, so far, only theatrically released animated feature to date.

=== Streaming service original films ===
Title	Director	Release date	Distributor	Co-production with	Note(s)
South Park: Post Covid	Trey Parker	November 25, 2021	Paramount+	South Park Studios	
South Park: Post Covid: The Return of Covid	Trey Parker	December 16, 2021	Paramount+	South Park Studios	
South Park: The Streaming Wars	Trey Parker	June 1, 2022	Paramount+	South Park Studios	
Beavis and Butt-Head Do the Universe	John Rice; Albert Calleros	June 23, 2022	Paramount+	Judgemental Films; Titmouse, Inc. 3 Arts Entertainment	Sequel to Beavis and Butt-Head Do America.
South Park: The Streaming Wars Part 2	Trey Parker	July 13, 2022	Paramount+	South Park Studios	
South Park: Joining the Panderverse	Trey Parker	October 27, 2023	Paramount+	South Park Studios	
South Park (Not Suitable for Children)	Trey Parker	December 20, 2023	Paramount+	South Park Studios	
South Park: The End of Obesity	Trey Parker	May 24, 2024	Paramount+	South Park Studios	

=== Television films ===
Title	Director	Release date	Distributor	Co-production with	Note(s)
Daria: Is It Fall Yet?	Glenn Eichler; Peggy Nicoll	August 27, 2000	CBS Media Ventures	Heyday Media	Based on Daria.
Daria: Is It College Yet?	Karen Disher	January 21, 2002	CBS Media Ventures	Heyday Media	Based on Daria.
