= List of Celebrity Deathmatch episodes =

This is the list of all of the episodes and fights in the MTV claymation series Celebrity Deathmatch. Bolded fighters' names are the winners.

== Series overview ==
Season	Episodes	Originally released		
Season	Episodes	First released	Last released	Network
Pilots	2	January 1, 1998	January 25, 1998	MTV
1	12	May 14, 1998	October 22, 1998	MTV
2	21	January 31, 1999	November 11, 1999	MTV
3	25	January 27, 2000	February 11, 2001	MTV
4	19	July 22, 2001	June 6, 2002	MTV
5	8	June 10, 2006	July 29, 2006	MTV2
6	8	February 8, 2007	March 29, 2007	MTV2

== Episodes ==
=== Pilot episodes (1998) ===
Title	Fight 1	Fight 2	Fight 3	Original release date
"Charles Manson vs. Marilyn Manson"	Charles Manson vs. **Marilyn Manson**	N/A	N/A	January 1, 1998
Marilyn Manson pulls Charles Manson's skeleton out through his mouth ("The Tahitian Skeleton Pull of Death"). Also featuring Marv Albert.
"Deathbowl '98"	Kathie Lee Gifford vs. **Howard Stern**	**Pamela Anderson** vs. RuPaul	Spice Girls vs. Hanson	January 25, 1998
Fight 1: Howard Stern releases his corrosive flatulence on Kathie Lee Gifford, causing her skin to melt. Fight 2: Pam Anderson shoves RuPaul's shoe through his eye socket. Also featuring Marv Albert (guest commentator). Fight 3: Both Hanson and The Spice Girls are crushed by the light rigging after Marilyn Manson cuts through the supports with a chainsaw. His motive for doing this is explained in a pre-fight interview from earlier in the episode, in which Manson expresses his dislike for both bands.

=== Season 1 (1998) ===
No. overall	No. in season	Title	Fight 1	Fight 2	Fight 3	Original release date
1	1	"Seinfeld's Last Stand"	Hillary Clinton vs. Monica Lewinsky	**Mariah Carey** vs. Jim Carrey	**Tim Allen** vs. Jerry Seinfeld	May 14, 1998
Fight 1: Bill Clinton accidentally tells Paula Jones to "Grab [my] nuts" through Stacy Cornbred's microphone so he can have the peanuts he ordered earlier. This is misunderstood by both combatants, who turn on him. Bill then flees the arena in a Secret Service helicopter. Gennifer Flowers is accidentally hit in the face with Monica's trap-bladed beret thrown at Hillary. Featuring Bill Clinton, Paula Jones and Gennifer Flowers. Fight 2: Jim Carrey's head explodes when Mariah Carey sings and holds a very high note, much to the displeasure of every spectator and arena staff. Featuring Drew Carey. Fight 3: Tim and Jerry both fight poorly throughout the entire fight until Jerry's co-stars, who are spectators, get into the ring and kill Jerry, feeling that he betrayed them all by ending Seinfeld. Mills Lane accidentally throws a wrench at Don King's head. Featuring Jason Alexander, Julia Louis-Dreyfus, and Michael Richards. Note: This episode aired the same night as the series finale of NBC's Seinfeld.
2	2	"Where is Stallone?"	Rosie O'Donnell vs. Oprah Winfrey	Liam Gallagher vs. Noel Gallagher	Arnold Schwarzenegger vs. **Sylvester Stallone**	May 21, 1998
Fight 1: Jerry Springer interferes with both combatants, causing a double disqualification and challenges the two for a match individually, postponing the fight to a later date. A popcorn vendor is crushed when Oprah accidentally knocks down a spotlight on top of him. Fight 2: Both Liam's and Noel Gallagher's heads are smashed by **Gallagher's** mallet. Fight 3: In a bizarre twist, both fighters punch and knock each other out, prompting referee Mills Lane to count them out. Arnold Schwarzenegger manages to stand up, but Sylvester Stallone sweep-kicks him to the floor and then stands up himself. Mills then declares Sylvester the winner. Arnold Schwarzenegger flicks a cigar into the audience that lands in Don King's hair, which sets him on fire and eventually burns him alive. Also featuring Adrian Zmed.
3	3	"The Mystery of the Loch Ness Monster"	Bigfoot vs. **Loch Ness Monster**	**Mick Jagger** vs. Steven Tyler	David Letterman vs. Jay Leno	May 28, 1998
Fight 1: Bigfoot is sliced in half by the Loch Ness Monster's tail 6 seconds into the match. Don King is sliced in half by Loch Ness Monster's tail, and several audience members are crushed and eaten by the Loch Ness Monster. Also featuring Fran Drescher, Sean Connery, Mike Tyson, Pauly Shore and Carrot Top. Fight 2: Mick Jagger stabs Steven Tyler through the chest with his gigantic tongue. Also featuring Liv Tyler. Fight 3: The fight takes place in an electrified steel cage. Both David Letterman and Jay Leno are crushed by the electrocuted Loch Ness Monster and the electric fence. Also featuring Johnny Carson (as a guest referee, mysteriously disappears after beginning the fight), Loch Ness Monster, Fran Drescher and Ed McMahon.
4	4	"Celebrity Deathmatch Goes to the Movies"	Roger Ebert vs. **Gene Siskel**	**Dean Martin** vs. Jerry Lewis	Spike Lee vs. Quentin Tarantino	June 11, 1998
Fight 1: Both fighters are forced to fight with their right thumbs tied together. Siskel spins Ebert around by his thumb until the finger binds that hold their thumbs together break, sending Ebert flying into the support beam of the commentator's booth, splitting his skull in half. When Ebert hits the commentator's booth, Nick Diamond is thrown from the booth and put into a coma. Also featuring Spike Lee and Quentin Tarantino. Fight 2: The first fight from the Deathmatch Vault, set in the 1960s. Jerry Lewis is whacked out of the ring by Dean Martin. Also featuring Frank Sinatra and Sammy Davis Jr. Fight 3: Spike Lee's neck is broken after guest referee **Woody Allen** karate chops him in the throat. Quentin Tarantino's ribcage is ripped out by Woody Allen. Also featuring Soon-Yi Previn. Note: This is the first episode where all three fights have a winner.
5	5	"Nick in a Coma"	Cindy Crawford vs. Janeane Garofalo	Elvis Presley vs. Jerry Garcia	Jerry Springer vs. Rosie O'Donnell vs. **Oprah Winfrey**	July 23, 1998
Fight 1: Both fighters knock each other out, and Mills Lane calls the match a draw. Both fighters decide on forfeits prior to the match, which both have to abide by. Also featuring Jack Nicholson (guest commentator replacing Nick Diamond throughout this episode). Fight 2: This fight is a morphine-induced dream Nick Diamond has when Nicky Jr. is trying to call a nurse. The dream simply ends with both fighters punching each other. Also featuring Stacy Cornbred and Jimi Hendrix as a guest referee. Fight 3: The fight takes place in the Dome of Devastation. Jerry Springer is ripped in half like a wishbone by Oprah Winfrey and Rosie O'Donnell. Rosie is diced up into cubes as Oprah shoves her through the Dome of Devastation. Also featuring Leonardo DiCaprio who challenges Nicholson to a match.
6	6	"Nick Returns"	Fiona Apple vs. **John Popper**	**Christopher Walken** vs. Gary Oldman	Garth Brooks vs. **Marilyn Manson**	July 30, 1998
Fight 1: Fiona Apple is rolled over by John Popper and flattened. Also featuring Lenny Stanton, the executive producer's son as a guest commentator replacing Nick Diamond. Fight 2: Gary Oldman's head is crushed in Christopher Walken's hands. Fight 3: Garth Brooks' brain falls out after Marilyn Manson blows the top of his head off with his guitar. All three members of Hanson are sliced to pieces by a chainsaw held by Zac Hanson while attempting to crush Marilyn Manson like he did with them by cutting down the rafters.
7	7	"Presented by Big Bull Beer"	**Aretha Franklin** vs. Barbra Streisand	Bill Gates vs. Michael Flatley	Leonardo DiCaprio vs. **Jack Nicholson**	August 6, 1998
Fight 1: The first "Battle of the Devastating Divas". Both contestants fight with medieval weaponry. Barbra Streisand melts after drinking a bucket of water that Aretha Franklin contaminated with the bubonic plague. Fight 2: Bill and Michael are pitted against each other because of a clerical error, since they have no rivalry of sort. A robot version of Michael Flatley (built by Gates) slams both Flatley and Gates into the ring until they break into pieces. Fight 3: Jack Nicholson slams Leo's face into the turnbuckle until his face caves into his skull. However, Leo survives the attack. A riot ensues when female DiCaprio fans see what Jack has done to Leo's face.
8	8	"The Missing Girl"	Puff Daddy vs. Trent Reznor	**David Hasselhoff** vs. John Tesh	Bruce Willis and **Demi Moore** vs. Tom Cruise and **Nicole Kidman**	August 13, 1998
Fight 1: Trent Reznor is sliced to bits by vinyl records thrown by Puff Daddy. Puff Daddy is sliced to bits by Trent Reznor's projectile "Nine Inch Nails" (fingernails). Mills Lane later puts the pieces together in an amalgamation of both musicians. Fight 2: Both fighters are given the chance to choose a setting of how the ring would look for the fight by a coin toss. John wants the set of Entertainment Tonight, while David wants a Baywatch-like setting. In the end, Hasselhoff wins and gets a ring set up to look like a beach. John Tesh is crushed by KITT when David Hasselhoff asks him for help after his face gets torn off. David Hasselhoff's face and skull are ripped off when John Tesh unfolds an umbrella in his head. He collapses on top of KITT after the fight. Also featuring Sylvester Stallone, Arnold Schwarzenegger, David Spade and Steven Seagal. Fight 3: **Stone Cold Steve Austin** slams Tom Cruise's and Bruce Willis' heads together when they pull on the missing girl's arms to see who gets to save her. In the end, Austin not only gets credit for saving the missing girl but also impresses Kidman and Moore who both leave their crushed husbands for him.
9	9	"Fandemonium I"	**Stone Cold Steve Austin** vs. Vince McMahon	**Chris Rock** vs. Adam Sandler	Carmen Electra vs. **Jenny McCarthy**	August 20, 1998
Fight 1: Vince McMahon is hit with the Stone Cold Stunner, which breaks his neck. Austin then beats the corpse to pieces with The Undertaker's tombstone gift, then throws the pieces into a casket, which is dragged out into a field and set on fire offscreen due to Austin's playing to the crowd. Fight 2: Both fighters refuse to fight, much to the displeasure of the fans. Mills Lane turns on the Fan of Fandemonium, a giant razor-bladed fan, which slowly descends into the ring until there is a winner or both fighters are sliced to pieces. Chris Rock does a Mexican liver punch and throws Adam Sandler outside the ring, impaling him on the control lever of the Fan of Fandemonium control panel, which then electrocutes him. After winning, security still wouldn't allow Rock to escape the ring, so he is chopped up by the Fan of Fandemonium as it malfunctioned. In Season 5, it shows that Chris Rock and Adam Sandler are both alive after their match. Fight 3: The contestants fight in a ring full of mud while wearing tiny bikinis, per fans' requests. Howard Stern, who is the guest referee for the fight, tries to release his signature super fart move, which launches him as a missile into Carmen, causing Howard to grab Carmen Electra and crush her into a wall when they crash into it. Also featuring Gary Dell'Abate, Stern's producer.
10	10	"Battle of the Bulls"	**David Spade** vs. Steven Seagal	**Charles III** vs. Prince	**Michael Jordan** vs. Dennis Rodman	August 27, 1998
Fight 1: A grudge match. David Spade enrages Steven Seagal during the "Missing Girl" episode and challenges him to a fight. Spade uses the waistband of his underwear as a slingshot to shoot one of Scottie Pippen's NBA championship rings through Seagal's head. Also featuring Spike Lee. Fight 2: Prince Charles smashes Prince's head into his body with a croquet mallet. Also featuring Elizabeth II. Fight 3: The fighters are provided with basketballs to attack each other. Michael Jordan stuffs a basketball into Dennis Rodman's mouth and slam dunks him into a garbage can.
11	11	"37th Annual Sci-Fi Fight Night"	Celine Dion vs. Keith Flint	Zatar the Alien vs. **Nick Diamond**	**David Duchovny and Gillian Anderson** vs. Tommy Lee Jones and Will Smith	October 15, 1998
Fight 1: This fight wasn't planned. Celine Dion is singing the national anthem when Keith Flint attacks her from behind. Keith's head is ripped off and eaten by Celine, who then reveals herself to be **Zatar the Alien**. Zatar possesses Don King, causing him to faint after Zatar delivers a message through him. Fight 2: This fight also wasn't planned. It's a Sci-Fi Q&A segment with Peter Mayhew and Mark Hamill until Zatar kills them, enraging Nick to leave the booth and end Zatar's disruptive behavior. Two security guards accidentally shock each other while trying to stun Zatar with stun rods, who is dancing on the head of a catatonic Don King. Mark Hamill's and Peter Mayhew's heads are repeatedly slammed into the canvas by Zatar until both of them explode. Nick Diamond shoves his hand through Zatar's eyeball and pulls out his brain. Fight 3: The actors are dressed in their respective roles in sci-fi: The X-Files and Men in Black. Will Smith accidentally vaporizes himself and Tommy Lee Jones after holding a ray gun backwards.
12	12	"Masters of the Martial Arts"	Roseanne Barr vs. **Kelsey Grammer**	**Brandy Norwood** vs. Courtney Love	**Jackie Chan** vs. Jean-Claude Van Damme	October 22, 1998
Fight 1: After being pinned under Roseanne for two rounds, Kelsey escapes the pin by slipping out of his own skin. Roseanne has a heart attack when she sees Kelsey's skinless body and promptly dies. Fight 2: Courtney Love is mauled to pieces by an angry mama bear when Brandy tries to give Courtney its cub as a peace offering. Fight 3: Jean-Claude Van Damme, thinking guest referee Chuck Norris is his opponent, kicks him cleanly in half through his waist and proclaims himself the winner. He is later reprimanded by Mills Lane who furiously reveals that he's supposed to be fighting Jackie Chan and not Norris. Jackie Chan rips the arms off of Chuck Norris's corpse and decapitates Jean-Claude with them.

=== Season 2 (1999) ===
No. overall	No. in season	Title	Fight 1	Fight 2	Fight 3	Original release date
13	1	"Deathbowl '99"	Dolly Parton vs. **Jennifer Lopez**	Michael Jackson vs. **Madonna**	**Evander Holyfield** vs. Mike Tyson	January 31, 1999
Fight 1: Both combatants fight with special armor that could enlarge their body parts at will. Dolly's enlarged her breasts and Jennifer's enlarged her butt. Dolly Parton floats into space and explodes after her breasts are over-inflated by her breast enlarging armor. Featuring Michael Buffer and Ruth Westheimer (as a guest commentator). Fight 2: Michael Jackson turns himself into a hamster using Moonwalker magic and gets kicked into the pool of acid by Madonna. This fight wasn't planned. It is a performance by Madonna when Michael Jackson interrupted. The fight takes place in a ring surrounded by a pool of hydrochloric acid. Fight 3: Mike Tyson pushes Evander Holyfield off of the roof of a condemned building into a TNT plunger placed by a nearby demo team. Tyson is blown to pieces as the building comes down. The fight has spilled outside of the Deathmatch Arena into a hotel, a tavern and a rooftop of an evicted apartment complex.
14	2	"Battle of the Boys with Toys"	**Ice Cube** vs. Ice-T	Al Pacino vs. **Robert De Niro**	Backstreet Boys vs. **Beastie Boys**	February 4, 1999
Fight 1: Featuring Vanilla Ice. The ring is turned into an ice skating rink, completing the "Better Ice" theme. Ice Cube freezes after falling beneath the ice rink. He is later unfrozen after his ice block that was hanging on a crane crushes Vanilla Ice, who rushes into the arena and runs over Ice-T with an ice resurfacer. Fight 2: The first "Actor's Showcase Showdown". Both contestants fight while playing characters from their movies. Al Pacino's head is destroyed after being whacked repeatedly with Nelson de la Rosa when De Niro is still in his Al Capone character. Featuring Marlon Brando (as a guest referee) and Nelson de la Rosa. Fight 3: The bands fight each other in giant mech robots. Howie Dorough's face is blasted off by a laser beam from the Beastie Boys' robot. Marlon Brando is shoved into the Backstreet Boys' robot's exhaust pipe by the Beastie Boys. The Backstreet Boys are crushed inside their robot's cockpit when the Beastie Boys launched a fist rocket at their robot.
15	3	"Magic, Flashbacks and Pregnancies"	Calista Flockhart vs. **Lucy Lawless**	**Boy George** vs. Don Johnson	Penn & **Teller** vs. Siegfried & **Roy**	February 11, 1999
Fight 1: The fight takes place in a ring with office props from Ally McBeal while Lucy fights dressed as Xena. Calista launches herself from the ropes to attack Lucy, but Lucy ducks, causing Calista's head to get crammed inside Lucy's rectum. Lucy slams herself into the canvas from a turn post, trapping Calista inside herself until after the main event, when Calista is birthed out of Lucy Lawless alive. Featuring Maya Angelou and Dennis Franz. Fight 2: This fight is from a video found in a time capsule (dating back to 1985) after digging through the rubble from the previous episode's main event. Guest referee Ronald Reagan, believing Boy George is a woman, attacks Don Johnson to prevent him from harming Boy George any further. Johnson refuses to back down, so Reagan stuns him with a blow to the neck and then jumps off the turnbuckle onto Don's head, crushing his head & causing his brains to leaks out. Ruhollah Khomeini is disintegrated by a laser from Reagan's "Star Wars" satellite defense program. Also featuring Philip Michael Thomas, Cyndi Lauper, and Mr. T. Fight 3: Both teams are allowed to use magic tricks. Penn Jillette pulls Roy's brain out, but Siegfried charms it back into his head. Teller launches himself from a missile launcher and blows Siegfried up on contact. Roy's white tiger eats Penn.
16	4	"The Time Machine"	Jennifer Aniston vs. Courteney Cox vs. Lisa Kudrow	Sean Connery vs. **Roger Moore**	**Mahatma Gandhi** vs. Genghis Khan	February 18, 1999
Fight 1: A plywood sitcom set is constructed in the ring. David Schwimmer (actor of the NBC sitcom) is launched from an ejection seat on a couch and into the sitcom set wall. He, as well as Courteney Cox, Jennifer Aniston and Lisa Kudrow, are crushed when the set collapsed. Featuring James Caan, Matt LeBlanc, and Matthew Perry. Fight 2: The two combatants are allowed to use gadgets from the James Bond films. Roger Moore borrows a giant boulder from a cave woman and crushes Sean Connery under it. Fight 3: The two fighters' personalities are switched around due to a malfunction in the Time Machine, making Gandhi stronger and Genghis Khan weaker. Mahatma Gandhi tosses Genghis Khan under the ring and crushes him with it. This is the first episode where the Time Machine is used.
17	5	"The Unknown Murderer"	Moses vs. Ramesses II	**Geraldo Rivera** vs. Larry King	**Neve Campbell** vs. **Sarah Michelle Gellar**	February 25, 1999
Fight 1: This fight is a bedtime story that Nick makes up for Nicky Jr. Ramesses II impales Moses on a tiny pyramid. **Harrison Ford** knocks Pharaoh out of the ring. Moses crushes Ramesses II's henchmen with The Ten Commandments. Featuring God as a guest referee. Fight 2: Viewers can call the fighters in this bout to tell them what they want to do to their opponent, a format similar to Larry King Live. Drew Barrymore's face is smashed in by the mystery killer. Larry King is crushed under a desk by Geraldo. Jamie Lee Curtis is slashed to death by the mystery killer. Fight 3: Jennifer Love Hewitt is slashed to death by the mystery killer. Midway through the fight, the mystery killer attempts a phone call, which Nick then traced back. Sarah and Neve find that the ringing is coming from the platypus mascot (later revealed to be an actual platypus), and start to beat him up.
18	6	"Celebrity Deathmatch International"	**Mel Gibson** vs. Paul Hogan	Antonio Banderas vs. **Cheech Marin**	Bono vs. **Fabio Lanzoni** vs. Yoko Ono	March 4, 1999
Fight 1: This fight is taped in an arena in Sydney, AU. Paul Hogan is impaled with a sharpened pole by Gibson and is then tossed onto a barbecue grill to get fried. Natalie Imbruglia is decapitated by a boomerang that Paul throws at Mel. Fight 2: This fight is taped in an arena in Havana, Cuba. Guest referee Fidel Castro's intestines fall out after Antonio Banderas blindly cuts him up. Antonio Banderas is repeatedly whacked like a piñata until his insides fall out. Featuring Andrés Cantor as a guest commentator. Fight 3: This fight is taped in an arena in The Hague, Europe. Bono's head is crushed by Yoko Ono's statue. Yoko Ono is crushed in a folding couch by Fabio. Andrés Cantor is knocked out of the commentator booth by Johnny when he becomes too irritating.
19	7	"The End of the Real World"	Tyra Banks vs. Claudia Schiffer vs. Kate Moss	Busta Rhymes vs. **William Shakespeare**	Jacinda Barrett vs. **Jon Brennan** vs. David "Puck" Rainey vs. Tami Roman	March 11, 1999
Fight 1: This fight is actually supposed to be a fashion show of deadly clothes. Tyra Banks, Claudia Schiffer, and Kate Moss rip each other apart until all three are left as hideously deformed, yet still walking clumps. Fight 2: Hip-hop rapper Busta Rhymes runs into the time machine and is transported back to Shakespeare's time, making Shakespeare the winner by default. After the match finishes, Busta Rhymes directs A Midsummer Night's Dream. Fight 3: The ring is set up like a house from The Real World. Jacinda Barrett is beaten to death after being voted off. Tami Roman's head is crushed by Puck's bicycle. David "Puck" Rainey is thrown off his bike into a tank of piranhas, which tear him apart.
20	8	"Celebrity Deathmatch The Motion Picture"	Martin Scorsese vs. Oliver Stone	**Groucho Marx** vs. John Wayne	Cameron Diaz vs. **Meryl Streep**	April 22, 1999
Fight 1: The fighters fight to see who would direct the Celebrity Deathmatch movie. Martin Scorsese is decapitated by Oliver Stone's director's slate. Oliver Stone is impaled through the eye by a camera that falls from a helicopter. Fight 2: The second fight from the Deathmatch Vault, taped in the 1950s. Both contestants are allowed to use props from their movies. Groucho uses comedy slapstick material and Wayne uses cowboy tools. John Wayne's head gets sliced after he was kicked into Harpo Marx's harp by Groucho. Also featuring Chico Marx. Fight 3: This fight is supposed to be acted out and staged with Streep as the loser, but Streep takes her role too seriously, knocking Cameron Diaz down with a boom mike and then electrocutes her with it.
21	9	"Cable Day"	Emeril Lagasse vs. **Two Fat Ladies**	Jesse Camp vs. **Matt Pinfield**	Pat Sajak vs. Alex Trebek	May 6, 1999
Fight 1: Each fighter is supposed to make a meal out of their opponent so Mills Lane can eat it. Emeril Lagasse is cooked like a roast turkey. Fight 2: Jesse Camp's idiosyncratic speech and voice cause Mills Lane to believe that Jesse has brain damage. Mills "euthanizes" him by hitting an elbow drop on his neck, breaking it. Featuring Monica. Fight 3: The fighters fight in a game show-like deathmatch with elements from Jeopardy! and Wheel of Fortune. Alex Trebek is repeatedly crushed to death when he is forced into a compactor device adorned with spikes whenever he answers his questions incorrectly. Pat Sajak is sliced up by the rapidly spinning wheel after he is lowered into it after incorrectly guessing the Puzzle of Punishment phrase.
22	10	"4th of July Celebration"	**Bill Clinton** vs. Ken Starr	James Van Der Beek vs. Saddam Hussein	**Abraham Lincoln** vs. George Washington	July 1, 1999
Fight 1: A special device is placed in the arena to determine how popular the fighters are with the crowd throughout the match. Ken Starr's arms are removed and he gets thrown into the Liberty Bell, smashing his head. Featuring Hillary Clinton. Fight 2: Bill Clinton dies after eating Saddam's burgers, which are infected with mad cow disease. Saddam Hussein is wrapped in the American flag and beaten to death with a flag pole. After killing Saddam, James Van Der Beek is arrested for desecrating an American flag, making the fight a no contest. Fight 3: Theodore Roosevelt decapitates Richard Nixon with a metal stick because Nixon is spying on him and Lincoln with a reel-to-reel audio recorder, in reference to the Watergate scandal. George Washington's body is blown up by fireworks. After Lincoln is declared the winner, both Lincoln and Theodore Roosevelt are decapitated by some loose fireworks in the arena.
23	11	"Family Night I"	**Charlie Sheen** vs. Emilio Estevez	Donny and Marie Osmond vs. **Eric and Julia Roberts**	**Jerry** and Ben Stiller vs. Bob and Jakob Dylan	July 8, 1999
Fight 1: Emilio Estevez hires some prostitutes to distract Charlie while fighting. When the prostitutes are about to kill Charlie, they ask Emilio for their pay. When Emilio can't pay them in cash, they rip him apart. Featuring Sid Figgle (Johnny's brother-in-law). Fight 2: Donny and Marie Osmond argue during the match after Donny uses profane language. Their argument ends with both of them chewing each other's heads off (The Mormon Munch). Fight 3: Jerry Stiller screams into Jakob Dylan's ear, causing his brain to explode. Bob Dylan electrocutes Ben Stiller using a lightning blast from a special suit he wears that allows him to manipulate electric currents while plugged into an electric socket. Jerry Stiller electrocutes Sid Figgle by pushing him onto the electric Bob Dylan. Sid's belt buckle re-directs the electricity into Bob Dylan and kills him.
24	12	"Censoring Problems"	Ron Jeremy vs. **Tommy Lee**	**Alanis Morissette** vs. Jewel	**The Three Stooges** vs. The Three Tenors	July 15, 1999
Fight 1: The fighters wear rooster costumes in a mock "cock" fight in an underground dirt ring. Ron Jeremy is stabbed in the eye by Tommy Lee's erection. Fight 2: This fight is a ladder match with a giant sack of money hanging over the ring. Alanis drops a bag of money on Jewel, turning her into a hockey puck. Alanis then whacks her into the light rigging, electrocuting her. Fight 3: Moe Howard tosses Plácido Domingo into the time machine and uses it to quickly age Domingo until he turns into dust. Moe is impaled through the eye with a plunger handle. In an attempt to make himself younger using the time machine, Larry Fine accidentally turns back into a sperm cell. He dies after he launches himself into Luciano Pavarotti's eye. Curly Howard smashes José Carreras' face in with a reverse headbutt. Curly rips off Pavarotti's face.
25	13	"Salute to Laughter"	Carrot Top vs. **Dennis Miller**	**Rodney Dangerfield** vs. Don Rickles	Billy Crystal vs. **Whoopi Goldberg** vs. Robin Williams	July 22, 1999
Fight 1: Both comedians use their comedic shtick against each other. Dennis uses obscure pop-culture references with biting wit and Carrot Top uses his box of props. Carrot Top pops after being inflated and turned into a balloon animal. Stone Cold Steve Austin decapitates a comedian with a cane. Fight 2: This fight takes place in a ring with a giant grill in the middle, literally making it a celebrity "roast". Rodney Dangerfield punches Don Rickles until he is reduced to pieces and then cooks him on a grill. Another comedian is crushed by Stone Cold's ten-ton weight. Fight 3: This fight begins as a comedy act fund-raiser for the Celebrity Deathmatch Rehabilitation Clinic, where losing Deathmatch contestants are nursed back to health. Billy Crystal is decapitated by Robin Williams. Robin Williams is cut in half by Whoopi Goldberg. Joe Piscopo is shot to pieces by Stone Cold's fruit gun after he fails to entertain the crowd.
26	14	"The Laser Pointer"	Elton John vs. **Ozzy Osbourne**	Sandra Bernhard vs. **Martha Stewart**	**Tom Hanks** vs. Sean Penn	July 29, 1999
Fight 1: Ozzy Osbourne devours Elton John's head and attempts to swallow it. The head fails to go down his throat, so Queen Elizabeth II saves Ozzy by giving him the Heimlich maneuver. Fight 2: The ring is decorated like a house for Martha Stewart. Sandra Bernhard's intestines are removed using a disher and made into a Christmas ornament. Fight 3: Since Tom Hanks is so friendly and probably wouldn't fight, he is locked in a cage for six months and is tortured so he would become more fierce. This does not affect at all Tom's friendly nature. After Tom Hanks watches Sean Penn beat up a paparazzo, Tom gets angry because Sean doesn't allow a regular person to make a living and tears out Sean's spine and spleen.
27	15	"Robot Nicky"	**Gary Coleman** vs. Ricky Schroder	**Lauryn Hill** vs. Shania Twain	Hugh Grant vs. All Comers (Clint Eastwood, Harvey Keitel and **Andy Dick**)	August 5, 1999
Fight 1: Ricky Schroder's body parts are kicked from him, putting him at Gary Coleman's height. Coleman jumps on his stomach and launches his head off. After the fight, Sammo Hung comes down to the ring, challenging Dennis Franz to a fight. Fight 2: Lauryn Hill's corner is an actual street corner torn up from Newark, New Jersey and fashioned with street-related weapons, while Shania Twain's corner is decorated like a farm, complete with farm implements to be used as weapons. Shania Twain's brain is sucked out by a milking machine. Fight 3: Hugh Grant is on vacation with Nick, so they put robots in their place to fight and host. Clint Eastwood is turned to dust after Hugh Grant jumps on him. Harvey Keitel is smashed into a brick wall after being launched from the ropes. Andy Dick tears Hugh Grant's heart out, only to find that he is fighting a robot. Johnny rips out Robot Nick's heart when he becomes too annoying.
28	16	"The Prophecy"	**Dennis Franz** vs. Sammo Hung	**Chris Tucker** vs. Steven Wright	Gwyneth Paltrow vs. **Winona Ryder**	October 7, 1999
Fight 1: A grudge match (Franz's co-star, Ricky Schroder, was killed in a previous Deathmatch by Hung's student, Gary Coleman). Sammo Hung's arms and legs are removed and then crushed when Dennis Franz jumps from the turnbuckle. Fight 2: Steven Wright's intestines are pulled out through his mouth by Chris Tucker. Stone Cold Steve Austin snaps the neck of a giant moose with a Stone Cold Stunner. Fight 3: The fight takes place inside the Dome of Devastation with everyday house objects attached to the walls. Gwyneth Paltrow is sliced in half when Winona slams the dome shut on her waist while holding her half-inside and half-outside the dome. Stacey Cornbred spontaneously combusts following unexplained stomach pains that lasted throughout the episode.
29	17	"In the Memory of Stacey Cornbred"	**Bette Midler** vs. Cher	**Roberto Benigni** vs. Benito Mussolini	Nicolas Cage vs. **John Travolta**	October 14, 1999
Fight 1: The second "Battle of the Devastating Divas". The fighters are given roadway construction equipment to fight with. Bette Milder pours hot tar over Cher's body and then flattens her head with a steamroller. Featuring Minkie Laboosh. Fight 2: Benito Mussolini is impaled by Roberto Benigni when he accidentally shoots himself out of a tank cannon. Fight 3: The fighters in this fight have their faces and buttocks exchanged. John Travolta removes Nicolas Cage's buttocks from himself and repeatedly hits Cage's head with it. Travolta then takes back his own posterior.
30	18	"From the Streets of New York"	N/A	N/A	N/A	October 21, 1999
A clip show from the streets of New York City.
31	19	"Halloween Episode I"	**Frankenstein's monster** vs. Werewolf	**The Undertaker** vs. Captain Doody (Nicky Jr.)	**Kiss** vs. NSYNC	October 28, 1999
Fight 1: The ring is decorated with a graveyard theme. When the Wolf-Man turns back into a human, He attempts to disqualify Frankenstein by saying he is made up of dead body parts, so he is therefore already dead. Mills declares the Wolf Man the winner until Frankenstein crushes the Wolf-Man’s head. Featuring The Undertaker as a guest commentator. Fight 2: This fight wasn't planned. Captain Doody possesses Nicky Jr., and Nick cries out to the Undertaker for help. The Undertaker complies, claiming that "I'm the only evil guy on this show!" The Undertaker delivers his finishing move—the Tombstone Piledriver—to Captain Doody, ending his possession of Nicky Jr. Captain Doody flies out of Nicky Jr.'s body and into a nearby popcorn vendor. Featuring Bob Saget. Fight 3: Each contestant in this fight is wearing a costume with special powers. The members of Kiss dress up as themselves, while NSYNC go in gimmicky Halloween costumes. JC Chasez is blown up by Paul Stanley's eye laser so it would be a fair fight (Kiss has four members while NSYNC has five). While attempting to use a top-rope attack on Chris Kirkpatrick, Peter Criss falls off the turnbuckle and cracks his skull on the ring steps. Lance Bass is sliced deli-style by Paul Stanley's eye laser. Ace Frehley uses his signature move "Frehley's Comet" to flatten Justin Timberlake against the canvas by jumping with him off the turnbuckle. Frehley then uses his guitar as a raygun to disintegrate Timberlake's remains. Ace Freely knocks Joey Fatone out of the ring with his guitar. Gene Simmons tries to incinerate Chris Kirkpatrick with his fiery breath but Chris dodges the blast and hits Paul Stanley instead, completely incinerating him. Ace Frehley shoots balloons that Gene Simmons is tied to, who then falls and crushes Kirkpatrick.
32	20	"High-Tech Fighting"	**Billy Blanks** vs. Richard Simmons	Don King vs. **Donald Trump**	Brad Pitt vs. Keanu Reeves	November 4, 1999
Fight 1: Richard Simmons' head explodes after he is tied into a bow by Blanks. Fight 2: The ring for this fight is covered in gold, much to the delight of fans who steal parts of the ring during the fight. Don King is ripped in half after Trump jumps in his mouth. Fight 3: This fight takes place in a virtual reality arena in a homage to The Matrix. Keanu Reeves' head explodes when Brad Pitt beats on his brain after Brad is transported into Keanu's head. However, the computer explodes before Brad can be transported back into reality.
33	21	"Fandemonium II"	**Ben Affleck** vs. Matt Damon	**Ozzy Osbourne** vs. Rob Zombie	**Marilyn Manson** vs. Ricky Martin	November 11, 1999
Fight 1: The fighters are given 10 minutes before the match to build a killing machine using various metal bits and pieces. Both fighters are also allowed to reinvent the machine during the fight. Ben Affleck kicks Matt Damon into his automatic meat pulverizer, turning him into a raw beefcake. Kirk Fosnaugh's spleen is torn out by John Tesh. Fight 2: The fight takes place in a ring decorated with Satanic/Heavy Metal imagery. Ozzy Osbourne uses a skull splitter to crack open Rob Zombie's head and pulls out his brain. Ozzy then resurrects Rob as a zombie using backwards talking and Haitian Vodou magic. The zombified Rob Zombie continues to fight, but Ozzy attempts to destroy the zombie's brain by punting it into the air. Rob Zombie catches his brain but then spikes it to the floor in celebration, which finishes him off. Fight 3: This match is originally a rock performance by Marilyn Manson and his band performing "Astonishing Panorama of the Endtimes" until Ricky Martin interrupts, taking out two members of Manson's band. Ricky bites off one of Marilyn Manson's hands after Manson attempts his signature Tunisian Skeleton Grab on Ricky. The hand comes to life inside Ricky Martin's stomach and busts out through the top of his head.

=== Season 3 (2000–01) ===
No. overall	No. in season	Title	Fight 1	Fight 2	Fight 3	Original release date
34	1	"Deathbowl 2000"	**Andre Agassi** vs. Tiger Woods	**O. J. Simpson** vs. Joe Namath	Mark McGwire vs. **Sammy Sosa**	January 27, 2000
Fight 1: The ring is decorated like a tennis court, after the flipping of a gymnast to decide if it would be decorated as a tennis court or a golf course. Tiger Woods explodes after having dozens of tennis balls shot up into his rectum, intestines, and abdomen. Brooke Shields is run over by Andre Agassi's golf cart while being used by Tiger as a human shield. Featuring Geena Davis, Kerri Strug and Brooke Shields. Fight 2: The third fight from the Deathmatch Vault. The ring is filled with American football equipment. O. J. kicks Joe Namath, who is impaled on a goal post. O. J. then vows to find the real killer. Featuring Howard Cosell as a guest commentator. Fight 3: This fight is a home run derby, with the two competitors seeing how many of these opponent's bones they can destroy. Mark McGwire is decapitated with Sammy Sosa's baseball bat, and his removed head soon ends up crashing into a nearby scoreboard, causing various explosions.
35	2	"The New Employee"	Christina Aguilera vs. Britney Spears	**Flea** vs. Kenny G	**Anthony Edwards** vs. Eriq La Salle vs. Noah Wyle	February 3, 2000
Fight 1: The two pop stars have their hair tied together in a "Ponytail of Pain". Both performers tear each other apart, with no winner. Also featuring Debbie Matenopoulos, who replaces Stacy Cornbred as a correspondent. Fight 2: Kenny G's jaw is torn off by Flea and thrown in mid-air, which causes it to boomerang back into his head. Fight 3: The ring is partially decorated like an emergency room. Eriq La Salle screams into Noah Wyle's stethoscope causing the top of Wyle's head to explode. Eriq and Anthony perform a death operation, slashing Noah to pieces and crushing his chest before he eventually flat-lines. Edwards injects Eriq La Salle with an intravenous bag containing malaria, causing him to turn yellow and decompose while at the same time, releasing much toxic gas into the arena.
36	3	"Turn on Your TV Day"	Bryant Gumbel vs. **Katie Couric**	Judge Judy vs. **Mills Lane**	Craig Kilborn vs. **Tom Green**	February 10, 2000
Fight 1: Katie Couric tosses Bryant Gumbel through a window, and he is sliced into various pieces by its destroyed glass. The ring is decorated like the set of the Today Show. Emily Fingerhut is crushed with a sofa by Bryant Gumbel. Featuring Chet Zumditch, Emily Fingerhut and Willard Scott. Fight 2: Susan Lucci's (Judge Judy’s initial opponent) head is crushed inside a Bible before the fight even begins. Mills Lane shoves a lamp on Judge Judy while she is knocked into a chair, electrocuting her to death. The ring is decorated like a courtroom. Fight 3: Tom Green puts a megaphone in Craig Kilborn's mouth and screams, blowing out the back of his head.
37	4	"Freak Fights"	**Larry Flynt** vs. Hugh Hefner	**Cousin Grimm** vs. Pierce McCrack	Eminem vs. Kid Rock	February 17, 2000
Fight 1: Flynt runs Hefner down with his wheelchair. He then takes Hugh's flattened body and folds it into a magazine and rips him in half. Fight 2: Part one of the Freak Fight series. Cousin Grimm rips out Pierce McCrack's spinal column and impales him with it. Fight 3: The fight is called TRD (Total Request Dead) when viewers are allowed to call into both contestants and give shout-outs to their friends. After not acknowledging **Joe C.'**s efforts to help him win, Joe C. (using Eminem's body) jumps on Kid Rock, crushing his chest repeatedly. Carson Daly's innards are torn out by Joe C. Featuring Carson Daly as a guest referee.
38	5	"Celebrity Deathmatch's Salute to Hollywood"	Kevin Costner vs. **Kevin Smith**	**Kathy Bates** vs. Sharon Stone	**Alfred Hitchcock** vs. Steven Spielberg	February 24, 2000
Fight 1: Both fighters are given the choice of using a costume and weapons from their movies to fight their opponent with. Costner chooses The Postman, while Smith takes on as a fictional superhero from the View Askewniverse. Kevin Costner is eaten alive by a shark after getting put into a package and mailed to the Atlantic Ocean. Featuring Jason Mewes. Fight 2: Both contestants are allowed to use murder weapons from famous femme fatale movies. Sharon Stone uses a sledgehammer to knock Kathy Bates's foot off. The foot ricochets around the arena until finally, the sharp heel impales Sharon's forehead. Fight 3: Steven Spielberg brings the Ark of the Covenant into the ring and releases spirits from it to attack Alfred Hitchcock. The spirits turn on Spielberg and tear him apart because he didn't pay them for their appearances in Raiders of the Lost Ark.
39	6	"Congressional Hearings"	N/A	N/A	N/A	March 2, 2000
A clip show where Johnny, Nick, and Stone Cold Steve Austin argue about the show's violence before the United States Congress. Congress decides not to cancel the show, and Senator Ted Kennedy (the only one who wanted the show canceled) starts attacking the congressmen. Featuring Senators Maxine Waters, Daniel Patrick Moynihan, Trent Lott, Orrin Hatch, Phil Gramm, Richard Shelby and Strom Thurmond.
40	7	"Teen Night"	**Alyssa Milano** vs. Melissa Joan Hart	Mary-Kate Olsen vs. Ashley Olsen	Jennifer Love Hewitt and **Scott Wolf** vs. Reese Witherspoon and Ryan Phillippe	June 29, 2000
Fight 1: The two fighters are able to cast magic spells and have access to their own black cauldrons and broomsticks. Melissa Joan Hart is crushed by a stake pole. Tony Danza's face is ripped off by Salem Saberhagen. Fight 2: Mary-Kate and Ashley Olsen are torn to shreds by **Betty-Sue Olsen**, the 'third' Olsen twin. Fight 3: The ring is decorated as if for a senior prom. Jennifer Love Hewitt catapults Ryan Phillippe with a table to a disco ball hanging over the ring, then the disco ball is cut down and he lands on a table. Reese Witherspoon is sliced to pieces by the ropes after she is accidentally knocked into them by Scott Wolf. After the fight, when Jennifer is about to be crowned prom queen, Betty-Sue Olsen rips a rotisserie chicken out of Jennifer's stomach through her back.
41	8	"Sex, Lugs and Rock 'n' Roll"	Pamela Anderson vs. **Heather Locklear**	Axl Rose vs. **Slash**	**Dale Earnhardt** vs. Jeff Gordon	July 6, 2000
Fight 1: The two fighters are fighting for the life or death of Tommy Lee, who is suspended over a crate of hungry baby South Carolina tree monkeys. Pamela Anderson overuses her upgraded radioactive breasts on Heather Locklear. This causes them to malfunction and then explode Pamela to her death. Tommy Lee is eaten by a crate full of hungry baby tree monkeys after being lowered by Heather Locklear. Fight 2: After Axl scrambles Slash's brain with a cake mixer, Slash has the mental capacity of an 8-year-old. Axl is then cut up into paper dolls by Slash. Fight 3: Jeff Gordon is crushed under Dale Earnhardt's tire and ground to a pulp by his back tire. The fight is a demolition derby set in a dirt ring.
42	9	"Johnny & Debbie... In Love?"	Regis Philbin vs. **Chuck Woolery**	**Napoleon Bonaparte** vs. Joe Pesci	**Kevin Bacon** vs. All Comers (Meg Ryan, Martin Lawrence and Jesse Ventura)	July 13, 2000
Fight 1: The two fighters are contestants in a macabre game show. By answering questions correctly, one of the straps holding them in their chairs opens, allowing access to one weapon. Incorrect answers cause the remaining straps to tighten, eventually cutting off hands and feet. Regis Philbin's lungs are stabbed out after Chuck Woolery loses his hands and sharpens his arm stubs to points. Fight 2: The fighters are given toys as weapons, a play on their small statures. Napoleon puts his smelly rotten hand (which he keeps in his coat) into Joe Pesci's nose. He punches him repeatedly until his brains leak out of his ears. Napoleon then throws Pesci into a toybox, killing him. Fight 3: Meg Ryan is thrown into the audience and impaled on a sign. Martin Lawrence's head is crushed by Kevin Bacon after Mills declares him unfit to fight. Kevin Bacon punches a hole through Jesse Ventura's body, climbs into the hole, and tears him in half.
43	10	"Time Traveling"	**Nick Diamond** vs. Satyr	**Sherlock Holmes** vs. Jack the Ripper	Joan Rivers vs. **Melissa Rivers**	July 20, 2000
Fight 1: The match is fought in the ancient Roman Coliseum, which is overseen by Julius Caesar. Nick Diamond sticks a Roman candle in Satyr's rectum, which blows him to smithereens. Napoleon is stomped on and eaten by a T-rex prior to the first match. Fight 2: The match is fought in the darkened streets of 1880s London. Jack the Ripper is impaled by the knives hanging in his coat when Sherlock Holmes buttons it for him. Dr. Watson is stabbed, sliced in half, forced to eat a British meat pie and then decapitated by Jack the Ripper. Fight 3: Two closets are placed on opposite sides of the ring. The knot holding all of Joan Rivers's face-lifted skin is untied, causing most of her flesh to fall off.
44	11	"In the Head of Nicky Jr."	Rage Against the Machine vs. **The Machine**	**Al Gore** vs. "Weird Al" Yankovic	John Cusack vs. **John Malkovich**	July 27, 2000
Fight 1: After attempting to leave the fight before it even starts, Tim Commerford and Brad Wilk are sliced in half by the machine. Zack de la Rocha and Tom Morello are crushed and sliced to pieces. Their remains are both stuffed into jars afterward. Fight 2: This fight is planned to be the final fight of the evening, but since John Cusack and John Malkovich do not show up, this fight is put on instead. Al Gore sucks out "Weird Al" Yankovic's brain through a vacant eyehole. Fight 3: John Cusack is electrocuted by a nerve. The two combatants are fighting on top of Nicky Jr.'s brain.
45	12	"The Battle of the Heavy Metal Maniacs"	Beni Trauma vs. **Potato Khan**	Ernest Hemingway vs. **Mick Foley**	Fred Durst vs. **James Hetfield**	August 3, 2000
Fight 1: The second part of the Freak Fight series. Beni Trauma is decapitated and ripped to pieces by a mutated Potato Khan's tentacles. Potato Khan then cooks Trauma's head and feeds it to a kid celebrating his birthday. Fight 2: Mick Foley uses his sock puppet, Mr. Socko, and his signature move "the Mandible Claw", to tear off Ernest Hemingway's lower jaw. His brain, eyes and tongue fall to the floor. Fight 3: The two combatants are wearing steel plate armor, and the turnbuckles have electromagnets on them. Fred Durst is stuffed with metal objects via a vacuum cleaner (in reverse). Each object rips through him when the turnbuckle magnets turn on.
46	13	"Best of WWF"	N/A	N/A	N/A	October 1, 2000
A clip show of the fights involving wrestlers of the **World Wrestling Entertainment** starring Mick Foley (a.k.a. "Mankind"). Includes clips from The Undertaker vs. Captain Doody, Stone Cold Steve Austin vs. Vince McMahon, Mick Foley vs. Ernest Hemingway and Fred Durst vs. James Hetfield.
47	14	"The Prisoners"	**Bruce Springsteen** vs. James Gandolfini	Drew Barrymore vs. **Farrah Fawcett**	Christian Slater vs. **Robert Downey Jr.**	October 8, 2000
Fight 1: The participants fight using bathroom equipment such as urinals, toilets and blow dryers in order to see who would adopt a rest area on the New Jersey Turnpike. James Gandolfini is flushed down a high-powered toilet. Featuring Steven Van Zandt, as a guest referee. Van Zandt is ripped in half by Bruce Springsteen and James Gandolfini. Fight 2: Each fighter has a specific, animal-related fighting style. Barrymore uses "Giraffe-Style", while Fawcett uses "Dodo-Style". Drew Barrymore's neck stretches and snaps back, slicing her in half down the middle. Fight 3: The ring is decorated like a prison courtyard. Robert uses a meat slicer, which he smuggled into the ring, to grind Christian Slater to pieces turning him into pork chops.
48	15	"Courtney Love Returns"	Eddie Murphy vs. **Nick Nolte**	Macaulay Culkin vs. **Haley Joel Osment**	**Dave Grohl** & Billy Corgan vs. Courtney Love	October 15, 2000
Fight 1: Nick Nolte tears Eddie Murphy's heart out and shoves it in his mouth. When the fight starts, Murphy is nowhere to be seen so Nolte begins attacking random audience members in order to find him (a reference to Murphy often using heavy makeup in his film roles). Eventually, Murphy shows up, dressed as Nolte, which confuses him even more. Fight 2: The ring is decorated like a playground. Macaulay Culkin is torn apart by the ghosts of dead celebrities and then comes back as a ghost. Featuring Bruce Willis and the ghosts of various dead celebrities. Fight 3: The match takes place in the Dome of Devastation with musical instruments hanging from the top. Billy Corgan shows up late to the fight and gets his head caught in the Dome of Devastation as it's closing. Eventually, Corgan's head is crushed by the dome. Dave Grohl chews through a wire holding a self-playing piano to the roof of the Dome of Devastation, causing it to fall on top of Courtney Love.
49	16	"The Return of Lucy Lawless"	**David Arquette** vs. Paul Reiser	Michael Douglas vs. **Martin Sheen**	TLC vs. Dixie Chicks	October 22, 2000
Fight 1: The fighters are given different types of phones to use as weapons in reference to their numerous roles in phone-related advertisements. David Arquette puts several cell phones in Paul Reiser's head, and the radiation emitted from them causes his head to explode. Featuring Rosanna Arquette, Nicolas Cage & Courteney Cox as voice-only cameos and Lucy Lawless as a guest host for the episode. Fight 2: The ring is decorated like the Oval Office. Martin Sheen decapitates Michael Douglas with his own femur bone and then impales his head onto a microphone stand. Fight 3: The ring is decorated like a southern bar. Tionne "T-Boz" Watkins is sitting down on a table when Emily Strayer lands on it, sending the table sky high and it whacks her head off. Robison smashes through a mirror when she is catapulted by Lisa "Left-Eye" Lopes and bleeds to death. Martie Maguire throws alcohol bottles into Rozonda "Chilli" Thomas' mouth, then jumps on her head and her head is blown to pieces by the broken beer bottles. Lisa "Left-Eye" Lopes unties a chandelier that is above Martie Maguire and Natalie Maines, and when it falls it crushes Martie and blows Natalie to pieces. Lopes is hacked to pieces by Lucy Lawless upon trying to steal her trophy after the fight.
50	17	"Halloween Episode II"	**Brendan Fraser** vs. Mummy	Sarah Michelle Gellar vs. **Vampire**	Zombie Stacey Cornbred vs. **Debbie Matenopoulos**	October 29, 2000
Fight 1: This match wasn't planned. A zombie attack on the studio prevents any of the expected fighters from getting into the studio, making the planned fights impossible. After finding this out, Johnny is attacked by a mummy, and Brendan Fraser comes to his rescue, starting the match. One of the Mummy's bandages gets caught on an audience member's watch, causing the Mummy to unravel. Brendan hits him in the butt with a chair, causing the Mummy's spine to fly out through the top of his skull. Featuring various celebrities as attendees. Fight 2: This match also wasn't planned. The Vampire flies into the ring and demands to fight someone. Sarah Michelle Gellar steps up to the challenge. Sarah Michelle Gellar's blood is sucked out by the Vampire. Fight 3: This match also wasn't planned. Zombie Stacey Cornbred comes into the studio and tries to kill Debbie for stealing her job, starting the match. Zombie Stacey Cornbred is crammed through a small crack in a door by Debbie Matenopoulos. Her remains are eaten by other zombies.
51	18	"A Night of Vomit"	Burt Reynolds vs. **William Shatner**	**Ellen DeGeneres** vs. Laura Schlessinger	George W. Bush vs. **Gavin Rossdale**	November 5, 2000
Fight 1: William Shatner rips Burt Reynolds's torso open & removes his internal organs. Fight 2: Viewers are allowed to call into both contestants. Laura Schlessinger is beaten and held upside down, causing her brain to fall out. Featuring David Crosby. Fight 3: George W. Bush's head explodes via guitar riffs from Gavin Rossdale's guitar. Featuring George H. W. and Barbara Bush.
52	19	"Suddenly Diamond"	Diana Ross vs. **Whitney Houston**	**Anthony Hopkins** vs. Jodie Foster	Charlton Heston vs. **Russell Crowe**	November 12, 2000
Fight 1: The third "Battle of the Devastating Divas". Both contestants are allowed to use elaborate jewelry as weaponry. Diana Ross' head is burned via an x-ray machine. Fight 2: The two combatants have been deprived of food for some time, are covered in bacon, corn and vegetable oil, and have their hands tied behind their backs, so that they will fight by trying to eat each other. Jodie Foster is devoured by Anthony Hopkins. Featuring Julianne Moore. Fight 3: The objective of the match is to reach the top of the Tower of Terror, a titanium tower covered in traps activated from the announcers' booth. Charlton Heston is crushed by the collapsing Tower of Terror.
53	20	"Family Night II"	Ashley Judd vs. **Wynonna Judd**	Carroll O'Connor vs. Sherman Hemsley	Alec and **Daniel Baldwin** vs. Damon and Keenen Ivory Wayans	November 19, 2000
Fight 1: After using a straw to suck out Wynonna's fat, Ashley Judd's head becomes filled with blubber. She falls face-forward, splattering her head across the ring. Fight 2: The fourth fight from the Deathmatch Vault, set in the 1970s. The ring is decorated like the set from All in the Family. Both Carroll O'Connor and Sherman Hemsley roll down a flight of stairs and die after going through a wall and into a closet. Fight 3: Shawn Wayans, Marlon Wayans, William Baldwin, and Stephen Baldwin are all buried up to their necks on the beach; the winning family saves their other two siblings from the rising tide. During the match, Daniel Baldwin hallucinates that he is in a hotel room and begins to destroy the ring as if he were trashing a hotel room. During his hallucination he rips out Damon Wayans' internal organs, thinking he is a minibar and that he's breaking beer bottles. A hallucinating Daniel smashes Keenen Ivory Wayans's head open while thinking he's a TV set and bites off Alec Baldwin's head while thinking he's a cop trying to arrest him. Featuring David Letterman as a guest commentator for the fight.
54	21	"Celebrity Deathmatch Top 10"	N/A	N/A	N/A	January 7, 2001
Jerry Springer (with an audience) hosts a clip show celebrating the top 10 battles of Celebrity Deathmatch: 1. Spice Girls vs. Hanson from the pilot episode 2. Charlton Heston vs. Russell Crowe from episode 52; 3. Gandhi vs. Genghis Kahn from episode 16; 4. Mike Tyson vs. Evander Holyfield from episode 13; 5. Keanu Reeves vs. Brad Pitt from episode 32; 6. Jeff Gordon vs. Dale Earnhardt from episode 41; 7. Elvis Presley vs. Jerry Garcia from episode 05; 8. Winona Ryder vs. Gwyneth Paltrow from episode 28; 9. Martin Scorsese vs. Oliver Stone from episode 20; 10. Ron Jeremy vs. Tommy Lee from episode 24
55	22	"Nick's Little Friend"	**Phil Collins** vs. Sting	Warren Beatty and **Annette Bening** vs. **Tim Robbins** and Susan Sarandon	**Ol' Dirty Bastard** vs. LeAnn Rimes	January 14, 2001
Fight 1: Sting's head is smashed by his own severed feet, leaving only his brain and eyeballs. This match goes on throughout the whole show as Sting attempts to do all 45 Kama Sutra positions with Collins. Featuring Timmy Leland. Fight 2: Warren Beatty and Susan Sarandon are both impaled on the tusks of two audience members' rhino-shaped hats. Fight 3: Ol' Dirty Bastard takes LeAnn Rimes' tongue out and slams her repeatedly, causing her limbs to fall out before stomping her and pulling her tongue out until she finally dies. Timmy Leland is pushed down a flight of stairs by Nick Diamond.
56	23	"Nick Gets High"	**Dana Carvey** vs. Mike Myers	**Angelina Jolie** vs. Sandra Bullock	Leonardo DiCaprio vs. **Woody Harrelson**	January 21, 2001
Fight 1: Both contestants fight while interpreting characters from their movies and their Saturday Night Live sketches. Dana Carvey shoves Mike Myers' own right hand & pinkie finger through one of his nostrils which causes impalement into the top of his skull causing him to bleed to death within only a few seconds. Fight 2: Angelina Jolie stretches out her lips and places them on opposite ring posts. She proceeds to suck in air, drawing Sandra towards her until her lips whip off the ring posts and slice Sandra in half. James Haven is blown up by a bomb that he has fetched out from Angelina's pants. Fight 3: The ring is decorated like a rainforest. Leonardo DiCaprio is knocked into a Venus flytrap by Woody Harrelson and eaten.
57	24	"Deathcon 2001"	**Linda Hamilton** vs. Sigourney Weaver	Cousin Grimm vs. **Potato Khan**	**Harrison Ford** vs. Samuel L. Jackson	February 4, 2001
Fight 1: Sigourney Weaver is impaled on a small chest-burster figurine. Fight 2: Part three of the Freak Fight series. Potato Khan is sliced by a grate that Cousin Grimm was holding. He regenerates as numerous small pieces. After eating the small remains of Potato Khan, they get into his brain, hurting him from the inside. He tries to get them out by smashing his head into the turnbuckle and bashing his head with his club, the end result being that he smashes his own head in. Fight 3: Samuel L. Jackson is sliced into pieces with a reciprocating saw and made into a birdhouse. Featuring George Lucas, as a guest referee. In an attempt to escape from fans, Lucas gets caught in a Death Star-style garbage disposal and is eventually crushed at the end of the episode.
58	25	"Fandemonium III"	**Beavis** vs. Butt-Head	Backstreet Boys vs. **NSYNC**	N/A	February 11, 2001
Fight 1: Beavis, as the Great Cornholio, slices up Butt-Head into meat strips with tongs and a spatula to make "TP for [his] bunghole." This is the only Deathmatch between two 2D animated characters. Fight 2: Justin Timberlake and Chris Kirkpatrick electrocute the Backstreet Boys, while in the form of the Backstreet Beast, with some electric wires.

=== Season 4 (2001–02) ===
No. overall	No. in season	Title	Fight 1	Fight 2	Fight 3	Original release date
59	1	"Where is Bob Costas?"	**Lil' Kim** vs. Little Richard	Helen Hunt vs. **Leelee Sobieski**	George Clooney vs. Mark Wahlberg	July 22, 2001
Fight 1: Lil' Kim pushes Little Richard's organs out of the holes where his nipples used to be. Featuring John Tesh as a guest commentator. Fight 2: Leelee Sobieski feeds Helen Hunt her own hair, which is so long that it flows through her ears from her mouth. Leelee pulls the hair sticking through Helen's ears, causing her head to implode, resulting in the removal of her brain. After she kills Helen, Leelee pretends to be Helen to steal her fame and her career; she then rips the skin off Helen's hands and feet and puts them on like gloves and shoes, respectively, so fingerprints and footprints can confirm it. Fight 3: Halfway through the match, it is revealed that George and Mark were pretending to fight using special effects so they could make it look like Mark was killed and thus collect a large sum from a gambling house where they had wagered that George would win. Angered by the fraud, **Paul Newman** and **Robert Redford** intervene and begin fighting George and Mark. Paul and Robert jump down from the catwalk on top of Mark and George, crushing and killing them. Featuring Paul Newman and Robert Redford.
60	2	"Slaughter and the City"	**Steve Irwin** vs. Medusa	Drew Carey vs. **Ray Romano**	Kim Cattrall vs. Cynthia Nixon vs. **Kristin Davis** vs. Sarah Jessica Parker	July 29, 2001
Fight 1: Steve Irwin accidentally decapitates Medusa when she pushed him away after he put a rucksack over her head. Fight 2: Drew Carey scratches his own face leaving it with zero skin after Ray slingshotted his protective cup into his face, causing his face to break out in jock itch uncontrollably. Fight 3: Kim Cattrall sticks Cynthia Nixon's "back massager" into her throat and turns it on, which decapitates Cynthia Nixon. Cattrall slams two high-heel sandals into Sarah Jessica Parker's head heel-first. Cattrall is broken in half by Kristin Davis's "back massager". At the end of the match, Nick accidentally drops Medusa's severed head into the ring and everybody in the arena is turned to stone.
61	3	"A Celebrity Deathmatch Special Report"	Katie Holmes vs. Keri Russell	**Johnny Gomez** and **Nick Diamond** vs. Sam Donaldson	Claire Danes vs. Whoopi Goldberg	August 5, 2001
Fight 1: Keri Russell accidentally swallows a helium tank whole, something that leaves her body severely deformed and is later inflated by the helium to mass proportions and popped by Claire Danes, who used hydrogen-peroxide darts. Katie Holmes and the audience all die in the explosion of Keri Russell. Fight 2: A grudge match. After the explosion of Keri Russell, which destroys most of the arena, Johnny and Nick speed to the hospital since Johnny is wounded. When they see on TV that Sam Donaldson is telling everyone both Johnny and Nick are dead to take their spot as CDM hosts, they return to the studio and fight him. Johnny shoves a microphone down Sam Donaldson's throat, then Nick Diamond puts a hose in Sam's mouth. The firefighters in the arena turn on the water, filling Sam's stomach with water and electrocuting him. Fight 3: Whoopi and Claire stop fighting to make Claire confess why she shot the hydrogen peroxide dart at Keri Russell. Claire reveals the reason she did not mean to cause the day's trouble, and just wanted her acting career back.
62	4	"Blink 182 vs. 98 Degrees"	Blink-182 vs. 98 Degrees	98 Degrees vs. **Jessica Simpson**	N/A	August 12, 2001
Fight 1: Both bands fight in giant Gundam ripoff robots, and the fight eventually leaks out into the street. Blink-182's robot is cut in two by a laser shot from 98 Degrees's robot. Featuring Stone Cold Steve Austin, Jessica Simpson and Potato Khan. Fight 2: This fight wasn't planned. Jessica Simpson is accidentally shot with a growth ray and becomes big enough to fight 98 Degrees. George W. Bush sends a missile to destroy 98 Degrees' robot when it goes out of control, but he fires early because his watch is fast. Simpson throws the cockpit of 98 Degrees' robot into the air and it collides with the missile.
63	5	"Food Fights"	**Jonathan Davis** vs. Meat Loaf	Colonel Sanders vs. **Dave Thomas**	Michael Caine vs. **Kevin Spacey**	August 19, 2001
Fight 1: Meat Loaf's head is cracked open after he lands headfirst on the steel chairs leading to the ring. He is later revived by fans in the audience who are listening to his trademark baseline. But, in a direct imitation of Korn's music video Freak on a Leash, he is shot by a piece of corn that came from Jonathan Davis's butt after it ricochets around the arena and bounces off the turnbuckle after the latter is kicked into the booth by Meat Loaf. Fight 2: The ring is decorated with fast food restaurant props. Colonel Sanders is decapitated by a hen Dave Thomas had rescued from him. Colonel Sanders's headless body runs around until it falls into a deep-frier. Fight 3: Michael Caine has to fight while acting as a hot dog and Kevin Spacey has to do the same as a hamburger. Kevin Spacey puts Michael Caine under a heat lamp, causing him to plump up like a hot dog and explode. Kevin Spacey is eaten alive by Dave Thomas.
64	6	"Where Is Albert Einstein's Brain?"	Albert Einstein vs. **Chyna**	**Eddie Vedder** vs. Scott Stapp	David Blaine vs. **David Copperfield**	August 26, 2001
Fight 1: Albert Einstein's brain is squeezed out after being wrapped in his own tongue. Fight 2: The ropes in the ring are replaced with barbed wire for this fight. This fight concerns Vedder and Stapp's similar singing voices. After Scott Stapp's larynx is torn apart by barbed wire, Tom Waits enters the ring believing that Scott is trying to steal his characteristic voice. Tom punches Scott in the face until his head is crushed. Fight 3: The two magicians are given their items from their TV specials to perform magic while fighting one another. David Blaine is knocked into a piranha tank and eaten alive. Featuring Claudia Schiffer.
65	7	"Debbie is Pregnant"	Corey Feldman vs. Corey Haim	Lisa Ling vs. **Lucy Liu**	**Kobe Bryant** vs. Shaquille O'Neal	March 7, 2002
Fight 1: The two combatants try to climb to the top of a pole with Harvey Weinstein perched at the top, ready to offer the winner the leading role in a film. Corey Haim is crushed by Weinstein. Corey Feldman and Harvey Weinstein are impaled by the pole. Fight 2: Lisa Ling's skull gets kicked out by Lucy Liu. Featuring Barbara Walters. Fight 3: The two combatants play a game of basketball with each other's body parts. Shaquille O'Neal's body parts and internal organs are ripped out/off and used as makeshift basketballs.
66	8	"Gottfried in the Arena"	**Frankie Muniz** vs. Robert Iler	J. K. Rowling vs. Stephen King	**Naomi Campbell** vs. Rebecca Romijn	March 14, 2002
Fight 1: Frankie Muniz tricks Robert Iler into eating spiked ravioli, stuffed with antacids. As a result, Iler's stomach explodes. The winner of this fight would be made ten years younger with the CDM time machine so he could continue being a child star. However, when Frankie is placed in the machine, a power surge (caused by Mills Lane) causes Frankie to become an old man. Featuring Gilbert Gottfried. Fight 2: Stephen King is electrocuted by a lightning bolt manifested by the magic of Lord Voldemort. The lightning activates King's mechanical leg, which knocks off J. K. Rowling's head. Fight 3: Due to a cheese-related accident (caused by Nick) inside the green room, Naomi Campbell and Rebecca Romijn are forced to fight in their bras and panties. Rebecca Romijn is sprayed with Naomi Campbell's stomach acid, causing Rebecca to melt in a pile of gore.
67	9	"Battle of the Superfreaks"	**Cousin Grimm** vs. Pierce McCrack	Beni Trauma vs. **Potato Khan**	Cousin Grimm vs. **Potato Khan**	March 14, 2002
Fight 1: A replay of "Cousin Grimm vs. Pierce McCrack" from season 3, episode 4. Fight 2: A replay of "Beni Trauma vs. Potato Khan" from season 3, episode 12. Fight 3: A replay of "Cousin Grimm vs. Potato Khan" from season 3, episode 24.
68	10	"Clash of the Trashy Titans"	**Chuck Berry** vs. James Brown	George Michael vs. **Paul Reubens**	Halle Berry vs. **Shannen Doherty**	March 21, 2002
Fight 1: James Brown is crushed by an overhead light after the lasers he is firing from his feet bounces off of Chuck Berry's giant diamond ring and hit the light. Fight 2: George Michael is ripped apart by a tiger that is awakened when Paul says the secret word "Sucker", causing everyone in the Arena to scream wildly. Both combatants are dressed as Roman gladiators using spare parts as armor and weapons. Fight 3: The two combatants fight in the Dome of Devastation, which has been filled with car parts. During the fight, a car engine falls off the top of the Dome and lands on Shannen Doherty's head. She doesn't die, however, as the motor fuses itself into her brain and she becomes a cyborg. Halle Berry is sliced in half by the motor fused with Shannen Doherty's head.
69	11	"The Mysterious T"	Anne Robinson vs. **Bob Barker**	John Edward vs. **Miss Cleo**	**Beyoncé** vs. Missy Elliott	April 11, 2002
Fight 1: Anne Robinson's ovaries and internal organs are ripped out. Fight 2: The fighters are given a medium's tools to fight with. Nostradamus is originally billed to fight John Edward, but leaves a note in the time machine saying that he forfeits because he foresees his own demise. A giant 8-ball is shoved in John Edward's throat, and he is then decapitated. Fight 3: This is a ladder match. At the top of the ladder is a "Mystery Box of Fun". Missy Elliott is stung to death by killer bees inside the "Mystery Box of Fun". Featuring Mathew Knowles and Mr. T.
70	12	"Celebrity Deathmatch: North vs. South"	**Derek Jeter** vs. John Rocker	**Faith Hill** vs. Janet Jackson	Robert E. Lee vs. **Ulysses S. Grant**	April 18, 2002
Fight 1: John Rocker is electrocuted by a Die-Hard battery. Fight 2: Since both Janet Jackson and Faith Hill are so pretty and would probably fight poorly, the two women are locked in a room with each other for a few months to help them be more fierce during their fight. Janet Jackson's front is ripped off, causing her internal organs to spill out. Fight 3: Robert E. Lee and Ulysses S. Grant get into a sword duel and slash each other to pieces. With only their thumbs remaining, the fight quickly turns into a small thumb war, in which Grant's thumb wins by jumping on and crushing Lee's thumb. Featuring Ronnie Van Zant and Allen Collins.
71	13	"The Missing Beatles Tape"	Bill Maher vs. **Conan O'Brien**	**Anna Nicole Smith** vs. Sarah Ferguson	George Harrison vs. **John Lennon** vs. **Paul McCartney** vs. Ringo Starr	April 25, 2002
Fight 1: Bill Maher's skull is stomped through. Then Conan picks his face and plays with it in a gag similarly seen on Conan's own talk show. Fight 2: Sarah's chest explodes after Anna Nicole marries her (a reference to Anna's short marriage to J. Howard Marshall) in a move known as the Black Widow Wipeout. Featuring Ted Turner. Fight 3: The fifth fight from the Deathmatch Vault, taped in the 1970s. Ringo Starr's head is smashed with a giant silver hammer from Paul. Paul and John ambush George Harrison, citing him as the reason for the Beatles' breakup. Paul jumps on George and crushes his head. Featuring Yoko Ono.
72	14	"Nicky Jr.'s Birthday"	Beck vs. Björk	Tony Bennett vs. **Willie Nelson**	**Anna Kournikova** vs. Elizabeth Hurley	May 2, 2002
Fight 1: Beck fights with a portable set of two turntables and a microphone, while Björk fights with a keyboard with a miniature mixing board and a sound generator. Björk is sliced in half by **Johann Sebastian Bach's** plow while complementing Bach. Bach twists Beck's neck and punches his head off. Fight 2: Tony Bennett is disintegrated by a red laser light launched from Willie Nelson's third eye, revealed after Willie removes his bandanna. Fight 3: Elizabeth Hurley is dragged through the 'Pit of Puberty' grate, a pit filled with sex-starved adolescent boys, by Anna Kournikova. Hurley's head is split in half which also results in the removal of her brain.
73	15	"Salute to Laughter II"	Jenna Elfman vs. **Kathy Griffin**	**Buster Keaton** vs. Charlie Chaplin	**Bill Murray** vs. Chris Kattan	May 9, 2002
Fight 1: Jenna Elfman's upper section of her body is shredded by Kathy Griffin's "motor mouth". Both contestants are forced to fight with socks in their mouths so they wouldn't talk. Featuring John Patrick and Maggie Griffin (Kathy's parents) and Brooke Shields. Fight 2: The sixth and last fight from the Deathmatch Vault, filmed in 1928. Charlie Chaplin is flattened by a train. Featuring Roscoe Arbuckle. Fight 3: Both contestants fight while interpreting characters from their movies and their Saturday Night Live sketches. Chris Kattan is smashed to pieces when Murray rolls him into a turnbuckle like a bowling ball. He later returns as a ghost but is beaten yet again when Murray captures him with his weaponry from the movie Ghostbusters.
74	16	"Mills' Memory Lane"	N/A	N/A	N/A	May 16, 2002
Clip show about Mills Lane.
75	17	"Fandemonium IV"	Survivor seasons one and two battle royale	N/A	N/A	May 23, 2002
The contestants from Survivor are suspended from a rafter above the arena and would be voted into the ring by the audience. The ring is decorated like the Survivor island and all contestants were allowed to bring in an item to use as a weapon. Featuring Jeff Probst as a guest referee.
76	18	"Assamania I"	LL Cool J vs. **Queen Latifah**	Mandy Moore vs. **Pink**	Ben Stein vs. **Johnny Knoxville**	May 30, 2002
Fight 1: LL Cool J is sliced into pieces by a spring removed by a chair. The ring is decorated like the set of The Queen Latifah Show. Fight 2: Mandy Moore is stabbed in the ears with her sharpened lollipop. Her brains are then blown through her ear and spilled on the mat of the ring causing her to bleed to death. Fight 3: The fight is played out like Win Ben Stein's Money. Johnny Knoxville gets his tongue punched off and is forced to eat rotten eggs, which he throws up on Stein. Ben Stein gets a porta - potty filled with feces dumped on his head. Ben Stein is beaten to death by a rabid, bloodthirsty donkey that Knoxville communicates with.
77	19	"Rockstarmagedon"	**Jimi Hendrix** vs. Lenny Kravitz	**Bob Marley** vs. Shaggy	Dave Matthews vs. **Keith Richards**	June 6, 2002
Fight 1: Lenny Kravitz is forced to swallow Jimi Hendrix's vomit, which gets stuck in his throat. Jimi Hendrix then pushes him into the ropes and clotheslined him, causing his throat to explode. Fight 2: Shaggy is impaled by a ring post by Marley continuously until his entire body is festered with holes. Bob Marley then uses the ring post as a blunt to smoke Shaggy's remains. Fight 3: Dave Matthews' heart explodes after his circulatory system is filled with Keith Richards' contaminated blood.

=== Season 5 (2006) ===
No. overall	No. in season	Title	Fight 1	Fight 2	Fight 3	Original release date
78	1	"Celebrity Deathmatch: Bigger and Better Than Ever!"	Paris Hilton vs. **Nicole Richie**	**Bam Margera** vs. Tony Hawk	**Bam Margera** vs. Don Vito	June 10, 2006
Fight 1: Paris Hilton is burned to death by Nicole Richie's flamethrower disguised as a perfume bottle. Fight 2: Vert ramps have been placed in the ring, allowing the combatants to fight and skate at the same time. Tony Hawk is eaten alive by Don Vito, who is actually trying to eat Bam. Also featuring "The Masked Man". Fight 3: An unplanned fight. Margera knocks Vito down by kicking him in the testicles and stuffs lit fireworks into his mouth, which blows him to pieces.
79	2	"The Changing of the Guard"	**Bono** vs. Chris Martin	Ashton Kutcher vs. Bruce Willis	**Robert De Niro** vs. James Gandolfini	June 17, 2006
Fight 1: Bono and Chris Martin plan to perform a charity concert to raise enough money to buy the station Celebrity Deathmatch is held at and cancel it, much to the disgust of the audience and the announcers. However, the pair disagree over who should perform first, thus starting the match. Chris Martin's feet, arms, eyes, and heart are ripped out. Also featuring "The Masked Man". Fight 2: Both Kutcher's and Willis' heads are kicked off by **Demi Moore**. Fight 3: James Gandolfini is decapitated after Robert De Niro hits him in the face with a metal baseball bat. His body is then stuffed into the trunk of a car.
80	3	"Sibling Slaughterhouse"	**Charlie Sheen** vs. Colin Farrell	Simon Cowell vs. **Ryan Seacrest**	Jack and **Kelly Osbourne** vs. Mary-Kate and Ashley Olsen	June 24, 2006
Fight 1: Referee Mills Lane gets the fighters drunk to get them to fight harder. Colin Farrell dresses up like a Roman gladiator and throws a spear which impales Charlie Sheen in the liver, but this does not affect Sheen. Colin Farrell is sliced in half with his own spear by a drunken Charlie Sheen. Fight 2: Ryan stabs Simon's brain with a leg removed from a stool. Also featuring Paula Abdul. Fight 3: Mary-Kate Olsen's dog's head is bitten off by Jack Osbourne. Jack Osbourne dies of a death erection: after being kicked in the testicles, he is told by Mary-Kate Olsen that sometimes she and her sister shower together, causing him to have a literally killer orgasm. After eating Kelly Osbourne's cupcake, Mary-Kate Olsen's body becomes bloated: her stomach rejects her body and busts out of it, killing her instantly. Ashley Olsen dies after four CDs, thrown like shuriken by Kelly Osbourne, hit her in the face.
81	4	"Shaq vs. Kobe"	**Missy Elliott** vs. Gwen Stefani	**Kevin Federline** vs. Justin Timberlake	Kobe Bryant vs. **Shaquille O'Neal**	July 1, 2006
Fight 1: Two lollipops are pierced through Gwen Stefani's eyes, and her head is twisted off. Fight 2: Several audience members are sucked into Justin Timberlake's tornado after he uses his "Tornado Spin" dance move. Justin Timberlake's brain is obliterated by Federline. First, Kevin melts a part of it with his horrible rap (which only Mills Lane enjoys), and then he destroys the rest of it by punching Timberlake through the side of the head. Fight 3: Basketball hoops are placed above two ends of the ring. Kobe Bryant's head is ripped off by Shaq, who tears off the remaining body parts and used them for free-throw practice after the match. This is the only known rematch in the series.
82	5	"Night of Comedy Comeback"	Ali G vs. **Jamie Kennedy**	**Rodney Dangerfield** vs. Rob Schneider	Ben Stiller vs. **Adam Sandler**	July 8, 2006
Fight 1: Several times throughout the fight Jamie Kennedy disguises himself as other people to prank Ali G like in his show The Jamie Kennedy Experiment. Ali G's fingers and eyebrows are removed, and his stomach is slashed open by his own necklace. Fight 2: Rob Schneider is flattened when Rodney Dangerfield successfully pulls off a Triple Lindy, the diving move he used in the movie Back to School. Fight 3: The fighters at first refuse to fight since they would rather criticize each other's movies. However, Mills Lane forces them to fight by threatening to bring the cast of Mad TV to perform their sketches live. Ben Stiller's head is punted off after Adam Sandler throws a football into his mouth when Ben disses Adam's pet, Meatball.
83	6	"Stand-up vs. Smack Down"	**Paul Teutul Sr.** vs. Xzibit	Jack Black vs. **Jack White**	**Chris Rock** vs. Dwayne Johnson	July 15, 2006
Fight 1: The fighters are given spare vehicle parts to build their own deathmobiles. Xzibit is ripped in half at the torso by Paul Teutul Sr.'s mutated mustache. Fight 2: Jack Black's head explodes after Jack and **Meg White** forces a tightly buttoned shirt on him. Fight 3: Mills Lane slams a brick into Sean Penn's head. Chris Rock launches himself off the ropes head first and shoots through Dwayne Johnson's body, leaving a gaping hole.
84	7	"When Animals Attack"	**Chris Farley** vs. Horatio Sanz	**Adam West** vs. Christian Bale	Jamie Foxx vs. **Ray Charles**	July 22, 2006
Fight 1: Chris Farley dies out of a heart attack before the fight could even start. However, since he died before the fight officially started, Mills Lane brings him back to life over and over again. Chris Farley finally makes it to the ring and kills Horatio Sanz by pulling on his tongue until his insides come out. Also featuring Albert Einstein as a guest commentator throughout the episode. Fight 2: Christian Bale is crushed by a giant spotlight when West flings him into the lights, which knocks them down on top of Christian. Fight 3: Jamie Foxx is punk'd into this deathmatch, thinking he would be fighting Redd Foxx. Halfway through the fight, Mills Lane provides the fighters with a Grand Piano. An audience member's head is knocked off by Ray Charles's "Cat-o'-Nine-Grammy-Awards", similar to a Cat o' nine tails whip. Jamie Foxx's head is crushed inside Ray Charles's grand piano.
85	8	"Season Finale"	**William Hung** vs. Ricky Martin	**Pamela Anderson** vs. Tommy Lee	**Jason Acuña** vs. Verne Troyer	July 29, 2006
Fight 1: William Hung attacks Ricky in a bullet time attack when the camera cuts to Nick Diamond. When it cuts back, Ricky Martin is dead, apparently from severe cuts and removal of the eyes. Fight 2: Pamela tricks Tommy into believing she still loves him after he proposes to her again. When Tommy isn't looking, Pam crushes Tommy's head between her enormous breasts. Fight 3: Jason Acuña and **Johnny Knoxville** (the latter of which is dressed like a panda) pull and twist Verne Troyer until his insides spill out in a trick Knoxville calls "Pulled Pork".

=== Season 6 (2007) ===
No. overall	No. in season	Title	Fight 1	Fight 2	Fight 3	Original release date
86	1	"The Beginning of Celebrity Deathmatch"	Mischa Barton vs. **Kristin Cavallari**	**Jake Gyllenhaal** vs. Tobey Maguire	Nick Cannon vs. **Wilmer Valderrama**	February 8, 2007
Fight 1: Kristin Cavallari uses her father's black American Express Card as shuriken to behead Mischa Barton. Fight 2: Tobey Maguire is beaten up to death with his own leg removed by Jake Gyllenhaal, much to the dismay of an agitated Mills Lane. Fight 3: Nick Cannon is burned alive and reduced to ash by the paparazzi's camera flashes from Wilmer Valderrama stripping himself naked.
87	2	"Vaughn vs. Wilson"	Mike Jones vs. **Paul Wall**	**Andy Milonakis** vs. Steve-O	Vince Vaughn vs. **Owen Wilson**	February 15, 2007
Fight 1: Mike Jones is shredded into pieces by Paul Wall's monster chainsaw grill. Fight 2: Steve-O is eaten alive by Andy Milonakis after dressing up as a Twinkie. Also featuring Wubbie. Fight 3: Vince Vaughn deflates when Owen Wilson punctures his ego. Also featuring Sharon DePalmo, Vaughn's mother.
88	3	"The Banter Bloodbath"	John Salley vs. Chris Rose vs. Rob Dibble vs. Rodney Peete	**Carson Daly** vs. Jimmy Kimmel	**Tina Fey** vs. Jon Stewart	February 22, 2007
Fight 1: Rodney Peete has his own leg impaled through his face by Rob Dibble. John Salley's head flies off after an uppercut from Rob Dibble and lands on a turnbuckle. Rob Dibble's arms fall off and he bleeds to death. After Mills Lane tells Chris Rose to "Stick a cork in it," after he got annoyed by Chris' chattering, Rose actually sticks a cork in his mouth, causing him to inflate. He flies up into the lights and explodes. Fight 2: Carson Daly slices off Jimmy Kimmel's legs with the lid of a spinach can (in reference to Popeye, as it seemed Carson would eat the spinach) and then uses one of Jimmy's legs as a golf club to decapitate Jimmy. To add more golf-related puns, Jimmy Kimmel's head lands in a garbage can (a "Hole-in-one"). Fight 3: Jon Stewart is lassoed with his own intestines and impaled on the fluke of an anchor.
89	4	"King of the Lil' People"	**Lil' Bow Wow** vs. Lil' Romeo	**Lil' Flip** vs. Lil Wayne	**Lil Jon** vs. Lil' Flip and Lil' Bow Wow	March 1, 2007
Fight 1: Since both Bow Wow and Romeo have dropped the "Lil'" part of their rap names when they grew up, the Deathmatch crew murdered them so they could be brought back as their "Lil'" selves with the Deathmatch time machine. Bow Wow and Romeo are both murdered before the match by the Deathmatch crew so they could be brought back as children. Lil' Romeo bleeds to death when Lil' Bow Wow chews off his genitals. Also featuring Master P, Lil' Romeo's father. Fight 2: Lil Wayne walks past his stepfather's gun cabinets three times and shoots himself with a pistol, a machine gun, and a bazooka (all in that order). The death occurs off-screen, but Lil Wayne's charred and headless corpse is shown afterwards. Lil Wayne's death is based on him accidentally shooting himself with a gun when he was twelve. Fight 3: Lil' Kim wouldn't fight unless she serves jail time afterwards, which would boost her record sales. Lil' Flip and Bow Wow (who both won their bouts earlier in the episode) challenge Lil Jon after he proclaims himself "King of the Lil' People". Lil' Flip and Bow Wow are blown up by Lil Jon's new album (Crunk Rock), which is literally "da bomb." Also featuring Master P.
90	5	"Celebrity DeathMash"	Carlos Mencia vs. **Dave Chappelle**	**Ashlee Simpson** vs. Her Old Nose	**Luda-**Criss Angel vs. R. Kelly Clarkson	March 9, 2007
Fight 1: Dave Chappelle throws the Taco Bell chihuahua at Carlos Mencia’s neck and it bites his jugular veins out. This fight is one of the winning votes in MTV2's pre-season internet poll. Fight 2: Ashlee Simpson shoves a stool and bucket into her Old Nose's nostrils, triggering a powerful sneeze which killed the nose. Shaun White's head is bashed in by a flying tomato, which is smashed by Shaun White's skateboard. This is another pre-season Internet poll winner. Fight 3: Each of the four combatants was mechanically conjoined at the side with his or her teammate before the match. Criss Angel is beaten to death by R. Kelly Clarkson. R. Kelly Clarkson levitates up into the ceiling's wiring by Ludacris and is electrocuted, causing their heads to explode.
91	6	"What Did Nick Do?"	Adrian Grenier vs. **Jeremy Piven**	**Rev Run** vs. Russell Simmons	Orlando Bloom vs. **Johnny Depp**	March 15, 2007
Fight 1: Adrian Grenier is split in half at the torso when Jeremy Piven gives him a bear hug. Fight 2: Russell Simmons is decapitated by a roundhouse kick. Also featuring God. Fight 3: The actors used props from their movies to fight each other. Orlando Bloom is stabbed in the heart by Johnny Depp's scissor-hand. Kirsten Dunst's head is set on fire and thrown at Johnny Depp. Also featuring Russell Simmons' head.
92	7	"Where's Lohan?"	**Jessica Simpson** vs. Nick Lachey	**50 Cent** vs. The Game	**Hilary Duff** vs. Lindsay Lohan	March 22, 2007
Fight 1: While showing Jessica Simpson the correct use of a hand grenade (she throws one without pulling out the pin), Nick Lachey pulls out the release pin and blows himself up. Also featuring Kristin Cavallari, Johnny Knoxville, Bam Margera, and Joe Simpson. Fight 2: 50 Cent "shoots" The Game with the nine bullets he has in his body. Fight 3: Lindsay Lohan's limbs and head are snapped off like twigs. She is brought back to life at the end of the episode via the CDM Time Machine by Nick Diamond, who admits to stalking her. Also featuring Dina Lohan. This match is a pre-season Internet poll winner.
93	8	"Barry vs. Bud"	Anna Kournikova vs. Danica Patrick	Chris Pontius vs. **Mark Zupan**	Barry Bonds vs. **Bud Selig**	March 29, 2007
Fight 1: Anna Kournikova is decapitated with a headbutt from Danica Patrick but does not die immediately. She lives long enough to lob her own head at Danica Patrick, who herself is decapitated by Anna Kournikova's projectile head. Fight 2: Chris Pontius is torn in half and decapitated by Zupan's modified wheelchair. Fight 3: Barry Bonds crushes his own head after accidentally receiving the "suicide squeeze" sign from Nick Diamond (Nick was swatting at lint, which he thought was a bee).
