= Glenn Martin, DDS =

American animated television series (2009–2011)

- Genre: Animated sitcom; Adult animation; Satire
- Created by: Michael D. Eisner; Alex Berger; Eric Fogel
- Developed by: Michael D. Eisner
- Directed by: Ken Cunningham; Dave Thomas; Aaron Woodley; Robert Crossman
- Voices of: Kevin Nealon; Catherine O'Hara; Judy Greer; Jackie Clarke; Peter Oldring
- Composers: Matthew Gerrard; Richard Evans
- Countries of origin: United States; Canada
- Original language: English
- No. of seasons: 2
- No. of episodes: 40

Production
- Executive producers: Michael D. Eisner; Steven A. Cohen; Noel Bright; Michael Jamin; Sivert Glarum; Eric Fogel; Leslie Sole; Malcom Dunlop; Adam Shaheen
- Producers: Alex Berger; Adam Pava; Christine Davis; Jaelyn Galbraith; Dave Beatty
- Cinematography: Drew Fortier; Andrew Sneyd; Warren Cliff (S2)
- Running time: Approx. 25 minutes (excluding commercials)
- Production companies: Cuppa Coffee Studios; Rogers Communications; Tornante Animation

Original release
- Network: Nick at Nite
- Release: August 17, 2009 – November 7, 2011

Glenn Martin, DDS is a stop-motion adult animated sitcom that premiered on Nick at Nite on August 17, 2009. The series was produced by Tornante Animation and Cuppa Coffee Studios, in association with Rogers Communications. Glenn Martin, DDS was Nick at Nite's fourth original series (after Hi Honey, I'm Home!, Fatherhood and Hi-Jinks). One of the show's creators besides Michael Eisner, was Eric Fogel, who had success creating the MTV claymation series Celebrity Deathmatch. The show premiered in Canada on October 3, 2009, on Citytv, (Note: Refer to the article of List of programs broadcast by Citytv for details.) and March 18, 2010, on Sky One in the UK and Ireland. Season two premiered on June 11, 2010. The show ended on November 7, 2011.

== Overview ==
After accidentally burning down his house in Freeland, Pennsylvania, loving father and dentist Glenn Martin, DDS takes his family — his beautiful wife Jackie, their hormone-addled 13-year-old son Conor, their power suit–wearing 11-year-old daughter Courtney, Courtney's overachieving assistant Wendy, and Canine, the family's dog with an oversized anus (which Glenn in the opening sequence calls a heart) — on a cross-country road trip in order to strengthen their family bond together.

== Cast and characters ==
=== Main characters ===
- Kevin Nealon as Dr. Glenn Campbell Martin, an optimistic traveling dentist who dreams of becoming closer with his family. He is a Doctor of Dental Surgery.
- Catherine O'Hara as Jackie Robinson Martin, Glenn's wife and the mother of Conor and Courtney. She is often stressed with the problems involved in raising a family in an RV.
- Peter Oldring as Conor Martin, the thirteen-year-old son of the Martins. He also tends to be the subject of pratfalls due to his clumsiness. He also has a crush on Wendy, but always gets rejected.
- Jackie Clarke as Courtney Thorne Martin, the eleven-year-old daughter of the Martins, who acts like an adult business woman. She is competitive, outspoken and boastful.
- Judy Greer as Wendy Park (real name Bon Wa Fo) is Courtney's assistant and employee. She was born in North Korea. Her age is unclear; Glenn has referred to her as a tweenager, but she later claims to be thirteen years old.
- Canine, the Martins' Rottweiler who has an oversized anus.

=== Minor Characters ===
- Don Johnson as Grandpa Whitey, the father of Jackie Martin. Whitey doesn't like Jackie's husband Glenn very much. He wishes she had married someone else.
- Betty White as Grandma Shelia Martin
- Phil LaMarr as Erasmus
- Bryan Cranston as Drake Stone, a secret agent that Connor befriends in "Vegas Strip." Drake later stars in his own episode titled "Date with Destiny."
- Jon Polito as Vito Renzuli, a crime boss that helps Glenn with his dental business in "We've Created a Mobster." He wants to repay Glenn after he fixes his teeth, but Vito ends up getting too involved with Glenn's life.
- Wendie Malick as North Star

== Episodes ==
=== Series overview ===
Season	Episodes	Originally released	
Season	Episodes	First released	Last released
1	20	August 17, 2009	May 21, 2010
2	20	June 11, 2010	August 28, 2011 (UK); November 7, 2011 (US)

=== Season 1 (2009–10) ===
No.	Title	Original release date	Prod. code
1	"Amish Anguish"	August 17, 2009	102
When his family fails to appreciate the beauty of Niagara Falls because they are too addicted to Blackberries and Gameboys, Glenn decides to take them to an Amish community so they can learn what's really important in life.
2	"The Grossest Show On Earth" "Circus"	August 18, 2009	109
Conor is depressed because he has never achieved anything of note, so Glenn takes the family to the circus in an attempt to cheer him up. While there, Conor discovers that he has a gross talent. Meanwhile, Courtney learns to survive without Wendy, who has gone on vacation.
3	"Save the Tooth"	August 19, 2009	101
Glenn attempts to prevent the demolition of his childhood park for the construction of a "Mall Mart" store, but he gets into trouble with the law, having his house burned down by accident and may not make it to the protest in time.
4	"Pimp My RV"	August 20, 2009	103
The family picks up a hitchhiker, a professional leg-wrestler who volunteers to help Jackie redecorate the interior of the RV. Glenn soon becomes jealous of this stranger.
5	"We've Created a Mobster"	August 24, 2009	106
Glenn is slow to realize that he is receiving business help from the Mafia. Meanwhile Wendy and Courtney attempt to make money by tricking Conor into a boxing scheme. With guest voices Jon Polito as Vito Renzuli
6	"A Bromantic Getaway" "Eco-Village"	August 25, 2009	110
Jackie convinces the family to visit an eco-village to learn tips on an environmentally friendly lifestyle, but hits a snag when the community director bonds with Glenn instead of her. Meanwhile, Conor gets in touch with his spiritual side (what Conor refers to as a "Super Chicken") and Courtney connects with her laid-back hippie-peers.
7	"From Here to Fraternity" "Alma Mater Matters"	August 31, 2009	107
Glenn takes his family and Wendy to his and Jackie's college reunion where he tries to show Conor that he is "cool". Meanwhile Jackie teaches Courtney and Wendy about sisterhood.
8	"Korea Opportunities"	September 14, 2009	108
After Glenn digs into Wendy's secret past as a gymnast, he has to face a powerful North Korean man in order to get Wendy back. Courtney misses Wendy laughing at her Fannie Mae jokes. Note: By the time this episode aired, the laugh track was permanently removed in the U.S.
9	"Fatal Direction" "North Star"	September 28, 2009	104
Jackie's life falls into danger when Glenn's new navigation system falls in love with him and schemes to take Jackie's place in his life. With guest voice Wendie Malick.
10	"Little Miss Backstabber" "Pageant"	October 12, 2009	113
Jackie and Courtney enter a beauty pageant, but after Jackie's face gets messed up, Glenn takes her place. Conor fakes blindness in order to get close to a girl. With guest voice Steve-O.
11	"Miami Spice" "Florida Keys"	October 19, 2009	111
Glenn discovers that his mother has a new beau. Meanwhile, Conor gets a pet alligator and Courtney takes up golf cart racing. With Guest Voices Betty White, Phil Lamarr, Estelle Harris
12	"Halloween Hangover" "The Boy Who Cried Werewolf"	October 26, 2009	105
Jackie overdecorates for Halloween to upstage another RV. Meanwhile, Glenn gets addicted to sugar after eating candy for the first time in years. Courtney gets upset by Wendy's crush on Conor. Note: This episode aired as part of Nickelodeon's "Shriek Week".
13	"Mom Dated That Guy?!" "Glenn Gary, Glenn Martin"	November 9, 2009	114
The Martins stop in L.A.and Jackie's ex-boyfriend Gary invites them to stay at his manor, but after 20 years Gary is still in love with her. Meanwhile, Conor becomes a contestant on the TV show "Are You Smarter Than A Chicken ?". Note: This episode aired as part of Nick@Nite's "Big Make-ups, Big Break-ups".
14	"Deck the Malls" "Malled in America"	November 29, 2009	112
The Martins go Christmas shopping at the mall. Wendy and Courtney find out that their favourite band "Boy Blitz" are at the mall. Conor gets a job at a candy store and follows around a security guard. Jackie works at a store where she acts like a stripper to get men to buy products, and Glenn gets jealous. Meanwhile, Courtney and Wendy discover the truth about the Boy Blitz band.
15	"The Tooth Shall Set You Free"	January 25, 2010	120
Serial killer Russ Nero, the only patient with whom Glenn ever cut corners, is released from prison and threatens to ruin Glenn's life. Meanwhile, Conor buys a trailer as his own "feces smeared bachelor pad".
16	"Hail To the Teeth" "Washington D.C."	February 15, 2010	115
Glenn is upset to learn that he is not the person Courtney admires most, but she changes her mind when President Obama praises him. Note: Originally scheduled to air at an earlier date but delayed to coincide with President's Day.
17	"Vegas Strip" "00Conor"	March 8, 2010	118
Conor meets a secret agent at an anti-smoking seminar, and the two form an unlikely friendship. Meanwhile Glenn resorts to stripping to dig himself out of a financial hole.
18	"Skate, Rattle & Roll" "Roller Derby"	April 12, 2010	116
Due to her acute road rage, Jackie is forced to attend anger management and finds relief from her stress by joining a roller derby team. Courtney decides to sell cheesesteaks made of dog food to the people of Philadelphia.
19	"Jackie of All Trades" "Band of Old"	May 7, 2010	117
Jackie, facing a midlife crisis, joins her favorite 1980s band, The Bang Bangs. Meanwhile, Conor doesn't measure up when he takes on Wendy in some very physical challenges.
20	"Funshine, U.S.A."	May 21, 2010	119
The Martins consider leaving RV life behind when they find a happy and perfect community which they want to call home. However, they soon find out that this neighborhood's sparkly appearance is deceiving. With guest voice Ty Burrell

=== Season 2 (2010–11) ===
No. overall	Title	Original release date	Prod. code
1	"Bust 'em Up"	June 11, 2010	204
Glenn books a spa weekend to help rekindle the magic in his marriage. Grandpa Whitey and Conor hunt a vicious turkey. With guest voices Don Johnson, Bret Michaels and Howie Mandel. Note: This was released on iTunes for free before it aired.
2	"Dog Show"	June 18, 2010	203
Canine struggles to master new tricks for a dog show, so Glenn considers cloning his childhood pet, Freckles, and entering the clone in the competition. Meanwhile, Courtney becomes addicted to sucking her thumb.
3	"Footlooseball"	July 2, 2010	202
In an attempt to get more attention from Glenn, Wendy becomes a football player. Meanwhile, Conor learns how to country dance.
4	"Jackie's Get-Witch-Quick Scheme"	July 9, 2010	205
Accusations of witchcraft taint Jackie's family tree, so she tries to prove these claims wrong. Meanwhile, Glenn and Conor get stranded with some less-known members of the Kennedy clan. With guest voices Ty Burrell and Jim Parsons.
5	"Toothfairy" "I'm The Toothfairy, Punk"	July 30, 2010	206
Glenn becomes a superhero known as the Tooth Fairy after he loses the ability to feel pain, and Conor tags along with him, acting as his sidekick.
6	"Fashion Show"	September 10, 2010	209
On a trip to New York, Glenn drives the RV into the Hudson River and Conor becomes a male model. The girls steal Donald Trump's wig, only to discover that it is evil.
7	"Step-Brother"	September 17, 2010	210
Glenn goes to his mother's wedding ceremony only to find a successful half brother of whom he is jealous. Meanwhile Courtney and Wendy plan the wedding ceremony and Conor must take care of the doves. With guest voices Betty White and MC Hammer.
8	"Life Swap"	October 15, 2010	212
Glenn becomes a record producer, Conor becomes a fish wrangler and Courtney and Wendy have a fight. With guest voice Jon Polito as Vito Renzuli
9	"A Very Martin Christmas" "Glenn Martin Christmas Cavalcade"	December 3, 2010	215
In this Glenn Martin christmas special, the talking Canine reads some extra mail that santa got and then tells stories based on what he read in the letters. With guest voices Mel Brooks (as Canine), Billy Idol and Don Johnson.
10	"Courtney's Pony"	December 20, 2010	213
Jackie takes advantage of Courtney's first failed investment by getting her interested in horses instead. Meanwhile, Glenn buys a baby doll and Conor discovers a talent for dressing doll hair. With guest voices Jennette McCurdy and Yeni Álvarez.
11	"Dad News Bears"	December 21, 2010	217
Glenn coaches Conor's Little League team in a match against a North Korean team, Jackie gets revenge on two former neighbours and Courtney meets her wildly successful ex-assistant. With guest voices Ashley Tisdale, Fran Drescher and Peter Kelamis.
12	"Volunteers"	December 22, 2010	214
The family all take jobs as volunteers while in the Volunteer State. But jealousy ensues when Jackie is chosen to be a fireman while Glenn is put on their support squad. With guest voices Fergie, Rob Riggle, DJ Qualls and Patton Oswalt.
13	"Camp Part 1"	December 23, 2010	207
Glenn returns to his boyhood summer camp to face an old rival. With guest voice Elijah Wood.
14	"Camp Part 2"	December 23, 2010	208
When Glenn discovers that his adversary since childhood is far more successful than him, Glenn challenges him to a rematch of a race they competed in years ago. Meanwhile, Courtney and Wendy argue over whose paintball teams are better, and Conor investigates a local urban legend. With guest voice Jimmy Kimmel.
15	"GlennHog Day"	February 4, 2011	211
Glenn gets a bump on the head and relives his wedding anniversary every day. With guest voices George Takei, Jason Alexander, Allison Janney and Jonathan Frakes.
16	"Glenn and the Art of Motorcycle Maintenance"	February 18, 2011	216
Glenn joins a motorbike gang, Conor meets a Bigfoot family and Courtney meets her first boyfriend. With guest voices John Corbett and Mike O'Malley.
17	"Windfall"	May 8, 2011	218
Glenn and his father-in-law go into the wind farming business together. With guest voice Don Johnson.
18	"Videogame Wizard"	June 6, 2011 (UK); August 8, 2011 (US)	219
Jackie becomes re-addicted to an arcade video game from her youth. With guest voices Kristen Bell and Rob Corddry.
19	"Date With Destiny"	June 5, 2011 (UK); August 22, 2011 (US)	220
The Glenns cross paths with Drake yet again whose spying abilities help him find a few strange things that change his life. Meanwhile, Conor falls ill during the family's escapades. With guest voices Bryan Cranston, Gabourey Sidibe and Elliot Page. (Note: Credited as Ellen Page)
20	"H*e*i*s*T"	August 28, 2011 (UK); November 7, 2011 (US)	201
Glenn meets his old army buddies while attending a funeral and he is persuaded to help them rob a local casino. Meanwhile, Jackie and Conor participate in the local eating contest and Courtney and Wendy open a fortune teller business.

== Development ==
Former Paramount and Disney chief executive Michael Eisner, who put up his own money to produce the pilot episode, pitched it to Nick at Nite rather than Fox. Eisner was quoted as saying the decision was based on Nick at Nite's record of nurturing shows. The show has a 1970s sensibility including the design of the Winnebago which Glenn drives. It was reportedly inspired by the 1971 ABC made-for-TV movie In Search of America, which starred Jeff Bridges as a college dropout who drove a Winnebago across the country with his family.

== Laugh track ==
Unusual for a modern animated sitcom, the show featured a laugh track in early episodes intended to mimic 1970s sitcoms. This was later removed at the request of the series' creators, with Eric Fogel citing the show having "too much internal thinking". Part of the criticism was leveled at the overuse of laugh tracks (which were permanently removed a month after the show's premiere). Mike Hale of The New York Times wrote: "Glenn Martin, DDS is pretty much laugh–free (though it does have a laugh track)". The Hollywood Reporter wrote: "Ignore the stilted jokes [and] the limp characterization. [...] Just understand this: Martin is an animated show with a laugh track. Imagination comes in handy, though, in trying to figure out how someone approved this concept, labored on this and then let it free into the world."

== Awards and nominations ==
In December 2009, the show was nominated for an Annie Award for Best Animated Television Production. In November 2010, the show won two Gemini Awards for Best Animated Series and Best Direction for an Animated Series (Cuppa Coffee/Ken Cunningham for "The Tooth Will Set You Free").

== Critical reception ==
Glenn Martin, DDS received mixed to negative reviews from critics, garnering a 48/100 from Metacritic based on 9 reviews after the series premiere. Variety wrote: "Despite the contributions of Eric Fogel (MTV's Celebrity Deathmatch), Glenn Martin isn't as bad as visiting the dentist, but isn't much better than sitting in the waiting room. Positioned as a spoof of classic sitcoms, Glenn Martin gets off to a bad start by incorporating a laugh track, which only highlights some of the deficiencies in the writing." The Los Angeles Times wrote: "Still, except for the dog's hindquarters, I like the look of it. (Eric Fogel of MTV's Celebrity Deathmatch oversees the animation.) Press materials indicate that the Martins will be visiting Las Vegas, Yellowstone, the Mall of America and Hollywood in future adventures, and as a fan of the form, I'm interested to see what the animators make of them." New York Daily News writer David Hinkley gave the show 4 out of 5 stars, calling it "satire with biting wit". The Boston Globe called it "cute, giggle-worthy, and only a smidgen dangerous". The Detroit News wrote that the show is "full of enough end-of-the week laughs to help you giggle yourself into the weekend". Website Shakefire.com rated the show an "A−".

=== Controversy ===
In November 2009, Maura Buete, a Florida mother, was outraged that the series contained sexual references despite airing in an 8 p.m. weekday slot, immediately following the children's show SpongeBob SquarePants. In response to several complaints from parents, Nickelodeon (whose spokesman David Bittler had stated complaints were minimal) moved the show to Friday nights at 10:30 p.m.
