= The Head (1994 TV series) =

American animated television series (1994–1996)

- Created by: Eric Fogel
- Voices of: Jason Candler; Maia Danziger; Eric Fogel; Dick Rodstein
- Composers: TCM Productions (season 1); Jack Livesey; Peter Nashel (season 1)
- Country of origin: United States
- No. of seasons: 2
- No. of episodes: 21

Production
- Executive producer: Abby Terkuhle
- Producers: John Andrews (season 1); John Lynn (season 2)
- Running time: 11 minutes (season 1); 22 minutes (season 2)
- Production companies: MTV Animation; Fogelmania Productions

Original release
- Network: MTV
- Release: December 19, 1994 – March 12, 1996

The Head is an American adult animated science-fiction television series created by Eric Fogel for MTV. It originated as a science-fiction mini-series that aired under the MTV's Oddities label between 1994 and 1996, and was followed by The Maxx. The series was released on DVD on December 15, 2009.

== Plot ==
Created by Celebrity Deathmatch creator Eric Fogel, The Head is the story of Jim, a trade-school student in New York City who awakens one morning to find that his cranium has enlarged to mammoth proportions. A week later, out bursts Roy, a little purple alien with an odd sense of humor who has taken up residence in Jim's head. Roy needed a place to stay to adapt to the Earth's environment while on a mission to save the world from a power-hungry alien named Gork.

Roy explains that there are two races of symbiotic aliens: his own, which is mutualistic; and Gork's, which is parasitic. Aiding Jim and Roy are Jim's girlfriend, Madeline; his personal physician, Dr. Richard Axel; and a group of "human anomalies." The group consists of Ray, a landscaper who has a lawnmower blade lodged in his skull; Mona, a beautiful young woman with a short tail; Ivan, a Russian who has a mouth in his chest; Raquel, who has an enormous nose and buckteeth which give her a slightly ratlike appearance; Earl, who has a fishbowl in his mouth; Chin, a long-limbed former freak show performer from China; and the annoyingly normal head of the group, Shane Blackman.

A notable aspect was that it was the first ever voice acting role for John DiMaggio.

== Characters ==
- Jim – A trade-school student who seemed to be an average joe before Roy entered his head. He had a crush on Madeline, whom he described as the most beautiful girl in his arc-welding class, but it took a while to gather the nerve to even ask her name. Since Roy began associating with him, Jim's confidence and self-image have grown and he has become a courageous, quick-thinking hero.
- Roy – A purple alien from outer space. Roy is his nickname, but his true name is only pronounceable in an alien language that sounds suspiciously like reverse English – played backwards, "I'm from outer space". Because of an attack by a race of parasitic aliens, his species is few in number. Roy wants to save Earth from an even worse fate. To do so, he must reassemble his Anti-Invasion Machine, which was accidentally broken into five pieces and scattered around the world during his entry into Earth's atmosphere. Roy has telepathic powers, which he can use to communicate with Jim from afar and call up clairvoyant visions.
- Dr. Richard Axel – Jim's physician, a head specialist. Before Jim found out about Roy, Dr. Axel took an x-ray of his head and found only a black mass. He urged Jim to continue his appointments, which Jim refused to do. Soon afterwards, Dr. Axel was kidnapped by Dr. Elliot and his imbecilic agent cohorts. Jim rescued him, and he agreed to help Jim and Roy reassemble the Anti-Invasion Machine.
- Madeline – Jim's girlfriend. At first, she is merely his crush. She is a faithful woman who admits her love to Jim rather early in the relationship. She comes to his apartment for dinner the night Jim found out about Roy, and there she was attacked by Gork. Gork entered her head, causing it to grow to the size of Jim's. Gork was eventually forced out of Madeline's head by Jim. Jim and Gork brawled for a few minutes before Dr. Elliot arrived and seized Gork. Afterward, Madeline's head returned to normal size, and she decided to help Jim and Roy.
- Gork – A member of the evil alien race that destroyed Roy's planet and now wants to eat the brains of every human on Earth. He speaks alternately in three different voices. One voice sounds much like backwards English and is apparently his native language – one is very sinister and is obviously his own, speaking American English – and the third sounds like a human with a posh West-London (or a "Proper") British English accent. The third voice was commonly used when persuading Dr. Elliot (who would have been less likely to be assuaged by a sinister alien voice). Gork's special powers include the ability to control the mind he has inhabited, telekinesis, and the ability to emit painful energy from his head.
- Dr. Lucas Elliot – A member of an unnamed government agency. He is very paranoid and firmly believes in the existence of aliens, Sasquatch, and other far-fetched urban legends. Because of this, he was a major figure of ridicule at the institute where he was taught. It seems Gork is the reason for this. As a child, Dr. Elliot saw Gork inhabit and kill a farmer. The only reason Gork let Elliot live is because he was too young and thus his mind was not advanced enough to be "inhabited." Dr. Elliot always travels with two doltish government agents who, it turns out, have romantic feelings for each other.
- Shane Blackman – Runs a support group that Jim is part of. Blackman is an acquaintance of Madeline's. Through Blackman's support group, Jim ends up meeting a group of abnormal friends who aid him throughout his adventures.

== Broadcast ==
After the initial 13 fifteen-minute installments had aired, MTV's Oddities began airing another serial, entitled The Maxx. When The Maxx had finished airing, The Head returned with a fifteen-minute recap of season 1 (The Pasquale Mendoza Show) and a new season of thirty-minute episodes, but the focus often shifted from Jim and Roy to the other "human anomalies" they had befriended. The second season lacked the serialized story structure and each episode began with a secondary opening sequence (following the Oddities credits) which introduced the characters/premise. Shortly after the second season finished airing, The Head (along with "MTV's Oddities") vanished from the airwaves.

Reruns of the series were seen briefly on MTV2 in August 2009.

== Episodes ==
The first season follows Jim's and Roy's efforts to stop Gork's race from infecting the people of Earth. The second season focuses on the further adventures of the Human Anomaly support group.

=== Series overview ===
Season	Episodes	Originally released	
Season	Episodes	First released	Last released
1	13	December 19, 1994	January 30, 1995
2	8	February 6, 1996	March 12, 1996

=== Season 1 (1994–95) ===
The first season consisted of 13 serialized chapters packed into 7 10-minute episodes. The season finale originally concluded with an extended preview of the next "Oddities" serial, The Maxx.

No. overall	No. in season	Title	Original release date
1	1	"The Head""	December 19, 1994
Jim goes to see Dr. Axel, who can provide no explanation for why his head has grown. On his way home, Roy pops out of his head and fights a group of thugs.
2	2	"The Date"	December 19, 1994
Roy convinces Jim not to cancel his date with Madeline. Unfortunately, Gork crashes and possesses her. Meanwhile, Dr. Elliot kidnaps one of the thugs who tangled with Roy.
3	3	"The Mission"	December 26, 1994
Roy tells Jim that he had a piece of technology that can stop the parasitic invasion, but it was scattered into five pieces when he entered Earth's atmosphere. Meanwhile, Dr. Elliot kidnaps Dr. Axel and, while interrogating him, discusses his childhood encounter with a parasitic alien.
4	4	"The First Piece"	December 26, 1994
While Jim attends his first Human Anomalies meeting, Roy heads to Liberty Island to retrieve a piece of his device. Sightseers initially mistake Roy for a California Raisin, but the scene turns ugly when they realize he's an alien. Jim enlists the support group to rescue him, and news quickly reaches Dr. Elliot.
5	5	"The Museum"	January 2, 1995
The Museum of Natural History contacts Dr. Elliot about an unusual meteorite that came into their possession, which contains a gemstone from Roy's device. A captive Dr. Axel tries to warn Jim that he's in danger, Madeline briefly regains control of her mind, and Jim and Roy ultimately have a showdown with Dr. Elliot, his agents, and Gork in the museum.
6	6	"Jim's Plan"	January 2, 1995
Jim enlists the Human Anomalies to rescue Dr. Axel. They ultimately save Roy's life and free Madeline from Gork's clutches.
7	7	"The Jungle"	January 9, 1995
Jim, Roy and Madelyn head to the rainforest to retrieve another piece of the anti-invasion machine, but they find themselves pursued by native headhunters. Meanwhile, Gork tries to convince Dr. Elliot that he's the good guy.
8	8	"Hillbilly Town"	January 9, 1995
Jim and Roy go to shallow ditch to retrieve the key, which has been lodged in a stone. Meanwhile, Agents Marshall and Smithee go the antarctic to retrieve the orb.
9	9	"Rebellion""	January 16, 1995
Following Smithee's near-death experience, Marshall suggests they head to his cabin by the lake. Roy and Jim soon follow to retrieve the orb, and Gork convinces Dr. Elliot that it's a destructive weapon that needs to be destroyed.
10	10	"Mona's Secret"	January 16, 1995
Dr. Elliot has a spy in the Human Anomalies support group. Roy asks Mona on a date and discovers why she's a member of the group.
11	11	"Nite Raid"	January 23, 1995
Dr. Elliot has kidnapped Roy and can't figure out which alien is evil. Jim's head returns to normal size, throwing his equilibrium out of whack. Jim's friends rally to rescue Roy.
12	12	"Rescue"	January 23, 1995
Jim and his friends break into the FBI building to rescue Roy.
13	13	"The Invasion"	January 30, 1995
Gork's kind begin taking over the heads of Earthlings, so it's up to Jim and Roy to stop the invasion.

=== Season 2 (1996) ===
No. overall	No. in season	Title	Original release date
14	1	"The Pasquale Mendoza Show"	February 6, 1996
Jim and his friends appear on a talk show to recap the events of the first season. During the show, Marshall proposes to Smithee and Gork unexpectedly drops in.
15	2	"The Rise and Fall of Jim"	February 6, 1996
Jim sells his soul to the devil to become famous. Note: This is the first 30-minute episode of the series.
16	3	"Inside the Head"	February 6, 1996
A behind-the scenes look at the creation of the series. Note: This segment originally ended the hour-long season premiere. In 30-minute reruns, it was paired with "The Pasquale Mendoza Show". It has been omitted from the DVD and Prime Video releases.
17	4	"Return of the Spider"	February 13, 1996
Jim and Roy accompany Chin to China, where he's kidnapped, hypnotized, and forced to fight as The Spider.
18	5	"The Taste of Romance"	February 20, 1996
Ray becomes jealous when Raquel falls for Claude, who's attached to Siamese twin Jean Francois. Unfortunately, the twins are actually aliens who have sinister plans for their new paramour.
19	6	"Legend of the Blues"	February 27, 1996
Jim, Roy, Ivan, Ray, and Dr. Axel go on a fishing trip and meet an evil old man who harbors a secret about the legendary blue fish that they were hoping to catch.
20	7	"The Bad Seed"	March 5, 1996
Mark arrives on earth, dragging his brother Roy and Jim into trouble with another race of aliens.
21	8	"Rats"	March 12, 1996
Madeline lands a job on a construction site that's plagued by giant rats.

== Home media ==
The first 13 episodes were released on VHS under the title The Head Saves the Earth. Snippets from the original airings were left off the video version to keep the running time under two hours. The second season was never released on VHS.

The "complete series" was released on DVD on December 15, 2009, via Amazon.com through their CreateSpace manufacture-on-demand program. There are no extras. This release omits the MTV's Oddities opening credits sequence, "Inside The Head," and the extended preview of The Maxx that followed "The Invasion." The series was subsequently made available for sale on Prime Video and the DVD was discontinued.

== Other media ==
=== Graphic novel ===
In 1996, Pocket Books released a 96-page graphic novel entitled The Head: A Legend Is Born, which was based on an unproduced episode. The cover shows a picture of Jim, and a rectangular panel folds out to reveal a large pop-up of Roy inside of his head.

The story takes place after the events in season 2. Roy and Jim have parted ways but reunite to save Mark, Roy's younger brother, who has sent out a distress call from a ship in outer space. Meanwhile, Madeline is abducted by Gork, and Dr. Elliot makes his triumphant return to wreak havoc upon the Earth with the help of his "children". Jim and Madeline's child is born—and they name it "Mark".

=== Trading cards ===
The show was featured in Fleer's 1995 trading card set "MTV Animation" alongside Beavis and Butt-Head, The Brothers Grunt, and The Maxx. The cards included summaries of the first season episodes, character bios (with information that's not revealed in the show), and characters also appeared on the special hologram cards, foil puzzle, and packaging.

=== Cancelled video game ===
A video game version of the show was planned and was going to be released both for Super Nintendo Entertainment System and Sega Genesis in February 1995, but was cancelled very early into development. However, the source code for the Genesis version was discovered in May 2014.
