= Starveillance =

- Genre: Claymation
- Created by: Eric Fogel
- Written by: Eric Fogel; John T. Reynolds; Eric Scott
- Directed by: Andrew Horne
- Starring: Tia Dionne Hodge; Ben Schwartz; Kathy Searle; Noah Starr
- Countries of origin: United States; Canada
- Original language: English
- No. of seasons: 1
- No. of episodes: 6 (36 segments)

Production
- Executive producer: Eric Fogel/Adam Shaheen
- Editors: Noel Derblich; Geoffrey Whitman
- Camera setup: Single-camera
- Running time: 24 mins.
- Production companies: Fogelmania Productions; Cuppa Coffee Studios; E! Entertainment Network

Original release
- Network: E!
- Release: January 5 – February 9, 2007

Starveillance is a claymation television series created by Celebrity Deathmatch creator Eric Fogel that debuted on January 5, 2007, on E!. The show is produced by Toronto-based Cuppa Coffee Studios. Fogel chose not to work on his revived MTV hit Celebrity Deathmatch in order to spend more time working on this show. The series became available on Peacock.

== Show ==
The show parodies celebrity situations through stop-motion animation. The show is hosted by Glen and Corey, who hide video cameras all over the world to tape celebrities in their private moments.

== Episodes ==
Ep #	Episode	Air date	Overview
1	"Episode 1"	January 5, 2007	The Olsen Twins shop for an apartment. Vince Vaughn and Jennifer Aniston have lunch after filming The Break-Up. Britney Spears and Kevin Federline plan their wedding. Tom Cruise and Katie Holmes at the hospital after Katie has had her baby. Bobby Brown and Whitney Houston film Being Bobby Brown. Brad Pitt and Angelina Jolie plan in which African country they are going to have their baby.
2	"Episode 2"	January 12, 2007	Mischa Barton appears after being killed off on The O.C.. Jennifer Lopez makes her perfume line. Mel Gibson pitches The Passion of the Christ. Madonna rehearses for her tour. David Copperfield and David Blaine meet at a magic convention. Hilary Swank appears after winning the Academy Award for Best Actress.
3	"Episode 3"	January 19, 2007	Justin Timberlake and Cameron Diaz on their Paris vacation. George Clooney and Arnold Schwarzenegger on the set of Batman & Robin. Ashlee Simpson after her accident on Saturday Night Live. Britney Spears hires a nanny. Michael Douglas and Catherine Zeta-Jones' pre-nup. Michael Jackson sells the Neverland Ranch.
4	"Episode 4"	January 26, 2007	P. Diddy chooses a new name. Ben Affleck and Jennifer Lopez the night before Gigli opens. Fabio at Busch Gardens Williamsburg. Simon Cowell in his off-time. Lindsay Lohan is confronted by Lorne Michaels and Tina Fey before hosting Saturday Night Live for the third time. Star Jones and Barbara Walters in couple counseling.
5	"Episode 5"	February 2, 2007	The Desperate Housewives discuss their Vanity Fair photo shoot. Kathy Griffin hangs out with her gays. Tyra Banks and Naomi Campbell on the set of The Tyra Banks Show. Katie Couric's farewell party from The Today Show. Gwyneth Paltrow and Chris Martin name their new baby. Liza Minnelli and David Gest's wedding.
6	"Episode 6"	February 9, 2007	The Friends cast reminisce. Ashton Kutcher and Demi Moore go on their first date. Paris Hilton and Nicole Richie fall out. Oprah Winfrey crashes a wedding. Meg Ryan and Billy Crystal run into each other. Heather Locklear and Denise Richards fight.

== Response ==
The response from critics was mostly positive. For example, Variety said:

"Starveillance isn't the kind of concept likely to have significant staying power, but it feels like a logical step for E! as the channel seeks to branch out beyond its limited reality-TV profile into somewhat more ambitious fare -- the kind of show whose best moments are tailor-made to be sliced, diced and repurposed on YouTube." - Brian Lowry, Variety.

== Syndication and Broadcast ==
Teen channel The N aired the episodes from April 11, 2009, to May 16, 2009. In addition to airing in the United States, the series aired in Italy under the title Starveglianza on E! in the same year.

== Awards ==
In 2008, the series was nominated an Elan Award for Best Animated Production.
