= Eric Fogel =

American screenwriter

- Born: May 11, 1969 (age 57); Long Island, New York, United States
- Education: New York University Tisch School of the Arts (BFA)
- Occupations: Director, writer, animator, producer, voice actor
- Years active: 1991–present
- Known for: Celebrity Deathmatch; The Head; Glenn Martin, DDS; Starveillance
- Spouse: Melanie Kim Fogel
- Children: 3

Eric Fogel (born May 11, 1969) is an American director, writer, animator, producer, and voice actor who is best known as the creator of Celebrity Deathmatch. He created the TV shows The Head, Starveillance and Glenn Martin, DDS. He also directed several episodes of Daria as well as several feature films.

== Early life ==
Fogel graduated from New York University's Tisch School of the Arts in 1991 with a BFA in Film/TV. During his time there he created his first animated film, titled Mutilator: Hero of the Wasteland, a film which one professor cited as being "inappropriate due to its violent content." Mutilator would go on to win NYU's Award of Excellence in Animation and became a cult favorite of Spike and Mike's Sick and Twisted Festival of Animation. Fogel continued to produce animated shorts, including a sequel to his Mutilator short. He soon had his reel come across the desk of an executive at MTV Animation, which landed him a job at the studio. Where, while working on his first series; The Head, also directed episodes of Cartoon Sushi (which featured the original Celebrity Deathmatch pilot), and Daria.

== Career ==
=== The Head ===
In 1994, at age of twenty-four, Fogel created his first animated series for MTV. The Head was a series about a high-spirited alien named Roy, who survived on Earth by living inside the head of an everyman named Jim. The show, which blended sci-fi action and comedy, ran for two seasons before being canceled by MTV.

In 1996, the same year the series had been canceled; Pocket Books/Simon & Schuster published a graphic novel based on the series titled The Head: A Legend Is Born. The graphic novel was based on a script from the series that was never animated. Fogel and Gordon Barnett wrote the novel.

=== Celebrity Deathmatch ===
Fogel's next series was made in stop-motion animation. Clay-versions of celebrities square off in a ring and proceed to beat the pulp out of one another. Celebrity Deathmatch premiered in 1998 during the Super Bowl Halftime and turned out to be the highest-rated special in the history of MTV. Fogel directed every episode from 1998 to 2002, along with voicing some characters, and the show became popular enough for Fogel to be named one of the most creative people in the TV industry by Entertainment Weekly. Four seasons and nearly a hundred episodes later, Deathmatch was known over the world and remained as one of MTV's highest-rated shows. Most of Fogel's projects have been in claymation ever since.

In 1999, a Celebrity Deathmatch soundtrack was released, the single "Astonishing Panorama of the Endtimes" by Marilyn Manson had a video directed by Fogel in the style of the show. Though no wrestling is involved, the two hosts from Celebrity Deathmatch introduce Manson and his entire band are portrayed in clay performing the song.

In 2006, Deathmatch was revived by MTV2, but Fogel decided not to get involved with the show so he could work in his new show Starveillance. Despite being replaced by Jack Fletcher and Dave 'Canadian' Thomas, Fogel was still credited as the creator and co-executive producer of the show.

=== Starveillance ===
Fogel created a new claymation series called Starveillance which parodies several celebrity situations through claymation animation and debuted on January 5, 2007, on E! to positive reviews, however E! decided to cancel the series after one season due to low ratings. Fogel's production company Fogelmania Productions and Cuppa Coffee Studios produced the show.

== Filmography ==
Short film

Year	Title	Director	Writer	Animator
1991	Mutilator: Hero of the Wasteland	Yes	Yes	Yes
1992	Mutilator: Hero of the Wasteland Episode II: Underworld	Yes	Yes	Yes

Television

Year	Title	Director	Writer	Creator	Executive Producer	Voice	Notes
1994	The Head	Yes	Yes	Yes	Yes	Yes	Also creative supervisor
1997–1998	Cartoon Sushi	Yes	Yes	No	Co-executive	No	2 episodes
1997–1998	Daria	Yes	No	No	No	No	9 episodes
1998–2002	Celebrity Deathmatch	Yes	Yes	Yes	Yes	Yes	Also creative supervisor
2004	Jammin' in Jamaica	Yes	No	No	No	No	TV short
2006	Starveillance	Yes	Yes	Yes	Yes	No	
2009–2011	Glenn Martin, DDS	No	Yes	Yes	No	Yes	Also character designer
2013	Team Smithereen	No	No	No	Yes	No	Failed pilot
2014–2015	Wallykazam!	Yes	No	No	No	No	9 episodes
2016–2017	Descendants: Wicked World	Yes	No	No	No	No	15 episodes
2019–2021	Archibald's Next Big Thing	Yes	Yes	No	Yes	No	
2024	Megamind Rules!	No	Yes	No	Yes	No	

Feature film

Year	Title	Notes
1998	General Chaos: Uncensored Animation	
2000	Clayton	Also writer
2005	My Scene Goes Hollywood: The Movie	
2006	The Barbie Diaries	
2024	Megamind vs. the Doom Syndicate	Also executive producer and voice of Polly 227

== Later projects ==
From 2004 to 2006, Fogel directed several movies based on Mattel dolls: My Scene: Jammin' in Jamaica, My Scene Goes Hollywood: The Movie, and The Barbie Diaries.

In 2008, Fogel starting producing a series of 2-3-minute shorts called Anton & Crapbag for MTV2 that started airing on April of that year. The series was produced using rod puppetry and 2D animated mouths. The series revolves around two slackers who try various Jackass-esque stunts that inevitably end in disaster. Fogel has uploaded most of the shorts to his YouTube channel.

Fogel's latest series; Glenn Martin, DDS, which he co-created with Alex Berger and Michael Eisner premiered on Nick at Nite in the United States and Citytv in Canada in 2009. The show lasted for two seasons, and ended in 2011. The series followed the adventures of Glenn Martin, a road doctor, and his family. The show generated some controversy due to its inappropriate content (sexual references) and time slot, which aired following SpongeBob SquarePants. The series was produced by Cuppa Coffee Studios and The Tornante Company's animation division, Tornante Animation and distributed by Rogers Communications.

In 2013, Fogel started a Kickstarter campaign to raise money for his new short film called Havoc, loosely based on his short film, Mutilator. The short is about a lone warrior facing off against mutants in a post-apocalyptic setting. While funding for the short was unsuccessful, Fogel later alluded on his Twitter that he still had plans to produce the short, saying; Havoc will live on! In 2015, Fogel uploaded an animatic of the short to his YouTube channel. Fogel was also an executive producer for the Team Smithereen pilot, which was released in 2013.

Recently, from 2014 to 2015, Fogel directed 9 episodes of the Nickelodeon series Wallykazam!.

Also in 2015, another revival of Deathmatch was ordered by MTV2. With Fogel, Paul Ricci, and Chris McCarthy behind the project. The revived series would be re-envisioned for a social media world and hourly Twitter wars, but was later scrapped in December 2016 due to MTV not ordering a pilot to the series. In 2018, MTV announced yet another revival of the show was set to air in 2019 with Ice Cube serving as co-executive producer and host. Despite that, nothing official ever surfaced and is speculated to have been cancelled.

In 2017, Eric began work on Archibald's Next Big Thing. Based on the children's book by Tony Hale, the show was produced by DreamWorks Animation where it ran for two seasons.
