= Celebrity Deathmatch =

American animated television series

- Genre: Sports entertainment Stop-motion (clay animation); Black comedy Parody
- Created by: Eric Fogel
- Developed by: Eric Fogel; Gordon Barnett
- Directed by: Eric Fogel (seasons 1–4); Andrew Horne (seasons 5–6); Jack Fletcher (season 5)
- Starring: Steve Austin; Maurice Schlafer; Len Maxwell; Mills Lane; Chris Edgerly; Masasa Moyo; Jim Thornton
- Composers: Eric Perlmutter; Alan Elliot
- Countries of origin: United States (entire run); Canada (seasons 5–6)
- No. of seasons: 6
- No. of episodes: 93 (list of episodes)

Production
- Executive producers: Abby Terkuhle (seasons 1–4); Richard Doctorow (season 5)
- Producer: John Worth Lynn Jr. (seasons 1–4)
- Running time: 21 minutes
- Production companies: Fogelmania Productions; MTV Animation (seasons 1–4); The Comedy Network (seasons 5–6); Cuppa Coffee Studio (seasons 5–6)

Original release
- Network: MTV
- Release: May 14, 1998 – June 6, 2002
- Network: MTV2
- Release: June 10, 2006 – March 29, 2007

Celebrity Deathmatch is an adult stop-motion claymation series created by Eric Fogel for MTV. It is a parody of sports entertainment programs that depicts claymated caricatures of various celebrities engaging in highly stylized professional wrestling matches. The series was known for its large amount of gory violence, including combatants employing different abilities and weapons to deliver particularly brutal attacks, resulting in exaggerated physical injuries.

Two television pilots were broadcast on MTV on January 1 and 25, 1998. The series properly premiered on May 14, 1998, and ended its original run on June 6, 2002, airing for 77 episodes. A series of German shorts, Celebrity Deathmatch Hits Germany, aired on June 21, 2001, but it was poorly received from the fans, which was rumored to be the source of the show's cancellation. For a brief period during that year, reruns of the series aired on broadcast network UPN. Early in 2003, a film based on the series was announced by MTV to be in production, but the project was canceled by the end of the year.

In 2005, MTV2 announced the revival of the show as part of their Sic 'Em Friday programming block. Originally set to return in November 2005, the premiere was pushed back to June 10, 2006 as part of a block with two other animated series, Where My Dogs At? and The Adventures of Chico and Guapo. The revival series was produced without any involvement from Fogel. While the first four seasons were animated by Fogelmania Productions and TakToon Enterprise, the series' fifth and sixth seasons were produced by Cuppa Coffee Studios, and the premiere drew over 2.5 million viewers, becoming MTV2's highest rated season premiere ever. It was canceled again in 2007.

In April 2015, MTV2 announced a reboot of the series. However, in November 2016, Fogel stated via Twitter that MTV did not pick up the pilot to the series.

On December 6, 2018, MTV Studios announced a reimagining of the show was set to return in 2019 with Ice Cube as star and executive producer. However, no announcements, updates, nor new information have surfaced since the announcement and it has been speculated to have been quietly cancelled. As of 2025, the revival from 2006 is available to watch on Paramount+.

== Episodes ==
Season	Episodes	Originally released		
Season	Episodes	First released	Last released	Network
Pilots	2	January 1, 1998	January 25, 1998	MTV
1	12	May 14, 1998	October 22, 1998	MTV
2	21	January 31, 1999	November 11, 1999	MTV
3	25	January 27, 2000	February 11, 2001	MTV
4	19	July 22, 2001	June 6, 2002	MTV
5	8	June 10, 2006	July 29, 2006	MTV2
6	8	February 8, 2007	March 29, 2007	MTV2

== Characters ==
=== Main characters ===
- Johnny Gomez (Maurice Schlafer, 1998–2002), (Jim Thornton, 2006–07): One of the two joint commentators on the Celebrity Deathmatches, Johnny is the more professional one, and a loyal friend of Nick's, despite his constant blunders. He only lost his professionalism once to Lenny Stanton, the producer's son and nearly lost it a second time concerning interviewer Tally Wong. Johnny's hair has noticeably changed from black to brown in the new season. Judging by a comment made by Tally during one episode, he may be wearing a hairpiece. Johnny harbors an intense hatred for her akin to Nick and Debbie but tries to maintain being a professional. He was born in Illinois. Johnny would often end the episodes with his catchphrase "good fight, good night". Johnny bears a striking resemblance to Mike Adamle, a former professional football player and sports announcer, who was a host for the original American Gladiators.
- Nick Diamond (Len Maxwell, 1998–2002), (Chris Edgerly, 2006–07): Johnny Gomez's more eccentric co-host, a perceived alcoholic and divorced father of one who is known to make on-air gaffes and errors and will occasionally take his son to work. He harbors an intense hatred for interviewer Debbie Matenopoulos, and has also participated in, and won, several matches by himself. Nick is so hopeless that when he mentions having an uneventful weekend, Johnny spends the show preparing for the inevitable disaster to soon befall his co-commentator. He was born in Virginia. Nick bears a striking resemblance to Larry Csonka, an NFL legend who also commentated on American Gladiators.
- Mills Lane (himself, 1998–2002), (Chris Edgerly, 2006–07): The official referee of the Deathmatch ring; he always starts matches by saying "Let's get it on!" and shows that this is one referee that cannot be knocked down with one hit. Another catchphrase is when there is a disputable move by either fighter, like using foreign objects, and he says "I'll allow it!" implying that just about anything is legal in the ring. Biting and guns are his only no-go moves by the fighters, and he prefers the ring to remain as clean as possible. After he suffered a stroke in 2002, the real Mills stopped providing the voice of his own character but gave Edgerly his blessing.

=== Minor regular characters ===
- Stacey Cornbred (Leslie Shuman): The first interviewer on Celebrity Deathmatch, Stacey was more neutral and professional than Tally, Debbie and Marv. She remained until a sudden death from spontaneous human combustion. Though she had exploded, she briefly returned in a Halloween episode as a zombie to challenge Debbie in the ring only to be soundly (and messily) defeated.
- Debbie Matenopoulos (herself): The interviewer that succeeded Stacey Cornbred after her death. She hates Nick and does not prepare for any interviews, usually just asking whatever she feels like. Debbie often believes herself to be smarter than she really is, but her personality is self-centered and unprofessional. She left the show late in the 4th season on maternity leave. Debbie is similar to Tally in the way they act and behave during interviews.
- Tally Wong (Masasa Moyo): The new interviewer from Season 5 onward. Before most of the matches, she interviews the combatants in a segment called "Tally's Korner". Like Debbie, Tally is very self-centered and unprofessional. She usually spends most of her interviews insulting the celebrities rather than asking questions. The only time Tally does ask questions, she often asks whatever she feels like asking and when they refuse to answer, she makes rude remarks about them. At times, she makes rude remarks about Nick and Johnny during matches, earning her their ire, including making remarks about them wearing hairpieces. Whenever Nick or Johnny gets mad at her for it, she taunts them by daring them to "bring back Stacey Cornbred." Tally harbors an intense hatred toward Johnny Gomez, which proves to be mutual. Ironically though, this was the inverse in the previous show with Nick Diamond's loathing of Debbie.
- Stone Cold Steve Austin (himself): World Wrestling Entertainment (WWE) wrestler and guest commentator on Celebrity Deathmatch. Also the scientist, doctor and weapons expert on the show. He also fought and won a match against Vince McMahon (voiced by McMahon himself, and whom Austin would actually wrestle with on several WWE events in real life). Although he had a prominent role throughout seasons 1 to 4, Austin did not show up in the revival of the series, for Nick has once stated that he was too expensive to bring back.
- Phil the popcorn guy (John Worth Lynn, Jr) (Jim Conroy): A running gag; usually among the first victims in the audience when a Deathmatch gets too brutal to stay in the ring. Since his second season appearance, the vendor has been burned, chopped up, and even possessed by a demon at various points, only to come back again healthy in his next appearance.
- Nicky Diamond Jr., (Brendan Muller): Nick's son, who appeared in several episodes. In one episode he was possessed by a demon called "Captain Doody," but was delivered when The Undertaker executed a Tombstone Piledriver on the possessed Nicky during their bout, causing the demon to leave Nicky and enter the hapless popcorn salesman.

== Production ==
A deathmatch between Beavis and Butt-Head in the "Fandemonium 2000" episode of the series.

Celebrity Deathmatch started in 1997 on MTV's Cartoon Sushi as a short that featured convicted murderer Charles Manson and shock rocker Marilyn Manson fighting to the death. Deathmatch was brought back in 1998 for MTV's Super Bowl XXXII halftime special. Just three months later, Celebrity Deathmatch had entered MTV's main lineup. The show was popular enough for show creator Eric Fogel to be named one of the most creative people in the TV industry by Entertainment Weekly. CDM was not the first time Fogel made a show for MTV, as he also had a hand in creating The Head. Despite its short run, The Head was noted for introducing John DiMaggio as a voice actor.

During the next four seasons, Celebrity Deathmatch became more popular in other countries and gained viewers from all over the world, but four seasons and 75 episodes later in 2002, MTV decided to cancel the show.

Stephen Warbrick, one of the co-creators of Superjail! on Adult Swim, worked as a VFX colorist and graphic artist for the series.

=== Music ===
MTV asked Marilyn Manson to compose a song for the show. Ultimately, the song conveyed the public's obsession with violence and sadistic acts which were portrayed on television. Manson believed that was the show's satirical take regarding society as a whole. "Astonishing Panorama of the Endtimes" became the only single off the Celebrity Deathmatch soundtrack. It was nominated in 2001 for the Best Metal Performance Grammy Award and later included on Manson's album The Last Tour on Earth.

=== Revival ===
Title card for the 2006 revival of the series on MTV2; produced by Cuppa Coffee Studios.

New episodes of the show, which began production in 2005, were produced by Cuppa Coffee Studio as opposed to MTV's now-defunct animation department. The show featured an all-new voice cast and a new look. Johnny, Nick, and Mills Lane returned, albeit with new voices. Mills Lane, who used to be played by himself, was played by Chris Edgerly due to the real Mills Lane's 2002 stroke. Debbie Matenopoulos was replaced by Tally Wong. Eric Fogel chose not to get very involved with the new seasons due to his involvement on his show Starveillance for the E! network. The show was directed by Jack Fletcher and Dave "Canadian" Thomas. This run of the series was also not very well received by fans, especially due to the lack of Eric Fogel's involvement. Despite which, during the 2006 season, fans were able to vote on MTV2.com for future matches by choosing one of three matches and by sending a write-in request. However, due to the second cancellation of the show, these matches would not come to fruition.

==== Cancelled reboots ====
In April 2015, MTV2 announced a reboot of the show on its Twitter account. On November 2, 2016, Eric Fogel confirmed via Twitter that production on the reboot had been scrapped for unknown reasons and the pilot would not be going forward.

On December 6, 2018, MTV Studios announced yet another "reimagining" of the show was set to air in 2019 with Ice Cube as star and executive producer through his Cube Vision production company, with series creator Eric Fogel also as an executive producer, being unclear whether or not the weekly series would air on MTV, as the new version of the show was seeking "an exclusive [streaming video on demand] or premium broadcast partner." However, in an interview, executive producer Eric Fogel said: "I've had some conversations with Ice Cube. We're trying to put a plan in place. There's nothing I can announce officially. But there have been conversations." Despite that, no other new information, announcements nor updates have surfaced, and it has been rumored or speculated that the reboot is presumed to have been quietly cancelled with the re-merger of Viacom and CBS into Paramount Global and the shift of content production overall for the company to Paramount+. As of 2025, the 2006 reboot is available to stream on Paramount+.

== Other media ==
=== Video game ===
A video game based on the series was released for the PlayStation, PlayStation 2, Xbox, and Microsoft Windows on October 14, 2003 by Gotham Games.

=== Syndication ===
Celebrity Deathmatch aired in reruns on UPN and was re-aired on TNN (The National Network) (later Spike TV, now Paramount Network) from 2002 to 2003.
