= Highlander =

Highlander may refer to:

== Regional cultures ==
- Avars (Caucasus), a North Caucasian ethnic group also referred to as Maharuls (mountaineers)
- Boykos, an ethnolinguistic Rusyn subgroup living in the Carpathian Mountains
- Gorals (lit. Highlanders), a culture in southern Poland and northern Slovakia
- Gorani people (lit. Highlanders), a group inhabiting the triangle between Kosovo, Albania and North Macedonia
- Hill people, who live in hills and mountains
- Kurds, ethnic group native to the mountainous region of Kurdistan in West Asia
- Merina people, an ethnic group from the central plateau of Madagascar
- Montagnard (Vietnam), various ethnic groups in the highlands of Vietnam
- Pahari people (disambiguation), various ethnic groups from the Himalayas
- Malësor or Malok (lit. Highlanders), a person from Malësia (highlands) in Albania
- A person from the Ethiopian Highlands
- A person from the Scottish Highlands
- Montañés (lit. Highlanders), the people of Cantabria in northern Spain
- Southern Highlanders, the mountain people of Southern Appalachia in the eastern US

== Publications ==
- The Highlander, a book written by James Macpherson
- The Highlander (newspaper), a Gaelic-language political newspaper based in Scotland
- The Highlander, the student newspaper of the University of California, Riverside
- The Highlander, the student newspaper of David Douglas High School, Portland, Oregon
- The Highlander, the student newspaper of McLean High School, McLean, Virginia

== Entertainment ==
=== Highlander franchise ===
- Highlander (franchise), a franchise of films, television series and other media
- Highlander (comics)
- Highlander books

==== Films ====
- Highlander (film), 1986
- Highlander II: The Quickening, 1991
- Highlander III: The Sorcerer (Highlander III: The Final Dimension), 1994
- Highlander: Endgame, 2000
- Highlander: The Source, 2007
- Highlander: The Search for Vengeance, a 2007 spin-off animated film

==== Television series ====
- Highlander: The Series (1992–1998)
- Highlander: The Raven (1998–1999)
- Highlander: The Animated Series

==== Games ====
- Highlander (video game), a 1986 one-on-one sword fighting ZX Spectrum and Commodore 64 game
- Highlander: The Last of the MacLeods, a 1995 video game for the Atari Jaguar CD
- Highlander: The Card Game, a collectible card game originally produced by Thunder Castle Games, reintroduced by Le Montagnard Inc
- Highlander: The Game, a canceled video game based on the Highlander franchise

=== Other entertainment ===
- Highlander, a competitive format of Team Fortress 2
- Highlander (Bakufu Slump album)
- Highlander, the original name of the Swedish power metal band Lost Horizon (band)
- The Highlanders (Doctor Who), a missing 1966–67 Doctor Who serial

== Military ==
- Highland regiments
  - Category:Highland regiments, a list of regiments formed of or following Highlander Regiments tradition
- 1st Light Armored Reconnaissance Battalion, a light armored U.S. Marine Corps battalion based out of MCB Camp Pendleton, California, nicknamed "Highlanders"
- HMS Highlander (H44), a Royal Navy H-Class destroyer that served in World War II

== Sports ==
=== Teams and school nicknames ===
==== Professional ====
- Highlanders (rugby union), a rugby union team based in Dunedin, New Zealand
- The Highlanders, a Scottish cricket franchise in the North Sea Pro Series
- The Highlanders (professional wrestling), a tag team in World Wrestling Entertainment (WWE)
- Highlanders F.C., a Zimbabwean football (soccer) club
- Highland Football League, one of three senior non-league football (soccer) leagues in Scotland
- Cape Breton Highlanders (basketball), a Canadian basketball team based in Nova Scotia
- Mbabane Highlanders F.C., a Swazi football (soccer) club
- New York Highlanders, an American baseball team later renamed New York Yankees
- Scranton/Wilkes-Barre Highlanders, an American Minor League Baseball team

==== College ====
- Cairn University Highlanders, Langhorne, Pennsylvania
- NJIT Highlanders, New Jersey Institute of Technology
- Radford Highlanders, Radford University, in southwest Virginia, US
- University of California, Riverside Highlanders
- Houghton College Highlanders, Houghton, New York

==== High school, preparatory and other secondary schools ====
- Doherty Memorial High School, Worcester, Massachusetts
- Glenvar High School, Roanoke County, Virginia
- Governor Livingston High School, Berkeley Heights, Union County, New Jersey
- Heathwood Hall Episcopal School, Columbia, South Carolina
- Herricks High School, Searingtown, New York
- Homestead High School (Mequon, Wisconsin)
- Howell High School (Howell, Michigan)
- Lake Highland Preparatory School, Orlando, Florida
- MacArthur High School (Lawton, Oklahoma)
- McLean High School, McLean, Virginia
- Northern Highlands Regional High School, Allendale, Bergen County, New Jersey
- Northwestern Regional High School, Winsted, Connecticut
- Oak Hills High School, Bridgetown, Ohio
- Rochester Adams High School, Rochester Hills, Michigan
- Somerville High School (Massachusetts) Somerville, Massachusetts
- The Woodlands High School, The Woodlands, Texas
- Thomas McKean High School, Wilmington, Delaware
- West Morris Central High School, Washington Township, Morris County, New Jersey
- Royal High School (California), Simi Valley, California
- Granada Hills Charter High School, Granada Hills, Los Angeles, California

==== Other uses in sport ====
- The Highlander, a former Mountain marathon in Scotland

== Vehicles ==
- H1ghlander, an autonomous vehicle created by Carnegie Mellon University's Red Team for the DARPA Grand Challenge
- Highlander (dinghy), a dinghy class sailboat manufactured by Allen Boat Company
- AirLony Highlander, a Czech ultralight biplane
- Toyota Highlander, a sport utility vehicle
- MV Highlanders, Canadian ferry
- Royal Highlander, a former passenger train traveling between London and Inverness, Scotland
- Austral Denning Highlander, Australian road coach

== Other uses ==
- Alain Baxter (born 1973), Scottish alpine skier nicknamed "the Highlander"
- Highlander cat, a hybrid domestic cat
- Highlander Research and Education Center, New Market, Tennessee
- A statue on the monument at Glenfinnan, Scotland
- A statue on the 51st (Highland) Division Monument (Beaumont-Hamel), France
- Highlander (Hansa-Park), gyro drop tower at Hansa-Park

== See also ==
- Highland (disambiguation)
