= Highlander (comics) =

Comic book series

Publication information
- Publisher: Dynamite Entertainment
- Format: Limited series
- Publication date: July 2006 - 2007
- No. of issues: 13
- Main character(s): Connor MacLeod; Duncan MacLeod

Creative team
- Created by: Gregory Widen
- Written by: Brandon Jerwa; Michael Avon Oeming
- Artist(s): Lee Moder; Cover: Gabriele Dell'otto; Dave Dorman
- Letterer: Simon Bowland
- Colorist: Brian Buccellato

Dynamite Entertainment has published two comic book mini series based on the Highlander franchise. The first is a series of 13 issues simply titled Highlander that was later released in a 3 volume set. The second series is a 4 issue prequel to first Highlander film called Highlander: Way of the Sword.

== Highlander ==
Simply titled Highlander, the first limited series comic book was originally released in 2006 and ran for one year, ending in 2007. It was written by Brandon Jerwa and Michael Avon Oeming in close collaboration with David Abramowitz, who was Creative Consultant in charge of the writing on Highlander: The Series and the subsequent Highlander movies. It was published by Dynamite Entertainment. The preview issue released in July 2006 had over 100,000 copies pre-sold.

It is inspired from Highlander, the franchise about Immortals battling each other throughout history. The comic book series deals with what the main characters of the franchise, Connor MacLeod and Duncan MacLeod, do concerning happenings from the films and television series. It spawned a second comic book mini-series, Highlander: Way of the Sword.

=== Plot ===
The initial issues (issues 0–4) deal with Connor MacLeod after the events that took place in the first Highlander film. Although the Kurgan has been defeated, some of those who followed him still seek to bring about some of his plans. Connor also deals with battling within himself for control over the impulses and emotions he received from the Dark Quickening of the Kurgan (issues 6–9).

The last story arc (issues 10–12) introduces Duncan MacLeod and has him assisting his kinsman Connor in defeating the followers of the Kurgan.

The separate plot line issues (Dark Quickening and The Coldest War, Armageddon) were bound into three separate trade paperbacks by Dynamite Entertainment.

=== Reception ===
Critical reaction to the Highlander comics has been mixed to positive, more favorable in general than the film sequels to the original Highlander, which have mostly received negative reviews (with the exception of the animated film Highlander: The Search for Vengeance, which has received mostly favorable reviews). Michael Bailey of Comics Bulletin was "pleasantly surprised" and felt that "this could turn out to be a really neat story". Bailey praised the story, saying: "I always felt that Connor's story was pretty much done with [after the first film, but] reading this first issue, I am seeing where Connor's story can continue", although he felt that artist Lee Moder "wasn't the right choice for this world".

Dave Baxter of Broken Frontier praised Moder's artwork, calling it "fluid, well-executed, [and] flawlessly paced" as well as the writing by Jerwa and Oeming, in particular their "above-average, rhythmic dialogue and a fabulous use of the more obscure characters and sequences from the film". Baxter criticized the "lackluster plot", however, as well as the fact that the comic "manages to ignore entirely the continuity of the first film's premise and especially its conclusion, [creating its] own "alternative" Highlander universe". Baxter concluded: "Why another alternative Highlander universe? [A]fter three sequels and a long-running TV show, is it really necessary to produce more of the same?"

Though the comic's sales figures have dropped slowly since release, Dynamite Entertainment released a follow-up comic series, titled Highlander: Way of the Sword.

=== Collections ===
The series is being collected as trade paperbacks:

- Volume I (collects Highlander #0-5, 140 pages, January 2008, softcover ISBN 1-933305-32-0, hardcover ISBN 1-933305-31-2)
- Volume II (collects Highlander #6-9, 120 pages, February 2008, softcover ISBN 1-933305-59-2)
- Volume III: Armageddon (collects Highlander #10-12, 80 pages, July 2008, softcover ISBN 1-933305-67-3)

Highlander: Way of the Sword

Publication information
- Publisher: Dynamite Entertainment
- Format: Limited series
- Publication date: November 2007 - March 2008
- No. of issues: 4
- Main character(s): Connor MacLeod; The Kurgan

Creative team
- Created by: Gregory Widen
- Written by: JT Krul
- Artist(s): Lee Moder; Cover: Jean Diaz
- Penciller: Carlos Rafael
- Colorist: Brian Buccellato

== Highlander: Way of the Sword ==
Highlander: Way of the Sword is a four-issue, monthly comic book limited series that was published by Dynamite Entertainment from 2007 to 2008. It is Dynamite's second Highlander comic, it followed the publisher's previous 13-issue miniseries, and was published from 2006 to 2007. This comic is a prequel to the 1986 movie and has no direct connection to the TV series.

=== Plot ===
It draws inspiration from the Highlander, the franchise about Immortals battling each other throughout history. The comic book centers around Connor MacLeod's search for the sword of his mentor Juan Sanchez Villa-Lobos Ramirez, after losing it in the ocean to The Kurgan by accident. He eventually retrieves the sword just before the events of the first Highlander film.

=== Synopsis ===
In 1804 Connor served on HMS Victory, against Napoleon's troops and fought with The Kurgan, who was on board a French vessel. Connor stabbed Kurgan, but before he could take his head, the mainmast fell down and the ship sank. The Kurgan revived and took Connor's Masamune (sword) as his own then he walked away over the bottom of the ocean. Connor had lost his Masamune and would spend decades looking for it. In 1966, Connor received a message from his old friend Ian who had found his sword, it was in the hands of Antonio Direnzo, an illegal art dealer.

Connor and Ian got to Paris, but shortly after they arrived Connor sensed an Immortal, it was Guerin Billuad, who challenged Connor; the two agreed to meet at Pont Royal the following night. Connor and Ian walked around the City in order to find clues as to where the sword would be sold; eventually Connor met Elizabeth Direnzo, the sister of Antonio. The two got along, and she invited him to an illegal antiques auction. When Connor came back to his motel room he found Ian dead, killed with a sword. Connor suspected Guerin and searched for him. Guerin and Connor fought; the fight, however, was broken off when they got on holy ground. Elizabeth appeared and invited the two inside. At the auction Connor sensed more Immortals like his old friend Sunda Kastagir, but also Toshiro Nakayata who had already bought the Masamune before the auction had even begun. Connor decided to wait and get the sword back later.

The next day Connor and Guerin had their final fight and Connor took the head of his opponent. Before that, however, Guerin revealed that he was not Ian's killer. Connor went back to Elizabeth and had a good time. The next day Toshiro killed Antonio and went back to Japan. Connor left Elizabeth in Italy, and followed Toshiro to Japan. Connor cut off Toshiro's hand and took the Masamune back, after which Toshiro swore to take revenge and had his hand replaced by a prosthesis. Later Connor and Elizabeth are in Florence planning their future, as Connor feels another Immortal nearby; it is Toshiro, who is angry. Connor takes his Masamune and fights Toshiro, but is disarmed. Elizabeth tries to kill Toshiro but is killed by him. In his rage Connor defeats Toshiro and beheads him with his own blade-arm.

Elizabeth is buried next to her brother and Connor leaves, to find his own destiny.

== See also ==
- Highlander (franchise)
- Highlander (film)
- Highlander: The Series
- Immortality
- Immortal (Highlander)
- Quickening (Highlander)
- Scottish Highlands
- Clan MacLeod
- Connor MacLeod
- Duncan MacLeod
- Dynamite Entertainment
- List of Highlander characters
- List of comics based on films
- List of comics based on television programs

== Interviews ==
- Catching up on Highlander with Brandon Jerwa, Newsarama, January 24, 2007
- Talking to Dynamite's Highlander team, Newsarama
