= The Highlanders =

The Highlanders may refer to:

- Highlanders (rugby union), a professional rugby union team
- Highlanders (Seaforth, Gordons and Camerons), the 4th Battalion of the Royal Regiment of Scotland
- The Highlanders Shinty Club, a shinty club representing the British Army
- The Highlanders (professional wrestling), professional wrestling tag team that formerly worked for WWE
- The Highlanders (Doctor Who), a Doctor Who serial
- NorthEast United, nickname of an ISL team

== See also ==
- Highlander (disambiguation)
