= Highland =

Area of high elevation such as a mountainous region or elevated mountainous plateau

Highlands or uplands are areas of high elevation such as a mountainous region, elevated mountainous plateau or high hills. Generally, upland refers to a range of hills, typically from 300 m (980 ft) up to 600 m (2,000 ft), while highland is usually reserved for ranges of low mountains. However, the two terms are interchangeable and also include regions that are transitional between hilly and mountainous terrain.

== Highlands internationally ==
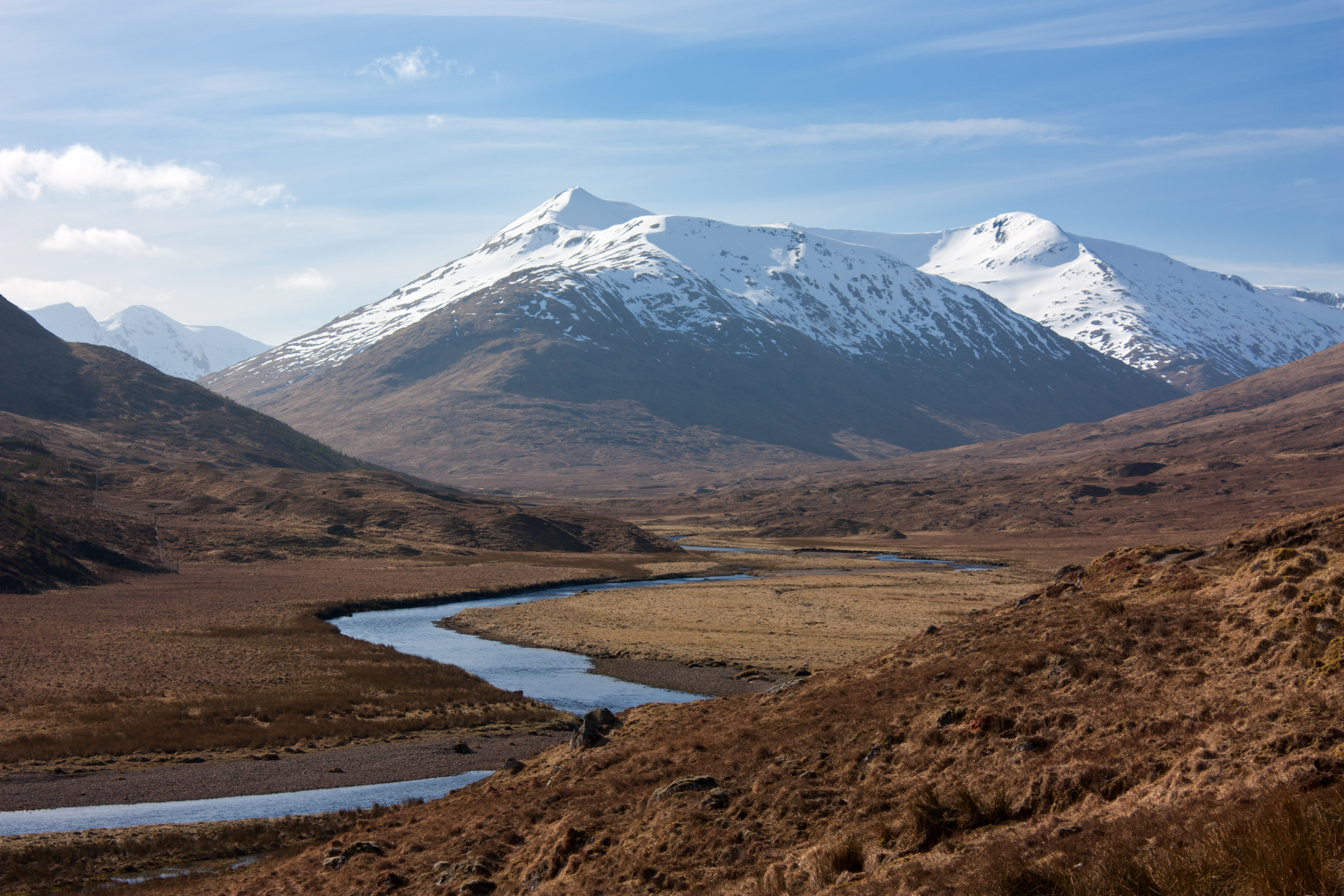
Glen Affric in the Scottish Highlands

Probably the best-known area officially or unofficially referred to as highlands in the Anglosphere is the Scottish Highlands in northern Scotland, the mountainous region north and west of the Highland Boundary Fault. The Highland council area is a local government area in the Scottish Highlands and Britain's largest local government area. Other highland or upland areas reaching 400 m or higher in the United Kingdom include the Southern Uplands in Scotland, the Pennines, North York Moors, Dartmoor and Exmoor in England, and the Cambrian Mountains in Wales.

Many countries and regions also have areas referred to as highlands. These include parts of Afghanistan, Tibet, Ethiopia, Canada, Kenya, Eritrea, Yemen, Ghana, Nigeria, Papua New Guinea, Syria, Turkey and Cantabria.

Similar terms used in other countries include high country, used in New Zealand, New South Wales, Victoria, Tasmania and Southern Queensland in Australia, and parts of the United States (notably Western North Carolina), highveld, used in South Africa and Roof of the World, used for Tibet.

The central Afghan highlands are in the center of Afghanistan, mostly located between 2,000 and 3,000 m above sea level. They have a very cold winter, and a short and cool summer. These highlands have mountain pastures during summer (sardsīr), watered by many small streams and rivers. There are also pastures available during winter in the neighboring warm lowlands (garmsīr), which makes the region ideal for seasonal transhumance.

The highlands in Australia are often above the elevation of 500 m. These areas often receive snowfall in winter. Most of the highlands lead up to large alpine or sub-alpine mountainous regions such as the Australian Alps, Snowy Mountains, Great Dividing Range, Northern Tablelands and Blue Mountains. The most mountainous region of Tasmania is the Central Highlands area, which covers most of the central-western parts of the state. Many of these areas are highly elevated alpine regions.

The Ozarks cover nearly 120,000 square kilometres (46,000 sq mi), making it the most extensive highland region between the Appalachians and Rockies. This region contains some of the oldest rocks in North America.

The spine of the mountains stretches across the island of New Guinea, forming the densely populated highlands of Papua New Guinea, and the Highland Papua, Indonesia.

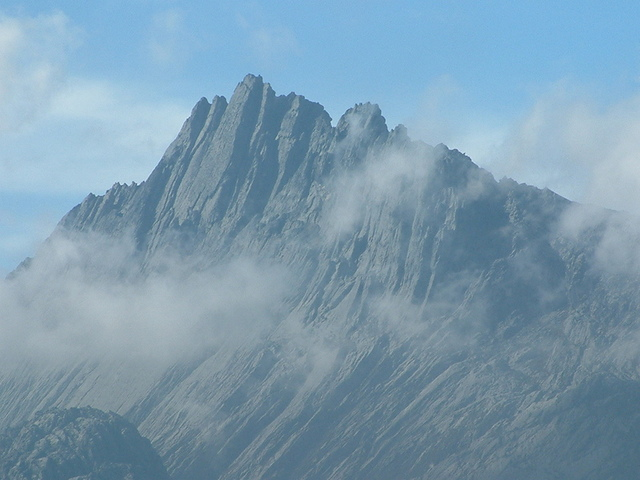
Puncak Jaya is the highest mountain in Indonesia and Oceania

The Central Highlands of Sri Lanka are rain forests, where the elevation reaches 2,500 m (8,200 ft) above sea level. The Sri Lanka montane rain forests represent the montane and submontane moist forests above 1,000 m (3,300 ft) in the central highlands and in the Knuckles mountain range. Half of Sri Lanka's endemic flowering plants and 51 percent of the endemic vertebrates are restricted to this ecoregion.

The highlands of Iceland cover about 40% of the country and are mostly inhospitable to humans. They are generally considered to be any land above 500 m.

The mountainous natural region of the Thai highlands is found in Northern Thailand.

Highlands tend to have much colder temperatures than nearby areas located on sea level. This is especially noticeable in the tropics, where milder seasonal variation give highland cities an 'eternal spring' — mild spring-like temperatures year-round. This was used by European colonists to establish hill stations across Asia and Africa, such as Cameron Highlands, Pahang, Malaysia, and Shillong, India. Officers of the British Raj referred to Shillong as "The Scotland of the East".

== Other planets ==
Highland continents—or terrae—are areas of topographically unstable terrain, with high peaks and valleys. They resemble highlands on Earth, but the term is applied to much larger areas on other planets. They can be found on Mercury, Venus, Mars, and the Moon.

== See also ==
- Highlander (disambiguation)
- Plateau
