= Jim Byrnes (actor) =

American-Canadian actor and blues musician (born 1948)

Jim Byrnes CM OBC
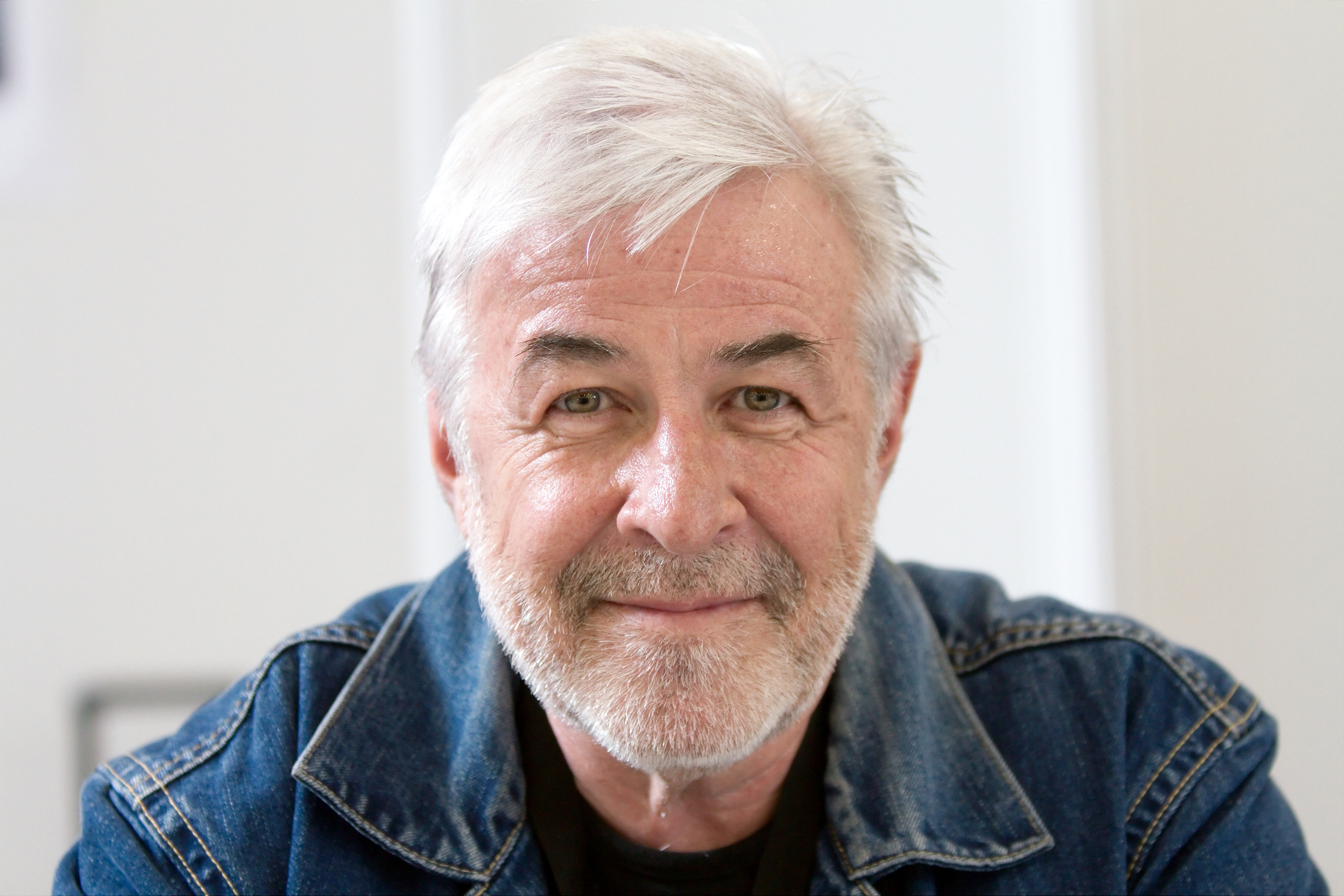
- Byrnes at Japan Expo 2010
- Born: James Thomas Kevin Byrnes; September 22, 1948 (age 78); St. Louis, Missouri, U.S.
- Citizenship: United States; Canada
- Education: Saint Louis University; Boston University
- Occupations: Actor; musician
- Years active: 1966–present
- Musical career
- Genres: Blues, folk, roots
- Occupations: Singer, musician
- Instruments: Vocals, guitar, piano
- Years active: 1960s-present
- Label: Black Hen Music
- Website: jimbyrnes.ca

James Thomas Kevin Byrnes CM OBC (born September 22, 1948) is an American-Canadian actor, voice actor, and blues musician. He is known to television audiences for his roles as FBI agent Daniel "Lifeguard" Burroughs on the crime drama series Wiseguy (1987-90, 1996), and as Joe Dawson in the Highlander franchise.

Byrnes was nominated for a Genie Award for Best Supporting Actor for his performance in the film Harmony Cats (1992). For his music, Byrnes has won the Juno Award for Blues Album of the Year three times.

== Early life ==
Byrnes was born in St. Louis, Missouri on September 22, 1948. His mother was a homemaker, and his father was a municipal accountant. He began performing blues at the age of 13, and acted as a teenager in local theatre productions. Prior to his acting career, he considered becoming a priest and attended seminary. He studied acting at Saint Louis University and Boston University.

In 1968, during the Vietnam War, Byrnes was drafted and served in the 196^{th} Infantry Brigade for a year. In the early 1970s, Byrnes moved to Vancouver, British Columbia, Canada, and later became a naturalized Canadian citizen.

On February 26, 1972, he was struck by a passing car while he attempted to help move a stalled truck on the Island Highway North of Parksville, which injured his legs and forced them both to be amputated.

== Acting career ==
Byrnes made his film debut as a singer in Dennis Hopper's 1980 film Out of the Blue. His first major role was as FBI agent Daniel "Lifeguard" Burroughs on the American television crime drama Wiseguy, which ran from 1987 to 1990.

Later, he starred in the fantasy television series Highlander: The Series as Joe Dawson, a member of a secret society known as the "Watchers". He reprised his role as Dawson in Highlander: Endgame and Highlander: The Source, installments of the Highlander film series, as well as providing voices for the anime Highlander: The Search for Vengeance. He starred in his own short-lived TV show, called The Jim Byrnes Show. He played a recruiting sergeant for the Union Army in an episode of Copper called "The Children of the Battlefield."

His other television roles include Higher Ground and voice acting roles in: Beast Wars: Transformers, Beast Machines: Transformers, Shadow Raiders, Stargate Infinity, Dinosaur Train as Percy Paramacellodus, Nick Fury in X-Men: Evolution and Duke Dermail in Gundam Wing. He appeared in the Taken mini series, which broadcast on the Sci-Fi Channel and an episode of The Twilight Zone entitled "Harsh Mistress". He has also appeared on the Syfy series Sanctuary, appearing as the father of Helen Magnus, played by Amanda Tapping and as Shineoa San in an episode of Andromeda as well as the voice of Virgil Vox in nine additional episodes.

== Music career ==
As a musician, Byrnes has won the Juno Award for Blues Album of the Year three times, for That River in 1996 and House of Refuge on Black Hen Music in 2007, and for Everywhere West in 2011. Byrnes was also honoured at the 2006 Maple Blues Awards, as Male Vocalist of the Year. The Canadian Folk Music Awards recognized him as the Contemporary Singer of the Year in 2006 and 2009.

In 2018, Byrnes performed with the Sojourners at a concert organized by the North Island Concert Society.

== Filmography ==
=== Film ===
Year	Title	Role	Notes
1980	Out of the Blue	Party Singer	
1989	The First Season	Band Leader	
1992	Harmony Cats	Frank Hay	
1992	Invader	Engineer Powell	Deleted scenes
1994	Whale Music	Dewey Moore	
1995	Suspicious Agenda	Lieutenant Rayburn	
1995	Dream Man	Jim "The Loot" Garrity	
1996	Starlight	Rod MacArthur	
1997	Masterminds	Larry Millard	Uncredited
1997	Drive, She Said	Dr. Glen Green	
2000	Monster Mash	The Prosecutor	
2000	Highlander: Endgame	Joe Dawson	
2003	My Boss's Daughter	George	
2005	Edison	Local Merchant	
2005	Fetching Cody	Harvey	
2008	Heart of a Dragon	Ivan	
2011	She's a Soul Man	Joe Cameron	
2014	Hastings Street	The Bartender	
2015	Wanderlust	Graham	
2018	24 Piedmont Drive	Bernard Donnelly	
2019	Ada	Murray	

=== Television ===
Year	Title	Role	Notes
1987	Hands of a Stranger	Band Leader	Uncredited; Television film
1987	Danger Bay	Tony Walter	Episode: "Deep Trouble"
1988	The Red Spider	Jack Fine	Television film
1990	In the Best Interest of the Child	Kurt	Television film
1987–90	Wiseguy	Daniel "Lifeguard" Burroughs	Main cast
1991	Omen IV: The Awakening	Noah	Television film
1991	Christmas on Division Street	Benedetti	Television film
1992	Dirty Work	Stan	Television film
1993	The Hat Squad	Carl Drake	Episode: "Dead Man Walking"
1993	Street Justice	The Doctor	Episode: "The Wall"
1991–94	Neon Rider	Kevin	12 episodes
1995	Serving in Silence: The Margarethe Cammermeyer Story	Vet	Television film
1995	Sliders	TV Announcer (uncredited)	Episode: "Pilot"
1995	The Commish	Brett Shrager	Episode: "The Kid"
1996	Wiseguy	Daniel "Lifeguard" Burroughs	Television film
1996	Bloodhounds II	Lieutenant Jim McMahon	Television film
1996	For Hope	Date #1 (uncredited)	Television film
1997	Two	Colonel Maxwell Foley	Episode: "The Reckoning"
1997	Lost Treasure of Dos Santos	"Doc" Humphries	Television film
1997	Final Descent	Duke Houston	Television film
1993–98	Highlander: The Series	Joe Dawson	Main cast
1998	Murder Call	Guy Hanson	Episode: "More Than Meets the Eye"
1998	The Jim Byrnes Show	Himself (host)	
1999	Highlander: The Raven	Joe Dawson	Episode: "A Matter of Time"
1998–99	The Net	Mr. Olivier	9 episodes
1998, 2001	The Outer Limits	Merlin, Gary Latimer	2 episodes
1999	Cold Squad	Dick Hofstedder	4 episodes
2000	Higher Ground	Frank Markasian	5 episodes
2000	Mysterious Ways	Ramp	Episode: "Spirit Junction"
2000	Becoming Dick	The Bartender	Television film
2000	First Wave	Tyler Greer	Episode: "Shadowland"
2000	Level 9	General Theodore Nemec	Episode: "Eat Flaming Death"
2002	Due East	Father Berkely	Television film
2002	The Dead Zone	Victor "Vic" Goodman	Episode: "Unreasonable Doubt"
2002	The Twilight Zone	Dion	Episode: "Harsh Mistress"
2002	Just Cause		Episode: "Fading Star"
2002	Taken	Busker	Episode: "Acid Tests"
2002	Snow Queen	Polar Bear (voice)	Television film
2003	Jake 2.0	James Skerritt	3 episodes
2004	Stargate SG-1	The Documentary Narrator	Episode: "Heroes: Part 2"
2004–05	Andromeda	Virgil Vox, Shineoa San	13 episodes
2005	Supernatural	Professor	Episode: "Bugs"
2005–06	Da Vinci's City Hall	Councillor Eddie Banks	2 episodes
2007	Highlander: The Source	Joe Dawson	Television film
2007	Don't Cry Now	Steve	Television film
2007	Sanctuary	Gregory Magnus	Miniseries
2008–11	Sanctuary	Gregory Magnus	5 episodes
2010	V	Matthew	Episode: "John May"
2011	Goodnight for Justice	The Governor	Television film
2011	Hellcats	Giles	2 episodes
2011	Deck the Halls	Morgan, The Radio DJ	Television film
2013	Copper	Sergeant Major Atticus Reid	Episode: "The Children of the Battlefield"
2013	King & Maxwell	Roy Smalls	Episode: "Job Security"
2014	Paper Angels	Bill Price	Television film
2014	Strange Empire	Cart	Episode: "The Oath"
2015	The Romeo Section	Reverend Ortelli	4 episodes
2016	The Legend of Davy Crockett	John Patton	Television film
2018	Travelers	James Edward Bailey	Episode: "Trevor"
2021	Sister Swap: Christmas in the City	Luke Swift	Television film
2022	Billy the Kid	Matthews	1 episode
2023	Murdaugh Murders: The Movie	Don Hamilton	Miniseries
2024	Nelly Knows Mysteries: A Fatal Engagement	Rumple Snide	Television film
2025	Family Law	Robert Jennings	1 episode
2025	Murder in a Small Town	Leland Bucholtz	1 episode

=== Animation ===
Year	Title	Voice role	Notes
1989	G.I. Joe: Operation Dragonfire	Alley Viper, Crimson Guard - Fake Lama, Night-Viper	5 episodes
1989	Dragon Warrior	Wizard Moore (voice)	
1989–90	Camp Candy	Additional Voices	16 episodes
1990	A Klondike Christmas	Wolfie (voice)	
1990–91	G.I. Joe	Additional Voices	19 episodes
1992–93	Conan the Adventurer	Epimetrius	5 episodes
1993	Mega Man: Upon a Star	Dr. Light	
1992–94	King Arthur and the Knights of Justice	Merlin	26 episodes
1993–94	Madeline	Additional Voices	
1994	Conan and the Young Warriors	Epimetrius The Sage	13 episodes
1994	The Legend of the Hawaiian Slammers	Additional Voices	
1995	The New Adventures of Madeline	Additional Voices	13 episodes
1994–96	Mega Man	Dr. Light, Sigma, Pharaoh Man, Air Man, Quick Man, Top Man, Gravity Man	27 episodes
1996	G.I. Joe Extreme	Nelson	Episode: "Winner Take All"
1996	Vortech: Undercover Conversion Squad	Additional Voices	2 episodes
1996	Adventures of Mowgli	Father Wolf (voice)	English dub
1996	Stone Protectors	Additional Voices	13 episodes
1994–96	Hurricanes	Additional Voices	7 episodes
1997	Gundam Wing: Endless Waltz	Dekim Barton	
1998	Mummies Alive! The Legend Begins	Additional Voices	
1998	The Animated Adventures of Tom Sawyer	Pop (voice)	Video
1998	Rudolph the Red-Nosed Reindeer: The Movie	Elf Crowd Member #2	
1997–99	Beast Wars: Transformers	Inferno	
1997–99	Roswell Conspiracies: Aliens, Myths & Legends	Additional Voices	40 episodes
1998–99	Shadow Raiders	Grand Vizier	8 episodes
1998–99	RoboCop: Alpha Commando	Mr. Brink	40 episodes
1998	Fat Dog Mendoza	Brian Wallace / Dan Fantastic	
1999–2000	Beast Machines: Transformers	Thrust	
1999–2001	NASCAR Racers	Additional Voices	26 episodes
2000–01	D'Myna Leagues	Rip Hickory, Dodger	13 episodes
2001	Spider-Man Unlimited	Fire Drake	Episode: "Cry Vulture"
2001–02	Ultimate Book of Spells	Additional Voices	26 episodes
2001–02	Alienators: Evolution Continues	Additional Voices	17 episodes
2002	Inspector Gadget's Last Case	Chief Quimby	
2002	Dennis the Menace: Cruise Control	Kraigor	
2002	Madeline: My Fair Madeline	Mayor of Paris	Television film
2002–03	X-Men: Evolution	Nick Fury	7 episodes
2005	Inspector Gadget's Biggest Caper Ever	Chief Quimby	
2007	Madeline in Tahiti	Scarfaced Man	
2007	Highlander: The Search for Vengeance	"Doc", Rudy	
2009	Hot Wheels: Battle Force 5	Jack Wheeler	Episode: "Legacy"
2010	Dinosaur Train	Percy Paramacellodus	Episode: "Elmer Visits the Desert"
2012	War of the Worlds: Goliath	Theodore Roosevelt	
2013	Slugterra	Viggo Dare	Episode: "Back to Blakk"
2016	My Little Pony: Friendship Is Magic	Gladmane	Episode: "Viva Las Pegasus"
2018	Take Two	Josiah Carberry	Episode: "Stillwater"

== Discography ==
=== Solo ===
- Burning (1981) Polydor (vinyl)
- I Turned My Nights into Days (1987) Stony Plain Records (vinyl)
- That River (1995) Stony Plain
- Love Is a Gamble (2001) One Coyote Music
- Fresh Horses (2004) Black Hen Music
- House of Refuge (2006) Black Hen Music
- My Walking Stick (2009) Black Hen Music
- Everywhere West (2011) Black Hen Music
- I Hear the Wind in the Wires (2012) Black Hen Music
- St. Louis Times (2014) Black Hen Music
- Long Hot Summer Days (2017) Black Hen Music

=== Compilation inclusions ===
- Vancouver Seeds 2 (1981)
- Saturday Night Blues: 20 Years (2006) CBC
