= Highlander: The Game =

Highlander
- Developers: Eidos Interactive, Widescreen Games
- Publisher: Square Enix
- Composer: Richard Jacques
- Engine: Unreal Engine 3
- Platforms: Microsoft Windows, PlayStation 3, Xbox 360
- Release: Cancelled
- Genre: Action role-playing
- Mode: Single-player

Highlander: The Game is a cancelled action role-playing game based on the Highlander franchise; it was to be published by Square Enix for Windows, PlayStation 3, and Xbox 360. The game was announced in January 2008 by way of a trailer on Gametrailers.com. Highlander: The Game was officially canceled in December 2010.

== Gameplay ==
Much of the gameplay would revolve around sword battles with other Immortals.

Highlander: The Game was to be a third-person action game featuring a previously unknown Immortal, Owen MacLeod as the main character.

An Immortal can only be killed via beheading. Thus, Owen cannot die from other wounds that would be fatal to a mortal such as gunshots, electrocution, and falls from a great height. At most, he can "die" for a brief period of time, reviving fully intact once his body has healed itself. As such, certain encounters would have involved Owen deliberately performing incredibly dangerous actions, such as using his body as a conductor for high-voltage electrical currents and jumping off of buildings to escape pursuers.

Over and above his ability to withstand otherwise lethal attacks, Owen would be able to use certain magical abilities. Such abilities, which were never explained in depth, included "chi balance", "fireblade", "wind fury" and "stone armor", to name a few. Like any other Immortal in the Highlander franchise, Owen must wield various types of swords to do battle with other Immortals. Owen can also choose between different combat styles to defeat his enemies.

The game was to span roughly eighteen missions in which Owen would encounter up to seventy-seven unique characters. Some of these characters would have been Immortals just like Owen and would have been slain. Some of these characters were previously known—Connor MacLeod and Duncan MacLeod were both expected to make appearances and Methos was confirmed as Owen's mentor.

== Story ==
The story, written by David Abramowitz who was Creative Consultant (Head Writer) on Highlander: The Series, revolves around Owen MacLeod, ancestor to both Connor MacLeod and Duncan MacLeod. It begins over two thousand years ago. Similar to other Highlander films and media, the story spans several timelines including Ancient Gaul, Pompeii, and finally modern-day New York City.

Owen is captured and enslaved by Romans who force him to compete as a gladiator. During this time, Owen dies only to come back to life. Methos, the oldest living Immortal, approaches Owen to be his mentor. He teaches Owen about The Game and how he and other immortals can only be slain by beheading.

As with other Immortal MacLeods, Owen is pursued throughout his life by a nemesis. This enemy proves to be extremely powerful, one that Owen is unable to defeat. Owen learns of a magical stone, fragments of which are scattered all over the world. Throughout the game, Owen embarks upon a quest to recover these fragments and restore the stone in an attempt to gain the power to overcome his foe.

== See also ==
- Highlander: The Last of the MacLeods
