= Highlander: The Card Game =

Collectible card game

- The card back to Highlander: The Card Game
- Designers: Mike Sager
- Publishers: La Montagnard Inc., SAEC Games, Thunder Castle Games
- Players: 2 (or more in some variations)
- Playing time: Approx 20 min
- Chance: Some
- Skills: Card playing Arithmetic; Basic Reading Ability

Highlander: The Card Game is a collectible card game based on the Highlander franchise of films and television series. It was released in March 1995. The original set had 165 cards sold in 16-card booster packs.

Players build decks from a 400+ card set, taking on the persona of one of the Immortals depicted in the franchise. The core of the game takes the form of a sword duel with players alternately attacking and defending. Other cards are played to affect the basic rules of the game. A player wins when the opponent is reduced to 0 ability or cannot avoid a "headshot" attack (i.e. beheading, the only way to permanently kill an Immortal within the franchise canon).

The Movie Edition was released in mid March 1996. The 450-card set was sold in 55-card starter decks and 15-card booster packs.

An expansion set for this edition was originally planned for release in November 1996, but the company had to delay it in order to secure licensing rights for images of Sean Connery, who was cast as Juan Sánchez-Villalobos Ramírez in the 1986 film Highlander. He ultimately rejected the request, and the company planned The Ramirez Edition expansion set with alternate means of depicting the character. It was released in April 1999, with cards depicting Connery using stills with backlighting or photographs of his stunt doubles.

An expansion set named Watcher's Chronicle was planned for release in November 1996, with its 100 cards packaged in 15-card booster packs.

In January 1998, the publisher Thunder Castle Games filed for Chapter 11 bankruptcy. It planned to release the expansion set The Gathering which contained reprinted cards from the Movie Edition and new cards. The 55-card starter packs contained a mix of reprinted and new cards, and the 15-card booster packs only new cards.

At the 1998 Gen Con Game Fair, the company unveiled the set Arms and Tactics, a 267-card standalone edition with improved card art and new Immortals cards from season 3 and season 4 of the television series Highlander: The Series. It was released in October 1998.

An expansion set named The Four Horsemen was planned for November 1998 and was primarily focused on season 5 of the television show. It debuted at a fantasy-themed convention in late 1998 before its release late in the year.

== Card types ==
=== Basic attacks ===
Nine attacks, one to each space on the attack grid.

=== Basic blocks ===
Six blocks, four each covering four areas of the attack grid, two covering just the upper and lower rows.

=== Guards ===
Defense cards which can stay in play multiple turns, but must be discarded if the player wishes to attack.

=== Special cards ===
- Events: happen once and are discarded.
- Edges: modifying other cards they are played with; not considered "Special Cards" for game play purposes, multiple Edges may be played in a single turn.
- Situations: the players stay in play and change the basic rules of the game.
- Locations: like situations, but only one location can be in play at once.
- Allies: introduced in later expansions, earlier they were treated as situations.
- Illusions: introduced in later expansions; not considered "Special Cards" for game play purposes, and may only be played from an exertion.
- Plots: formerly a subset of Situations and Events in older versions, these also stay in play and change the basic rules of the game, often adding up for a greater effect.

=== Pregame cards ===
- Persona cards: rare cards featuring established characters from the films and television series, allowing players to use persona-specific cards, or enhancing the abilities of standard persona cards. Most personas also grant a special ability to the player, such as dealing extra damage per attack or granting extra attacks per turn.
- Quickenings: rewards for winning tournaments and sponsored events, granting abilities to the user similar to those of certain personas.
- Weapon of Choice: allow players to use special weapon-specific cards.
- Watcher: affects the basic rules of the game.

== Reception ==
According to Terry Eldred, the game had a strong following on the east coast of the United States, central midwest, and in California.

== Reviews ==
- The Duelist #32
