= Brandon Jerwa =

American comic book writer and musician

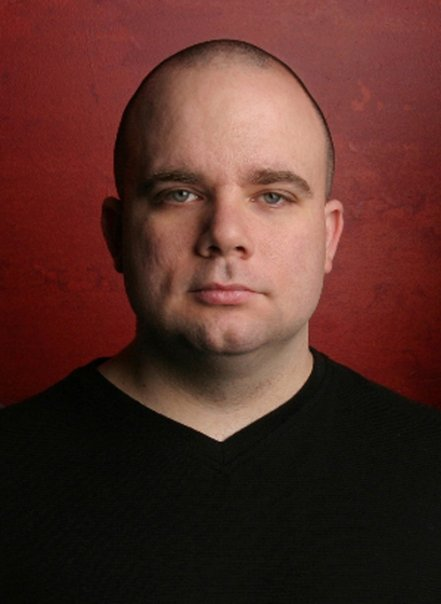
- Born: Hutchinson, Brandon S. June 8, 1973 (age 53) Manhattan, Kansas, U.S.
- Areas: Writer, musician

Brandon Jerwa is an American comic book writer and musician residing in Seattle, Washington. Jerwa is best known for his work on comic tie-ins for several prominent licensed properties, including Battlestar Galactica, Highlander, G.I. Joe and Army of Darkness. Jerwa also collaborates frequently with fellow writer Eric S. Trautmann.

Jerwa is the lead singer and founder of Seattle-area band SD6, and was previously the lead singer and co-founder of the bands Omnibox and Relay.

Before he began his career in comics, Jerwa was a morning DJ at KRQT "Rocket 107" FM in Longview, Washington.

Brandon has appeared as lead vocals on electronic band Last Survivor and their cover version of the Faith No More classic rock anthem ‘Ashes To Ashes’.

== Biography ==
Jerwa's comic book career began in 2003, when he submitted a script to Devil's Due Publishing that was accepted, and was eventually published in G.I. Joe: Frontline #11–14. Soon afterwards, he became the main writer on G.I. Joe: A Real American Hero and also wrote several G.I. Joe miniseries.

On May 18, 2006, Brandon was featured on episode #24 of the Game Show Network's I've Got a Secret; his secret being that in honor of his work on the G.I. Joe comics, Hasbro used his face as the basis for the G.I. Joe action figure Dragonsky.

In 2006 and 2007, Jerwa began writing for Dynamite Entertainment, working on the series Highlander, cowriting the first four issues with Michael Avon Oeming before moving on to a prolific run on Battlestar Galactica.

On Free Comic Book Day 2007, Jerwa met several people affiliated with DC Comics, including Eric S. Trautmann and Greg Rucka. Jerwa and Trautmann struck up a partnership and collaborated on a project called Wide Awake, which appeared first as a short story in Popgun Vol. 2, then as a Free Comic Book Day special, and then later as a free webcomic. In 2009, the duo pitched an idea for a graphic novel to DC's imprint Vertigo, which was accepted, and soon after Jerwa was contacted about working with DC directly.

Jerwa's first work for DC Comics was in September 2009 as the writer of the Inferno co-feature in The Shield, a monthly series that introduced re-imagined versions of the Red Circle Comics superhero characters into the DC Universe.

In late 2009, Jerwa also wrote for a Dynamite series based on Stargate SG-1.

In 2011 Jerwa raised $19,000 through the crowdfunding website Kickstarter for a comic book-themed documentary title UNTOLD TALES OF THE COMIC INDUSTRY. According to a post to the project's Kickstarter on May 1, 2021, the Kickstarter pledges began being fulfilled. The post apologetically details the project's ten-year-long delay, promising to fulfill product shipments and to provide later updates with an option for digital video download.

== Bibliography ==
- G.I. Joe: Frontline #11–14, 16 (writer, Devil's Due Publishing, 2003)
- G.I. Joe: A Real American Hero Vol 2 #23–43 (writer, Devil's Due Publishing, 2003–2005)
- G.I. Joe: Master & Apprentice #1–4 (writer, Devil's Due Publishing, 2004)
- Devil's Due Free Comic Book Day 2005 (writer, Devil's Due Publishing, 2005)
- G.I. Joe: Master & Apprentice II #1–4 (writer, Devil's Due Publishing, 2005)
- G.I. Joe: Snake Eyes Declassified #1–6 (writer, Devil's Due Publishing, 2005)
- Highlander #0–12 (writer, Dynamite Entertainment, 2006–2007)
- Battlestar Galactica: Pegasus #1 (writer, Dynamite Entertainment, 2007)
- Battlestar Galactica: Zarek #1–4 (writer, Dynamite Entertainment, 2007)
- HOPE: New Orleans (writer, Ronin Studios, 2007)
- Savage Tales #4 (writer, Dynamite Entertainment, 2007)
- Eva: Daughter of the Dragon #1 (writer, Dynamite Entertainment, 2007)
- Dynamite Entertainment Free Comic Book Day 2007 #1 (writer, Dynamite Entertainment, 2007)
- Battlestar Galactica: Season Zero #0–12 (writer, Dynamite Entertainment, 2007–2008)
- PopGun Volume 2 (writer with Eric S. Trautmann, Image Comics, 2008)
- Battlestar Galactica: Ghosts #1–4 (writer, Dynamite Entertainment, 2008–2009)
- Xena/Army of Darkness: What, Again? #1–4 (writer with Elliott R. Serrano, Dynamite Entertainment, 2008–2009)
- Highlander Origins: The Kurgan #1–2 (writer, Dynamite Entertainment, 2009)
- The Shield #1–5 (writer, DC Comics, 2009–2010)
