= Highlander: The Animated Series =

1994 French animated television series

- Genre: Action; Adventure; Drama; Science fantasy
- Created by: Serge Rosenzweig
- Based on: Characters by Gregory Widen
- Directed by: Frederic Dybowski
- Voices of: Miklos Perlus; Lawrence Bayne; Katie Zegers; Don Dickinson; Ben Campbell; Lorne Kennedy; Wayne Robson
- Composers: Ramon Pipin; Hervé Lavandier
- Country of origin: France
- Original language: English
- No. of seasons: 2
- No. of episodes: 40

Production
- Executive producers: Christian Charret; Marc du Pontavice; Peter Davis; Bill Panzer
- Producer: Marc du Pontavice
- Running time: 22 minutes
- Production company: Gaumont Télévision

Original release
- Network: USA Network (1994–1995); Syndication (Amazin' Adventures) (1995–1996); M6 (M6 Kid)
- Release: September 18, 1994 – January 5, 1996

Highlander: The Animated Series is an English-language French animated television series based on the Highlander franchise, which premiered on September 18, 1994. It is a loose spin-off and sequel of the 1986 film of the same name. The series was produced by Gaumont Télévision, as its first animated production (the team would soon eventually evolve into Gaumont Multimédia, and later Xilam) with the worldwide distribution rights owned by Bohbot Entertainment (later BKN International).

== Plot ==
The series is set in the far future of the 27th century. The last living descendant of the original Highlander fights against the evil dictator Kortan.

The story unfolds on post-apocalyptic Earth, after a meteorite collision nearly wipes out all human civilization after setting off nuclear weapons. Following this catastrophe, Connor MacLeod (the protagonist of the original film) and the other Immortals forswear the Game of fighting each other until only one Immortal remains to win the Prize. Instead, the Immortals swear to preserve human knowledge and help humanity. They cast away their swords and call themselves Jettators (from the French word jette, "thrown away").

But one Immortal, Kortan, refuses to swear the oath, he still seeks the Prize and now wishes to dominate the world. Connor challenges Kortan to a duel and is vanquished and killed, as any Immortal who breaks the oath is destined to die. However, with Connor's death comes the prophecy of the rise of a new Immortal, unbound by the oath, who will defeat Kortan. Uncontested by the Jettators and nigh-unkillable by mortals, Kortan establishes an empire controlling most of the planet, which he rules from his fortress Mogonda.

Seven hundred years later, a Highland youth named Quentin is killed trying to defend his clan, the Dundee, from Kortan's slavers. He is the prophesied Immortal and returns to life. His dying mother reveals his true identity to be Quentin MacLeod from Clan MacLeod, "The Last of the MacLeods". Quentin meets the Jetattor Don Vincente Marino Ramirez, who becomes his mentor. Ramirez teaches Quentin about Immortals and his mission to confront Kortan, and trains him in combat.

Accompanied by Ramirez, his adoptive sister Clyde, and their pet Gaul, Quentin seeks out the Jettators to gain their Quickening and their knowledge, not by beheading, but by a sharing as MacLeod and the Jettator grasp the same sword simultaneously (although the effects are sometimes just as destructive to the surrounding area). In the wake of a sharing, the Jettator becomes mortal and often his or her sword shatters to signify this. With the wisdom of Ramírez and the Quickenings of the Jettators, Quentin may be able to destroy Kortan.

Despite being redesigned to attract a younger audience, the show was surprisingly mature/violent; it was not uncommon for minor characters to die, and while Quentin took other Immortals' power and knowledge without also taking their lives, Kortan still did it the old way, by beheading them. In addition, though essentially a good-versus-evil scenario, most of the characters on both sides were more than just black-and-white heroes and villains. Many of Kortan's henchmen are shown to have good characteristics and feelings, and on occasion, even Quentin will be tempted by greed and be selfish, especially when offered the chances of immense power. Of course, ultimately, his good side always wins through. Some episodes involve Jettators making use of a loophole in their oath to challenge Kortan regardless, such as Matsuda, who built a cyborg to fight Kortan in his stead, or Cornell, who changed his name to Orion to be able to fight Kortan.

== Characters ==
=== Protagonists ===
- Quentin MacLeod: The titular character of the series. Raised by the Dundee clan, he was killed by Arak and subsequently resurrected as an Immortal, when Kortan sought to capture the Dundee. He usually fights with the sword that belonged to Connor MacLeod, but also carries a boomerang he is quite skilled with.
- Don Vincente Marino Ramírez: The Jettator tasked with guiding Quentin and making sure the other Jettators keep their oath. He trains Quentin in the art of combat as well as philosophy and some history. Many episodes feature flashbacks of his life.
- Clyde of the Dundee: Quentin's adoptive younger sister, though raised as his blood relative. She often ends up in danger during missions but on occasion, serves as a distraction.
- Gaul: Clyde's pet Gran, a hybrid of ape and canine. Like all Grans, Gaul is highly intelligent and is very protective of both Clyde and Quentin. His animal sense sometimes helps Quentin in dangerous situations.

=== Notable villains ===
- Kortan: One of the only three Immortals not to take the Oath, declared himself the winner of the Game and took control of the Earth. He rules from his city fortress of Mogonda, which is built like an arcology.
- Arak: Kortan's major and leader of their other soldiers, the Hunters. He mortally wounded Quentin's adoptive mother and killed Quentin, triggering his immortality. His left eye and hand are cybernetic. In the episode "The Secret Prison", it is revealed that he was born "RY407."
- Malone: A former mime, serves as the "human key" to Kortan's weapons locker and court jester. His original memories were erased by Kortan's "oblivion chamber" device. Despite his childish behavior, he can be quite cunning. And despite everything else, he appears to be consistently loyal to Kortan.
- Gorth: Another of Kortan's favoured and loyal army leaders, leading a number of strong slaves who duel as Gladiators. Gorth is a skilled swordsman, and during an angry dispute with Arak, Gorth shows that he is able to match Arak not only in terms of leadership, but also on a level of physical combat.
- Asklepios: Leader of the Bureaucrats, #76, of Mogonda, a brilliant scientist. He has a rivalry with Arak; the two are constantly trying to show up one another to gain Kortan's favor.
- Valka: Bureaucrat #28, helped Asklepios set up a spy network, implied to be in love with Asklepious.
- Kirk: Another officer in Kortan's army, he is the keeper of Kortan's colony of tamed Anomas (giant ants). In the episode "Revenge Of The Shantytown", he launches an attack on the rebels living in the slums around Magonda, prompting them to return the favour by setting wild Anomas loose in the city's lower levels. Attempting to send his own ants to fight them off, he is killed when his 'pets' join the wild ones, turning on their old master and half devouring him.
- Mohar: The fearless leader of a remaining small group of ruthless bounty hunters living in the desert, who are historical adversaries of the Dundee clan from which Quentin came. They occupy The Iron City, a giant abandoned aircraft carrier in The Dry Sea. The Iron City is used as a Holy place by Mohar's gang alongside a group of Imams/Priests, where they collectively worship their most sacred weapon - the last of a batch of hand-held Browning Heavy Machine Guns, or "The Brown" as Mohar refers to the gun. Despite being an enemy of MacLeod, Mohar similarly has the goal of eventually challenging and killing Kortan, and taking Kortan's place in Magonda as ruler of the Planet.

=== Jettators ===
- Don Vincente Marino Ramírez: 3000 year-old Immortal, tasked with training and guiding the Highlander and enforcing the Jettators' Oath. If any Jettator betrays the Oath, Ramírez must kill them.
- Mangus: Possesses the knowledge of architecture, and is the apparent leader of the Jettators. It was he who informed Kortan of the Highlander's coming seven centuries ago. Kortan then stole his blueprints and used them to build his city of Mogonda, where Mangus continued to hide out and spy on the enemy. When Quentin arrived to rescue the Dundees, he let them into the city through the sewers, but only by sacrificing himself in a duel and allowing Kortan to steal his powers was he able to ensure their escape.
- Yashoda: The greatest of the Jettators. He leads a monastic life teaching people martial arts. His knowledge is key to using that of the others to defeat Kortan, but he tests Quentin's ability to resist corruption by having a disciple manipulate Quentin, and judges that he has not yet earned the right to have Yashoda's knowledge, but promises to reconsider if Quentin matures.
- Stevenson: An enigmatic immortal with the knowledge of hydroelectric power. In a desperate attempt to save his eternal life, he betrayed the Highlander and instigated a plan to hand him over to Kortan. When he failed, however, Kortan killed him and stole his knowledge for himself.
- Ilrick: A Jettator with the knowledge of medicine.
- Erol: A Jettator with knowledge of oil, dynamite and other secrets of the Earth. He went into hiding to avoid Kortan's henchmen. When the Highlander arrived at his old base they found only Melvyn, an insane ex-employee driven crazy by the loss of his daughter Dana. Believing MacLeod's sister Clyde to be Dana, he promptly captured her, thankfully Quentin was able to locate the real Dana inside the city of Mogonda and so save them all. He was only seen in a short flashback of Melvyn.
- Lanzelet: A Jettator with the knowledge of history. His name is a German language version of Lancelot.
- Olak: The Jettator of the winds. At first, he refuses to hand over his knowledge when Quentin's fear of heights places the son of one of his men in serious danger in duel within the city of Mogonda. When Quentin is able to overcome that fear and rescue the boy from certain death above a pit of giant ants ("Anomas"). However, he reconsiders. His "quickening" ritual is the first we see on screen.
- Volta: A Jettator with the knowledge of nuclear power. He is disfigured due to radiation (he has blue skin).
- Eva: A woman with the knowledge of how to create and project holograms.
- Orane: A blue-haired woman who rules an undersea city and has knowledge of oceanography. Implied to be an old lover of Ramirez.
- Fredrickson: Knowledge of genetics. He cloned himself to preserve his knowledge in case Kortan found him, but his clone turned evil. The cloned Fredrickson was eventually killed while fighting Quentin. but because it was indirect (or perhaps because he was a clone), there was no Quickening.
- Matsuda: An Asian Jettator with a knowledge of cyborgs (more properly androids, as his creations were merely artificial machines). He lost a hand to Kortan, and built a cyborg warrior to kill Kortan for him.
- Mahata: An old man with knowledge of entomology.
- Branagh: Has knowledge of linguistics. After his cowardice, he found courage when the woman he was in love with was kidnapped by Arak, one of Kortan's men.
- Cornell: A blind Jettator with knowledge of astronomy. He changed his name to Orion and hoped to fight Kortan during an eclipse, where he would have the advantage. However, he had given up his knowledge and immortality to Quentin before then, and stood no chance against a powerful immortal like Kortan because he also lost the enhanced senses he had developed during his time as an Immortal.
- Sehebi: A Jettator with a master of botany. In the episode in which he appears, The Valley of the Thorn Pods, he is initially thought to be a traitor to the Order of the Jettators for unleashing carnivorous thorn pods on the Valley where he lived; later it was revealed that he was not responsible, and was in fact helpful in stopping the pods. His Quickening ritual is the one we see on the opening credits.
- Sheperd: A Jettator with knowledge of satellites. He did not take the oath because he thought that he was the reason for the great catastrophe. Hiding in his satellite station, he searched for the Highlander and Ramírez and passed his knowledge to Quentin just as Kortan found them.
- Prometheus: A Jettator with knowledge of the atom. His body suffers from intense radiation poisoning, thus turning his immortality into a curse. At first, Quentin refused his knowledge until Ramirez intervened and convinced Quentin that such knowledge was better off in his hands than that of Kortan. Prometheus died after destroying his own fortress to protect his secrets.
- Emerson: An immortal who found a source of invisibility. He was the third immortal who did not take the oath (the others were Kortan and Shepard) because Kortan sent him to outer space before the meteorite hit the Earth. He returned to Earth after spending more than 700 years in space. Originally a friend, Kortan killed him in order to gain the knowledge he had accumulated off-world.

=== Creatures ===
Several strange creatures exist in the universe of Highlander: The Animated Series.

- Anomas: Gigantic ants the size of an elephant; they are highly aggressive and used in Mogonda to perform executions. Wild Anomas have special glands that produce a paralytic acid. Like normal (real-life) ants, they communicate through pheromones and rubbing antenne. The hermit Zack learned to speak to the Anomas and artificially create their pheromones so they would not attack him.
- Gavors: Ostrich-like reptiles used as mounts, shown to be about as intelligent as horses.
- Grans: Creatures that are part ape and part canine. Highly intelligent Grans are capable of tool use and even complex planning. The Grans communicate with one another through sign language and understand human speech. Wild Grans are shown to distrust both humans and domesticated Grans.
- Snow Spider: Large fuzzy blue arachnids, about the size of house cats, non-poisonous.
- Thorn Pods: Flesh-eating flowers capable of movement. They have a fragrance that induces sleep, Thorn Pods can consume humans.
- Gorans: Elephant/bovine hybrids that act as beasts of burden, doing heavy work and moving useful supplies from place to place for humans.

== Production ==
Marc du Pontavice suggested to Bill Panzer and Peter Davis, who became his friends, that they adapt Highlander as an animated series for children, and they responded enthusiastically. The contract was signed, and du Pontavice secured an agreement with the band Queen to use the film's music, whose financing was also arranged. In December 1993, the series was formally announced to consist of 52 episodes at a cost of $320,000 per episode. However, the animation budget was high, and he opted for a large number of 40 half-hour episodes, at an estimated cost of 72 million francs. M6, the channel that aired Highlander: The Series, became involved with the animated version. Gaumont's international sales department, which believed in the potential of the Highlander animated show, also strongly supported Pontavice. He entered the American market, which brought him substantial funding.

Initially, du Pontavice had no intention of opening an animation studio, as he wanted to focus on creation and visiting existing studios, such as Ellipse Programme, directed by Philippe Grimond. Philippe saw du Pontavice arriving disguised as an ignorant young producer, also backed by Gaumont, who presented a budget and schedule incompatible with the demands of the American distributor, Bohbot Entertainment. Since the other studios had similar requirements, du Pontavice began to panic, but Jean-Yves Raimbaud, Marc's first hired artist, reassured him and convinced him that they could do it themselves and set up the studio themselves. They assembled a team of almost 40 artists in a few weeks. Gaumont, not without apprehension, installed them near their headquarters in Neuilly-sur-Seine, in a two-story building with an outdoor terrace.

By early 1994, they were already operational, and du Pontavice thought Raimbaud would take over the direction, but he had no intention of fulfilling such an order and only wanted to dedicate himself to the development of his own series, Space Goofs. He suggested replacing him with a young artist who had tried to convince du Pontavice by offering to storyboard the first episode, but failed to persuade him. Du Pontavice never studied storyboarding in his life, but his wife Alix de Maistre taught him some technical concepts, and thanks to her teachings, du Pontavice quickly acquired a strong instinct when it came to directing and spontaneously understood the role of editing in storytelling. As his first act as a producer and his first act of intransigence, he rejected Raimbaud's idea and proposed the direction to Frédéric Dybowski, whose mastery of layout made him a good candidate.

Du Pontavice currently has some difficulty watching the episodes of the animated series, and a large part of the production was lost due to a lack of preparation for the subcontracting of animation to the Hahn Shin studio, but he is particularly proud of the animated series' visuals, noting the backgrounds being painted to simulate 3D effects. Due to the series' success, Gaumont Multimédia was created a year later shortly after a meeting with Patrice Ledoux in March of that year.

== Episodes ==
=== Season 1 ===
No. overall	No. in season	Title	Jettator
1	1	"The Last of the MacLeods"	Mangus
2	2	"A Taste of Betrayal"	Stevenson
3	3	"The Last Weapon"	--
4	4	"Melvyn the Magnificent"	Erol
5	5	"The Sound of Madness"	--
6	6	"The Suspended Village"	Olak
7	7	"Exodus"	--
8	8	"The Cursed"	Ilrick
9	9	"The History Lesson"	Lanzelet
10	10	"The Valley of the Thorn Pods"	Sehebi
11	11	"Fallout"	Promethos
12	12	"The Courage of Love"	Branagh
13	13	"The Setup"	Yoshoda

=== Season 2 ===
No. overall	No. in season	Title	Jettator
14	1	"The Sword of Evil"	--
15	2	"The Eye of Heaven"	Sheperd
16	3	"The Price of Freedom"	--
17	4	"The Treasure in the Sand"	--
18	5	"Orane"	Orane
19	6	"The Secret Prison"	--
20	7	"Dead Ringer"	--
21	8	"Orion's Reign"	Cornell
22	9	"Rage of the Hurricane"	--
23	10	"Oblivion"	--
24	11	"Lord for a Day"	Volta
25	12	"The Siege of the Dundees"	--
26	13	"The Blood of My Enemy"	--
27	14	"Valka"	--
28	15	"The Survivors from Outer Space"	Emerson
29	16	"King of the Ants"	--
30	17	"Eagle Valley"	--
31	18	"Isle of Grans"	--
32	19	"The Revenge of the Shantytown"	Mahata
33	20	"Trick of the Light"	Eva
34	21	"The Double"	Fredrickson
35	22	"Cult of the Immortal"	--
36	23	"Playing with Fire"	--
37	24	"Tricks of the Mind"	--
38	25	"Matsuda"	Matsuda
39	26	"Ice Dwellers"	--
40	27	"Countdown"	--

== Staff ==
- Scriptwriters: Francoise Charpiat, Yves Coulon, Sophie Decroisette, Patrick Gallano, Michael Goffard, Frédéric Lenoir, Beatrice Marthouret, Claude Prothée, Serge Rozenzweig

== Cast ==
- Miklos Perlus – Quentin MacLeod
- Ben Campbell – Ramirez
- Lawrence Bayne – Kortan
- Katie Zegers – Clyde
- Don Dickinson – Arak, Frederickson
- Lorne Kennedy – Malone, Connor MacLeod
- Wayne Robson – Asklepios, Glen
- Hrant Alianak – Sahevy
- Graham Haley – Mangus, Erol
- Tracey Moore – Ave
- James Rankin – Stevenson, Mohar
- Stuart Stone – Young Quentin
- Alyson Court – Aria
- John Gilbert – Melvyn
- David Hemblen – Gorth, Olak
- Catherine Disher – Teen
- Dawn Greenhalgh – Petra
- Cedric Smith – Scott
- David Bryant – Lanzelet
- Colin Fox – Cubert
- Denis Akiyama – Yashoda
- Michael Fletcher

== Spin-offs ==
A video game based on the series called Highlander: The Last of the MacLeods was released for the Atari Jaguar CD.

== Broadcast ==
The series was broadcast in the United States on the USA Network on Sundays beginning September 18, 1994 while also airing concurrently in broadcast syndication. The series premiered in Brazil first through Anima Mundi in its third edition, which took place between August 12 and 20, 1995, through the distributor Synapse.

== Home media ==
Some episodes of the series were edited into a feature-length film called Highlander: The Adventure Begins and was released by Family Home Entertainment in 1996.

Genius Products released Highlander: The Animated Series on DVD in Region 1 on December 4, 2007.

Discotek Media released the series on Blu-ray on July 29, 2025.

DVD name	Ep #	Release date
The Complete Series	40	December 4, 2007
