= Highlander (franchise) =

Media franchise (1986–2007)

- Created by: Gregory Widen
- Original work: Highlander (1986)
- Owner: StudioCanal
- Years: 1986–present

Print publications
- Novels: List of novels
- Comics: Highlander (2006–2007); Highlander: Way of the Sword (2007–2008); Highlander Origins: The Kurgan (2009); Highlander 3030 (2015); Highlander: The American Dream (2017)

Films and television
- Films: Highlander (1986); Highlander II: The Quickening (1991); Highlander III: The Sorcerer (1994); Highlander: Endgame (2000); Highlander: The Search for Vengeance (2007); Highlander (TBA)
- Television series: Highlander: The Series (1992–1998); Highlander: The Raven (1998–1999)
- Web series: The Methos Chronicles (2001)
- Animated series: Highlander: The Animated Series (1994–1996)
- Television film: Highlander: The Source (2007)

Games
- Traditional: Highlander: The Card Game (1995)
- Video games: Highlander (1986); Highlander: The Last of the MacLeods (1995)

Audio
- Soundtracks: List of soundtracks
- Original music: "A Kind of Magic" (1986)
- Audio plays: List of audio plays

Highlander is an American media franchise created by Gregory Widen. The series began with Highlander, a 1986 fantasy film starring Christopher Lambert, who played Connor MacLeod, the eponymous Highlander. There have been four theatrical Highlander films, one made-for-TV film, two live-action television series, an animated television series, an anime film, original novels, comic books, and various licensed merchandise.

The main character of the series, Connor MacLeod, was born in Glenfinnan in the Scottish Highlands in the 16th century, and is one of a number of immortals empowered by an energy called the Quickening and only able to die if beheaded. Other immortal protagonists from the MacLeod clan were introduced over time, including Duncan MacLeod, Quentin MacLeod and Colin MacLeod, each of whom exists in their own timelines.

On television, Highlander: The Series aired for six seasons from 1992 to 1998, starring Adrian Paul as Connor's kinsman Duncan MacLeod, another immortal Highlander born decades later. Recurring characters in the series included the immortal thief Amanda (Elizabeth Gracen) and oldest immortal Methos (Peter Wingfield) who each had spin-off shows, Highlander: The Raven and The Methos Chronicles respectively, which each lasted one season.

Highlander story chronology
Highlander
II: The Quickening	III: The Sorcerer	The Series; The Methos Chronicles; The Raven; Endgame; The Source
The Search for Vengeance; The Animated Series		The Series; The Methos Chronicles; The Raven; Endgame; The Source

== Films ==
=== Highlander (1986) ===
The original film Highlander, directed by Russell Mulcahy, was released on March 7, 1986, with the tagline "There Can Be Only One". The film features a number of flashback scenes establishing the early history of Connor MacLeod (Christopher Lambert) of the Clan MacLeod. After dying on the battlefield in 1536 and returning to life fully healed, Connor is mentored by an Egyptian swordsman calling himself Juan Sánchez-Villalobos Ramírez (Sean Connery). The young Highlander learns he and others are among a rare number of humans born throughout history in different parts of the world who possess the "Quickening", a power that connects them to nature, leaves them unable to have children, and makes them ageless and unable to die unless beheaded. Immortals can absorb the Quickening of another by taking their head, and so many battle one another in mortal combat to increase their power. Ramírez says that one day when only a few remain they will be pulled to a "faraway land" and fight in the Gathering, where the final survivor will take the Prize: the collected power of all immortals who ever lived, enough power to enslave humanity.

In the film's present-day story, the Gathering is occurring in 1985 in New York City where MacLeod lives as an antique dealer, working alongside his adopted daughter Rachel. The Highlander must ensure the Prize is not won by The Kurgan (Clancy Brown), the same ruthless immortal who once hunted him and killed Ramírez centuries before. As the final battle draws near, MacLeod reflects on his life with his adopted daughter Rachel Ellenstein (Sheila Gish) and meets a new love, forensics scientist Brenda Wyatt (Roxanne Hart).

The film was titled Shadow Clan and Princes of the Universe in the earliest drafts. Upon its release, the film was not a financial success and was poorly reviewed by critics, but it gained a strong cult following, was a hit internationally, and is regarded by many as the best film in the series.

The original orchestral score was composed by Michael Kamen. Queen produced and performed the soundtrack, released as the album A Kind of Magic (a reference to a line used by Connor in the film to explain his ability to survive death). Sounds from the soundtrack were also used in Highlander: The Series, and the track, "Princes of the Universe" became the theme song for the show's opening title introduction.

The film grossed $12.9 million worldwide, with $5.9 million in the United States and Canada.

=== Highlander II: The Quickening (1991) ===
Highlander II: The Quickening was initially directed by Russell Mulcahy. Filming was done almost entirely in Argentina. After the country's economy crashed, the film's investors took direct control of the film, removing Mulcahy and his creative influence while altering the story. Released on November 1, 1991, the film mainly takes place in 2024, with flashbacks to events on Earth in the 1990s and also the planet Zeist "500 years ago". The film offers an origin story for immortals, depicting Ramírez and MacLeod as alien revolutionaries of Zeist who oppose the corrupt rulers and General Katana (Michael Ironside). Ramírez and MacLeod, who share a bond due to a magic called "the Quickening", are then exiled to Earth along with others. On Earth they become immortal and are forced to kill each other until only one is left alive. The winner will have a choice: to become mortal and live out their life on Earth or return to Zeist now pardoned of all crimes. This origin story contradicts the age and history of Ramírez in the first film, Connor's childhood growing up in Scotland, and the circumstances of how the two first met, but no explanation is offered for these contradictions. Highlander II also does not explain why MacLeod no longer seems to have access to the power he won at the end of the previous film, which allowed him to know the thoughts and dreams of all living people. Only the mortality he earned is mentioned.

In the film's main story, the ozone layer deteriorates and many are killed by solar radiation by 1994, including Brenda Wyatt (now said to be Connor's wife). In 1999, MacLeod supervises a team that creates an energy shield across the planet. Earth is protected but can no longer see the sky or natural sunlight. By 2024, humanity is largely in despair as society is overwhelmed by violence and crime. The shield is now under control of The Shield Corporation (TSC), which charges countries heavily for its protection. Having won the Prize in 1985, MacLeod became mortal and has physically aged into a frail old man. Worried the Highlander may still return to Zeist, Katana sends immortal henchmen after him. MacLeod defends himself and his attackers die, their immortal energies restoring his youth. He allies with Louise Marcus (Virginia Madsen), a political radical who knows the ozone has healed and that TSC is covering up the truth in order to continue profits. Joining them is Ramírez, whom MacLeod summons back to life through their magical bond. They fight Katana and free Earth from the shield.

When Highlander II was released in 1991, it was poorly reviewed by critics worldwide, and is considered to be one of the worst films ever made. Russell Mulcahy was disappointed with the film and later made his own Renegade Version director's cut by re-editing the footage and removing all verbal reference to the immortals being aliens from a planet called Zeist. The Zeist footage was repurposed as a flashback to an ancient, technologically advanced civilization that existed on Earth before recorded history (the name and location of this civilization is not said). MacLeod and Ramírez were said to have been members of this ancient society and it is stated that they, along with Katana and others, are once again rare human beings born with their immortality. While the film still shows Ramírez wielding a form of magic, it is no longer called the Quickening. The rulers of this ancient society banished the immortal revolutionaries and criminals to different points in the future, allowing Ramírez to be sent to ancient Egypt while MacLeod becomes a Highlander in 16th century Scotland, the two of them reuniting later. It is said the winner of the Prize can either become mortal and live out their life "in the future" or choose to return to their original civilization in the distant past.

In 2004, a Special Edition was released, featuring several distinct alterations, including new computer-generated visual effects throughout the film (and changing the Shield from red to dark blue as originally intended). Though many fans regarded the Renegade Version and Special Edition as being better than the original film, the general reception was still somewhat mixed.

=== Highlander III: The Sorcerer (1994) ===
Highlander III: The Sorcerer (alternatively titled Highlander: The Final Dimension) was released in late 1994 in the Philippines and the United Kingdom and on January 27, 1995, in the United States. It is a direct sequel to the original film, ignoring and contradicting the story of Highlander II. Following Brenda Wyatt's death in a car crash in 1987, MacLeod is living in Marrakesh with his adopted son John. In 1994, he is hunted by the warrior Kane (Mario Van Peebles) who missed the original Gathering because he was buried deep in a Japanese cave by magic, isolating him from the Game. Having killed and absorbed the power of MacLeod's second teacher, the sorcerer Nakano (Mako), Kane is a master of illusion. Realizing there are other immortals again, Connor returns to New York to ensure Kane does not win the Prize. Along the way, he finds a new love, archaeologist Dr. Alex Johnson (Deborah Unger) who resembles a woman MacLeod loved during the French Revolution. Kane kidnaps John and lures MacLeod to a final battle in New Jersey. MacLeod wins and leaves to start a new life with John and Alex.

The film grossed $36.7 million worldwide, with $13.7 million in the United States and Canada. Critics claim that it was little more than rehash of the first film.

=== Highlander: Endgame (2000) ===
Highlander: Endgame was released to theaters on September 1, 2000. Rather than a direct sequel in the Highlander film franchise, it followed the continuity of the Highlander: The Series, acting as a franchise bridge by starring both previous film protagonist Connor MacLeod and TV series protagonist Duncan MacLeod. In the canon of the TV series, the events of the original Highlander film still took place but the Prize was not won because many immortals still lived on Earth in 1985. The series protagonist Duncan is introduced in the first episode as another immortal of the Clan MacLeod who was born decades after Connor left the clan. Christopher Lambert appeared as Connor in the first episode, revealed to have been Duncan's teacher in the ways of immortals.

Taking place in the present day, the film's antagonist is Jacob Kell (Bruce Payne), an evil immortal who ignores the rules of the Game. Kell holds a centuries-old grudge against Connor MacLeod and kills his adopted daughter Rachel Ellenstein when he bombs their old antique shop in New York City. Following Rachel's death, Connor is disillusioned with life and spends a decade in a hidden fortress known as the Sanctuary. When Kell discovers the Sanctuary ten years later, Connor and Duncan join forces against him. Believing neither of them can defeat Kell alone, Connor, tired of his immortal life, insists he be killed by Duncan so the younger MacLeod may possess their combined power. Duncan reluctantly does so and defeats Kell.

Critical reaction to Highlander: Endgame was negative. It holds a 11% "rotten" rating on Rotten Tomatoes, based on 52 reviews, higher than Highlander II and Highlander III, both of which hold ratings of 5% or lower, and a score of 21 out of 100 on Metacritic, based on 16 reviews.

The film was a box office bomb, managing to garner $15 million of its $25 million budget. The film opened at #3, grossing $5,067,331 in the opening weekend. It went on to gross $12,811,858 domestically and gather $3,031,750 from foreign markets for a worldwide total of $15,843,608. The film however sold better when it was released on DVD. This prompted the producers to release the director's cut version of the film, adding new footage along with better special effects and audio tracks, and re-editing certain parts of the story. The reception to the director's cut was mixed but better than the overall fan reception to the theatrical release.

=== Highlander: The Source (2007) ===
Highlander: The Source premiered on the Sci Fi Channel on September 15, 2007, and continues the canon of Highlander: The Series, taking place several years after Endgame. The film takes place in a future version of Earth where human society has descended into violence and chaos. Duncan MacLeod and a group of allies seek an energy well in Eastern Europe that may be the legendary Source of immortality, all while fighting the Guardian (Cristian Solimeno), an immortal empowered with superhuman abilities. The story and the mythology of the Source were meant to be expanded on with future films, but reception to The Source was largely negative and plans for follow-up stories were canceled. A 2008 short film called "Reunion", written by TV series producer David Abramowitz and directed by Don Paonessa, featured the series characters but did not acknowledge the events of Highlander: The Source. At the Highlander Worldwide Convention the next year, Abramowitz and others from the TV series referred to Highlander: The Source as a "bad dream" Duncan had. The same year, Big Finish Productions released officially licensed Highlander: The Series audio plays that contradicted the events of The Source.

=== Highlander (TBA) ===
In 2008, Summit Entertainment bought the franchise's rights, with the intention to remake the original 1986 film. Writers Art Marcum and Matt Holloway and producer Peter Davis were attached to the project at one point. Justin Lin signed on to direct the remake. The film's reported title is Highlander: The Reckoning.

Producer Neal H. Moritz said in an interview that they want to stay true to the mythologies as a whole of the Highlander series, acknowledging that there are certain things between all the different Highlanders, but to stay faithful in what the original film delivered, while presenting the new version for old and new fans of the franchise.

Twilight series writer Melissa Rosenberg was attached to write Highlander script in 2011. Justin Lin was still attached to direct, but in August, Lin dropped out of the film due to commitments to other projects.

In 2012, director Juan Carlos Fresnadillo later signed on to direct the remake. Vinnie Jones and Ray Stevenson were rumored for the role of The Kurgan. Ryan Reynolds was confirmed to play Connor MacLeod. Later in December, Fresnadillo left the project due to creative differences and Reynolds also dropped out of the film.

Highlander: The Series writer and executive producer David Abramowitz was reported to polish the film's script in 2013. Cedric Nicolas-Troyan was hired to direct in October. The following year in November, the studio wanted actor Tom Cruise in the role of Ramírez, but Cruise was busy shooting Mission: Impossible – Rogue Nation and was reportedly not considering future projects at that time. James Jaysen Bryhan was rumored to play Ramírez.

Wrestler turned actor Dave Bautista was cast as The Kurgan in February 2015. Nicolas-Troyan was still involved with the reboot, but later in November 2016, Chad Stahelski was confirmed to direct, and Ryan J. Condal was brought for the script. The reboot was in "heavy development mode" since June 2020.

Henry Cavill was in talks to have a lead role in the reboot as of May 2021, but his role was unknown at the time until two years later. In June 2025, Russell Crowe signed on in the role of Ramirez.

In autumn of 2023, Lionsgate, owner of Summit Entertainment, was moving forward with the reboot, with Cavill starring as MacLeod and Stahelski still attached to direct from a screenplay by Mike Finch. The budget of the film is reportedly over $100 million and producers on the project include Joshua Davis, Moritz, Stahelski and Louise Rosner. Lionsgate intended to sell the film to international distributors at the 2023 American Film Market and filming was expected to begin in early 2024. In April 2025, Amazon MGM Studios and Scott Stuber acquired the reboot under the United Artists banner. Karen Gillan was cast as Heather that August, while Drew McIntyre joined a month later as MacLeod's brother Angus.

== Animated film ==
=== Highlander: The Search for Vengeance (2007) ===
In 2007, an anime film, Highlander: The Search for Vengeance was released, featuring the immortal Colin MacLeod in the year 2187. The film exists in its own continuity, separate from the live-action films and TV shows. The story largely takes place in a post-apocalyptic version of Earth and implies immortals can use their power to achieve superhuman speed and strength.

== Television ==
=== Highlander: The Series (1992–1998) ===
In 1992, a television spin-off was developed, entitled Highlander: The Series. It was shown in syndication from October 3, 1992, to May 16, 1998. The series was an offshoot of the 1986 feature film but with one major difference: immortals still exist post-1985. The first episode of season 2 confirmed the events of the original Highlander film still happened in the TV series continuity but that Connor's battle with the Kurgan was not the Gathering and he did not win the Prize, since in this version there were many other immortals still alive on Earth in 1985. The series introduced the Watchers, an organization of mortals who observe and record the lives of immortals.

Adrian Paul starred as Duncan MacLeod, another immortal from the same clan as Connor, born decades later. Soon after Duncan realizes he is immortal, Connor finds him and trains him for years before they both part ways. Christopher Lambert reprised his role as Connor MacLeod for the first episode and was mentioned again in several subsequent episodes. The series originally featured Alexandra Vandernoot as Duncan's love Tessa Noël and Stan Kirsch as his young friend Richie Ryan. Other series regulars included Philip Akin as Charlie DeSalvo, Jim Byrnes as Joe Dawson, Lisa Howard as Anne Lindsey, Michel Modo as the comedic character Maurice, and Peter Wingfield as the immortal Methos. Roger Daltrey of The Who made recurring appearances as Duncan's immortal friend Hugh Fitzcairn, while Elizabeth Gracen made frequent appearances as Duncan's old friend and occasional love interest Amanda Darieux, an immortal thief whose popularity led to her being the star of the spin-off series Highlander: The Raven.

Over its six-year run, the series had many notable guest stars including Joan Jett, Vanity, Richard Moll, Traci Lords, Sheena Easton, "Rowdy" Roddy Piper, Nia Peeples, Rae Dawn Chong, Eric McCormack, Sandra Bernhard, Claudia Christian and Ron Perlman. The show was co-produced in syndication by international partners including Gaumont, RTL Plus (Germany), Rysher Distribution (United States), Reteitalia Productions (Italy), Amuse Video (Japan) and TF1 (France). The series had high ratings internationally, but the ratings fell during the show's last two seasons and it ended in 1998 after six years.

=== Highlander: The Animated Series (1994–1996) ===
A 1994 animated series, Highlander: The Animated Series, was set in the 27th century on a post-apocalyptic Earth now ruled by an immortal named Kortan. The series protagonist is a young immortal named Quentin MacLeod, voiced by Miklos Perlus, who is the last of the Clan MacLeod and mentored by an immortal named Don Vincente Marino Ramírez. Connor MacLeod appeared in one episode during a flashback scene to the late 20th century, where he dies at Kortan's hand after prophesying the villain will one day be defeated by Quentin. To curb the violence, the show creates a way for immortals to willingly transfer their Quickening energy to another, allowing Quentin to rise in power without killing.

=== Highlander: The Raven (1998–1999) ===
A spin-off of Highlander: The Series, this show starred Elizabeth Gracen as the popular character Amanda Darieux, a recurring role she played in the original TV show. Previously known as a thief who often avoided confrontation and responsibility, the series showed Amanda now trying to become a better person alongside a new supporting cast of characters. Highlander: The Raven lasted one season due to low ratings and changes in how syndicated shows are marketed.

== Web series ==
=== The Methos Chronicles (2001) ===
The Methos Chronicles is an animated television series based on the character Methos, portrayed by Peter Wingfield in Highlander: The Series. The character is depicted as a 5,000-year-old immortal. Wingfield provided the voice of Methos for the animated series, which ran for a single season consisting of eight episodes.

In the early 2000s, a live-action television series centred on Methos and starring Wingfield was discussed during development, but the project did not proceed into production.

=== Highlander: Reunion (2008) ===
Amanda, Joe, and Methos get together for a private gathering before Methos' wedding ceremony to discuss a variety of topics surrounding passions for life and tragedy. This was a one-shot 17 minute short written by show writer David Abramowitz and directed by Donald Paonessa.

== Other media ==
=== Novels ===
A number of Highlander novels were released, including a novelization of the first film by Garry Kilworth and a line of books based on the television series by various authors. The 9 published Warner Books Highlander novels are:

- The Element of Fire by Jason Henderson (October 1995)
- Scimitar by Ashley McConnell (February 1996)
- Scotland the Brave by Jennifer Roberson (September 1996)
- Measure of a Man by Nancy Holder (May 1997)
- The Path by Rebecca Neason (August 1997)
- Zealot by Donna Lettow (November 1997)
- Shadow of Obsession by Rebecca Neason (June 1998)
- The Captive Soul by Josepha Sherman (August 1998)
- White Silence by Ginjer Buchanan (March 1999)

There was a 10th novel in the works entitled Barricades that was to be published in July 1999, but the author Donna Lettow fell ill before she could complete it, and by the time she had recovered, the books were no longer being published.

In 2000, An Evening at Joe's: Fiction by the Cast and Crew was published as a collection of short stories written by some of the series cast and crew members, including Peter Wingfied, Stan Kirsch, and Jim Byrnes, and edited by series writer Gillian Horvath.

=== Non-fiction ===
Non-fictional books about all or part of the Highlander franchise include:

- Highlander: The Complete Watchers Guide by Maureen Russell (1998)
- The Best of Highlander: The Book by Maureen Russell (1999)
- Fearful Symmetry: The Essential Guide to All Things Highlander by John Mosby (2015) — a guide to the Highlander films and television series, with explorations of the films and series, interviews with many of the key players in front and behind the camera.
- A Kind of Magic: Making the Original Highlander by Jonathan Melville (2020)

=== Comics ===
The Highlander comic book series from Dynamite Entertainment followed Connor MacLeod after his battle with the Kurgan in New York, adopting the television series idea that this wasn't the final battle for the Prize because many immortals still existed on Earth. It was followed by a miniseries acting as a prequel to the original film, Highlander: Way of the Sword, and a miniseries explaining the Kurgan's past before meeting Connor MacLeod, Highlander Origins: The Kurgan.

In 2015, Emerald Star Comics released Highlander 3030, written by Lennit Williams and Matt Kelly. The comic was an officially licensed story following the adventures of Duncan MacLeod in a far-off dystopian future, and even received social media support from the official Highlander account on Facebook. Highlander 3030 only had one issue digitally released and was poorly received by critics. In an interview on the podcast Ten Cent Takes, Kelly confirmed the comic had production problems, including the initial artist having to drop out due to health issues and Davis-Panzer Productions demanding replacement artist Dan Goodfellow draw the book in a style that wasn't his own. As such, the book was a financial failure and Emerald Star Comics went out of business soon after.

In 2017, IDW Publishing published the miniseries Highlander: The American Dream, which also served as a prequel to the first Highlander film.

In September 2026, Titan Comics announced solicitation for the first (of 4) issues of Highlander: The Original Screenplay, in which Gregory Widen adapts his original screenplay for the film, with artwork by Szymon Kudranski - the first issue is due to be released in December 2026. The hardcover collected edition is due to be published in July 2027.

=== Soundtracks ===
All five live-action Highlander films received soundtrack albums, as well as Highlander: The Series, with its soundtrack being released in two volumes. Highlander: The Original Scores, an album featuring music from the first three films, was released in 1995. The Best of Highlander: The Series, with a selection of songs from the series, was released in 2002.

=== Audio plays ===
Big Finish Productions temporarily held the license to produce original Highlander audio dramas. While many Big Finish products are full cast audio dramas, some involve one actor narrating the story and several parts while another actor narrates one or two other important roles. This format was followed for the Highlander audios. The first four audios star Adrian Paul as Duncan MacLeod and were released monthly starting in June 2009. The stories are set after Highlander: Endgame. In the audio Kurgan Rising, both the Kurgan and Connor MacLeod seem to return from the dead.

Big Finish released a second series of four Highlander audio stories, each based around one of the Four Horsemen: Kronos read by Valentine Pelka, Silas read by Richard Ridings, Caspian read by Marcus Testory, and Methos read by Peter Wingfield.

=== Video games ===
Highlander, a video game tie-in to the first film, was released for home computers in 1986. The player faced a few opponents from the film, each of whom had to be struck three times to be beaten. It was poorly received.

1995 saw the release of Highlander: The Last of the MacLeods, a video game based on Highlander: The Animated Series, for the Atari Jaguar CD.

A Highlander massively multiplayer online role-playing game video game was planned by Kalisto Entertainment. Following the developer's closure, rights to the Highlander video game franchise went to SCi Entertainment in 2004. The new developer decided not to release a Highlander video game. Trailers showed the game title would have been Highlander: The Gathering.

Highlander: The Game and a PC version of Highlander: The Last of the MacLeods were likewise cancelled.

=== Collectible card games ===
Highlander: The Card Game is a collectible card game produced by La Montagnard Inc., intended to simulate a sword fight between two Immortals.

== See also ==
- List of Highlander characters
