= Highlander: The Search for Vengeance =

2007 anime film by Yoshiaki Kawajiri

- Japanese film poster

Japanese name
- Kanji: ハイランダー：復讐の探索
Transcriptions
- Revised Hepburn: Hairandā: Fukushū no tansaku
- Directed by: Yoshiaki Kawajiri
- Written by: David Abramowitz
- Based on: Characters by Gregory Widen
- Produced by: Peter S. Davis; William N. Panzer; Thomas K. Gary; Galen Walker
- Starring: Shun Oguri; Koichi Yamadera; Kosei Tomita; Romi Park; Megumi Hayashibara
- Cinematography: Takaharu Ozaki
- Edited by: Satoshi Terauchi
- Music by: Jussi Tegelman; Nathan Wang
- Production companies: Imagi Animation Studios; Davis-Panzer Productions; Madhouse
- Distributed by: Go! Cinema (Japan); Manga Entertainment (International)
- Release date: June 5, 2007
- Running time: 95 minutes (Director's Cut); 85 minutes (International)
- Countries: Japan; Hong Kong; United States
- Languages: Japanese; English

Highlander: The Search for Vengeance (Japanese: ハイランダー：復讐の探索, Hepburn: Hairandā: Fukushū no tansaku) is a 2007 Japanese-American adult animated dystopian fantasy action film and an anime installment in the Highlander franchise. The film was directed by Yoshiaki Kawajiri (Ninja Scroll, Vampire Hunter D: Bloodlust) and was written by David Abramowitz, also the writer for Highlander: The Series, Highlander: The Raven and Highlander: The Source. The film was a joint venture between Imagi Animation Studios and Madhouse Studio, with Imagi providing the script and the soundtrack, while Madhouse produced the animation. It was produced in association with Davis-Panzer Productions and distributed by Manga Entertainment on June 5, 2007, and aired on July 30 on Sci Fi's Ani-Monday block. The film is dedicated to the memory of William N. Panzer, who died in 2007, and was the co-owner of Davis-Panzer Productions.

== Synopsis ==
The lead character, Colin MacLeod, became an Immortal after his first death in 125 AD in Roman Britain, when his village in England was attacked and destroyed by the conquering Romans. Another Immortal, Marcus Octavius, was leading the Roman Empire's military forces in hopes of creating his dream of a utopian society. Octavius killed Colin's wife Moya, but was not able to kill Colin, whose unconscious body was dragged by a horse to within Stonehenge, a "Holy ground" in the story, where Immortals are forbidden to fight.

Waking days later within Stonehenge, Colin is left confused about who and what he is, and why he is still alive. It is at this moment that the spirit of a former druid of this holy site, Amergan, begins communicating with MacLeod and explains to him what he is. Colin learns of The Game from Amergan, and the druid becomes his lifelong teacher and conscience, much to Colin's own chagrin.

The movie interlaces flashback scenes of this and Colin's following plight for vengeance throughout time, as Octavius attempts to re-enact his utopian society through force and fear. Throughout the next two millennia, Octavius serves as a high-ranking member of various powerful empires, ranging from the Mongol Empire to Nazi Germany. Marcus wants to encourage the development of a utopian world-empire, but the side he chooses tend to be ruthless and authoritarian (e.g. Nazi Germany). For two thousand years, Colin clashes with Marcus multiple times throughout history, always fighting on the opposing side trying to bring down whichever authoritarian regime Marcus is supporting. While Colin is often badly beaten, neither one ever succeeds in killing the other. Though Colin is ostensibly in the role of the "barbarian" and Marcus is the bringer of "civilization", Marcus cares more about building an empire and less about people's well-being, with an "ends-justify-the-means" mentality.

In the year 2187, Colin finds Octavius in a post-apocalyptic future of New York City. Octavius has stopped supporting other regimes, and is setting up a new empire with himself as its tyrannical leader. When Colin arrives, Marcus is busy making plans to release a deadly virus which will further his goals of conquest. Colin falls in with the disaffected rebels in the city. After a final duel, Colin defeats and beheads Octavius, and his Quickening destroys the virus in question.

Following the defeat of Marcus, Colin silently leaves New York for an unknown destination, with a new sense of belief and purpose other than revenge for the first time in over 2,000 years.

== Cast ==
Character	Japanese	English
Colin MacLeod	Shun Oguri	Alistair Abell
Marcus Octavius	Koichi Yamadera	Nolan North
Amergan	Kosei Tomita	Scott McNeil
Dahlia	Romi Park	Debi Mae West
Kyala	Megumi Hayashibara	Janyse Jaud
Doc	Unsho Ishizuka	Jim Byrnes
Rudy	Yusaku Yara	Jim Byrnes
Moya	Yurika Hino	Kathleen Barr
Gregor	Takaya Hashi	Scott McNeil
Lab Director	Takaya Hashi	Scott McNeil
Joe	Minami Takayama	Hank Banks
Malike	Koichi Yamadera	David B. Mitchell

== MacLeod heritage ==
In the story, Colin was born in Roman Britain, but his true surname, which is never given, was not MacLeod at birth. One of the flashback scenes shows him achieving this honor after he fought alongside Clan MacLeod in an unknown battle, presumably because Octavius was fighting for the opposition. The Clansmen honor Colin, and name him a MacLeod for giving his life for their cause. Once he regains life, as all Immortals do, Colin adopts the name, and keeps it for the rest of his life, as it was with the MacLeods that Colin learned the values that would one day assist him in overcoming his unyielding lust for vengeance.

== Production ==
In August 2004, it was announced that Imagi Animation Studios and Davis-Panzer Productions were developing an animated Highlander feature which would be animated by Madhouse. The script was written by David Abramowitz who had previously served as a head writer on Highlander: The Series. Producer Galen Walker said the project came about from the producers desire to take a western franchise and filter it through an anime style. As Yoshiaki Kawajiri was a fan of the Highlander franchise this led to him being hired to direct the film. The initial plan for the film was to have the film directly tie to Highlander: The Series including having the cast of that series serve as voice actors, but during the pre-production the producers ended up moving in a different direction and only Jim Byrnes was retained.

== Director's cut ==
Producer H. Galen Walker said in an interview: "There's about seven or eight additional scenes in the Japanese version that we cut out in the U.S.—one, just for timing, and just for pace of story. That was the big issue. I'm sure Mr. Kawajiri was really unhappy about the cut, but this was what the other producers thought was best for everybody." An opening exposition text-sequence, which is traditional for Highlander films, was also added for the American version. Walker said that Kawajiri's original cut "will probably be out later this year," in an interview conducted in June 2007. More than a year later, the director's cut was finally released in Japan on December 5, 2008, with the running time of 95 minutes (10 minutes longer than the U.S. version).

== Reception ==
Critical reaction to Highlander: The Search for Vengeance has been generally favorable, and more favorable in general than the live-action Highlander sequels. Chris Wyatt of IGN awarded the film a score of 8 out of 10, saying: "Highlander: The Search for Vengeance is the best thing to happen to Highlander fans since the original film. [It's] violent, dramatic, sexy, and actually smart. ... Combat sequences, including the obligatory sword fights, are nothing less than stellar."

Rob Lineberger of DVD Verdict gave The Search for Vengeance a score of 96 out of 100, saying: "Not only does Highlander: The Search for Vengeance live up to the glory days of the franchise, it exceeds them in many ways. ... Kawajiri's movie is crammed full of breathtaking compositions and sophisticated effects, [and] the character depictions are also impressive. ... Great animation, superb music, and engaging voice acting complement the story. Not only is it a must-see for Highlander fans, but for fans of edgy anime with a mature bent."

Todd Douglass of DVD Talk said: "The story stands up quite well and frankly it reinvigorates a franchise that has otherwise turned stagnant. ... As a lover of Highlander and anime, The Search for Vengeance was more or less what I wanted it to be. ... [The film] is worth a look if you're even slightly interested in it." Jason Cook of The Spinning Image said that "The Search for Vengeance is a thoroughly enjoyable animated feature coupling classy visual flourishes with a lean plot. ... Anime fans will want to seek this out due to its director's pedigree, but those unfamiliar with the genre are still advised to give this a go."

Giving the film a "B" rating, Jim Harper of Flipside Movie Emporium said: "[Kawajiri's] association with the project is probably the best thing to happen to the Highlander franchise in a long, long time. ... Highlander: The Search for Vengeance covers much the same territory as the 1986 original, but it does so unapologetically, and with a genuine passion, too. ... Harper added that "in terms of pure entertainment, it's a hell of a lot more satisfying than any of the other sequels."
