= Highlander (video game) =

1986 video game

- Spectrum cover art
- Developer: Canvas
- Publisher: Ocean Software
- Platforms: Commodore 64, Amstrad CPC, ZX Spectrum
- Release: November 1986
- Genre: Fighting
- Modes: Single player, multiplayer

Highlander is a 1986 fighting game developed by Canvas and published by Ocean Software for the ZX Spectrum, Commodore 64, and Amstrad CPC home computers. It is based on the 1986 film of the same name. Highlander was panned by reviewers.

== Gameplay ==
In-game screenshot

Highlander is an arcade fighting game in which the player controls one of two swordsmen. In the single-player mode, the player plays as Connor MacLeod and must fight three opponents in one-on-one combat: his mentor Ramírez, then Fizir (named Fasil in the film), before finally facing The Kerghan (named The Kurgan in the film). In each fight the objective is to reduce the opponent's health to zero, at which point he is beheaded and the player wins the fight. A two-player mode is also available.

== Reception ==
Reception

Review scores
Publication	Score
Crash	57% (Spectrum)
Sinclair User	2/5 (Spectrum)
Zzap!64	30% (C64)

Crash gave the Spectrum version an overall score of 57%, calling its gameplay "clunky" and "trite", graphics "chunky" and 'unimpressive', and all three reviewers described Highlander as "boring", with one reviewer summarizing the game as "totally boring and quite unplayable". In addition to Sinclair User's "golden turkey" award, Sinclair User gave the Spectrum version of Highlander an overall score of two out of five stars, calling all three levels "virtually identical", and expressed that its gameplay 'lacks finesse', summarizing Highlander's gameplay as 'slamming the joystick until you win'.

Crash's sister magazine Zzap!64 gave the Commodore 64 version an overall score of 30%, thoroughly criticizing it as "slow and boring" with "blocky" graphics and "unresponsive" controls, bluntly summarizing the game as a whole as a "film tie-in rip-off" with "nothing vaguely original or interesting".

The ZX Spectrum version of Highlander is featured in Stuart Ashen's (also known by his online presence as Ashens) 2015 book Terrible Old Games You've Probably Never Heard Of, noting that the graphics for the Spectrum release are the same as those used in the Amstrad CPC and Commodore 64 releases, which are designed for a lower screen resolution and in more colors than the Spectrum. Ashens expresses that "the Spectrum's monochrome rendering leaves them an incomprehensible mess". Ashens heavily criticises its gameplay and graphics, expressing that the combat "feels futile" and stating that "on starting the game, the first thing to hit you is how incredibly ugly the characters are ... Astoundingly, it plays even worse than it looks. None of the sword fighting moves seem to do much ... you can't really tell who is successfully hitting whom ... Playing Highlander is one of the least entertaining ways you could possibly spend your time". Ashens calls Highlander's controls "horribly unresponsive" and moving the player character "clumsy", saying the single tactic to winning Highlander is to "mash the fire button and hope". Ashens calls the game design "lazy" as well, stating that "despite there being three different opponents that you have to load separately, they all have identical moves. They just look different and [have more health]", furthermore stating that the game feels like it was rushed.
