= William N. Panzer =

American film producer

- Born: William Norton Panzer; September 6, 1942; New York City, United States
- Died: March 18, 2007 (aged 64); Boise, Idaho, United States
- Education: Princeton University, New York University Film School
- Occupations: Film and television producer

William Norton Panzer (September 6, 1942 – March 18, 2007) was an American television and film producer best known as one half of Davis-Panzer Productions, the production company behind the Highlander franchise.

== Early life and education ==
Panzer was born in New York City and educated at Princeton University. He then attended the New York University Film School, and worked as a cameraman and film editor, then produced television commercials at VPI. In 1968, still at New York University, he produced the feature documentary Mexican Anticipation starring Duke Ellington. Panzer then partnered Phos Cine Productions in New York, making commercials and industrial films for seven years.

== Career ==
In 1976, Panzer moved to Los Angeles and partnered with Peter Davis to found Davis-Panzer Productions. They produced more than twenty films, including The Osterman Weekend (1983, directed by Sam Peckinpah), The Death Collector with Joe Pesci, Stunts, and Freeway (1988).

This company also made the Highlander franchise, which comprises five movies, two television series, animated features and video games. Panzer co-wrote screenplays for three Highlander movies, was Executive Producer of Highlander: The Series, which were nominated three times for the Gemini Awards and once for a Saturn Award in 1998. Panzer regularly attended Highlander conventions, where he mingled with fans and was very popular. Panzer has also been a familiar figure at the Cannes Film Festival since 1982.

In 1987, the Davis-Panzer company received an agreement with upstart film distributor New Century/Vista Film Co., and the projected budget is at $70 million, and represents the departure of key points from prior Davis-Panzer distribution deals with major film studios, and Davis-Panzer would fully funding through home video sales and foreign pre-sales, representing the 80% interest between the two, and 20% equity investment, and New Century/Vista is preparing to forgo any hold on home video release as a condition for supplying prints and advertising as part of the distribution package. That year, in late November 1987, Vestron made a deal to handle five pictures in the Davis/Panzer Gower Street II package in five countries, and one of the upcoming features, King of the Wild, Vestron would receive international rights with no exclusions, and various companies is vying for different rights to the Highlander sequel in various countries, such as a joint of Vestron, Highlight Communications, Filmauro, Nea Kinisi and Lusomondo.

Panzer was a member of the British Academy of Film and Television Arts and of the Television Academy. His wife was Priscilla Panzer. There is a scholarship fund in his name at the Lawrenceville School in Princeton, New Jersey.

== Death and tributes ==
On March 18, 2007, Panzer, who owned a home in Ketchum, Idaho, fell while iceskating at the neighbouring resort of Sun Valley. After being transported by helicopter to St. Alphonsus Hospital in Boise, he died at 7:01 p.m, at the age of 64. The cause of death was confirmed to be a "blunt force trauma of the head due to a ground level fall", according from the Ada County Coroners' office. The anime film Highlander: The Search for Vengeance, and the television film Highlander: The Source, both of which he co-produced, are dedicated in memorial to him; the DVD bonus features for The Source has a memorial video based on Panzer's life and career.
