= Highlander: The Last of the MacLeods =

1995 video game

- Cover art by Steve Lang
- Developer: Lore Design Limited
- Publisher: Atari Corporation
- Director: Stephen Mitchell
- Producers: James Hampton; Ted Tahquechi
- Designers: Dave Bottomley; Jeffrey Gatrall; Stephen Wadsworth
- Programmers: Andrew Harris; Chris Lowe; Jakes Mo
- Artists: Dave Worton; Kev Connolly; Paul Johnson
- Writer: Serge Rosenzweig
- Composer: Paul Charisse
- Platform: Atari Jaguar CD
- Release: NA: 30 October 1995; EU: November 1995
- Genre: Action-adventure
- Mode: Single-player

Highlander: The Last of the MacLeods is a 1995 action-adventure video game developed by Lore Design and published by Atari Corporation exclusively for the Atari Jaguar CD. The first installment in a planned trilogy based on Gaumont Television and Bohbot Entertainment's Highlander: The Animated Series, which itself was a loose spin-off and sequel of the 1986 film of the same name, players assume the role of Quentin MacLeod in an effort to save the Dundee clan from slavers of the evil immortal Kortan. The gameplay mainly consists of action and exploration with a main eight-button configuration.

In 1993, Atari Corp. licensed the animated television series after coming with the idea of creating a game project in Gregory Widen's Highlander franchise, as members within the company were fans of the films and Alien vs Predator producer James Hampton led its development alongside Lore Design, who previously worked on several titles for the Atari Lynx such as Kung Food. Originally intended to be a fighting game, the project was instead retooled into an adventure trilogy spanning three discs due to its scope, which were going to be released as separate entries that would have connected each of their plots into one overarching narrative, with Highlander: The Last of the MacLeods being the first title launched from the planned trilogy.

Highlander: The Last of the MacLeods received mixed reception from critics and reviewers since its initial release on the Jaguar CD, who praised various aspects such as the presentation and graphics but others felt divided in regards to the sound design and controls, while some also drew comparison with Alone in the Dark and Resident Evil due to its similar play style. A PC port was in development by Lore Design and announced to be published under the Atari Interactive brand. However, it was never officially released. Ultimately, it remained as an exclusive for the add-on instead. Further, neither sequel in the planned trilogy were ever released to the public.

== Gameplay ==
Gameplay screenshot

Highlander: The Last of the MacLeods is a third-person action-adventure game presented with polygonal characters on a pre-rendered 3D post-apocalyptic environment that plays similarly to Alone in the Dark and Resident Evil, where players assume the role of Quentin MacLeod on a journey to save the Dundee clan from slavers of Kortan, an evil immortal who refused to swear the oath made by the Jettators that involved no longer killing any other immortal in order to guide humanity in rebuilding their society.

Through the game, players battle against enemies with collected items and weapons that will be useful when solving puzzles to progress further, but it is also possible to defeat most enemies with physical attacks. When being armed or unarmed, players can perform a variety of actions with the buttons on the controller and it also features support for the ProController. By either walking over an object or pressing Option during gameplay, an inventory screen is accessed to select any crucial item for use. If a Memory Track cartridge is present, the current progress can be manually saved; otherwise, players must play through the game without saving. Prior to starting, players have the choice to change the default language settings.

== Synopsis ==
The plot of Highlander: The Last of the MacLeods follows the first season of the animated television series, which takes place on a post-apocalyptic Earth in the 27th century after a meteorite collided against the planet and set off multiple nuclear weapons that nearly wiped out all of humanity, which became an event known for survivors as the "Great Catastrophe". Connor MacLeod and other Immortals forswear the Game of fighting each other until only one of their race remained to claim the Prize in order to guide humanity on rebuilding their society, casting away their swords and calling themselves "Jettators" but one of their kind, Kortan, outright refused to swear the oath and declared himself the last immortal to keep seeking the elusive Prize, now wishing to dominate the world. Connor challenges Kortan to a duel but he is defeated and eventually killed by the latter, as those who breaks the oath are forcefully destined to die. However, with his demise, a new prophecy surged that foretell the rise of a new immortal unbound by the oath and destined to kill Kortan who, uncontested by the Jettators and nigh-unkillable by mortal humans, managed to control most of the planet with his established empire that he rules from his fortress Mogonda.

700 years later, a teenager named Quentin lived peacefully alongside his family with the Dundee clan in the highlands until the military forces of Kortan arrived attacking their village on a slave raid. His mother is fatally wounded during the assault, who tells him that he is not her true son and revealing his lineage to be that from the clan MacLeod, before dying due to her injuries. Quentin tries defending his current clan from the slavers but he is killed during the attempt by one of the soldiers and presumed to be "dead". After his people were captured and the village was left completely decimated, Quentin makes a complete recovery from his apparently fatal stab and eventually meets with the Jettator Don Vincente Marino Ramirez, who becomes his mentor, teaches him about the Immortals, his mission to confront Kortan and trains him in combat, which leads Quentin in setting off on a journey to free his sister Cylde and the Dundee clan before his fated confrontation against the evil tyrant.

Quentin travels several locations and meets with other Jettators to gain their Quickening and knowledge through "sharing" by simultaneously grasping the same sword before eventually managing to reach an enemy stronghold where his people remains captured by Kortan's soldiers. After battling against them, he sets his people free; this ends the first part of the trilogy.

== Development ==
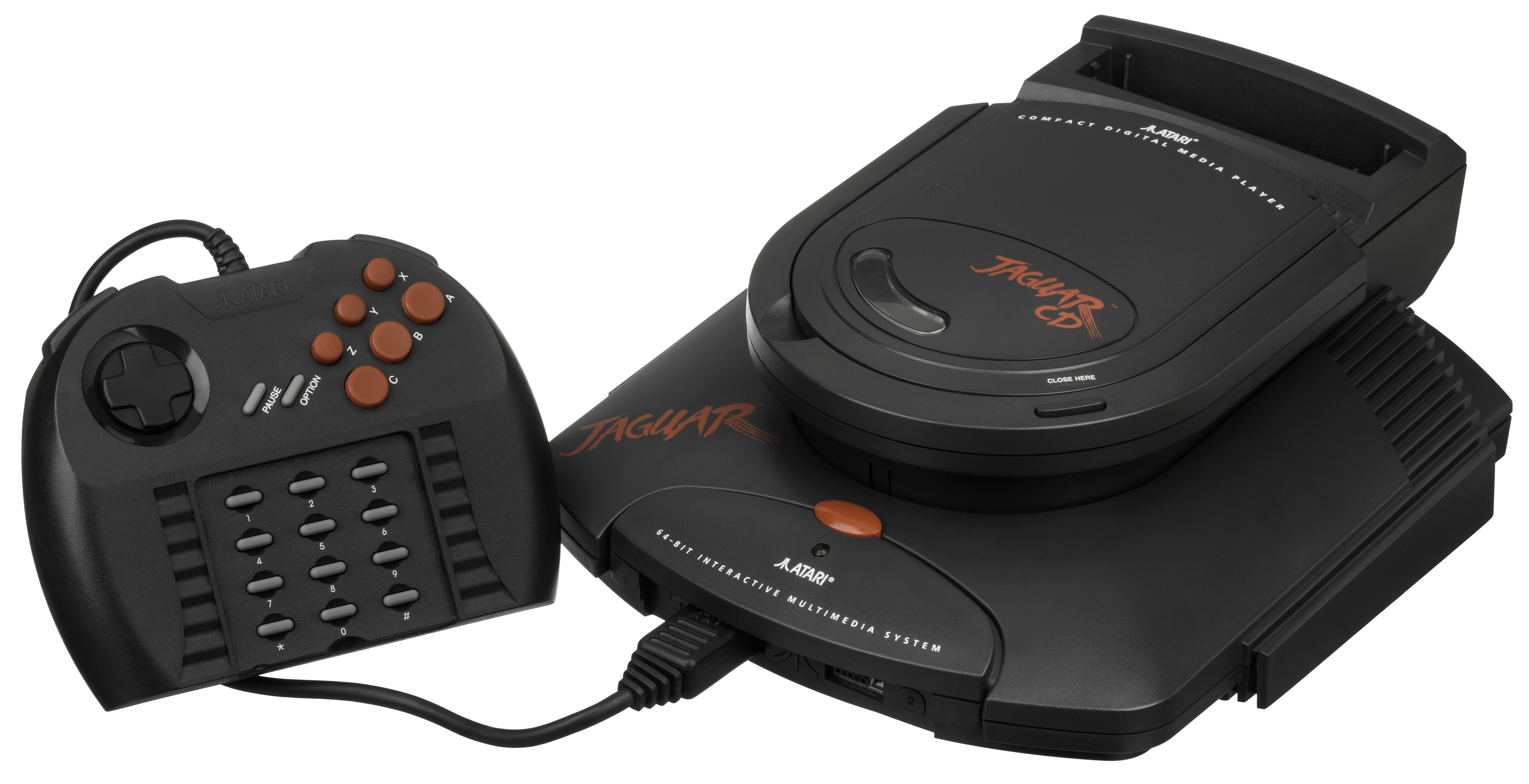
Initially envisioned to be a fighting game, Atari's take on Highlander would later be reworked into an adventure game trilogy instead, with Highlander: The Last of the MacLeods being the first part in a planned three-disc epic for Atari Jaguar CD.

According to Alien vs Predator producer James Hampton, plans for a video game adaptation of Highlander: The Animated Series were realized due to many of the members within Atari Corporation being fans of the Highlander films by Gregory Widen and wanted to develop a project based upon the franchise, with the company later securing the rights to the animated television series as early as December 1993. Lore Design Limited, a UK-based developer who created multiple titles for the Atari Lynx such as Kung Food, were starting to experiment with 3D modeling through their artist Dave Worton that would later prove to be essential before being contacted by Atari Corp. for the upcoming Highlander project in order to do so.

The project began development in May 1994 and was originally intended to be a fighting game akin to Rise of the Robots in terms of visual style but due to technical difficulties and the team being tired of fighting titles in general, the original concept was scrapped and the project was instead retooled into an adventure game similar to Alone in the Dark, with director Stephen "Steve" Mitchell later stating that the initial idea would have not represented the franchise's lore properly. It was also initially intended to be one title but according to Hampton, due to the growing scope of the project as well as a desire to integrate motion capture on the gameplay that would led them in funding a motion capture studio to be built at the headquarters of Lore Design, it was ultimately decided to make it a trilogy for the Jaguar CD add-on spanning three discs.

Highlander: The Last of the MacLeods was developed with 15 team members at Lore Design led by Mitchell alongside Hampton, who acted as both producer and designer of the project alongside Ted Tahquechi, although he is not credited as such in the credits of the game. Ellen Echelman of Bohbot Entertainment, as well as Gaumont Television, Nelvana and other production companies involved with the animated series, also collaborated and aided with the game's development, providing original production material such as scripts, concept art, storyboards and original sound effect recordings. The game also features video clips from the TV series to move the storyline along, with all of the original voice actors from the aforementioned series returning to reprise their respective roles.

All of the in-game artwork was pre-rendered with 3D Studio, based on the original designs by Gaumont and displayed using high color format, while the three-dimensional character models such as Quentin himself consist of 300 polygons. It also makes use of the various hardware features found within the Jaguar such as Z-buffering, which causes the animated characters to be composited correctly within the pre-rendered artwork.

The motion capture process for character animation was handled at Lore Design's then-recently built studio. This involved the filming of actors performing moves with retro-reflective markers attached on determined parts of their bodies, using an array of 6 cameras, each with a ring light source around the lens. Commercial software would convert the output of the cameras into a mostly-coherent set of 3d coordinates for each point, moving through time. Once an actor's movement was recorded as a point cloud, a Windows PC-based custom tool set was used to label the points, tidy up the data, and convert it into an animation format designed by Lore. The game engine, written by Lore, applied that animation to a character's 3d model, which moved the model in the scene, and moved the parts of the model. The model was then rendered and composited within the pre-background.

== Release ==
Highlander: The Last of the MacLeods was formally announced to the public during SCES '94 and WCES '95, becoming one of the first titles planned for the Jaguar CD. The game also made its appearance on the showfloor of events such as Spring ECTS '95, E3 1995, and Autumn ECTS '95. It was originally planned for a Q3 1995 release, before being now listed for an August 1995 release and later for a late release in the year. The project was completed and was first released in North America on 30 October 1995, and later in European regions on November of the same year.

A PC version of Highlander: The Last of the MacLeods was under development by Lore Design and planned to be published by Atari's then-recently formed Atari Interactive division but due to the closure of the newly formed PC publishing division as a result of the company merging with JT Storage in 1996, it was never officially released. In 2004, a beta build of the PC port was released by the defunct Jaguar Sector II website under a CD-ROM compilation titled Jaguar Extremist Pack #3, which also feature a beta build of the original Jaguar CD version.

== Reception ==
Reception

Review scores
Publication	Score
Next Generation	3/5
AllGame	2.5/5
Atari Gaming Headquarters	7/10
The Electric Playground	8.5/10
GamePro	7/20
MAN!AC	39%
Game Zero Magazine	14.5/25
ST-Computer	95%
ST Magazine	80%

A reviewer for Next Generation praised the game's full-motion video sequences and accessible exploration. He admitted that the game would not appeal to action fans due to the poor controls and "sluggish response time", but felt that for Jaguar CD owners with a liking for role-playing video games it was "as close to being a 'must have' as you can get" by simple virtue of being the only game in that vein for either the Jaguar CD or standalone Jaguar. He gave it three out of five stars.

Bonehead of GamePro instead judged it "one of the lowlights for Atari's new system". While he agreed that the full motion video sequences are good, he panned the game for its plodding pace, lack of sound effects, and particularly the poor combat: "Your character often turns the wrong way, smacking right into enemies, and his feeble punches and kicks look like a toddler's tiny tantrum. Highlander is high on frustration".

In 2023, Time Extension listed it as one of the best games for the Jaguar.

== Legacy ==
The Highlander trilogy would be the last set of games to be created by Lore Design Limited. An internal dispute with Atari with regards to their future titles resulted in insolvency and voluntary receivership of the company in 1997; this culminated with the closure of Lore Design Limited. Many of the former Lore Design members would go on to form Magenta Software. Stephen Mitchell would work for Sony Computer Entertainment Europe; he would later establish Diamond Apple. In 2009, the trademark renewal for the animated series, which the planned trilogy is based on, was cancelled. In August 2008, the source code of Highlander: The Last of the MacLeods was released by Jaguar Sector II under a CD compilation for PC titled Jaguar Source Code Collection.

=== Cancelled sequels ===
==== Highlander 2: The Quest for Knowledge ====
The second part in the planned trilogy, Highlander 2: The Quest for Knowledge, would have follow after the events occurred in the first part, where Ramirez falls into a coma after being poisoned and Quentin must search and meet with other Jettators in order to find an antidote. The game was announced along with the first part in 1995, with plans for a Q4 1995 release date, while its last mentioning happened by online magazine Atari Explorer Online in the last issue under their original name in January 1996 before being left unreleased. As with the first title, it was also planned for PC.

==== Highlander 3: The Time of Endings ====
The third and final part in the planned trilogy, Highlander 3: The Time of Endings, would have served as the definitive conclusion and take place after the events occurred in the second part, where Quentin has been betrayed by a rogue Jettator who plans in executing a genocide against the citizens of Mogonda, before finally confronting Kortan in a one-on-one duel and rescue his girlfriend Alia. Like the second part, the third game was announced along with the first part in 1995, with plans for a Q4 1995 release date, while its last mentioning happened by online magazine Atari Explorer Online on the last issue under their original name in January 1996 before being left unreleased as well. As with both the first and second game, the third title was also planned for PC.
