= Highlander: The Raven =

- Genre: Action/Adventure; Drama; Science fantasy
- Created by: Davis-Panzer Productions
- Based on: Characters by Gregory Widen
- Directed by: Dennis Berry
- Starring: Elizabeth Gracen; Paul Johansson; Patricia Gage
- Theme music composer: Axel Belohoubek
- Countries of origin: United States; Canada (Note: From Fireworks Entertainment)
- Original language: English
- No. of seasons: 1
- No. of episodes: 22

Production
- Executive producers: Christian Charret; Peter S. Davis; Marla Ginsburg; William N. Panzer
- Producers: Denis Leroy; Steve Wakefield
- Production locations: Toronto, Ontario; Paris, France
- Cinematography: John Berrie; Arthur Cloquet
- Running time: 45 minutes
- Production companies: Fireworks Entertainment; Rysher Entertainment; Gaumont Television; Atlantique Productions; Reteitalia

Original release
- Network: Syndication
- Release: September 26, 1998 – May 17, 1999

Related
- Highlander: The Series

Highlander: The Raven is a Canadian-American science fantasy action-adventure television series based on the Highlander franchise. It was a short-lived spin-off from the television series Highlander: The Series, continuing the saga of a female Immortal. The series followed the character of Amanda (played by Elizabeth Gracen), a character that originated as a recurring role in the earlier series. The Raven was filmed in Toronto, Ontario, Canada, and in Paris, France; it was produced by Gaumont Télévision and Fireworks Media in association with Davis–Panzer Productions.

== Premise ==
In the pilot, Immortal thief Amanda meets Nick Wolfe (Paul Johansson), a cop who is investigating a series of robberies. During the course of the investigation, Amanda is framed for murder by a crooked cop from Nick's department. Amanda's name is cleared, but not before Nick's partner Claudia Hoffman (Torri Higginson) sacrifices her own life to save Amanda's. Nick discovers Amanda's immortality when he sees Amanda die, then get up and run away.

Claudia's death has a profound effect on Amanda, and throughout the series (with help from Nick's own strong moral code), she attempts to change and become a good person. She discovers that she caused the deaths of a battalion of soldiers in World War I, which further influences this change. Amanda finds herself facing up to Immortals, even if she does not think she can beat them, when previously, she would have run away.

In the final episode, Nick inhales a deadly poison, and is told he has 24 hours to live. Amanda, trying to do the right thing, shoots him. When he awakens a few seconds later, he discovers that he too is Immortal. The reason behind shooting him was that his immortality could only be triggered by the shock of a violent death. To Amanda's dismay, Nick is none too happy about it. The series ends on a cliffhanger with Nick walking away, angry at Amanda for not telling him that he was Immortal (which she had known all along), and for making the decision for him.

=== Narration ===
Like the original series, there is an opening montage of scenes from various episodes of Highlander: The Raven, which narrates the series' theme. Nick Wolfe narrated the episodes:

She is immortal. A thousand years old, and she cannot die. A creature of legend, like the Raven. A thief who stole the sun and the moon. They sent a warrior to bring her back. He found her. Together, they brought back light to the world. I was a cop. To me, she was just a thief. Another day on the job. But she wasn't. She changed my life. Changed... everything. And both of us knew, from that moment on, nothing would ever be the same.

== Characters ==
- Amanda (played by Elizabeth Gracen) – A 1,200-year-old Immortal, a thief and Duncan MacLeod's lover on multiple occasions.
- Nick Wolfe (played by Paul Johansson) – An ex-cop who befriended Amanda and together solved crimes.

== Reception ==
Critical reaction to Highlander: The Raven has been mixed, more so than Highlander: The Series, which has received generally favorable reviews from critics. Rob Lineberger of DVD Verdict praised several episodes of the show ("War and Peace" in particular, for "recaptur[ing] the magic of classic Highlander through carefully staged flashbacks, compelling moral questions, Immortal ethics, and amazing stunt work") and said that "there is something singularly compelling about [the show], something that makes [the DVD set's] $40 street price worth considering," but said of the show overall: "The writing is below the common denominator, using clichés in the blandest ways, ... the chemistry between the two leads is rudimentary at best, with little to no character development, [and] the style of the show is somehow off, the music awkward, the direction formless."

David Nusair of Reel Film said: "[While] Gracen and Johansson are effective in their roles ... it's not terribly difficult to see why Highlander: The Raven never took off; the show essentially abandons the sort of elements that made the previous series and all the movies so successful, choosing instead to take a less conventional route. And while all these episodes are entertaining enough, fans hoping for another by-the-book Highlander spin-off will surely be disappointed." Peter Schorn of IGN criticized the series for its "weak writing, lame action, and utter lack of chemistry between the stars." Schorn said that while the second half of the show "beg[an] to find its footing" by having a "greater sense of atmosphere" and "balanc[ing] the cast to preserve some semblance of Highlander continuity," the first half "features generic cop show convention exploited to exhaustive effect while the characters undergo rote personality arcs and character development better suited for Moonlighting knock-offs."

Jeffrey Robinson of DVD Talk also felt that "the second half of the series is more interesting [than the first]," saying: "At first I did not find the show appealing at all. The problem was the show is not Highlander and it tried to move in too many different directions. For the most part it tended to be a cop show with immortals ... Once the series was about halfway through, my opinion began to change. I found the show was getting more entertaining as it started to fall back to the traditional format of Highlander. By the end of the last episode, I felt cheated there was not more because the finale ends with a cliffhanger that would have been a great lead into a second season." Robinson concluded: "I enjoyed watching Highlander: The Raven, but not enough to recommend it."

== Episodes ==
No.	Title	Directed by	Written by	Original release date	Prod. code
1	"Reborn"	Ian Toynton	Karen Harris	September 21, 1998	98101-201
Immortal thief Amanda is followed by detectives Nick Wolfe and Claudia Hoffmann (Torri Higginson). Meanwhile, rogue detective Stanley Ferris (James Purcell) kills her fence, Immortal Basil Morgan (Julian Richings), and frames her. When Morgan fetches Amanda at the police station, he recognizes Ferris as his murderer. Ferris tries to kill Wolfe, who is saved by Amanda. Ferris then goes for Amanda, but Hoffmann dies in her place. Ferris shoots Amanda and is killed by Wolfe. Wolfe witnesses Amanda resurrecting.
2	"Full Disclosure"	Peter Ellis	James Thorpe	September 28, 1998	98102-202
Wolfe and Amanda cannot prevent Navajo code talker Walter (James Kidnie) from being killed by Immortal Mario Cardoza (Carlo Rota). Amanda helped Cardoza in 1952 and Walter found evidence of them being still alive. Wolfe works this out. Amanda admits her Immortality to him. Cardoza kills himself by paying a hitman in order to disappear. The plan works, but Amanda finally beheads Cardoza.
3	"Bloodlines"	Dennis Berry	James Thorpe	October 5, 1998	98103-203
Wolfe kills Morgan Kenworthy (Cedric Smith), an assassin whose target was media proprietor Denise Grady (Carolyn Dunn). Wolfe realizes Kenworthy is Immortal. Amanda recalls how Denise Grady's ancestor killed Kenworthy's son in 1897 and realizes Kenworthy kills the best of the Gradys of every generation. Despite Amanda's warnings, Wolfe fights Kenworthy, who is beheaded by a falling shard of glass.
4	"Immunity"	Dennis Berry	Karen Harris	October 12, 1998	98104-204
Myers asks Wolfe to retrieve top secret plans at the Romanian embassy. Amanda agrees to help to escape Immortal Stefan Collier (James Kee). Amanda and Wolfe's attempted robbery is foiled by both Collier and enemy agent Marta Antonescu (Tara Rosling), who takes the plans and flees to the nearest airport. Amanda and Wolfe follow and stop Antonescu. Amanda finally fights Collier and beheads him.
5	"So Shall Ye Reap"	René Bonnière	Michael O'Mahoney, Sacha Reins	October 19, 1998	98105-205
FBI agents Martin Foster (Chuck Shamata) and Hewlitt (Frank Pellegrino) kill a scientist. His father, Charlie (Lawrence Dane), asks Amanda and Wolfe for help. After they find genetically modified seeds in another dead scientist's house, they are arrested by the FBI. Foster bails them out to get the seeds, but they reveal the story to the press. Foster walks free after his trial and is killed by Charlie, who is killed by Hewlitt.
6	"Birthright"	George Mendeluk	Frank Encarnacao	October 26, 1998	98106-206
Simon Clark (Philip Akin) and Riley Del Deegan (John Ralston) steal the jewels of the Maria Rose wreckage. Amanda had helped two freed slaves to get on board the Maria Rose in 1720. Clark, descendant of the freed slaves, wants the deed that freed his ancestors and kills Del Deegan who refuses to retrieve it. A dying Clark asks Amanda for help, and Amanda and Wolfe steal the deed for his children.
7	"Crime and Punishment"	René Bonnière	Tibby Rothman	November 2, 1998	98107-207
Convicted murderer Ray Bonita (Mark Humphrey) tries to kill Wolfe, who arrested him. Wolfe discovers that Bonita was innocent and that Bonita's old friend Darryl Keenan (Andrew Jackson) framed Bonita for the crime. Bonita distrusts Wolfe and seeks help by Keenan. Wolfe cannot prevent Keenan from killing Bonita. Amanda blackmails Keenan to get him arrested.
8	"The Unknown Soldier"	George Mendeluk	James Thorpe	November 9, 1998	98108-208
Amanda meets Immortal John Ray Fielding (Michael Rhoades) in a graveyard and remembers how she stole a pouch of jewels from him in 1917. Fielding wants Amanda's head because inside the pouch was a withdrawal order that never arrived. This caused the death of 120 soldiers. When Amanda realizes this, she offers her head to Fielding, but following persuasion from Wolfe, Fielding lets her live.
9	"Cloak and Dagger"	Rene Manzor	Frank Encarnacao	November 16, 1998	98109-209
Myers asks Amanda to break into Ludwig Weiss' (Marc Strange) house with him to retrieve a secret file. Myers is forced to kill Weiss. Myers admits to Amanda and Wolfe that he met Weiss while working undercover in the Stasi. Weiss blackmailed Myers to have Myers kill a diplomat Myers is protecting. When the diplomat arrives in town, Myers, Amanda and Wolfe prevent Weiss' men from killing her.
10	"Passion Play"	Dennis Berry	Morrie Ruvinsky	November 23, 1998	98110-210
In 1963, Lucy was a successful young actor married to Immortal Marco Becker (Kirby Morrow). Immortal Wilson Geary (Gordon Currie) used Lucy to behead Becker. Lucy has hated Geary ever since and refuses to hear Amanda and Wolfe's advice to grow beyond it. Geary kidnaps Lucy to get Amanda's head. Wolfe frees Lucy while Amanda fights and beheads Geary.
11	"The Devil You Know"	Donald Paonessa	Durnford King	November 30, 1998	98111-211
Immortal Victor Hansen (Geordie Johnson) asks Amanda to help him steal the Valentino Diamond. Hansen kills security chief Bob Marshall (Richard Fitzpatrick) to get the security plans. Wolfe investigates the murder and suspects Hansen, then is nearly killed when his car explodes. During the robbery, Amanda learns what Hansen did to Wolfe and fights Hansen. Wolfe interrupts them and Hansen flees after being shot into the river.
12	"A Matter of Time"	Dennis Berry	Karen Harris	February 1, 1999	98112-212
Wolfe meets Joe Dawson and learns about the Watchers. Dawson tells Amanda that her former mentor Andre Korda (Valentine Pelka) is after her. Amanda meets Korda and refuses to join him. Korda goes to Paris and leaves Immortal Chrysta (Ellen Dubin) to fight Amanda. Amanda wins but she and Dawson make Wolfe believe she is dead. A vengeful Wolfe goes to Paris and finds Korda, who shoots him.
13	"The French Connection"	Dennis Berry	James Thorpe	February 8, 1999	98113-213
A dying Wolfe is rescued by Myers. After a long search, Amanda finds Wolfe. Using Myers hi-tech equipment, Wolfe figures out Korda's plan: counterfeiting money. Amanda and Wolfe follow Korda in the catacombs of Paris and barely escape Korda. Korda's henchman kidnap Myers, who is rescued by Wolfe. Amanda fights Korda and beheads him. Amanda and Wolfe decide to settle in Paris.
14	"The Rogue"	George Mendeluk	Frank Encarnacao	February 15, 1999	98114-214
Immortal Frank Brennan (Michael Siberry) tries to kill actress Debra Dow (Lysette Anthony), Myers' current employer. Wolfe remembers having killed Brennan four years ago to protect Myers. When Brennan kills Rachael (Glynis Barber), one of the bodyguards working for Myers, Wolfe and Amanda realize Brennan is after Myers. Wolfe and Amanda protect Myers and Amanda finally beheads Brennan.
15	"Inferno"	Dennis Berry	Elizabeth Baxter	February 22, 1999	98115-215
Immortal Talia Bauer (Michelle Gomez) steals a briefcase. Its owner, Michael Garrett (Jolyon Baker), asks Wolfe to retrieve it. Amanda remembers how Bauer saved her head from the guillotine in 1792. Wolfe and Amanda search Bauer's flat. Amanda cracks Bauer's safe open and discovers the deadly virus the case contained. Wolfe defuses a bomb designed to disseminate the virus and Amanda beheads Bauer after a fight.
16	"The Frame"	George Mendeluk	Tibby Rothman	April 5, 1999	98116-216
Immortal Jade (Charlotte Lewis) steals a priceless painting. Jade has been Amanda's rival in love and thieving for centuries. Wolfe and Amanda find Jade and bring the painting back to its owner, Sir Trevor Benton (Ronan Vibert). Sir Trevor had set up the robbery to get the insurance money. Amanda, Wolfe and Jade bring the painting and Sir Trevor back to the museum and leave him there to be arrested.
17	"Love and Death"	Gerard Hameline	Jocelyne Barque Simmons	April 12, 1999	98117-217
Myers finds an old photograph of Amanda at the house of kidnapper and Immortal Derrick Markham (Stephen Billington). When Amanda sees the picture, she remembers how Markham killed the boy they had kidnapped in 1867. Markham is after Myers. When Myers witnesses Markham resurrecting, Amanda tells Myers she and Markham are Immortals but Myers does not believe her. Amanda fights and beheads Markham.
18	"Thick as Thieves"	George Mendeluk	James Thorpe	April 19, 1999	98118-218
Immortal Jeremy Dexter (Stephen Moyer) robs a casino. Amanda had stolen Queen Mary's treasury with Dexter in 1554 and refuses to help Wolfe and Interpol agent Nicolae Breslaw (Jan Triska) chase Dexter. Triska holds an old grudge against Dexter. Amanda vainly tries to help Dexter disappear with Wolfe and Triska in close pursuit. Triska is unable to kill Dexter, so Wolfe does it to end Triska's investigation.
19	"The Manipulator"	Brian Grant	Andre Jacquemetton	April 26, 1999	98119-219
Journalist Tim Helfet (Guy Lankester) asks Wolfe and Amanda to retrieve a laptop from Vladimir Rankov (Miles Richardson). Wolfe and Amanda withdraw when they discover Rankov is Immortal. Amanda remembers how Rankov, a war profiteer, had killed her protegee in 1565. Wolfe and Amanda finally retrieve the laptop but Helfet is captured by Rankov. While Wolfe frees Helfet, Amanda fights and beheads Rankov.
20	"The Ex-Files"	George Mendeluk	Karen Harris	May 3, 1999	98120-220
Wolfe's ex-wife Lauren (Rochelle Redfield) is after Immortal Julius Heller (Julian Wadham), a corrupt scientist, and asks Wolfe for help. Amanda remembers how Heller burnt a midwife at the stake like a witch in 1643. Heller kills Lauren. Amanda fights Heller, but they are interrupted by Wolfe before Heller can behead Amanda. Wolfe chases Heller and finally beheads him.
21	"War and Peace"	Brian Grant	Catherine Porcioncula	May 10, 1999	98121-221
Amanda fights Immortal Sean (Benedick Bates) when they are interrupted. Liam remembers how he fought on the British side in the American Revolutionary War, while Sean was on the American side. Liam killed Sean in battle. Liam vowed to become a priest if Sean's stepmother survived her injuries. She died, but Amanda lied to Liam about it. In the present, Liam offers his head to Sean, who relents.
22	"Dead on Arrival"	George Mendeluk	James Thorpe	May 17, 1999	98122-222
Immortal Evan Peyton (Thomas Lockyer) kills a hacker. When Wolfe and Amanda investigate the case, Peyton visits Amanda. Amanda remembers how Peyton had poisoned a friend of hers in 1610. Wolfe listens to Peyton and Amanda and follows Peyton. Peyton poisons Wolfe. Wolfe becomes increasingly sick but helps Amanda behead Peyton. Amanda shoots Wolfe to trigger his Immortality. Wolfe angrily tells her he cannot love someone whom he will eventually have to behead and walks away.

== Home media ==
Anchor Bay Entertainment has released the complete series on DVD in Region 1.

DVD name	Ep #	Release date	Additional information
The Complete Series	22	June 14, 2005	Brand new behind-the-scenes audio and video commentary from cast and crew, including Gracen and Johansson; Cast Bios; Trivia; Featurettes; Raven Chronicles; Blooper Reel
