= Juan Sánchez-Villalobos Ramírez =

Fictional from the Highlander franchise

- Highlander character
- First appearance: Highlander
- Portrayed by: Sean Connery (original series); Russell Crowe (reboot)

In-universe information
- Born: 898 BC, Egypt (Highlander)
- Teacher: Nakano; Graham Ashe

Juan Sánchez-Villalobos Ramírez is a fictional character in the Highlander franchise, which covers multiple timelines. Born under the name Tak-Ne and referred to as "the Spaniard", he is generally depicted as an Egyptian swordsman who is immortal, unable to die unless beheaded, due to an energy called the Quickening. Ramírez is notable for being the mentor and friend of Connor MacLeod, the main protagonist of the first three Highlander films. The film Highlander II: The Quickening gave the character an alternative origin as a sorcerer from the planet Zeist who becomes immortal when exiled to Earth, while the director's cut of the same film said he was still an immortal native to Earth but one born during a lost age of advanced technology that existed before recorded history.

Ramírez was portrayed by Sean Connery in Highlander and Highlander II: The Quickening. He is mentioned but never seen in the live-action show Highlander: The Series. Other than James Bond, Ramírez is the only character that Connery played in more than one film.

== Conception ==
In the original Widen script, Ramirez was known as Juan Cid Romirez and was an alchemist and chief surveyor. His origins were unknown but the script hinted that he was a Spanish born Immortal. He carried a large broadsword instead of the Dragonshead Katana.

Gene Hackman, Michael Caine and Peter O'Toole were considered for the role. Connery filmed his role in one week as he had other projects pending. The opening voice-over by Connery has an echo effect because it was recorded in the bathroom of his Spanish villa, where he had been working on his Spanish accent for the film with a voice coach. It was played for the producers over the phone, and they approved of it because they could not discern the quality of the recording.

== Fictional history ==
Ramírez's history is largely established by the 1986 film Highlander and its original screenplay, which adds details that did not make it into the final cut of the film but are treated as canon by later tie-in media. Some details are later added by Highlander: The Series and Highlander III: The Sorcerer.

The man who will be called Ramírez is born in Ancient Egypt in 896 BC (during the Third Intermediate Period, Twenty-second Dynasty) and named Tak-Ne. He lives an average life until he is run down by an out of control cart in the streets of his home. After he revives from his fatal wounds and shows no sign of his injuries, Tak-Ne is banished by the fearful people of his home and wanders the Earth. Tak-Ne originally believes that it is due to repeated quickening lightenings to the scrotum that Immortals can't have kids. It is explained to him later that, it's because they are aliens from another planet that is the reason.

Tak-Ne learns he and other rare people were born with an energy called the Quickening that makes them invincible to age, disease, and injury after their First Death, connects them to nature, lets them sense each other, and prevents them from having children. They can only die if beheaded, and immortals can absorb more Quickening energy by killing another of their own kind. For this reason, some hunt each other in "the Game", where the main rule is to never fight on holy ground. Tak-Ne is told that one day when just a few are left, those immortals will be drawn to a faraway land and fight in the Gathering, the final battle for the Prize: enough power to enslave humanity. According to the Game, "In the end, there can be only one." Determined that a corrupt person must not win the Prize, Tak-Ne battles and kills several evil immortals throughout history. One enemy he is never able to defeat is the murderous immortal known as the Kurgan (Clancy Brown). He and Tak-Ne battle each other in Babylonia, Greece, and ancient China. They encounter each other during the Battle of Plataea, when Tak-Ne fights alongside the Spartans. During this fight, Tak-Ne shatters the Kurgan's sword.

Tak-Ne marries three different times during his life. In Japan, less than six centuries before the beginning of the Common Era, he marries Shakiko, a Japanese princess. Shakiko's father, a great swordsmith named Masamune, gives Ramírez a katana in 592 BC. The sword is unique for the time, forged with a technique that Japan will not see again until the Middle Ages. After Shakiko dies, Tak-Ne is emotionally shattered and decides he will not form such connections with mortals again. He likewise advises other immortals against forming romantic connections with mortals.

By the 16th century, Tak-Ne lives in Spain under the name Juan Sánchez-Villalobos Ramírez and spends time working as the Chief Metallurgist to King Charles V. Ramírez leaves for the Scottish Highlands when he learns the Kurgan is there. After he arrives, he discovers the Kurgan targeted Connor MacLeod, a young Highlander who was banished from his clan after he inexplicably recovered from death in the battlefield. Ramírez tracks down MacLeod and the man's wife Heather, explaining the secrets of immortality and the Game. Wishing to make sure MacLeod can defend himself and hoping he will be an ally against evil such as the Kurgan, Ramírez trains the Highlander for over a year.

In 1542, while Connor is away hunting, the Kurgan finds Ramírez and Heather. A duel ensues and Ramírez nearly decapitates his foe. Though he fails, the Kurgan will carry the scar from the wound and a damaged voice for the rest of his immortal life. The Kurgan then kills Ramírez, bringing an end to their centuries-long conflict, and leaves. Connor buries Ramírez in Glencoe, near the home he shares with Heather. Decades later, Heather dies of old age. Connor leaves Scotland to wander the Earth, now adopting Ramírez's sword as his own. In 1985, the Gathering takes place and the last two immortals are Connor and the Kurgan. The Highlander wins, earning the Prize and finally avenging Ramírez's death centuries before.

=== Expanded history ===
The 1994 film Highlander III: The Sorcerer, also called Highlander: The Final Dimension, states that during his time in Japan, Ramírez learns how to use his new katana from the immortal sorcerer named Nakano (portrayed by Mako Iwamatsu).

The TV spin-off Highlander: The Series presents an alternative timeline where many more immortals exist on Earth. As a result, the events of the first film still occur in this timeline but Connor's victory over the Kurgan in 1985 is not the final battle and the Prize has yet to be won. The series (which follows the adventures of Duncan MacLeod (Adrian Paul), another immortal from the Clan MacLeod born decades after Connor's banishment) makes no reference to Highlander III: The Sorcerer but does not contradict it.

During the fifth season, Ramírez is mentioned in two different episodes and more of his history is revealed. According to Highlander: The Series, soon after being banished from his home in Egypt, Tak-Ne meets and is mentored by Tjanefer, an immortal born in Troy in the 12th century BC who later adopts the name Graham Ashe. Another episode says that during his time in Spain, Ramírez trains Otavio Consone, a Spanish noble who discovers he is immortal in 1481.

=== Alternative history ===
The film Highlander II: The Quickening contradicts several parts of the original film, introducing an alien-based origin story for all the immortals and a new history for Ramírez. It is now said that Ramírez and Connor MacLeod were originally mortal men born on the planet Zeist, around the time of Earth's 16th century. They live as revolutionaries against the world's corrupt leadership and General Katana. Ramírez is depicted as a sorcerer and the Quickening is now said to be a "kind of" magic he uses to create a bond between him and MacLeod that not even death can break. Captured by Katana's forces, Ramírez, MacLeod and the other prisoners are exiled to Earth, somehow becoming immortal in the process. They are told that their unending exile will end after they battle each other and only one remains. The final survivor will become mortal and can choose to remain on Earth to live out their days or return to Zeist with amnesty.

The film then takes place in 2024 where Connor MacLeod is now mortal since becoming the final winner. Not willing to risk he may ever return to Zeist, Katana sends assassins who become immortal as they arrive on Earth. MacLeod kills them, regaining his immortality and youth in the process. Using the magic of the Quickening, MacLeod resurrects Ramírez. The two fight alongside each other again, then Ramírez sacrifices his life to allow MacLeod a chance to escape a death trap.

In 2000, a director's cut was released called Highlander II: Renegade Version. In this cut, all references to Zeist are removed. Earth's immortals are now said not to be aliens but immortals who were born in an ancient civilization lost before recorded history. Ramírez and MacLeod were still depicted as revolutionaries against Katana, said to be another immortal, and they are still seen forging a bond through magic (though the magic is no longer referred to as the Quickening). When they are captured by Katana, the trial scene has replacement dialogue to explain that the immortal criminals will be exiled into the far future. As before, they will be forced to fight each other for the chance to either become mortal or return to their rightful home in the distant past, their crimes pardoned.

The film Highlander III: The Sorcerer (1994), also called Highlander: The Final Dimension, acts as an alternative sequel to the original film and removes Highlander II from its continuity. Similarly, Highlander II cannot exist in the same continuity as Highlander: The Series.

== Comic books ==
Dynamite Entertainment published a comic book mini-series acting as a prequel to the original Highlander film. The mini-series, entitled Highlander: The Way of the Sword, reveals that the sword Masamune gave to Ramírez was originally meant for his adopted son Ren. Ren later learns he too is immortal and carries a grudge against Ramírez for the next 2,500 years. Ren also trains with the immortal sorcerer Nakano and learns the art of metallurgy.

== Animated series continuity ==
Highlander: The Animated Series (1994-1996) takes place in an alternative timeline from the films in the 27th century. A character named Don Vincente Marino Ramírez (Benedict Campbell) is an ally of Connor's in the 20th century. He is different than the character Sean Connery portrayed in the film but shares a similar appearance.

After a meteorite devastates much of the planet and leads to the downfall of society, this version of Ramírez joins other immortals in taking a vow of non-violence, deciding to help and guide humanity rather than continue the Game. An immortal named Kortan refuses to take this vow and rules much of Earth in the 27th century. His rule is defied by young immortal Quentin MacLeod, last of the Clan MacLeod. Don Vincente Marino Ramírez acts as Quentin's mentor.

== In other media ==
- Robot Chicken features a parody of Highlander, which is also mentioned at the beginning of the skit with Ramírez saying, "As you may have noticed, this is a Highlander parody". In place of Connor, he is training Lindsay Lohan and in place of the Kurgan is Hilary Duff. He is voiced by Fred Tatasciore.
- The Marvelous Misadventures of Flapjack episode "Highlandlubber", features a parody of Ramírez partially based on Ponce de León who is an escaped insane asylum inmate who thinks Captain K'nuckles is a fellow Immortal and has him join his mad adventures, the episode concluding with him jumping into a volcano.
- In the book Ready Player One, the protagonist Parzival delays revealing his name to another character by jokingly introducing himself as Ramírez.
- In Paradox Development Studio's newest expansion for the computer game Crusader Kings II, the player can encounter a character named Ramírez, a 1500 year old Spanish-Scotsman who attempts to end player's life in personal combat via swordfight.
