= List of multimedia franchises originating in films =

Following is a list of multimedia franchises originating in films, whether animated or live-action.

In the following tables, the initial media through which the franchise characters or settings became known is shown in boldface. Only works of fiction are only considered part of the series; a book or a documentary film about the franchise is not itself an installment in the franchise.

== Franchises originating in animated films ==
Franchise (Creator)	Literature	Comics	Animated films	Live action films	Animated TV	Live action TV	Video games	Other media
An American Tail (Don Bluth, Gary Goldman, Steven Spielberg)	various	no	**An American Tail** (1986); An American Tail: Fievel Goes West (1991); An American Tail: The Treasure of Manhattan Island (1998); An American Tail: The Mystery of the Night Monster (1999)	no	Fievel's American Tails (1992)	no	various	An American Tail Theatre, toys, albums and more
The Bad Guys (Etan Cohen)	novelizations	no	The Bad Guys (2022); The Bad Guys 2 (2025) "The Bad Guys 3" (TBA) four shorts and specials	no	The Bad Guys: Breaking In (2025)	no	guest appearances in DreamWorks All-Star Kart Racing (2023)	The Bad Guys (Original Motion Picture Soundtrack) (2022); The Bad Guys 2 (Original Motion Picture Soundtrack) (2025)
Cars (John Lasseter and various)	various	various	**Cars** (2006); Cars 2 (2011); Cars 3 (2017); Planes (2013); Planes: Fire & Rescue (2014)	no	Cars Toons/Cars On The Road	no	various	toy line Cars Land
Casper the Friendly Ghost (Seymour Reit and Joe Oriolo)	no	Harvey Comics series (1949–) various others	**The Friendly Ghost** (short; 1945); Casper's Haunted Christmas (2000); Casper's Scare School (2006)	Casper (1995); Casper: A Spirited Beginning (1997); Casper Meets Wendy (1998)	Matty's Funday Funnies (1959–1961); The New Casper Cartoon Show (1963–1970); The Spooktacular New Adventures of Casper (1996); Casper's Scare School (2009)	no	various	toys
Despicable Me (Sergio Pablos)	children's novels	Minions comic albums	**Despicable Me** (2010); Despicable Me 2 (2013); Minions (2015); Despicable Me 3 (2017); Minions: The Rise of Gru (2022); Despicable Me 4 (2024); Minions & Monsters (2026)	no	Minions Holiday Special (2020)	no	Despicable Me; Minion Mayhem; Minion Rush; Minion Paradise	Despicable Me Minion Mayhem
Felix the Cat (Pat Sullivan and Otto Messmer)	Felix the Cat comic strip	various	**Theatrical Shorts series** (beginning in 1919 to 1930) sound and color revival shorts from Van Beuren Studios (1936); Felix the Cat: The Movie (1988); Felix the Cat Saves Christmas (2004)	no	Felix the Cat (1958–1960); The Twisted Tales of Felix the Cat (1995–1997); Baby Felix (2000–2001)	no	Felix the Cat (1992/1993); Felix the Cat's Cartoon Toolbox (1994)	various merchandise
Finding Nemo (Andrew Stanton)	yes	yes	**Finding Nemo** (2003); Finding Dory (2016)	Exploring the Reef with Jean-Michel Cousteau (2003)	no	no	yes	Finding Nemo the Musical; Finding Nemo Submarine Voyage
Ice Age (Michael J. Wilson)	no	no	**Ice Age** (2002); The Meltdown (2006); Dawn of the Dinosaurs (2009); Continental Drift (2012); Collision Course (2016); The Ice Age Adventures of Buck Wild (2022); Ice Age: Boiling Point (2027)	no	Ice Age: Scrat Tales (2022)	no	various	Ice Age Live! A Mammoth Adventure (live arena ice show)
The Incredibles (Brad Bird)	yes	yes	**The Incredibles** (2004); Incredibles 2 (2018); Incredibles 3 (2028)	no	no	no	various	Incredicoaster
Inside Out (Pete Docter, Ronnie del Carmen)	no	no	**Inside Out** (2015); Inside Out 2 (2024)	no	Dream Productions (2024)	no	several	no
Kung Fu Panda (Ethan Reiff and Cyrus Voris)	no	yes	**Kung Fu Panda** (2008); Kung Fu Panda 2 (2011); Kung Fu Panda 3 (2016); Kung Fu Panda 4 (2024)	no	Kung Fu Panda: Legends of Awesomeness (2011–2016); Kung Fu Panda: The Paws of Destiny (2018–2019); Kung Fu Panda: The Dragon Knight (2022-)	no	yes	numerous
The Land Before Time (Don Bluth, Gary Goldman, Judy Freudburg & Tony Geiss)	various	no	**The Land Before Time** (1988) sequels	no	The Land Before Time (2007–08)	no	List of The Land Before Time video games	no
Lilo & Stitch / Disney Stitch (Chris Sanders and Dean DeBlois)	children's novels, including the Agent Stitch series (beginning in 2022)	Comic Zone: Lilo & Stitch (2002–c. 2006); Stitch! manga books Stitch & the Samurai (2020); Lilo & Stitch (Dynamite Entertainment; 2024–present)	**Lilo & Stitch** (2002); Stitch! The Movie (2003); Lilo & Stitch 2: Stitch Has a Glitch (2005); Leroy & Stitch (2006)	Lilo & Stitch (2025)	Lilo & Stitch: The Series (2003–2006); Stitch! (2008–2015); Stitch & Ai (2017)	no	Disney's Lilo & Stitch (GBA; 2002); Lilo & Stitch: Trouble in Paradise (2002); Disney's Stitch: Experiment 626 (2002) various others	theme park attractions and additional merchandise
The Lion King (Roger Allers & Rob Minkoff)	adaption	various	**The Lion King** (1994); The Lion King II: Simba's Pride (1998); The Lion King 1½ (2004); The Lion King (2019); Mufasa: The Lion King (2024)	no (though the 2019 remake was advertised as a live-action film)	The Lion King's Timon & Pumbaa (1995–1999); The Lion Guard (2015–2019)	no	various	other media
Looney Tunes (Rudolf Ising and Hugh Harman)	yes	various	**Theatrical Looney Tunes and Merrie Melodies short films** (beginning in 1930 to 1969 with rival shorts released in the 1990s and 2010s) various feature films The Day the Earth Blew Up: A Looney Tunes Movie (2025)	Who Framed Roger Rabbit (1989)(cameo only); Space Jam (1996); Looney Tunes: Back in Action (2003); Space Jam: A New Legacy (2021); Coyote vs. Acme (2026)	numerous	no	List of Looney Tunes video games	Music albums, theme park attractions
Madagascar (Tom McGrath, Eric Darnell)	various	various	**Madagascar** (2005); Madagascar: Escape 2 Africa (2008); Madagascar 3: Europe's Most Wanted (2012); Penguins of Madagascar (2014); Untitled fourth Madagascar film (TBA)	no	various	no	various	musical, theme park attractions
Megamind (Alan Schoolcraft, Brent Simons)	no	DreamWorks' Megamind: Bad. Blue. Brilliant (2010-2011)	**Megamind** (2010); Megamind: The Button of Doom (2011); Megamind vs. the Doom Syndicate (2024)	no	Megamind Rules! (2024)	no	Megamind: Ultimate Showdown; Megamind: Mega Team Unite; Megamind: The Blue Defender (all 2010)	soundtrack
Mickey Mouse and Friends (Walt Disney and Ub Iwerks)	children's books	Mickey Mouse (comic book) various	**Theatrical short films** (beginning in 1928); Fantasia (1940); Saludos Amigos (1942); The Three Caballeros (1944); Fantasia 2000 (1999)	Who Framed Roger Rabbit (1989) (cameo only)	numerous	Walt Disney anthology television series	various	numerous
Monsters, Inc. (Pete Docter and various)	various	Monsters, Inc.: Laugh Factory	**Monsters, Inc.** (2001); Monsters University (2013)	no	Monsters at Work (2021–present)	no	various	numerous
The Secret Life of Pets (Cinco Paul; Brian Lynch; Ken Daurio)	yes	yes	**The Secret Life of Pets** (2016); The Secret Life of Pets 2 (2019)	no	no	no	The Secret Life of Pets: Unleashed	The Secret Life of Pets: Off the Leash!
Tom and Jerry (William Hanna & Joseph Barbera)	yes	various	**Theatrical short films**, (beginning in 1940 to 1967 and 2005); Tom and Jerry: The Movie (1992) various DTV animated films	Tom & Jerry (2021)	numerous	no	List of Tom and Jerry video games	Musical adaption
Toy Story (John Lasseter, and various)	yes	various	**Toy Story** (1995); Toy Story 2 (1999); Buzz Lightyear of Star Command: The Adventure Begins (2000); Toy Story 3 (2010); Toy Story Toons (2011–2012); Toy Story 4 (2019); Lamp Life (2020); Lightyear (2022); Toy Story 5 (2026)	no	Toy Story Treats (1996); Buzz Lightyear of Star Command (2000–2001); Forky Asks a Question (2019–2020) two TV shorts	no	various	other media
Wallace & Gromit/Shaun the Sheep (Nick Park)	yes	various	**A Grand Day Out** (1989); The Wrong Trousers (1993); A Close Shave (1995); The Curse of the Were-Rabbit (2005); A Matter of Loaf and Death(2008); Shaun the Sheep Movie (2015); A Shaun the Sheep Movie: Farmageddon (2019); Wallace & Gromit: Vengeance Most Fowl (2025) two Shaun the Sheep specials	no	Cracking Contraptions (2002); Shaun the Sheep (2007-); Timmy Time (2009–2012); Wallace and Gromit's World of Invention (2010)	no	various	Wallace & Gromit's Thrill-O-Matic two plays
Woody Woodpecker/Andy Panda (Walter Lantz)	yes	yes	**Theatrical Andy Panda short series** (starting in 1939 to 1952, with the short Knock Knock debuting the character of Woody Woodpecker); Theatrical Woody Woodpecker shorts (starting in 1940 to 1971)	Who Framed Roger Rabbit (1989) (cameo only); Woody Woodpecker (2017); Woody Woodpecker Goes to Camp (2024)	The Woody Woodpecker Show (1957–1958); The New Woody Woodpecker Show (1999–2001); Woody Woodpecker (2018)	live action segments in The Woody Woodpecker Show	various	theme park attractions The Woody Woodpecker Song

== Franchises originating in live-action films ==
Franchise (Creator)	Literature	Comics	Animated films	Live action films	Animated TV	Live action TV	Video games	Other media
Alien (Dan O'Bannon and Ronald Shusett)	Alien novel series	various	no	**Alien** (1979); Aliens (1986); Alien 3 (1992); Alien Resurrection (1997) Alien vs. Predator (2004); Aliens vs. Predator: Requiem (2007); Prometheus (2012); Alien: Covenant (2017); Alien: Romulus (2024)	Alien: Isolation – The Digital Series (2019)	Alien: Earth (2025)	various	-
Back to the Future (Robert Zemeckis and Bob Gale)	novelizations of the films	several	no	**Back to the Future** (1985); Back to the Future Part II (1989); Back to the Future Part III (1990)	Back to the Future (1991–1992)	no	yes	Back to the Future the Musical; Doc Brown Saves the World (2015)
Beetlejuice (Michael McDowell and Larry Wilson)	juvenile novels (1992)	yes (1991–1992)	no	**Beetlejuice** (1988); Beetlejuice Beetlejuice (2024)	Beetlejuice (1989–1991)	no	several	Beetlejuice musical (2018)
Bill & Ted (Chris Matheson and Ed Solomon)	yes	Bill & Ted's Excellent Comic Book (1991–1992)	no	**Bill & Ted's Excellent Adventure** (1989); Bill & Ted's Bogus Journey (1991); Bill & Ted Face the Music (2020)	Bill & Ted's Excellent Adventures (1990–1991)	Bill & Ted's Excellent Adventures (1992)	various	cereal musical
Buffyverse (Joss Whedon)	List of Buffyverse novels	List of Buffyverse comics	no	**Buffy the Vampire Slayer** (1992)	Animated pilot	Buffy the Vampire Slayer (1997–2003); Angel (1999–2004)	Buffy the Vampire Slayer video games	-
The Chronicles of Riddick / Pitch Black (David Twohy)	yes	no	The Chronicles of Riddick: Dark Fury (2004)	**Pitch Black** (2000); The Chronicles of Riddick (2004); Riddick (2013)	no	no	several	-
Clash of the Titans (Desmond Davis, Ray Harryhausen, and Charles H. Schneer)	novelisation	yes	no	Clash of the Titans (1981); Clash of the Titans (2010); Wrath of the Titans (2012)	no	no	Clash of the Titans (2010)	-
Evil Dead (Sam Raimi)	no	Army of Darkness comic book various	no	**The Evil Dead** (1981); Evil Dead II (1987); Army of Darkness (1992); Evil Dead (2013); reboot	no	Ash vs Evil Dead	several	Evil Dead: The Musical
The Expendables (David Callaham)	no	several	no	**The Expendables** (2010); The Expendables 2 (2012); The Expendables 3 (2014); Expend4bles (2023)	no	no	several	soundtracks
Final Destination (Jeffrey Reddick)	numerous novels	Final Destination: Sacrifice (2006); Final Destination: Spring Break (2006)	no	**Final Destination** (2000); Final Destination 2 (2003); Final Destination 3 (2006); The Final Destination (2009); Final Destination 5 (2011); Final Destination Bloodlines (2025)	no	no	no	-
Flipper (Arthur Weiss; Ricou Browning; Jack Cowden)	children's books	yes	no	**Flipper** (1963); Flipper's New Adventure (1964); Flipper (1996)	Flipper & Lopaka	Flipper (1964); Flipper (1995)	yes	no
Ghostbusters (Dan Aykroyd and Harold Ramis)	no	Ghostbusters (comics)	no	**Ghostbusters** (1984); Ghostbusters II (1989); Ghostbusters: Answer the Call (2016); Ghostbusters: Afterlife (2021); Ghostbusters: Frozen Empire (2024)	yes	no	yes	-
Godzilla (Ishirō Honda)	novels by Marc Cerasini	Godzilla (comics)	Godzilla: Planet of the Monsters	**Godzilla** (1954) numerous others	yes	yes	yes	music
Gremlins (Joe Dante)	novelization of the screenplay	no	no	**Gremlins** (1984); Gremlins 2: The New Batch (1990) Gremlins 3 (2027)	Gremlins: Secrets of the Mogwai (2022)	-	several	-
Halloween (John Carpenter and Debra Hill)	list of novels	List of comics	no	**Halloween**; List of films	no	no	Halloween	-
High School Musical (Kenny Ortega and Peter Barsocchini)	High School Musical (2006–2009)	yes	no	**High School Musical** (2006); High School Musical 2 (2007); High School Musical 3: Senior Year (2008)	no	High School Musical: Get in the Picture (2008); High School Musical: The Musical: The Series (2019–2023)	yes	High School Musical on Stage! (2006); High School Musical 2: On Stage! (2007); High School Musical: The Concert (2006–2009)
Highlander (Gregory Widen)	various	various	Highlander: The Search for Vengeance (2007)	**Highlander** (1986); Highlander II: The Quickening (1991); Highlander III: The Sorcerer (1994); Highlander: Endgame (2000); Highlander: The Source (2007)	Highlander: The Animated Series	Highlander: The Series; Highlander: The Raven	Highlander (1986); Highlander: The Last of the MacLeods (1995)	Highlander: The Card Game
Indiana Jones (George Lucas and Steven Spielberg)	yes	Indiana Jones (comics)	no	**Raiders of the Lost Ark** (1981); Indiana Jones and the Temple of Doom (1984); Indiana Jones and the Last Crusade (1989); Indiana Jones and the Kingdom of the Crystal Skull (2008); Indiana Jones and the Dial of Destiny (2023)	no	The Young Indiana Jones Chronicles	various	The Adventures of Indiana Jones Role-Playing Game by TSR and The World of Indiana Jones by West End Games
The Karate Kid (Robert Mark Kamen)	no	no	no	**The Karate Kid** (1984); The Karate Kid Part II (1986); The Karate Kid Part III (1989); The Next Karate Kid (1994); The Karate Kid (2010); Karate Kid: Legends (2025)	The Karate Kid (1989)	Cobra Kai (2018–2025)	The Karate Kid Part II: The Computer Game (1986); The Karate Kid (1987); Cobra Kai: The Karate Kid Saga Continues	
King Kong (Merian C. Cooper)	no	various	The Mighty Kong (1998)	**King Kong** (1933); numerous others	The King Kong Show (1966–1969); Kong: The Animated Series (2000)	no	various	King Kong musical (2013); amusement park rides
Marvel Cinematic Universe (Marvel Studios)	various	Marvel Cinematic Universe tie-in comics	no	**Iron Man** (2008) numerous other films	What If...? (2021-2024); I Am Groot (2022-2023); Your Friendly Neighborhood Spider-Man (2025–present); Eyes of Wakanda (2025); Marvel Zombies (2025)	various produced by Marvel Television various produced by Marvel Studios	various	various
The Matrix (The Wachowskis)	yes	The Matrix Comics Series 1-3 (1999-2003); The Matrix Comics Volumes 1 and 2 (2003-2004); The Matrix Comics: 20th Anniversary Edition (2019)	The Animatrix (2003)	**The Matrix** (1999); The Matrix Reloaded (2003); The Matrix Revolutions (2003); The Matrix Resurrections (2021)	no	no	Enter the Matrix (2003) several others	-
MonsterVerse (Legendary Pictures)	various	various	no	**Godzilla** (2014); Kong: Skull Island (2017); Godzilla: King of the Monsters (2019); Godzilla vs. Kong (2021); Godzilla x Kong: The New Empire (2024); Godzilla x Kong: Supernova (2027)	Skull Island (2023)	Monarch: Legacy of Monsters (2023-2026); Untitled Monarch: Legacy of Monsters spin-off (TBA)	various	soundtracks toys
The Pink Panther (Blake Edwards and Maurice Richlin)	yes	The Pink Panther and the Inspector	The Pink Phink (1964) various	**The Pink Panther** (1963); sequels and reboots	various	no	various	-
Police Academy (Paul Maslansky)	no	yes	no	**Police Academy** (1984) six sequels	Police Academy (1988)	Police Academy: The Series (1997)	no	Police Academy Stunt Show (1991)
Predator (Jim Thomas and John Thomas)	Predator novel series	List of Predator comics	The Predator Holiday Special (2018); Predator: Killer of Killers (2025)	**Predator** (1987) several other films	no	no	various	-
RoboCop (Edward Neumeier and Michael Miner)	RoboCop 2: A Novel	RoboCop (comics)	no	**RoboCop** (1987); RoboCop 2 (1990); RoboCop 3 (1993); RoboCop (2014)	RoboCop: The Animated Series (1988); RoboCop: Alpha Commando (1998−1999)	RoboCop: The Series (1994); RoboCop: Prime Directives (2001)	List of RoboCop video games	RoboCop the Ride
Rocky (Sylvester Stallone)	yes	no	no	**Rocky** (1976); Numerous sequels and spin-offs	no	no	Various	Rocky the Musical
Saw (James Wan and Leigh Whannell)	no	yes	no	**Saw** (2004); numerous sequels	no	no	Saw (2009); Saw II: Flesh & Blood (2010)	various theme parks, attractions and additional merchandise
Stargate (Roland Emmerich and Dean Devlin)	yes	List of Stargate comics	no	**Stargate** (1994)	Stargate Infinity	Stargate SG-1; Stargate Atlantis; Stargate Universe	Stargate: Resistance	-
Star Wars (George Lucas)	List of Star Wars books	Star Wars comics	Star Wars: The Clone Wars (2008)	**Star Wars** (1977) several other films	numerous	numerous	List of Star Wars video games	numerous
Terminator (James Cameron)	various	List of Terminator comics	no	**The Terminator** (1984) numerous sequels	no	Terminator: The Sarah Connor Chronicles (2008–2009)	List of Terminator video games	park attraction
Tron (Steven Lisberger)	yes	various	no	**Tron** (1982); Tron: Legacy (2010); Tron: Ares (2025)	Tron: Uprising (2012-2013)	no	various	
Universal Monsters (Universal Pictures)	See details	See details	Van Helsing: The London Assignment (2004)	**Dr. Jekyll and Mr. Hyde** (1913); 49 other theatrical releases; 4 direct-to-video releases	Monster Force (1994); The Mummy: The Animated Series (2001)	no	yes	Abbott and Costello Meet the Creature from the Black Lagoon (1954) home video collections theme park attractions and toys
Westworld (Michael Crichton)	no	no	no	**Westworld** (1973); Futureworld (1976)	no	Beyond Westworld (1980); Westworld (2016–2022)	Westworld 2000 (1996) various others	

== See also ==
- List of fictional shared universes in film and television – many multimedia franchises are based in fictional universes
- List of public domain works with multimedia adaptations
- List of highest-grossing media franchises
- Media mix
