= List of Megamind characters =

This is a list of characters that appear in the Megamind franchise.

== Main ==
- Megamind (voiced by Will Ferrell in the film and Keith Ferguson in the video game adaptations and sequel installments, Megamind vs. the Doom Syndicate and Megamind Rules!.) A big blue headed alien humanoid supervillain-turned-superhero who is always trying to take over the world. His archenemy, Metro Man is known for defeating him many times. Megamind was launched in an escape pod before his world was obliterated. He was just about to land in a mansion as a baby and have a true family but baby Metro Man had knocked him into the Metro City Prison. He has never won to Metro Man until he almost explodes an observatory on him. He is a parody of Lex Luthor and Brainiac while his "Space Dad" persona is a parody of both the physical resemblance of Jor-El as played by Marlon Brando in the 1978 film Superman and Brando's voice as Vito Corleone in The Godfather. The home release commentary notes that his costume and showmanship are purposely evocative of Alice Cooper. It was originally suggested that Ben Stiller would be cast as Megamind, and later Robert Downey Jr. but Will Ferrell was ultimately given the role, due to "scheduling conflicts" for Downey.
- Roxanne "Roxie" Ritchi (voiced by Tina Fey in the film, Megan Hollingshead in the video game adaptations and Laura Post in sequel installments, Megamind vs. the Doom Syndicate and Megamind Rules!.) A news reporter who seems to take a liking to Metro Man. She is a worker with her friend Hal She knows Megamind well even though she dislikes him. She is the third and final person to witness Metro Man's phony death. After Metro Man leaves, she tries to figure out Megamind's ways. In Megamind Rules!, she is elected mayor of Metro City. She is a parody of Lois Lane.
