= Megamind (franchise) =

DreamWorks Animation media franchise

- Created by: Alan Schoolcraft; Brent Simons
- Original work: Megamind (2010)
- Owners: DreamWorks Animation (Universal Pictures)
- Years: 2010–2024

Print publications
- Comics: DreamWorks' Megamind: Bad. Blue. Brilliant (2010–2011)

Films and television
- Films: Megamind (2010); Megamind vs. the Doom Syndicate (2024)
- Short film: Megamind: The Button of Doom (2011)
- Animated series: Megamind Rules! (2024)

Games
- Video game(s): Megamind: Ultimate Showdown (2010); Megamind: Mega Team Unite (2010); Megamind: The Blue Defender (2010)

Audio
- Soundtrack: Megamind: Music from the Motion Picture

Official website
- Megamind

Megamind is an American superhero comedy media franchise created and owned by DreamWorks Animation, which began with the 2010 animated feature film written by Alan J. Schoolcraft and Brent Simons. The franchise follows a supervillain named Megamind who suddenly gets a chance to defend Metro City from the forces of evil after the superhero Metro Man retires.

== Feature films ==
Film	U.S. release date	Director	Screenwriters	Producers
Megamind	November 5, 2010	Tom McGrath	Alan Schoolcraft and Brent Simons	Lara Breay and Denise Nolan Cascino
Megamind vs. the Doom Syndicate	March 1, 2024	Eric Fogel	Alan Schoolcraft and Brent Simons	

=== Megamind (2010) ===
Megamind is a 2010 American animated superhero comedy film directed by Tom McGrath, produced by DreamWorks Animation, and distributed by Paramount Pictures. It features the voices of Will Ferrell, Tina Fey, Jonah Hill, David Cross, and Brad Pitt.

The film tells the story of Megamind, a highly intelligent alien supervillain who becomes depressed after finally defeating his nemesis Metro Man. He creates a new superhero from Metro Man's DNA, but must become a hero himself when the new "hero" becomes a much more dangerous villain than he ever was.

The film was written by Alan J. Schoolcraft and Brent Simons. It was first titled Master Mind, and then Oobermind. It was suggested that Ben Stiller would be cast as Megamind, and later Robert Downey Jr. but Will Ferrell was ultimately given the role, due to "scheduling conflicts" for Downey.

In 2014, the film's distribution rights were purchased by DreamWorks Animation from Paramount Pictures and transferred to 20th Century Fox; the rights are now owned by Universal Pictures.

=== Megamind vs. the Doom Syndicate (2024) ===
In February 2024, a sequel film was announced to be released exclusively on Peacock on March 1, 2024.

== Short film ==
=== Megamind: The Button of Doom (2011) ===
Megamind: The Button of Doom is a 2011 animated short film directed by Simon J. Smith and written by Alan Schoolcraft and Brent Simons, released on DVD/Blu-ray with Megamind on February 25, 2011, starring Will Ferrell and David Cross. Produced by DreamWorks Animation and Pacific Data Images, the short sets after the events of the film to show off Megamind's first day as Defender of Metro City.

== Television series ==
=== Megamind Rules! (2024) ===
On February 11, 2022, it was announced that Peacock had ordered a CG animated series from DreamWorks Animation Television serving as a follow-up to the film, originally titled Megamind's Guide to Defending Your City. The series chronicles the new hero's quest to become a social media influencer and a true superhero. The original writers of the film, Alan Schoolcraft and Brent Simons, are signed on as executive producers and showrunners with Celebrity Deathmatch creator Eric Fogel. JD Ryznar is co-executive producer and story editor.

On August 5, 2022, Simons confirmed that the show's writing was completed and production was moving forward.

The series premiered on March 1, 2024.

== Cast and crew ==
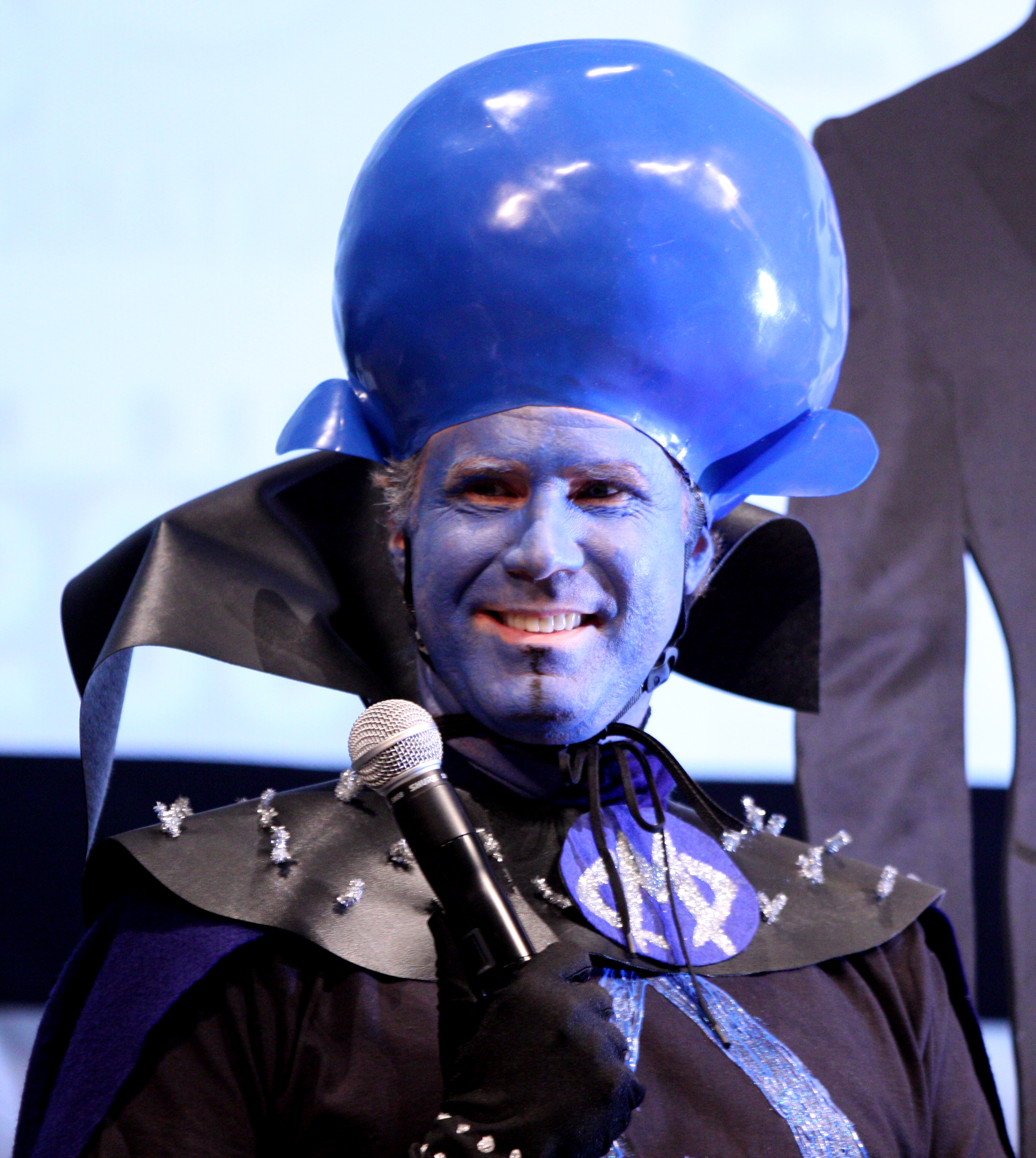
Will Ferrell dressed as Megamind in 2010

- ^{A} indicates an appearance through previously recorded material.
- ^{C} indicates a cameo appearance.
- ^{G} indicates the voice actor or actress was a guest appearance.

Characters	Films		Video games		Short film	Television series
Characters	Megamind	Megamind vs. the Doom Syndicate	Megamind: Ultimate Showdown	Megamind: Mega Team Unite	Megamind: The Button of Doom	Megamind Rules!
Megamind	Will Ferrell	Keith Ferguson	Keith Ferguson	Keith Ferguson	Will Ferrell	Keith Ferguson
Minion / Ol' Chum (Note: In the installments Megamind vs. the Doom Syndicate and Megamind Rules!, Minion has had his name changed to Ol' Chum.)	David Cross	Josh Brener	Drew Massey	Drew Massey	David Cross	Josh Brener
Roxanne Ritchi	Tina Fey	Laura Post	Megan Hollingshead	Megan Hollingshead		Laura Post
Hal Stewart / Tighten	Jonah Hill	Archive footage	Jonah Hill	Jonah Hill		
Metro Man / Music Man	Brad Pitt	Archive footage	Rick Pasqualone	Rick Pasqualone	Brad Pitt^{A}	Ross Marquand
The Warden	J. K. Simmons					
Bernard	Ben Stiller					
Jody Smelt	Stephen Kearin	Roger Craig Smith				Roger Craig Smith
Keiko Morita		Maya Aoki Tuttle				Maya Aoki Tuttle
Gail / Lady Doppler		Emily Tuñon				Emily Tuñon
Lord Nighty-Knight		Talon Warburton				Talon Warburton
Pierre Pressure		Scott Adsit				Scott Adist
Behemoth		Chris Sullivan				Chris Sullivan
Big King Fish		Todd Haberkorn				Todd Haberkorn^{G}
Blue Mackerel		Eric Murphy				Eric Murphy^{G}
Red Snapper		Joey Rudman				Joey Rudman^{G}
Melvin / Mr. Donut		Tony Hale				Tony Hale
Christina Christo		Jeanine Mason				Jeanine Mason
Polly 227		Eric Fogel				Eric Fogel
Eccentric Eddie		Micheal Beattie				Michael Beattie
Machiavillain		Adam Lambert^{C}				Adam Lambert
Destruction Worker (Note: In the Megamind video games, the character of Destruction Worker is male and does not appear with a real name. In Megamind Rules, the character is female and is known as Carla Magucci.)			Fred Tatasciore	Fred Tatasciore		Brooke Dillman
Psycho Delic			Keith David	Keith David		
Hot Flash			Cara Pifko	Cara Pifko		
Judge Sludge				Monte Markham		
Lance Lafontaine				Cam Clarke		
The Conductor				Danny Jacobs		
Mega-Megamind					Will Ferrell	
Damien					Jordan Alexander Hauser	
Mrs. Donut						G.K. Bowes
Blanche Morita						Jenny Yokobori
Dan Donner / Hu-Mouse						Haley Joel Osment
Dude Monkey						Max Mittelman
Terry Sasko / Supercool Power-Kid						Natalia Del Riego
Benett Schlurg-Peterman						Jeremy Jordan
Bad Guy Brad						Eric Bauza

== Additional crew and production details ==
Film	Detail					
Film	Executive Producers	Composers	Editor	Production companies	Distributing companies	Running time
Megamind	Ben Stiller and Stuart Cornfeld	Hans Zimmer and Lorne Balfe	Michael Andrews	DreamWorks Animation; Pacific Data Images	Paramount Pictures	1hr 36mins
Megamind vs. the Doom Syndicate		Matthew Janszen and Bryan Winslow		DreamWorks Animation Television	Peacock	1hr 25mins

== Reception ==
=== Box office performance ===
Film	Release date	Box office gross			Budget	Ref.
Film	Release date	North America	Other territories	Worldwide	Budget	Ref.
Megamind	November 5, 2010	$148,415,853	$173,469,912	$321,885,765	$130 million	

=== Critical and public response ===
Film	Rotten Tomatoes	Metacritic	CinemaScore
Megamind	73% (179 reviews)	63 (33 reviews)	A−

== In other media ==
=== Video games ===
Year	Title	Developer(s)	Publisher	Platform(s)	Ref.
2010	Megamind: Ultimate Showdown	THQ Studio Australia	THQ	Xbox 360, PlayStation 3	
2010	Megamind: Mega Team Unite	THQ Studio Australia	THQ	Wii	
2010	Megamind: The Blue Defender	Tantalus Media	THQ	PSP, DS	
2019	DreamWorks Universe of Legends	Firefly Games; Riva Games; YYTX Game	N/A	iOS, Android	
2023	DreamWorks All-Star Kart Racing	Bamtang Games	GameMill Entertainment	Nintendo Switch, PlayStation 5, PlayStation 4, Microsoft Windows, Xbox Series X and Series S, Xbox One	

=== Comics ===
After signing a licensing deal with DreamWorks in 2010, the comics publisher Ape Entertainment produced a four-issue Megamind comics series titled DreamWorks' Megamind: Bad. Blue. Brilliant (2010–2011).

== Music ==
=== Soundtracks ===
Title	U.S. release date	Length	Label
Megamind: Music from the Motion Picture	November 2, 2010	48:10	Lakeshore Records
