= Rick Pasqualone =

American actor (born 1965 or 1966)

- Born: March 30, 1966 (age 60)
- Occupation: Actor
- Years active: 1993–present
- Spouse: Denise Fennell (m. 2021)

Richard Rocco "Rick" Pasqualone (born March 30, 1966) is an American actor. He is best known for his voice roles as Vito Scaletta in Mafia II and Doctor Strange in various media.

== Career ==
Pasqualone first started acting in 1990 when he was cast as Tony in the long-running Off-Broadway series Tony N' Tina's Wedding. He later made his Broadway debut in the Neil Simon comedy Proposals. His first film role was in the 1996 short film Tales of Erotica, which also starred a young Mira Sorvino. In addition to television, Pasqualone also does voice-over work for commercials and video games. His works include Civilization V, Halo 5: Guardians, Batman: Arkham Knight, The Darkness II, and Grand Theft Auto V. In 2009, he became the new voice of Aldo Trapani in The Godfather II. In 2010, he voiced Vito Scaletta, the main protagonist of Mafia II and a supporting character in Mafia III. He was also the voice of Diego in the video game Ice Age: Dawn of the Dinosaurs and Dan Turpin in The Death of Superman.

== Filmography ==
=== Film ===
Year	Title	Role	Notes
1996	Tales of Erotica	Joey	Segment: "The Dutch Master"
1997	Romy and Michele's High School Reunion	Mark Black	
2011	Hop	Utility Voice	
2018	The Death of Superman	Dan Turpin (voice)	Direct-to-video
2020	Greenland	National News Anchor	
2020	The SpongeBob Movie: Sponge on the Run	Dealer (voice)	Credited as Richard Pasqualone
2020	Mank	Singer	

=== Television ===
Year	Title	Role	Notes
1995	Weird Science	Robber	Episode: "Rock Hard Chett"
1995	Kirk	Ronnie	Episode: "Helloween"
1995	Star Trek: Deep Space Nine	Toral	Episode: "The Sword of Kahless"
1996	Caroline in the City	Blade	Episode: "Caroline and the Movie"
1996	Moloney	Greg Harrison	Episode: "Nothing But the Truth"
1996–2005	JAG	Lieutenant Kyle, Captain David White	3 episodes
1997	USA High	Giuseppe Ferrari	2 episodes
1998	Vengeance Unlimited	Internal Affairs Investigator	Episode: "Justice"
1999	Love Boat: The Next Wave	Charlie	Episode: "Prom Queen"
1999	Friends	Croupier	3 episodes
2000	Falcone	Al "Ruby" Rubirosa	Episode: "Double Exposure"
2002	NYPD Blue	Uniform	3 episodes
2003	CSI: Crime Scene Investigation	Club Owner	Episode: "Lady Heather's Box"
2003	NCIS	Corporal Paul Dafelmair	Episode: "Hung Out to Dry"
2004	Charmed	Lips	Episode: "Charmed Noir"
2005	Without a Trace	Tony	Episode: "Party Girl"
2005	Blind Justice	Anthony Knowles	Episode: "Fancy Footwork"
2006	CSI: NY	Q.T. Jammer	Episode: "Risk"
2006	Celebrity Deathmatch	Robert De Niro (voice)	Episode: "Robert De Niro vs. James Gandolfini"
2007	Shark	Max Lundy	Episode: "Fall from Grace"
2008	Crash	Warren	Episode: "The Doctor Is In"
2009–10	Family Guy	Tony, Richard Dawson (voices)	2 episodes
2010	Desperate Housewives	Detective John Booth	Episode: "The Ballad of Booth"
2010	All My Children	Charles Michaelson	3 episodes
2011	Glee	Al Motta	Episode: "I Am Unicorn"
2012	Childrens Hospital	Italian	Episode: "Wisedocs"
2013	The Young and the Restless	Ken	3 episodes
2013	Melissa & Joey	Eliot	Episode: "A New Kind of Family Christmas"
2016	Transformers: Robots in Disguise	Buzzstrike (voice)	4 episodes
2018, 2024	General Hospital	Vincent Marino, WSB Agent Jeffreys	2 episodes
2020	Cosmos: A Spacetime Odyssey	Mosso's Ghost	Episode: "The Cosmic Connectome"
2022	NCIS: Los Angeles	Martin Henderson	Episode: "Live Free or Die Standing"
2024	Tulsa King	Joe Bats	2 episodes

=== Video games ===
Year	Title	Role	Notes
2005	The Matrix: Path of Neo	Red Pill Security Guard, SWAT Soldier	
2006	Rise of Nations: Rise of Legends	Carlini	
2006	Made Man	Joey Verola	
2006	The Sopranos: Road to Respect	Mario, Tuzzio, Additional Voices	
2008	Command & Conquer 3: Kane's Wrath	Additional Voices	
2008	Resistance 2	Black Ops Soldier	
2008	Destroy All Humans! Path of the Furon	Mikey Molinari	
2008	Space Chimps	Zartog	
2009	Grey's Anatomy: The Video Game	Additional Voices	
2009	Leisure Suit Larry: Box Office Bust	Soccer Hooligan	
2009	The Godfather II	Aldo Trapani, Policeman, Senate Committee Chairman, Additional Voices	
2009	Infamous	Male Pedestrian	
2009	Red Faction: Guerilla	Additional Voices	Uncredited
2009	Ice Age: Dawn of the Dinosaurs	Diego	
2010	Army of Two: The 40th Day	Zoo Worker, Arms Dealer	
2010	Prison Break: The Conspiracy	Gus Fiorello	
2010	Dead to Rights: Retribution	GAC Commanders, Cops, Temple Guards, Brawlers	
2010	Ninety-Nine Nights II	Maggni	
2010	Mafia II	Vito Scaletta, Giuseppe, Gangsters	
2010	Civilization V	Son	
2010	Medal of Honor	"Jimmy" / SPC. DeSoto	
2010	Fallout: New Vegas	Daniel	Honest Hearts DLC
2010	Megamind: Mega Team Unite	Metro Man	
2010	Megamind: Ultimate Showdown	Metro Man	
2011	Marvel vs. Capcom 3: Fate of Two Worlds	Doctor Strange	Also Ultimate
2011	Ace Combat: Assault Horizon	Bravo 8, AWACS	
2012	The Darkness II	Vinnie, additional voices	
2012	Resistance: Burning Skies	Kirby, Scientist, Army Soldier, Civilian, Minuteman, Pilot	
2012	Spec Ops: The Line	Agent Daniels, Damned Gunner	
2013	Marvel Heroes	Jamie Madrox, Gambit	
2013	The Bureau: XCOM Declassified	XCOM Agent	
2013	Grand Theft Auto V	The Local Population	
2014	Watch Dogs	Chicago Male Civilian	
2015	Batman: Arkham Knight	Additional Voices	
2015	Halo 5: Guardians	Additional Voices	
2015	King's Quest	Adult Alexander	
2016	Mafia III	Vito Scaletta	
2019	Marvel Ultimate Alliance 3: The Black Order	Remy LeBeau / Gambit	Rise of the Phoenix DLC
2020	Mafia: Definitive Edition	Vito Scaletta	
2022	Saints Row	Character Voices, Law Enforcement	
2022	Marvel's Midnight Suns	Doctor Strange	
2023	Teenage Mutant Ninja Turtles: Splintered Fate	The Chairman	
2023	Starfield	Deimos Staryard Announcer, Ernesto, Glenn Markham, Marines	
2024	Suicide Squad: Kill the Justice League	Mikron O'Jeneus / Gizmo	
2024	Call of Duty: Black Ops 6	Caine	
2025	Avowed	Additional Voices	
2025	Mafia: The Old Country	Giuseppe Palminteri	

=== Web series ===
Year	Title	Role	Notes
2016	Guidance	Governor James	2 episodes
