= DreamWorks All-Star Kart Racing =

2023 video game

- Developer: Bamtang Games
- Publisher: GameMill Entertainment
- Composers: Carlos Bozzo; Diego Villafuerte
- Series: DreamWorks Animation
- Platforms: Nintendo Switch; PlayStation 4 PlayStation 5 Windows; Xbox One; Xbox Series X/S
- Release: WW: November 3, 2023
- Genre: Kart racing game
- Modes: Single-player, multiplayer

DreamWorks All-Star Kart Racing is a crossover kart-racing game developed by Bamtang Games and published by GameMill Entertainment. The game was released on November 3, 2023, for Nintendo Switch, PlayStation 4, PlayStation 5, Windows, Xbox One, and Xbox Series X/S.

== Gameplay ==
Similar to GameMill's Nickelodeon Kart Racers trilogy, All-Star Kart Racing features 20 playable DreamWorks Animation characters from Shrek, Madagascar, Kung Fu Panda, How to Train Your Dragon, Megamind, Trolls, The Boss Baby, and The Bad Guys; two additional characters are available in a downloadable content pack. 20 race tracks are present, with five of the six cups using four for each cup. While not playable, the titular Trolls characters have a major presence as the hosts of each race, which feature unique gimmicks such as extra musical notes and unique hazards. They also hop onto the karts when a driver collects enough Musical Notes on the tracks. Upon obtaining a certain amount of notes, there are "Troll Surprises" that function as special items.

=== Playable Characters ===
Counting downloadable content, DreamWorks All-Star Kart Racing features 22 playable characters from across 8 franchises. Of these, 8 are available from the start in the base game, 12 are unlocked by fulfilling certain conditions in gameplay, and 2 are paid downloadable content.

=== Voice cast ===
==== Shrek ====
- Michael Gough as Shrek
- Piotr Michael as Lord Farquaad (Note: Unlockable)
- Holly Fields as Fiona
- Dean Edwards as Donkey
- Margarita Reymundo as Kitty Softpaws
- Eric Bauza as Puss in Boots
- Adam Gifford as Wolf (Note: Downloadable content)

==== Kung Fu Panda ====
- Fred Tatasciore as Master Shifu
- Mick Wingert as Po
- Jane Perry as Tigress
- Randall Duk Kim as Grand Master Oogway

==== The Bad Guys ====
- Michael Godere as Mr. Wolf
- Bryce Charles as Diane Foxington

==== Madagascar ====
- Crispin Freeman as Alex
- Danny Jacobs as King Julien

==== The Boss Baby ====
- Maurice LaMarche as Theodore Templeton
- Mary Faber as Tina Templeton

==== Trolls ====
- Eliza Schneider as Bridget
- James Arnold Taylor as King Gristle

==== How to Train Your Dragon ====
- Angela Bartys as Astrid
- James Arnold Taylor as Hiccup

==== Megamind ====
- Nolan North as Megamind

== Development ==
DreamWorks All-Star Kart Racing was announced on July 25, 2023. A gameplay trailer was released in October 2023, followed by a launch trailer released on November 2, a day before the initial release.

== Reception ==
DreamWorks All-Star Kart Racing received "mixed or average" reviews, according to review aggregator Metacritic. The game had praise for its visual designs and voice acting, while criticism was towards its varied power-ups, attacks, and the lack of other familiar DreamWorks characters.
