= Inception (soundtrack) =

Inception: Music from the Motion Picture

Soundtrack album by Hans Zimmer
- Released: July 13, 2010
- Genre: Film score
- Length: 49:13
- Label: Reprise
- Producers: Hans Zimmer; Lorne Balfe; Christopher Nolan; Alex Gibson

Hans Zimmer chronology
Through the Wormhole (2010)	Inception: Music from the Motion Picture (2010)	Megamind (2010)

Inception: Music from the Motion Picture is the soundtrack to the 2010 film of the same name directed by Christopher Nolan, released under Reprise Records on July 13, 2010. Hans Zimmer scored the film, marking his third collaboration with Nolan following Batman Begins and The Dark Knight.

== Production ==
According to Zimmer, the soundtrack for Inception is "a very electronic score". Nolan asked Zimmer to compose and finish the score as he was shooting the film. The composer said, "He wanted to unleash my imagination in the best possible way". At one point, while composing the score, Zimmer incorporated a guitar sound reminiscent of Ennio Morricone and was interested in having Johnny Marr, former guitarist in the influential 80s rock band The Smiths, play these parts. Zimmer's reported inspiration was finding a synthesizer track that he had written similar to Marr's guitar style. Nolan agreed with Zimmer's suggestion, and then Zimmer approached Marr, who accepted his offer. Marr spent four 12-hour days working on the score, playing notes written by Zimmer with a 12-string guitar.

For inspiration, Zimmer read Gödel, Escher, Bach: An Eternal Golden Braid by Douglas Hofstadter because it combined "the idea of playfulness in mathematics and playfulness in music". Zimmer did not assemble a temp score but "every now and then they would call and say 'we need a little something here.' But that was OK because much of the music pieces aren't that scene-specific. They fall into little categories". While writing the screenplay, Nolan wrote in Édith Piaf's "Non, je ne regrette rien" but almost took it out when he cast Marion Cotillard, who had just completed an Oscar-winning turn as Piaf in the 2007 film La Vie en rose. Zimmer convinced Nolan to keep it in the film and also integrated elements of the song into his score; in particular, the film's iconic brass instrument fanfare resembles a slowed-down version of the song's instrumentation.

The trailers for the film feature specially composed music by Zack Hemsey, which does not appear on the official soundtrack. The soundtrack was nominated for several awards, including an Academy Award, a Golden Globe, a Grammy and a BAFTA.

== Critical reception ==
Professional ratings
Review scores
Source	Rating
AllMusic	4/5 stars
Empire	4/5 stars
Filmtracks	2/5 stars
Killerfilm	4/5 stars
ScoreNotes	3.5/5 stars

James Southall of Movie Wave awarded the score five stars, calling it "Zimmer’s finest work in a number of years", and Jim Lochner of Film Score Click Track, who said "Inception is one thrilling and trippy [...] musical ride", awarding the score four and a half stars out of five.

== Track listing ==
All music is composed by Hans Zimmer.

Inception: Music from the Motion Picture
No.	Title	Length
1.	"Half Remembered Dream"	1:12
2.	"We Built Our Own World"	1:55
3.	"Dream Is Collapsing"	2:28
4.	"Radical Notion"	3:43
5.	"Old Souls"	7:44
6.	"528491"	2:23
7.	"Mombasa"	4:54
8.	"One Simple Idea"	2:28
9.	"Dream Within a Dream"	5:04
10.	"Waiting for a Train"	9:30
11.	"Paradox"	3:25
12.	"Time"	4:35
Total length:		49:13

Bonus tracks
No.	Title	Length
13.	"Projections"	7:04
14.	"Don't Think About Elephants"	5:35
Total length:		12:39

== Certifications ==
Region	Certification	Certified units/sales
United Kingdom (BPI)	Silver	60,000^{‡}
^{‡} Sales+streaming figures based on certification alone.
