= Tales of Erotica =

- Directed by: Susan Seidelman; Bob Rafelson; Ken Russell; Melvin Van Peebles
- Written by: Susan Seidelman; Bob Rafelson; Ken Russell; Melvin Van Peebles
- Produced by: Ronaldo Vasconcellos; Jonathan Brett; Melvin Van Peebles; Noah Golden
- Starring: Mira Sorvino; Aida Turturro; Sharon Angela; Cynda Williams; Arliss Howard; Kathleen Wilhoite; John Toles-Bey; Hetty Baynes; Simon Shepherd; Richard Barboza; Laura Lane; Dewar Zazee; Kim Smith
- Cinematography: Hong Manley; Maryse Alberti; Igor Sunara; Theo van de Sande
- Edited by: Xavier Russell; Mona Davis; Melvin Van Peebles; Michael Elliot
- Music by: Wendy Blackstone; Melvin Van Peebles; David McHugh
- Distributed by: Trimark Pictures
- Release date: 1996
- Running time: 103 minutes
- Countries: Germany; United States
- Language: English

Title card from Vrooom Vroom Vroooom

Tales of Erotica (also known as Erotic Tales) is a 1996 compilation of four erotic short films directed by Ken Russell, Susan Seidelman, Melvin Van Peebles, and Bob Rafelson.

== Shorts featured ==
Year	Title	Director	Screenplay	Synopsis	Duration
1993	The Insatiable Mrs. Kirsch	Ken Russell	Ken Russell	A beautiful woman (Hetty Baynes) is followed by a stranger (Simon Shepherd) who is lured into her world by the noises he hears coming from her chamber.	27:00
1994	The Dutch Master	Susan Seidelman	Susan Seidelman, Jonathan Brett	Teresa (Mira Sorvino) is a woman fascinated by a young man (Rick Pasqualone) in a Dutch painting that comes to life. She escapes into the living painting to fulfill her secret desires.	32:00
1995	Vrooom Vroom Vroooom	Melvin Van Peebles	Melvin Van Peebles	Leroy (Richard Barboza) saves an elderly woman (Laura Lane) with voodoo powers from being run over by a bus, and receives a motorcycle that transforms into an attractive woman.	29:00
1995	Wet	Bob Rafelson	Bob Rafelson	Bruce Lomann (Arliss Howard) is a hot tub salesman who is seduced after-hours by a beautiful woman named Davida (Cynda Williams) in a hot tub.	27:00

== Legacy ==
In 1996, "Erotic Tales: An International Series" began on Westdeutscher Rundfunk (German television). Regina Ziegler, a German producer, with Westdeutscher Rundfunk, under the series title Die schönste Sache der Welt (The Most Beautiful Thing in the World) hopes to continue the series for 69 episodes.

In 2001, The Museum of Modern Art presented 24 of the half-hour films.

In 2004, the series consisted of 10 programs running approximately 90 minutes each, that played in Chicago. This series included the film shorts by the directors: Susan Seidelman, Ken Russell, Bob Rafelson and Melvin Van Peebles.

By 2016, a four-DVD set of 30 Short Films was released by Umbrella Entertainment and distributed in Australia by Special Broadcasting Service.
