= Keith Ferguson (voice actor) =

American voice actor

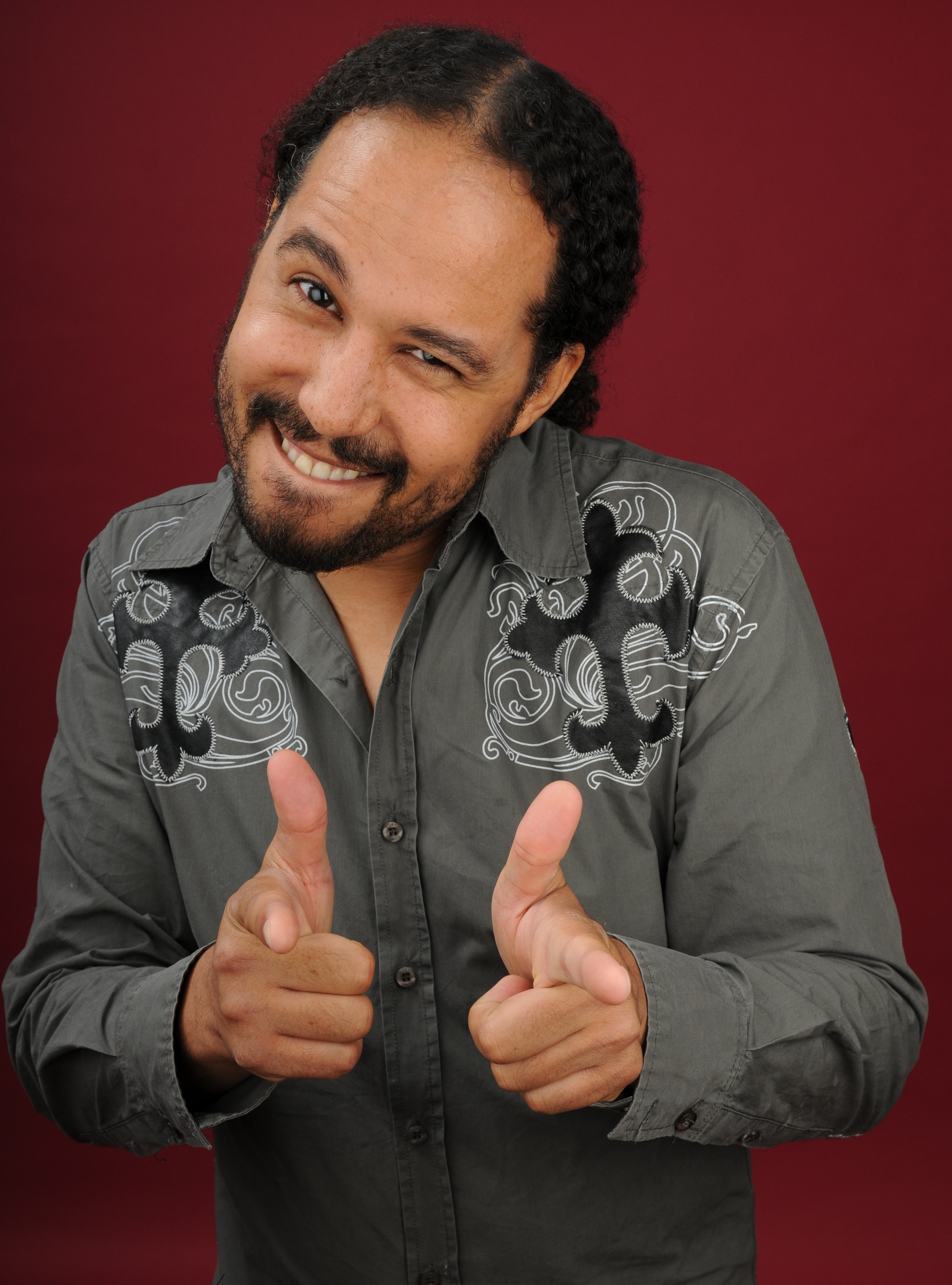
- Ferguson in 2010
- Education: University of the Pacific; University of Southern California
- Occupation: Voice actor
- Years active: 1999–present

Keith Ferguson (born February 26, 1972) is an American voice actor. He is known for his voice work as Bloo from Foster's Home for Imaginary Friends, Flintheart Glomgold in the 2017 reboot of DuckTales, Basch fon Ronsenburg from Final Fantasy XII, Marluxia from Kingdom Hearts, Lord Hater from Wander Over Yonder, Lord Saladin from Destiny and Destiny 2, Reaper from Overwatch and Ronin from Titanfall 2. He also provides a number of sound-alike portrayals, including Harrison Ford as Han Solo and Indiana Jones on Robot Chicken, Will Ferrell as the titular character in Megamind and Owen Wilson as Lightning McQueen in the Cars franchise.

== Early life ==
Ferguson was born on February 26, 1972.

== Career ==
Towards the end of his production career, Ferguson actively began his pursuit of a career in voice-over. In 1999, while working on what would turn out to be his last full-time position in television production, a voice-over agent named Pat Brady, after discovering Ferguson the week prior in a voice-over workshop in Toluca Lake, California, and before even officially signing with him for representation, sent him out on what would be his first professional voice-over audition (a sound-alike for Keanu Reeves in a 60-second radio spot satirizing The Matrix for the former Hollywood Video movie-rental franchise). He ended up booking the role from this first VO audition, after which he officially signed with Pat Brady who, through two talent agencies, would continue to represent him to this day.

In 2000, he gained his first experience in animation voice-over alongside Rob Paulsen and David Sobolov having booked the role of Ray on the CGI-animated web-series Li'l Green Men featured on Warner Bros. former website Entertaindom. After the next 3 years while building up his voice-over repertoire with various roles in commercial spots, video games, animation and sound-alike voice-matching for various films, he would be cast in one of the first of his more notable roles being that of Bloo in Foster's Home for Imaginary Friends created by The Powerpuff Girls animator Craig McCracken. This was accompanied by other notable performances such as Thunderbolt Ross in the animated series The Avengers: Earth's Mightiest Heroes, Friend Owl in the feature Bambi II, as well as his recurring portrayal as Harrison Ford's Han Solo and Indiana Jones in Robot Chicken along with the Star Wars parodies. He reprised his voice role as Han Solo in the 2014 film The Lego Movie.

Amidst further various vocal appearances in animation, a few of which include credits on Family Guy, Adventure Time, Phineas and Ferb, Codename: Kids Next Door, The Grim Adventures of Billy & Mandy, Legion of Super Heroes, and Harvey Birdman, Attorney at Law, Ferguson also found a role in Cars Toons: Mater's Tall Tales subbing for Owen Wilson as Lightning McQueen.

Ferguson has also done voice work in video games; notable roles include Basch fon Ronsenburg in Final Fantasy XII, Gabranth in Dissidia Final Fantasy and Dissidia 012 Final Fantasy and Marluxia in the Kingdom Hearts series beginning with Kingdom Hearts Re: Chain of Memories (2008).

Ferguson was also vocally featured as two differently styled race-announcers in two TV commercials for the sports beverage, Vitamin Water; one featuring race-car driver Carl Edwards with Ralph Macchio paying homage to his role in The Karate Kid, and the other a Super Bowl ad featuring Shaquille O'Neal as an unlikely victorious horse-race jockey.

== Filmography ==
=== Film ===
List of voice performances in direct-to-video, feature and television films
| Year | Title | Role | Notes | Source |
|---|---|---|---|---|
| 2000 | The Defender | Additional voices | DVD English dub | |
| 2000 | The Legend | Additional voices | DVD English dub | |
| 2000 | Gen^{13} | Additional voices | | |
| 2003 | The Death of Batman | Additional voices | Short film | |
| 2006 | Cars | Lightning McQueen | Deleted scenes only | |
| 2006 | Hellboy: Sword of Storms | Additional voices | | |
| 2006 | Bambi II | Friend Owl | | |
| 2006 | Ultimate Avengers | Additional voices | | |
| 2008 | Destination: Imagination | Bloo, Captain, Francis | | |
| 2011 | Larry & Lydia | Larry | | |
| 2011 | Batman: Year One | Jefferson Skeevers | | |
| 2012 | Cartoon Network 20th Anniversary | Bloo | | |
| 2013 | Monsters University | Additional voices | | |
| 2014 | The Lego Movie | Han Solo | | |
| 2014 | Legends of Oz: Dorothy's Return | Additional voices | | |
| 2015 | Batman Unlimited: Animal Instincts | Gruff Cop, Distinguished Man | | |
| 2015 | Inside Out | Additional voices | | |
| 2015 | Minions | Additional voices | | |
| 2016 | Norm of the North | Human Tourist | | |
| 2016 | Elena and the Secret of Avalor | Zuzo | | |
| 2017 | Transformers: The Last Knight | Knight of Iacon | | |
| 2017 | Miss Fritter's Racing Skoool | Lightning McQueen | Short film | |
| 2019 | Toy Story 4 | Additional voices | | |
| 2019 | Batman vs. Teenage Mutant Ninja Turtles | Baxter Stockman, Two-Face | | |
| 2019 | DC Showcase: Sgt. Rock | Matthew Shrieve | | |
| 2020 | We Bare Bears: The Movie | Officer Murphy | | |
| 2020 | Batman: Death in the Family | Gangster | | |
| 2021 | Justice Society: World War II | Doctor Fate | | |
| 2022 | Teen Titans Go! & DC Super Hero Girls: Mayhem in the Multiverse | Batman | | |
| 2023 | Once Upon a Studio | Prince Charming | Short film | |
| 2024 | Megamind vs. the Doom Syndicate | Megamind | Replacing Will Ferrell | |
| 2024 | Justice League: Crisis on Infinite Earths | Doctor Fate, Atomic Knight, Two-Face | | |

=== Animation ===
List of voice performances in animation
| Year | Title | Role | Notes | Source |
|---|---|---|---|---|
| 2004–09 | Foster's Home for Imaginary Friends | Blooregard Q. "Bloo" Kazoo, additional voices | | |
| 2005–07 | Family Guy | Cobra Commander, Jimmy Smits, additional voices | | |
| 2006 | Four Eyes! | Syler | | |
| 2006 | Codename: Kids Next Door | Numbuh 1-Love | | |
| 2006 | The Grim Adventures of Billy & Mandy | Hip-Hop-Itmus-Prime, H2O, Thug #1, Sweetie, Morg, Creature Reporter | 3 episodes | |
| 2006 | Harvey Birdman, Attorney at Law | Bill Ken Sebben | Episode: "Birdnapped" | |
| 2007–present | Robot Chicken | Indiana Jones, Han Solo, Various | | |
| 2007 | Legion of Super Heroes | Karate Kid, Nemesis Kid | Episode: "The Karate Kid" | |
| 2007 | Robot Chicken: Star Wars | Han Solo, C-3PO, Imperial Probe Droid | Television special | |
| 2008 | Robot Chicken: Star Wars Episode II | Han Solo, General Veers | Television special | |
| 2008–12 | Phineas and Ferb | Additional voices | 4 episodes | |
| 2008–13 | Cars Toons | Lightning McQueen | | |
| 2010 | Robot Chicken: Star Wars Episode III | Han Solo | Television special | |
| 2010 | The Cartoonstitute | Khan | Episode: "The Awesome Chronicles of Manny and Khan" | |
| 2010–12 | The Avengers: Earth's Mightiest Heroes | Thunderbolt Ross | | |
| 2010–13 | Mad | Han Solo, Jon Arbuckle, additional voices | | |
| 2010–18 | Adventure Time | Prince Gumball, various voices | Replacing Neil Patrick Harris | |
| 2011 | G.I. Joe: Renegades | Heavy Duty, Hershel Dalton | Episode: "Cousins" | |
| 2012 | Super Best Friends Forever | Superman, Solomon Grundy | | |
| 2012 | Talking Friends | Talking Pierre | | |
| 2012–16 | Gravity Falls | Deputy Durland, Testosterauer, Glurk, additional voices | | |
| 2013 | Amethyst, Princess of Gemworld | Prince Topaz, Skeleton | | |
| 2013–15 | Randy Cunningham: 9th Grade Ninja | Greg | | |
| 2013–16 | Wander Over Yonder | Lord Hater, additional voices | | |
| 2014–18 | Sofia the First | Sir Bartleby, additional voices | | |
| 2015 | Fresh Beat Band of Spies | Additional voices | 3 episodes | |
| 2015–19 | New Looney Tunes | Viktor | | |
| 2015–19 | We Bare Bears | Officer Murphy, additional voices | | |
| 2016–17 | Voltron: Legendary Defender | King Alfor, additional voices | | |
| 2016–18 | Lost in Oz | Reigh, additional voices | | |
| 2016–19 | Star vs. the Forces of Evil | Chet, additional voices | 3 episodes | |
| 2016–20 | Elena of Avalor | Zuzo, Sir Cassius, additional voices | | |
| 2017 | Jeff & Some Aliens | Homeless Guy | Episode: "Jeff & Some Colonists" | |
| 2017 | Billy Dilley's Super-Duper Subterranean Summer | Guard | Episode: "Lab Friends... Forever?" | |
| 2017–20 | Rapunzel's Tangled Adventure | Additional voices | 9 episodes | |
| 2017–21 | DuckTales | Flintheart Glomgold, Megavolt, Liquidator, additional voices | | |
| 2018–20 | Unikitty! | Eaglelator | 3 episodes | |
| 2018 | Bunnicula | Various voices | | |
| 2018 | Apple & Onion | Pizza, various voices | | |
| 2019 | DC Super Hero Girls | Jeremiah Danvers, Robin, Alfred Pennyworth, Sinestro, Batman, various voices | 25 episodes | |
| 2019 | Scooby-Doo and Guess Who? | Various voices | 5 episodes | |
| 2019 | The Loud House | Narrator, High Roller Attendant, Dunk Tank Attendant | Episode:"Kings of the Con" | |
| 2019 | Green Eggs and Ham | Additional voices | 11 episodes | |
| 2020 | Amphibia | Judro Hasselback, Heathro Hasselback, Talbert Hasselback, Bailey's Dad | Episode: "The Ballad of Hopediah Planter" | |
| 2020 | Big City Greens | Tuck, additional voices | Episode: "Times Circle" | |
| 2020 | Infinity Train | Various voices | 6 episodes | |
| 2020 | Victor and Valentino | Teo, additional voices | Episode: "Old Man Teo" | |
| 2020 | Animaniacs | Alan Grant | Episode: "Jurassic Lark" | |
| 2020–21 | Summer Camp Island | FM Dog, Ghost Pendarvis, additional voices | 2 episodes | |
| 2021 | Looney Tunes Cartoons | Cecil Turtle, Champ | 2 episodes | |
| 2021 | Kid Cosmic | Papa G, Carl | Main cast | |
| 2021 | No Activity | Additional voices | Episode: "It's Not a Cult" | |
| 2021 | This Duckburg Life | Flintheart Glomgold, additional voices | Podcast miniseries | |
| 2021 | Beebo Saves Christmas | Fleabo | Television special | |
| 2022 | The Cuphead Show! | Bowlboy and Light Bulb | | |
| 2022 | Wolfboy and the Everything Factory | Orange and Blue Bird Spryte | Episode: "We Search Above" | |
| 2022 | Kung Fu Panda: The Dragon Knight | Augustus, Benny, Horse | 2 episodes | |
| 2022–25 | Bugs Bunny Builders | Wile E. Coyote | | |
| 2023 | Harley Quinn | Steppenwolf, Jonas | Episode: "The First Person to Come Back From a Business Conference Without Chlamydia" | |
| 2023–26 | Chibiverse | Flintheart Glomgold, Lord Hater, Killbot 86 | 4 episodes | |
| 2023–24 | Hailey's On It! | Various voices | 10 episodes | |
| 2024 | Megamind Rules! | Megamind | | |
| 2024 | Star Wars: Tales of the Empire | The Governor | Episode: "Realization" | |
| 2024 | Max & the Midknights | Various voices | 4 episodes | |
| 2024 | Creature Commandos | Knight, Host | Episode: "Cheers to the Tin Man" | |
| 2024–25 | Tomb Raider: The Legend of Lara Croft | British Museum Director, Guest #4 | 3 episodes | |

=== Video games ===
List of voice performances in video games
| Year | Title | Role | Notes | Source |
|---|---|---|---|---|
| 2004 | The Chronicles of Riddick: Escape from Butcher Bay | Guard | | |
| 2004 | Tales of Symphonia | Additional voices | | |
| 2004 | Doom 3 | Additional voices | | |
| 2004 | Terminator 3: The Redemption | John Connor, Pilot, Techcom Voices | | |
| 2004 | Shark Tale | Shark Diner #1, Dolphin Cop #2, Whale Washer #2 | | |
| 2004 | Men of Valor | Black Marine #3, Pilot | | |
| 2004 | EverQuest II | Additional voices | | |
| 2004 | Metal Gear Solid 3: Snake Eater | Soldiers | | |
| 2005 | God of War | Boat Captain | | |
| 2005 | Predator: Concrete Jungle | Additional voices | | |
| 2005 | Madagascar | King Julien, Polar Bear, Ostrich #2 | | |
| 2005 | Destroy All Humans! | Soldier #1, Scientist #2 | | |
| 2005 | The Incredible Hulk: Ultimate Destruction | Additional voices | | |
| 2005 | X-Men Legends II: Rise of Apocalypse | Grizzly | | |
| 2005 | The Suffering: Ties That Bind | Hejira | | |
| 2005 | The Matrix: Path of Neo | Link, Insectoid, Civilian | | |
| 2005 | Kingdom of Paradise | Shinbu | | |
| 2005 | Law & Order: Criminal Intent | Tim Bradshaw, Alex Chang, Stephen Finch | | |
| 2005 | Neopets: The Darkest Faerie | Gordos, Wondering Merchant | | |
| 2006 | The Outfit | Allied Soldier | | |
| 2006 | Metal Gear Solid 3: Subsistence | Soldier | | |
| 2006 | Over the Hedge | Possum #1, Rat #1, Chihuahua #1 | | |
| 2006 | Cars | Lightning McQueen, Additional voices | Replaced Owen Wilson as Lightning McQueen in PlayStation Portable version only. | |
| 2006 | Pirates of the Caribbean: The Legend of Jack Sparrow | Various voices | | |
| 2006 | Monster House | Reginald "Skull" Skulinski Replacing Jon Heder | | |
| 2006 | Scooby-Doo! Who's Watching Who? | Monty Caswell, Mace Middlemost, The Ghost Hunter Haunter, Ghost Clown | | |
| 2006 | Dirge of Cerberus: Final Fantasy VII | Additional voices | | |
| 2006 | Tony Hawk's Downhill Jam | Budd | | |
| 2006 | Final Fantasy XII | Basch fon Ronsenburg | | |
| 2006 | Avatar: The Last Airbender | Additional voices | | |
| 2006 | Destroy All Humans! 2 | Additional voices | | |
| 2006 | The Sopranos: Road to Respect | Additional voices | | |
| 2007 | God of War II | Boat Captain | | |
| 2007 | Power Rangers: Super Legends | Green Galaxy Ranger, Green Samurai Ranger | | |
| 2007 | Cars Mater-National Championship | Lightning McQueen | | |
| 2007 | F.E.A.R. Perseus Mandate | Lt. Steve Chen, additional voices | | |
| 2007 | SpongeBob's Atlantis SquarePantis | Additional voices | | |
| 2007 | Foster's Home for Imaginary Friends: Imagination Invaders | Bloo | | |
| 2008 | The Chronicles of Narnia: Prince Caspian | Additional voices | | |
| 2008 | Robert Ludlum's The Bourne Conspiracy | Additional voices | | |
| 2008 | Lost Odyssey | Kaim Argonar | | |
| 2008 | The Incredible Hulk | X-Ray, Army Soldier, Bi-Beast's Top Head | | |
| 2008 | Mercenaries 2: World in Flames | Universal Petroleum | | |
| 2008 | Lego Batman: The Videogame | Alfred Pennyworth, Commissioner Gordon | | |
| 2008 | Shrek's Carnival Craze | Prince Charming, Puppet Singers, Dwarf | | |
| 2008 | Call of Duty: World at War | US Soldier | | |
| 2008 | Kingdom Hearts Re:Chain of Memories | Marluxia | | |
| 2009 | Cartoon Network Universe: FusionFall | Bloo | | |
| 2009 | Warhammer 40,000: Dawn of War II | Various voices | Also Chaos Rising and Retribution | |
| 2009 | Resistance: Retribution | Maquis Fighter, British Commando, Cloven Screams | | |
| 2009 | Infamous | Male Pedestrian | | |
| 2009 | Prototype | Additional voices | | |
| 2009 | Cars Race-O-Rama | Lightning McQueen | | |
| 2009 | Ice Age: Dawn of the Dinosaurs | Additional voices | | |
| 2009 | Dragon Age: Origins | Additional voices | | |
| 2009 | Ghostbusters: The Video Game | Additional voices | Credited as Keith Fergusen | |
| 2009 | Batman: Arkham Asylum | Lunatic #2, Stephen Kellerman, TV Voice | | |
| 2009 | Dissidia Final Fantasy | Judge Gabranth | | |
| 2009 | Marvel: Ultimate Alliance 2 | Scorcher, Cable | | |
| 2009 | Kingdom Hearts 358/2 Days | Marluxia | Archival audio | |
| 2009 | Undead Knights | Romulus Blood | | |
| 2009 | James Cameron's Avatar: The Game | Dalton, Na'vi, RDA | | |
| 2010 | Quantum Theory | Syd | | |
| 2010 | Mass Effect 2 | Additional voices | Also the 2021 Legendary Edition of the game | |
| 2010 | BioShock 2 | Additional voices | | |
| 2010 | Command & Conquer 4: Tiberian Twilight | Additional voices | | |
| 2010 | Lost Planet 2 | Additional voices | | |
| 2010 | Mafia II | Additional voices | | |
| 2010 | Cars Toon: Mater's Tall Tales | Lightning McQueen | | |
| 2010 | Megamind: Ultimate Showdown | Megamind | Replacing Will Ferrell | |
| 2010 | Megamind: Mega Team Unite | Megamind | Replacing Will Ferrell | |
| 2011 | Driver: San Francisco | | | |
| 2011 | Cars 2 | Lightning McQueen | | |
| 2011 | Dragon Age II | Arvaarad, additional voices | | |
| 2011 | Dissidia 012 Final Fantasy | Judge Gabranth | | |
| 2011 | Cartoon Network: Punch Time Explosion | Bloo, Samurai Jack, Mandark | Taking over the voice roles from Phil LaMarr and Eddie Deezen respectively. | |
| 2011 | Infamous 2 | Militia, Ice Guys, Male Pedestrians | | |
| 2011 | Captain America: Super Soldier | Red Skull | | |
| 2011 | Nicktoons MLB | Danny Phantom | Taking over the voice role from David Kaufman. | |
| 2011 | Gears of War 3 | Stranded Crew #4 | | |
| 2011 | X-Men: Destiny | Cameron Hodge, additional voices | | |
| 2011 | Might & Magic Heroes VI | Uriel | | |
| 2011 | Saints Row: The Third | Additional voices | | |
| 2011 | Infinity Blade II | Additional voices | | |
| 2012 | Final Fantasy XIII-2 | Additional voices | | |
| 2012 | Gotham City Impostors | Additional voices | | |
| 2012 | Prototype 2 | Additional voices | | |
| 2012 | Ice Age: Continental Drift – Arctic Games | Manny | | |
| 2012 | Darksiders II | Kargon, Prince of Darkness | | |
| 2013 | God of War: Ascension | Boat Captain | | |
| 2013 | Deadpool | Mister Sinister | | |
| 2013 | Disney Infinity | Lightning McQueen | | |
| 2013 | Saints Row IV | Additional voices | | |
| 2013 | Kingdom Hearts HD 1.5 Remix | Marluxia | Archive footage | |
| 2013 | Skylanders: Swap Force | Additional voices | | |
| 2014 | Lightning Returns: Final Fantasy XIII | Additional voices | | |
| 2014 | The Lego Movie Videogame | Emmet Brickowski, Lord Business, Han Solo, Robot #2 | Replacing Chris Pratt and Will Ferrell | |
| 2014 | Destiny | Lord Saladin, City Civilian | | |
| 2014 | Disney Infinity 2.0 | Lightning McQueen | Archival audio | |
| 2014 | World of Warcraft: Warlords of Draenor | Voice Over Cast | | |
| 2014 | Kingdom Hearts HD 2.5 Remix | Marluxia | Archival audio | |
| 2015 | Adventure Time: Finn & Jake Investigations | Various voices | | |
| 2015 | Lego Jurassic World | Additional voices | | |
| 2015 | Batman: Arkham Knight | Additional voices | | |
| 2015 | Disney Infinity 3.0 | Additional voices, Lightning McQueen | Archival audio for Lightning McQueen | |
| 2016 | Overwatch | Reaper | | |
| 2016 | Titanfall 2 | Ronin | | |
| 2016 | Final Fantasy XV | Dave Auburnbrie, additional voices | | |
| 2017 | Destiny 2 | Lord Saladin, NPC Male, Male Civilian 3 | Also the 2022 The Witch Queen DLC | |
| 2018 | Them's Fightin' Herds | Fred/Fhtng | | |
| 2018 | Adventure Time: Pirates of the Enchiridion | Lumpy Space Princess, Flame Guard, Mushroom Person | | |
| 2018 | Fallout 76 | Isaac Hammond, Jeff Lane, Morris Stevens, additional voices | | |
| 2019 | Kingdom Hearts III | Marluxia | English dub | |
| 2019 | The Elder Scrolls: Blades | Lond | | |
| 2019 | Rage 2 | Vineland Wallrat, Gunbarrel Guard, Jersey, MBTV Worker, Chris Le Dong, Mapy Mundo, Goon Assault | | |
| 2019 | Vader Immortal: A Star Wars VR Series | Villup, Vylip | 2 episodes | |
| 2019 | Marvel Ultimate Alliance 3: The Black Order | Professor X | Rise of the Phoenix DLC | |
| 2019 | Dissidia Final Fantasy NT | Judge Gabranth | | |
| 2019 | Star Wars: The Old Republic: Onslaught | Additional voices | DLC Expansion Pack | |
| 2020 | Final Fantasy VII Remake | Additional voices | | |
| 2020 | Fallout 76: Wastelanders | David Thorpe | | |
| 2020 | The Walking Dead: Onslaught | Rick Grimes | | |
| 2020 | Call of Duty: Black Ops Cold War | Additional Cast | | |
| 2022 | Overwatch 2 | Reaper | | |
| 2023 | Teenage Mutant Ninja Turtles: Splintered Fate | Leatherhead | | |
| 2026 | God of War Sons of Sparta | Deckhand | | |
