= Talon Warburton =

American actor (born 1992)

- Born: August 31, 1992 (age 34); Newport Beach, California, U.S.
- Education: California Lutheran University
- Occupation: Actor
- Years active: 2013–present
- Spouse: Rachel Demeter (m. 2023)
- Children: 1
- Father: Patrick Warburton
- Relatives: Zach Shallcross (cousin)

Talon Warburton (born August 31, 1992) is an American actor.

== Early life ==
Talon Warburton was born in Newport Beach, California, on August 31, 1992, to actor Patrick Warburton and Cathy Jennings. He graduated from California Lutheran University with a bachelor's degree in business.

== Career ==
Warburton's first voice-acting role was in Guardians of the Galaxy, as the voice of Tryco, debuting during the show's third season in 2018.

He has since gone on to voice characters in animated television series and video games, including Talon in DreamWorks Dragons: Rescue Riders and Lord Nighty-Knight in the television series Megamind Rules! and the pilot Megamind vs. the Doom Syndicate.

In July 2024, Warburton made his first major video game debut in Honkai: Star Rail, replacing Adam Michael Gold as the voice of Argenti. All of Gold's previous lines were rerecorded by Warburton, with no explanation for the replacement being given--though speculation revolves around a lack of contractual AI protections.

He has appeared on-screen playing minor characters in live-action shows, including Man with a Plan and The Goldbergs. In 2022, he has starred alongside his father Patrick in the Los Angeles production of David Ives's stage play All in the Timing.

== Personal life ==
Warburton began dating Rachel Demeter in April 2018. They became engaged on December 24, 2021 after 3 years of dating. They married on June 12, 2023. Together they have one son, who was born in February 2025.

== Filmography ==
=== Film ===
Year	Title	Role	Notes
2020	Thank You, Come Again	Agent Watts	Short film
2023	Echo Base	Commander	
2024	Megamind vs. the Doom Syndicate	Lord Nighty-Knight (voice)	
2025	The Rose of Versailles	Alain de Soissons	Anime; Netflix dub
2025	Diary of a Wimpy Kid: The Last Straw	Narrator (voice)	Disney+ original

=== Television ===
Year	Title	Role	Notes
2018	Man with a Plan	Danny	Episode: "Everybody's a Winner"
2018–19	Guardians of the Galaxy	Tryco, Asgardian, Challenger (voice)	2 episodes
2022	The Goldbergs	Jed	Episode: "The Strangest Affair of All Time"
2022	DreamWorks Dragons: Rescue Riders	Talon (voice)	Episode: "Dragonguard"
2024	Megamind Rules!	Lord Nighty-Knight (voice)	Recurring cast
2024	Tokyo Override	Hugo (voice)	English version
2025	Ishura	Mele the Horizon's Roar (voice)	English version
2025–present	Iron Man and His Awesome Friends	Absorbing Man, Pedro the Pitcher (voice)	Recurring role
2025	Digimon Ghost Game	Sealsdramon, Toropiamon, ZeedMillenniumon (voices: English dub)	3 episodes
2026	Invincible	Young Nolan (voice)	Episode: "I'll Give You the Grand Tour"

=== Video games ===
Year	Title	Role	Notes
2020	Genshin Impact	Moseis	English version
2024	Final Fantasy VII Rebirth	Additional voices	English version
2024	Honkai: Star Rail	Argenti	English version, replaced Adam Gold beginning in Version 2.4
