= Megamind: Mega Team Unite =

2010 video game

- North American cover art
- Developer: THQ Studio Australia
- Publisher: THQ
- Programmer: Ben Wooller
- Artist: Leif Estes
- Writer: Mark Hoffmeier
- Composer: Daniel Sadowski
- Series: Megamind
- Platform: Wii
- Release: NA: November 2, 2010; EU: November 26, 2010
- Genre: Party
- Modes: Single-player, multiplayer

Megamind: Mega Team Unite is a 3D party video game based on the Megamind franchise, developed by THQ Studio Australia, and published by THQ. It launched on November 2, 2010 for the Wii to coincide with the film's release. Its critical reception was generally negative.

== Gameplay ==
The game is a beat-em up that supports up to 4 players. Players get to play as Megamind, Minion, Metro Man, and Tighten as a starting point for how the game will be. However, when beating each level, players get to pick characters that weren't shown in the final version of the film such as Destruction Worker, Psycho Delic, Conductor, Judge Sludge, and Hot Flash, who are known as the Doom Syndicate in the game. Each level consists of 9 rounds with over 50 minigames.

Like the previous game, Megamind: Ultimate Showdown, while most of the original film's cast were replaced with stand-in voice actors, such as Keith Ferguson, Drew Massey, and Rick Pasqualone replacing Will Ferrell, David Cross, and Brad Pitt as Megamind, Minion, and Metro Man respectively, Jonah Hill reprises his role as Hal Stewart / Tighten.

== Plot ==
After Megamind retires from his supervillainy career and becomes the new hero of Metro City (Note: As depicted at the end of Megamind (2010)), he decides to form his own super hero squad, The Mega Squad, consisting of his sidekick Minion, his former rival and Metro City's previous hero, Metro Man, and a reformed Tighten, the main villain of the film, to defend the city from the newly-founded Doom Syndicate, consisting of Destruction Worker, Psycho Delic, Hot Flash, Judge Sludge, and the Conductor.

During the game the more they defeat the villains, the more the villains join the Mega Squad. After defeating the Conductor, the last of the Doom Syndicate, chaos is averted and order has been prevailed. Megamind is victorious.

== Reception ==
Reception

Review scores
Publication	Score
Jeuxvideo.com	9/20
Official Nintendo Magazine	42/100

Lena of Jeuxvideo.com rated the game 9/20 points, calling the content rickety and the game forgettable. Nintendo Official Magazine UK rated it 42/100 and called its gameplay "utterly boring". Patrick G. of GamingXP rated the game 78/100, calling the levels nice but criticizing how little it resembled the film.
