= Megamind (soundtrack) =

2010 film soundtrack album

Megamind: Music from the Motion Picture

Soundtrack album by Hans Zimmer and Lorne Balfe
- Released: November 2, 2010
- Recorded: 2010
- Studios: Abbey Road Studios; Air Studios
- Genres: Classical, rock
- Length: 48:10
- Label: Lakeshore Records
- Producer: Skip Williamson

Hans Zimmer chronology
Inception (2010)	Megamind: Music from the Motion Picture (2010)	How Do You Know (2010)

Lorne Balfe chronology
Sherlock Holmes (2009)	Megamind (2010)	The Dilemma (2011)

Megamind: Music from the Motion Picture is a soundtrack to the 2010 film of the same name, released by Lakeshore Records and composed by Hans Zimmer and Lorne Balfe. It was released on November 2, 2010 in the United States and Canada. The soundtrack gathered mixed reviews from most music critics.

Kimberly Lynn Workman of Fandomania noted that the film is "interspersed with the original music are well-known tracks from famous artists. "Lovin' You" by Minnie Riperton is a song that originally was meant to convey the feeling of being in love. Over the years, as it's been used in soundtracks, it has also brought a humorous slant to the characters' relationships. I expect nothing less from the movie's use of it here. "Alone Again Naturally" by Gilbert O'Sullivan has always made me snap my fingers and you just know that the bittersweet feeling it creates will fully illustrate a scene to pull at our heartstrings. I have to admit that I've always had a soft spot for not only Elvis Presley, but the Junkie XL Remix of "A Little Less Conversation." I was very pleased that it was included on this soundtrack because the world is a happier place with a dose of Elvis. To end the famous tracks, we get "Bad to the Bone" by George Thorogood & the Destroyers. It's a self-proclamation that fits right in with this movie."

Richard Buxton of Tracksounds stated: "To assume that a score that deceives expectations and opts for a scheme different to that of the regular hero vs. villain tale is a failure would be wrong. Megamind may occasionally induce a desire to hear such conventions in full force, but Zimmer and Balfe have weaved a score that is engaging and consistently refreshing to listeners, and is a credit to the film it accompanies."

Jonathan Broxton of Movie Music UK wrote that "the score for Megamind is a great deal of fun, and will appeal tremendously to anyone with an affinity for John Powell's animated adventure scores such as Robots and Bolt, with which this score has a lot in common. It's also gratifying to see Lorne Balfe emerge into spotlight as a composer in his own right after spending years in the background manipulating Hans Zimmer's synthesizers. It will be interesting to see where he goes from here." Danny Graydon of Empire film magazine gave the score a positive review, stating that "DreamWorks' latest family comedy about a big-bonced super-villain sees Hans Zimmer (with long-time collaborator Lorne Balfe) revisit some of his less-appreciated work. Those who get bored with Zimmer's reliance on electronics in his blockbuster scores will find much to enjoy here: it's a fun, quirky orchestral effort mixing parodic moments (Giant Blue Head) with brassy fanfares (Stars and Tights) and pretty romance (Rejection in the Rain). It's not teeming with originality, but worth a listen to hear Zimmer leave his comfort zone."

== Track listing ==
All music is composed by Hans Zimmer and Lorne Balfe, except as noted.

No.	Title	Artist(s)	Length
1.	"Giant Blue Head"		4:28
2.	"Tightenville (Hal's Theme)"		2:15
3.	"Bad to the Bone"	George Thorogood & the Destroyers	4:48
4.	"Stars and Tights"		1:25
5.	"Crab Nuggets"		2:17
6.	"A Little Less Conversation (Junkie XL Remix)"	Elvis Presley	3:31
7.	"Mel-On-Cholly"		2:32
8.	"Ollo"		3:06
9.	"Roxanne's Theme"		2:36
10.	"Alone Again (Naturally)"	Gilbert O'Sullivan	3:37
11.	"Drama Queen"		1:47
12.	"Rejection in the Rain"		1:45
13.	"Lovin' You"	Minnie Riperton	3:23
14.	"Black Mamba"		1:13
15.	"Game Over"		3:21
16.	"I'm the Bad Guy"		2:37
17.	"Evil Lair"		3:29
Total length:			48:10

Other songs used in the film include:

- "Miss America" by Bernie Wayne
- "Back in Black" by AC/DC
- "Highway to Hell" by AC/DC
- "Crazy Train" by Ozzy Osbourne
- "Mr. Blue Sky" by Electric Light Orchestra
- "Welcome to the Jungle" by Guns N' Roses
- "Bad" by Michael Jackson
- "Come as You Are" by Nirvana is also referenced. Metro Man sings, "I have eyes that can see right through lead," to the melody of the aforementioned song.

Original Music By Hans Zimmer & Lorne Balfe

Additional Music Arrangements By Michael A. Levine, Junkie XL & Stephen Hilton

Orchestra Conducted By Gavin Greenaway
