= Megamind Rules! =

American animated streaming television series

- Genre: Superhero; Comedy
- Based on: Megamind by Alan Schoolcraft; Brent Simons
- Developed by: Alan Schoolcraft; Brent Simons
- Voices of: Keith Ferguson; Laura Post; Josh Brener; Maya Aoki Tuttle
- Theme music composer: Alex Seaver; Adam Lambert
- Composers: Matthew Janszen; Bryan Winslow
- No. of seasons: 1
- No. of episodes: 16

Production
- Executive producers: Eric Fogel; Alan Schoolcraft; Brent Simons
- Producer: Kelley Deer (episodes 4–16)
- Running time: 22 minutes
- Production company: DreamWorks Animation Television

Original release
- Network: Peacock
- Release: March 1 – June 20, 2024

Related
- Megamind vs. the Doom Syndicate

Megamind Rules! is an American animated superhero comedy television series produced by DreamWorks Animation Television and based on the 2010 animated film Megamind. It takes place after the events of the direct-to-streaming film Megamind vs. the Doom Syndicate which follows Megamind learning to become a hero to Metro City while being an online influencer. It premiered alongside the film on Peacock on March 1, 2024, and received mixed reviews from critics.

== Premise ==
Picking up after the events of Megamind vs. the Doom Syndicate (2024), the series features Megamind defending Metro City with the help of his friends, Ol' Chum, Keiko, and newly elected mayor, Roxanne.

== Cast ==
=== Main ===
- Keith Ferguson as Megamind, a blue, humanoid alien supervillain-turned-superhero with a large cranium. Ferguson replaces Will Ferrell from the original film, after previously voicing the character in the original film's tie-in video games.
- Laura Post as Roxanne Ritchi, the mayor of Metro City (formerly a news reporter) who is Megamind's love interest. She temporarily gains the powers of the Doom Syndicate when Machiavillain mind-controlled her to become evil. Post replaces Tina Fey from the original film.
- Josh Brener as Ol' Chum (formerly Minion), a talking alien fish who has been Megamind's best friend and sidekick since childhood. He changed his name after a cease-and-desist from a fast food chain called Mr. Minion's Meatsicles. Brener replaces David Cross from the original film.
- Maya Aoki Tuttle as Keiko Morita, Megamind's child fan, social media influencer, and Megamind's second sidekick.

=== Villains ===
- Adam Lambert as Machiavillain, Megamind's former mentor.
- Lucie Pohl as Rochelle, a cockroach who becomes anthropomorphic after being exposed to Ol' Chum's intelligence spray.
- Brooke Dillman as Carla Magucci / Destruction Worker, a construction-themed supervillain. The character was one of the many scrapped villains that were planned to be in the original Megamind film. Destruction Worker (who was originally designed as male) was instead used in the video games Megamind: Ultimate Showdown and Megamind: Mega Team Unite.

==== Go Fish Gang ====
- Todd Haberkorn as Big King Fish, the leader of the Go Fish Gang.
- Eric Murphy as Blue Mackerel, a member of the Go Fish Gang.
- Joey Rudman as Red Snapper, a member of the Go Fish Gang.

==== Doom Syndicate ====
- Emily Tunon as Lady Doppler, a storm-themed supervillain who can manipulate weather. She is Roxanne's former co-worker named Gail. She is shown to be calm when her powers are stolen.
- Scott Adsit as Pierre Pressure, a mime-themed supervillain who has the power of hypnosis and speaks with a French accent. He is shown to speak with an American accent when his powers are stolen.
- Talon Warburton as Lord Nighty-Knight (formerly Fright Knight), a knight-themed supervillain who can manipulate shadows. He is shown to be afraid of the dark when his powers are stolen.
- Chris Sullivan as Behemoth, a lava golem. He is shown to be human-sized when his powers are stolen.

=== Supporting ===
- Roger Craig Smith as Jody Smelt, the cowardly former mayor of Metro City. Smith replaces Stephen Kearin from the original film.
- Jeanine Mason as Christina Christo, Roxanne's assistant who previously worked for Jody Smelt.
- Max Mittelman as Dude Monkey, a monkey-themed social media influencer who attempts to overtake Megamind's internet popularity.
- Tony Hale as Mel / Mr. Donut, the owner of a rundown diner turned donut shop.
- Jeremy Jordan as Bennett Schlurg-Peterman, Keiko's school teacher and an old friend of Roxanne.
- Eric Fogel as Polly 227, a robotic parakeet Megamind built for Ol' Chum.
- Ross Marquand as Metro Man / Music Man, the former hero of Metro City who quit to begin a career in music. Marquand replaces Brad Pitt from the original film.
- Jenny Yokobori as Blanche Morita, Keiko's mother.
- Haley Joel Osment as Dan Donner / Hu-Mouse, a scientist and employee of Everything City who gained the features and abilities of mice from a lab incident.
- Natalia Del Riego as Terry Sasko / Supercool Power-Kid, a proclaimed rejected kid who is chosen by Machiavillain to have superpowers.

=== Guest ===
- John Lavelle as PAL-3000, a robot invented by Keiko who Megamind programs to become his best friend after he becomes jealous of Bennett.
- Jess Harnell as Izzy Iggy

== Episodes ==
=== Pilot (2024) ===
Title	Directed by	Written by	Storyboarded by	Original release date
"Megamind vs. the Doom Syndicate"	Eric Fogel	Alan Schoolcraft and Brent Simons	Dennis Crawford, Solomon Fong, Jason Horychun, Renee Howerton, Hadas Rosen, and Alejandra Wiechers	March 1, 2024

=== Season 1 (2024) ===
No.	Title	Directed by	Written by	Storyboarded by	Original release date
1	"Megamind vs. Dude Monkey"	Joel Dickie	JD Ryznar	Solomon Fong and Renee Howerton	March 1, 2024
Megamind's popularity is challenged when a new superhero called Dude Monkey appears.
2	"The Villainous Origin of Mr. Donut!"	Mike West	Alan Schoolcraft and Brent Simons	Steve Garcia and Dennis Crawford	March 1, 2024
Mr. Donut begins to turn villainous after he loses his memory.
3	"Roach Hard: With a Vengeance"	Mike West	Eric Fogel	Dennis Crawford and Steve Garcia	March 1, 2024
Chum accidentally causes a cockroach to become an anthropomorphic evil genius.
4	"MegaMayor"	Steve Garcia; Behzad Mansoori-Dara	Eric Acosta	Jason Horychun and Hadas Rosen	March 1, 2024
Megamind and Roxanne try to act like each other when they accidentally switch bodies.
5	"Extra Credit"	Steve Garcia	Annabel Seymour	Solomon Fong and Hadas Rosen	March 1, 2024
Jealous of an old friend of Roxanne's, Megamind reprograms Keiko's robot into a new friend for himself.
6	"Too Much Chum"	Joel Dickie	Eric Acosta	Shaan Khan, James Nguyen and David Wiebe	March 1, 2024
An overworked Chum creates a clone of himself, but things go awry when the clone starts making more clones.
7	"A Cake for Keiko"	Mike West	JD Ryznar	Dennis Crawford and Randy Young	March 1, 2024
On her birthday, Keiko goes undercover in the Doom Syndicate team to prove to Megamind that she can be a hero.
8	"Who Wants to Save a City?"	Joel Dickie	Alan Schoolcraft and Brent Simons	Shaan Khan, James Nguyen and David Wiebe	March 1, 2024
Megamind's former mentor, Machiavillain, returns.
9	"Hero for a Day"	Steve Garcia	Annabel Seymour	Solomon Fong and Hadas Rosen	June 20, 2024
With Metro City once again thinking that Megamind is a villain, he must make his way through town without being spotted; things become complicated when a plucky 7-year-old boy thinks he's the hero who can stop Megamind.
10	"Of Mice That Are Men"	Mike West	Eric Acosta	Dennis Crawford, Thalia Tomlinson, Ande Rose and Randy Young	June 20, 2024
In an effort to keep his finger on the pulse of Metro City, Megamind goes undercover as an ordinary sales clerk but soon learns there have been a series of robberies and disappearances in the store.
11	"Game Over"	Joel Dickie	Erica Peterson	Shaan Khan and David Wiebe	June 20, 2024
Machiavillain traps Megamind in a simulation designed to turn him evil again.
12	"Blue Prison"	Steve Garcia	JD Ryznar	Solomon Fong and Hadas Rosen	June 20, 2024
Megamind runs into his former nemesis Metro Man while trying to escape prison.
13	"The Art of Destruction"	Joel Dickie	Annabel Seymour	Shaan Khan and David Wiebe	June 20, 2024
Megamind swaps powers with Metro Man while fighting a new villain known as Destruction Worker.
14	"Mission: Machia-fest"	Mike West	Eric Acosta	Dennis Crawford and Thalia Tomlinson	June 20, 2024
Megamind, Chum and the rest of the team attempt to infiltrate a festival thrown by Machiavillain to expose him as a villain to the rest of the city.
15	"Villain City"	Mike West	Annabel Seymour	Dennis Crawford and Thalia Tomlinson	June 20, 2024
After Machiavillain mind-controls the citizens of Metro City, it's up to Megamind and Keiko to find a way to cure them all.
16	"Thrilling Conclusions!"	Steve Garcia	Alan Schoolcraft and Brent Simons	Solomon Fong and Hadas Rosen	June 20, 2024
Megamind faces the ultimate challenge when he must square off against a mind-controlled Roxanne.

== Production ==
On February 11, 2022, it was announced that Peacock had ordered a CG-animated series from DreamWorks Animation Television serving as a follow-up to the film, originally titled Megamind's Guide to Defending Your City. The series chronicles the new hero's quest to become a social media influencer and a true superhero. The original writers of the film, Alan Schoolcraft and Brent Simons, served as executive producers and showrunners, with Celebrity Deathmatch creator Eric Fogel also an executive producer. JD Ryznar served as an co-executive producer and story editor.

On August 5, 2022, Simons confirmed that the show's writing was completed, and production was moving forward. In January 2023, it was revealed that the series would be released in 2024. In February 2024, it was announced that the series, now titled Megamind Rules!, would be released on March 1, 2024. Keith Ferguson, Laura Post, Josh Brener, Maya Aoki Tuttle, Emily Tunon, Talon Warburton, Scott Adsit, Chris Sullivan, Tony Hale, Jeanine Mason and Adam Lambert were announced as part of the cast.

New episodes of the show began streaming on June 20, 2024.
