= Megamind vs. the Doom Syndicate =

2024 film by Eric Fogel

- Promotional release poster
- Genre: Superhero; Comedy
- Based on: Megamind by: Tom McGrath; Alan Schoolcraft; Brent Simons
- Developed by: Alan Schoolcraft; Brent Simons
- Written by: Alan Schoolcraft; Brent Simons
- Directed by: Eric Fogel
- Voices of: Keith Ferguson; Laura Post; Josh Brener; Maya Aoki Tuttle; Emily Tunon; Talon Warburton; Scott Adsit; Chris Sullivan; Tony Hale; Jeanine Mason; Todd Haberkorn; Eric Murphy; Joey Rudman; Adam Lambert
- Music by: Matthew Janszen; Bryan Winslow
- Country of origin: United States
- Original language: English

Production
- Executive producers: Eric Fogel; Alan Schoolcraft; Brent Simons
- Running time: 85 minutes
- Production company: DreamWorks Animation Television

Original release
- Network: Peacock
- Release: March 1, 2024

Megamind vs. the Doom Syndicate is a 2024 American animated superhero comedy film produced by DreamWorks Animation Television and directed by Eric Fogel. It is a sequel to the 2010 film, Megamind, in addition to serving as the pilot for the television series, Megamind Rules!, which premiered the same day. Starring Keith Ferguson, Laura Post, and Josh Brener, the film follows Megamind, now a superhero, as he protects Metro City from his former allies in the Doom Syndicate, a team of supervillains.

Megamind vs. the Doom Syndicate was released on Peacock on March 1, 2024, and received overwhelmingly negative reviews from critics.

== Plot ==
Two days after the events of the film, Megamind now assumes the role of Metro City's defender. He, along with Ol' Chum (formerly Minion), stops a criminal trio known as the Go-Fish gang from stealing a priceless fish. For his heroic efforts, Megamind is presented the key to the city. Chum, feeling left out and undervalued in his efforts, tells Megamind that he wants to be his sidekick. Upon being rejected, Chum claims that he will search for other opportunities, which Megamind allows.

The Doom Syndicate, a supervillain team consisting of Lady Doppler, Pierre Pressure, Behemoth, and Lord Nighty-Knight, which Megamind used to be part of, breaks out of prison to visit him, thinking that his hero role is part of an evil plan. They embark on a crime spree, eventually challenging Megamind to prove he is still evil by robbing a bank. Megamind struggles to do so, but is helped by Keiko Morita, his self-proclaimed biggest fan, who helps him stage a fake robbery. Meanwhile, Chum has taken up work at a run-down diner.

Keeping his old crew fooled, Megamind reveals an abandoned villainous plot he conducted of launching Metro City to the Moon using rockets planted underground. The Doom Syndicate prepares to launch them, but Megamind stalls them. They suspect he is up to something, and vow to either launch Metro City themselves or destroy it. Realizing that he cannot defeat the Syndicate alone, Megamind tracks Chum inside his remodeled diner and attempts to enlist his help. However, after realizing he might belong more at the shop than with him, Megamind regretfully lets Chum go.

Megamind finds himself overpowered by the Doom Syndicate after they learn of his facade. He hides in an alleyway, feeling defeated, but is confronted by Roxanne and Keiko, who remind him it is okay to ask for help from others. Chum also returns as Megamind tells him he is truly his sidekick. A rejuvenated Megamind, along with Chum and Roxanne, devise a plan to save the day and appoint Keiko as part of their crew. They make a quick stop at Everything City to gather supplies for their plan while the Doom Syndicate struggle to open the door to the control room.

Upon breaking in, Lady Doppler presses the button to initiate the launch. Megamind and Roxanne face off against the Doom Syndicate to buy time for Chum to stop the launch, but are unsuccessful. During the City's ascent, Chum terminates the launch, with Metro City subsequently falling at a dangerous rate. Megamind leads the Doom Syndicate to a construction site, where he, with the help of Roxanne and Keiko, defeats the villains one by one. The crew manages to safely redirect Metro City back to Earth. Roxanne is elected the new Mayor of Metro City, while Keiko launches a hero signal as Megamind feels accomplished in his new team.

In a mid-credits scene, the Doom Syndicate are locked back up in prison, where they are visited by Megamind's former mentor, Machiavillain.

== Cast ==
=== Main ===
- Keith Ferguson as Megamind, a blue, humanoid alien supervillain-turned-superhero with a large cranium. Ferguson replaces Will Ferrell from the original film, after previously voicing the character in the original film's tie-in video games.
- Laura Post as Roxanne Ritchi, a news reporter who is Megamind's love interest. Post replaces Tina Fey from the original film.
- Josh Brener as Ol' Chum (formerly Minion), a talking alien fish who has been Megamind's best friend and sidekick since childhood. He changed his name after a cease-and-desist from a fast food chain called Mr. Minion's Meatsicles. Brener replaces David Cross from the original film.
- Maya Aoki Tuttle as Keiko Morita, Megamind's good-hearted child fan and a social media influencer who's the president of the online Megamind Fan Club.

==== Go Fish Gang ====
- Todd Haberkorn as Big King Fish, the leader of the Go Fish Gang.
- Eric Murphy as Blue Mackerel, a member of the Go Fish Gang.
- Joey Rudman as Red Snapper, a member of the Go Fish Gang.

==== The Doom Syndicate ====
- Emily Tunon as Lady Doppler, a storm-themed supervillain who can manipulate weather.
- Scott Adsit as Pierre Pressure, a mime-themed supervillain who has the power of hypnosis.
- Talon Warburton as Lord Nighty-Knight (formerly Fright Knight), a knight-themed supervillain who can manipulate shadows.
- Chris Sullivan as Behemoth, a lava golem.

=== Supporting ===
- Roger Craig Smith as Jody Smelt, the cowardly mayor of Metro City. Smith replaces Stephen Kearin from the original film.
- Jeanine Mason as Christina Christo, Mayor Smelt’s assistant.
- Tony Hale as Mel/Mr. Donut, the owner of a rundown diner that Ol' Chum turns into a successful donut shop.
- Michael Beattie as Eccentric Eddie, a homeless man who has a cockroach named Thaddeus.
- Eric Fogel as Polly 227, a robot parakeet Megamind built for Ol' Chum.

Metro Man / Music Man and Hal Stewart / Tighten appear in non-speaking roles in the opening sequence via archival footage from the original film.

=== Villains ===
- Adam Lambert as Machiavillain, Megamind's former mentor.

== Production ==
=== Development ===
In April 2011, DreamWorks Animation CEO Jeffrey Katzenberg commented that the studio did not have plans to produce future movie-genre parodies like Megamind (2010), Monsters vs. Aliens (2009) and Shark Tale (2004), nor sequels to these, saying that these films "all shared an approach and tone and idea of parody, and did not travel well internationally. We don't have anything like that coming on our schedule now."

In February 2022, it was announced that Peacock had ordered DreamWorks Animation Television to produce a spin-off series titled Megamind’s Guide to Defending Your City. In August of that year, it was confirmed that the writing had concluded and that the show had entered production.

In February 2024, DreamWorks Animation Television revealed a trailer for Megamind vs. the Doom Syndicate, with Keith Ferguson, Laura Post, Josh Brener, Maya Aoki Tuttle, Emily Tunon, Talon Warburton, Scott Adsit, Chris Sullivan, Tony Hale, Jeanine Mason and Adam Lambert as part of the main cast. Ferguson replaced Will Ferrell as the voice of Megamind, Post replaced Tina Fey as the voice of Roxanne and Brener replaced David Cross as the voice of Minion. Ferguson had previously voiced Megamind for video games and commercials. Writers Alan Schoolcraft, Brent Simons and director Eric Fogel defended the recasting, with Simons stating "not only does he have that experience of speaking in Will's voice, he's such a talented voice actor that he's able to kind of take the baton from Will, and build on what Will created." Schoolcraft added, "Will Ferrell has only done the voice for, you know, 85 minutes whereas Keith has now done it for 10 hours." Fogel said that Ferguson, Post, Brener and Tuttle "all bring just a real pathos, and just bring these characters to life." In the film, Minion is renamed Ol' Chum. Fogel stated that this was done to avoid association with the Minions characters who debuted in the Illumination film Despicable Me, which was released the same year as the original Megamind film. Alongside Megamind vs. the Doom Syndicate, Peacock also revealed that the previously announced television series, retitled Megamind Rules!, would serve as a follow-up to the film and be released the same day.

The concept of the Doom Syndicate was originally from an early version of the original film, but they were scrapped from the movie and instead were reused for the 2010 tie-in video game Megamind: Ultimate Showdown. Although the group made their return in Megamind vs. the Doom Syndicate, the group members are different from the ones in the video game, as Behemoth and Lady Doppler are the only two characters who were originally from the early version of the first film seen in the book The Art of Megamind.

=== Animation ===
The animation was provided by 88 Pictures, with production services by Doberman Pictures.

== Release ==
Megamind vs. the Doom Syndicate began streaming on Peacock alongside the first eight episodes of Megamind Rules! on March 1, 2024.

== Reception ==
On the review aggregator Rotten Tomatoes, 8% of 12 reviews are positive.

In a two out of four-star rating for RogerEbert.com, Nell Minow states the film "is intermittently funny and briefly heartwarming, as though they ran the original through the washing machine a few times, and then faxed it. [...] Compared to the original or to more recent films like Boss Baby and The Bad Guys, it is slapdash and lightweight." Ryan Leston of IGN called the film "a lazy, 14-years-too-late cash-in on DreamWorks IP", giving a four out of ten rating, adding that it "sets up a riotous romp through superhero cliché, but simply fails to deliver". ScreenCrush listed it as the worst film of 2024.

Director Eric Fogel stated that he is proud of what the crew was able to accomplish on the film, which he said had a "minuscule" budget. (Note: This budget was also split for the television series Megamind Rules!)
