= Megamind =

2010 film by Tom McGrath

- Theatrical release poster
- Directed by: Tom McGrath
- Written by: Alan Schoolcraft; Brent Simons
- Produced by: Lara Breay; Denise Nolan Cascino
- Starring: Will Ferrell; Tina Fey; Jonah Hill; David Cross; Brad Pitt
- Edited by: Michael Andrews
- Music by: Hans Zimmer; Lorne Balfe
- Production companies: DreamWorks Animation; PDI/DreamWorks
- Distributed by: Paramount Pictures (Note: In July 2014, the film's distribution rights were purchased by DreamWorks Animation from Paramount Pictures and transferred to 20th Century Fox before reverting to Universal Pictures in 2018 following NBCUniversal's acquisition of DreamWorks Animation in 2016.)
- Release dates: October 28, 2010 (Russia); November 5, 2010 (United States)
- Running time: 96 minutes
- Country: United States
- Language: English
- Budget: $130 million
- Box office: $321.9 million

Megamind is a 2010 American animated superhero comedy film produced by DreamWorks Animation. Directed by Tom McGrath, the film features the voices of Will Ferrell, Tina Fey, Jonah Hill, David Cross, and Brad Pitt. It tells the story of Megamind (Ferrell), a highly intelligent extraterrestrial supervillain. After defeating his long-time nemesis Metro Man (Pitt), Megamind creates a new superhero (Hill) to fight, but must act to save the city when his creation becomes evil.

Megamind premiered in Russia on October 28, 2010, and was released in the United States on November 5 by Paramount Pictures. It received generally positive reviews from critics and grossed $322 million against a $130 million budget. In the years following its release, the film gained a cult following via a variety of Internet memes.

The film later spawned a franchise, including a trio of video games and a short film, Megamind: The Button of Doom, which was included in the film's home media releases. A sequel, Megamind vs. the Doom Syndicate and a follow-up television series, Megamind Rules!, premiered on Peacock in 2024.

== Plot ==
Supervillain Megamind and his opposite, superhero Metro Man, are extraterrestrials from different species who were sent to Earth as infants after a black hole destroyed their home planets. Both arrive in Metro City at the same time, but Metro Man grows up in a wealthy mansion while Megamind is raised in a prison. In school, Metro Man is popular with classmates, while Megamind faces constant bullying until he snaps, sparking a lifelong rivalry. Over the years, Megamind and his fish-like best friend and sidekick Minion repeatedly battle Metro Man for control of the city, always ending in defeat. During the grand opening of the Metro Man Museum, Megamind breaks out of prison, kidnaps reporter Roxanne Ritchi, and lures Metro Man to an abandoned observatory under the guise of rescuing her. There, Megamind blasts him with a sun-powered death ray; Metro Man claims the copper-lined roof weakens his powers, making escape impossible. Thrilled, Megamind takes over the city and launches a crime spree, but soon becomes bored and aimless without his nemesis to fight.

Megamind decides to destroy the Metro Man Museum to forget the hero, but discovers Roxanne is present; during his escape, he dehydrates the museum’s curator, Bernard, reducing him to a small cube. Using hologram technology to disguise himself as Bernard, Megamind converses with Roxanne, whose comments inspire him to use Metro Man’s DNA to create a new superhero adversary. After perfecting the formula, a confrontation in his lair with Roxanne leads to its accidental injection into her cameraman, Hal Stewart, who harbors feelings for her. Disguised as Hal’s “Space Dad,” Megamind trains him to become a superhero. Seeing this as an opportunity to win Roxanne’s affection, Hal adopts the name “Titan” (later mispronounced as “Tighten”). Meanwhile, Megamind begins dating Roxanne while posing as Bernard, causing a rift with Minion over his apparent lack of interest in further crimes. Roxanne rejects Tighten when he attempts to court her, and Tighten later sees her on a date with Megamind disguised as Bernard. After the dejected Tighten leaves, Megamind’s disguise fails, prompting Roxanne to reject him as well.

Megamind sets up a showdown with Tighten for the next day, but soon discovers Tighten is using his powers to go on a crime spree. When Tighten suggests teaming up, Megamind purposely exposes his disguises and schemes to provoke him into a fight. Furious, Tighten brutally beats him. Realizing Tighten has no interest in justice and wants him dead, Megamind traps him in a copper ball, but Tighten easily escapes. Seeking help from a hesitant Roxanne, the two head to Metro Man’s old hideout—the school they once attended—and find him alive. He had faked his weakness and death, tired of protecting Metro City, and now calls himself “Music Man” to follow his dream of being a musician. Though Megamind asks for his help, Music Man refuses, instead urging him to step up as the city’s new hero, reminding him that a hero will always rise to face evil.

Feeling defeated, Megamind willingly returns to prison, while Tighten wreaks havoc and kidnaps Roxanne when she tries to talk him down. In a televised message, Tighten holds her hostage and challenges Megamind to a fight. Regretting his attempt to kill Metro Man, a reformed Megamind escapes prison with Minion’s help and makes amends with him. Disguising himself as Metro Man through holograms, with Minion posing as Megamind, he tries to scare Tighten off and save Roxanne, but his speech gives him away, and Tighten hurls him into the stratosphere. Megamind dehydrates himself into a cube, lands safely in a fountain, then rehydrates beside Tighten and removes his DNA, turning him back into Hal. With Hal arrested, Megamind rekindles his romance with Roxanne, and the city hails him as their new hero. The museum is rebuilt in his honor, with a disguised Music Man secretly attending the grand re-opening.

== Voice cast ==
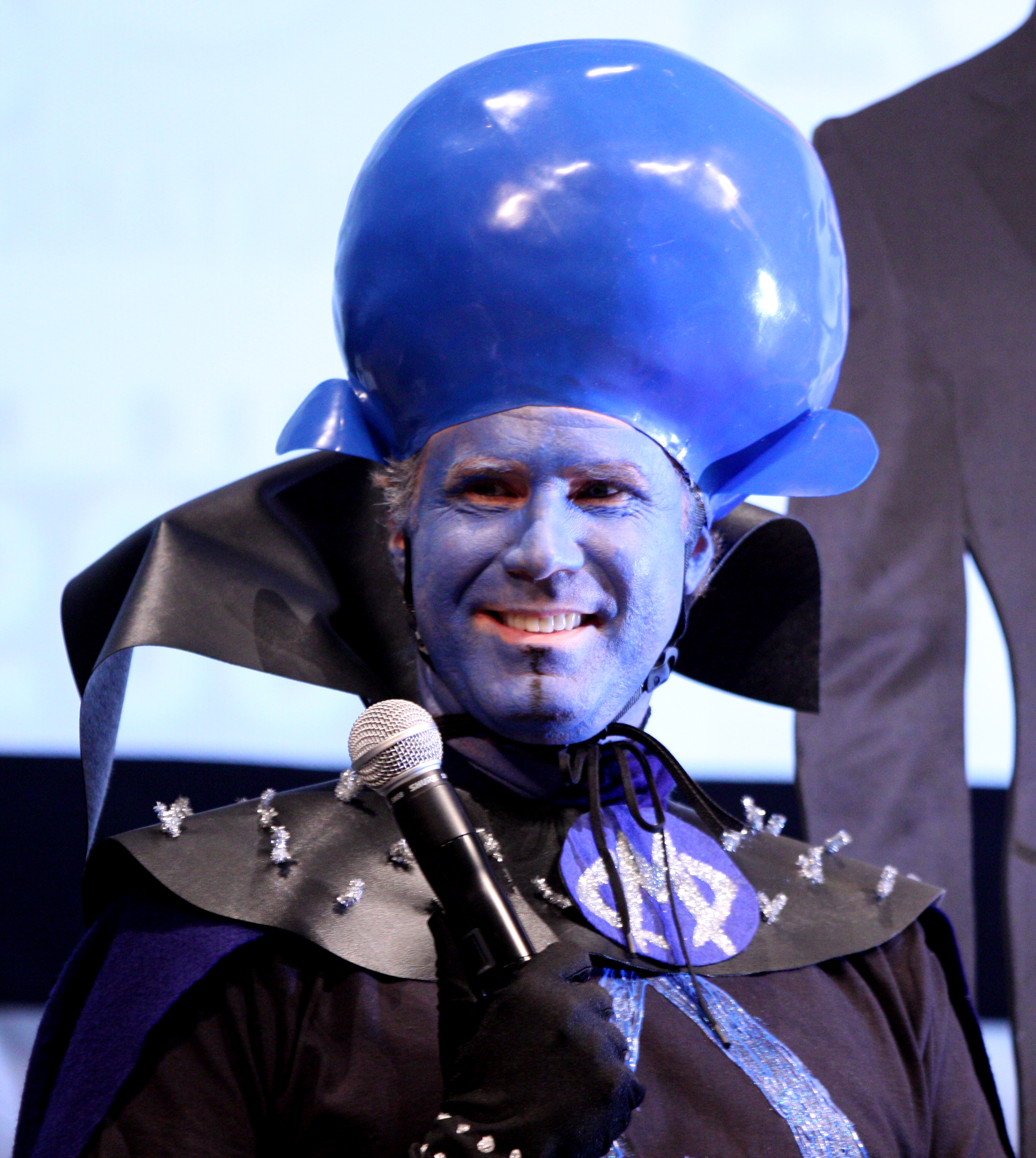
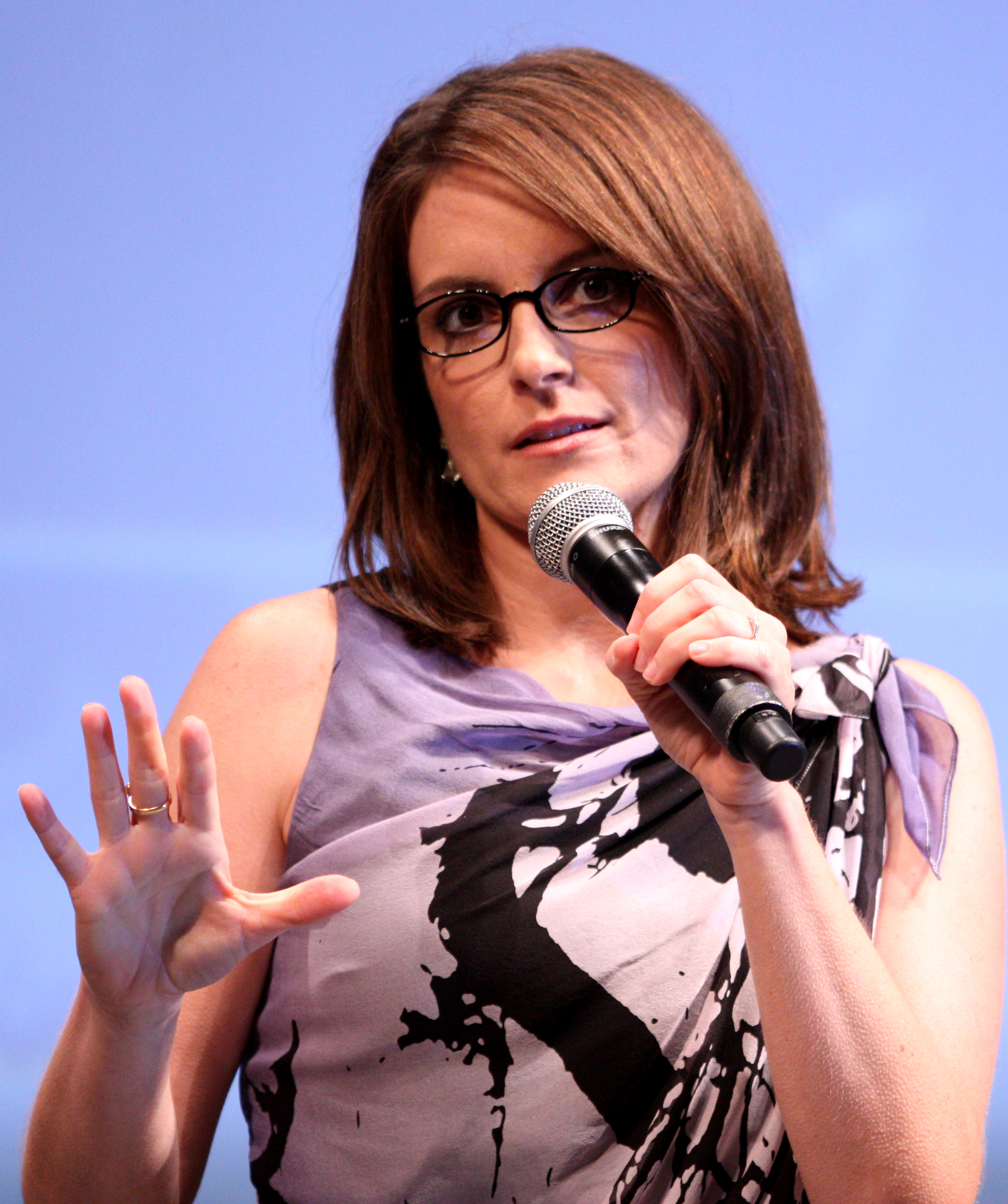
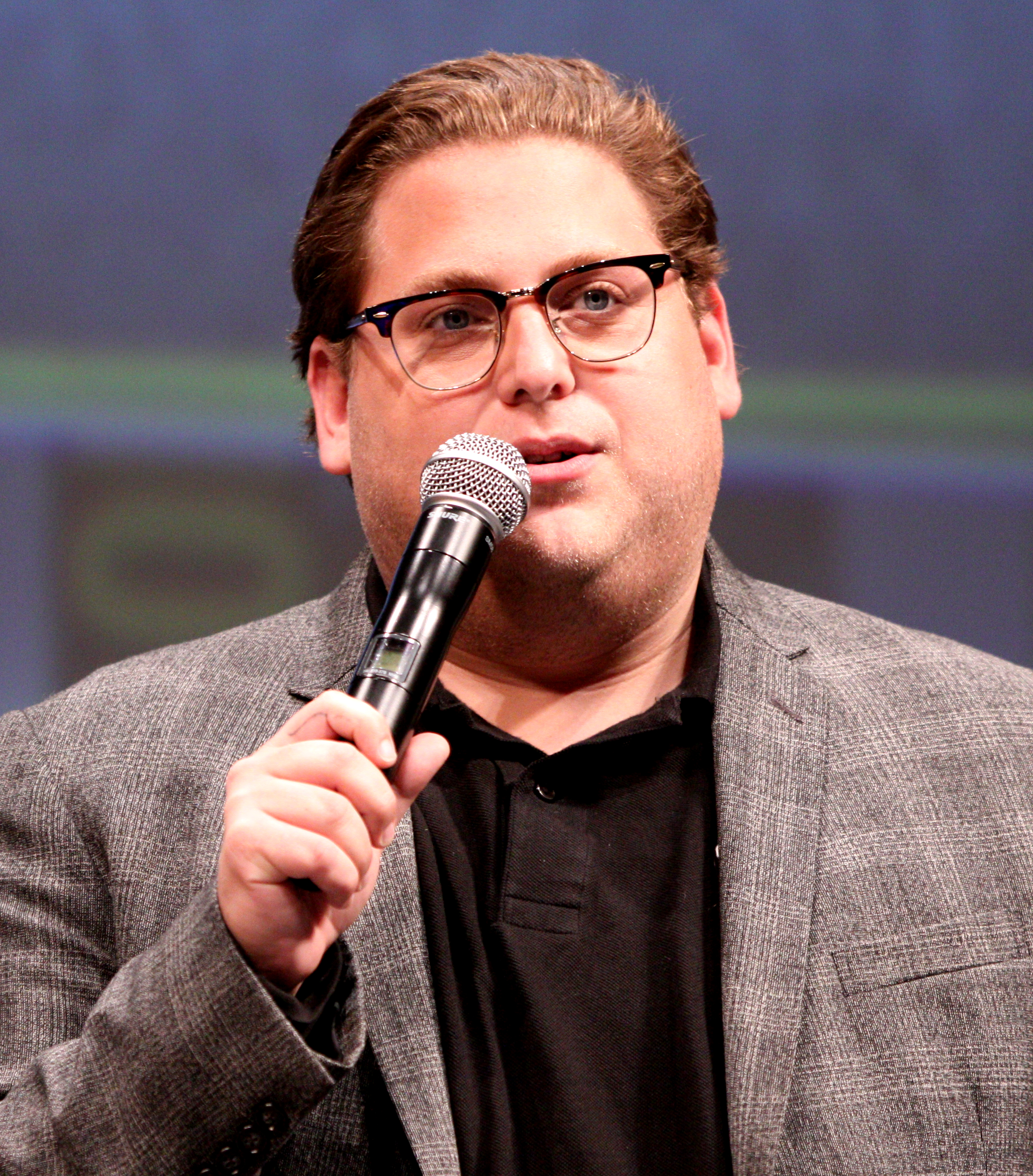
Left to right: Will Ferrell (dressed as Megamind), Tina Fey, and Jonah Hill at the 2010 San Diego Comic-Con
- Will Ferrell as Megamind, a blue-skinned and humanoid alien supervillain with a large skull. He is a parody of Lex Luthor and Brainiac. The home release commentary notes that his costume and showmanship are purposely evocative of Alice Cooper.
  - Ferrell also voices uncredited roles as Bernard and Hal's "Space Dad" in the second act of the movie and Minion in his disguise as Megamind in the film's climax. The "Space Dad" persona is a combined parody of Jor-El as played by Marlon Brando in the 1978 film Superman and Brando's voice as Vito Corleone in The Godfather.
- Tina Fey as Roxanne "Roxie" Ritchi, a strong-willed news reporter who becomes Megamind's love interest. She is a parody of Lois Lane.
- Brad Pitt as Metro Man, Megamind's former nemesis who leaves his superhero life to pursue a new career in music. He is a parody of Superman. The home release commentary notes that his costume and showmanship are purposely evocative of Elvis Presley.
- Jonah Hill as Hal Stewart / Tighten, Roxie's hapless, dimwitted cameraman who has an unrequited crush on her. Given powers by Megamind to become a superhero named "Tighten" (Megamind says "Titan" was trademarked), he instead becomes a supervillain. His name is in reference to Hal Jordan and John Stewart of the Green Lantern Corps.
- David Cross as Minion, a talking fish who has been Megamind's sidekick and best friend since childhood.
- J. K. Simmons as The Warden, the head of Metro City Prison.
- Ben Stiller as Bernard, a museum curator whom Megamind impersonates to win Roxie's heart.
- Christopher Knights as Prison Guard
- Tom McGrath as Lord Scott / Prison Guard
- Jack Blessing as Newscaster
- Justin Theroux and Jessica Schulte as Megamind's parents
- Rob Corddry as Random Citizen

== Production ==
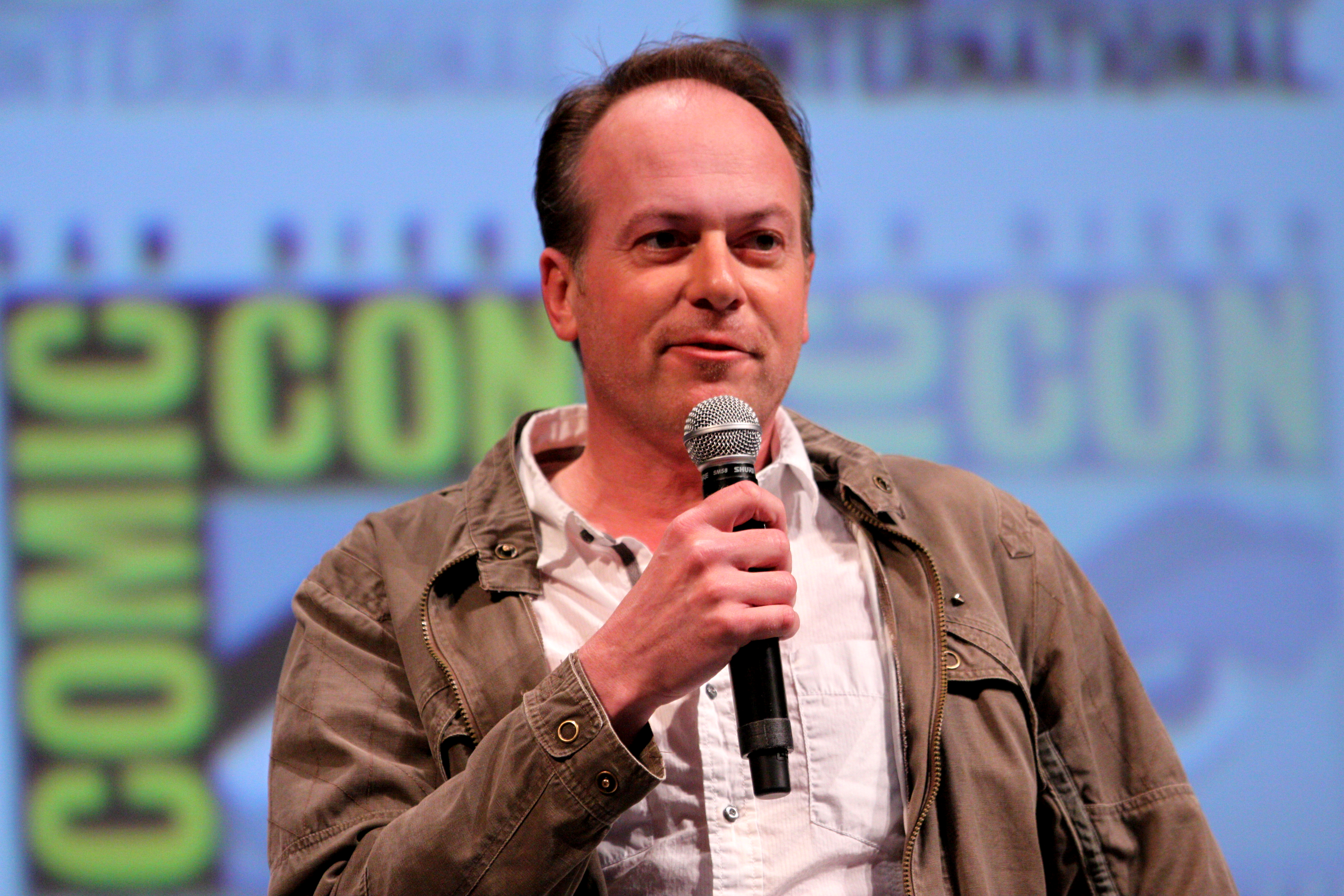
Director Tom McGrath promoting the film at the 2010 San Diego Comic-Con

The film was written by Alan J. Schoolcraft and Brent Simons. It was first titled Master Mind, and then Oobermind. It was originally suggested that Ben Stiller would be cast as Megamind, and later Robert Downey Jr. but Will Ferrell was ultimately given the role, due to "scheduling conflicts" for Downey, while Stiller was instead cast in a minor role as a curator named Bernard. Lara Breay and Denise Nolan Cascino were the film's producers, and Stiller and Stuart Cornfeld were the executive producers. Justin Theroux and Guillermo del Toro worked as creative consultants on the film. Del Toro came on board three weeks before the end of production, but went on to have a more substantial role in subsequent DreamWorks Animation films. The opening of the film, where Megamind is falling to his apparent death, was del Toro's idea. Del Toro also convinced them to cut 7 minutes of finished animation from the movie.

== Music ==
Megamind: Music from the Motion Picture is the soundtrack to the film, featuring a score composed by Hans Zimmer and Lorne Balfe, and released on November 2, 2010, by Lakeshore Records.

Guns N' Roses' "Welcome to the Jungle" was also used in the scene where Megamind and Tighten have their last battle.

== Release ==
=== Theatrical ===
Megamind premiered on October 28, 2010, in Russia, and was theatrically released in the United States on November 5, 2010. It was supposed to be released in Japan on March 12, 2011, but due to the earthquake and tsunami a day before, the Japanese release was cancelled until June 2018.

=== Marketing ===
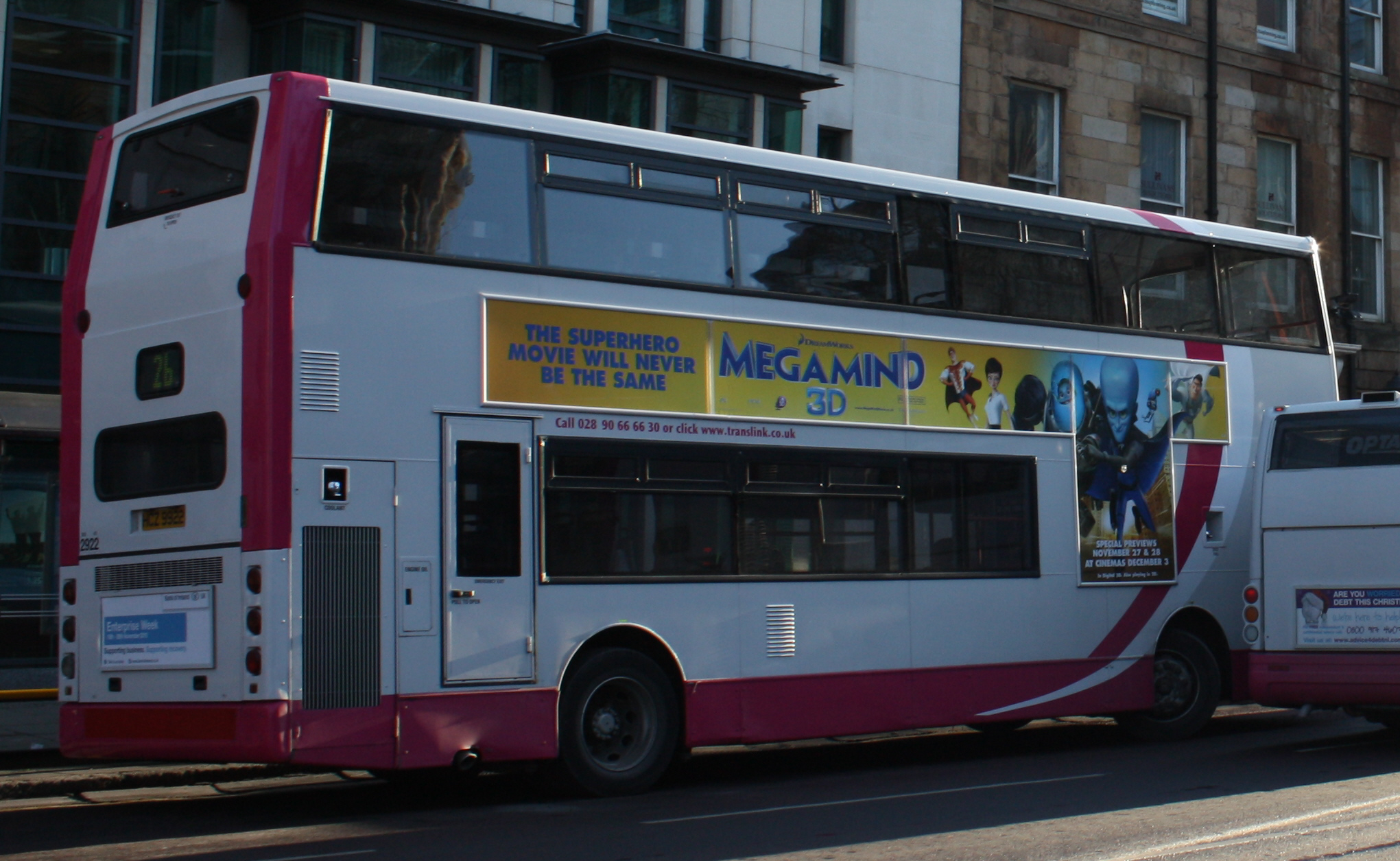
Metro bus promoting the film in Belfast

Megamind was promoted at the 2010 San Diego Comic-Con, with Tom McGrath, Tina Fey, Jonah Hill, and Will Ferrell, who was dressed as Megamind.

=== Home media ===
It was released on both Blu-ray Disc and DVD on February 25, 2011, accompanied with an all-new short titled Megamind: The Button of Doom. The Button of Doom also had its television premiere on Nickelodeon, which was aired on February 26, 2011. It was the seventh-best-selling DVD of 2011 with over 3 million units sold. The film made a total of $70.4 million in DVD and Blu-ray sales. As of November 2012, 5.6 million home entertainment units were sold worldwide.

The film was released on Blu-ray 3D in March 2011 exclusively as a part of Samsung 3D Starter Kits, and on September 11, 2011, exclusively at Best Buy stores. In 2014, the film's distribution rights were purchased by DreamWorks Animation from Paramount Pictures and transferred to 20th Century Fox; the rights are now owned by Universal Pictures, following NBCUniversal's 2016 acquisition of DreamWorks Animation.

== Reception ==
=== Box office ===
Megamind opened to $12.5 million on opening day, and earned $46 million over the three-day weekend, taking the No. 1 spot, averaging $11,668 from around 7,300 screens at 3,944 theaters. The opening was a bit higher than fellow DreamWorks Animation film How to Train Your Dragon, which earned $43.7 million back in March 2010. It was the fifth-highest opening for an animated feature in 2010. In its second weekend, it repeated at No. 1 and dropped 37% to $29.1 million for a $7,374 average from 3,949 theaters, and bringing its 10-day cumulative total to $88.8 million. On its third weekend, it fell 45% to $16 million and finished second to Harry Potter and the Deathly Hallows – Part 1, averaging $4,237 from 3,779 theaters. Over Thanksgiving weekend, it held well with just a 22% drop to $12.6 million and slid to third place behind Harry Potter and the Deathly Hallows – Part 1 and Tangled (it earned $17.3 million over the five-day Thanksgiving period). Following Thanksgiving, the film fell a sharp 61% in its fifth weekend to $4.9 million and finished in sixth place.

The film closed in theaters on February 24, 2011 (a day before it was released on DVD and Blu-ray), earning $148.4 million in North America, and $173.5 million in other countries, for a worldwide total of $321.9 million. It is the sixth-highest-grossing animated film from 2010 worldwide, behind Toy Story 3 ($1.063 billion), Shrek Forever After ($753 million), Tangled ($591 million), Despicable Me ($543 million), and How to Train Your Dragon ($494 million), the highest-grossing film worldwide in both Ferrell's (until 2014's The Lego Movie) and Fey's careers, as well as the fifth-highest-grossing computer-animated superhero film, behind Incredibles 2, The Incredibles, Big Hero 6 and Spider-Man: Into the Spider-Verse.

=== Critical response ===
On Rotten Tomatoes the film has an approval rating of 73% based on 178 reviews and an average rating of 6.7/10. The site's consensus states, "It regurgitates plot points from earlier animated efforts, and isn't quite as funny as it should be, but a top-shelf voice cast and strong visuals help make Megamind a pleasant, if unspectacular, diversion." On Metacritic the film has a weighted average score of 63 out of 100 based on reviews from 33 critics, indicating "generally favorable" reviews. Audiences polled by CinemaScore gave the film an average grade of "A−" on an A+ to F scale.

Roger Ebert of the Chicago Sun-Times gave the film three stars out of four, stating, "This set-up is bright and amusing, even if it does feel recycled from bits and pieces of such recent animated landmarks as The Incredibles with its superpowers and Despicable Me with its villain." Stephen Holden, of The New York Times, positively wrote in his review, "Visually Megamind is immaculately sleek and gracefully enhanced by 3-D." Entertainment Weekly reviewer Owen Gleiberman graded the film a B+ and wrote, "...too goofy-surreal to pack a lot of emotional punch, but it's antically light on its feet, with 3-D images that have a lustrous, gizmo-mad sci-fi clarity." Peter Travers of Rolling Stone commented, "What this raucous 3D animated fun house lacks in originality (think bastard child of The Incredibles and Despicable Me) it makes up for in visual and vocal wit." Betsy Sharkey of the Los Angeles Times wrote, "Just as Megamind struggles to find his center, at times, so does the film."

The main point of criticism was the film's perceived lack of originality. Michael Phillips of the Chicago Tribune wrote: "You have seen all this before". Justin Chang of Variety said: "Though enlivened by some moderately clever twists on the superhero-movie template, Megamind never shakes off a feeling of been-there-spoofed-that." Claudia Puig of USA Today asked: "Do we really need Megamind when Despicable Me is around?".

=== Accolades ===
Award	Category	Name	Result
38th Annie Awards	Animated Effects in an Animated Production	Krzysztof Rostek	Nominated
38th Annie Awards	Character Animation in a Feature Production	Mark Donald	Nominated
38th Annie Awards	Character Animation in a Feature Production	Anthony Hodgson	Nominated
38th Annie Awards	Character Design in a Feature Production	Timothy Lamb	Nominated
38th Annie Awards	Storyboarding in a Feature Production	Catherine Yuh Rader	Nominated
38th Annie Awards	Writing in a Feature Production	Alan Schoolcraft, Brent Simons	Nominated
Washington D.C. Area Film Critics Association Awards 2010	Best Animated Film		Nominated
2011 Kids' Choice Awards	Favorite Buttkicker	Will Ferrell	Nominated
The National Movie Awards	Best Animated Movie		Nominated
The Comedy Awards	Best Animated Comedy Movie		Nominated

== Video games ==
Several video game tie-ins published by THQ were released on November 2, 2010, to coincide with the film's release. An Xbox 360 and PlayStation 3 version is titled Megamind: Ultimate Showdown, while the Wii version is titled Megamind: Mega Team Unite and the PlayStation Portable and Nintendo DS versions are both titled Megamind: The Blue Defender.

== Megamind: The Button of Doom ==
Megamind: The Button of Doom is a 2011 animated short film released on DVD/Blu-ray with Megamind on February 25, 2011, directed by Simon J. Smith and stars Will Ferrell and David Cross with a story by the original writers of the film. Produced by DreamWorks, the short is set after the events of the film, showcasing Megamind's first day as Defender of Metro City.

=== Plot ===
Following the events of the feature film, Megamind and Minion have assumed the challenging role of Protectors of Metro City. They begin by selling off their old gadgets from their former evil lair, as Megamind does not think heroes should use devices associated with evil. All of the items are sold, except for the Death Ray, which Megamind reluctantly keeps. As for the De-Gun, Megamind's former favorite weapon, it gets sold to a boy named Damien, who accidentally uses it to dehydrate his mother into a cube. After the auction is over, Megamind reveals a supersuit he created that copies all of Metro Man's powers and that he intends to wear and defend the city.

Minion finds a stray box with a button on it that he was also unable to sell during the auction. Not remembering what the button does, Megamind pushes it, activating an AI program based on his former evil personality that transfers itself into a giant robot called the Mega-Megamind. After scanning the supersuit, the robot thinks that Megamind is Metro Man and starts attacking him. Megamind fights the Mega-Megamind with his new powers, but is unfamiliar with their use, which causes him to crash-land in his lair. Megamind and Minion hide in the Invisible Car, and Megamind fears they will have to stay there forever, as he programmed the AI to never stop until Metro Man was dead. Minion suggests that Megamind should stop trying to be Metro Man and fight the robot in his own way. He also reveals he secretly kept their giant Spider-Bot, having grown fond of it as a pet.

Megamind thanks Minion and plans to lure the Mega-Megamind to the abandoned observatory in which the real Metro Man faked his death. Megamind, riding the Spider-Bot, succeeds in luring the Mega-Megamind to the spot, but Minion cannot activate the Death Ray because its main controls were smashed by Megamind's suit when he crash-landed. Megamind has Minion test the contents of a box of old secondary remotes to find the one for the Death Ray. Minion does so, and activates several features in the lair and on the Spider-Bot in the process, allowing the Mega-Megamind to capture the Spider-Bot. Finally finding the correct remote, Minion blasts the giant robot with the ray just as Megamind uses the robot's own arm-mounted crossbow to launch himself and the Spider-Bot to safety.

Megamind and Minion subsequently recover their old gadgets and re-purpose them for good. Upon finding Damien and the De-Gun, they discover he has dehydrated the parents of several other children as well as his own, and he and the children are throwing a party to celebrate their new freedom. Megamind reclaims the De-Gun, and re-hydrates the parents with a glass of water, much to the children's dismay. Later, Megamind and Minion see a signal in the sky (a spoof of the Bat-Signal) and ride off in the Invisible Car as they are called to action.

=== Cast ===
- Will Ferrell as Megamind and Mega-Megamind
- David Cross as Minion, Megamind's assistant
- Michelle Belforte Hauser as Concerned Mother
- Jordan Alexander Hauser as Damien
- Kevin N. Bailey as Kevin
- Dante James Hauser as Nigel
- Declan James Swift as Peter
- Fintan Thomas Swift as Barney

=== Release ===
The short film was released on DVD and Blu-ray with Megamind on February 25, 2011. The Button of Doom also had its television premiere on Nickelodeon, which was aired a day after its home media release on February 26, and on Cartoon Network, which was aired on September 5, 2022.

== Sequel film and television series ==
On February 11, 2022, it was announced that Peacock had ordered a CG animated series from DreamWorks Animation Television serving as a follow up to the film, originally titled Megamind's Guide to Defending Your City. The series chronicles the new hero's quest to become a social media influencer and a true superhero. The original writers of the film, Alan Schoolcraft and Brent Simons, are signed on as executive producers with Celebrity Deathmatch creator Eric Fogel. JD Ryznar was co-executive producer and story editor.

On August 5, 2022, Simons confirmed that the show's writing was completed and production was moving forward. In January 2023, it was revealed that the series would be released in 2024. In February 2024, it was announced that a sequel film, titled Megamind vs. the Doom Syndicate, and the series, now titled Megamind Rules!, would be released on Peacock on March 1, 2024.
