= Megamind: Ultimate Showdown =

2010 video game

- North American cover art for Xbox 360
- Developers: THQ Studio Australia (PS3, Xbox 360); Tantalus (PSP, DS)
- Publisher: THQ
- Producer: Alex McNeilly
- Designers: Cain Martin; Clint Reid
- Programmers: Michael Petrou; Paul Seedy
- Artists: Michael Yeomans; Nick Kerber
- Writer: Mark L. Hoffmeier
- Composer: Daniel Sadowski
- Series: Megamind
- Platforms: PlayStation 3 Xbox 360; PlayStation Portable; Nintendo DS
- Release: NA: November 2, 2010; EU: November 26, 2010
- Genre: Action
- Modes: Single-player, multiplayer

Megamind: Ultimate Showdown is a 3D platformer video game based on the 2010 animated film Megamind, developed by THQ Studio Australia for console and Tantalus for handheld, published by THQ in association with DreamWorks Animation. It was released on November 2, 2010, for Xbox 360 and PlayStation 3, to coincide with the film's release. It was critically panned for its story and gameplay, as well as its low level of difficulty.

Another game known as Megamind: The Blue Defender was released on PSP and DS.

== Gameplay ==
The player has the ability to play as Megamind by using his De-Gun to vaporize enemies. For the console version, the game contains hidden loot and upgrades acquired by various amounts of B.I.N.K.E.Y. (Blue Ion Nano-Kinetic Energ-Y). If there is a second player, the player can play as a Brainbot that assists Megamind. For the handheld version, players get to level up their weapons and collect ammo from defeated enemies.

While most of the original film's cast were replaced with soundalikes, namely Keith Ferguson and Drew Massey replacing Will Ferrell and David Cross as Megamind and Minion respectively, Jonah Hill reprises his role as Hal Stewart / Tighten.

== Plot ==
After retiring from his supervillain career and becoming Metro City’s new hero (Note: As depicted at the end of Megamind (2010)), Megamind holds a press conference at City Hall when Minion calls in to report that the Doom Syndicate has broken into their lair and stolen both his DNA and that of former rival Metro Man. Determined to protect the city, Megamind patrols the streets, defeats the Destruction Worker, ventures into the sewers to take down Psycho Delic, and finally faces Hot Flash downtown. Once he gathers the components for his DNA tracker, he confronts the Syndicate’s leader, Tighten, at City Hall. With powers restored and enhanced by Megamind’s intelligence, blue skin, and Metro Man’s strength, Tighten proves a tougher opponent than before. However, Megamind outsmarts him by collapsing parts of the building to weaken him enough to use a serum that reverts Hal back to normal. He sends Hal and the rest of the Doom Syndicate back to jail, securing his victory.

== Reception ==
Reception

Aggregate score
Aggregator	Score
Metacritic	(PS3) 43/100 (Xbox 360) 33/100

Review scores
Publication	Score
Computer and Video Games	1.8/10
Official Xbox Magazine (US)	3/10
Common Sense Media	3/5

The game received an aggregate score on Metacritic of 43/100 on PlayStation 3 and 33/100 on Xbox 360, indicating "generally unfavorable reviews".

Official Xbox Magazine rated the Xbox 360 version of the game 3/10, calling the graphics the only part of the game that were not bad. Computer and Video Games rated the same version 1.8/10, calling the main game "exhausting inanity" and "the latest in a long line of identikit THQ kiddy platformers". Adam Wolfe of PlayStation LifeStyle rated the PS3 version 4/10, calling it a decent platformer but criticizing the gameplay as "repetitive" and the story "lackluster".
