= 1964 in animation =

Events in 1964 in animation.

== Events ==
=== January ===
- January 14: The first episode of Hanna-Barbera's The Magilla Gorilla Show airs.
- January 18: Gerry Chiniquy's Bugs Bunny cartoon Dumb Patrol is released, it marks the final appearance of Yosemite Sam in the Golden Age of American Animation. Porky Pig makes a cameo appearance in the beginning of the short.

=== February ===
- February 8: Robert McKimson's Speedy Gonzales and Sylvester cartoon A Message to Gracias premieres, produced by Warner Bros. Cartoons.
- February 25: Chuck Jones' Tom and Jerry cartoon The Cat Above and the Mouse Below premieres.

=== March ===
- March 24: Chuck Jones' Tom and Jerry cartoon Is There a Doctor in the Mouse? premieres.
- March 28:
  - The Incredible Mr. Limpet premieres.
  - Robert McKimson's Bugs Bunny and Tasmanian Devil cartoon Dr. Devil and Mr. Hare premieres, produced by Warner Bros. Cartoons. This was Taz's final appearance in the Golden Age of Animation.

=== April ===
- April 13: 36th Academy Awards: The Critic by Ernest Pintoff, starring Mel Brooks as narrator, wins the Academy Award for Best Animated Short.
- April 14: Chuck Jones' Tom and Jerry cartoon Much Ado About Mousing premieres.
- April 25: Friz Freleng's Speedy Gonzales and Sylvester cartoon Nuts and Volts premieres, this was the final Speedy Gonzales short to be produced by Warner Bros. Cartoons.

=== May ===
- May 12: Chuck Jones' Tom and Jerry cartoon Snowbody Loves Me premieres.
- May 16: Phil Monroe and Maurice Noble's Bugs Bunny and Daffy Duck cartoon The Iceman Ducketh premieres, produced by Warner Bros. Cartoons. This is the last time where Bugs & Daffy appear with each other in the Golden age of American animation.

=== June ===
- June 3: The first animated feature film with Yogi Bear, Hey There, It's Yogi Bear! premieres which is also the first animated film based on a TV cartoon program.
- June 6: Chuck Jones and Maurice Noble's Wile E. Coyote and Road Runner cartoon War and Pieces premieres, it was the final Wile E. Coyote and Road Runner short to be produced by Warner Bros. Cartoons & the final one to be directed by Chuck Jones until 1979's Freeze Frame (which aired as part of Bugs Bunny's Looney Christmas Tales).
- June 7: Shōnen Ninja Kaze no Fujimaru is first broadcast on NET.
- June 27: Gerry Chiniquy's Tweety and Sylvester cartoon Hawaiian Aye Aye premieres, produced by Warner Bros. Cartoons. Also starring Granny. This was Tweety's final appearance in the Golden Age of Animation.

=== July ===
- July 18: Robert McKimson's False Hare, the final Bugs Bunny theatrical short and the last original production completed by Warner Bros. Cartoons, is first released. Foghorn Leghorn makes a cameo at the end of the short, also marking his final appearance in the Golden Age of Animation.

=== August ===
- August 1: Hawley Pratt's Señorella and the Glass Huarache is released, it's the final cartoon released by the original Warner Bros. Cartoons studios.
- August 27: Robert Stevenson's Mary Poppins is first released, produced by the Walt Disney Company. It is primarily live-action but features some animated segments.

=== September ===
- September 17: The first episode of Bewitched airs, with an animated intro by Hanna-Barbera.
- September 18: The first episode of Hanna–Barbera's Jonny Quest airs.

=== October ===
- October 3: The first episode of Underdog airs.
- October 4: The first episode of Stingray airs.
- October 24: Friz Freleng and Hawley Pratt's Speedy Gonzales cartoon Pancho's Hideaway premieres, this was the first Speedy Gonzales short to be produced by DePatie–Freleng Enterprises. The cartoon features a Yosemite Sam lookalike named Pancho Vanilla.

=== December ===
- December 6: The stop-motion animated special Rudolph the Red-Nosed Reindeer, based on the song of the same name by Johnny Marks, premieres on NBC. It becomes a beloved Christmas tradition, still being shown on television decades later.
- December 8: Chuck Jones' Tom and Jerry cartoon The Unshrinkable Jerry Mouse premieres.
- December 18:
  - Karel Zeman's A Jester's Tale premieres.
  - Friz Freleng and David DePatie's The Pink Phink premieres in theaters which marks the beginning of the Pink Panther series of shorts.
- December 26: Friz Freleng and Hawley Pratt's Speedy Gonzales and Sylvester cartoon Road to Andalay premieres, produced by DePatie–Freleng Enterprises.

=== Specific date unknown ===
- Animafilm is founded.
- Ivan Ivanov-Vano and Vladimir Danilevich's Left-Hander is released.
- Jan Švankmajer's first animated short The Last Trick is released.

== Films released ==
- February - The Heroic Sisters from the Grassland (China)
- March 28 - The Incredible Mr. Limpet (United States)
- April 28:
  - Of Stars and Men (United States)
  - The Big Wick (Soviet Union)
- June 3 - Hey There, It's Yogi Bear! (United States)
- July 21 - Shounen Ninja Kaze no Fujimaru: Nazo no Arabiya Ningyou (Japan)
- July 22 - Lefty (Soviet Union)
- August 27:
  - Attention! The Magician is in the City! (Soviet Union)
  - Mary Poppins (United States)
- Specific date unknown:
  - Havoc in Heaven (China)
  - Is There Intelligent Life on Earth? (United Kingdom)

== Television series ==
- January 14 - Punkin' Puss & Mushmouse, Ricochet Rabbit & Droop-a-Long, and Magilla Gorilla debut in syndication.
- April 3 - Gusztáv debuts on Magyar Televízió.
- June 7 - Shonen Ninja Kaze no Fujimaru debuts on NET (now TV Asahi).
- August 3 - Big X debuts on TBS.
- September 12:
  - Hoppity Hooper debuts on ABC.
  - The World of Commander McBragg debuts on CBS.
- September 16 - Breezly and Sneezly, Peter Potamus and his Magic Flying Balloon, and Yippee, Yappee and Yahooey debut in syndication and on ABC.
- September 18 - Jonny Quest debuts on ABC.
- September 20 - The Porky Pig Show debuts on ABC .
- September 26: Linus the Lionhearted, Sugar Bear, Loveable Truly, Rory Raccoon, and So-Hi debut on CBS and ABC.
- October 3 - Underdog debuts on NBC and CBS.
- Specific date unknown:
  - Doc Potts debuts on Syncro-Vox.
  - The Big World of Little Adam debuts in syndication.
  - The Magic Roundabout debuts on ORTF and BBC.
  - The Enchanted Pencil premieres, starting with Na podwórzu (Polish for In the Yard)

== Television specials ==
- February 9 - Return to Oz debuts on NBC.
- December 6 - Rudolph the Red-Nosed Reindeer debuts on NBC.

== Births ==
=== January ===
- January 7: Nicolas Cage, American actor (voice of Zoc in The Ant Bully, Dr. Tenma in Astro Boy, Grug in The Croods franchise, Superman in Teen Titans Go! To the Movies, Spider-Man Noir in Spider-Man: Into the Spider-Verse).
- January 10: Osamu Kobayashi, Japanese animator, animation director and illustrator (Ani*Kuri15, Naruto, Grandia), (d. 2021).
- January 17: Michelle Obama, American attorney, author, producer (Waffles + Mochi, Ada Twist, Scientist, We the People) and first lady of the United States from 2009 to 2017 (voiced herself in the Doc McStuffins episode "Doc McStuffins Goes to Washington").
- January 18: Jane Horrocks, British actress (voice of Babs in Chicken Run and Chicken Run: Dawn of the Nugget, The Black Widow/Mrs. Plum in Corpse Bride, Lead Elf in Arthur Christmas, Fairy Mary in the Disney Fairies franchise, Eliza in the Phineas and Ferb episode "My Fair Goalie", the title character in Little Princess).

=== February ===
- February 12: Raphael Sbarge, American actor (voice of Tom Piper in Babes in Toyland, Deadman in the Justice League Unlimited episode "Dead Reckoning", Professor Zei in the Avatar: The Last Airbender episode "The Library").
- February 13: Dominic Polcino, American animator, storyboard artist (Film Roman, The Cleveland Show, Family Guy), art director (HarmonQuest), sheet timer (Rugrats), writer (The Twisted Tales of Felix the Cat) and director (Film Roman, Rick and Morty, Animals, HarmonQuest, The Freak Brothers, Beavis and Butt-Head Do the Universe).
- February 18: Matt Dillon, American actor (voice of Trey in Rock Dog, Louie in The Simpsons episode "Midnight Towboy").
- February 20: French Stewart, American actor and comedian (voice of Icarus in Hercules, Bob Alman in God, the Devil and Bob, Oble in Bartok the Magnificent, Gaston in the Phineas and Ferb episode "Run Away Runway").
- February 23: Vincent Chalvon-Demersay, French producer (Marathon Media).

=== March ===
- March 3: Teddy Newton, American animator and voice actor (Pixar, The Lego Movie 2: The Second Part, Smallfoot, Looney Tunes: Back in Action, Osmosis Jones, Histeria!, The Iron Giant).
- March 7:
  - Wanda Sykes, American actress, comedienne and writer (voice of Sister Moon in The Adventures of Brer Rabbit, Stella in Over the Hedge, Bessy in Barnyard and Back at the Barnyard, Innoko in Brother Bear 2, Chloe in Rio, Granny in the Ice Age franchise, Shirley B. Awesome in Penn Zero: Part-Time Hero, Gregoria in Vampirina, Wage in UglyDolls, Tsaritsa/Queen of Fables in Harley Quinn, Nuritza in Tig n' Seek, Deb in Q-Force, the Witch in the Bubble Guppies episode "Bubble Puppy's Fin-tastic Fairytale Adventure", Bev in the Futurama episode "The Bots and the Bees", School Therapist in The Simpsons episode "What Animated Women Want", Sofa Queen in the Bob's Burgers episode "Sacred Couch", Thea in the Doc McStuffins episode "The Emergency Plan", Mary-Beth in the BoJack Horseman episode "INT. SUB", Mona the Mayor in The Bravest Knight episode "Cedric & the Pixies", Ethel in the Summer Camp Island episode "The Great Elf Invention Convention", Harriet Tubman's Ghost in the Big Mouth episode "Duke").
  - Andy Ezrin, American composer (Courage the Cowardly Dog, Arthur's Missing Pal, Space Racers).
- March 8: Bob Bergen, American actor (voice of Tim in Sabrina: The Animated Series, Lama Su in the Star Wars franchise, Winter Soldier in the Avengers Assemble episode "Ghosts of the Past", Scoutmaster in the OK K.O.! Let's Be Heroes episode "Sidekick Scouts", continued voice of Porky Pig and Tweety Bird).
- March 13: Keiko Nobumoto, Japanese screenwriter (Cowboy Bebop, Samurai Champloo, Wolf's Rain, Tokyo Godfathers), (d. 2021).
- March 15: Leah Ryan, American television writer (Arthur), (d. 2008).
- March 16:
  - Gore Verbinski, American film director, screenwriter, producer and musician (Rango).
  - Victor Wilson, American television writer (Nickelodeon Animation Studio), producer (The Adventures of Jimmy Neutron, Boy Genius) and actor (voice of Phuepal in Aaahh!!! Real Monsters, Bing in The Angry Beavers, Announcer in Rocket Power, Mr. Ward in As Told by Ginger), (d. 2015).
- March 18: Michael Camarillo, American animator (Bebe's Kids, The Swan Princess, Quest for Camelot, The Road to El Dorado, Spirit: Stallion of the Cimarron, The Powerpuff Girls Movie), background artist (The Simpsons) and prop designer (Foster's Home for Imaginary Friends, Sym-Bionic Titan), (d. 2021).
- March 20: Melanie Kohn, American former child actress (voice of Lucy Van Pelt in It's a Mystery, Charlie Brown, It's the Easter Beagle, Charlie Brown, Be My Valentine, Charlie Brown, You're a Good Sport, Charlie Brown and Race for Your Life, Charlie Brown).
- March 30: Ian Ziering, American actor (voice of Vinnie in Biker Mice from Mars, Gludge in Aaahh!!! Real Monsters, Wildwing Flashblade in Mighty Ducks: The Animated Series, Harry Osborn in Spider-Man: The New Animated Series, Dr. Nick Tatopoulos in Godzilla: The Series, Mason Forrest in the Batman Beyond episode "The Winning Edge", Chase Huffington in the Drawn Together episode "Drawn Together Babies").

=== April ===
- April 4:
  - Anthony Clark, American actor (voice of Tony in the Dr. Katz, Professional Therapist episode "Family Car") and screenwriter (Dr. Katz, Professional Therapist), (d. 2026).
  - David Cross, American actor and comedian (voice of Master Crane in the Kung Fu Panda franchise, Tanner Rice in Next Gen, Minion in Megamind, Giddy in Battle for Terra, Prince Nebulon in the Rick and Morty episode "M. Night Shaym-Aliens!", himself in Night of the Living Doo, and Junior Bloomsberry in Curious George).
  - Robbie Rist, American actor (portrayed and voiced Whiz in Kidd Video, voice of Choji Akimichi in Naruto, Stuffy in Doc McStuffins, Mondo Gecko in Teenage Mutant Ninja Turtles, Star in Balto, Brian Daly in the Batman: The Animated Series episode "Baby-Doll", Swifty in the Sonic Boom episode "Blue with Envy").
- April 8: Biz Markie, American rapper, DJ and record producer (portrayed himself in the "Biz's Beat" segment of Yo Gabba Gabba!, voice of Beatbox Baggins, Odie's Security Guard and Elf in Mad, Tiny Timmy Scratch It in the Randy Cunningham: 9th Grade Ninja episode "Hip Hopocalypse Now", Snorlock in the Adventure Time episode "Slow Love", the title character in the SpongeBob SquarePants episode "Kenny the Cat", performed the song "That's The Way (I Like It)" in Space Jam), (d. 2021).
- April 13: Caroline Rhea, Canadian actress and stand-up comedian (voice of Linda Flynn-Fletcher in Phineas and Ferb, Caroline in the Dr. Katz, Professional Therapist, episode "Big Fat Slug", Spidey in the Happily Ever After: Fairy Tales for Every Child episode "The Steadfast Tin Soldier", Mrs. Konquist in the Fillmore! episode "Nappers Never Sleep").
- April 20:
  - Andy Serkis, English actor, director and producer (voice of Spike in Flushed Away, Charles in Animals United, General Elf in Arthur Christmas, Cleanie in The Simpsons episode "Dude, Where's My Ranch?", Kertasnikir in the Hilda episode "The Yule Lads", Ulysses Klaue in the What If...? episode "What If... Killmonger Rescued Tony Stark?").
  - Crispin Glover, American actor (voice of 6 in 9, Fifi in the Open Season franchise).
- April 24:
  - Cedric the Entertainer, American actor and comedian (voice of Leadbottom in Planes and Planes: Fire & Rescue, Maurice in the Madagascar franchise, Carl in Ice Age, Bobby Proud in The Proud Family and The Proud Family: Louder and Prouder).
  - Djimon Hounsou, American actor (voice of Drago Bludvist in How to Train Your Dragon 2, Black Panther in Black Panther, Sumo in Paws of Fury: The Legend of Hank, Korath the Pursuer in the What If...? episode "What If... T'Challa Became a Star-Lord?").
- April 25: Hank Azaria, American actor, comedian and producer (portrayed Gargamel in The Smurfs and The Smurfs 2, voice of Moe Szyslak, Chief Wiggum, Comic Book Guy, Superintendent Chalmers, Snake Jailbird, Apu Nahasapeemapetilon and other various characters in The Simpsons, Venom in Spider-Man, Bartok in Anastasia and Bartok the Magnificent, Eric Feeble in Stressed Eric, Carlos and Phil in Hop, The Mighty Sven in Happy Feet Two, Gargamel in The Smurfs: A Christmas Carol and The Smurfs: The Legend of Smurfy Hollow, Reginald Barrington, Nigel Harpington and Police Superintendent Chalmers in Family Guy, Bud Buckwald in Bordertown, Shelfish Sheldon in Mack & Moxy, Harold Zoid in the Futurama episode "That's Lobstertainment!").
- April 30:
  - Lauren MacMullan, American animator (The Critic), storyboard artist (Film Roman, Avatar: The Last Airbender, Walt Disney Animation Studios), character designer (Mission Hill), sheet timer (The Critic, The Simpsons), writer (Avatar: The Last Airbender, Get a Horse!) and director (Film Roman, Avatar: The Last Airbender, Get a Horse!, Disenchantment).
  - Misa Watanabe, Japanese actress (voice of Nefertari Vivi in One Piece, Ursula in Dinosaur King, Northa in Fresh Pretty Cure!, and Queen Beryl in Sailor Moon Crystal, dub voice of Mirage in The Incredibles and Veronica Vreeland in Batman: The Animated Series).

==== Specific date unknown ====
- Thilo Kuther, German film producer (founder of VFX company Pixomondo), (d. 2022).

=== May ===
- May 5:
  - Don Payne, American television writer and producer (The Simpsons), (d. 2013).
  - Minami Takayama, Japanese actress (voice of Conan Edogawa in Case Closed, Kiki and Ursula in Kiki's Delivery Service, Nabiki Tendo in Ranma ½, Hao Asakura in Shaman King, Hajime Hinata/Izuru Kamukura in the Danganronpa franchise, Envy in Fullmetal Alchemist: Brotherhood).
- May 6: Dana Hill, American actress (voice of Scrappy in Mighty Mouse: The New Adventures, Buddy in Adventures of the Gummi Bears, Tank Muddlefoot in Darkwing Duck, Max in Goof Troop, Jerry in Tom and Jerry: The Movie, Charles Duckman in Duckman), (d. 1996).
- May 8: Melissa Gilbert, American actress (voice of Clara in Nutcracker Fantasy, Barbara Gordon in Batman: The Animated Series).
- May 13: Stephen Colbert, American actor, comedian, and television host (voice of Phil Ken Sebben in Harvey Birdman, Attorney at Law, President Hathaway in Monsters vs. Aliens, Paul Peterson in Mr. Peabody & Sherman, Dr. Dandiker in the American Dad! episode "All About Steve", Colby Krause in The Simpsons episode "He Loves to Fly and He D'ohs", Zeep Xanflorp in the Rick and Morty episode "The Ricks Must Be Crazy", original voice of Professor Richard Impossible in The Venture Bros.).
- May 19: Takahiro Kimura, Japanese animator (City Hunter, Idol Densetsu Eriko, Mobile Suit Victory Gundam) and character designer (Code Geass, Code Geass: Lelouch of the Re;surrection, The King of Braves GaoGaiGar, Betterman, Mobile Suit Gundam Hathaway), (d. 2023).
- May 25: Ray Stevenson, Irish actor (voice of Gar Saxon in the Star Wars franchise, Punisher in The Super Hero Squad Show episode "Night at the Sanctorum!"), (d. 2023).
- May 26: Lenny Kravitz, American singer and actor (voice of Newborn Baby in The Rugrats Movie, himself in The Simpsons episode "How I Spent My Strummer Vacation").
- May 27: Adam Carolla, American radio personality, actor, comedian and podcaster (voice of Death in Family Guy, Commander Nebula in Buzz Lightyear of Star Command, Spanky Ham in Drawn Together, One-Eyed Jackson in Kick Buttowski: Suburban Daredevil, Wynnchel in Wreck-It Ralph and Ralph Breaks the Internet, himself in The Goode Family episodes "Pleatherheads" and "Graffiti in Greenville").
- May 28: Christa Miller, American actress and model (voice of Cleopatra in Clone High).

=== June ===
- June 10:
  - Jimmy Chamberlin, American drummer, record producer and member of The Smashing Pumpkins (voiced himself in The Simpsons episode "Homerpalooza").
  - Kate Flannery, American actress (voice of Carol in OK K.O.! Let's Be Heroes, Barbara Miller in Steven Universe).
- June 15: Courteney Cox, American actress, director and producer (voice of Daisy in Barnyard, Emerald Salt Pork in the Happily Ever After: Fairy Tales for Every Child episode "The Three Little Pigs").
- June 17: Chuck Klein, American animator, storyboard artist (Klasky Csupo, Disney Television Animation, Dilbert, Nickelodeon Animation Studio, Cartoon Network Studios, Mickey, Donald, Goofy: The Three Musketeers, Family Guy, The Amazing World of Gumball, Smallfoot, Elliott from Earth, The Snoopy Show), writer (SpongeBob SquarePants, My Life as a Teenage Robot, Whatever Happened to... Robot Jones?, Foster's Home for Imaginary Friends), producer (Apple & Onion) and director (Sammy, Stuart Little, Family Guy, The Cleveland Show).
- June 23: Joss Whedon, American filmmaker, composer and screenwriter (Toy Story, Titan A.E., Atlantis: The Lost Empire, voice of Randy's Friend, FCC Member, Oompa Loompa, Father, Cowboy, Scientist and himself in Robot Chicken).
- June 29:
  - Kathleen Wilhoite, American actress and musician (voice of the title characters in Cathy and Pepper Ann, Cindy in 3-South, Sue Peltzer and Oscar's Mom in Summer Camp Island, Sam in the Family Guy episode "To Love and Die in Dixie").
  - Peter Jessop, American actor (voice of Vision in The Avengers: Earth's Mightiest Heroes, Salaak in Green Lantern: Emerald Knights, Steppenwolf in the Justice League Action episode "Under a Red Sun").

=== July ===
- July 2: Jose Canseco, Cuban-American former baseball player (voiced himself in The Simpsons episode "Homer at the Bat").
- July 3:
  - Yeardley Smith, French-born American voice actress (voice of Lisa Simpson in The Simpsons, Cecilia in We're Back! A Dinosaur's Story).
  - Christophe di Sabatino, French animation producer (co-founder of MoonScoop).
- July 4: Mark Slaughter, American singer, musician and member of Slaughter (voice of Lord Bravery's Mother in the Freakazoid! episode "Sewer Rescue", Pie Joker in the Batman Beyond episode "Bloodsport", Queen Elizabeth the Queen Mother in the Animaniacs episode "Windsor Hassle").
- July 7: Tatsuo Sato, Japanese screenwriter (Martian Successor Nadesico, Cat Soup), director (Akazukin Chacha, Martian Successor Nadesico, Cat Soup, Ninja Scroll: The Series), producer Sister Princess, Azumanga Daioh), and storyboard artist (Martian Successor Nadesico, Shaman King, Azumanga Daioh, Ninja Scroll: The Series), (d. 2026).
- July 9: Bill Wise, American actor (voice of Knuckles the Echidna in Sonic the Hedgehog: The Movie, Screenslaver in Incredibles 2), (d. 2026).
- July 11: Lebo M, South African producer and composer (The Lion King).
- July 20: Dan McGrath, American screenwriter (The Simpsons, King of the Hill, Gravity Falls, The PJs, Mission Hill), producer (The Simpsons, King of the Hill, Mission Hill) and actor (voice of Jamaican Radio Rapper in the King of the Hill episode "Full Metal Dust Jacket"), (d. 2025).
- July 21: Riina Sildos, Estonian film producer (Lotte from Gadgetville, Lotte and the Moonstone Secret).
- July 22: David Spade, American actor and comedian (voice of Kuzco in The Emperor's New Groove franchise, Griffin the Invisible Man in the Hotel Transylvania franchise).
- July 23: Matilda Ziegler, English actress (voice of Irma Gobb in Mr. Bean: The Animated Series).
- July 26: Sandra Bullock, American actress and producer (voice of Miriam in The Prince of Egypt, Scarlet Overkill in Minions).
- July 28: Lori Loughlin, American actress (voice of Tracy Simmons in the Justice League Unlimited episode "The Greatest Story Never Told", Marina Draskovich in the Johnny Bravo episode "Some Walk by Night").
- July 29: Tom Martin, American television producer, writer, and voice actor (The Simpsons, Clone High, Out of Jimmy's Head, Unstable Fables, Randy Cunningham: 9th Grade Ninja, WordGirl, Talking Tom and Friends, Doug Unplugs).
- July 30:
  - Vivica A. Fox, American actress (voice of Angel Dynamite/Cassidy Williams in Scooby-Doo! Mystery Incorporated, Future Monique in Kim Possible: A Sitch in Time, Dotty Tortoise in Unstable Fables: Tortoise vs. Hare, Ellen Patella in Ozzy & Drix, Lotte Lavoie in Scooby-Doo! Stage Fright, Black Velvet in the Loonatics Unleashed episode "The Cloak of Black Velvet", Carol in the Sofia the First episode "Carol of the Arrow", Margaret in The Proud Family episode "Seven Days of Kwanzaa").
  - Jim Wise, American actor (voice of Loud Howard in Dilbert, Fripp in Higglytown Heroes, Mr. Durbin in the American Dad! episode "Star Trek", Dr. Byrne in The Zeta Project episode "Wired", Maddie in the Batman Beyond episode "Ace in the Hole").

=== August ===
- August 7: Tom McGrath, American animator (The Ren and Stimpy Show), director (DreamWorks Animation) and actor.
- August 10: Bret Haaland, American animator (The Simpsons), storyboard artist (DreamWorks Animation), producer (Kung Fu Panda: Legends of Awesomeness, Monsters vs. Aliens) and director (The Critic, Futurama, DreamWorks Animation Television).
- August 16: William Salyers, American actor (voice of Rigby in Regular Show, Reverend Putty in Moral Orel, Ultron in Avengers Assemble).
- August 18: Paul Boocock, American actor and writer (voice of Dr. Jonas Venture in The Venture Bros.).
- August 20: Flaminia Cinque, English actress (voice of Lillian Gopher in Gophers!, Flamingo in Tinga Tinga Tales, Ester and Dame Bella Canto in Thomas & Friends).
- August 21: Susan Eisenberg, American actress (voice of Wonder Woman in the DC Animated Universe, Superman/Batman: Apocalypse, and Justice League: Doom, Viper in Jackie Chan Adventures, The Sorceress in Masters of the Universe: Revelation, Power Princess in The Super Hero Squad Show episode "Whom Continuity Would Destroy!", Sela in the Avatar: The Last Airbender episode "Zuko Alone").
- August 22: Tom Gibis, American actor (voice of Shikamaru Nara in Naruto, Takumi Nomiya in Honey and Clover, Mushra in Shinzo).
- August 24: Dana Gould, American actor (voice of Producer, Barney Fife, Air Marshall and Murphy in The Simpsons, Hi Larious in Father of the Pride, himself in the Family Guy episode "Brian Writes a Bestseller", and The Simpsons episode "Screenless", additional voices in Doug and Clerks: The Animated Series), television writer and producer (The Simpsons).
- August 25: Joanne Whalley, English actress (voice of Emerald Empress and Phantom Girl in the Justice League Unlimited episode "Far From Home").

=== September ===
- September 2:
  - Keanu Reeves, Canadian actor (portrayed Sage in The SpongeBob Movie: Sponge on the Run, voice of Ted Logan in season 1 of Bill & Ted's Excellent Adventures, Neo in The Animatrix, Duke Caboom in Toy Story 4, Batman in DC League of Super-Pets, Shadow the Hedgehog in Sonic the Hedgehog 3).
  - Tom Brady, American television producer and writer (The Simpsons, The Critic, Good Vibes, The PJs).
- September 3: Spike Feresten, American comedian, television personality and screenwriter (The Simpsons, Space Ghost Coast to Coast, Bee Movie).
- September 6: Rosie Perez, American actress (voice of Chel in The Road to El Dorado, Petra in Human Resources, Cipactli in Maya and the Three, Aunt Rose in Penn Zero: Part-Time Hero, Click in Go, Diego, Go!).
- September 8: Mitchell Whitfield, American actor (voice of Donatello in TMNT, Prince Phobos in W.I.T.C.H., Fixit in Transformers: Robots in Disguise, Norbert Foster Beaver in The Angry Beavers episode "Snowbound", Humpty Dumpty in Goldie & Bear, Professor Palladium in Winx Club, Demi in Vampirina, Gun in The Legend of Korra, Avra in Green Lantern: Emerald Knights, Oooey Kablooey in Doc McStuffins, Russell Thorn in Hellboy: Sword of Storms).
- September 16: Molly Shannon, American actress and comedian (voice of Wanda in the Hotel Transylvania franchise, Eva in Igor, Matsuko Yamada in My Neighbors the Yamadas, Kristy in American Dad!, Millie in Bob's Burgers, Murna in Spy Kids: Mission Critical, Heather Asplund in the Johnny Bravo episode "It's Valentine's Day Johnny Bravo!", Pretties in the My Gym Partner's a Monkey episode "I Fear Pretties", Rita in the Doc McStuffins episode "No Sweetah Cheetah").
- September 17: Richard Pursel, American animator (Tiny Toon Adventures), storyboard artist (Tiny Toon Adventures, The Ren & Stimpy Show, I Am Weasel, Ren & Stimpy "Adult Party Cartoon") and television writer (Hanna-Barbera, Spümcø, The New Woody Woodpecker Show, Poochini, Robotboy, Tom and Jerry Tales, SpongeBob SquarePants, The Super Hero Squad Show, Ben 10: Omniverse, Mickey Mouse, New Looney Tunes, El Americano: The Movie, Home: Adventures with Tip & Oh, Mighty Magiswords, The Mighty Ones).
- September 18: Holly Robinson Peete, American actress (voice of Joelle Fillmore in the Fillmore! episode "Cry, the Beloved Mascot", Kathleen Lord in The Proud Family: Louder and Prouder episode "BeBe").
- September 21: Galyn Susman, American animator, technical director and producer (Pixar).
- September 23: Erik Dellums, American actor (voice of Aaravos in The Dragon Prince, Koh the Face Stealer in the Avatar: The Last Airbender episode "The Siege of the North").
- September 24: J. Michael Mendel, American television producer (The Simpsons, The Critic, The PJs, The Oblongs, Kid Notorious, Drawn Together, Lil' Bush, Sit Down, Shut Up, Good Vibes, Napoleon Dynamite, Rick and Morty, Solar Opposites), (d. 2019).
- September 28:
  - Janeane Garofalo, American actress, comedian and host (voice of Colette in Ratatouille, Stith in Titan A.E., Emily Blake in Sammy, Ursula in Kiki's Delivery Service, Bridget in The Wild, Bearded Clam in Freak Show, Abigail Remeltindrinc in Metalocalypse, Madam Malin and Uncle Panda in We Baby Bears, Moonbeam in the Duckman episode "The Germ Turns", Sheila in the King of the Hill episode "Night and Deity", Donna in the Aqua Teen Hunger Force episode "Hypno-Germ", Isabelle in the BoJack Horseman episode "Feel-Good Story", Denise in the Fairfax episode "Chernobylfest", herself in the Dr. Katz, Professional Therapist episode "Drinky the Drunk Guy" and The Simpsons episodes "The Last Temptation of Krust" and "The Ten-Per-Cent Solution").
  - Dan Greaney, American television writer and producer (The Simpsons).

=== October ===
- October 5: Keiji Fujiwara, Japanese actor (voice of Maes Hughes in Fullmetal Alchemist, Ladd Russo in Baccano, Hiroshi Nohara in Crayon Shin-chan, Leorio Paladiknight in Hunter x Hunter, Iron Man in Marvel Anime: Iron Man, Baron Salamander in HeartCatch PreCure The Movie: Fashion Show in the Flower Capital... Really?!, Japanese dub voice of Spellbinder in Batman Beyond, Sinbad in Sinbad: Legend of the Seven Seas, Joker in Batman: The Brave and the Bold, Grimlock in Transformers: Animated, Lord Shen in Kung Fu Panda 2), (d. 2020).
- October 6: Matthew Sweet, American alternative rock musician (wrote, composed and performed "Hopin' for a Dream" in The Simpsons episode "Covercraft", composed the theme of Scooby-Doo! Mystery Incorporated).
- October 9: Guillermo del Toro, Mexican film and television producer (DreamWorks Animation).
- October 10:
  - Quinton Flynn, American actor (voice of the title character in The Real Adventures of Jonny Quest, Timon in the first season of Timon & Pumbaa, the Human Torch in season 2 of Fantastic Four, Lightning in Teen Titans, Reno in Final Fantasy VII: Advent Children, Iruka Umino in Naruto, Malekith in The Avengers: Earth's Mightiest Heroes episode "The Casket of Ancient Winters").
  - Tim Miller, American filmmaker, animator, visual effects artist (Love, Death & Robots, Gopher Broke).
- October 11: Michael J. Nelson, American actor, comedian and television writer (VeggieTales in the House).
- October 12:
  - Allen Covert, American comedian, actor, writer (Eight Crazy Nights) and producer (Hotel Transylvania, Hotel Transylvania 2).
  - John Achenbach, American animator (The Simpsons, Mission Hill), storyboard artist (The Simpsons, Spaceballs: The Animated Series, The Haunted World of El Superbeasto) and director (Beavis and Butt-Head Do the Universe).
- October 13:
  - Matthew Nastuk, American animator, color key artist (Swamp Thing, The Real Ghostbusters, Duckman), background artist (Rugrats) and director (The Simpsons).
  - Adam Shaheen, British-Canadian artist, television producer and screenwriter (co-founder of Cuppa Coffee Studios).
- October 14:
  - David Kaye, Canadian actor (voice of Megatron in Transformers, Sesshomaru in Inuyasha, Treize Khushrenada in Gundam Wing, Clank in Ratchet & Clank, Max Tennyson, Lord Decibel, LaGrange, and Shock-O in Ben 10, Khyber, Skurd, Lord Transyl, Exo-Skull, George Washington, and various Omnitrix aliens in Ben 10: Omniverse, Optimus Prime in Transformers: Animated).
  - Steve Markowski, American animator (Christmas in Tattertown, FernGully: The Last Rainforest, Cats Don't Dance, The Iron Giant, The ChubbChubbs!) and storyboard artist (The Simpsons, The Critic, The Iron Giant, The Road to El Dorado, Walt Disney Animation Studios).
- October 17: Rob Gibbs, American animator (FernGully: The Last Rainforest, Cool World, Dinosaur), storyboard artist (Hyperion Pictures, Pixar, The Boss Baby, Snoopy Presents: To Mom (and Dad), With Love), writer and director (Cars Toons), (d. 2020).
- October 19: Ty Pennington, American television host, artist, carpenter, author, former model and actor (voice of the title character in the Wow! Wow! Wubbzy! episode "Ty Ty the Tool Guy").
- October 21: Dana Landsberg, American animator, writer and designer (Disney Television Animation), (d. 2009).
- October 23: David Sobolov, Canadian actor (voice of Drax the Destroyer in Guardians of the Galaxy, Ultimate Spider-Man, Hulk and the Agents of S.M.A.S.H., and Avengers Assemble, Gorilla Grodd in Justice League Action, Vin Ethanol and Upgrade in Ben 10, Beast Charge in Beast Wars: Transformers, RoboCop in RoboCop: Alpha Commando, Spookie Jar in Sabrina: The Animated Series, Lord Tyger in Spider-Man Unlimited, Lobo in Young Justice, Garish in Sofia the First).
- October 24: Linda Ballantyne, Canadian voice actress (voice of the title character in the original english dub of Sailor Moon, Wasp in The Avengers: United They Stand, Wicked in Cyberchase, Champ Bear in the Care Bears franchise, Kazarina in Bakugan: Gundalian Invaders, Violet Vanderfleet in Totally Spies, Queen Mayla in Mia and Me, Percy in Thomas and the Magic Railroad, Magnolia in George of the Jungle, Wargrunt in Fangbone!, Tulip in Toot & Puddle).
- October 25: Kevin Michael Richardson, American actor (voice of Captain Gantu in the Lilo & Stitch franchise, Trigon, Mammoth and See-More in Teen Titans and Teen Titans Go!, Robert Hawkins in Static Shock, Joker in The Batman, Maurice in The Penguins of Madagascar and All Hail King Julien, various characters in Batman: The Brave and the Bold, Mr. Gus in Uncle Grandpa, Groot in Guardians of the Galaxy, Avengers Assemble and Hulk and the Agents of S.M.A.S.H., Happy in The 7D, continued voice of Barney Rubble in The Flintstones and Dr. Hibbert in The Simpsons).
- October 31:
  - Antoinette Spolar, American actress (voice of Ms. Leading in The Marvelous Misadventures of Flapjack, Auntie Bess in the Sofia the First episode "Ghostly Gala", additional voices in Toonsylvania and Invader Zim).
  - Deborah Sale Butler, American voice actress (voice of Cécile Croomy in Code Geass).

=== November ===
- November 1: Daran Norris, American actor (voice of Cosmo in The Fairly OddParents, J. Jonah Jameson in The Spectacular Spider-Man, Dick Daring in The Replacements, Jack Smith in American Dad!, the Chief in T.U.F.F. Puppy, Seymour Smooth in WordGirl, Alexander Lloyds in Tiger & Bunny).
- November 10: Magnús Scheving, Icelandic writer, entrepreneur, producer, actor, model and athlete (created and portrayed Sportacus in LazyTown).
- November 11: Calista Flockhart, American actress (voice of April Howsam in Invincible, Doris in The Penguins of Madagascar episode "The Penguin Who Loved Me", Vanna Van in the Happily Ever After: Fairy Tales for Every Child episode "Rip Van Winkle").
- November 14: Patrick Warburton, American actor (voice of Kronk in The Emperor's New Groove franchise, Brock Samson in The Venture Bros, Joe Swanson in Family Guy, Steve Barkin in Kim Possible, Buzz Lightyear in Buzz Lightyear of Star Command, Mr. X in The X's, Sheriff Stone in Scooby-Doo! Mystery Incorporated, Walter Wolf in Hoodwinked! and Hoodwinked Too! Hood vs. Evil, Ken in Bee Movie, Flynn in Skylanders Academy, Grandpa Shark in Baby Shark's Big Show!, Ian in Open Season, Agamemnon in Mr. Peabody & Sherman, Superman in American Express commercials).
- November 16: Harry Lennix, American actor (voice of Black Manta in Justice League: Throne of Atlantis, Mar Londo in the Legion of Super Heroes episode "Timber Wolf").
- November 17:
  - Saori Sugimoto, Japanese actress (voice of Sanae Minami in Green Green, Catherine Bloom in Mobile Suit Gundam Wing, Ramurin Makiba and Nyakkii Momoyama in Shima Shima Tora no Shimajirō), (d. 2021).
  - Ralph Garman, American actor (voice of Wizard in Lego DC Batman: Family Matters and Lego DC Shazam! Magic and Monsters, Mojo in the Avengers Assemble episode "Mojo World", additional voices in Family Guy).
- November 20: Luis Alfonso Mendoza, Mexican actor (dub voice of Gohan in Dragon Ball Z and Dragon Ball GT, Leonardo in Teenage Mutant Ninja Turtles), (d. 2020).
- November 24: Chris Reccardi, American animator (The New Adventures of Beany and Cecil, The Butter Battle Book, Tiny Toon Adventures, The Simpsons, The Ren & Stimpy Show, Hercules and Xena - The Animated Movie: The Battle for Mount Olympus, Cloudy with a Chance of Meatballs, The Lego Movie, designed the end credits sequence of Hotel Transylvania 3: Summer Vacation), storyboard artist (Tiny Toon Adventures, Nickelodeon Animation Studio, Universal Cartoon Studios, Cow and Chicken, I Am Weasel, Dilbert, Cartoon Network Studios, DreamWorks Animation, The Haunted World of El Superbeasto, The Ricky Gervais Show, Kick Buttowski: Suburban Daredevil, Tron: Uprising, The Mighty Ones), character designer (Wander Over Yonder, Samurai Jack), background artist (Foster's Home for Imaginary Friends, Mickey Mouse), graphic designer, musician, writer (The Ren & Stimpy Show, Cartoon Network Studios, SpongeBob SquarePants, Billy Dilley's Super-Duper Subterranean Summer), director (The Ren & Stimpy Show, Super Robot Monkey Team Hyperforce Go!) and producer (Regular Show), (d. 2019).
- November 29: Don Cheadle, American actor (voice of Donald Duck in DuckTales, The Commander in Agent Elvis, Brother Faith in The Simpsons episode "Faith Off", Al-G Rhythm in Space Jam: A New Legacy, James Rhodes in the What If...? episode "What If... Killmonger Rescued Tony Stark?").

=== December ===
- December 1: Pierre Valette, American television producer (Arthur, Postcards from Buster).
- December 4:
  - Christopher B. Duncan, American actor (voice of Dunkan Bulk in Hero Factory, Luke Cage in The Avengers: Earth's Mightiest Heroes, Mr. Webb in The Proud Family episode "Culture Shock").
  - Marisa Tomei, American actress (voice of Bree Blackburn in The Wild Thornberrys Movie, Sara Sloane in The Simpsons episode "A Star Is Born Again").
- December 10: Mark Moseley, American voice actor, comedian, radio personality, singer and songwriter (voice of Thurgoode Stubbs in The PJs, Mushu in Mulan II and House of Mouse, Agamemnon in The Mr. Peabody & Sherman Show).
- December 11: J. Garett Sheldrew, American animator (Æon Flux, KaBlam!), storyboard artist (Æon Flux, Todd McFarlane's Spawn, Hubert's Brain, Pixar), character designer (The Wish That Changed Christmas, FernGully 2: The Magical Rescue, Hubert's Brain), writer and director (Æon Flux), (d. 2022).
- December 14:
  - Dino Stamatopoulos, American writer, producer and actor (Morel Orel, TV Funhouse, Mary Shelley's Frankenhole).
  - Karey Kirkpatrick, American film director (Over the Hedge, Smallfoot) and screenwriter (James and the Giant Peach, Chicken Run).
- December 15: Pete Michels, American animator (The Simpsons, The Critic), storyboard artist (The Simpsons, Klutter!, The Twisted Tales of Felix the Cat, Family Guy, Bless the Harts), sheet timer (Bobby's World, Klasky Csupo, Klutter!, The Angry Beavers, The Simpsons, Family Guy, Trolls: The Beat Goes On!), producer (Hot Streets) and director (Rugrats, Rocko's Modern Life, Bobby's World, The Twisted Tales of Felix the Cat, The Simpsons, Family Guy, Kid Notorious, Rick and Morty, Future-Worm!, Hot Streets, Bless the Harts, Inside Job, Farzar).
- December 17: Steve Marmel, American television producer and writer (Hanna-Barbera, Ace Ventura: Pet Detective, Nickelodeon Animation Studio, Yin Yang Yo!, Family Guy).
- December 18: Stone Cold Steve Austin, American media personality, actor and retired professional wrestler (voiced himself in Celebrity Deathmatch and the Dilbert episode "The Delivery").
- December 20: Ayumu Saito, Japanese actor (voice of Wabisuke Jin'ouchi in Summer Wars), (d. 2025).
- December 24: Mark Valley, American actor (voice of Superman in Batman: The Dark Knight Returns, Cyclops in Shrek the Third).
- December 30: George Newbern, American actor (voice of Superman in the DC Animated Universe, The Batman, Superman/Shazam!: The Return of Black Adam, and Superman vs. The Elite, Bizarro and Evil Star in Justice League Unlimited, Ren in The Pirates of Dark Water, Sephiroth in Final Fantasy VII: Advent Children).
- December 31: Michael McDonald, American actor, comedian, screenwriter and director (voice of Gandhi in Clone High, Howard McBride in The Loud House).

=== Specific date unknown ===
- Bruce Alcock, Canadian filmmaker and creative director (Vive la rose, Impromptu, founder of Global Mechanic, co-founder of Cuppa Coffee Studios).

== Deaths ==
=== January ===
- January 16: Cy Young, Chinese-American special effects animator (Walt Disney Company), commits suicide at age 66.

=== February ===
- February 20: Darrell Calker, American composer (wrote music for Walter Lantz cartoons), dies at age 59.

=== July ===
- July 1: Antonio Rubino, Italian animation director, cartoonist, illustrator, playwright, and screenwriter, (directed the animated films Paese dei Ranocchi (The Land of the Frogs) and I sette colori (The Seven Colors), contributor to the Disney comics magazine Topolino which featured the character of Mickey Mouse), dies at age 84.
- July 30: Seymour Kneitel, American animator (Fleischer Studios, Famous Studios), dies at age 56.

=== August ===
- August 10: Carlo Cossio, Italian comics artist and animator, dies at age 57.
- August 29: Rube Grossman, American comics artist and animator (Fleischer Brothers, Felix the Cat), dies at age 51.

=== September ===
- September 24: Paul E. Kahle, German orientalist, (discovered leather puppets near Damietta, Egypt which were used in medieval shadow plays, one of the precursors of silhouette animation), dies at age 89.

=== October ===
- October 1: Frank Moser, American artist, illustrator, film director and animator (co-founder of Terrytoons), dies at age 78.
- October 10: Eddie Cantor, American actor, singer, songwriter and screenwriter (co-wrote Merrily We Roll Along for Merrie Melodies), dies at age 72.
- October 19: Maurice Gosfield, American actor (voice of Benny in Top Cat), dies at age 51.

=== November ===
- November 16: Albert Hay Malotte, American pianist, organist, composer and educator (Walt Disney Animation Studios), dies at age 69.
- November 30: Don Redman, American jazz composer and singer (guest starred in the Betty Boop short I Heard), dies at age 64.

=== December ===
- December 10: Bob Kuwahara, Japanese-American animator and comics artist (Walt Disney Animation Studios, Metro-Goldwyn-Mayer cartoon studio, Terrytoons), dies at age 63.

== See also ==
- 1964 in anime
