= Magnet (disambiguation) =

A magnet is an object that has a magnetic field.

Magnet or magnets may also refer to:

== Places ==
- Magnet, Allier, a town in France
- Magnet, California, an unincorporated community in Madera County
- Magnet, Illinois, an unincorporated community in Coles County
- Magnet, Indiana, an unincorporated community in Perry County
- Magnet, Nebraska, a village in the United States
- Magnet, Texas, an unincorporated community in the United States

== In music ==
- Magnet (musician) (born 1970), Norwegian singer-songwriter
- Magnet (band), a folk band
- Magnet (magazine), a music magazine
- Magnet Records, a record label
- The Magnets, a UK a cappella vocal group

=== Albums ===
- Magnet (album), a 2003 album by Robin Gibb
- Magnets (album), by The Vapors

=== Songs ===
- "Magnet" (BGYO song), 2022
- "Magnet" (Cardi B song), 2025
- "Magnets" (song), a 2015 song by Disclosure
- "Magnet", a song by Bikini Kill from Pussy Whipped
- "Magnet", a song by Bombay Bicycle Club from I Had the Blues But I Shook Them Loose
- "Magnet", a song by Punch Brothers from The Phosphorescent Blues
- "Magnets", a song by the Vapors and title track of Magnets

== Other entertainment ==
- "The Magnet", an episode of The Flumps
- The Magnet, an early 20th-century British story paper
- The Magnet Theater, an improv theater
- Magnet Releasing, an independent theatrical films distributor
- Magnet (children's television block)

== Other uses ==
- Magnet school, specialized public school in the United States
- Magnet Kitchens, a kitchen retailer based in the UK and Ireland
  - Magnet Trade, a brand belonging to Magnet Kitchens
- Maritime Awareness Global Network, a US Coast Guard intelligence tool
- HMS Magnet, more than one ship of the British Royal Navy
- USS Magnet, more than one ship of the United States Navy
- Magnet Networks, an internet, video and voice services provider in Ireland and the UK
- Magnet Recognition Program, a nursing recognition program
- Magnet URI scheme, a scheme for Uniform Resource Identifiers, often used with peer-to-peer networks

== See also ==
- Magnit, Russian food retailer
- Misspelling of Magnate
