= HBO Kids =

American children's programming block (2001–2024)

- Final logo used from 2016 to 2024
- Network: HBO Family
- Launched: August 26, 2001; 24 years ago
- Closed: February 29, 2024; 2 years ago
- Country of origin: United States
- Owner: Home Box Office, Inc. (Warner Bros. Discovery)
- Formerly known as: Jam (2001–2016)
- Sister network: Magnet (2001–2005)
- Running time: 6 am-3 pm (2001–04); 6 am-1:30 pm (2004–05); 6 am-9 am (2005–06, then again 2020–21); 6 am-12:00 pm (2006–07); 6 am-8 am (2007–2011); 4 pm-5 pm (formerly); 6 am-11 am (2011–20); 6 am-10 am (2020); 6 am-8 am (2021—24)
- Original language: English

HBO Kids (formerly Jam) was an American preschool/children's television morning programming block operated by Home Box Office, Inc. (HBO), a division of Warner Bros. Discovery. The block ran on HBO Family, HBO's sister station that targets children and families.

The block ran from 6:00 am to roughly 8:00 to 9:00 am (ET) on weekdays; the block's programs were not shown in a standard half-hour timeslot. In the mid-2010s, the block had a weekday 4 pm timeslot, which was filled with The Electric Company. The block also aired on weekends until October 2020.

== History ==
In 2001, HBO Family launched two children's programming blocks: Jam in the morning, and Magnet on weekday afternoons. Programming for both blocks was developed in coordination with CINAR Animation, Nelvana Limited, Sony Pictures Television, Sandpaper Films, Scholastic, Devine Entertainment, S4C, HIT Entertainment, Golden Egg Entertainment, Poseidon Pictures, Cuppa Coffee Studios, Curious Pictures, Hyperion Pictures, and Planet Grande. Starting in 2007, with a new set of CGI bumpers for the block, HBO began to slowly remove the block's acquired programming, exclusively focusing on HBO's original children's series. For several years, no new programs were produced or acquired for the block, focusing exclusively on reruns of HBO's own children's programs.

On August 13, 2015, HBO announced a deal with Sesame Workshop to move first-run Sesame Street episodes on HBO. New episodes of Sesame Street began premiering on the network on January 16, 2016, alongside reruns of other Sesame Workshop-produced programming, including The Electric Company and Pinky Dinky Doo. Jam would later rebrand as HBO Kids. On November 12, 2020, first-run Sesame Street episodes moved to HBO Max starting with its 51st season.

On August 18, 2018, the animated series Esme & Roy, also produced by Sesame Workshop, premiered. HBO removed all Sesame Workshop shows from its HBO Family channel by January 2021, reverting the block back to HBO's original children's series. However, most of the acquired shows from Sesame Workshop remained available on the HBO Max streaming service until January 2, 2021, with only Sesame Street, Esme & Roy, and any Sesame Workshop show made exclusive for the streaming service still being available. From that point, the block's schedule featured four of HBO's original children's programs, followed by a children's television special, before airing one more program, then starting one of the channel's circulated movies or specials.

On February 29, 2024, the block ended; no explanation was given, although HBO and its parent company Warner Bros. Discovery chose to focus less on children's programming as they had low viewership on Max; Eventually, the block's parent channel HBO Family closed on August 15, 2025.

== Programming ==
=== Final programming ===
- ^{1} = Aired occasionally.

==== Original programming ====
Title	Original run	HBO Kids run	Source(s)
A Little Curious	February 1, 1999 – May 1, 2000	August 26, 2001 – February 29, 2024	(Note: This show had aired on HBO Family 1999 since before airing on Jam.)
Crashbox^{1}	February 1, 1999 – April 1, 2000	January 2005 - February 2024	(Note: The show originally aired on Magnet, before moving to Jam in January 2005.) (Note: This show had aired on HBO Family 1999 since before airing on Jam.)
Kindergarten^{1}	August 26, 2001 – September 7, 2001	August 26, 2001 – February 29, 2024	
HBO Storybook Musicals^{1}	November 18, 1987 – December 8, 1993	August 26, 2001 – February 29, 2024	
Classical Baby^{1}	May 14, 2005 – 2017	May 14, 2005 – 2024	

=== Former programming ===
Title	Original run	HBO Kids run	Source(s)
El Perro y El Gato^{1 (Note: The show was first an interstitial series in 2004, before becoming a half-hour series in 2008.)}	2004 – 2011	2008 – February 29, 2024	(Note: This is the TV series (not to be confused with the interstitial series), which is still airing.)
Happily Ever After: Fairy Tales for Every Child^{1}	March 12, 1995 – July 18, 2000	August 26, 2001 – February 29, 2024	(Note: The show had aired on HBO since 1995 before airing on Jam.) (Note: Season 1 and 2 first aired only on the HBO channel, before being moved to HBO Family to air its third season there.)

- Freshman Year (2007 – 2011) (reruns)
- Harold and the Purple Crayon (December 1, 2001 – 2011)
- I Spy (December 2002 – July 2011)
- Stuart Little (2003–2011)

==== Former acquired programming ====
- The Adventures of Paddington Bear (February 1, 1999 – 2004)
- Animated Tales of the World (2001–08)
- Anthony Ant (1999–2003)
- Babar (2001–04)
- The Country Mouse and the City Mouse Adventures (1998–2004)
- Encyclopedia (January 1, 2000 – 2002)
- Esme & Roy
- Fraggle Rock (December 2016 – 2019) (now on Apple TV+)
- George and Martha (2001–09)
- Ghost Trackers (2007–10)
- The Little Lulu Show (1997–2004)
- Magic Cellar (2007–08)
- The Neverending Story (1999–2004)
- Pippi Longstocking (1998–99)
- Postman Pat (September 1, 2005 – September 30, 2007)
- Rainbow Fish (February 18, 2000 – 2006)
- Sesame Street (Note: The show started releasing new episodes on HBO Max in 2020, starting with season 51.) (January 17, 2016 – November 1, 2020, now on PBS Kids and Max)
- The Storyteller (1998–2000)

==== Reruns of ended Sesame Workshop programming ====
Title	Original network	Original run	HBO Kids run	Source(s)
The Electric Company	PBS Kids Go! PBS Kids	January 23, 2009 – April 4, 2011	January 17, 2016 – November 1, 2020	
Pinky Dinky Doo	Noggin/Nick Jr. Channel; CBC Kids; CBeebies; Discovery Kids	April 10, 2006 – June 17, 2010	January 17, 2016 – January 2, 2021	

==== Short-form programming ====
- 30 by 30: Kid Flicks (1999–2001)
- HBO Family: 411 (1999–2016)
- Who Knew? (1999–2016)
- Smart Mouth (1999–16)
- Jammin' Animals (2001–16)
- My Favorite Book (2001–16)
- The Way I See It (2001–16)
- El Perro y El Gato (2004–16)
- Just Wondering (2009–16)
- Sesame Street Shorts (January 17, 2016 – November 1, 2020)
- And Now You Know
- Eat 5
- I Want to Be
- Matters of Fact
- Lisa
- When I'm...
