= Bruno and the Banana Bunch =

2007 Canadian television series

- Created by: Adam Shaheen
- Based on: Bruno by Adam Shaheen
- Directed by: Ken Cunningham
- Narrated by: Maurice Dean Wint
- Composer: Adam Goddard
- Country of origin: Canada
- Original language: English
- No. of seasons: 1
- No. of episodes: 26

Production
- Executive producer: Adam Shaheen
- Producer: Marika Kocaba
- Editor: Chris Marsland
- Running time: 11 minutes
- Production company: Cuppa Coffee Studios

Original release
- Network: CBC Television
- Release: April 2, 2007 – September 17, 2008

Related
- Bruno

Bruno and the Banana Bunch is a Canadian animated children's television series created by Adam Shaheen. The series debuted on CBC Television in Canada on April 2, 2007.

== Premise ==
Bruno and the Banana Bunch is about Bruno the monkey and his friends who have adventures in Bananaland.

== Characters ==
- Bruno is a playful gray monkey and the main protagonist of the show. He embarks in creative adventures every episode with his friends.
- Green Crocodile is a green crocodile and Bruno's best friend. He appears in most episodes and stands on two feet.
- Pink Cow is a pink cow with a tan mouth.
- Big Elephant is a light blue elephant and the biggest character of the Banana Bunch.
- Green Frog is a green frog with a yellow area on his stomach.
- Blue Bunny is a blue rabbit with long oval-shaped ears.
- Fluffy Sheep is a white sheep with gray skin.
- Purple Penguin is a purple penguin from the South Pole.
- Little Bird is a red bird. As her name suggests, she is the smallest character in stature.
- Yellow Duck is a yellow duck with an orange beak.
- Pink Flamingo is a tall pink flamingo with wings.

== Episodes ==
| No. | Title | Directed by | Written by | Original air date |
|---|---|---|---|---|
| 1 | "Big Top Bruno" | Unknown | Unknown | April 2, 2007 |
| 2 | "Detective Bruno" | Unknown | Unknown | April 9, 2007 |
| 3 | "Bruno's Special Stick" | Unknown | Unknown | April 16, 2007 |
| 4 | "Bruno's Paintbox" | Unknown | Unknown | April 23, 2007 |
| 5 | "Bruno's Railroad" | Unknown | Brendan Russell | April 30, 2007 |
| 6 | "Bruno's Pirate Adventure" | Unknown | Unknown | May 7, 2007 |
| 7 | "Bruno's Houseguest" | Unknown | Unknown | May 14, 2007 |
| 8 | "Bruno's Messy Robot" | Unknown | Unknown | May 21, 2007 |
| 9 | "Bruno's Racing Turtles" | Unknown | Unknown | May 28, 2007 |
| 10 | "Camp Bruno" | Unknown | Unknown | June 4, 2007 |
| 11 | "Bruno's Happy Holiday" | Unknown | Unknown | June 11, 2007 |
| 12 | "Bruno & the Silly Goose" | Unknown | Unknown | June 18, 2007 |
| 13 | "Bruno Plays Hide and Seek" | Unknown | Unknown | June 25, 2007 |
| 14 | "Super Bruno" | Unknown | Unknown | July 2, 2007 |
| 15 | "Bruno's Balloon" | Unknown | Unknown | July 9, 2007 |
| 16 | "Time Travel Bruno" | Unknown | Unknown | July 16, 2007 |
| 17 | "Bruno the Great" | Unknown | Unknown | July 23, 2007 |
| 18 | "Bruno's Piggybank" | Unknown | Unknown | July 30, 2007 |
| 19 | "Bruno's Bananaland Games" | Unknown | Unknown | July 30, 2007 |
| 20 | "Mini Putt Bruno" | Unknown | Unknown | August 6, 2007 |
| 21 | "Bruno and the Mystery Guest" | Unknown | Unknown | August 13, 2007 |
| 22 | "Bruno's Backwards Day" | Unknown | Unknown | August 20, 2007 |
| 23 | "Big Bruno, Little Bruno" | Unknown | Unknown | August 27, 2008 |
| 24 | "Bruno's Band" | Unknown | Unknown | September 3, 2008 |
| 25 | "Bruno's Big Day" | Unknown | Unknown | September 10, 2008 |
| 26 | "Bruno's Rocket Ship" | Unknown | Unknown | September 17, 2008 |
