= The Magnet (disambiguation) =

The Magnet was a British story paper.

The Magnet may also refer to:

- Bob "the Magnet" Addy, a Canadian baseball player
- The Magnet (novel), a 1931 novel by Maxim Gorky
- The Magnet (film), a 1950 Ealing Studios comedy film
- The Magnet (Nedor), a minor fictional hero from the Golden Age of Comics
- "The Magnet" (The Flumps), a children's television episode
- Comme un aimant, a 2000 French film also known as The Magnet

== See also ==
- Magnet (disambiguation)
