= Guy Béart =

French singer and songwriter

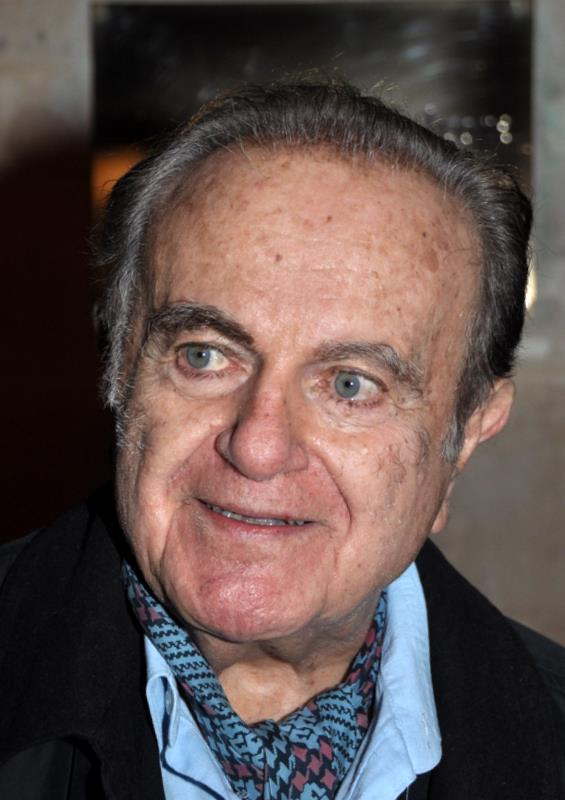
- Guy Béart in 2012
- Born: Guy Béhart-Hasson; 16 July 1930; Cairo, Kingdom of Egypt
- Died: 16 September 2015 (aged 85); Garches, France
- Occupations: Singer; Songwriter
- Spouses: Cécile de Bonnefoy du Charmel; Geneviève Galéa
- Children: Ève Béart; Emmanuelle Béart

Guy Béhart-Hasson (French: [beaʁ]; 16 July 1930 – 16 September 2015), known as Guy Béart, was a French singer and songwriter.

== Life and career ==
Béart was born Guy Béhart-Hasson (originally spelled Béhar-Hassan) in Cairo, Egypt, to a Sephardic Jewish family. His father's work as an accountant and business consultant saw the family move frequently, leading to a childhood spent in France, Greece, and Mexico, in addition to Egypt. His family settled in Lebanon where he did his secondary studies, between ten and seventeen years old, age at which he obtained his French baccalaureate in elementary mathematics at the International College of Beirut, where his interest in music developed to the point that he left for Paris to study at the "École nationale de musique". In addition to music, he also obtained a degree in engineering.

When his father died in 1952, the young Béhart chose to pursue a career in engineering in order to help support his family, studying at the prestigious École nationale des ponts et chaussées. Simultaneously, however, he enrolled in Paris's École nationale de musique, studying violin and mandolin, and in his spare time wrote songs and worked the Paris cabaret circuit, where he played guitar and sang under the stage name "Guy Béart". When a version of one of his songs by a popular performer of the day became a huge success, demand for his writing talents increased and he composed for Juliette Gréco and others. Taken under the wing of renowned music producer Jacques Canetti and fellow musician Boris Vian, he released an album of his own, which won the prestigious Grand Prix de l'Académie du Disque français in 1958.

Normally shy, Béart initially suffered from stage fright and struggled during his concert debut at the Paris Olympia. His biggest hit came when he wrote the soundtrack of the 1958 motion picture, L'Eau vive (Girl and the River in the US). The title song of the film is considered a classic of what is known as French chanson. Despite his leap to fame, Béart's singing career was soon swamped by the rising tide of American rock and roll. However, reinventing himself as a host of a television show featuring musical stars from a variety of genres, he remained in the public eye and eventually made a recording comeback.

From his first wife Cécile de Bonnefoy du Charmel he had a daughter, Ève (born 1959).

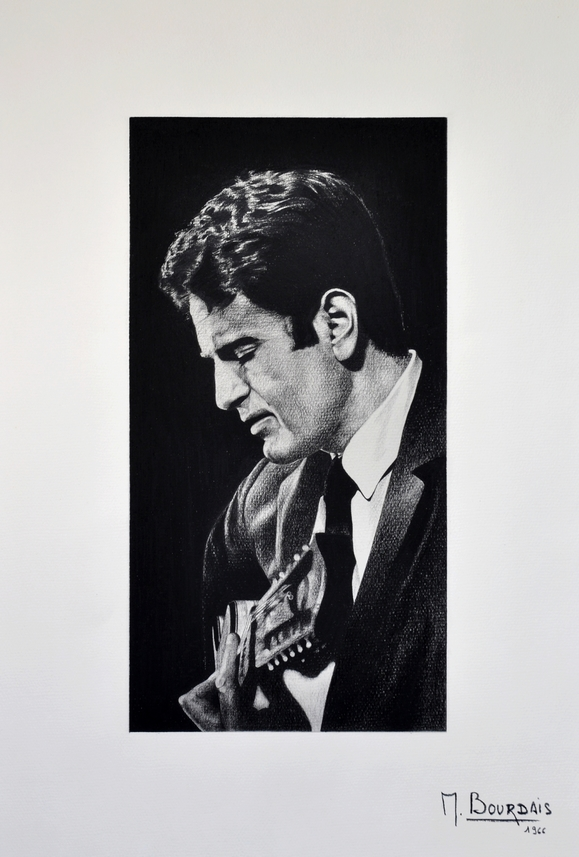
Drawing representing Guy Béart and made by Michel Bourdais in July 1966 during the TV shows Bienvenue chez Guy Béart .

In 1963 he and his second wife, Geneviève Galéa (pseudonym of Geneviève Guillery), had a daughter, Emmanuelle, who would grow up to be an actress.

After Béart's television show ended in 1970, his popularity waned but he continued to record new music that was readily purchased by a loyal following. He was the co-composer of the 1977 Luxembourg entry at the Eurovision Song Contest. By the early 1980s he was almost completely out of the spotlight and, although only in his early fifties, he suffered from a number of serious health problems. In 1987, he published a book about his illness entitled Crazy Hope that, combined with his daughter's success in the blockbuster film Manon of the Spring, brought a resurgence of popularity. More than 25 years after his first appearance at the Paris Olympia, he returned for a series of highly successful performances.

In 1994, Béart was awarded the Grand Prix de l'Académie française in recognition of his achievements over his long career. He continued to perform at a variety of venues around the country and in 1999 did a five-week run at Bobino in Montparnasse that was so popular it allowed for a successful re-release of his double live album recorded at the Olympia.

In the 2000s, he only made rare appearances on stage but many of his songs, of which Béart wrote more than 300 by himself, are still popular with his fans.

Béart died of a heart attack at the age of 85 in Garches, on 16 September 2015.

== Discography ==
=== Albums ===
Studio albums

- 1957: Guy Béart (or Qu'on est bien)
- 1958: Guy Béart Volume 2 (or L'Eau vive)
- 1960: Guy Béart Volume 3 (or Printemps sans amour)
- 1963: Guy Béart Volume 4 (or Fille d'aujourd'hui)
- 1965: Qui suis-je? (or Les grands principes)
- 1966: Vive la rose - Les très vieilles chansons de France
- 1968: La Vérité
- 1968: V'là l'joli vent - Les nouvelles très vieilles chansons de France
- 1969: La Fenêtre
- 1971: L'Espérance folle
- 1973: Couleurs du temps
- 1975: Il fait beau à Paris (compilation with previously unreleased materials)
- 1976: Chansons de notre temps et d'espérance
- 1977: Futur- Fiction- Fantastique (compilation with unreleased materials)
- 1978: Les Nouvelles Chansons
- 1981: Le beau miroir
- 1982: Porte-bonheur - Les chansons gaies des belles années
- 1986: Demain je recommence
- 1995: Il est temps
- 2010: Le Meilleur des choses

Live albums

- 1974: À l'université (double album)
- 1977: À la Comédie des Champs-Élysées (triple album)
- 1999: En public (double CD)

Compilation albums

- 2010: Best of (triple CD)
- 2014: Chansons éternelles de France

=== Songs ===
(Alphabetical order)

- À Amsterdam (1976)
- À côté (1971)
- À la claire fontaine (1968)
- Ah ! quelle journée (1974)
- Allô... tu m'entends (1965)
- Alphabet (1963)
- Anachroniques (1967)
- Amour passant (2010)
- Années-lumière (1967)
- Assez (1978)
- Au bout du chemin (1962)
- Aux marches du palais (1966)
- Bagatelle-Puteaux (1975)
- Bal chez Temporel (1958)
- Battez-les (1960)
- Belle harmonie (1976)
- Bête à rêver (1971)
- Blanche biche (1968)
- Bonne année bonne chance (avec Dominique Dimey, 1980)
- Brave marin (1966)
- C'est après que ça se passe (1973)
- Ça n'va guère (1968)
- Ça pourra s'arranger (2010)
- Ça qu'est bien (2010)
- Caroline (1982)
- Carthagène (1964)
- Ce n'est pas parce que (1969)
- Cercueil à roulettes (1965)
- Ceux qui s'aiment (1972)
- Chahut-bahut (1969)
- Chandernagor (1958)
- Chanson pour ma vieille (1958)
- Cinéma (1963)
- Combien je t'aime (1981)
- Comme les autres font (1968)
- Contrebandier du ciel
- Couleurs (1968)
- Da roghi
- Dans les journaux (1963)
- Dans regrettable (1958)
- De la lune qui se souvient ? (1965)
- Demain je recommence (1986)
- Disparaît (1995)
- Dominique (1986)
- Douce (1963)
- Émile s'en fout (1986)
- En baignoire (1960)
- En marchant (1969)
- En marge (1971)
- En revenant de la revue (1982; remake of Delormel & Garnier/Desormes, 1886, created by Paulus)
- Encore un été (1963)
- Entre chien et loup (1969)
- Entre-temps ramait d'Aboville (1992)
- Escalier B (1969)
- Et moi je m'enfoui-foui (1966)
- Et puisqu'en tout cas on est malheureux (1965)
- Étoiles, garde-à-vous (1968)
- Feuille vole (1965)
- Fille d'aujourd'hui (1963)
- Flani-flânons (1971)
- Fleur d'épines (1968)
- Frantz (avec Marie Laforêt, 1964)
- Gentils vieillards (1973)
- Grenades grenades (1960)
- Grenouille de l'étang (1960)
- Havane (1975)
- Hôtel Dieu (1968)
- Idéologie (1978)
- Il est temps (1995)
- Il fait beau à Paris (1975)
- Il fait toujours beau quelque part (1967)
- Il faut avoir été (2010)
- Il n'y a plus d'après (1960)
- Il ne faut pas beaucoup (1995)
- Il y a plus d'un an (1958)
- Il y a si longtemps que je rôde (1965)
- J'ai mis (1969)
- J'ai retrouvé le pont du nord (1969)
- J'erre, j'erre (1976)
- Je connais une blonde (1982)
- Je me suis engagé (1968)
- Je ne sais jamais dire non (1962)
- Je vais au Burkina Faso (2010)
- Julie (1976)
- L'agent double (1958)
- L'alouette (1978)
- L'amour de moy (1966)
- L'âne (1958)
- L'autoroute en bois (1973)
- L'avenir c'était plus beau hier (1977)
- L'eau vive (1958)
- L'espérance folle (1971)
- L'histoire sans histoire (1973)
- L'ile aux jaloux (1995)
- L'insouciance des jours (1965)
- L'obélisque (1958)
- L'oxygène (1958)
- La Baya (1982)
- La belle au jardin (1968)
- La bohème (1968)
- La bombe à neu-neu (1978)
- La brave fille (1974)
- La bureaucrate (1978)
- La chabraque (1960, paroles de Marcel Aymé)
- La chaloupe à l'eau (1966)
- La dame au p'tit chien (1965)
- La danse du temps (1978)
- La fenêtre (1969)
- La fille aux yeux mauves (1971)
- La gambille (1975)
- La grève du rêve (1981)
- La guerre va chanter (1986)
- La lune est verte (1969)
- La maison tranquille (1971)
- La Mattchiche (1982)
- La même éthique (1976)
- La télé (1965)
- La tour de Babel (1992)
- La valse brune (1982)
- La vénus mathématique (1969)
- La vérité (1968)
- La vie conjugale (avec Christiane Canavese, 1964)
- La vie va (1976)
- Laine la blanche (1995)
- Laisse parler le silence (1980)
- Laura (1958)
- Le beau miroir (1981)
- Le bienfait perdu (1986)
- Le bon Zeus (1986)
- Le chapeau (1958)
- Le cœur en miettes (1973)
- Le conscrit du Languedoc (1966)
- Le fils du renard (1968)
- Le grand chambardement (1968)
- Le groupe (1971)
- Le jardin d'Elvire (1960, paroles de Marcel Aymé)
- Le mariage (1961)
- Le matin, je m'éveille en chantant (1960)
- Le meilleur des choses (2010)
- Le messie (1976)
- Le miracle vient de partout (1976)
- Le monsieur et le jeune homme (1963)
- Le mur de ma vie privée (1995)
- Le petit voeuf (1973)
- Le pont de Nantes (1966)
- Le prince fainéant (1967, paroles de Victor Hugo)
- Le quidam (1958)
- Le rendez-vous (1964)
- Le roi a fait battre tambour (1966)
- Le sesque (1973)
- Le sort des matelots (1966)
- Le terrien (1958)
- Le train pour avant-hier (1969)
- Le trou dans le seau (avec Dominique Grange, 1965)
- Le voyageur de rayons (1968)
- Les amours tranquilles (2010)
- Les bras d'Antoine (1962)
- Les collines d'acier (1968)
- Les couleurs du temps (1973)
- Les éléphants (1958)
- Les enfants de bourgeois (1976)
- Les enfants sages (1960)
- Les enfants sur la lune (1968)
- Les fleurs de mon jardin (1971)
- Les grands principes (1965)
- Les mots (1986)
- Les parapluies (1981)
- Les pas réunis (1960)
- Les pouvoirs (1981)
- Les prénoms jolis (1995)
- Les proverbes d'aujourd'hui (1973)
- Les souliers (1965)
- Les temps étranges (1963)
- Les temps sont doux (1973)
- Les tristes noces (1966)
- Liban libre libre Liban (1989)
- Lo papel (1973)
- Lune ma banlieue (1971)
- Ma mère je le veux (1968)
- Magazines (1963)
- Mandrin (1968)
- Moitié toi moitié moi (1958)
- Mon amour mon amour (1981)
- Mon Paris (1982)
- Mou doux flou (1981)
- Mourir en vacances (1978)
- Ne tirez pas le diable (1960, paroles de Marcel Aymé)
- O Jéhovah (1986)
- On ne manque de rien (1971)
- Où sont maintenant ? (1986)
- Où vais-je ? (1978)
- Paix à la guerre (2010)
- Paris au mois d'août (1970)
- Parlez-moi d'moi (avec Jeanne Moreau, 1980)
- Parodie (1973)
- Pierrot la tendresse (1974)
- Pique sur tes ficelles (2010)
- Pleure Paule pleure (1981)
- Plus jamais (1962)
- Porte-bonheur (1982)
- Poste restante (1958)
- Printemps sans amour (1960)
- Qu'il est dur d'aimer (1995)
- Qu'on est bien (1958)
- Quand au temple (1966)
- Quand les lilas refleuriront (1982)
- Quand on aime, on a toujours raison (1969)
- Quand un homme (1962, duo avec Christiane Canavese)
- Que diable (1978)
- Que j'aime (1971)
- Qui est con ? (1995)
- Qui suis-je ? (1965)
- Retrouver l'aventure (1995)
- Rotatives (1968)
- Sac à malices (1960, duo avec Christiane Canavese))
- Saute au paf (1975)
- Seigneurs du vent (1995)
- Seine, va (1964)
- Sérénade à madame (1958)
- Ses meilleurs amis (1986)
- Si je t'ai jetée (2010)
- Si la France (1981)
- Stances à Cassandre
- Suez (1963)
- Tant de sueur humaine (1967)
- Télé Attila (2010)
- Téléphonez-moi quand même (2010)
- Tiens tiens (1971)
- Totole (1970)
- Tourbillonnaire (1976)
- Tout comme avant (1968)
- Tout finit à St-Tropez (1965)
- Trouilletulaire (1981)
- Un enfant écrit (1964)
- Une autre que toi (1978)
- V'la l'joli vent (1968)
- Vieille misère (1978)
- Viens poupoule (1982)
- Vive la rose (1966)
- Vous (1958)
- Y a pas papa (1995)

== Honors and awards ==
- Knight of the Order of Legion of Honour (1985)
- Officer of the Ordre National du Mérite (1989)
- Commander of the Ordre des Arts et des Lettres

== See also ==
- Une souris chez les hommes (film, 1964, music)
