= Bruce Alcock =

Canadian film director

Bruce Alcock is a Vancouver-based, Newfoundland-born multimedia filmmaker, creative director, and founder of animation studios Cuppa Coffee Studio (with Adam Shaheen) and Global Mechanic. Born in Corner Brook, Newfoundland, he has directed several animated short films including At The Quinte Hotel (2005), an animated film set to a 1968 CBC Radio recording of Al Purdy reading his poem Quinte Hotel. The film, which combines stop-motion and traditional animation, received the Canadian Film Institute Award for best Canadian animation at the Ottawa International Animation Festival.

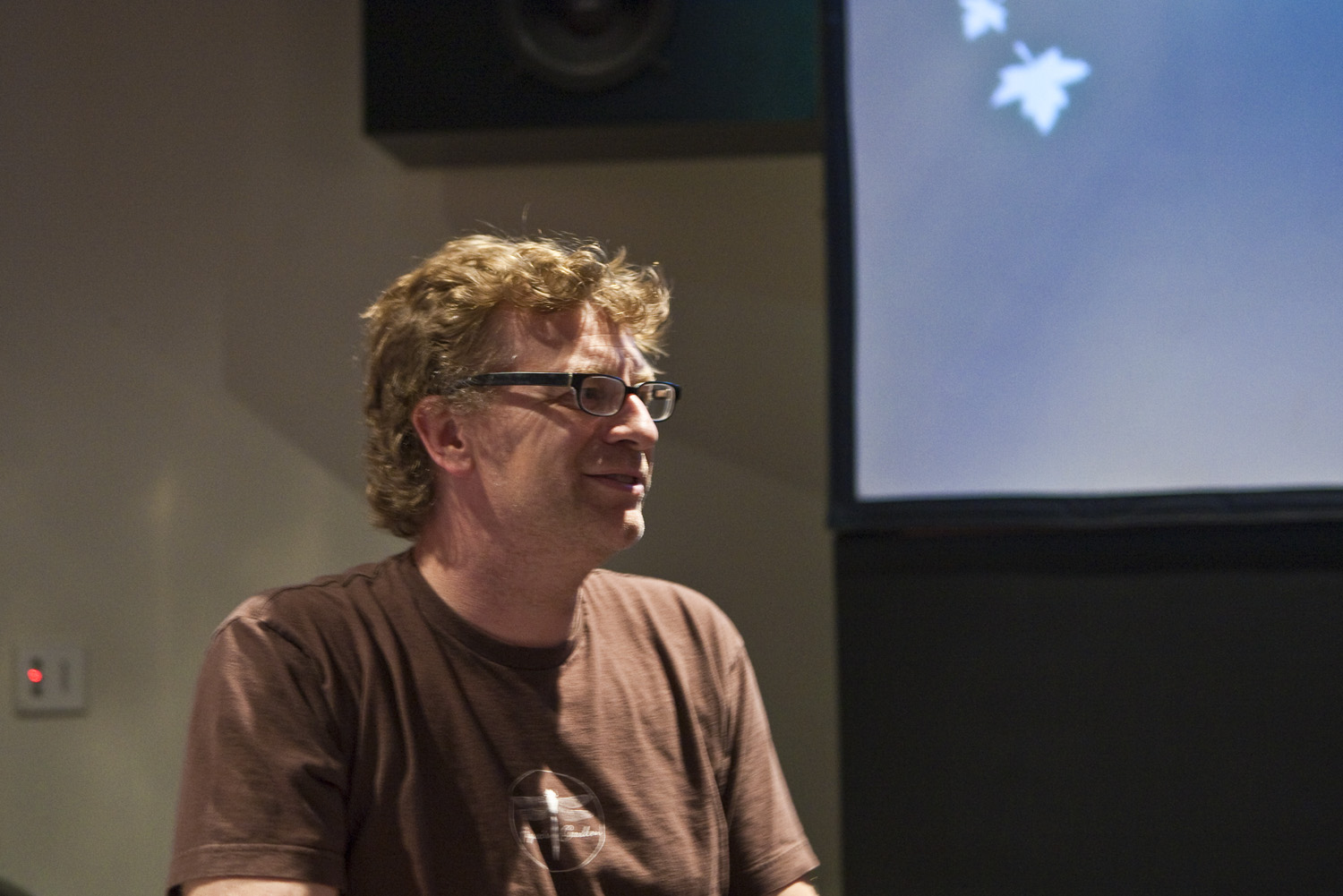
Alcock in 2010

Alcock went on to make several short films with the National Film Board of Canada: Vive la rose (2009); Impromptu (2013), nominated for the Academy of Canadian Cinema and Television Award for Best Animated Short at the 2nd Canadian Screen Awards; and the 2014 multimedia short film 54 Hours, co-directed with Paton Francis and written by Michael Crummey, produced for the 100th anniversary of the 1914 Newfoundland Sealing Disaster. Alcock has also created handmade experimental animation for on-air promotions for MuchMusic and directed numerous commercials.

Alcock was invited to France in June 2016 to present his life's animation work in advertising at The Annecy International Animated Film Festival. In celebration of the Annecy Festival's 75th anniversary, Bruce Alcock representing Global Mechanic, alongside eight other studios were featured for their contributions to animation in advertising.

== Career ==
In an interview with Roundhouse Radio, Alcock discussed his start in animation while living in Barcelona, and apprenticing with animator Dirk Van de Vondel. Alcock and Van de Vondel fortuitously met in a life drawing class, which led to Alcock helping Van de Vondel with a film. Now, as co-owner of Global Mechanic, Alcock leads an unusual and successful business model. In addition to his work in art, film and animation, Alcock has launched other business startups and spin-offs, including interactive wine tasting platform Quini. As Creative Director at Global Mechanic, Alcock's current animated projects in production include two PBS children's TV series, Ruff Ruffman and Plum Landing. Ruff Ruffman is a science-based show that stars a "foolish looking, giant orange dog" who inspires children to do "task based science projects." Plum Landing is a sustainability-based show that features an alien, who gains an understanding of the earth by sending the cast of kids on tasks throughout the show.

Throughout his career, Alcock has created an impressive body of commercial work. Alcock's design-based TV commercials "have led to award-winning campaigns for clients like Coca-Cola, Molson, Chrysler, Bell and Proctor & Gamble."

Although Alcock is known for his work on advertisements, he is also known for his work on TV shows, independent films, apps, video games and art projects.

Alcock's art projects include typographical animation for the dance/theatre/poetry/music piece, The Four Horsemen, and set and projection work for, I Send You This Cadmium Red, based on the correspondence between John Berger and John Christie.

Alcock also designed the font Soupbone, distributed by FontShop International.

== Animation studios ==
Alcock and Adam Shaheen founded Cuppa Coffee animation in 1991. In 1995, Alcock moved to Chicago to head Tricky Pictures, a subsidiary of Backyard Productions. In 2000, Alcock founded Global Mechanic in Vancouver. Since 2004 he co-owns the company with CEO Tina Ouellette.
