= Magnet (children's television block) =

Defunct American children's programming block

- Network: HBO Family
- Launched: August 26, 2001; 25 years ago
- Closed: June 2005; 21 years ago
- Country of origin: United States
- Owner: Home Box Office, Inc. (HBO)
- Sister network: Jam
- Running time: 5pm–7pm (2001–04); 1:30pm–3:30pm (2004–05)
- Original language: English

Magnet was an American children's programming block aimed at preteens that aired on HBO Family. It launched on August 26, 2001, alongside Jam, a block made for preschoolers. Until 2004, the block aired on afternoons and evenings at 5pm to 7pm every day.

== History ==
In August 2001, HBO announced the blocks "Jam" and "Magnet" for their family channel, HBO Family, both of which launched on August 26, 2001. Magnet's initial programming lineup was 30 by 30: Kid Flicks, Animated Tales of the World, Crashbox, Dear America, and The Worst Witch. Later on, Jam and HBO Family's programming were added on Magnet's lineup including The Little Lulu Show, Freshman Year, and What Matters.

In 2004, the block moved its timeslot to 1:30pm and ran until 3:30pm. Some of the programming were removed, while Crashbox and The Little Lulu Show (which also aired on Jam) remained with Crashbox expanding to a full hour. Meanwhile, Happily Ever After: Fairy Tales for Every Child, which originally aired on Jam, moved to Magnet around this time. By late 2004, the block discontinued the "Magnet" branding, leaving it unbranded. In June 2005, the block was entirely removed from HBO Family's lineup. Some programs that aired on Magnet, including Animated Tales of the World, Crashbox, and Happily Ever After: Fairy Tales for Every Child, were moved to Jam (later HBO Kids); while Animated Tales of the World aired until 2008, Crashbox and Happily Ever After remained on Jam/HBO Kids until its closure on February 29, 2024. The block's parent channel HBO Family closed on August 15, 2025.

== Programming ==
=== Shows ===
- A History of US
- 30 by 30: Kid Flicks (August 26, 2001 – 2004)
- Animated Tales of the World
- Crashbox (August 26, 2001 – 2005)
- Dear America
- Freshman Year
- Happily Ever After: Fairy Tales for Every Child (2004–05)
- The Adventures of Tintin
- The Little Lulu Show (2002–05)
- The Worst Witch (August 27, 2001 – 2004)
- What Matters

=== Short-form programming ===
- 30 by 30: Short Spots
- Buzzwatt
- Frog Blues
- HBO Family: 411
- The Booth in The Back
- The Way I See It
- Yuk
