= Global Mechanic =

Canadian animation studio

- Type: Subsidiary
- Industry: Animation
- Founded: 2000
- Founder: Bruce Alcock
- Headquarters: Vancouver, British Columbia, Canada
- Key people: Bruce Alcock (CEO)
- Owner: Kadan Animation
- Parent: Kadan Group
- Website: www.globalmechanic.com

Global Mechanic Media is a Canadian animation studio headquartered in Vancouver, British Columbia, Canada. It is known for creating various digital and traditional media, feature and short films, television series, commercials, games, installations, interactive experiences, titles, and original photography using many different techniques. Global Mechanic was founded in 2000 by Creative Director, Bruce Alcock and is currently owned with his wife, CEO Tina Ouellette. Specialties include animation, branding and design.

== Notable works ==
- Birdgirl (season 2)
- Phred on Your Head Show
- Dirty Singles
- A Sweet Story
- Sir Bit
- All Terrain Brain
- Avery Matthews
- The Brothers Pistov
- Dumb Ways to Die
- FETCH! with Ruff Ruffman
- Harvey Birdman, Attorney at Law
- Spang Ho
- I Am Poem! (intro)
- Wrong Number Phone Message
- Vive la rose
- At the Quinte Hotel
- Plum Landing

== Commercials ==
- Rachis "Opening Wine" (2013)
- Smirnoff "Rocket Scientist", "Rocket", "Smirnoff BBQ", "Smirnoff Cottage" (2012)
- OLG "Play OLG" (2012)
- The Globe and Mail "More Life" (2011)
- VANOC "Connections", "Richmond Oval", "Sustainability", "Athletes Village" (2010)
- The Bay "Threads", "Making Of"
- Silk "Banana", "Boobs", "Brain", "Carrots", "Gum", "Penny", "Rice", "Shaving", "Spiders", "Turkey"
- BC Hydro "Powersmart"
- Plan Canada "Because I am a Girl"
- Nokia "Fits You", "Making Of"
- Coca-Cola "Character", "Bubbles", "Coke Geniuser", "Friends", "Coke Summer", "Yebo", "Language", "Radio"
- Holland America Line "You? Dancing?" (2004)
- Chili's "Postcards" (2002)
- Noggin "Nickelodeon Block Open" (2000)
- Noggin "One & Only" (1999)
- Phred on Your Head Show (opening) (1999)
- Kraft Foods "Rocket Science/No-Brainer" (1998)
- Animal Planet "Holiday ID's" (1998)
- Locomotion "Galactica" (1998)
- Reese's Puffs "Dragon" (1997)
- Coca-Cola "Friends" (1997)
- Cartoon Network "Blocks/Soup" (1996)
- Coca-Cola "Hangin' Out" (1996)
- Nickelodeon "Snick Snack" (1995)
