= Crashbox =

Canadian-American educational children's television series (1999–2000)

- Title card
- Genre: Variety; Science fiction
- Created by: John Watkin; Eamon Harrington
- Directed by: Dave Thomas
- Voices of: Jerry Stiller; Maggie Baird; Veena Bidasha; S. Scott Bullock; Greg Eagles; Joseph Motiki; Arif S. Kinchen; Peter Lurie; Dawn Maxey; Edie McClurg; Michael McShane; Ritchie Montgomery; Alan Schlaifer; John Watkin; Mari Weiss; Danny Wells
- Theme music composer: Matthew Morse
- Composer: Matthew Morse
- Countries of origin: Canada; United States
- Original language: English
- No. of seasons: 2
- No. of episodes: 52

Production
- Executive producers: Adam Shaheen; John Watkin; Eamon Harrington; Dolores Morris; Sheila Nevins
- Producers: John Watkin; Eamon Harrington; Marlene Schmidt
- Production locations: Toronto, Ontario, Canada; Malibu, California
- Camera setup: Single-Camera
- Running time: 24–30 minutes
- Production companies: Planet Grande Pictures; Cuppa Coffee Animation

Original release
- Network: HBO Family
- Release: February 1, 1999 – April 1, 2000

Crashbox is a stop-motion animated edutainment children's television series co-created by Eamon Harrington and John Watkin for HBO Family that ran from 1999 to 2000 in the United States. It was HBO's second series (their first being Braingames 15 years earlier) focusing on educational skits.

Crashbox was one of the original programs for the relaunch of the HBO Family channel in February 1999. Although it has never been released on physical media like DVD or VHS, it was consistently rerun on HBO Family until the removal of its children's block in 2025 and is found on various streaming services.

== Production ==
Crashbox was created and produced by Planet Grande Pictures (consisting of John Watkin and Eamon Harrington) and is animated by Cuppa Coffee Studios, headed by Adam Shaheen. Planet Grande Pictures engaged Cuppa Coffee Studios for 8 months to complete 13 hours of programming. Some of the segments produced for Season 1 were reused for the first half of Season 2, while production of the second half went underway in late 1999.

Along with the 52 aired episodes, it has been stated that a total of 65 episodes were at one point produced/planned, as mentioned during a demo reel for Planet Grande Pictures. Most sources state that only 52 episodes were produced, and only 52 episodes have been registered in the Library of Congress.

== Premise ==
The show takes place in the insides of a game computer where green game cartridges (which are sculpted out of clay) are created and loaded by rusty tin robots, occasionally with short sketches of them "repairing" damaged games. The format of each episode is The Electric Company-esque, with sketches not connecting nor following a sequential plot. Each half-hour episode consists of seven or eight 1-to-5-minute educational games, each covering topics like history, math, and science.

== Segments ==
The following are the games of the show listed in alphabetical order:

- Captain Bones: A pirate skeleton named Captain Bones has the viewers solve math problems, picture puzzles, and math riddles by having his bones form the equation or picture, often having the viewers move a limited number of his bones to pull it off. Throughout the game, Captain Bones will openly mock and demean the viewers using several pirate-esque insults, eventually becoming so irate that he blurts out the answer in rage.
- Dirty Pictures: In an art museum that is closed for cleaning, a maid dusts off a picture with a wooden "Old Fossil" guard holding up cards that give the hints of the person in the dusty painting. Once the main painting and name plate are dusted off, one last comment is shown by the Old Fossil before the museum doors close, ending the game. The maid only speaks through indistinct mutters, although the Old Fossil often mutters what's on his cards in Season 2.
- Distraction News: A cardboard-cutout, blonde-haired anchorwoman named Dora Smarmy provides informative news segments while distractive images (some of which from other games) appear during the broadcast. The object is to see how well the viewers were able to remember key facts from the broadcast without being distracted.
- Ear-We-Are*: Two ears describe sounds to each other for the viewers to guess the event or place to which they are flying travelling.
- Eddie Bull: Zookeeper Eddie Bull gives viewers a number of hints to what animal at the Walla Walla Washington Zoo ate him. Once the animal is identified, Eddie is regurgitated, and the game then ends.
- Haunted House Party: A haunted house party hosted by the unseen Horrid One has ghosts attend as the viewer must identify the mystery guest of honor by listening to clues said about them, often accompanied by the butler or other party guests. When all the clues have been said, the Horrid One recaps them to the viewers before the historical figure is revealed in cardboard cutout form after a bright flash of lightning.
- Lens McCracken*: A noir comic-styled segment features the titular near-sighted detective, Lens McCracken, develop pictures for a case he's working on. His camera lens is broken, however, resulting in zoomed-in and blurry pictures that the viewers must figure out what they're supposed to be. A stumped Lens then feeds the photos to his dark-room contraption, the Solutionator, and ends the segment by piecing together a nonsensical story from the zoomed-out photos. This is the only segment to be featured in Season 2A not to have new segments produced for Season 2B.
- Mugshots: Also referred to as "Mug Shots" in the game's title card; Detective Verity Wisenheimer has the viewers look at the interrogated testimony from four photographed suspects of a crime where they must find out who is telling the truth and which three of them are lying as they each state where they were when the crime was happening. The viewer solves the puzzle by spotting the contradictions or factual inaccuracies in each suspect's testimonies. Each of the suspects are played by live-action people. When the innocent suspect is identified, the game ends.
- Paige and Sage*: Paige and Sage, the segment's namesakes, are two identical twins, represented by Mattel doll-lookalikes. The game features the girls hanging out at two versions of a given location, with the player being asked to spot 10 differences between Paige (left) and Sage's (right) side of the screen in the span of 60 seconds. A valley girl narrates the segment, and recaps the differences while poking fun at the twins, or pointing out strange characters and scenarios in the pictures.
- Poop or Scoop: A purple carnival ringmaster gives four facts about animals, and the viewers must guess whether they are true or false.
- Psycho Math: A hot-headed robot named Professor Rocket gives the viewers long math problems for them to solve with countable pictures or descriptions of numbered things, such as the number of members on a baseball team qualifying for the number "9".
- Radio Scramble*: A talking microphone DJ nicknamed Jumpin' Johnnie Jumble (based on Wolfman Jack) has the viewers unscramble a word that is the title of the song that he plays at the KBOX radio station. He will sometimes also deliver traffic (as Captain Copter), commercials, sports (as Billy Bull), or weather reports (as April Showers) that also are anagram puzzles.
- Revolting Slob: A documentary-esque puppet sketch where a polite female voice uses the Revolting Slob (a slovenly manchild with several disgusting habits) to describe three three-choice answer vocabulary questions. The sketch ends with a word, typically related to destruction or explosions, resulting in the Revolting Slob exploding, followed by the polite voice mentioning "No slobs were harmed in the filming of this show." In Season 1, the Revolting Slob is bad-tempered, grumpy, and gluttonous, and the segment takes place in his living room. But in Season 2, the Revolting Slob is eccentric and exuberant, and the segment takes place in his kitchen. Each segment revolves around a revolting or strange event performed by the Revolting Slob.
- Riddlesnake*: An unseen Asian raj reads the riddles from the pungi-playing Riddlesnake that the viewers must solve. The Riddlesnake charms a man, who blows a kazoo, revealing the answer to the riddle. This segment is typically played as the final game in most episodes.
- Sketch Pad: A beatnik named Sketch Pad draws pictures of scenarios where something seemingly doesn't make sense. The goal of the game is to try to guess the event or outcome that would make the story make sense.
- Ten 2nds*: A supercomputer gives the viewers ten seconds to solve each of four or five rebus puzzles (depending on the season) and guess the answer. At the end of the game, the announcer signs off, ending the game.
- Think Tank: Inside a fish tank, a Jamaican submarine captain named Cap'n Bob (loosely based on Bob Marley) tells the viewers to figure out what each set of three things that appears have in common before the water in his tank drains. This game closes the final episode of Season 2, serving as the final segment played in the series.
- Wordshake*: Also referred to as "Word Shake" in the game's title card; Chef Pierre, an artificially intelligent French-American chef (as shown in a nickelodeon machine modeled like a Chef), demonstrates two-to-four letters, words or phrases that are to be used by the viewers to combine into one word or phrase, such as the letters "D" and "K" to form "decay" and the words "disturb" and "honey" to make "the Easter Bunny". The sketch usually ends with Chef Pierre racing across the kitchen as it explodes with flour, before falling over.

Near the end of each episode, the closing segment "Crashbox Rewind" takes place, where the robots rewind through certain segments (typically four or five) to showcase what the viewers have learned. The seven segments marked with an asterisk (*) are never played during Rewind. At least two-to-four of these segments appear in every episode (only in Season 1).

== Cast ==
Major voice cast
Segment	Character	Actor			
Factory, Cafeteria, Maintenance	Robots	Jerry Stiller (dropped), Tim Gedemer (uncredited)			
Captain Bones	Captain Bones	S. Scott Bullock			
Dirty Pictures	Cleaning Maid	Maggie Baird (uncredited)			
Dirty Pictures	Old Fossil	Greg Eagles (uncredited)			
Distraction News	Dora Smarmy	Mari Weiss			
Ear-We-Are	Left Ear	John Watkin			
Ear-We-Are	Right Ear	Alan Schlaifer			
Eddie Bull	Eddie Bull	Ritchie Montgomery			
Haunted House Party	Horrid One	John Watkin			
Haunted House Party	Butler	Alan Schlaifer			
Lens McCracken	Lens McCracken	S. Scott Bullock			
Mugshots	Detective Verity Wisenheimer	Maggie Baird			
Paige and Sage	Valley Girl	Dawn Maxey			
Poop or Scoop	Announcer	Danny Wells			
Psycho Math	Professor Rocket	Joseph Motiki (Season 1/2A; uncredited), Arif S. Kinchen (Season 2B)			
Radio Scramble	Jumpin' Johnnie Jumble	Peter Lurie			
Ear-We-Are	Left Ear	-	Psycho Math	Professor Rocket	Joseph Motiki (Season 1/2A; uncredited), Arif S. Kinchen (Season 2B)
Ear-We-Are	Revolting Slob	Polite Female Voice	Edie McClurg		
Revolting Slob	Revolting Slob	Mike McShane			
Riddlesnake	Riddlesnake Raj	Veena Bidasha			
Sketch Pad	Sketch Pad	Greg Eagles			
Ten 2nds	Announcer	Alan Schlaifer			
Think Tank	Captain Bob	Greg Eagles			
Wordshake	Chef Pierre	John Watkin			

== Seasons ==
=== Season 1 ===
The first season of Crashbox premiered on HBO Family on February 1, 1999. The first seven episodes aired throughout the first week of February. The remaining 19 episodes aired on weekends, typically in batches of twos, with Episode 26 closing the season on April 17.

=== Season 2 ===
The first half of Crashbox's second season first premiered on HBO Family with Episode 27, which aired on August 1, 1999. The twelve other episodes of Season 2A premiered on weekends in batches of twos up until September 12.

Segments from the first half of Season 2 reuse select segments from Season 1, with the games "Ear-We-Are", "Wordshake", and "Paige and Sage" being dropped from the game lineup. Lens McCracken is featured in Season 2A, but would later be dropped for Season 2B.

The second half of Season 2 premiered on February 19, 2000, with Episode 40; Crashbox 41 premiered the following day. Episodes 42-51 aired on the following weekdays in batches of twos, with Episode 52 airing on April 1, 2000, serving as the series' final episode.

Distinctly, Episodes 43, 45, 48, and 50 were produced in 1999 (as seen in their credits), in contrast to the rest of Season 2B, which was produced in 2000.

== Interstitial spinoffs ==
Alongside its series premiere in 1999, two interstitial series were aired on HBO Family. "Smart Mouth", featuring Dora Smarmy from "Distraction News", has her stating unusual vocabulary words (not too dissimilar to Revolting Slob) with personal experiences. "Who Knew?", featuring Professor Rocket from "Psycho Math", features him talking about strange facts and trivia.

Both series have 80 episodes each, and aired on HBO Family, Magnet from 2001 to 2005, Jam from 2005 to 2016, and during movie breaks. Both series were removed from syndication following the HBO Kids rebrand in 2016, and only a few episodes survive to this day.

== Syndication ==
Starting in 2001, HBO Family launched two TV blocks marketed towards kids; Jam, which was marketed towards a younger, preschool demographic, and Magnet, which was marketed to an older, middle school-aged audience. Crashbox, alongside its associated interstitial spin-off series, Who Knew? and Smart Mouth, aired on the Magnet block up until it was discontinued in 2005.

Crashbox retroactively joined the Jam block in 2005, even though the show was marketed towards a TV-Y7 audience compared to the mainly preschool-oriented programming recently airing on the block. The show aired routinely on the block up until 2016, where the block was rebranded to HBO Kids. The show premiered on the new block a day after the rebrand, on January 18, 2016, and was moved to the afternoon along with The Electric Company for weekdays.

Crashbox 14 served as the series' premiere on HBO Kids, with the rest of Season 1 airing on weekdays up until February 22, 2016. Episodes 27-37 were skipped after Episode 26 premiered, while Episodes 38-52 premiered on the block as usual. Episode 1 first aired on March 15, 2016, with the rest of Season 1 following it. Season 1 then aired again up to two times until Season 2B returned to the schedule in July.

Following the removal of various Sesame Workshop shows, Crashbox was moved to an early morning timeslot a few years later and aired routinely on the channel until 2024.

=== Removed episodes ===
Following the 2016 rebrand of HBO Family's preschool block, Jam, to HBO Kids, Crashbox aired most of its first season in the afternoon (skipping Crashbox 1 in favor of Crashbox 14). Episodes 27–37 were skipped after Episode 26 premiered. Only Episodes 38 and 39 were ever aired on the HBO Kids block. The last times Episodes 27–37 aired was on Jam from January 4 to January 8, 2016.

Episodes 27–39 have not aired on the channel since February 2016. The episodes are not available on most of HBO's digital or streaming services, including HBO Now, HBO Go, and HBO Max; HBO has opted not to add the episodes onto the latter service due to the repeated segments used from the first season. As of 2023, Canadian streamer Crave is currently the only site that features all of Season 2 (erroneously listed as part of Season 1), including Episodes 27–39.

Most sources pre–HBO Kids, such as HBO's various streaming services, promos for said episodes, and most TV guides, list Episodes 27–39 of Crashbox as part of Season 2. In following years, the removed episodes were sometimes grouped with Season 1, despite being produced for Season 2; notable examples include Crave and JioCinema. Besides the aforementioned services, most official HBO sources (before the removal of these episodes) considered these removed episodes as part of Season 2.

== Reception ==
The series received generally positive reviews from audiences and parents on Common Sense Media, with a 4 out of 5 star rating.
