= Cuppa Coffee Studios =

Canadian animation studio

- Logo used since 2006
- Formerly: Cuppa Coffee Animation (1992–2006)
- Industry: Animation
- Founded: December 14, 1992; 33 years ago in Toronto, Ontario
- Founder: Adam Shaheen; Bruce Alcock
- Headquarters: Toronto, Ontario, Canada
- Divisions: Cuppa Coffee Studios USA
- Website: www.cuppacoffee.com

Cuppa Coffee Studios (formerly known as Cuppa Coffee Animation) was a Canadian production company formerly headquartered in Toronto, Ontario. The company relocated to Los Angeles, California. Cuppa Coffee was founded by Adam Shaheen and Bruce Alcock in 1992. It specialized in both stop-motion animation and 2D animation, winning over 150 international awards. Cuppa Coffee is currently developing live-action content through Cuppa Coffee USA.

== History ==
By late 1992, Adam Shaheen had worked on several editorial assignments, book jackets and CD covers, but he wanted to create a unique animation style mixing photographic, collage and illustration techniques. In December, he founded Cuppa Coffee Animation with Bruce Alcock, and Steve Hillman joined the company shortly after. Cuppa Coffee's first projects were network IDs and show opens for MuchMusic and a commercial for Fruity Pebbles. In March 1993, Cuppa Coffee was featured on Citytv's MediaTelevision program; the interview expanded a campaign for Molson's Black Ice which exhibited their unique mixed-media animation. Bruce Alcock moved to Chicago in 1995 to start Tricky Pictures, Backyard Productions' animation subsidiary. In February 1996, Cuppa Coffee began producing live-action, starting with three spots for Molson Ultra. In 1997, Cuppa Coffee launched Sargent York, a short-lived arm of the company that would work on longer-form content like "The Adventures of Sam Digital in the 21st Century", an award-winning short film for Nickelodeon. In the late 1990s, Cuppa Coffee produced the HBO Family series Crashbox and other shorter projects for the network, the CBS Christmas special Snowden's Christmas, and pilots for Nickelodeon and Cartoon Network.

In 2001, Cuppa Coffee Animation started development on three series for children: Cinema Sue, Ted's Bed and Gordon Giraffe. The following year, Broadway Video Enterprises agreed to distribute the three series, but none of them went into production. In 2004, Cuppa Coffee launched Decaf Distribution as it started producing its own content. In 2005, the short series Bruno aired on Noggin and international Nickelodeon channels, and AWOL Animation agreed to distribute the short series Tigga and Togga and Bruno and the Banana Bunch, a long-form series based on the Bruno interstitials. Cuppa Coffee was also going to co-produce Captain Mack with Kickback Media, but the completed series was produced by Fireback Entertainment instead.

In September 2009, Gordon Ramsay signed a prime time animation deal with Cuppa Coffee Studios, who began working on the series Gordon Ramsay, At Your Service, which was never completed. In 2010, Cuppa Coffee Studios added 30 stages and 30,000 square feet to its Toronto studios. Cuppa Coffee launched Saucer Sound that year and Lemon Squeezy Interactive in 2011. Cuppa Coffee developed other animated projects throughout the 2010s that never went into production, including a show based on Polybank Designs' Pets Rock licensing brand in 2017. The studio opened Cuppa Coffee Studios USA in 2018 and is developing live action dramas. Only the American studio is currently active as the website was redirected to Cuppa Coffee Studios USA.

== List of productions by Cuppa Coffee Studios ==
- Crashbox (1999–2000) (52x30 episodes) (Note: This was the studio's first television series.)
- Little People (1999–2005) (co-production with Egmont Imagination, Fisher-Price and Wreckless Abandon Studios)
- Snowden's Christmas (1999)
- The Cartoon Cartoon Show ("Trevor!") (2000)
- Henry's World (2002–2004) (co-production with Family Channel, Alliance Atlantis and TV-Loonland AG)
- JoJo's Circus (2003–2007) (co-production with Cartoon Pizza for Playhouse Disney)
- The Wrong Coast (2004) (26x11 episodes) (co-production with Curious Pictures)
- Bruno (2005) (50x1 episodes)
- A Very Barry Christmas (2005)
- Celebrity Deathmatch (2006–2007)
- Feeling Good with JoJo (2006–2008) (co-production with Cartoon Pizza for Playhouse Disney)
- Starveillance (2007)
- Bruno and the Banana Bunch (2007)
- Rick & Steve: The Happiest Gay Couple in All the World (2007–2009)
- Life's a Zoo (2008) (20x22 episodes)
- A Miser Brothers' Christmas (2008)
- Nerdland (2009) (pilot)
- Glenn Martin, DDS (2009–2011) (40x22 episodes)
- Ugly Americans (2010–2012)
- The Devil's Due (2011) (short film)
- Archetype Me (2013) (short film)
- Dodie in Oz (2013) (short film)
- Fordtacular Spectacular! (2013) (short film)
- Trump Unhinged (2016) (web shorts)

=== Other work ===
| Title | Year(s) | Notes | Client |
|---|---|---|---|
| French Kiss; The Wedge; Word Up | 1993 | openings | MuchMusic |
| Married Life | 1995 | opening | Atlantis Films |
| Fast Track | 1997 | opening | Alliance |
| Short Films by Short People | 1997 | "The Adventures of Sam Digital in the 21st Century" | Nickelodeon |
| HBO Family 411; Who Knew? Smart Mouth | 1999 | interstitial series | HBO Family |
| I Am Poem | 1999 | "Running" | Nickelodeon |
| Existenz | 1999 | title sequence | Alliance Atlantis |
| Random Play | 1999 | opening and bumpers | VH1 |
| Super Why! | 1999 | pilot | Nick Jr. Productions |
| Exhale | 2000 | opening | Oxygen |
| This Week in Baseball | 2000 | three "Mini Mel" interstitials | Major League Baseball |
| I Was a Rat | 2001 | title sequence | Catalyst Entertainment |
| Spider | 2002 | title design | Artists Independent Network |
| True Outdoor Adventures | 2002 | opening | ESPN |
| Zeyda and the Hitman | 2004 | title design | Miracle Pictures |
| Going Down | 2004 | music video | The Illuminati |
| The Newsroom | 2005 | "Learning to Fly" | |
| Rapture | 2006 | music video | Capitol Records |
| Eastern Promises | 2007 | title design | Focus Features |
| Lewis Black's Root of All Evil | 2008 | opening | Comedy Central |
| Less Than Kind | 2008 | opening | Breakthrough Entertainment |
| Junk Raiders | 2009 | opening, bumpers, and show elements | Proper TV |
| It's Always Sunny in Philadelphia | 2009 | "A Very Sunny Christmas" | FX Productions |
| From Spain with Love with Annie Sibonney | 2011 | animation and graphics | Shaftesbury Films |
| A Dangerous Method | 2011 | title design | Recorded Picture Company |
| Cosmopolis | 2012 | title design | Prospero Pictures |
| Sesame Street | 2010–2014 | eight short sequences | Sesame Workshop |
| Open Heart | 2012 | title design | Urban Landscapes |
| Maps to the Stars | 2014 | title design | Prospero Pictures |
| Killjoys | 2016 | opening | Temple Street Productions |
| Jane the Virgin | 2016 | "Chapter Forty-Seven" (animated sequence) | CBS Television Studios |

=== Commercials ===
- A&E (2008)
- American Greetings (2000)
- Bell Canada (1996)
- Benadryl
- The Bessies (1996)
- Brisk (2011)
- Canadian National Railway (2006)
- Cartoon Network (1996, 2002-2004, 2007-2008)
- Coca-Cola (1997)
- Coke Zero China (2008)
- Crystal Coast (2006)
- Cult Network Italia (1998)
- Del Monte Canada (2006)
- Disney Channel (1997)
- Electrical Safety Authority (2016)
- ESPN2 (1997)
- ESPY Awards (2007)
- Free the Dog (2007)
- Fruity Pebbles
- Geo Metro/Geo Tracker (1995)
- Get A Load of Milk (2008)
- Global Kids TV (1994)
- Gospel Music Channel (2004-2006)
- Harris Bank (1997)
- HBO Family (1999)
- HP (2008)
- IMAX - ridefilm safety video (1995)
- !ndigo (2012)
- Jack FM
- KTVX (late 1990s)
- Leon's (2013)
- Lifetime (2001)
- Lipton Canada (2006)
- Logic Communications (2006)
- Mini Ritz Scuba (2004)
- Ministry of Transportation of Ontario (2013)
- Molson Brewery (1993, 1996-1997)
- The Movie Channel 2 (1999)
- MTV Networks International (2003)
- MuchMusic (1993)
- MusiquePlus
- The N (2003)
- NBA
- Nescafé Instant (mid-1990s)
- Nickelodeon - "SNICK Snack" opening and closing (1995)
- Nickelodeon Magazine (1996)
- Nissan Almera (2003)
- Ontario Place (2011)
- Oreo (1997)
- Ottawa International Animation Festival
- Oxygen (2006)
- PAM
- Panasonic Shockwave (1995)
- PBS Kids (2003)
- Planet in Focus (2004)
- Playboy TV (1998)
- ProSieben (1997)
- RBC Insurance (2014)
- RobecoSAM
- S.C. Johnson
- Scream Awards (2007/2008)
- Service Ontario (2011)
- Shoppers Drug Mart (1995)
- Showcase (1997)
- The New TNN/Spike TV (2002-2003)
- Sprite (2006)
- Toronto Arts Foundation (1996)
- Toronto Short Film Festival
- Turner Classic Movies - "TCM Imports" open (1996) and "Films on Film" open (1997)
- Teletoon (1997)
- Telus
- Tim Hortons
- Toyota (2006/2007)
- Trimark Mutual Funds (1997)
- TSN (1997)
- WNBA (1997)
- Xbox 360
