= Shōnen Ninja Kaze no Fujimaru =

Japanese anime television series

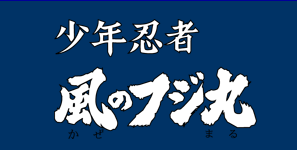
- Also known as: Fujimaru of the Wind: The Childhood of a Ninja
- Directed by: Daisaku Shirakawa; Kimio Yabuki
- Music by: Koichi Fukube; Kouichi Hattori
- Country of origin: Japan
- Original language: Japanese
- No. of episodes: 65

Production
- Production company: Toei Animation

Original release
- Network: NET
- Release: 7 June 1964 – 31 August 1965

Fujimaru of the Wind: The Childhood of a Ninja (Japanese: 少年忍者風のフジ丸, Hepburn: Shōnen Ninja Kaze no Fujimaru), also known as Samurai Kid, is a Japanese anime series produced by Toei Animation. 65 episodes aired from 7 June 1964 until 31 August 1965. It tells the story of a ninja's pupil that controlled the wind.

It was based on the manga Ishimaru of the Wind (風の石丸, Kaze no Ishimaru) by Sanpei Shirato and was animated by Yasuji Mori and Hayao Miyazaki. The anime was renamed "Kaze no Fujimaru" in order to associate it with its sponsor, Fujisawa Pharmaceuticals.

The opening theme, 'Shōnen Ninja Kaze no Fujimaru' and the closing theme, 'Tatakau Shōnen Ninja', were both performed by the Nishirokugo Boy's Choir (西六郷少年合唱団, Nishirokugō Shōnen Gasshōdan). The series originally ended with a repeat of the opening; the separate ending song came later.

== Plot summary ==
The story begins when Fujimaru is a little baby. His mother puts him in a basket while she works in the country. Suddenly, the baby is kidnapped by an eagle, but Sasuke, a samurai, recovers the baby and takes him as a disciple.

Fujimaru grows until he becomes a gifted young man who can control the wind by learning ninjutsu. He knows two strong techniques: 'multiplication' (which allows him to confuse his enemies by creating illusions of himself) and 'leaves' (which helps him to run away behind a wind swirl).

Fujimaru has two goals: to see his mother again and to find the 'Ryuen Book', a handwritten parchment that contains great but dangerous techniques. Fujimaru's main enemy is Japusai, a master of fire techniques who is also searching for the parchment.

In the end, Fujimaru attains both goals: he runs into his mother and finds the parchment, but he decides to destroy it because it would be too dangerous in Japusai's hands.
