= Antoinette Spolar =

American actress

Antoinette Spolar is an American actress who is best known for playing the role of Larry David's receptionist in the television comedy of errors Curb Your Enthusiasm. She has made many guest appearances on shows such as Friends and Cow and Chicken. She was also an impersonator on animated series Invader Zim that voiced a few background characters, notably Jessica. The celebrities she impersonated were Haylie Duff, Sheryl Crow, and Edie McClurg.
