= USS Magnet =

USS Magnet has been the name of more than one United States Navy ship, and may refer to:

- USS Magnet (SP-563), a patrol vessel in commission from 1917 to 1919
- USS Magnet (AM-260), a minesweeper in commission from 1944 to 1945
- USS Magnet (YDG-9), originally USS YDG-9, later ADG-9, a degaussing vessel in commission from 1944 to 1946
