= Vive la rose =

18th-century French folk song

Song
- Released: 18th-century
- Genre: French folk
- Songwriter: Traditional

Vive la rose is an 18th-century French folk song about unrequited love. "Mon ami me délaisse" is roughly translated as "My boyfriend dumped me". The song goes on to explain that he has found a new girlfriend. Another verse says that rumor has it that she is sick. The narrator says that if she dies, he will probably want to come back to her, but she will not have him. The chorus "Vive la rose et le lilas" means "Long live the rose and the lilac."

Vive la rose was Émile Benoît's last recording. It was interpreted by several other musicians; one such interpretation was referred to as "une vieille chanson française interprétée par la suite par Guy Béart pour les enfants". It was interpreted by Guy Béart (1960), Cora Vaucaire (1975), Nana Mouskouri (1978), Mes souliers sont rouges (2000), and Ten Strings and a Goat Skin (2013). Other names for the song include "Mon amant me délaisse" and "La méchante."

== Film adaptation ==
In 2009, Benoit's rendition of the song was adapted as a National Film Board of Canada mixed media short film by Bruce Alcock. The film was named to the Toronto International Film Festival's year-end Canada's Top Ten list for 2009, and was a Genie Award nominee for the Best Animated Short at the 30th Genie Awards.
