= Magnet, California =

Magnet
- Former settlement
- Location in California
- Coordinates: 37°09′08″N 119°39′42″W
- Country: United States
- State: California
- County: Madera
- Elevation: 1,404 ft (428 m)

Magnet is a former settlement in Madera County, California, United States. It was located 4 miles (6.4 km) northeast of O'Neals, at an elevation of 1404 feet (428 m).

A post office operated at Magnet from 1900 to 1907. The name came from the Magnet mine.
