= Due North Communications =

- Industry: Advertising
- Founded: 1993
- Headquarters: Toronto, Ontario, Canada
- Key people: Mark Weisbarth; Chief Executive Officer
- Website: Due North Communications Inc.

Due North Communications is an independent Canadian advertising agency. It was named one of Canada's 50 Best Private Managed Companies by The National Post.

== Management team ==
Due North's management team consists of Chief Executive Officer Mark Weisbarth, President Jill King, Senior Vice President, Creative Director Karen Howe, Vice President, Media Director Azim Alibhai, Vice President, Group Account Director Marianne Lawless, Vice President, Group Account Director Rob Nadler, Vice President, Social Media Hessie Jones.

== Recognition ==
Due North has received awards at the Cannes Lions International Advertising Festival, the New York Festival, the London International Advertising and Design Awards, and the Mobius Awards. In Canada Due North has been recognized by the Advertising and Design Club of Canada, the TVBs (Bessies), and The RMB Crystal Awards, The RSVP awards, the Applied Art Awards and the Marketing Awards. Due North has also received Gold at The Cassies Awards that celebrate advertising effectiveness as well as having been named one of Canada's 50 Best Private Managed Companies by The National Post.

== dial9 ==
In June 2010, Due North expanded its service offering to include digital strategy and development. dial9, a digital division of Due North, was formed. Desmond Lo, Chief Operating Officer and Dan Branco, Chief Technology Officer are principles within dial9. Soon following they acquired the services of a highly talented web interactive Art Director, Eduardo Cabral.
