= Adam Shaheen (producer) =

British designer, director, producer and writer (born 1964)

- Born: October 13, 1964 (age 61); London, England
- Education: University of the Arts London
- Occupations: Television Producer, President of Cuppa Coffee Studios, animator, screenwriter

Adam Shaheen (born 13 October 1964) is a British-Canadian artist, animator, television producer and screenwriter. He is the founder and owner of Cuppa Coffee Studios, where he developed and produced original programming. He was the executive producer of Cuppa Coffee's award-winning broadcast design and commercial studio.

== Career ==
Shaheen has produced over 400 commercials and won over 150 International awards, including 3 Gemini's/Canadian Screen Awards for his contribution to Canadian Animation and also the Prix Jeunesse, the prestigious international award given at Annecy. Shaheen is widely considered the single most awarded executive in the field of animation. In addition to his work in television, Shaheen is a published author and record producer.

In September 2017, Cuppa Coffee celebrated its 25th anniversary with Shaheen announcing "I've achieved all I've ever wanted to achieve creatively in animation and now I will put my efforts into live action." In a British interview, Shaheen cited having "achieved awards, created dozens of shows and hundreds of commercials, my talents in telling story has naturally gravitated to live action."

In 2018, Shaheen opened Cuppa Coffee USA in Los Angeles to focus on live action drama development. Shaheen is co-authoring a dramatic limited series set during World War One (Game of Lies) and a feature film set in Berlin in 1945 during World War Two. Shaheen is also the executive producer of "The Thwarting of Baron Bolligrew", a comedy which he developed from the Robert Bolt play of the same name.

=== Cuppa Coffee Studios ===
Cuppa Coffee has won awards for its film and title work, namely Jane the Virgin, Sesame Street, Much Music, MTV, Nickelodeon, Noggin, Comedy Central. David Cronenberg's Existenz, Cosmopolis, Spider, Eastern Promises, A Dangerous Method and the satirical TV series Maps to the Stars, and over 50 awards from the Broadcast Design Association and Promax.
