= Mayerling (disambiguation) =

Mayerling is a village and hunting lodge in Lower Austria.

Mayerling may also refer to:

- Mayerling incident, the mysterious deaths of Crown Prince Rudolf and his lover Baroness Maria Vetsera at the lodge in 1889, officially ruled a suicide
- Mayerling (ballet) by Sir Kenneth MacMillan (1978)
- Mayerling (1936 film), a film directed by Anatole Litvak starring Charles Boyer and Danielle Darrieux
- De Mayerling à Sarajevo, a 1940 French film directed by Max Ophüls
- Le Secret de Mayerling (1949 film), directed by Jean Delannoy with Denise Benoît and Dominique Blanchar
- Mayerling (1956 film) also known as Kronprinz Rudolfs letzte Liebe directed by Rudolf Jugert (Germany)
- Mayerling (1957 film) (US; released theatrically in Europe), starring Audrey Hepburn and Mel Ferrer
- Mayerling (1968 film), directed by Terence Young, starring Omar Sharif, Catherine Deneuve, James Mason and Ava Gardner

== See also ==
- Mayerling or 'Meyerling, a fictional character in Agatha Christie's novel The Big Four
