= Kronprinz Rudolfs letzte Liebe =

Kronprinz Rudolfs letzte Liebe is the original German title of two films about Rudolf, Crown Prince of Austria (1858 – 1889) and the Mayerling incident:

- Crown Prince Rudolph's Last Love (1955 film)
- The Crown Prince (2006 film)
