= The Fate of the House of Habsburg =

1928 film

- Directed by: Rolf Raffé
- Written by: Max Ferner
- Starring: Fritz Spira; Alfons Fryland; Leni Riefenstahl
- Cinematography: Marius Holdt
- Production companies: Essem-Film; Leo-Film
- Release date: 16 November 1928
- Country: Germany
- Languages: Silent; German intertitles

The Fate of the House of Habsburg (German: Das Schicksal derer von Habsburg) is a 1928 German silent drama film directed by Rolf Raffé and starring Fritz Spira, Alfons Fryland, and Leni Riefenstahl. It is based on the Mayerling incident of 1889, wherein a Crown Prince of Austria killed his mistress and himself.

The film's sets were designed by Artur Berger.

== Cast ==
- Fritz Spira as Emperor Franz Josef
- Erna Morena as Empress Elisabeth
- Maly Delschaft as Crown Princess Stefanie
- Alfons Fryland as Crown Prince Rudolph
- Franz Kammauf as Bratfisch, Coachman
- Leni Riefenstahl as Maria Vetsera
- Willi Hubert as Franz Ferdinand
- Irene Krauß as Baroness Helene Vetsera
- Ernst Recniczek as Philip of Coburg
- Carmen Cartellieri as Countess Larisch
- Albert Kersten as Count Hoyos
- Paul Askonas as Montenuovo
- Alice Roberts as Louise of Coburg
- Minje van Gooten as Countess Chotek
- Ferry Lukacs as Emperor Karl

== Bibliography ==
- Rother, Rainer (2003). Leni Riefenstahl: The Seduction of Genius. Translated by Bott, Martin H. London: Continuum International Publishing. ISBN 978-0-8264-7023-2.
