= Vetsera =

Vetsera is a surname. Notable people with the surname include:

- Baroness Mary Vetsera (1871–1889), Austrian noblewoman
- Helene von Vetsera (1847–1925), Austrian noblewoman.
