= Marinka (operetta) =

Operetta by Emmerich Kálmán

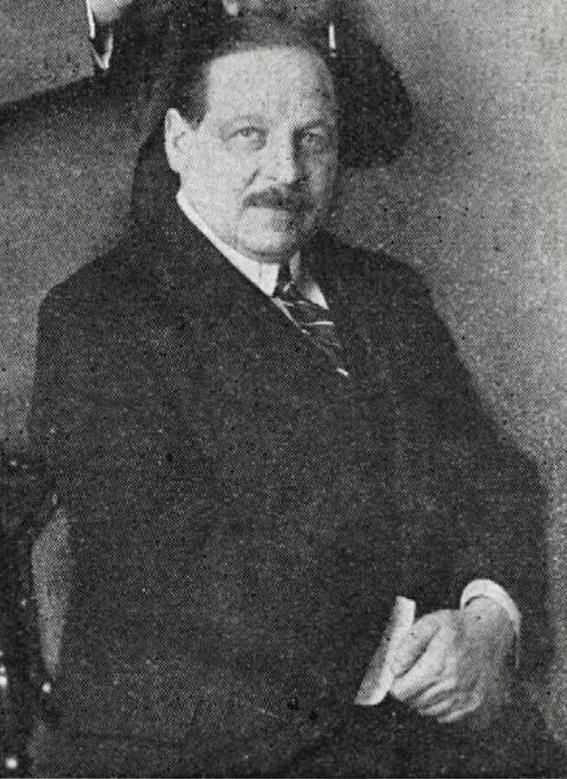
Emmerich Kálmán

Marinka is an operetta by Hungarian composer Emmerich Kálmán with book by George Marion, Jr. and Karl Farkas, and lyrics by George Marion, Jr. The operetta is a retelling of the story of the Mayerling Incident, but with a happy ending replacing the infamous 1889 double suicide of Austrian Crown Prince Rudolf and his mistress, Maria Vetsera. The best-known songs include "Only One Touch of Vienna," "Sigh by Night," "The Cab Song," and "When I Auditioned for the Harem of the Shah".

== Productions ==
It was first produced on Broadway by Jules J. Leventhal and Harry Howard with financial backing from Lee Shubert and Warner Bros. It was staged by Hassard Short, choreographed by Albertina Rasch and used set designs by Howard Bay and costume designs by Mary Grant. The work premiered on July 18, 1945, at the Winter Garden Theatre. The production moved to the Ethel Barrymore Theatre on October 1, 1945, running until December 8, 1945, for a total of 165 performances. The opening night cast included Joan Roberts (Marinka), Harry Stockwell (Rudolph), Romo Vincent (Bratfisch), Michael Barrett (Sergeant Negulegul), Paul Campbell (Count Hoyos), Ronnie Cunningham (Tilly), Bob Douglas (Lieutenant Baltatzy), Leonard Elliott (Francis), Jack Gansert (Lieutenant Palafy), Noel Gordon (Naval Lieutenant), Adrienne Gray (Countess Huebner), Taylor Holmes (Count Lobkowitz), Jack Leslie (Waiter), Ethel Levey (Madame Sacher), Reinhold Schünzel (Emperor Franz Josef), Elline Walther (Countess von Diefendorfer), Ruth Webb (Nadine), and Luba Malina (Countess Landovska). Later in the show's run radio personality Jerry Wayne replaced Stockwell as Rudolph and actress Edith Fellows replaced Roberts as Marinka.

The work received its Australian premiere in 1948 at the Tivoli Theatre in Melbourne.

The European premiere took place as late as 2016 at the Komische Oper Berlin in the form of a staged concert conducted by Koen Schoots and staged by Barrie Kosky. Insofar as the original orchestrations appear to have been lost, a completely new orchestration was conceived by Ferdinand von Seebach. The cast was cut back to the main four soloists: Marinka (Ruth Brauer-Kvam), Rudolph (Johannes Dunz), Bratfisch (Peter Bording) and Countess Landovska (Talya Lieberman), with Marinka and Bratfisch narrating the story.

== Synopsis ==
The plot, set in Vienna, Mayerling, and Budapest, with a prologue and epilogue in an open air movie theatre in Connecticut, was a retelling of the story of the Mayerling Incident.

In the prologue, youngsters at a movie palace watch a film about the Mayerling story and feel that it is too tragic. Their cab driver, the son of Rudolph's coachman, has his own version of the story.

== Musical numbers ==
Act 1

- "Only One Touch of Vienna" – Bratfisch and Girls
- "The Cab Song" – Bratfisch and Tilly
- "My Prince Came Riding" – Marinka and Debutantes
- "If I Never Waltz Again" – Marinka and Crown Prince Rudolph
- "The Cab Song" (Reprise) – Tilly, Countess von Diefendorfer and Debutantes
- "Turn on the Charm" – Bratfisch
- "One Last Love Song" – Marinka and Rudolph
- "Old Man Danube" – Bratfisch and Officers
- "Czardas" – Countess Landovska and Officers
- "Sigh by Night" – Marinka and Rudolph
- "One Last Love Song" (Reprise) – Marinka and Crown Prince Rudolph
- "Paletas" – Lieutenant Palafy and Dancers

Act 2

- "Treat a Woman Like a Drum" – Marinka, Tilly, Bratfisch, Francis and Lieutenant Palafy
- "When I Auditioned for the Harem of the Shah" – Countess Landovska
- "Young Man Danube" – Francis, Tilly, Lieutenant Palafy and Ensemble
- "Turn on the Charm" (Reprise) – Marinka and Rudolph
- "Sigh by Night" (Reprise) – Marinka and Rudolph
- "One Last Love Song" (Reprise) – Marinka, Rudolph and Company

== Sources ==
- Nathan, George J. (1974). "Marinka July 18, 1945". Theatre Book of the Year, 1945–1946. Fairleigh Dickinson Univ Press, pp. 52–60. ISBN 0-8386-1174-5
- Time (July 30, 1945). "The Theater: New Musical in Manhattan"
