= The Secret of Mayerling =

1949 film

- Theatrical film poster
- French: Le secret de Mayerling
- Directed by: Jean Delannoy
- Written by: Jacques Rémy; Jean Delannoy; Philippe Hériat
- Produced by: Claude Dolbert; Jean Velter
- Starring: Jean Marais; Dominique Blanchar; Jean Debucourt; Claude Farell
- Cinematography: Robert Lefebvre
- Edited by: James Cuenet
- Music by: Louis Beydts
- Production company: Codo Cinéma
- Distributed by: Les Films Marceau
- Release date: 7 May 1949
- Running time: 90 minutes
- Country: France
- Language: French
- Box office: 2,430,628 admissions (France)

The Secret of Mayerling (French: Le secret de Mayerling) is a 1949 French Historical drama film directed by Jean Delannoy and starring Jean Marais, Dominique Blanchar and Jean Debucourt. It set around the 1889 Mayerling Incident when the crown prince of the Austrian Empire was found having apparently committed suicide with his lover.

It was shot at the Epinay Studios with sets designed by the art director Raymond Druart.

Exterior shots were filmed in the Munster Valley between Kastelberg and Schnepfenried, including in Mittlach (Haut-Rhin), from September 1948 to April 1949.

It was a commercial success in France and other European countries, including in West Germany where it was released by Constantin Film.

== Cast ==
- Jean Marais as Rudolf, Crown Prince of Austria
- Dominique Blanchar as Baroness Mary Vetsera
- Jean Debucourt as Emperor Franz Joseph
- Claude Farell as Countess Larisch
- Silvia Monfort as Archduchess Stéphanie
- Jane Marken as Baroness Vetsera
- Marguerite Jamois as Empress Elisabeth
- Denise Benoît as Anna Vetsera
- Madeleine Foujane as the German ambassador
- Michel Vitold as Archduke Jean-Salvator
- Jacques Dacqmine as Archduke François-Ferdinand
- Jean Toulout as Count Taaffe
- Raphaël Patorni as Count Hoyos
- François Richard as Prince of Saxe-Cobourg
- André Carnège as doctor
- Charles Lemontier as Loschek
- Jean Aymé as Nuncio
- Andrews Engelmann as the Killer
