= Crown Prince Rudolph's Last Love (1955 film) =

- Directed by: Rudolf Jugert
- Written by: Erna Fentsch
- Produced by: Herbert Gruber
- Starring: Rudolf Prack; Christiane Hörbiger; Winnie Markus
- Cinematography: Günther Anders
- Edited by: Herma Sandtner
- Music by: Willy Schmidt-Gentner
- Production companies: Lux Film; Sascha Film
- Distributed by: Constantin Film; Sascha-Film
- Release date: 28 February 1956
- Running time: 99 minutes
- Country: Austria
- Language: German

Crown Prince Rudolph's Last Love (German: Kronprinz Rudolfs letzte Liebe/Mayerling) is a 1955 Austrian historical drama film directed by Rudolf Jugert and starring Rudolf Prack, Christiane Hörbiger and Winnie Markus. The film portrays the tragic 1889 Mayerling Incident, in which Rudolf, Crown Prince of Austria and his lover Baroness Mary Vetsera committed suicide.

The film was shot in Agfacolor, with sets designed by Alexander Sawczynski and Werner Schlichting. It was made at the Rosenhügel Studios in Vienna.

== Cast ==
- Rudolf Prack as Crown Prince Rudolf
- Christiane Hörbiger as Baroness Mary Vetsera
- Winnie Markus as Countess Larisch
- Lil Dagover as Empress Elisabeth
- Erik Frey as Emperor Franz Joseph
- Attila Hörbiger as Josef Bratfisch, coachman
- Adrienne Gessner as Baroness Helene Vetsera
- Greta Zimmer as Crown Princess Stephanie
- Walter Reyer as Archduke Johann Salvator
- Karl Ehmann as Johann Loschek, valet
- Otto Wögerer as Krauß, chief of police
- Josef Kahlenberg as Adjutant of the Emperor
- C.W. Fernbach as Adjutant of the Crown Prince
- Eduard Volters as Baltazzi
- Karl Schwetter as Stockau
- Gretl Rainer as Agnes
- Erich Dörner as A Viennese man

== Bibliography ==
- Bock, Hans-Michael & Bergfelder, Tim. The Concise CineGraph. Encyclopedia of German Cinema. Berghahn Books, 2009.
