= Alma Vetsera Hayne =

American socialite and fraudster

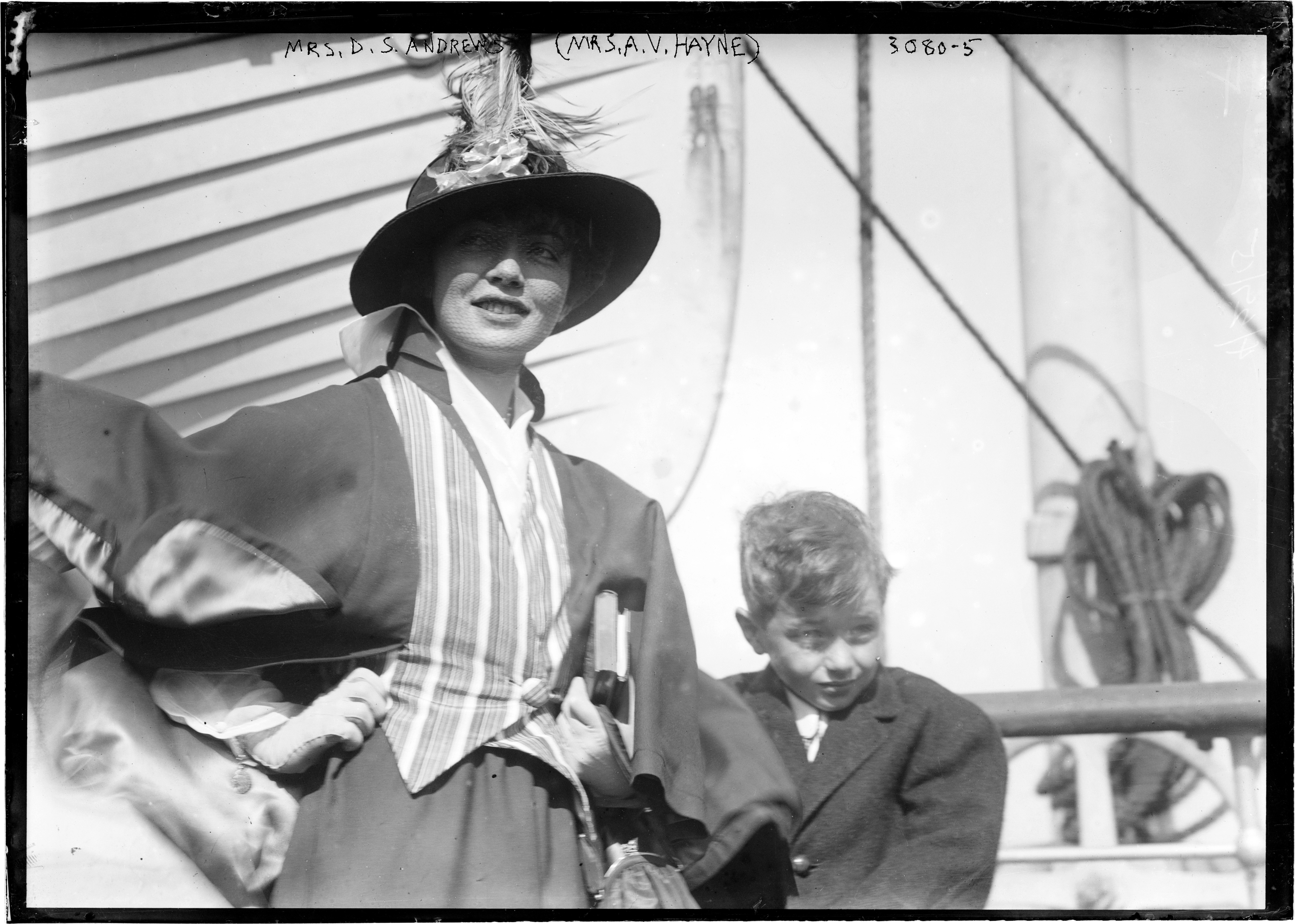
Alma and her son Charles Rudolph Spurway Hayne (1899-1983)

Alma Vetsera Hayne (1890–1919) was a New York City socialite who passed herself off as the daughter of Rudolf, Crown Prince of Austria and Baroness Mary Vetsera and called herself Princess Vetsera of Austria. She claimed her son, Charles Rudolph Spurway Hayne (1899-1983), was heir to the Austro-Hungarian throne.

== Biography ==
Her first husband was George Osborne Hayne (1875-1950). She married Donald Shields Andrews (1894-1930) on April 24, 1915. She married Sebastian Cedric Samuel Steane in London on 30 August 1919. She took her own life with poison on 12 November 1919 after attending the second victory ball for the end of World War I.

Shields Andrews, an inorganic chemist, would take his own life with poison in 1930 in Fair Haven, New Jersey. He had been working on a process to make synthetic gemstones.
