= The Crown Prince (2006 film) =

2006 television film directed by Robert Dornhelm

- Genre: Drama
- Screenplay by: Klaus Lintschinger, Didier Decoin
- Directed by: Robert Dornhelm
- Starring: Max von Thun; Vittoria Puccini; Omar Sharif; Christian Clavier
- Music by: Ludwig Eckmann, Jörg Magnus Pfeil
- Countries of origin: Austria, Germany, France, Italy

Production
- Producers: Kurt Mrkwicka; Ferdinand Dohna; Andreas Kamm
- Cinematography: Michael Riebl
- Editor: Ingrid Koller
- Running time: 180 minutes (shorter version: 105 minutes)

Original release
- Network: ORF 2 Das Erste; Rai 1
- Release: 2006

The Crown Prince (German: Kronprinz Rudolfs letzte Liebe; French: Prince Rodolphe: L'Héritier de Sissi; Italian: Il destino di un principe) is an Austrian-German-French-Italian television film from 2006 and deals with the last ten years of the life of the Austrian Crown Prince Rudolf von Habsburg.

The film was co-produced by EOS Entertainment and MR Film for Degeto Film, ORF, and RAI. For German television, the 180-minute two-part series was shortened by around 75 minutes and shown under the same title as a one-part film reduced to the romance with Mary Vetsera.

It was broadcast in Austria by ORF, in Germany by ARD and in Italy by RAI.

== Plot ==
Crown Prince Rudolf is a sensitive and intelligent young man who recognises and supports the need for changes and innovation for the Habsburg monarchy on the threshold of the twentieth century. However, neither his father, Emperor Franz Joseph, who adheres stoically to strict traditions, nor other political rulers such as the new Prime Minister Count Eduard Taaffe or the conservative Archbishop Schwarzenberg, who see these ideas as a threat to their position, want to hear anything about his vision of a united Europe. In order to dissuade Rudolf from his liberal fantasies, he is excluded from all important political decisions and sent to Prague.

There Rudolf experiences the happiness of love for the first time when, on the advice of his fatherly friend, the court painter Hans Canon, he mingles incognito with his people and meets Sarah, the daughter of a Jewish baker. However, this romance comes quickly to an end when the crown prince is recognised and the girl is then taken away and married, only to die of a violent fever shortly afterwards. After Rudolf drowns his grief in alcohol in the following months, he finally throws himself into politics with renewed zeal after Canon reminds him that a man can only change something if he acts accordingly.

Under the pseudonym Julius Felix, Rudolf writes in Moriz Szeps' newspaper and divulges his liberal ideas. The Kaiser and the Prime Minister, however, continue to pursue their conservative course and renew the alliance with Prussia under the young Kaiser Wilhelm II, which, according to Rudolf's fears, will sooner or later lead to war with France and Russia. Therefore, despite the urging of his mother Elisabeth, he repeatedly refuses the offer to become King of Hungary in order not to weaken the Habsburg monarchy further.

To ensure more stability, Rudolf agrees to marry Princess Stephanie of Belgium, who shortly gives birth to a daughter. During one of his numerous love affairs, Rudolf contracts syphilis, with which he infects Stephanie. As a result, she cannot have any more children; that puts a strain on the already strained relationship between the two.

When the Crown Prince, now addicted to morphine as a result of his syphilis, has to watch his visions of a better future shatter bit by bit due to the narrow-minded politics of his father and a series of unfortunate circumstances, he is filled with depression and thoughts of suicide. The only thing that gives him stability is the romance with the young Baroness Mary Vetsera, who already fell in love with him as a little girl.

Ultimately, this is no salvation for him either; he decides to commit suicide in his hunting lodge in Mayerling. However, Mary, seeing through his intentions, insists on going to death with him out of love. While the body of Rudolf is buried with full honors in the imperial crypt, the young Baroness Vetsera is buried in an anonymous grave in order not to widen this unbelievable scandal.

== Cast ==
- Max von Thun: Crown Prince Rudolf
- Vittoria Puccini: Mary Baroness Vetsera
- Klaus Maria Brandauer: Emperor Franz Joseph
- Sandra Ceccarelli: Empress Elisabeth
- Fritz Karl: Archduke Johann Salvator
- Omar Sharif: Hans Canon
- Birgit Minichmayr: Mizzi Kaspar
- Joachim Król: Moriz Szeps
- Julia Jentsch: Sarah
- Daniela Golpashin: Crown Princess Stéphanie
- Alexandra Vandernoot: Helene Vetsera
- Christian Clavier: Count Eduard Taaffe
- Robert Stadlober: Emperor Wilhelm II
- Wolfgang Böck: Josef Bratfisch
- Nikolaus Paryla: Johann Loschek
- Karl Markovics: Count Bombelles
- Wolfgang Hübsch: Archbischop Schwarzenberg
- Francesca Habsburg-Lothringen: Marie Henriette von Österreich
