= Mayerling (1936 film) =

1936 film by Anatole Litvak

- Theatrical release poster
- Directed by: Anatole Litvak
- Written by: Claude Anet (book); Joseph Kessel; Irma von Cube
- Produced by: Seymour Nebenzal
- Starring: Charles Boyer; Jean Dax; Jean Debucourt; Marthe Regnier; Danielle Darrieux; Suzy Prim
- Cinematography: Armand Thirard
- Edited by: Henri Rust
- Music by: Arthur Honegger and Maurice Jaubert
- Production companies: Nero-Film; Mercury Films
- Distributed by: Pax Films (US)
- Release dates: 29 February 1936 (France); 13 September 1937 (US)
- Running time: 95 minutes
- Country: France
- Language: French

Mayerling is a 1936 French historical drama film directed by Anatole Litvak and produced by Seymour Nebenzal from a screenplay by Marcel Achard, Joseph Kessel, and Irma von Cube, based on the 1930 novel Idyll's End by Claude Anet.

The film stars Charles Boyer and Danielle Darrieux with René Bergeron, Jean Davy, Jean Dax, Jean Debucourt and Gabrielle Dorziat, and Jean-Louis Barrault in a bit part. The film is based on the real-life story of Crown Prince Rudolf of Austria, his affair with the 17-year-old Baroness Maria Vetsera and their tragic end at Mayerling.

The film was remade twice: once as the 1957 television film Mayerling, also directed by Anatole Litvak and starring Mel Ferrer and Audrey Hepburn, then as the 1968 film Mayerling in color by MGM, starring Omar Sharif, Catherine Deneuve, James Mason, and Ava Gardner.

== Plot ==
Vienna is disturbed by protestors agitating for political change. Crown Prince Rudolph is arrested at a meeting. His father Emperor Franz Joseph insists he get married and settle down. Rudolph reluctantly agrees.

Five years later, Rudolph has become an unhappy playboy. On the night of his wedding anniversary he meets Baroness Marie Vetsera and they fall in love.

== Cast ==
- Charles Boyer as Archduke Rudolph of Austria
- Jean Dax as Emperor Franz Joseph I of Austria
- Jean Debucourt as Count Taaffe
- Marthe Regnier as Baroness Vetsera (Helene)
- Danielle Darrieux as Marie Vetsera
- Suzy Prim as Countess Larisch
- Vladimir Sokoloff as Chief of Police
- Andre Dubosc as Loschek the Valet
- René Bergeron as Szeps
- Gabrielle Dorziat as Empress Elisabeth
- Raymond Aimos
- Gina Manès as Marinka
- Yolande Laffon as Stephanie

== Reception ==
Writing for The Spectator in 1936, Graham Greene gave the film a poor review, describing it as "purposeless" and "a too romantic manner for [his] taste". Greene particularly criticizes the conclusion of the film which he characterized as "a Vienna 'musical' without the music: a pathetic ending". Greene did, however, praise the film's production and acting.

== Restoration ==
A restored DVD was issued in the U.S. by The Criterion Collection (Essential Art House) on September 15, 2009.
