= Mayerling =

Village in Baden, Austria

Coordinates: 48°02′49″N 16°05′54″E

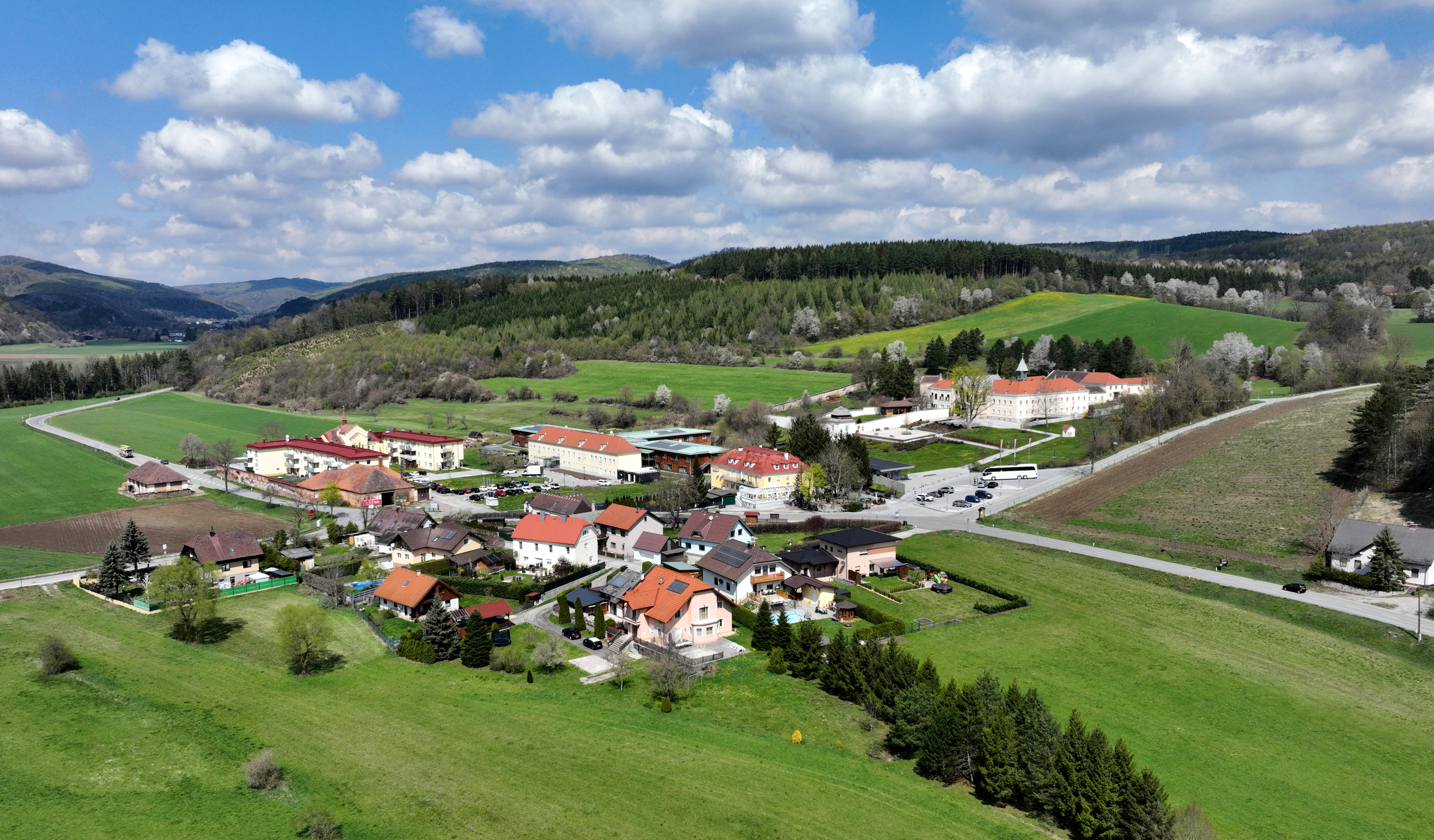
Southeast view of Mayerling

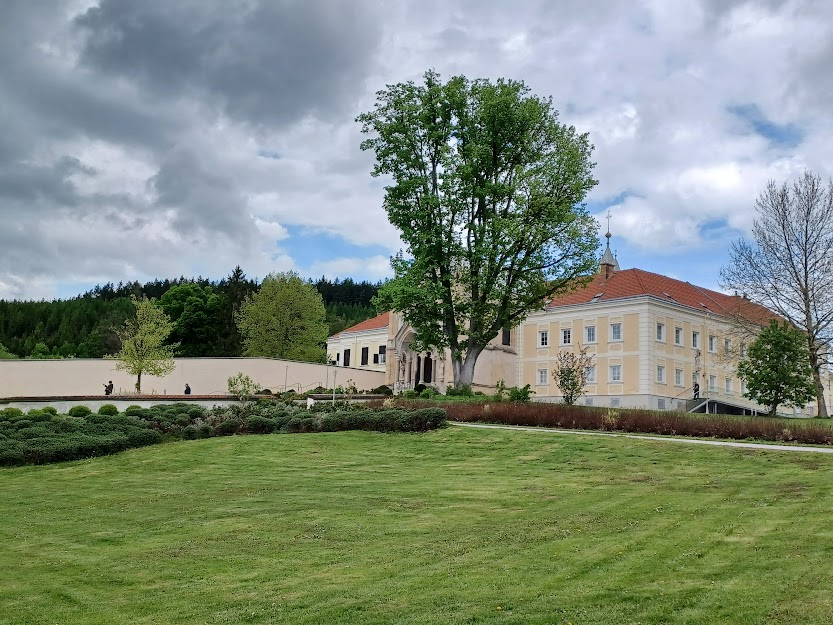
The church at the site of the original hunting lodge.

Mayerling is a small village (pop. 200) in Lower Austria belonging to the municipality of Alland in the district of Baden. It is situated on the Schwechat river, in the Wienerwald (Vienna woods), 24 kilometres (15 mi) southwest of Vienna. From 1550, it was in the possession of the abbey of Heiligenkreuz.

== The Mayerling incident ==
In 1886, Crown Prince Rudolf of Austria, only son of Emperor Franz Joseph I and Empress Elisabeth, and heir to the Austro-Hungarian crown, acquired the manor and transformed it into a hunting lodge. It was in this hunting lodge that, on 30 January 1889, he was found dead with his mistress, Baroness Mary Vetsera, apparently as a result of suicide.

Exactly what happened is unknown, but on 31 July 2015, the Austrian National Library issued copies of Vetsera's letters of farewell to her mother and other family members. The letters — written in Mayerling shortly before the deaths — state clearly and unambiguously that Mary Vetsera was preparing to commit suicide alongside Rudolf, out of love.

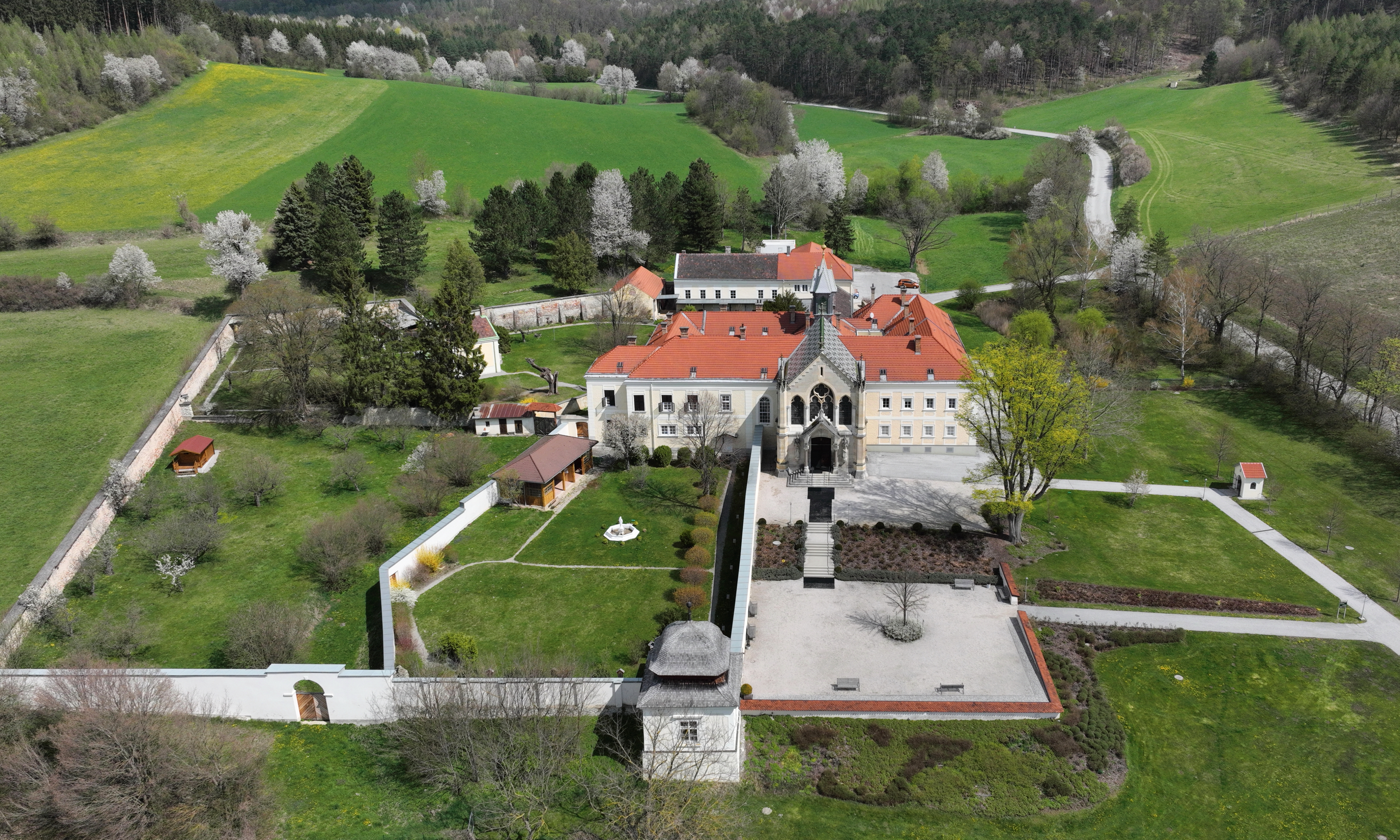
Church and convent of the Discalced Carmelite nuns at Mayerling

After the deaths of Rudolf and Vetsera, Emperor Franz Joseph, who wanted to endow a new church building, had the hunting lodge changed into a convent which then was settled by nuns of the Discalced Carmelite Order. The church was dedicated to Our Lady of Mount Carmel, the convent to Saint Joseph. A statue of the Virgin Mary in the Lady Chapel has the facial features of the Empress Elisabeth and a dagger pierces the Immaculate Heart of Mary. The position of the main cross in the chapel is supposed to be where the bed of Rudolf of Austria and Mary Vetsera were situated. Prayers are still said daily by the nuns for the repose of the souls of Rudolf and Mary.

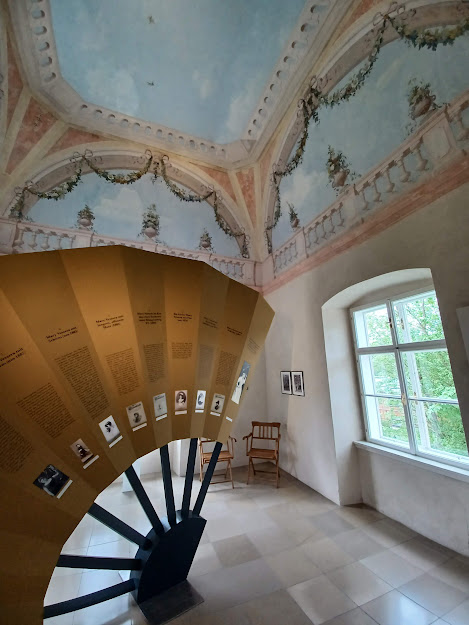
The Mayerling tea house, only original building remaining of the hunting lodge, with a display on the life of Marie Vetsera, in 2023.

A visitor center nearby the convent was opened in 2014. This center, the restored tea pavilion (the only remaining building from the original hunting lodge and now housing a display on Vetsera's life), and some other rooms with objects from the 19th century now form the exhibition of the "Museum Altes Jagdschloss Mayerling".
