= Helene von Vetsera =

Austrian noblewoman (1847–1925)

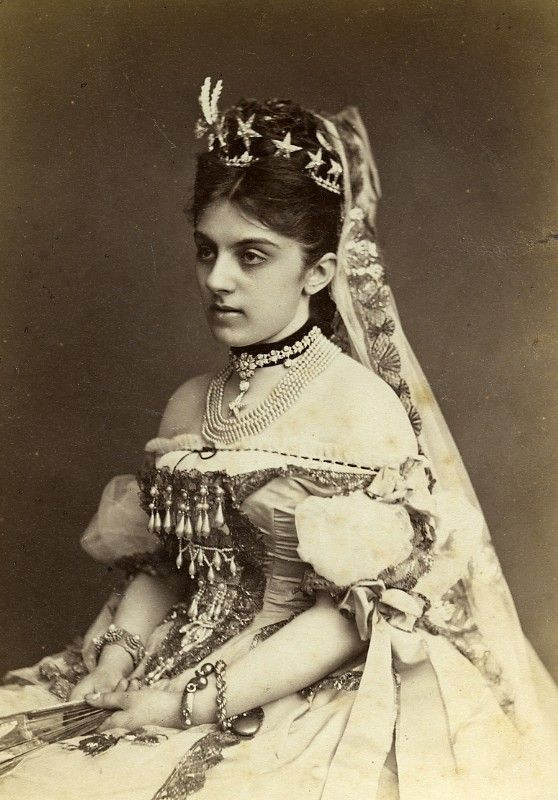
- Helene Baltazzi in 1870
- Born: Helene Baltazzi; 1847; Marseille, Kingdom of France
- Died: 1 February 1925 (aged 77–78); Vienna, Austria
- Spouse: Baron Albin von Vetsera (m. 1864; died 1887)
- Children: Baroness Mary von Vetsera
- Parents: Theodor Baltazzi (father); Elizabeth Sarell (mother)

Baroness Helene von Vetsera (née Baltazzi; 1847 – 1 February 1925) was an Austrian noblewoman and socialite. She was the daughter of a wealthy lawyer and financial advisor, and she married Albin Freiherr von Vetsera in 1864. She became a baroness when her husband was created a baron in 1870. She enjoyed significant prestige in the social life of Vienna until she was disgraced by the Mayerling incident in 1889, when her daughter Baroness Mary von Vetsera and Crown Prince Rudolf were found dead together. Helene von Vetsera left high society after the incident, and she lost her fortune after World War I.

== Biography ==
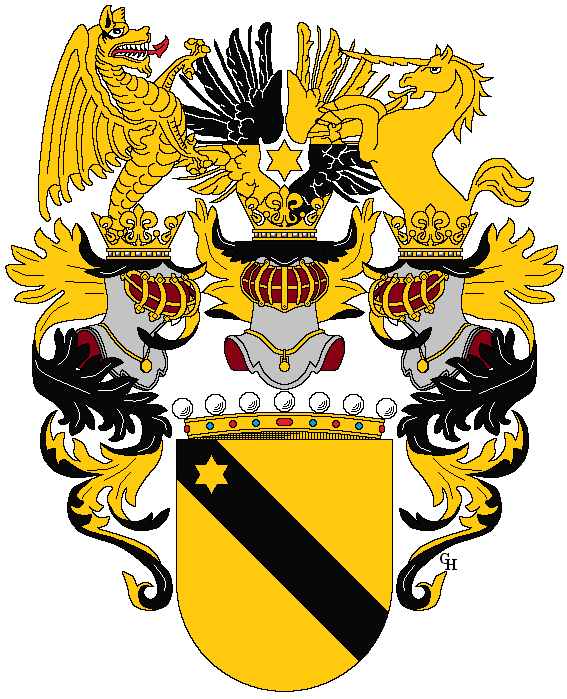
Coat of arms of Albin Freiherr von Vetsera (1870)

Helene Baltazzi was born in Marseille in 1847 as one of ten children to Theodor Baltazzi and Elizabeth Sarell. Her father was a lawyer from a Venetian–Greek family, and he had made a fortune working as the financial advisor for Sultan Abdulmejid I in Constantinople. Her mother was the daughter of the English vice consul in Constantinople. After the deaths of her parents in 1860 and 1863, respectively, she and her siblings were placed under the guardianship of their father's associate, diplomat Albin Vetsera. Helene and Albin married in 1864. At the time, she was considered to be the wealthiest bachelorette in Constantinople. She eventually settled in Leopoldstadt to raise their children. Her husband was knighted in 1867 and made a Baron in 1870, taking the nobiliary particle von. The family moved to Landstraße in 1880, where they grew more involved in the aristocratic life of Vienna.

In 1889, Helene von Vetsera was disgraced following the Mayerling incident, in which her teenage daughter Baroness Mary von Vetsera and Crown Prince Rudolf died after engaging in a secret affair and making a suicide pact. She moved to Payerbach, where she purchased a villa and converted it into the Villa Vetsera. She moved to Wieden in 1897. Austria underwent severe hyperinflation after World War I, and Helene von Vetsera lost her fortune. She died on 1 February 1925.
