= Rudolf, Crown Prince of Austria =

Heir to the Austrian throne (1858–1889)

Rudolf
- Crown Prince of Austria; Prince Royal of Hungary and Bohemia
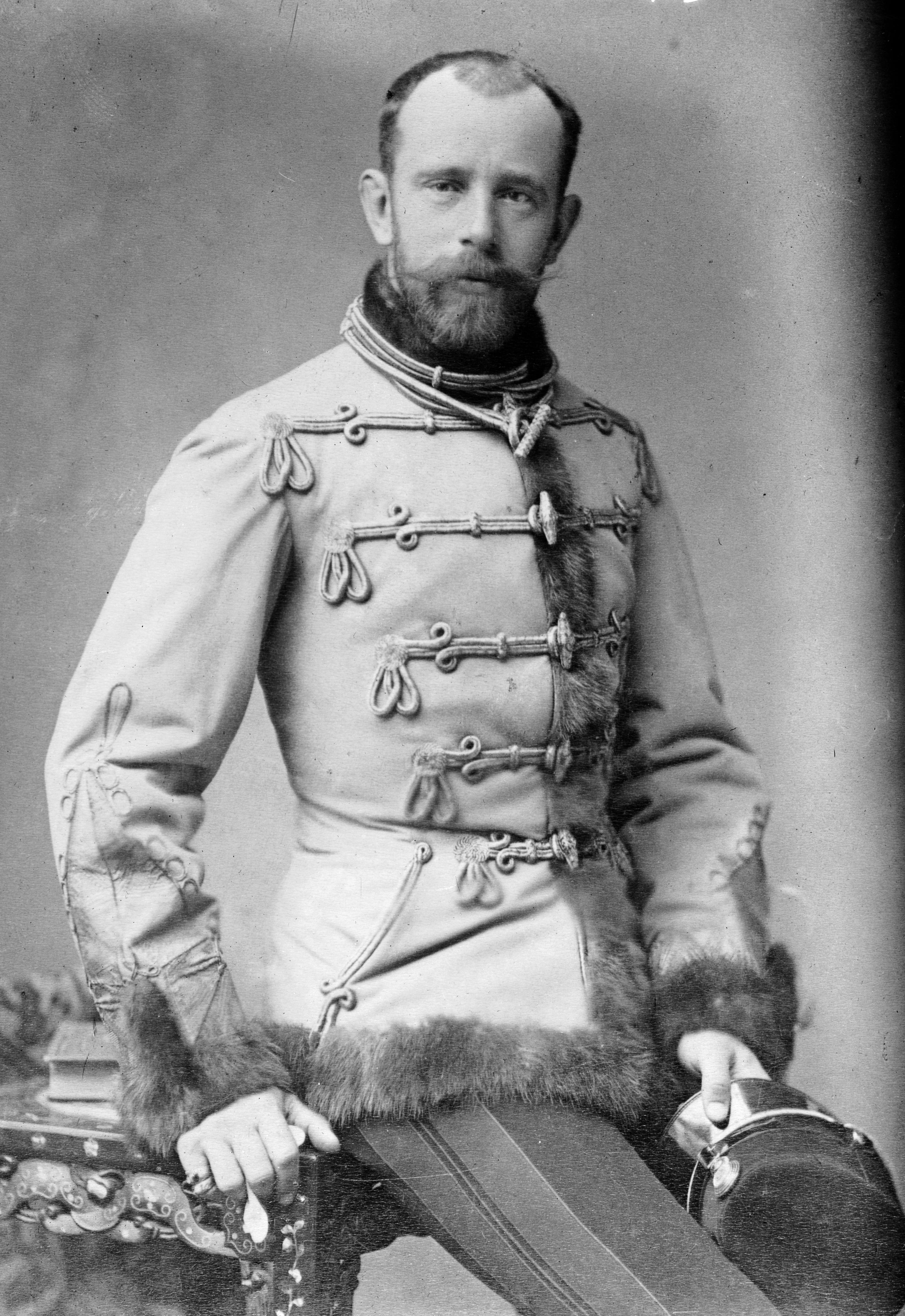
- Portrait by Károly Koller, 1887
- Born: 21 August 1858; Schloss Laxenburg, Laxenburg, Lower Austria, Austrian Empire
- Died: 30 January 1889 (aged 30); Mayerling, Lower Austria, Austria-Hungary
- Cause of death: Self-inflicted gunshot wound
- Burial: Imperial Crypt, Vienna
- Spouse: Princess Stéphanie of Belgium (m. 1881)
- Issue: Elisabeth Marie, Princess of Windisch-Graetz
Names
- German: Rudolf Franz Karl Josef; English: Rudolph Francis Charles Joseph
- House: Habsburg-Lorraine
- Father: Franz Joseph I of Austria
- Mother: Elisabeth of Bavaria
- Religion: Roman Catholicism

Rudolf, Crown Prince of Austria (Rudolf Franz Karl Josef; 21 August 1858 – 30 January 1889) was the only son and third child of Emperor Franz Joseph I and Empress Elisabeth of Austria. He was heir apparent to the imperial throne of the Austro-Hungarian Empire from birth. In 1889, he died in a suicide pact with his mistress Baroness Mary Vetsera at the Mayerling hunting lodge. The ensuing scandal made international headlines.

== Background ==
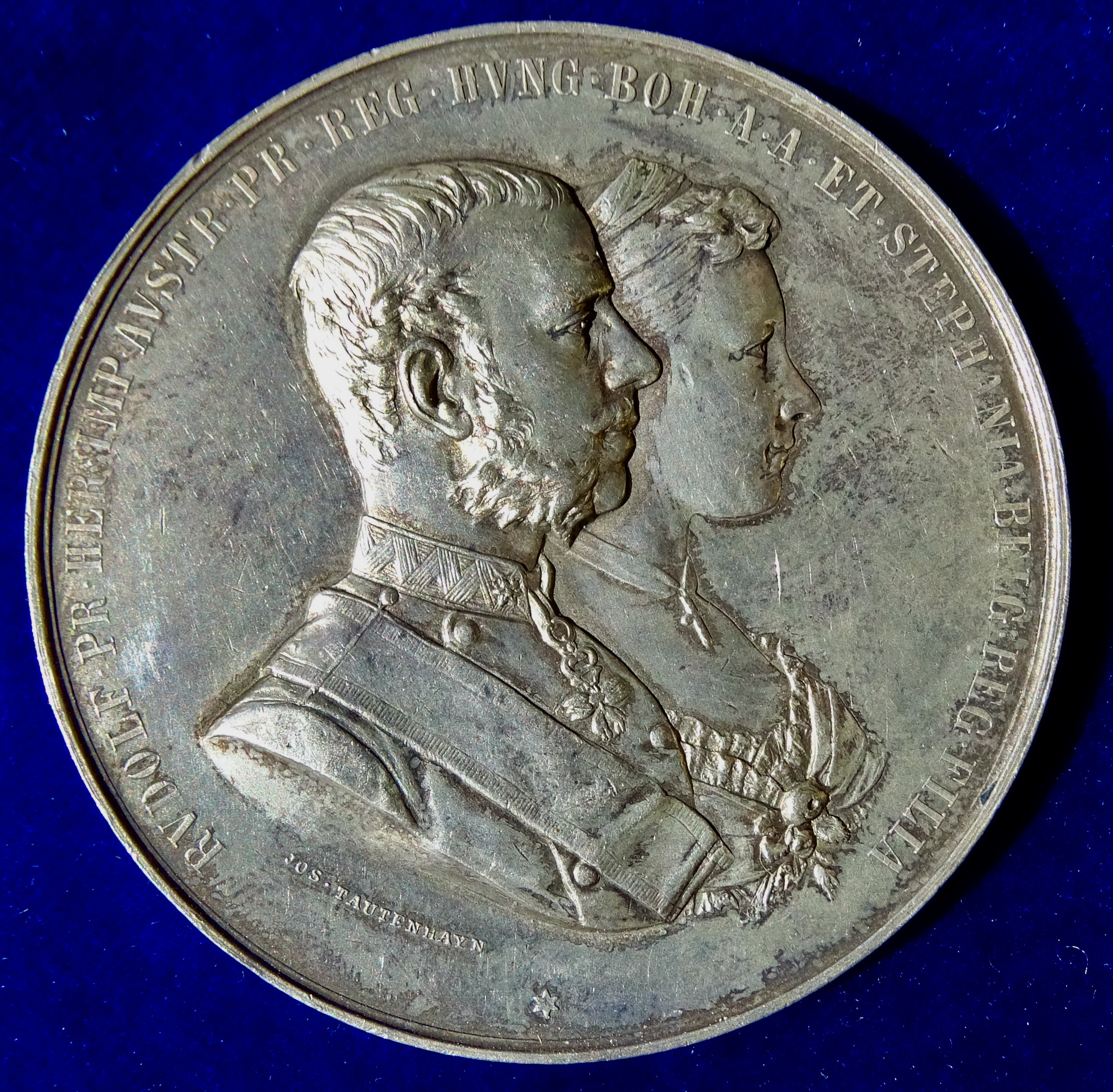
Wedding medal 1881 by Tautenhayn, obverse

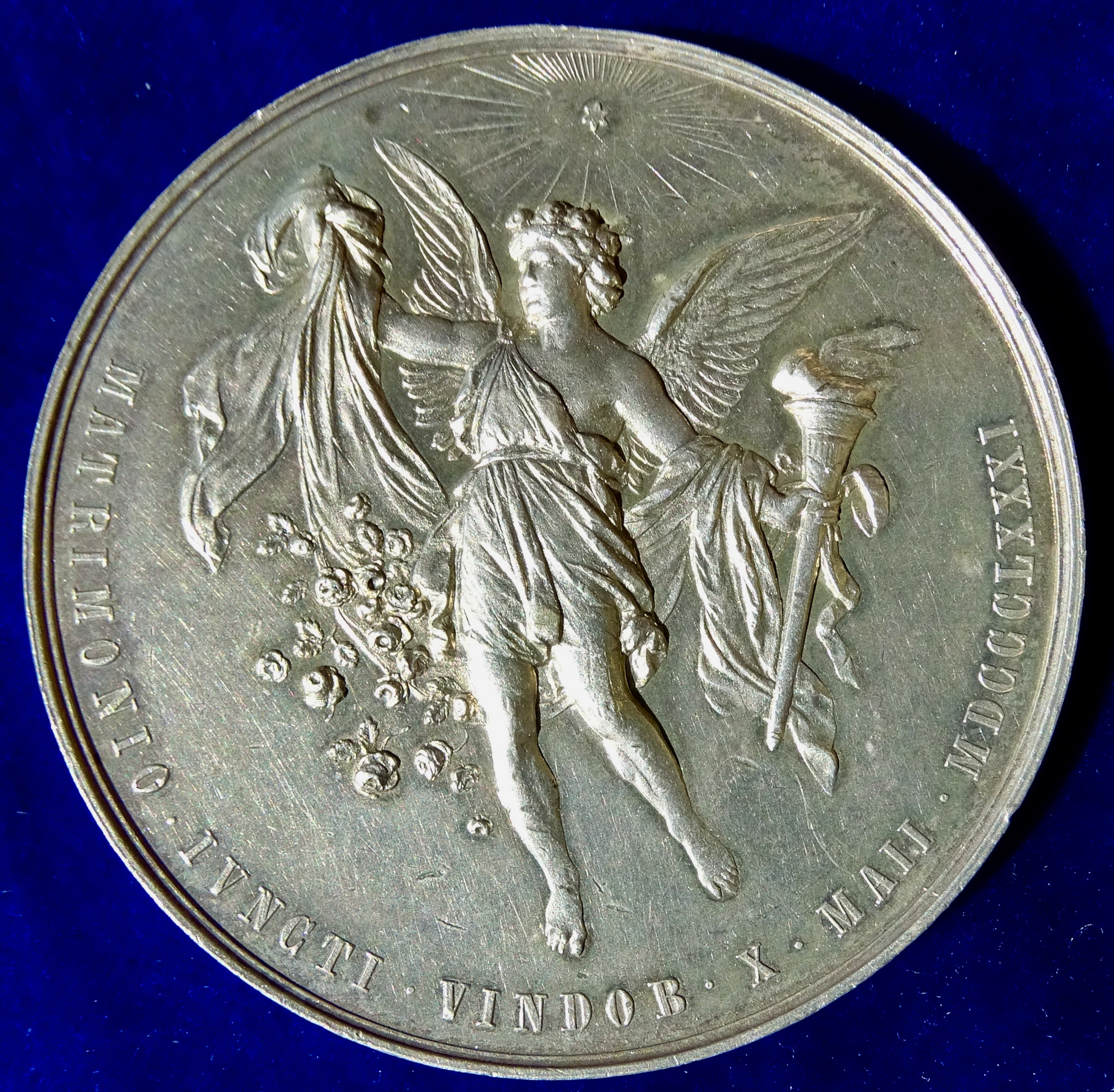
The reverse of this wedding medal showing Hymen the god of marriage

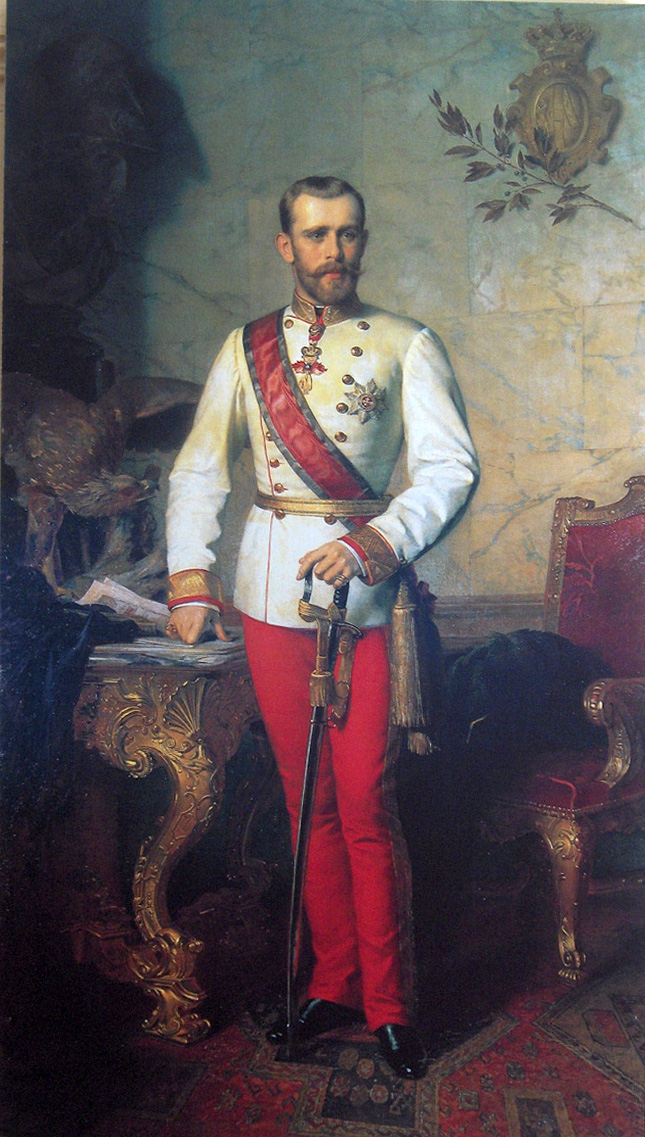
Portrait by Eugen Felix

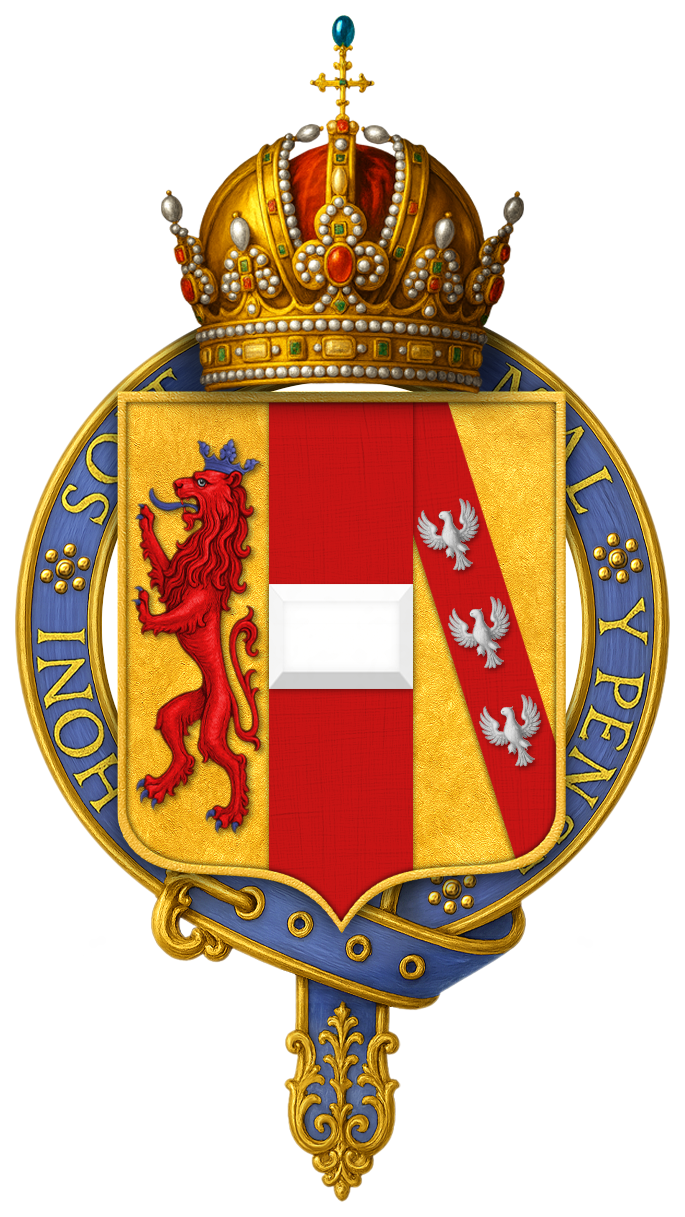
Garter encircled arms of Rudolf, Crown Prince of Austria

Rudolf was born at Schloss Laxenburg, a castle near Vienna, as the son of Emperor Franz Joseph I and Empress Elisabeth. He was named after the first Habsburg King of Germany, Rudolf I, who reigned from 1273 to 1291. Rudolf was raised together with his older sister Gisela and the two were very close. At the age of six, Rudolf was separated from his sister as he began his education to become a future Emperor of Austria. This did not change their relationship and Gisela remained close to him until she left Vienna upon her marriage to Prince Leopold of Bavaria. Rudolf's initial education under Leopold Gondrecourt was physically and emotionally abusive, and likely a contributing factor in his later suicide.

Influenced by his tutor Ferdinand von Hochstetter (who later became the first superintendent of the Imperial Natural History Museum), Rudolf became very interested in natural sciences, starting a mineral collection at an early age. After his death, large portions of his mineral collection came into the possession of the University of Agriculture in Vienna, which is now known as the University of Natural Resources and Life Sciences, Vienna.

In 1877, Count Karl Albert von Bombelles was master of the young prince. Bombelles had been the custodian of Rudolf's aunt Empress Charlotte of Mexico.

In contrast with his deeply conservative father, Rudolf held liberal views that were closer to those of his mother. Nevertheless, his relationship with her was at times strained.

== Marriage ==
In Vienna, on 10 May 1881, Rudolf married Princess Stéphanie of Belgium, a daughter of King Leopold II of Belgium, at the Augustinian Church in Vienna. Although their marriage was initially a happy one, by the time their only child, the Archduchess Elisabeth ("Erzsi"), was born on 2 September 1883, the couple had drifted apart.

After the birth of their child, Rudolf became increasingly unstable as he drank heavily and was having many affairs. This behaviour, however, was not entirely new as Rudolf had a long history of reckless promiscuity prior to his marriage.

In 1886, Rudolf became seriously ill and the couple was directed to the island of Lacroma (off present day Croatia) for his treatment. In transit, Stéphanie also became seriously ill and described "suffering terrible pain". The couple's diagnosis of peritonitis was kept secret by order of the Emperor.

After intensive treatment, Stéphanie was able to recover from the illness but she was left unable to have children as the illness had destroyed her fallopian tubes. Stéphanie's symptoms and outcome indicate Rudolf had most likely infected her with gonorrhoea. Rudolf himself did not improve with treatment and grew increasingly ill. It is likely he had contracted syphilis in addition to gonorrhoea. In order to cope with the effects of the disease, Rudolf began taking large doses of morphine.

By 1889, it was common knowledge at Court that Stéphanie would not have any more children due to the events of 1886, and that Rudolf's health was deteriorating.

== Death ==
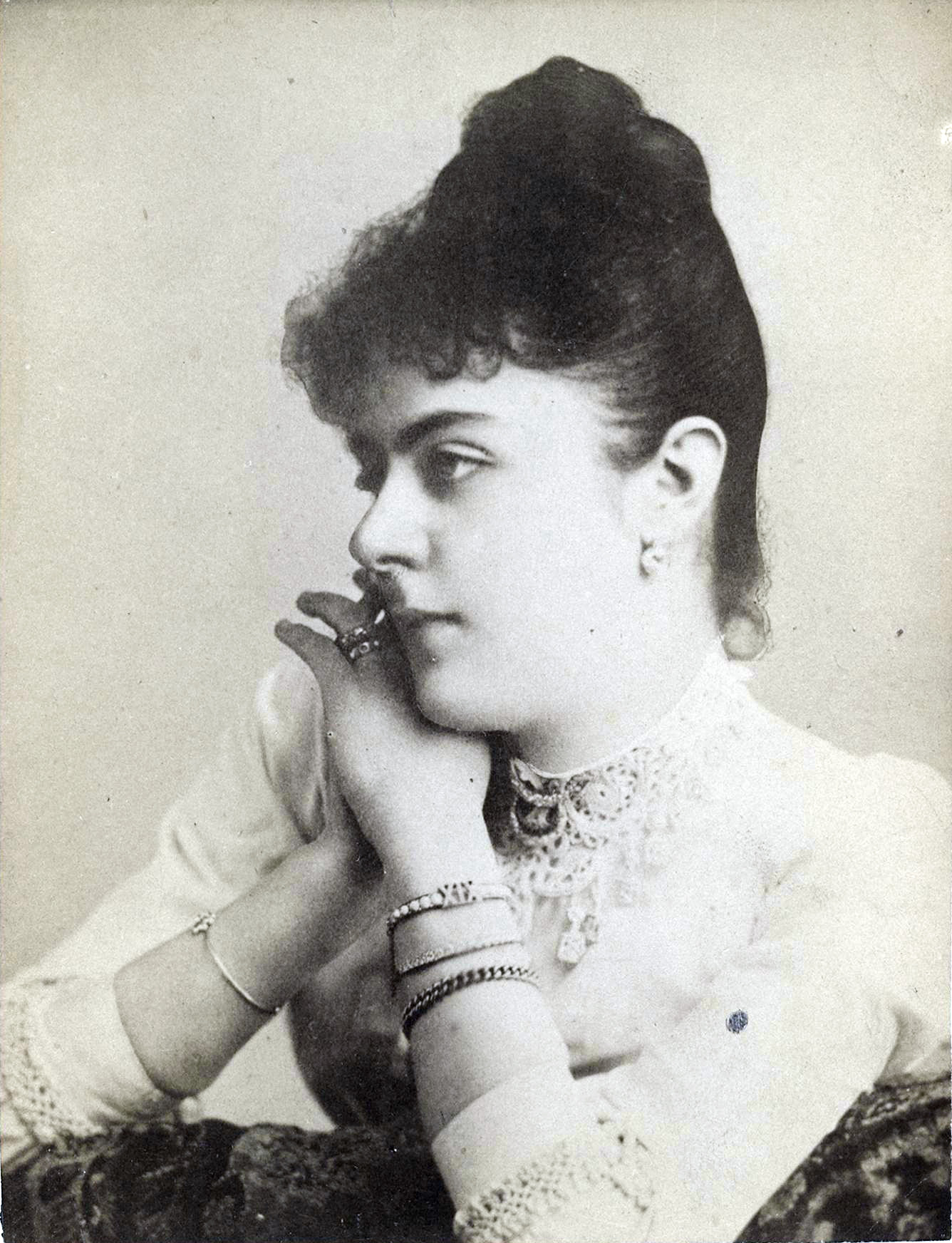
Baroness Mary Vetsera in 1888

In 1886, Rudolf bought Mayerling, a hunting lodge. In late 1888, the 30-year-old Crown Prince met the 17-year-old Baroness Marie von Vetsera, and began an affair with her. On 30 January 1889, he and the young baroness were discovered dead in the lodge as a result of an apparent joint suicide. As suicide would prevent him from being given a church burial, Rudolf was officially declared to have been in a state of "mental unbalance", and he was buried in the Imperial Crypt (Kaisergruft) of the Capuchin Church in Vienna. Vetsera's body was smuggled out of Mayerling in the middle of the night and secretly buried in the village cemetery at Heiligenkreuz. The Emperor had Mayerling converted into a penitential convent of Carmelite nuns and endowed a chantry so that daily prayers would eternally be said by the nuns for the repose of Rudolf's soul.

Vetsera's private letters were discovered in a safe deposit box in an Austrian bank in 2015, and they revealed that she was preparing to commit suicide alongside Rudolf, out of love.

== Aftermath of death ==
Rudolf's death plunged his mother, Empress Elisabeth, into despair. She wore black or pearl grey, the colours of mourning, for the rest of her life and spent more and more time away from the imperial court in Vienna. Her daughter Gisela was afraid that she might also commit suicide. In 1898, while Elisabeth was abroad in Geneva, Switzerland, she was murdered by an Italian anarchist, Luigi Lucheni.

Rudolf's death had left Franz Joseph without a direct male heir. Franz-Joseph's younger brother, Archduke Karl Ludwig, was next in line to the Austro-Hungarian throne, though it was falsely reported that he had renounced his succession rights. In any case, his death in 1896 from typhoid made his eldest son, Archduke Franz Ferdinand, the new heir presumptive. However, Archduke Franz Ferdinand was assassinated in 1914 (an event that precipitated World War I), so when Emperor Franz-Joseph died in November 1916, he was succeeded instead by his grandnephew, Charles I of Austria. The demands of the American President, Woodrow Wilson forced Emperor Charles I to renounce involvement in state affairs in Vienna in early November 1918. As a result, the Austro-Hungarian Empire ceased to exist and a republic came into being without revolution. Charles I and his family went into exile in Switzerland after spending a short time at Castle Eckartsau.

== Legend ==
Rudolf (also known as Ludolf or Ludó in folklore) was a figure in folk stories in Hungary. Legend has it, that it was his father who sentenced him to death, as he was a Hungarophile and defied his Hungarophobic father's will. However, the latter secretly pardoned him and buried a waxwork in his place, and the real Ludó lived out his life in South America. The legend's popularity peaked during the interwar period.

== In popular culture ==
- In famed author André Gide's novel Lafcadio's Adventures, there's a fictionalized conspiracy behind the Mayerling Incident whereas it was the Archduke's cousin who killed him and his young lover, titled Maria Wettsyera and called the Archduke's "young bride,"
- Mayerling, a 1936 film directed by Anatole Litvak, with Charles Boyer and Danielle Darrieux, based on a novel by Claude Anet.
- Sarajevo (1940), a film directed Max Ophüls starts with Rudolf's death.
- The fictionalized musical Marinka (1945), with book by George Marion Jr., and Karl Farkas, lyrics by George Marion Jr., music by Emmerich Kálmán.
- Mayerling, a 1957 film, starring Mel Ferrer as Crown Prince Rudolf, Audrey Hepburn as Baroness Mary Vetsara with Lorne Greene as Kaiser Franz Josef.
- Mayerling, a 1968 film, starring Omar Sharif as Crown Prince Rudolf, Catherine Deneuve as Mary with James Mason as Kaiser Franz Josef and Ava Gardner as Empress Elisabeth.
- Japanese Takarazuka Revue's "Utakata no Koi"/"Ephemeral Love", based on the 1968 film.
- Requiem for a Crown Prince, one-hour episode of the British documentary/drama series Fall of Eagles (1974), directed by James Furman and written by David Turner, tracks in detail the events of 30 January 1889 and the following few days at Mayerling.
- Miklós Jancsó's 1975 film Vizi privati, pubbliche virtù (Private Vices, Public Virtues), a reinterpretation in which the lovers and their friends are murdered by imperial authorities for treason and immorality.
- Kenneth MacMillan's 1978 ballet, Mayerling.
- Japanese manga by Higuri You, Tenshi no Hitsugi (2000).
- The Crown Prince, a 2006 television film in two parts directed by Robert Dornhelm, with Crown Prince Rudolf portrayed by German-Austrian actor Max von Thun.
- Composer Frank Wildhorn's musical Rudolf – Affaire Mayerling (2006), produced in some territories as The Last Kiss or Rudolf – The Last Kiss.
- Rudolf (2011), a play by David Logan which dramatises the last few weeks of the life of Crown Prince Rudolf.
- A highly fictionalized version of the incident at Mayerling is depicted in the 2006 film The Illusionist. Crown Prince Leopold (played by Rufus Sewell) is a fictional analog of Rudolf.
- The Empress, a German historical drama television series based on the life of Empress Elisabeth of Austria, starring Devrim Lingnau in the title role and Philip Froissant as Emperor Franz Joseph.
- Freud, a 2020 miniseries in which Rudolf (played by Stefan Konarske) and his father Emperor Franz Joseph (Johannes Krisch) are pivotal characters.
- Corsage, a 2022 film, starred Aaron Friesz as Crown Prince Rudolph with Vicky Krieps as Empress Elisabeth.

== Titles, styles and honours ==
=== Titles and styles ===
- 21 August 1858 – 30 January 1889: His Imperial and Royal Highness The Crown Prince of Austria, Hungary, Bohemia and Croatia

=== Honours ===
Domestic

- Knight of the Golden Fleece, 1858
- Grand Cross of the Royal Hungarian Order of St. Stephen, 1877

Foreign

- Baden:
  - Knight of the House Order of Fidelity, 1873
  - Grand Cross of the Zähringer Lion, 1873
- Bavaria: Knight of St. Hubert, in Diamonds, 1868
- Belgium: Grand Cordon of the Order of Leopold, 1880 – wedding gift
- Brazil: Grand Cross of the Southern Cross
- Denmark: Knight of the Elephant, 24 November 1873
- (Saxe-Coburg and Gotha) (Duchy of Saxe-Altenburg) (Saxe-Meiningen) Ernestine duchies: Grand Cross of the Saxe-Ernestine House Order
- France: Grand Cross of the Legion of Honour
- Greece: Grand Cross of the Redeemer
- (Grand Duchy of Hesse) Hesse and by Rhine: Grand Cross of the Ludwig Order, 21 August 1865
- Italy: Knight of the Annunciation, 6 May 1881
  - (Duchy of Parma) Parmese Ducal Family: Grand Cross of the Constantinian Order of St. George
  - (Tuscany) Tuscan Grand Ducal Family: Grand Cross of St. Joseph
- Sovereign Military Order of Malta: Bailiff Grand Cross of Honour and Devotion
- Japan: Grand Cordon of the Order of the Chrysanthemum, 14 February 1881
- Mecklenburg: Grand Cross of the Wendish Crown, with Crown in Ore
- Mexican Empire: Grand Cross of the Mexican Eagle, 1865
- Montenegro: Grand Cross of the Order of Prince Danilo I
- (Duchy of Nassau) Nassau Ducal Family: Knight of the Gold Lion of Nassau
- Netherlands: Grand Cross of the Netherlands Lion
- Ottoman Empire: Order of Osmanieh, 1st Class
- Tunisia: Husainid Family Order, in Diamonds
- Persia: Order of the August Portrait, in Diamonds, 1 August 1873
- Portugal: Grand Cross of the Sash of the Two Orders
- Prussia:
  - Knight of the Black Eagle, 21 August 1864
  - Grand Commander's Cross of the Royal House Order of Hohenzollern
- Russia:
  - Knight of St. Andrew, 1878
  - Knight of St. Alexander Nevsky
  - Knight of the White Eagle
  - Knight of St. Anna, 1st Class
  - Knight of St. Stanislaus, 1st Class
- Romania: Grand Cross of the Star of Romania
- San Marino: Grand Cross of the Order of San Marino
- Serbia: Grand Cross of the Cross of Takovo
- Saxe-Weimar-Eisenach: Grand Cross of the White Falcon, 1873
- Saxony: Knight of the Rue Crown, 1876
- (Thailand) Siam:
  - Grand Cross of the White Elephant
  - Grand Cross of the Crown of Siam
- Spain: Grand Cross of the Order of Charles III, 5 June 1875
- Sweden-Norway: Knight of the Seraphim, 15 April 1879
- United Kingdom:
  - Stranger Knight Companion of the Garter, 20 June 1887
  - Queen Victoria Golden Jubilee Medal in gold, 1887
- Württemberg: Grand Cross of the Württemberg Crown, 1873

== Ancestors ==
Ancestors of Rudolf, Crown Prince of Austria

8. Francis II, Holy Roman Emperor
4. Archduke Franz Karl of Austria
9. Princess Maria Theresa of Naples and Sicily
2. Franz Joseph I of Austria
10. Maximilian I Joseph of Bavaria
5. Princess Sophie of Bavaria
11. Princess Caroline of Baden
1. Rudolf, Crown Prince of Austria
12. Duke Pius August in Bavaria
6. Duke Maximilian Joseph in Bavaria
13. Princess Amélie Louise of Arenberg
3. Duchess Elisabeth in Bavaria
14. Maximilian I Joseph of Bavaria (= 10)
7. Princess Ludovika of Bavaria
15. Princess Caroline of Baden (= 11)

== Gallery ==
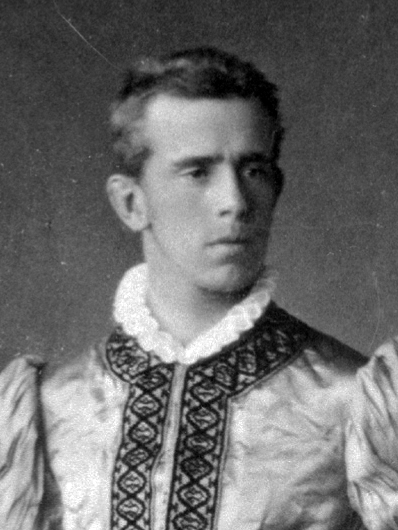
Crown Prince Rudolf during his early adulthood, c. 1879.

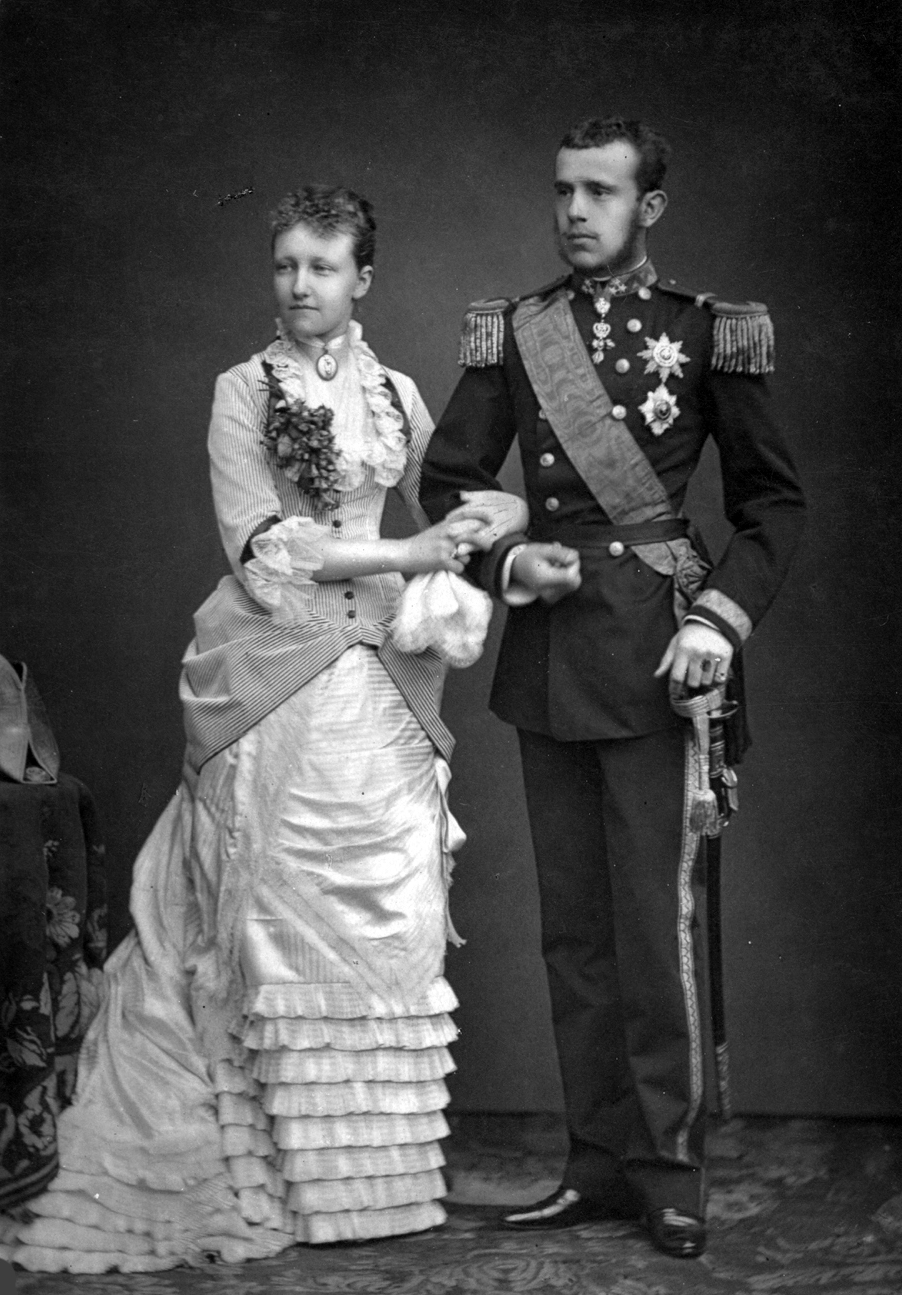
Official engagement photo of Crown Prince Rudolf and Princess Stéphanie of Belgium, 1881.

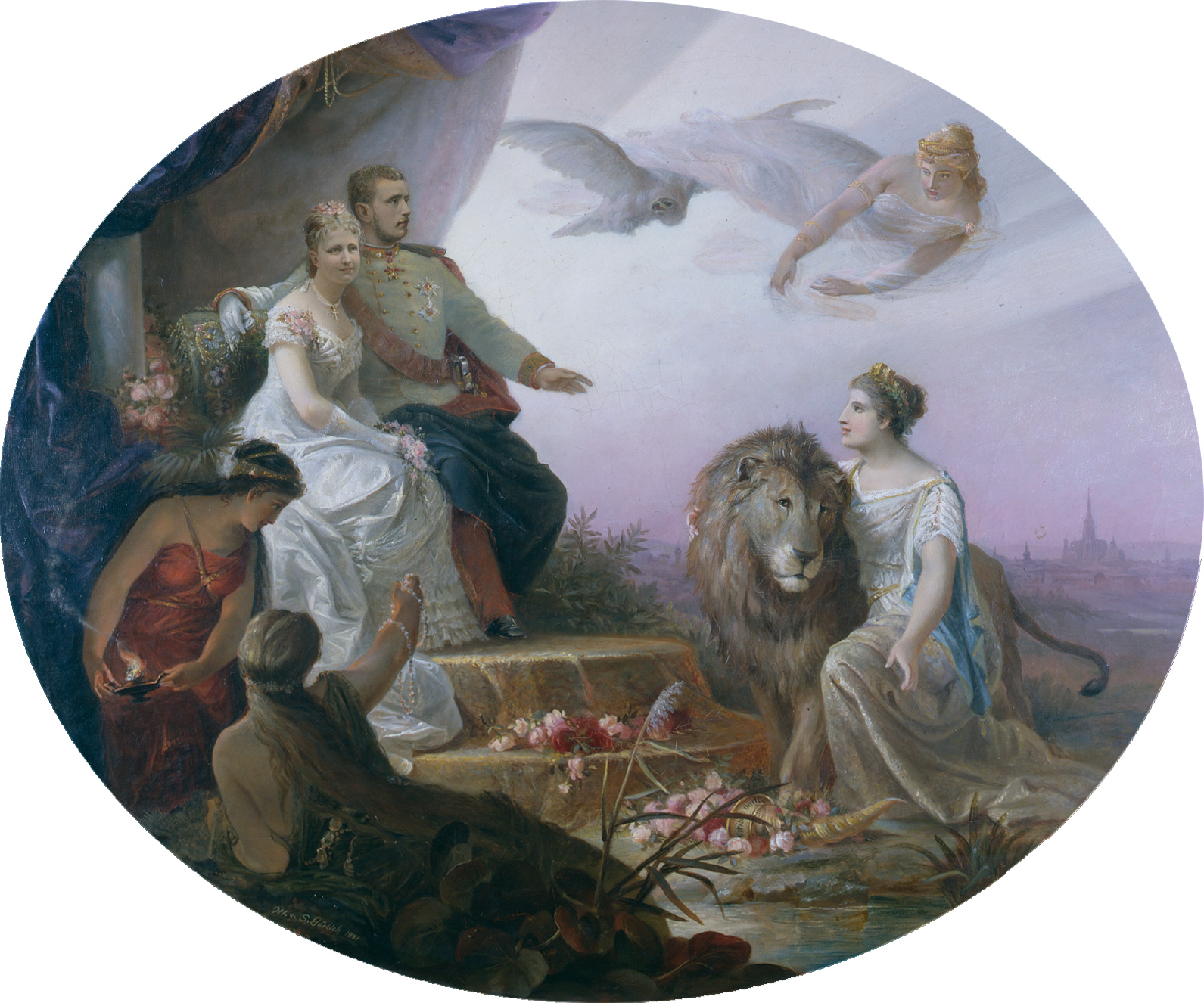
Painting "Allegory on the betrothal of Crown Prince Rudolf and Stephanie of Belgium" by Sophia and Marie Görlich, dated 1881.

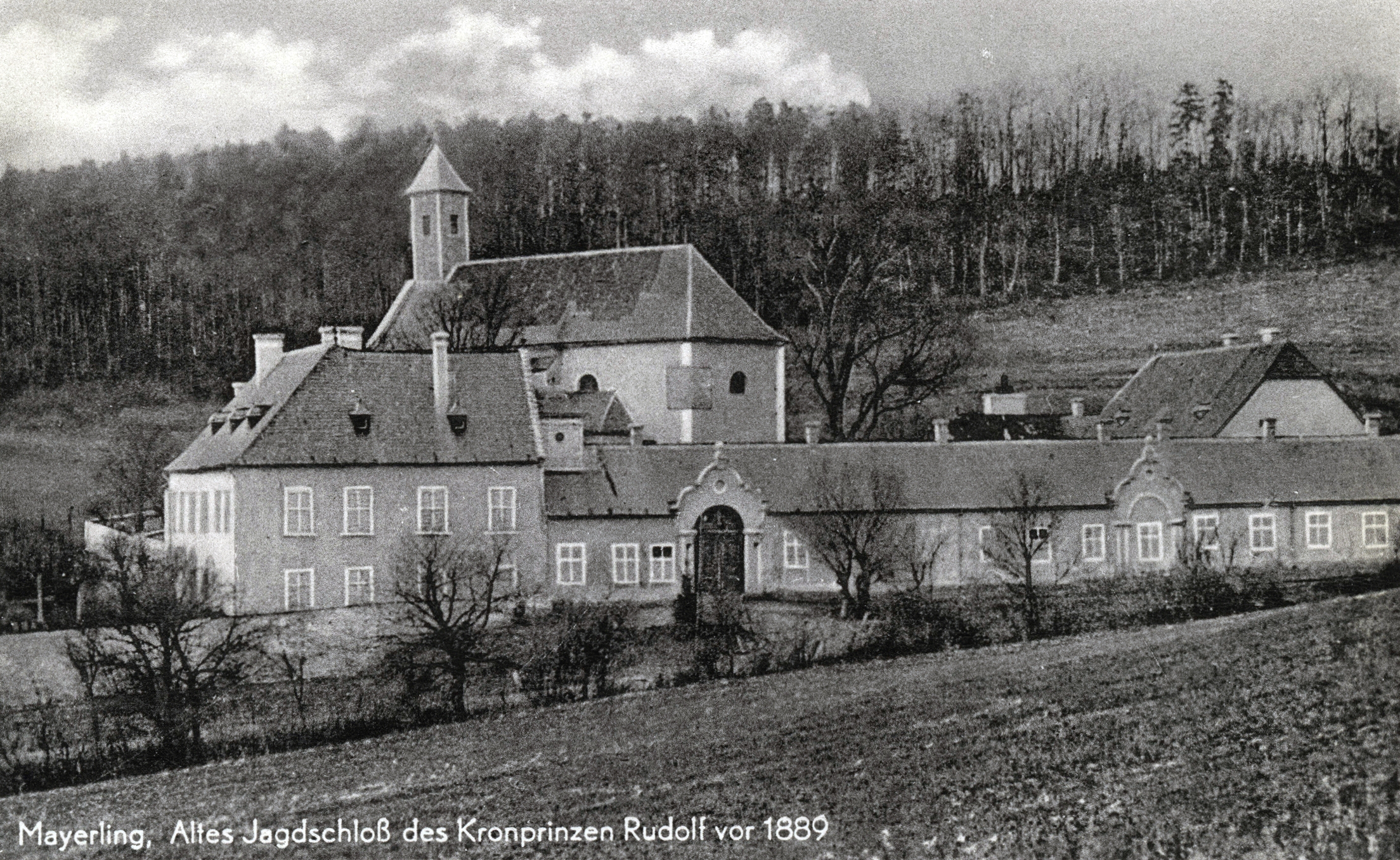
Mayerling Lodge as it appeared before Crown Prince Rudolf's death there in 1889.

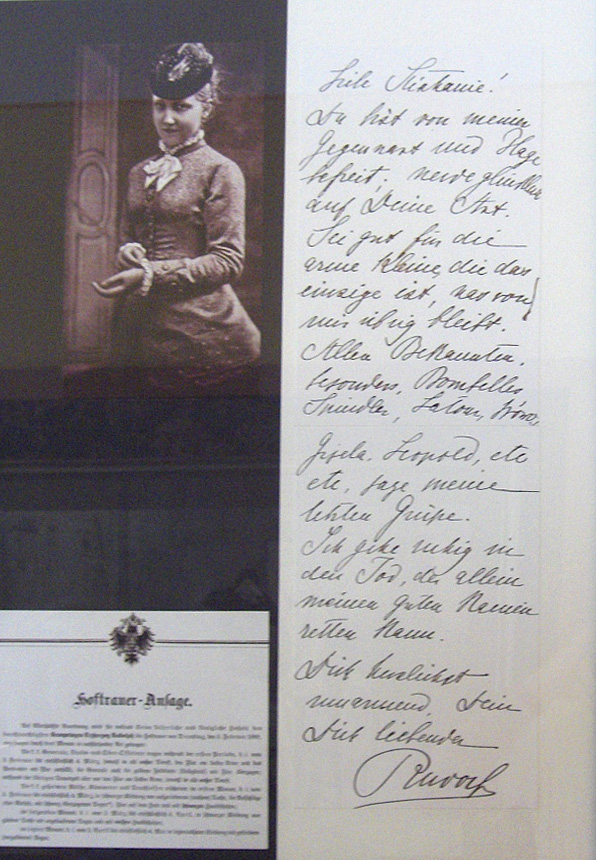
Crown Prince Rudolf's letter of farewell to his wife.

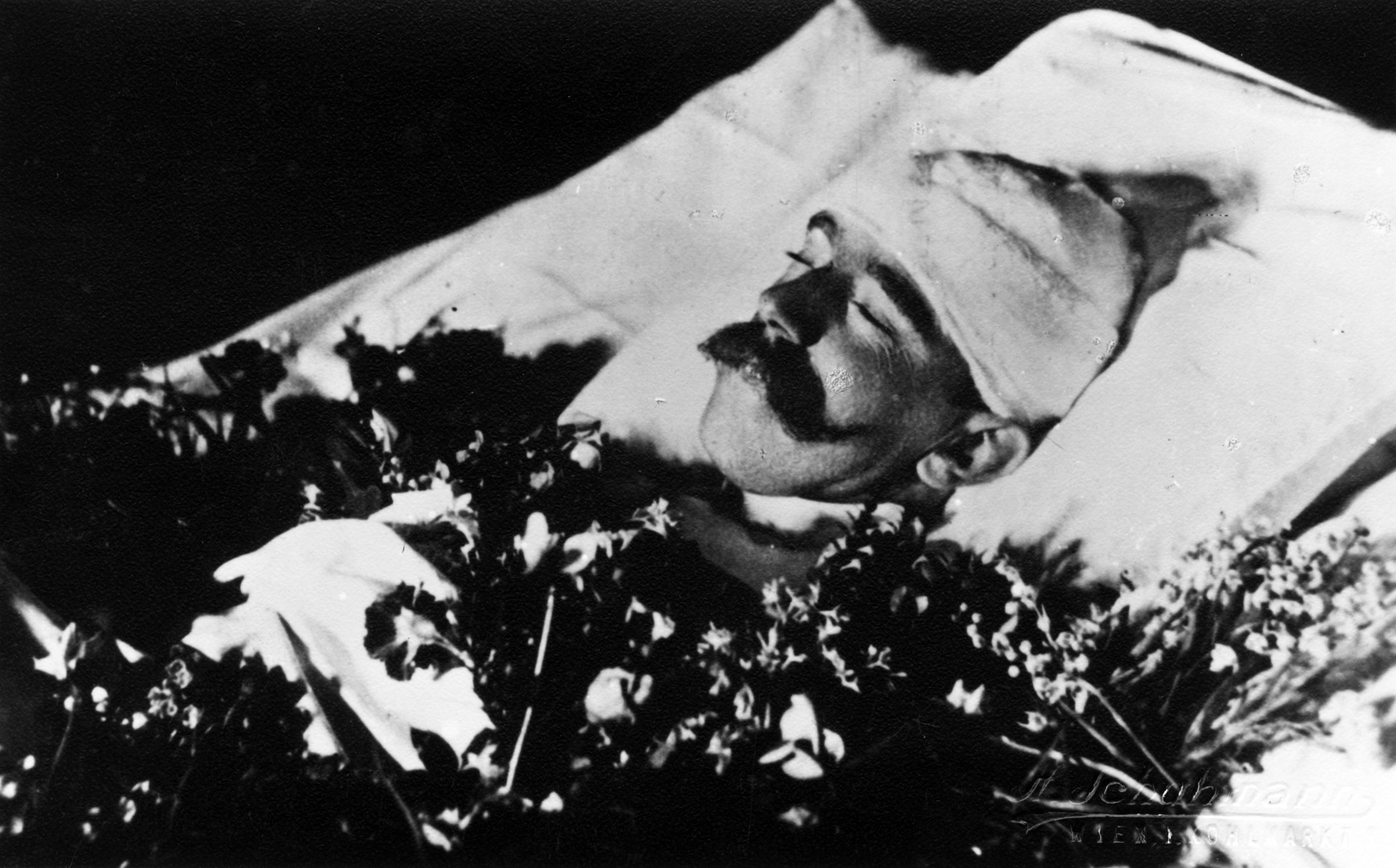
Crown Prince Rudolf placed in a bed for private viewing by his family at the Hofburg palace in Vienna. His head had to be bandaged in order to cover gunshot wounds. When he later lay-in-state, his skull was reconstructed using wax so that his appearance was normal.

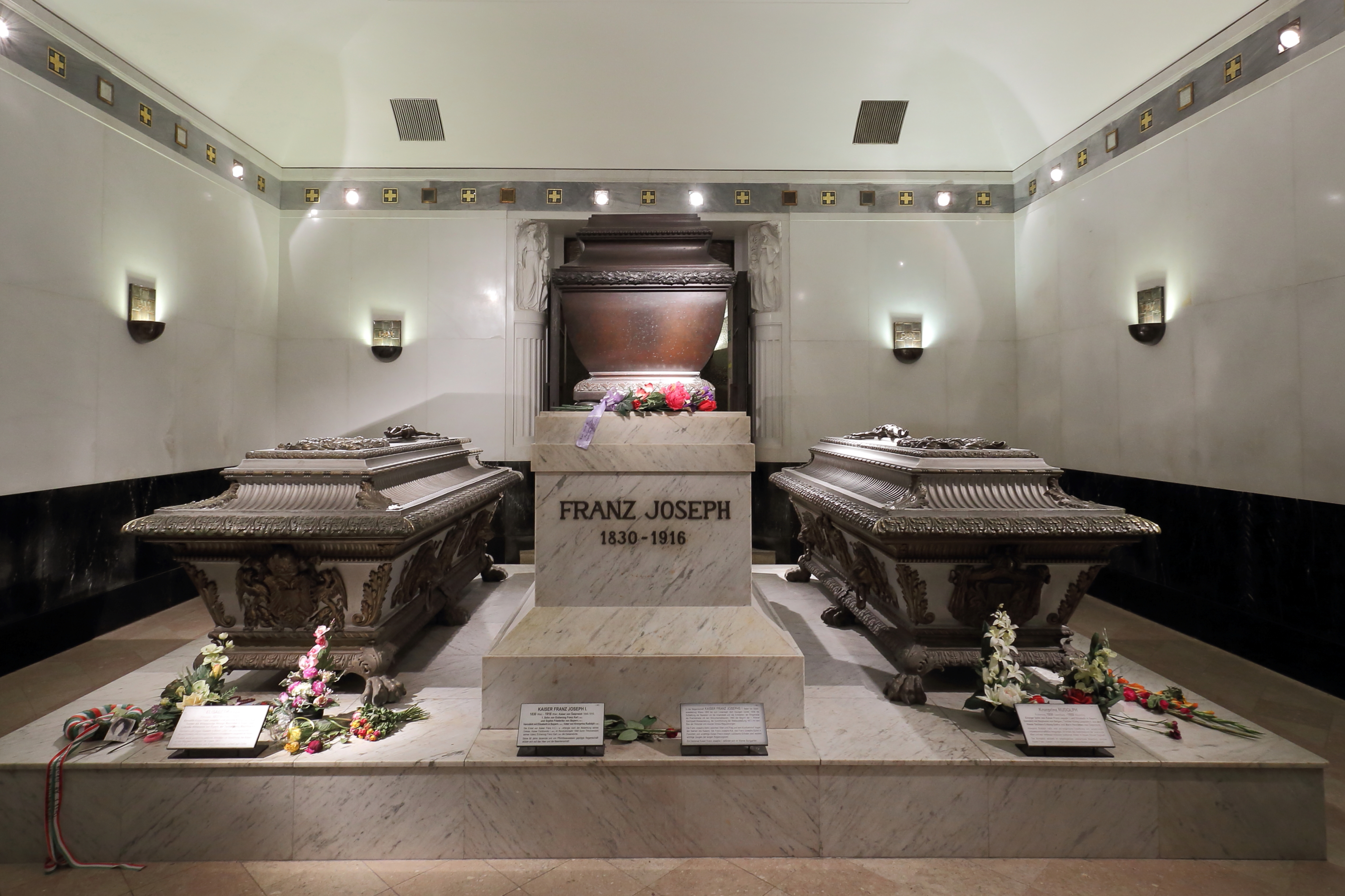
Crown Prince Rudolf's coffin lies to the right of his parents' coffins in the Imperial Crypt in Vienna.

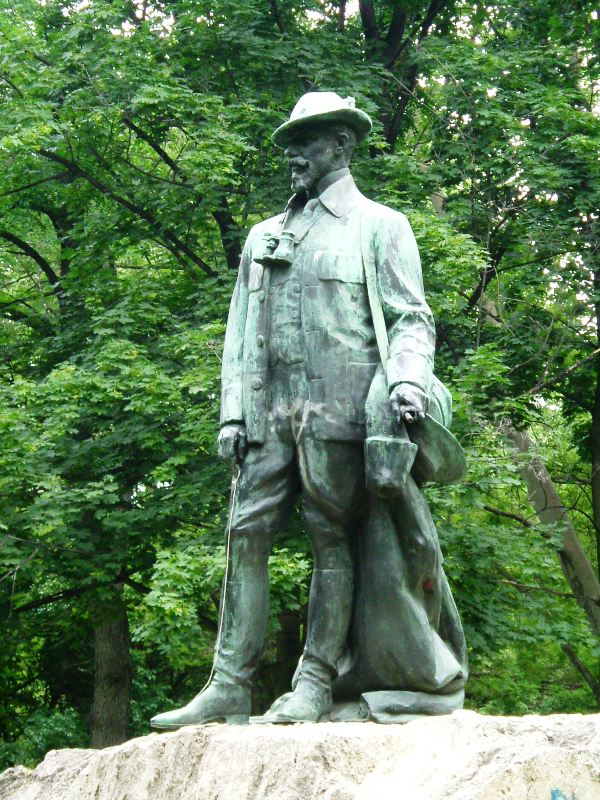
Statue in memory of Crown Prince Rudolf in the City Park of Budapest.

== See also ==
- Lake Rudolf, an earlier name for Lake Turkana, Kenya
- Mount Rudolf and Rudolf Glacier, New Zealand
- Rudolf Island, northernmost island of the Franz Josef Archipelago, Russia
- Alma Vetsera Hayne, a New York socialite who claimed to be the daughter of Rudolf and Mary Vetsera
- List of heirs to the Austrian throne

== Notes ==
Rudolf von Habsburg-Lorraine House of Habsburg-Lorraine Cadet branch of the House of Habsburg Born: 21 August 1858 Died: 30 January 1889
Austro-Hungarian royalty
Preceded by Ferdinand Maximilian	Heir to the Austrian throne 21 August 1858 – 30 January 1889	Succeeded by Karl Ludwig
