= Baroness Mary Vetsera =

Mistress to Crown Prince Rudolf of Austria (1871–1889)

Mary Vetsera
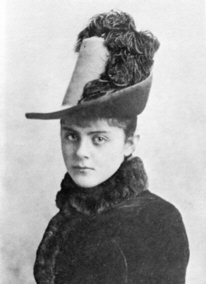
- Mary Vetsera in 1888
- Born: Marie Alexandrine Freiin von Vetsera; 19 March 1871; Vienna, Austria-Hungary
- Died: 30 January 1889 (aged 17); Mayerling, Lower Austria, Austria-Hungary
- Burial place: Heiligenkreuz, Austria
- Education: Salesian Institute for Daughters of the Nobility
- Known for: Mistress of Rudolf, Crown Prince of Austria, involvement in the Mayerling incident
- Title: Freiin von Vetsera
- Parent(s): Albin Freiherr von Vetsera; Helene Baltazzi

Baroness Marie Alexandrine "Mary" von Vetsera (19 March 1871 – 30 January 1889) was an Austrian noblewoman and the mistress of Rudolf, Crown Prince of Austria. Vetsera and the crown prince were found dead at his hunting lodge in Mayerling on 30 January 1889, following an apparent joint suicide, which is known as the Mayerling incident.

== Family and early life ==
Marie Alexandrine "Mary" Freiin von Vetsera was born on 19 March 1871 as the third child and second daughter of Albin Freiherr von Vetsera (1825–1887), an Austrian diplomat from Pozsony, Kingdom of Hungary (present day Bratislava, Slovakia), and his wife, born Eleni Hélène Baltazzi (1847–1925), a member of a wealthy noble family from Chíos, a Greek island that was then part of the Ottoman Empire. Albin Vetsera had been the guardian of the orphaned Baltazzi children and married the eldest daughter. He was raised to the rank of Freiherr in 1870 by Emperor Franz Joseph. Mary had three siblings, Ladislaus "Laci" (1865–1881), Johanna "Hanna" (1868–1901), and Franz Albin "Fery" (1872–1915).

Freifrau von Vetsera's main goal was to advance socially, for which she had the support of the imperial family, even though she did not have the right to visit the court. She wanted to break out from the parvenu status she had as the wife of a newly made noble, and for this, she needed her daughters to marry into the best possible families. Vetsera was thus raised in a strict household under the pressure of having to climb socially and fulfill the dreams of her mother. For education, she was sent to the Institute for Daughters of the Nobility in the Salesian convent in Vienna's third district. When she came of age, her mother threw parties and tried to be invited to court so that she could find the best husband for her daughters. It seems that Vetsera had a strained relationship with her mother, confiding in a friend that "Mamma has no love for me... Ever since I was a little girl she has treated me like something she means to dispose of to the best advantage". During the winter of 1887, the Vetsera family travelled to Cairo, Khedivate of Egypt, because of the illness of the father. While there, Vetsera supposedly had an affair with a British officer.

== Relationship with Crown Prince Rudolf ==
In 1888, Vetsera became infatuated with Crown Prince Rudolf (1858–1889), a married man 13 years her senior, after returning from Cairo following the death of her father. In November of that year, she managed to meet him and soon they began an affair. She was 17 and he was 30. Upon finding out, her family reacted negatively: her sister Hanna called her foolish, and her mother Helene (who had known Rudolf's mother Empress Elisabeth from years before at horse races in Hungary, Bohemia and England) was enraged, accusing her of compromising herself and ruining the lives of all of her family members. Historian Lucy Coatman disputes Larisch's claims (who Georg Markus refers to), citing letters by Mary and from within the family which prove Helene and Hanna had no knowledge of Mary's affair with Rudolf until the tragedy occurred.

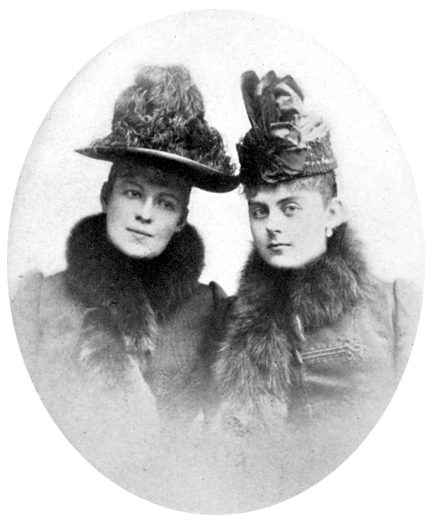
The last photograph of Mary (on the right), wearing the dress in which she was buried. On the left is Countess Marie Larisch von Moennich, a cousin of the crown prince who delivered some letters and messages between her and the crown prince.

Vetsera appears to have been deeply in love, maybe even thinking that she was a credible threat to her lover's wife, Crown Princess Stéphanie (1864–1945). Meanwhile, Rudolf was involved in a long-term relationship with actress Mizzi/Mitzi Kaspar (1864–1907). It was to Kaspar that Rudolf first proposed a suicide pact, to which she reacted with a laugh. Later, Kaspar went to the police, concerned for the safety of the heir to the throne, but she was dismissed and told not to interfere with imperial affairs.

== Death ==
After Kaspar had refused to die with him, the crown prince proposed a suicide pact to Vetsera. While he probably just did not want to die alone, Vetsera seemingly perceived the plans as the dramatic union-in-death of star-crossed lovers. She wrote: "If I could give him my life I should be glad to do it, for what does life mean for me?" In her farewell note to her sister, she wrote "we are both going blissfully into the uncertain beyond."

On 29 January 1889, the imperial couple hosted a family dinner party before leaving for Budapest, Kingdom of Hungary. The crown prince excused himself and travelled to the hunting lodge in Mayerling, where he arranged for a day of shooting for 30 January. When his valet, Johann Loschek, knocked on his door to wake him up early in the morning, he received no answer. Rudolf's hunting companion, Graf Joseph von Hoyos-Stichstenstein, joined him, and they both tried to open the door.

In the end, Loschek smashed in a door panel with a hammer and opened the door from the inside. In the dark room, he found the crown prince sitting motionless by the side of the bed, leaning forward and bleeding from the mouth. Vetsera's body lay on the bed, with rigor mortis having already set in.

== Aftermath ==
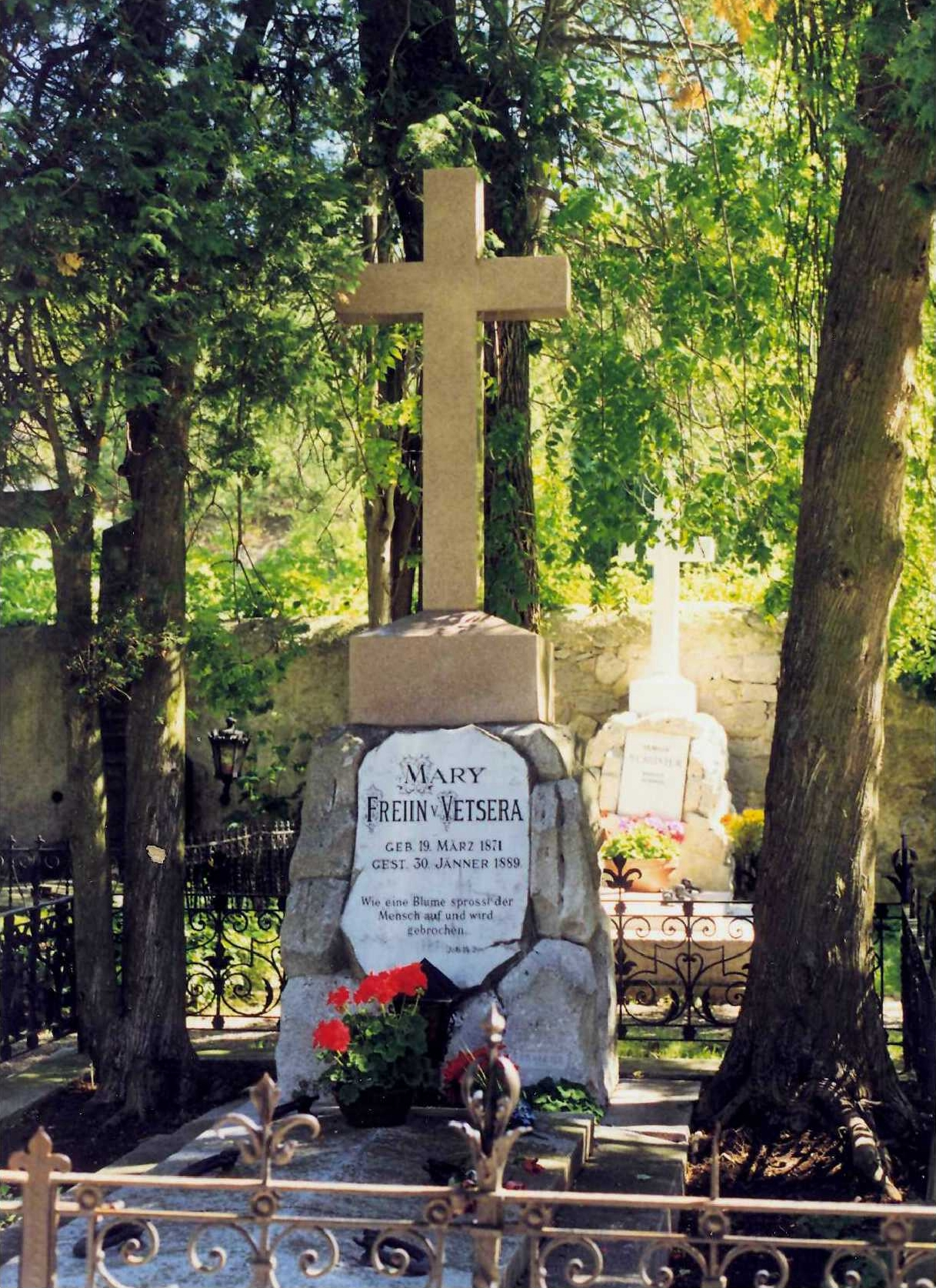
Mary Vetsera's grave in Heiligenkreuz

Vetsera's maternal uncles were quickly summoned to remove their niece's body and bury it as discreetly as possible. Even her mother was forbidden to attend the ceremony. The body was taken to the closest cemetery, the one at the Cistercian monastery in Heiligenkreuz. As her death was thought to be a suicide, her uncles had a hard time persuading the abbot to give permission for a Christian burial, eventually convincing him that she had only committed it because of momentary insanity.

On 16 May 1889, Vetsera's mother had her daughter exhumed. Vetsera's remains were transferred from the original wooden coffin to a copper one and reburied.

The official story of murder-suicide was unchallenged until after the Second World War. After Soviet troops had disturbed Vetsera's grave, and when it was being repaired in 1955, the monks found a small skeleton inside the coffin, with no apparent bullet holes in its skull.

In 1959, physician Gerd Holler and a member of the Vetsera family, accompanied by other specialists, inspected her remains. The bones were in disarray, but shoes and long black hair were found in the coffin. Upon careful examination, Holler found no sign of a bullet wound on the skeleton. The skull cavity showed signs of trauma, which could have been inflicted by the grave robbers, or could indicate that Vetsera had died from a blow to her skull and not by the hands of the crown prince.

Holler claimed he petitioned the Holy See to inspect their archives of the incident, including records of the investigation by an apostolic nuncio, Archbishop Luigi Galimberti, who had found that only one bullet was fired. Lacking forensic evidence of a second bullet, Holler advanced the theory that Vetsera died accidentally, probably as the result of an abortion, and that Rudolf then shot himself. Lucy Coatman, who is planning a biography of Vetsera, argues against this, citing a letter written by Mary shortly before the Mayerling incident. In it, Mary confirms that she lost her virginity to Rudolf on 13 January 1889. Coatman states that this proves Mary could not have died of a botched abortion, as a pregnancy would not have been evident at the time of their deaths.

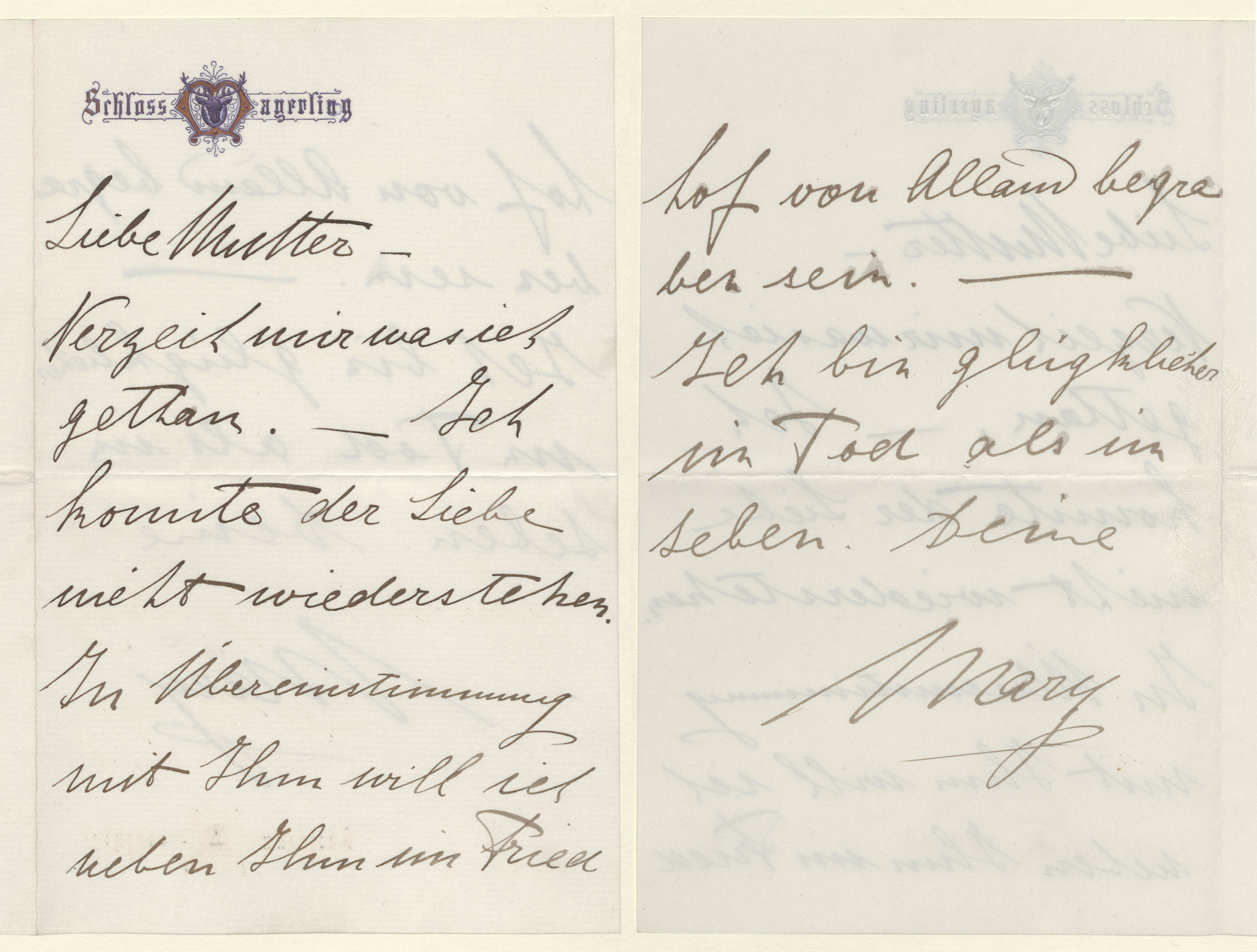
Vetsera's farewell letter to her mother

In 1991, Vetsera's remains were disturbed again, this time by Helmut Flatzelsteiner, a Linz furniture dealer obsessed with the Mayerling incident who removed them for a forensic examination at his expense, which took place in February 1993. Flatzelsteiner told the examiners that the remains belonged to a relative killed 100 years earlier who may have been shot in the head or stabbed. One expert thought that this might be possible, but since the skull was in a state of advanced decomposition, it could not be confirmed. Other experts confirmed the presence of the remains of a bullet, as well as the hair being singed from the impact.

When Flatzelsteiner approached a journalist to sell both the story and the skeleton, the police became involved. Flatzelsteiner confessed and surrendered Vetsera's remains, which were sent to the Legal Medical Institute in Vienna for further examination. Forensic experts found the bones were indeed 100 years old and those of a young woman aged around 20, but since part of the skull was missing, it could not be determined if there had ever been a bullet hole. Vetsera's bones were re-interred on 28 October 1993.

On 31 July 2015, the Austrian National Library obtained copies of Vetsera's farewell letters to her mother and other family members which had been found in a bank safe deposit box, where they had been placed in 1926. Written in Mayerling shortly before the deaths, they state clearly that Vetsera was preparing to die alongside Rudolf out of love for him. They were made available to scholars and exhibited to the public in 2016.
