= Kochert =

Kochert is a surname.

- Bibiana Maria Köchert (1942–1996), Austrian-American film, television, and stage actress
- Gotfrid Köchert (1918–1986), Austrian sailor
- Stéphanie Kochert (born 1975), French politician

== See also ==
- A. E. Köchert, jewellers
