= Empress Elisabeth of Austria =

Habsburg consort from 1854 to 1898

Elisabeth
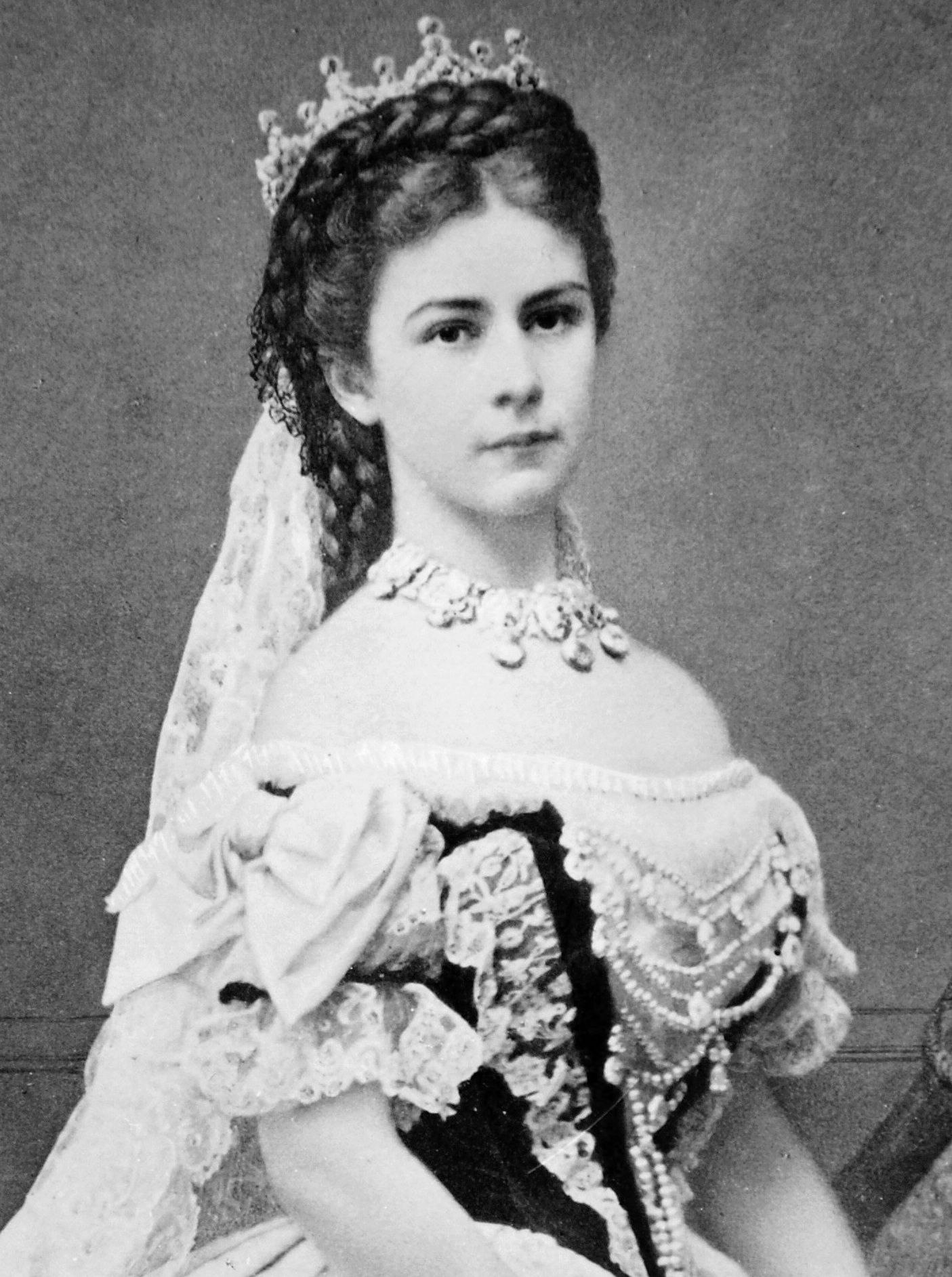
- Formal portrait, 1867

Empress consort of Austria Queen consort of Hungary
- Tenure: 24 April 1854 – 10 September 1898
- Coronation: 8 June 1867; Matthias Church (as Queen of Hungary)

Queen consort of Lombardy-Venetia
- Tenure: 24 April 1854 – 12 October 1866
- Born: Duchess Elisabeth in Bavaria; 24 December 1837; Munich, Bavaria
- Died: 10 September 1898 (aged 60); Geneva, Switzerland
- Cause of death: Assassination by stabbing
- Burial: 17 September 1898; Imperial Crypt
- Spouse: Franz Joseph I of Austria (m. 1854)
- Issue: Archduchess Sophie; Gisela, Princess of Bavaria; Rudolf, Crown Prince of Austria; Archduchess Marie Valerie
Names
- Elisabeth Amalie Eugenie
- House: Wittelsbach
- Father: Duke Maximilian Joseph in Bavaria
- Mother: Princess Ludovika of Bavaria
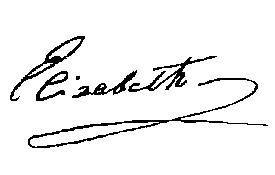
- Signature

Elisabeth (Elisabeth Amalie Eugenie; German: [eˈliːzaˌbɛt aˈmaːliə ɔʏˈɡeːniə]; 24 December 1837 – 10 September 1898), nicknamed Sisi, (Note: Sometimes also erroneously spelled as "Sissi". Although the pet name of the empress was always spelled "Sisi" (and never "Sissi"), this incorrect version of her name persisted in the works about her that followed.) was Empress of Austria and Queen of Hungary from her marriage to Franz Joseph I on 24 April 1854 until her assassination in 1898.

Elisabeth was born into the Bavarian House of Wittelsbach but enjoyed an informal upbringing before marrying her first cousin, Emperor Franz Joseph I, at 16. The marriage thrust her into the much more formal Habsburg court life, for which she was unprepared and which she found suffocating. The couple had four children: Sophie, Gisela, Rudolf, and Marie Valerie. Early in her marriage, Elisabeth was at odds with her aunt and mother-in-law, Archduchess Sophie, who took over the rearing of Elisabeth's children. The birth of a son, Rudolf, improved Elisabeth's standing at court, but her health suffered under the strain. As a result, she would often visit Hungary for its more relaxed environment. She came to develop a deep kinship with Hungary and helped to bring about the dual monarchy of Austria-Hungary in 1867.

The death of Crown Prince Rudolf and his mistress Baroness Mary Vetsera in a murder–suicide at his hunting lodge at Mayerling in 1889 was a blow from which Elisabeth never fully recovered. She withdrew from court duties and travelled widely, unaccompanied by her family. In 1890, she had the palace Achilleion, named after the Greek hero Achilles, built on the Greek island of Corfu. The palace featured an elaborate Greek mythological motif and served as a refuge, which Elisabeth visited often. She was obsessively concerned with maintaining her youthful figure and beauty, developing a restrictive diet and wearing extremely tightlaced corsets to keep her waist looking very small.

While travelling in Geneva in 1898, Elisabeth was fatally stabbed in the heart by an Italian anarchist named Luigi Lucheni. Her tenure of 44 years was the longest of any Austrian empress.

== Duchess in Bavaria ==
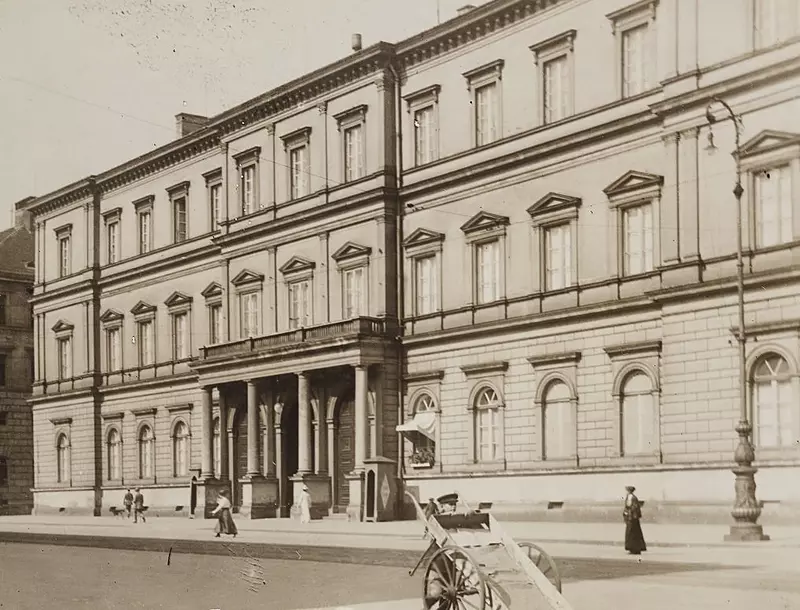
Herzog-Max-Palais in Munich where she was born

Elisabeth Amalie Eugenie was born on 24 December 1837 in the Herzog-Max-Palais in Munich, Bavaria. She was the third child and second daughter of Duke Maximilian Joseph in Bavaria and Princess Ludovika of Bavaria, the half-sister of King Ludwig I of Bavaria. Maximilian was considered peculiar; he loved circuses and traveled the Bavarian countryside to escape his duties. The family's homes were the Herzog-Max-Palais in Munich during winter and Possenhofen Castle in the summer months, far from the protocols of court. Sisi and her siblings grew up in an unrestrained, unstructured environment; she often skipped her lessons to go riding in the countryside.

In 1853, Archduchess Sophie, the domineering mother of 23-year-old Emperor Franz Joseph I, preferring a niece to a stranger for her daughter-in-law, arranged a meeting between her son and her sister Princess Ludovika's eldest daughter, Duchess Helene ("Néné"). Although the couple had never met, Franz Joseph's obedience was taken for granted by the Archduchess, who was once described as "the only man in the Hofburg" for her authoritarian manner.

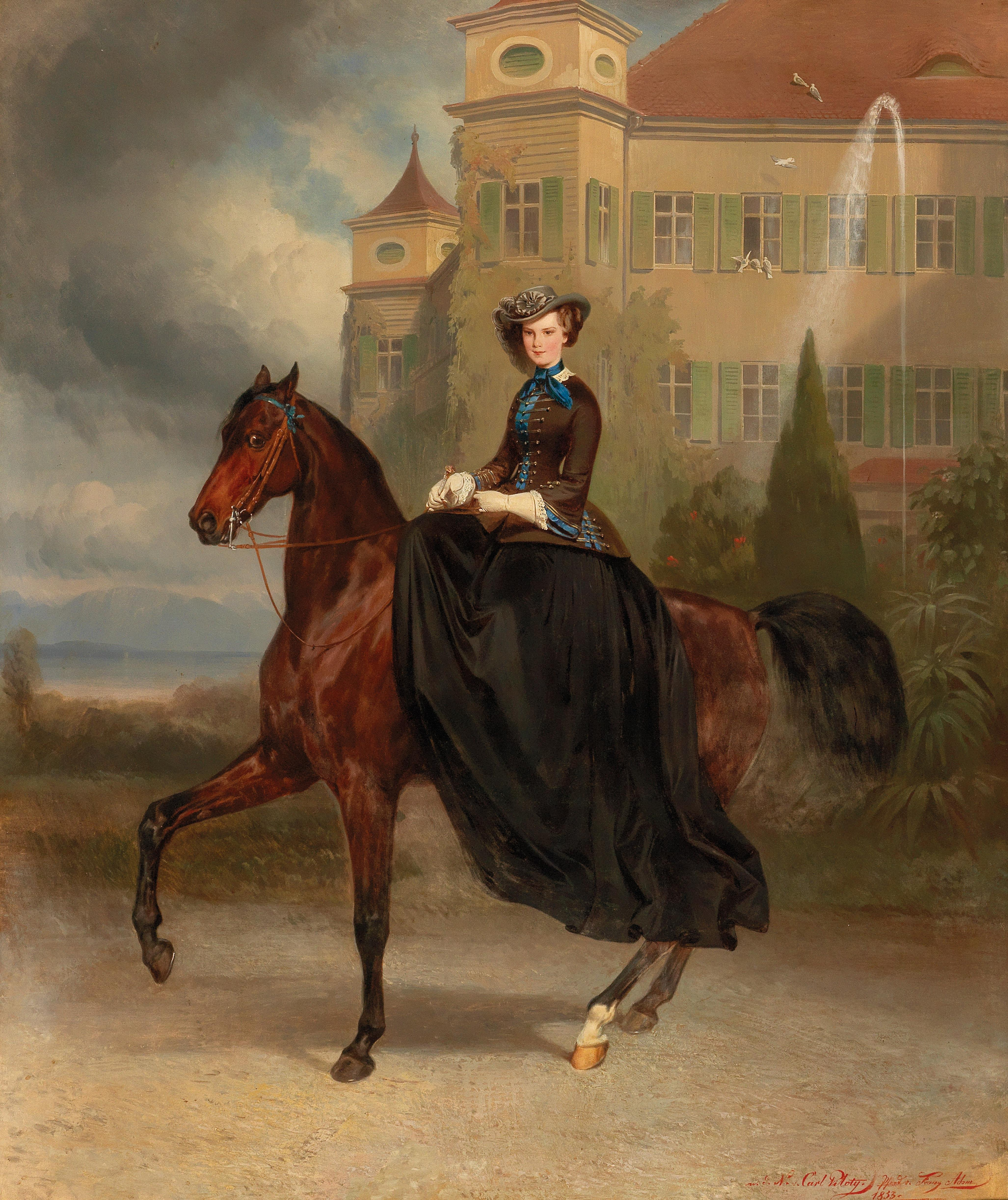
Equestrian portrait of Elisabeth at Possenhofen Castle, age 15 (1853)

Princess Ludovika and Duchess Helene were invited to journey to the resort of Bad Ischl, Upper Austria to receive his formal proposal of marriage. Ludovika also had the then-15-year-old Sisi accompany them, as Sisi had been mourning the recent death of the young Count she had loved, and had fallen into a lengthy depression. Ludovika hoped the change of scenery would cheer her up. Additionally, Archduke Karl Ludwig, Franz Joseph's second younger brother, would also be joining the Imperial family. Karl Ludwig and Sisi had formed a close friendship in childhood, exchanging letters and gifts. Her mother hoped them seeing each other again would end with a possible engagement for Sisi.

The Duchesses traveled from Munich in several coaches, but arrived later than planned due to headache prone Ludovika enduring an episode. The Duchess had to interrupt their journey to allow her time to recover, causing the coaches to get separated and the one with their gala dresses never arrived. On their way to Bad Ischl, they visited Leopoldskron Palace where Theresa, the Queen Dowager of Bavaria, was in mourning for her brother Georg, so they were dressed in black and unable to don more suitable clothing before meeting the young Emperor. While black did not suit 18-year-old Helene's dark coloring, it made her younger sister's fairer looks more striking.

Helene was a pious, quiet young woman, and while she and Franz Joseph felt ill at ease in each other's company, he was instantly infatuated with her younger sister. He did not propose to Helene, but instead, he defied his mother and informed her that if he could not have Elisabeth, he would not marry at all. Five days later, their betrothal was officially announced. The couple were married eight months later in Vienna, at the Augustinerkirche, on 24 April 1854. The marriage was finally consummated three days later, and Elisabeth received a dower equal to US$240,000 as of 2015.

== Empress of Austria ==
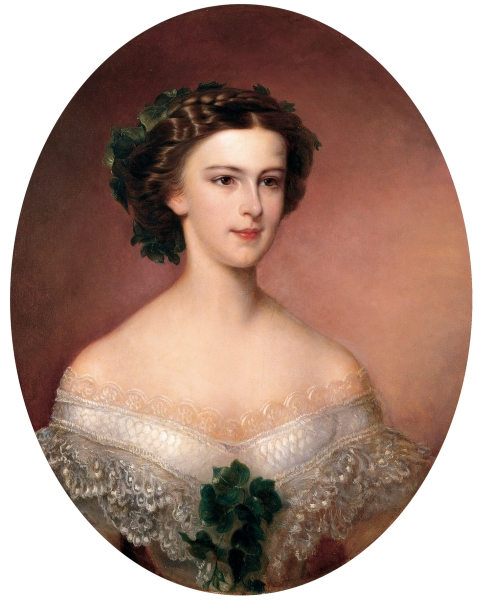
The young Elisabeth shortly after becoming Austrian Empress, by Amanda Bergstedt (1855)

After enjoying an informal, unstructured childhood, Elisabeth, who was shy and introverted by nature, and more so among the stifling formality of Habsburg court life, had difficulty adapting to the Hofburg and its rigid protocols and strict etiquette. Within a few weeks, Elisabeth started to display health problems. She experienced fits of coughing and became anxious and frightened whenever she had to descend a narrow or steep staircase.

Early in her marriage she was surprised to learn that she was pregnant; she gave birth to her first child, daughter Sophie Friederike Dorothea Maria Josepha (1855–1857), just 10 months after her wedding. The elder Archduchess Sophie, who often referred to Elisabeth as "a silly young mother", not only named the child after herself without consulting the mother, but she took complete charge of the baby, refusing to allow Elisabeth to breastfeed or otherwise care for her own child. When a second daughter, Gisela Louise Marie (1856–1932), was born a year later, the Archduchess took this baby away from Elisabeth as well.

The fact that she had not produced a male heir made Elisabeth increasingly unwanted in the palace. One day, she found a pamphlet on her desk with the following words underlined:

...The natural destiny of a Queen is to give an heir to the throne. If the Queen is so fortunate as to provide the State with a Crown Prince this should be the end of her ambition – she should by no means meddle with the government of an Empire, the care of which is not a task for women... If the Queen bears no sons, she is merely a foreigner in the State, and a very dangerous foreigner, too. For as she can never hope to be looked on kindly here, and must always expect to be sent back whence she came, so will she always seek to win the King by other than natural means; she will struggle for position and power by intrigue and the sowing of discord, to the mischief of the King, the nation, and the Empire...

Her mother-in-law is generally considered to be the source of the malicious pamphlet although there is no evidence supporting that claim. The accusation of political meddling referred to Elisabeth's influence on her husband regarding his Italian and Hungarian subjects. When she traveled to Italy with him, he granted amnesty to a number of political prisoners at her suggestion.

=== First visit to Hungary ===
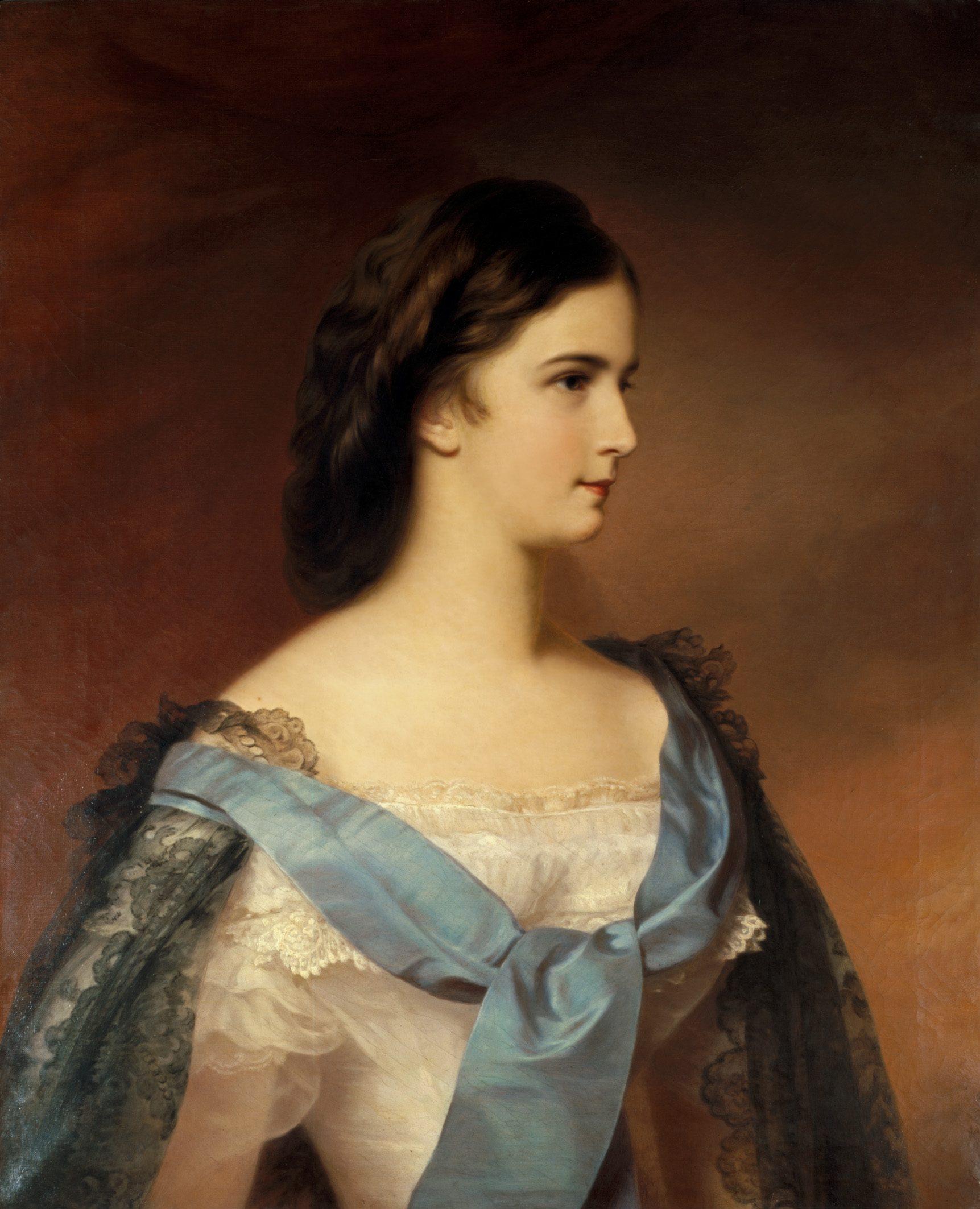
Portrait of Empress Elisabeth, 1857 aged 19

In 1857, Elisabeth visited Hungary for the first time with her husband and two daughters, and it left a deep and lasting impression upon her, which many historians attribute to the fact that in Hungary, she found a welcome respite from the constraints of Austrian court life. It was "the first time that Elisabeth had met with men of character in Franz Joseph's realm, and she became acquainted with an aristocratic independence that scorned to hide its sentiments behind courtly forms of speech... She felt her innermost soul reach out in sympathy to the proud, steadfast people of this land..."

Unlike Archduchess Sophie, who despised the Hungarians, Elisabeth felt such an affinity for them that she began to learn Hungarian. In turn, the country reciprocated in its adoration of her. Writing about his visit to Hungary in 1934, Patrick Leigh Fermor notes that Elisabeth's picture was "framed on desks and tables and grand pianos", and that her love for Hungary and the Hungarians "was returned with interest and still declared, thirty-six years after her assassination, with all the ardour of Burke for Marie Antoinette."

This same trip proved tragic when both of Elisabeth's daughters became ill. While Gisela recovered quickly, two-year-old Sophie grew steadily weaker before finally succumbing to her illness and dying. It is generally assumed today that she died of typhus. Her death pushed Elisabeth, who was already prone to bouts of melancholy, into periods of heavy depression, which would haunt her for the rest of her life. She turned away from her living daughter and began to neglect her. In December 1857, Elisabeth became pregnant for the third time, and her mother, who had been concerned about her daughter's physical and mental health, hoped that this new pregnancy would help her recover.

=== Birth of a son ===
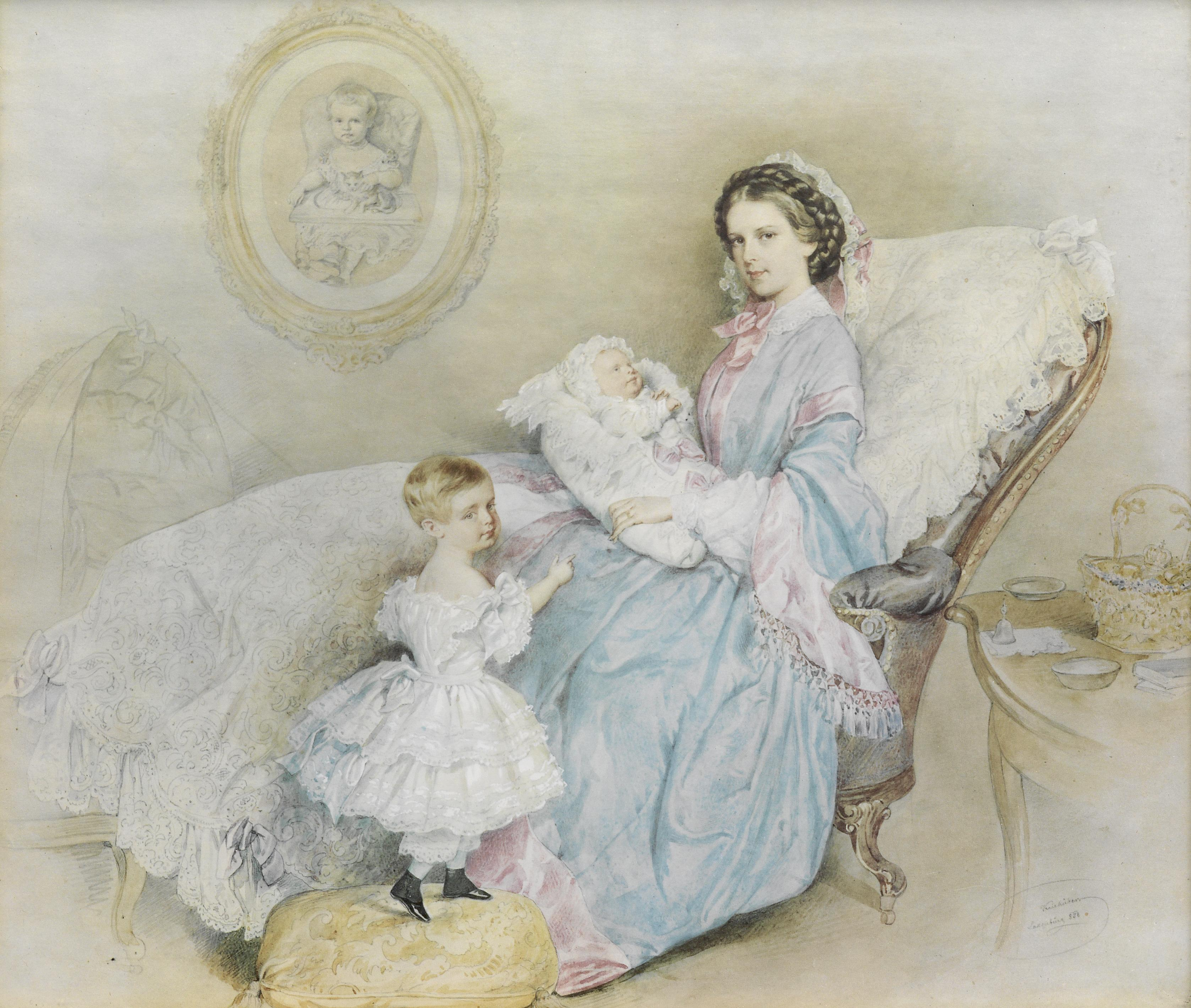
Empress Elisabeth with her two children and a portrait of the late Archduchess Sophie Friederike (1858)

On 21 August 1858, Elisabeth finally gave birth to an heir, Rudolf Franz Karl Josef (1858–1889). The 101-gun salute announcing the news to Vienna also signaled an increase in her influence at court. This, combined with her sympathy toward Hungary, made Elisabeth an ideal mediator between the Hungarians and the Emperor. Her interest in politics had developed as she matured; she was liberal-minded, and placed herself decisively on the Hungarian side in the increasing conflict of nationalities within the empire.

Elisabeth was a personal advocate for the Hungarian Count Gyula Andrássy, who also was rumored to be her lover. Whenever difficult negotiations broke off between the Hungarians and the court, she assisted in resuming them. During these protracted dealings, she suggested to the emperor that Andrássy be made premier of Hungary as part of a compromise, and in a forceful attempt to bring the two men together, strongly admonished her husband:

I have just had an interview with Andrássy. He set forth his views clearly and plainly. I quite understood them and arrived at the conclusion that if you would trust him – and trust him entirely – we might still be saved, not only Hungary, but the monarchy, too... I can assure you that you are not dealing with a man desirous of playing a part at any price or striving for a position; on the contrary, he is risking his present position, which is a fine one. But approaching shipwreck, he, too, is prepared to do all in his power to save it; what he possesses – his understanding and influence in the country – he will lay at your feet. For the last time I beg you in Rudolf's name not to lose this, at the last moment...
...If you say 'No', if at the last moment you are no longer willing to listen to disinterested counsels. Then... you will be relieved forever from my future... and nothing will remain to me but the consciousness that whatever may happen, I shall be able to say honestly to Rudolf one day: "I did everything in my power. Your misfortunes are not on my conscience."

When Elisabeth was still blocked from controlling her son's upbringing and education, she openly rebelled.

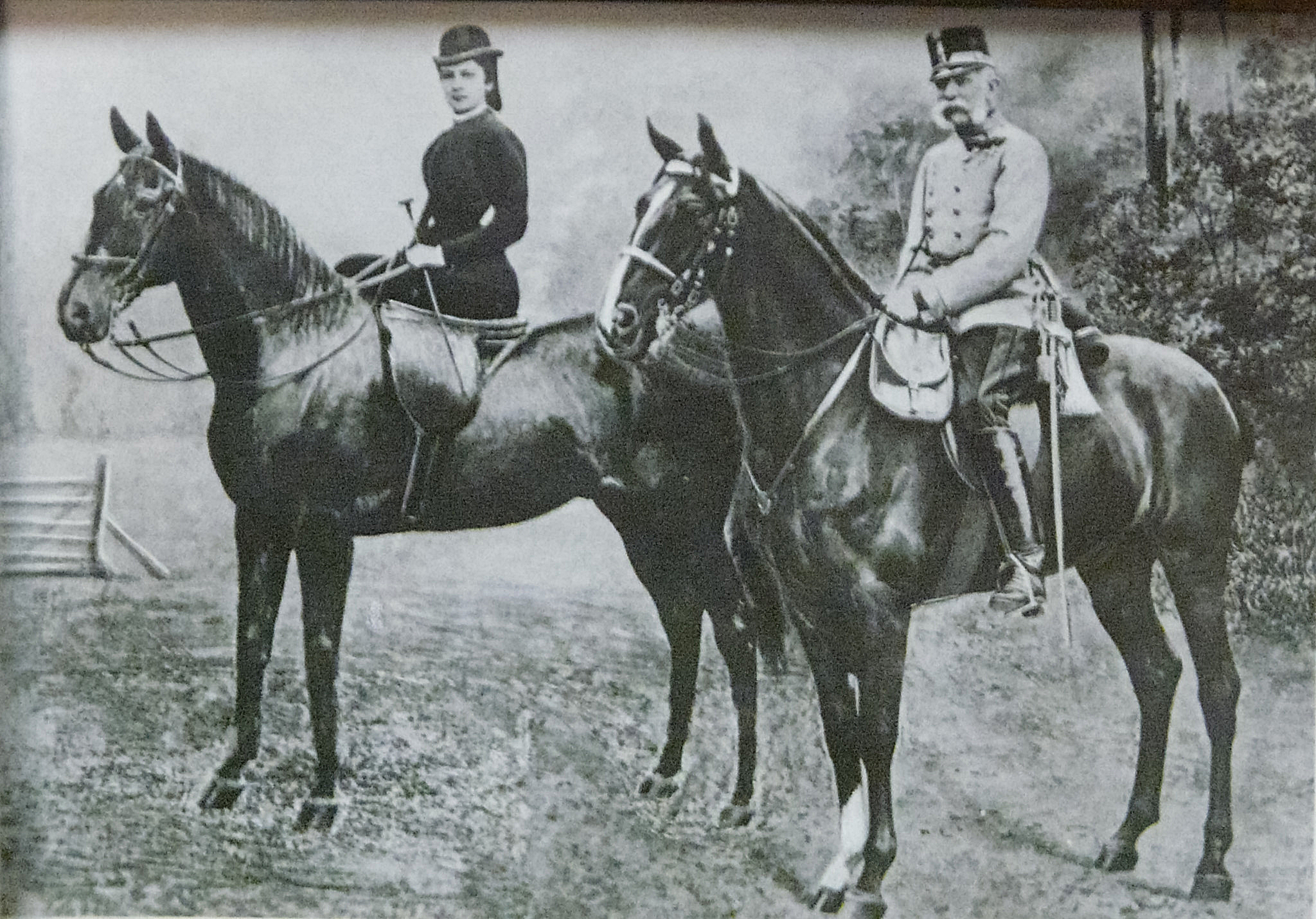
Empress Elisabeth and Emperor Franz Joseph

Due to her nervous attacks, fasting cures, severe exercise regime, and frequent fits of coughing, the state of her health had become so alarming that in October 1860, she was reported to suffer not only from green-sickness, but also from physical exhaustion. A serious lung complaint of "Lungenschwindsucht" (tuberculosis) was feared by Joseph Škoda, a lung specialist, who advised a stay on Madeira. During this time, the court was rife with malicious rumors that Franz Joseph was having a liaison with an actress named Frau Roll.

Elisabeth seized on the excuse and left her husband and children, to spend the winter in seclusion. Six months later, a mere four days after her return to Vienna, she again experienced coughing fits and fever. She ate hardly anything and slept badly, and Škoda observed a recurrence of her lung disease. A fresh rest cure was advised, this time on Corfu, where she improved almost immediately. If her illnesses were mostly psychosomatic, abating when she was removed from her husband and her duties, her eating habits were definitely causing physical problems as well. In 1862, she had not seen Vienna for about a year when her family physician, Fischer of Munich, examined her and observed serious anemia and signs of dropsy. Her feet were sometimes so swollen that she could walk only laboriously, and with the support of others. On medical advice, she went to Bad Kissingen for a cure. Elisabeth recovered quickly at the spa, but instead of returning home to assuage the gossip about her absence, she spent more time with her own family in Bavaria. She returned in August 1862, shortly before her husband's birthday, but immediately suffered from a violent migraine and vomited four times en route, which might support a theory that some of her complaints were stress-related and psychosomatic.

Rudolf was now four years old, and Franz Joseph hoped for another son to safeguard the succession. Fischer claimed that the health of the Empress would not permit another pregnancy, and she would need to visit Kissingen regularly for a cure. Elisabeth fell into her old pattern of escaping boredom and dull court protocol through frequent walking and riding, using her health as an excuse to avoid both official obligations and sexual intimacy. Preserving her youthful appearance was also an important influence in her avoidance of pregnancies: "Children are the curse of a woman, for when they come, they drive away Beauty, which is the best gift of the gods."

She was now more assertive in her defiance of her husband and mother-in-law than before, openly opposing them on the subject of the military education of Rudolf, who, like his mother, was extremely sensitive and not suited to life at court.

=== Hungarian coronation ===
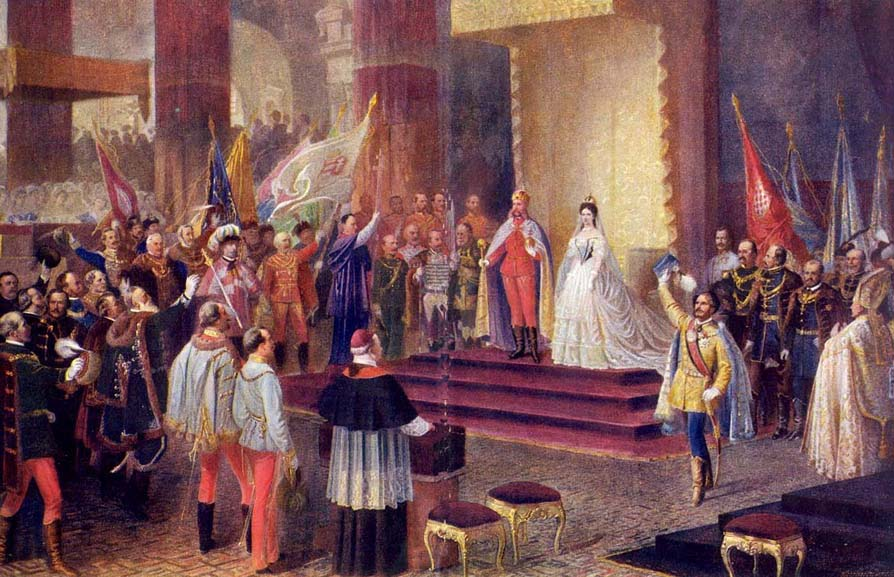
Coronation of Franz Joseph and Elisabeth as Apostolic King and Queen of Hungary

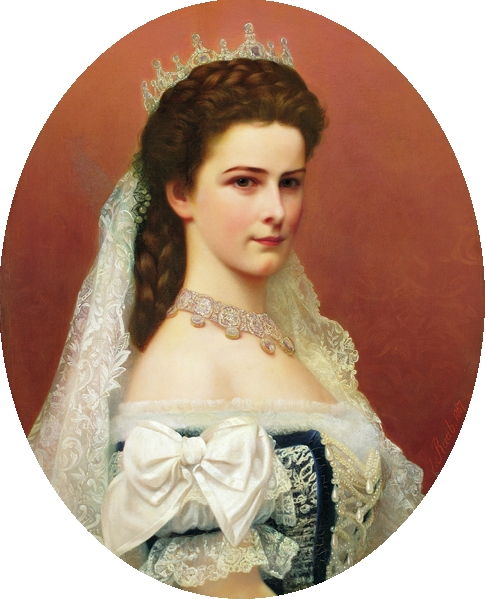
Empress Elisabeth in the Hungarian coronation dress and rose diadem (1867) by Georg Raab

After having used every excuse to avoid pregnancy, Elisabeth later decided that she wanted a fourth child. Her decision was at once a deliberate personal choice and a political negotiation: by returning to the marriage, she ensured that Hungary, with which she felt an intense emotional alliance, would gain an equal footing with Austria.

The Austro-Hungarian Compromise of 1867 created the dual monarchy of Austria-Hungary. Andrássy was made the first Hungarian prime minister and in return, he saw that Franz Joseph and Elisabeth were officially crowned King and Queen of Hungary in June.

As a coronation gift, Hungary presented the royal couple with a country residence in Gödöllő, 32 kilometres (20 mi) east of Budapest. In the next year, Elisabeth lived primarily there, leaving her neglected and resentful Austrian subjects to trade rumors that if the infant she was expecting were a son, she would name him Stephen, after the patron saint and first king of Hungary. The issue was avoided when she gave birth to a daughter, Marie Valerie Mathilde Amalie (1868–1924). Dubbed the "Hungarian child", she was born in Buda 10 months after her parents' coronation and baptised there in April. Determined to bring up this last child by herself, Elisabeth finally had her way. She poured all her repressed maternal feelings on her youngest daughter to the point of nearly smothering her. Sophie's influence over Elisabeth's children and the court faded, and she died in 1872.

=== Marriage ===
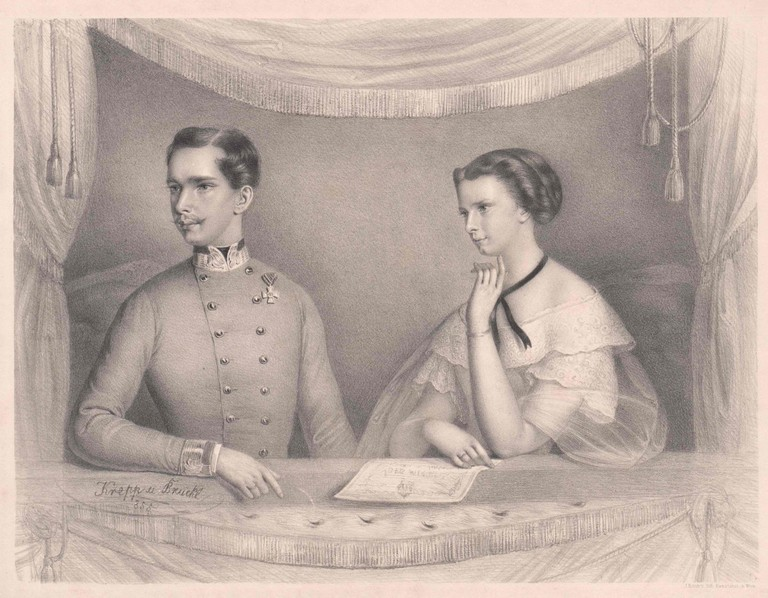
Empress Elisabeth and Emperor Franz Joseph I of Austria as a young couple c. 1855

Franz Joseph was passionately in love with his wife, but they had a very complex relationship. He was a stolid and sober man, a political conservative who was still guided by his mother and her adherence to the strict Spanish Court ceremony regarding both his public and domestic life, whereas Elisabeth inhabited a different world altogether. Franz Joseph indulged her wanderings, but constantly and unsuccessfully tried to tempt her into a more domestic life with him. Their correspondence increased during their last years, however, and their relationship became a warm friendship. The Empress slept very little and spent hours reading and writing at night, and even took up smoking, a shocking habit for women, which made her the further subject of already-avid gossip. She had a special interest in history, philosophy, and literature, and developed a profound reverence for the German lyric poet and radical political thinker Heinrich Heine, whose letters she collected.

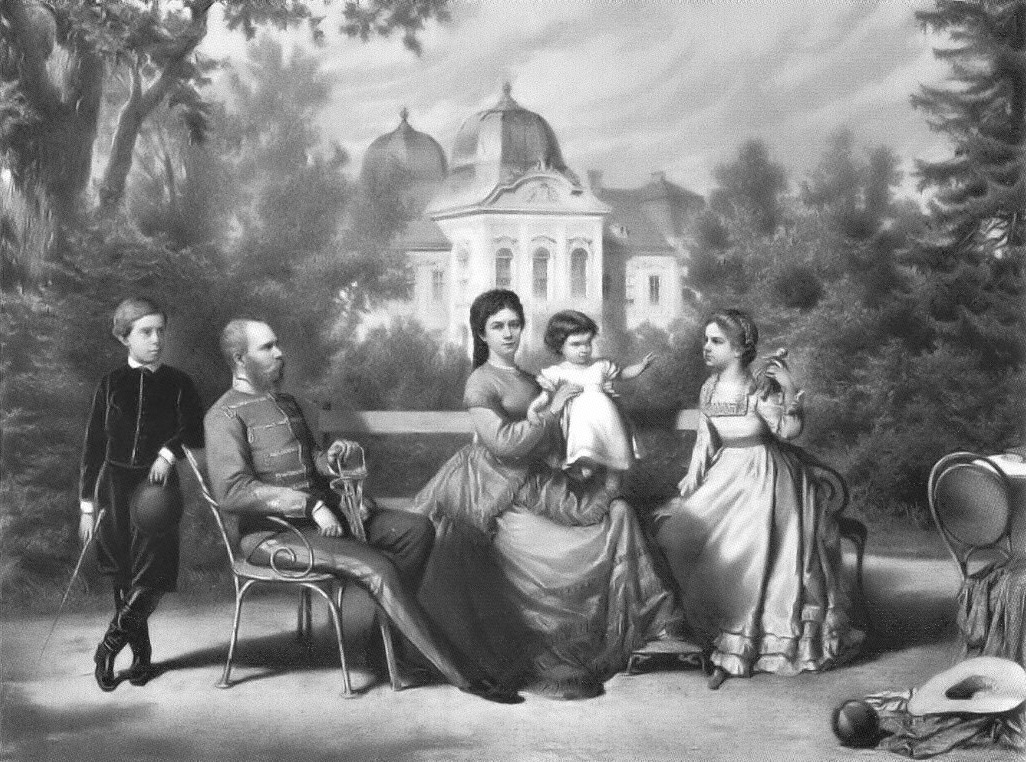
Engraving depicting the Hungarian royal family at Gödöllő Palace (c. 1870)

She tried to make a name for herself by writing Heine-inspired poetry. Referring to herself as Titania, William Shakespeare's Fairy Queen, Elisabeth expressed her intimate thoughts and desires in a large number of romantic poems, which served as a type of secret diary. Most of her poetry relates to her journeys, classical Greek and romantic themes, and ironic commentary on the Habsburg dynasty. Her wanderlust is defined by her own work:

O'er thee, like thine own sea birds
I'll circle without rest
For me earth holds no corner
To build a lasting nest.

Elisabeth was an emotionally complex woman, and perhaps due to the melancholy and eccentricity that was considered a given characteristic of her Wittelsbach lineage (the best-known member of the family being her favorite cousin, the eccentric Ludwig II of Bavaria), she was interested in the treatment of the mentally ill. In 1871, when the Emperor asked her what she would like as a gift for her Saint's Day, she listed a young tiger and a medallion, but: "...a fully equipped lunatic asylum would please me most".

=== Mayerling incident ===
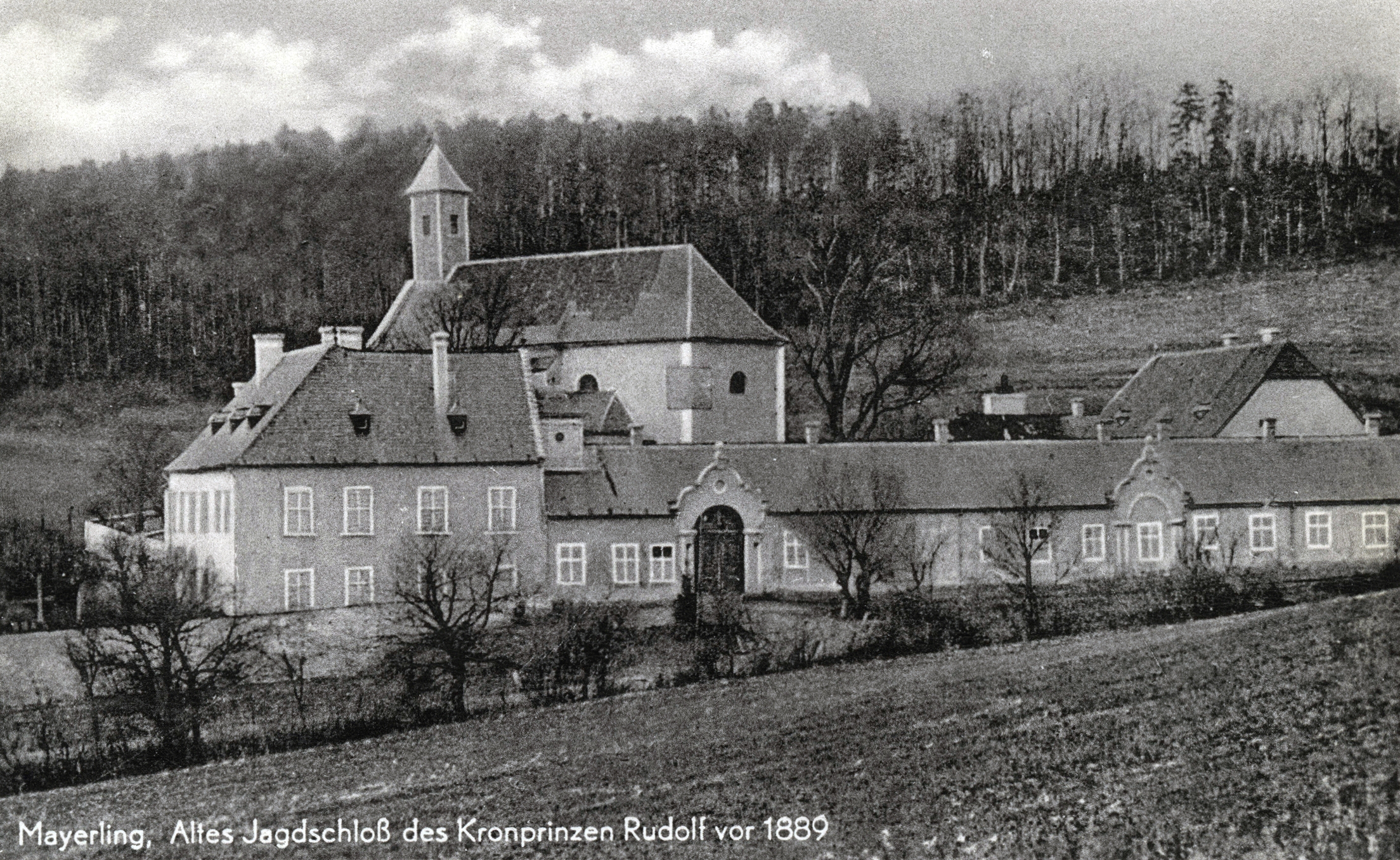
The imperial hunting lodge at Mayerling, in which Crown Prince Rudolf died by suicide in 1889

In 1889, Elisabeth's life was shattered by the death of her only son Rudolf, who was found dead together with his young lover Baroness Mary Vetsera, in what was suspected to be a murder–suicide on Rudolf's part. The scandal was known as the "Mayerling incident" after the location of Rudolf's hunting lodge in Lower Austria, where they were found.

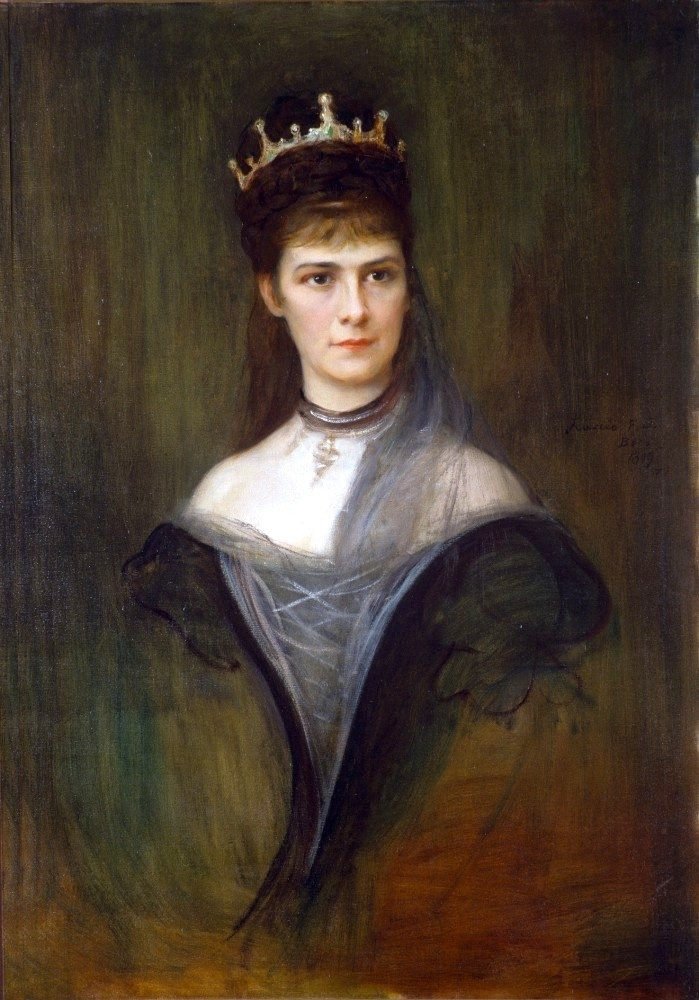
Elisabeth in mourning dress, by Philip de László (1889)

Elisabeth never recovered from the tragedy, sinking further into melancholy. Within ten years, she had lost her father, Maximilian Joseph, in 1888; her only son Rudolf in 1889; her older sister Helene in 1890; her mother, Ludovika, in 1892; and her younger sister, Sophie Charlotte, during an accidental fire at the Bazar de la Charité in 1897. After Rudolf's death she was thought to have dressed only in black for the rest of her life, although a light blue and cream dress discovered by The Hofburg's Sisi Museum dates to this time. To compound her losses, Count Gyula Andrássy died on 18 February 1890. "My last and only friend is dead," she lamented. Elisabeth's youngest daughter Marie Valerie declared, "...she clung to him with true and steadfast friendship as she did perhaps, to no other person."

The Mayerling incident increased public interest in Elisabeth, and she continued to be an icon and a sensation in her own right wherever she went. She carried a white parasol made of leather in addition to a concealing fan to hide her face from the curious.

=== Physical regimen ===
At 1.73 m (5 ft 8 in), Elisabeth was unusually tall for her time. Through fasting and exercise such as gymnastics and riding, she maintained her weight at approximately 50 kg (110 pounds) for most of her life. In deep mourning after her daughter Sophie's death, Elisabeth refused to eat for days – a behavior that would reappear in later periods of melancholy and depression. Whereas she previously had supper with the family, she now began to avoid this; and if she did eat with them, she ate quickly and very little. Whenever her weight threatened to exceed 50 kilos, a "fasting cure" or "hunger cure" would follow, which involved almost complete fasting. Meat itself often filled her with disgust, so she either had the juice of half-raw beefsteaks squeezed into a thin soup, or else adhered to a diet of milk and eggs.

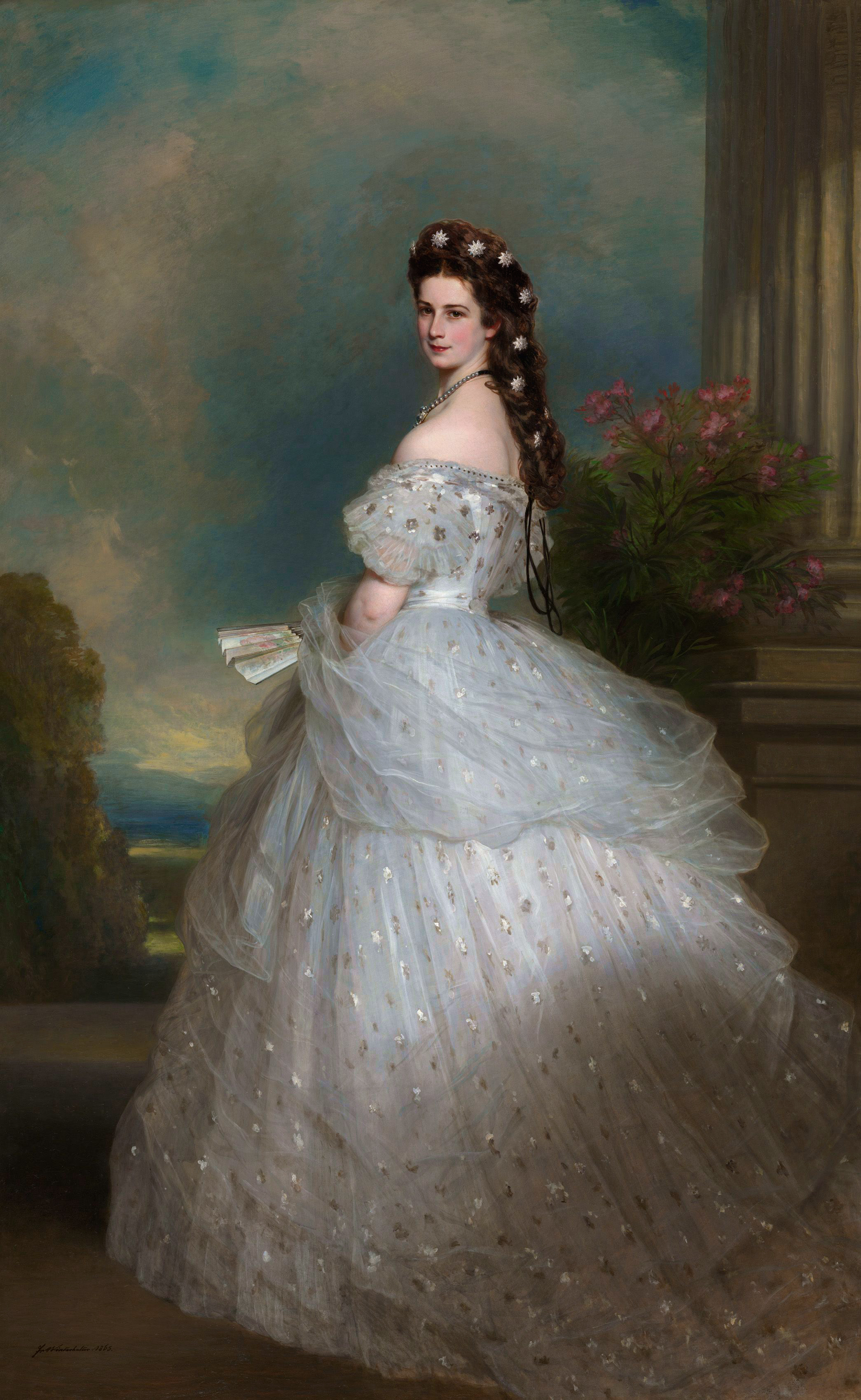
Empress Elisabeth of Austria in Courtly Gala Dress with Diamond Stars, by Franz Xaver Winterhalter (1865)

Elisabeth emphasised her extreme slenderness through the practice of tightlacing. During the peak period of 1859–60, which coincided with Franz-Joseph's political and military defeats in Italy, her sexual withdrawal from her husband after three pregnancies in rapid succession, and her losing battle with her mother-in-law for dominance in rearing her children, she reduced her waist to 40 cm (16 inches) in circumference.

Corsets of the time were split-busk types, fastening up the front with hooks and eyes, but Elisabeth had more rigid, solid-front ones made in Paris out of leather, "like those of Parisian courtesans", probably to hold up under the stress of such strenuous lacing, "a proceeding which sometimes took quite an hour". The fact that "she only wore them for a few weeks" may indicate that even leather proved inadequate for her needs.

Although on her return to Vienna in August 1862, a lady-in-waiting reported that "she eats properly, sleeps well, and does not tight-lace anymore", her clothing from this time until her death still measured only 47–49.5 cm (18 ½–19 ½ inches) around the waist, which prompted the Prince of Hesse to describe her as "almost inhumanly slender". She developed a horror of fat women and transmitted this attitude to her youngest daughter, who was terrified when, as a little girl, she first met Queen Victoria.

In her youth, Elisabeth followed the fashions of the age, which for many years were cage-crinolined hoop skirts, but when fashion began to change, she was at the forefront of abandoning the hoop skirt for a tighter and leaner silhouette. She disliked both expensive accoutrements and the protocol that dictated constant changes of clothing, preferring simple, monochromatic riding habit-like attire. She never wore petticoats or any other "underlinen", as they added bulk, and was often literally sewn into her clothes, to bypass waistbands, creases, and wrinkles and to further emphasize the wasp waist that became her hallmark.

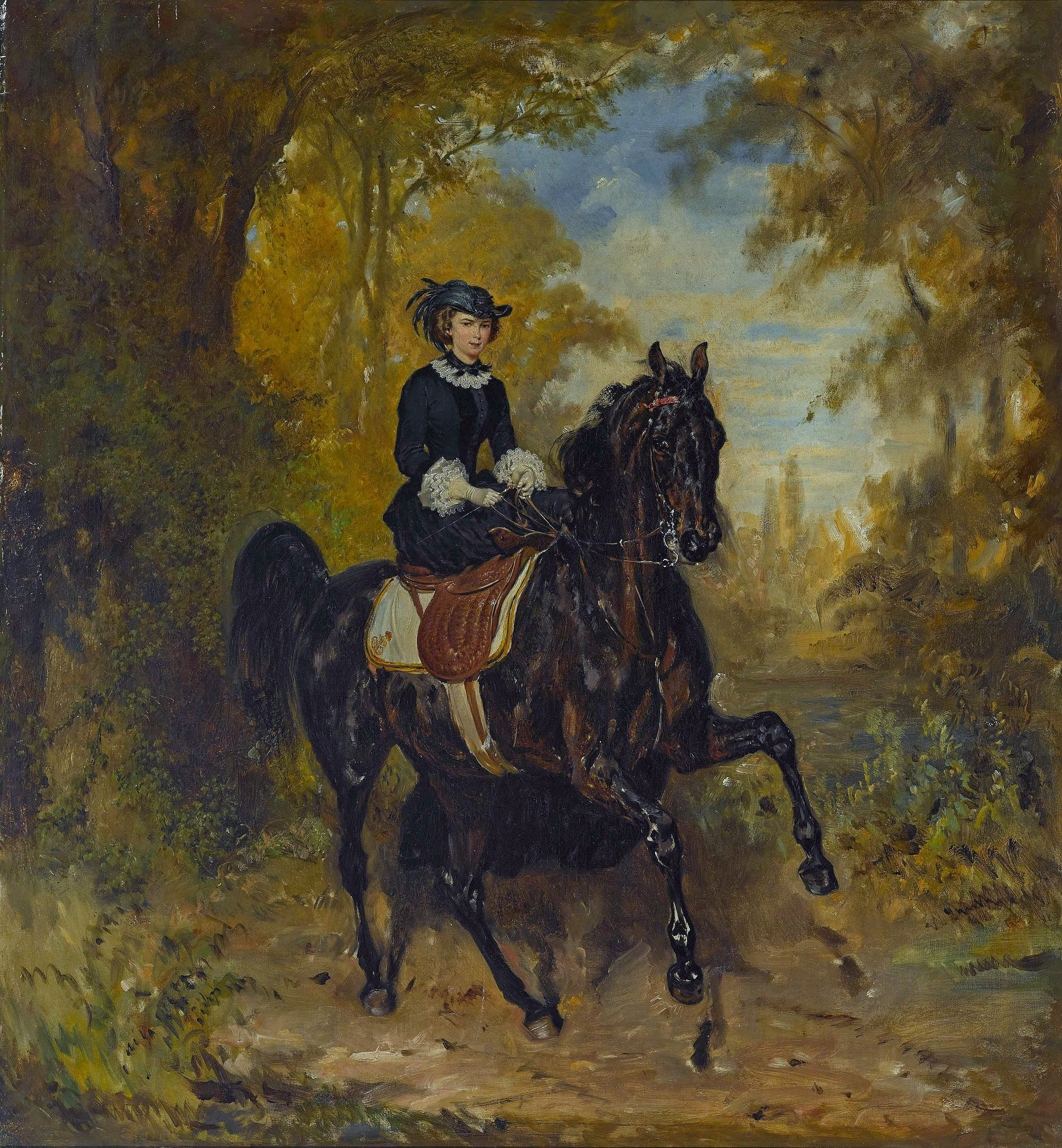
Empress Elisabeth on horseback, 1856

In the last years of her life, Elisabeth became even more restless and obsessive, weighing herself up to three times a day. She regularly took steam baths to prevent weight gain; by 1894, she had wasted away to near emaciation, reaching her lowest point of 43.5 kg (95.7 lbs). There were some aberrations in Elisabeth's diet that appear to be signs of binge eating. On one occasion in 1878, the Empress astonished her travelling companions when she unexpectedly visited a restaurant incognito, where she drank champagne, ate a broiled chicken and an Italian salad, and finished with a "considerable quantity of cake". She may have satisfied her urge to binge in secret on other occasions; in 1881, she purchased an English country house and had a spiral staircase built from her sitting room into the kitchen, so that she could reach it in private.

It has been suggested by historians that these habits indicate a restrictive eating disorder. Walter Vandereycken, a professor of psychology, has stated that: "numerous documents repeatedly describe her considerable fear of weight gain and the psychopathological changes specific for anorexia nervosa."

=== Beauty ===
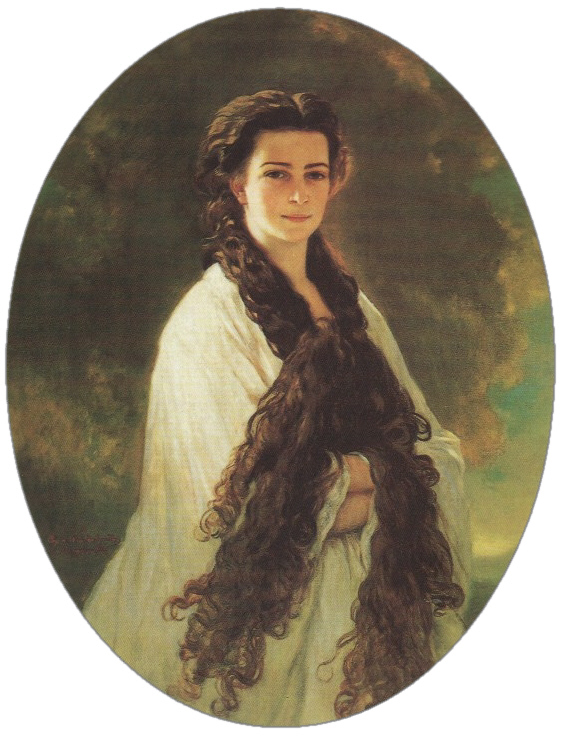
Portrait of Elisabeth depicting her long hair. Made by Franz Xaver Winterhalter in 1865, it was supposedly one of Emperor Franz Joseph's favourite paintings of his wife.

Elisabeth was widely regarded by contemporaries as one of the great beauties of 19th-century Europe. In addition to maintaining a rigorous exercise regimen, she followed extensive beauty routines. Daily care of her exceptionally long hair reportedly took several hours. Her hair, which darkened from blonde in her youth to chestnut brown in adulthood, was worn in elaborate braided styles. She is said to have complained that its weight caused headaches, and to relieve her scalp, she would use ribbons to tie her hair to the ceiling or wall hooks.

Her hairdresser, Franziska Feifalik, was originally a stage hairdresser at the Wiener Burgtheater. Responsible for all of Elisabeth's ornate hairstyles, she generally accompanied her on her travels. Feifalik was forbidden to wear rings and required to wear white gloves; after hours of dressing, braiding, and pinning up the Empress' tresses, the hairs that fell out had to be presented in a silver bowl to the reproachful Empress for inspection. When her hair was washed with a combination of eggs and cognac once every two weeks, all activities and obligations were cancelled for that day. Before her son's death, she tasked Feifalik with tweezing gray hairs away, but at the end of her life her hair was described as "abundant, though streaked with silver threads".

Elisabeth used these captive hours during grooming to learn languages; she spoke fluent English and French, and added modern Greek to her Hungarian studies. Her Greek tutor, Constantine Christomanos, described the ritual:

'Hairdressing takes almost two hours,' she said, 'and while my hair is busy, my mind stays idle. I am afraid that my mind escapes through the hair and onto the fingers of my hairdresser. Hence my headache afterwards.' The Empress sat at a table which was moved to the middle of the room and covered with a white cloth. She was shrouded in a white, laced peignoir, her hair, unfastened and reaching to the floor, enfolded her entire body.

Elisabeth used cosmetics and perfume sparingly, as she wished to showcase her natural beauty. On the other hand, to preserve her beauty, she tested countless beauty products prepared either in the court pharmacy or by a lady-in-waiting in her own apartments. She appeared to favor "Crème Céleste" (compounded from white wax, spermaceti, sweet almond oil, and rose water), but also used a wide variety of other facial tonics and waters.

Her night and bedtime rituals were just as demanding. Elisabeth slept without a pillow on a metal bedstead, because she believed it was better for retaining and maintaining her upright posture; either raw veal or crushed strawberries lined her nightly leather facial mask. She was also heavily massaged, and often slept with cloths soaked in either violet- or cider-vinegar above her hips to preserve her slim waist; her neck was wrapped with cloths soaked in Kummerfeld-toned washing water. To further preserve her skin tone, she took both a cold shower every morning (which in later years aggravated her arthritis) and an olive-oil bath in the evening.

Elisabeth had an aversion to being photographed, especially later in her life, and was quick with a fan or sunshade to prevent her portrait being taken.

=== Travels ===
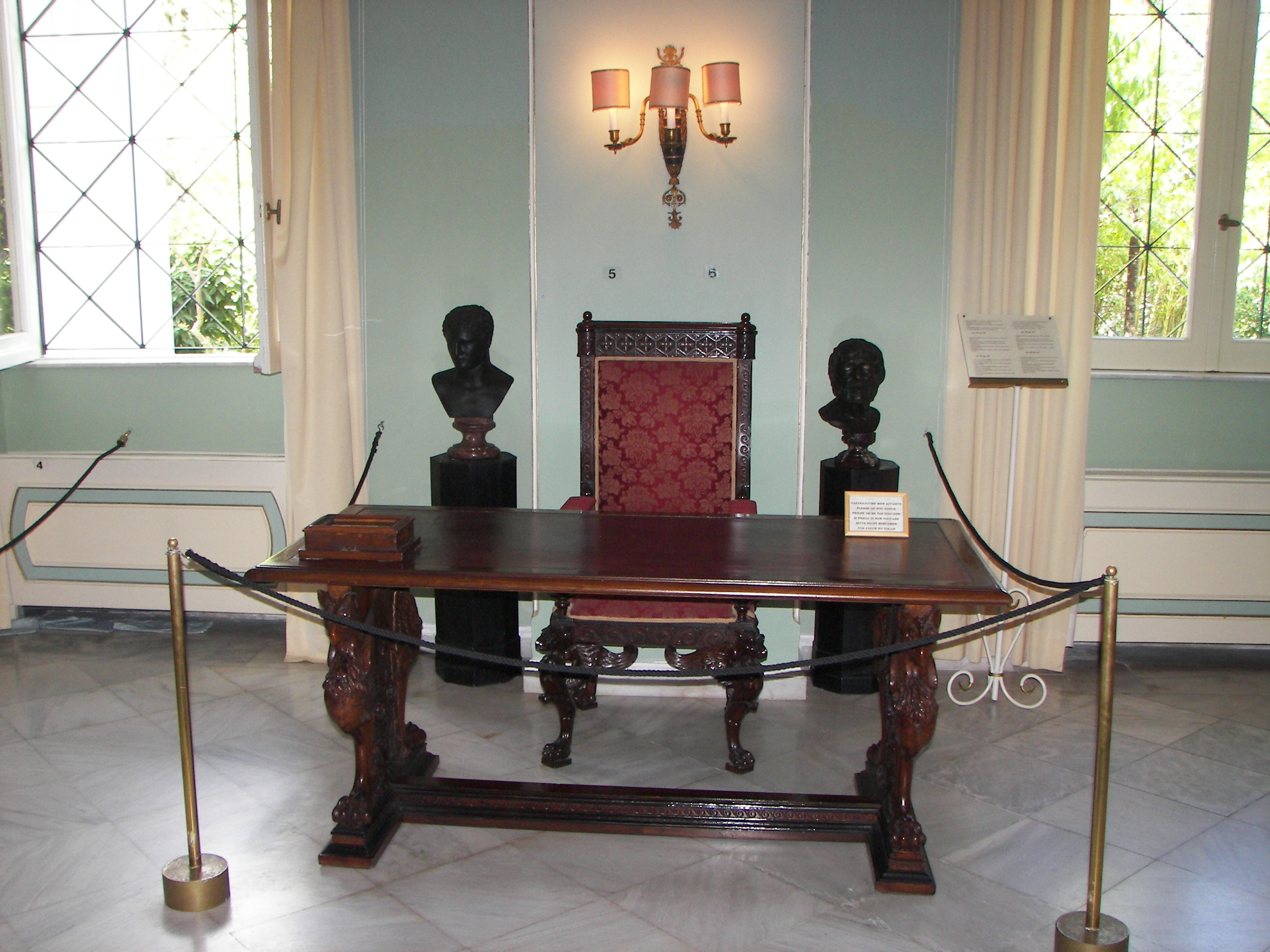
Elisabeth's desk at the Achilleion in Corfu

On her imperial steamer, Miramar, Empress Elisabeth travelled throughout the Mediterranean. Her favourite places were Cape Martin on the French Riviera, and also Sanremo on the Ligurian Riviera, where tourism had started only in the second half of the nineteenth century; Lake Geneva in Switzerland; Bad Ischl in Upper Austria, where the imperial couple would spend the summer; and Corfu.

In France she came in 1875 to Fecamp in Normandy accompanied by her daughter Marie Valerie and a court of 70 people. She was in Paris in 1882 March to see her youngest sister Duchess Sophie Charlotte in Bavaria. The history of the Pavillon des Drapiers and the City of Chantilly remember her trip to the Paris region. 1896-1897 she was in Roquebrune-Cap-Martin, at the Grand Hôtel du Cap-Martin. A small monument was erected on a « Sissi square ». The Empress also visited countries not usually visited by European royals at the time: Morocco, Algeria, Malta, Turkey, and Egypt. About her travels, she commented: "If I arrived at a place and knew that I could never leave it again, the whole stay would become hell despite being paradise".

In England, the Empress twice rented the Cheshire mansion Combermere Abbey from Viscount Combermere, in 1881 and 1882. A total of £10,000-worth of alterations were made for her stays, including installing hot water and an electric bell system; the costs were met by the Emperor. A keen huntswoman, the Empress's 80-strong retinue included 25 grooms, and she hunted frequently with the Cheshire Hunt while staying there.

After her son's death, she commissioned a palace on the Island of Corfu which she named "Achilleion" after Homer's hero Achilles in the Iliad. Emperor Franz Joseph was hoping that his wife would finally settle down at the Achilleion, but she soon lost interest in the fairytale property. The building was purchased by German Emperor Wilhelm II after her death. It was later acquired by the nation of Greece (now the Greek National Tourism Organization) and converted to a museum.

Newspapers published articles on her passion for riding sports, diet and exercise regimens, and fashion sense. She often shopped at the Budapest fashion house, Antal Alter (now Alter és Kiss), which had become very popular with the fashion-crazed crowd. Newspapers also reported on a series of reputed lovers. Although there is no verifiable evidence of her having an affair, one of her alleged lovers was George "Bay" Middleton, a dashing Anglo-Scot. He had been named as the probable lover of Lady Henrietta Blanche Hozier and father of Clementine Ogilvy Hozier (the wife of Winston Churchill). Elisabeth encouraged her husband Franz Joseph's close relationship with actress Katharina Schratt to assuage his loneliness during her long absences.

On her journeys, Elisabeth sought to avoid all public attention and crowds of people. She usually travelled incognito, using pseudonyms like "Countess of Hohenembs". She also refused to meet European monarchs when she did not feel like it. On her high-speed walking tours, which lasted several hours, she was mostly accompanied by her Greek language tutors or her ladies-in-waiting. Countess Irma Sztáray, her last lady-in-waiting, describes the reclusive and highly sensitive Empress as a natural, liberal, and modest character, a good listener, and a keen observer with great intellect.

While in Greece during her travels at the age of 51 (1888), Elisabeth got a tattoo of an anchor on her shoulder to reflect her love of the sea.

Almost all of the 10 companions who traveled with Elisabeth during her various journeys were in their mid-twenties and of Greek origin. The most famous one was Constantin Christomanos, a future playwright and theater director, whose memoirs of Elisabeth were banned by the Viennese court. The others were the lawyer Nikos Thermoyanis, Roussos Roussopoulos, who, thanks to Elisabeth, became an honorary consul in Budapest, Constantin Manos, who became a resistance fighter against the Turks in Crete, and Marinos Marinaky, a future sportsman and co-founder of the famous Greek football club Panathinaikos. The last tutor who accompanied the Empress was the English-Greek Frederic Barker. He also served as a middleman for negotiations to sell the Achilleion. After Elisabeth's death, Barker continued to stay in touch with the imperial family and became a freemason. On her voyages, Empress Elisabeth was also attended by a Swedish therapist, Arvid Ludvig Kellgren, to whom she even wrote romantic poetry.

== Assassination ==
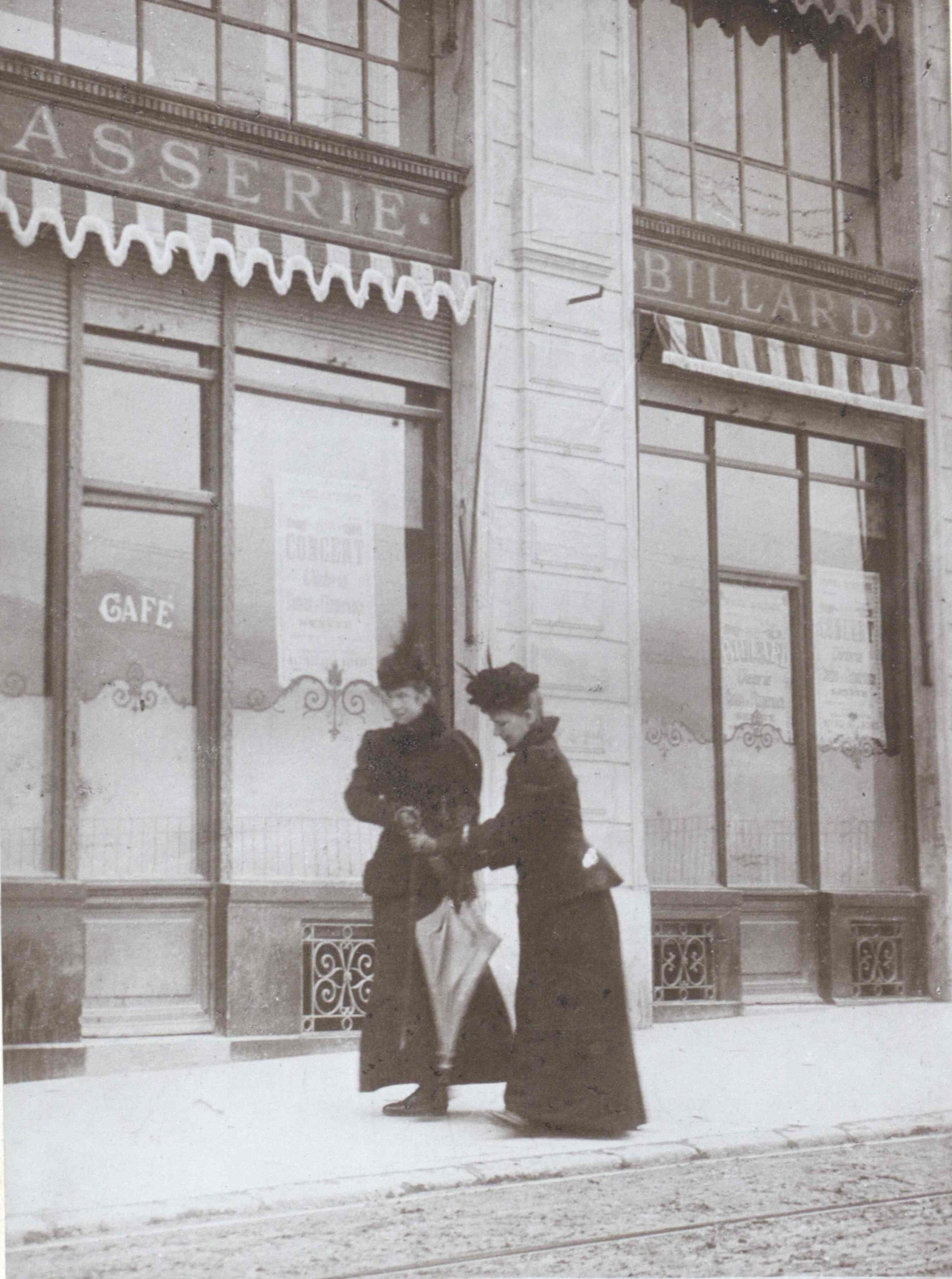
Purported last photograph taken of Elisabeth (left) at Territet, Switzerland, a week before her death

In 1898, despite warnings of possible assassination attempts, the 60-year-old Elisabeth traveled incognito to Geneva, Switzerland. However, someone from the Hôtel Beau-Rivage revealed that the Empress of Austria was their guest.

At 1:35 p.m. on Saturday 10 September 1898, Elisabeth and Countess Irma Sztáray, her lady-in-waiting, left the hotel on the shore of Lake Geneva on foot to catch the steamship Genève for Montreux. Since the Empress despised processions, she insisted that they walk without the other members of her entourage.

They were walking along the promenade when the 25-year-old Italian anarchist Luigi Lucheni approached them, attempting to peer underneath the empress's parasol. According to Sztáray, as the ship's bell announced the departure, Lucheni seemed to stumble and made a movement with his hand, as if he wanted to maintain his balance. In reality, in an act of "propaganda of the deed", he had stabbed Elisabeth with a sharpened needle file that was 4 inches (10 cm) long (used to file the eyes of industrial needles) that he had inserted into a wooden handle.

Lucheni originally planned to kill the Duke of Orléans, but the pretender to France's throne had left Geneva earlier for the Valais. Failing to find him, the assassin selected Elisabeth when a Geneva newspaper revealed that the elegant woman traveling under the pseudonym of "Countess of Hohenembs" was the Empress of Austria.

I am an anarchist by conviction... I came to Geneva to kill a sovereign, with object of giving an example to those who suffer and those who do nothing to improve their social position; it did not matter to me who the sovereign was whom I should kill... It was not a woman I struck, but an Empress; it was a crown that I had in view.

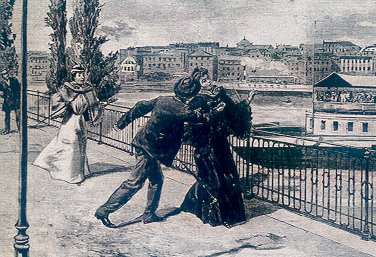
An artist's rendition of the stabbing of Elisabeth by the Italian anarchist Luigi Lucheni

After Lucheni struck her, Elisabeth collapsed. A coach driver helped her to her feet and alerted the Austrian concierge of the Beau-Rivage, a man named Planner, who had been watching the progress the Empress made toward the Genève. The two women walked roughly 100 yards (91 m) to the gangway and boarded, at which point, Sztáray relaxed her hold on Elisabeth's arm. The Empress then lost consciousness and collapsed next to her. Sztáray called for a doctor, but only a former nurse, a fellow passenger, was available. The boat's captain, Captain Roux, was ignorant of Elisabeth's identity, and since it was very hot on deck, he advised the Countess to disembark and take her companion back to her hotel. The boat was already sailing out of the harbor. Three men carried the Empress to the top deck and laid her on a bench. Sztáray opened her dress and cut Elisabeth's corset laces so she could breathe. Elisabeth revived somewhat and when Sztáray asked her if she was in pain, she replied, "No". She then asked, "What has happened?" and lost consciousness again.

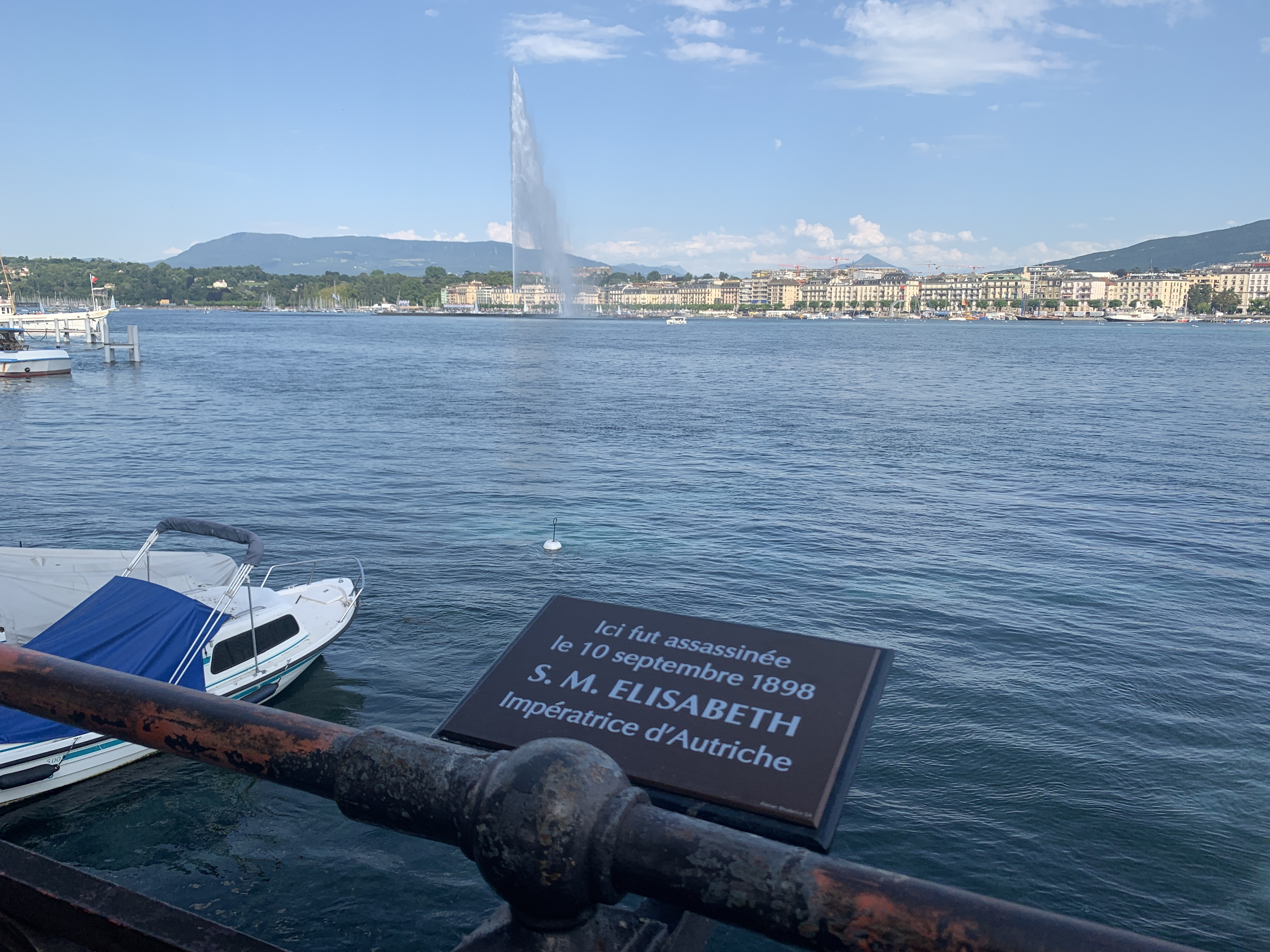
Sign reads "Here Empress Elisabeth of Austria was assassinated on 10 September 1898" in Geneva, Switzerland (2022)

Countess Sztáray noticed a small brown stain above the left breast of the Empress. Alarmed that Elisabeth had not recovered consciousness, she informed the captain of her identity, and the boat turned back to Geneva. Elisabeth was carried back to the Hôtel Beau-Rivage by six sailors on a stretcher improvised from a sail, cushions and two oars. Fanny Mayer, the wife of the hotel's director, a visiting nurse, and the Countess undressed Elisabeth and removed her shoes, at which point Sztáray noticed a few small drops of blood and a small wound. When they then removed her from the stretcher to the bed, she was clearly dead. Frau Mayer believed the two audible breaths she heard the Empress take as she was brought into the room were her last. Two doctors, Dr. Golay and Dr. Mayer arrived, along with a priest, who was too late to grant her absolution. Mayer incised the artery of her left arm to ascertain death and found no blood. She was pronounced dead at 2:10 p.m. Everyone knelt down and prayed for the repose of her soul, and Countess Sztáray closed Elisabeth's eyes and joined her hands.

Elisabeth had been the Empress of Austria for 44 years. She was survived by her husband, two children and nine grandchildren.

When Franz Joseph received the telegram informing him of Elisabeth's death, his first fear was that her death was caused by suicide. It was only when a later message arrived, detailing the assassination, that he was reassured on that point. The telegram asked permission to perform an autopsy, and the response was that whatever procedures were prescribed should be adhered to.

The autopsy was performed the next day by Golay, who discovered that the weapon, which had not yet been found, had penetrated 3.33 inches (85 mm) into Elisabeth's thorax, fractured the fourth rib, pierced the lung and pericardium, and penetrated the heart from the top before coming out the base of the left ventricle. Because of the sharpness and thinness of the file, the wound was very narrow and, due to pressure from Elisabeth's extremely tight corseting, the hemorrhage of blood into the pericardial sac around the heart was slowed to mere drops. Until this sac filled (a medical emergency known as cardiac tamponade), the beating of her heart was not impeded, which is why the Empress had been able to walk from the site of the assault and up the boat's boarding ramp. Had the weapon not been removed, she would have lived a while longer, as it would have acted like a plug to stop the bleeding.

Golay photographed the wound but turned the photograph over to the Swiss Procurator-General, who had it destroyed, on the orders of Franz Joseph, along with the autopsy instruments.

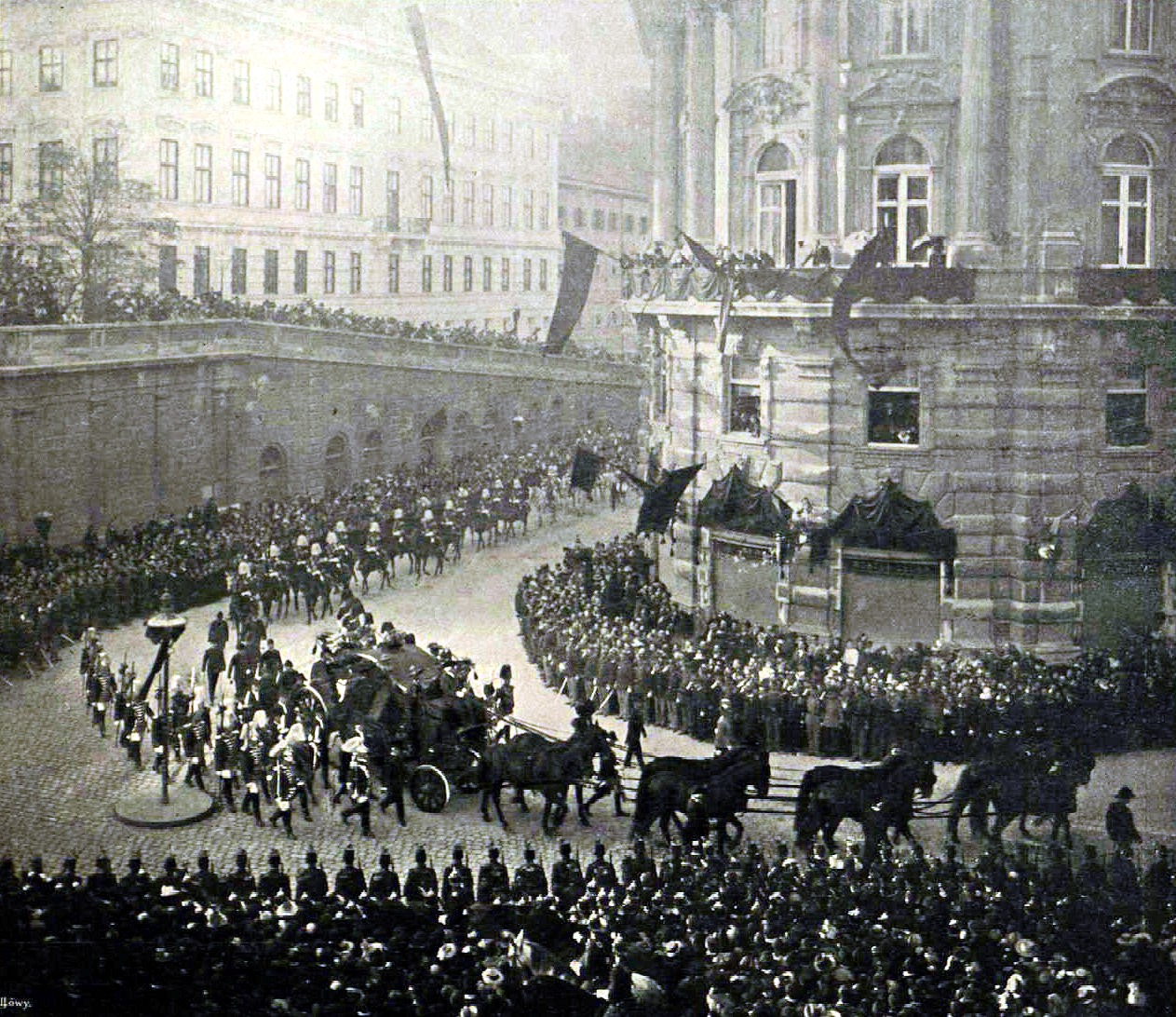
The funeral procession in Vienna (17 September 1898)

As Geneva shuttered itself in mourning, Elisabeth's body was placed in a triple coffin: two inner ones of lead, the third exterior one in bronze, reposing on lion claws. On Tuesday, before the coffins were sealed, Franz Joseph's official representatives arrived to identify the body. The coffin was fitted with two glass panels, covered with doors, which could be slid back to allow her face to be seen.

On Wednesday morning, the body was carried back to Vienna aboard a funeral train. The inscription on her coffin read, "Elisabeth, Empress of Austria". The Hungarians were outraged, and the words, "and Queen of Hungary" were hastily added. The entire empire was in deep mourning; eighty-two sovereigns and high-ranking nobles followed her funeral cortege on the morning of 17 September to the Imperial Crypt at the Capuchin Church.

=== Aftermath ===
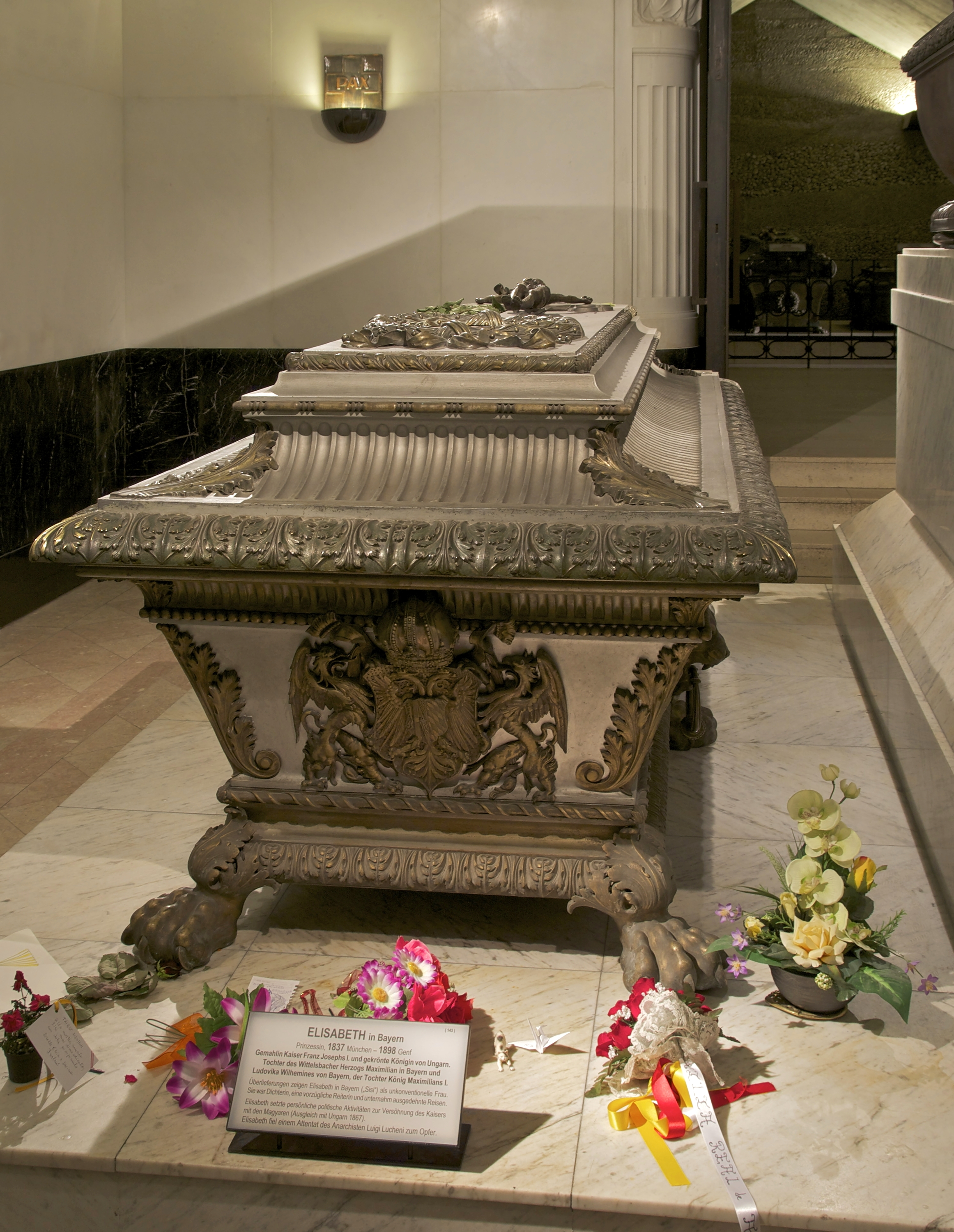
Empress Elisabeth's tomb next to that of her husband Franz Joseph in Vienna's Imperial Crypt. On the other side of his tomb is that of their son, Crown Prince Rudolf.

After the attack, Lucheni fled down the Rue des Alpes, where he threw the file into the entrance to No. 3. He was caught by two cabdrivers and a sailor, then secured by a gendarme. The weapon was found the next day by the concierge during his morning cleaning; he thought it belonged to a laborer, who had moved the day before, and did not notify the police of his discovery until the following day. There was no blood on the file, and the tip was broken off, which occurred when Lucheni threw it away. The file was so dull in appearance it was speculated that it had been deliberately selected because it would be less noticeable than a shiny knife, which would have given Lucheni away as he approached. Lucheni had planned to purchase a stiletto, but lacking the price of 12 francs, he had simply sharpened an old file into a homemade dagger and cut down a piece of firewood into a handle.

Although Lucheni boasted that he acted alone, because many political refugees found a haven in Switzerland, the possibility that he was part of a plot and that the life of the Emperor was also in danger was considered. Once it was discovered that an Italian was responsible for Elisabeth's murder, unrest swept Vienna and reprisals were threatened against Italians. The intensity of shock, mourning, and outrage far exceeded that which occurred at the news of Rudolf's death.

An outcry also immediately erupted over the lack of protection for the Empress. The Swiss police had been well aware of her presence, and telegrams to the appropriate authorities advising them to take all precautions had been dispatched. Police Chief Virieux of the Canton of Vaud had organized Elisabeth's protection, but she had detected his officers outside the hotel the day before the assassination and protested that the surveillance was disagreeable, so Virieux had no choice but to withdraw them. It is also possible that if Elisabeth had not dismissed her other attendants that day, an entourage larger than one lady-in-waiting could have discouraged Lucheni, who had been following the Empress for several days, awaiting an opportunity.

Lucheni was brought before the Geneva Court in October. Furious that the death sentence had been abolished there, he demanded that he be tried according to the laws of the Canton of Lucerne, which still had the death penalty, signing the letter: "Luigi Lucheni, anarchist, and one of the most dangerous". Since Elisabeth was famous for preferring the common man to courtiers, known for her charitable works, and considered such a blameless target, Lucheni's sanity was questioned initially. He was declared to be sane, but was tried as a common murderer, not a political criminal. Incarcerated for life, and denied the opportunity to make a political statement by his action, he attempted to kill himself with the sharpened key from a tin of sardines on 20 February 1900. Ten years later, he hanged himself with his belt in his cell on the evening of 16 October 1910, after a guard confiscated his uncompleted memoirs.

Franz Joseph remarked to Prince Liechtenstein, who was the couple's devoted equerry, "That a man could be found to attack such a woman, whose whole life was spent in doing good and who never injured any person, is to me incomprehensible."

Elisabeth's will stipulated that a large part of her jewel collection should be sold and the proceeds (then estimated at over £600,000), were to be applied to various religious and charitable organizations. Everything else that the Empress had the power to bequeath, outside of the crown jewels and state property, was left to her granddaughter, Archduchess Elisabeth, Rudolf's only child.

The assassination resulted in the International Conference of Rome for the Social Defense Against Anarchists, the first international conference against terrorism.

== Legacy ==
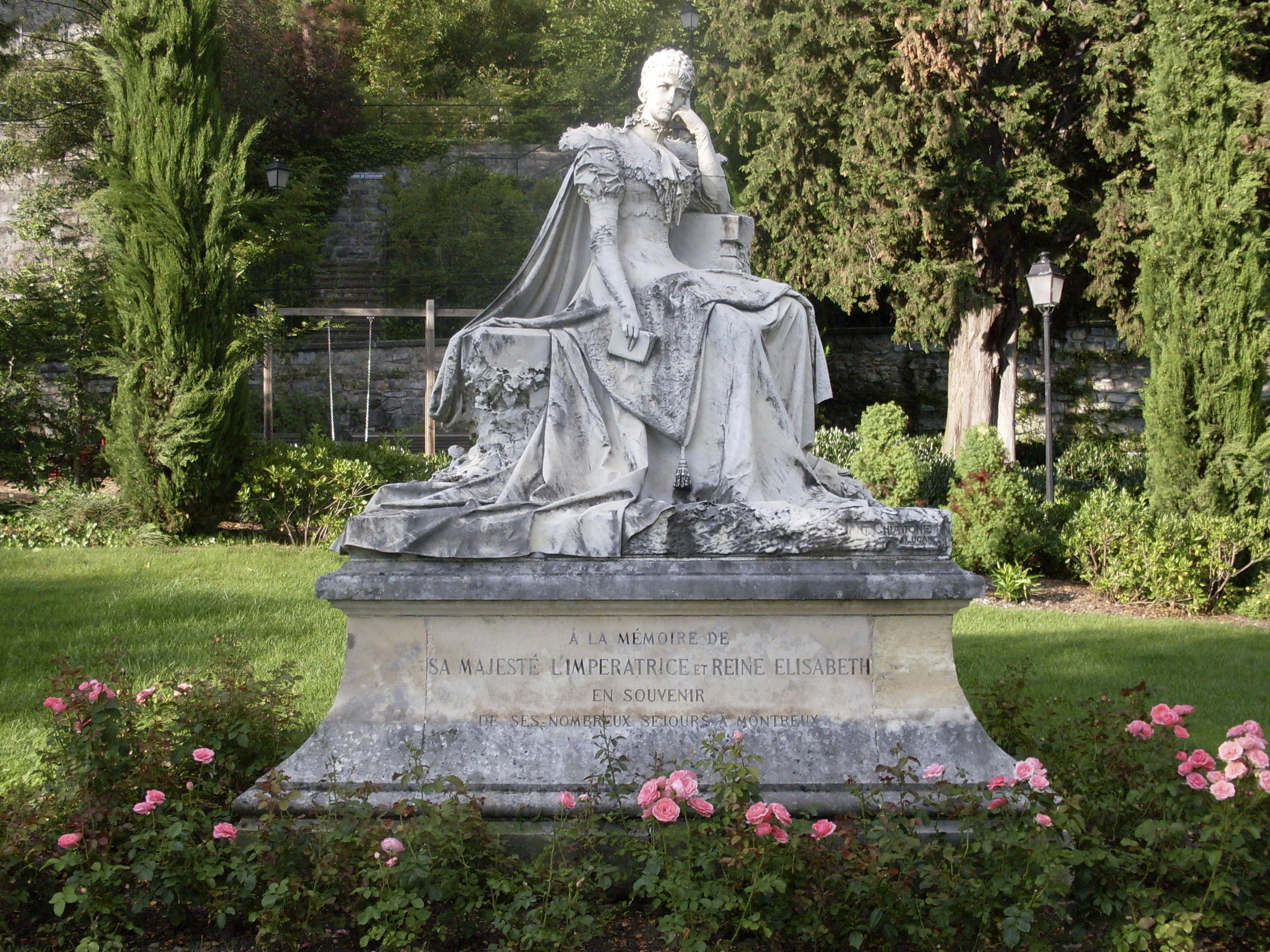
Memorial statue in Territet

Upon her death, Franz Joseph founded the Order of Elizabeth in memory of her.

On the promenade in Territet, Switzerland, there is a monument to the Empress created by Antonio Chiattone in 1902. This town is between Montreux and Château de Chillon; the inscription mentions her many visits to the area. In the Volksgarten of Vienna, there is an elaborate memorial monument featuring a seated statue of the Empress by Hans Bitterlich, dedicated on 4 June 1907.

There are several statues of Empress Elisabeth in Slovakia: a bronze statue by Gyula Donáth from 1903 at the Bardejov spa in Bardejov and busts in Poltár and in Prešov. Other statues in her memory were erected in Salzburg, in the garden of the former Hotel Strauch in Feldafing (where she used to stay on her later travels), in Budapest, in Funchal. Near the location of her assassination at Quai du Mont-Blanc on the shore of Lake Geneva, there is a statue in memoriam, created by Philip Jackson and dedicated in 1998 on the 100th anniversary of the assassination.

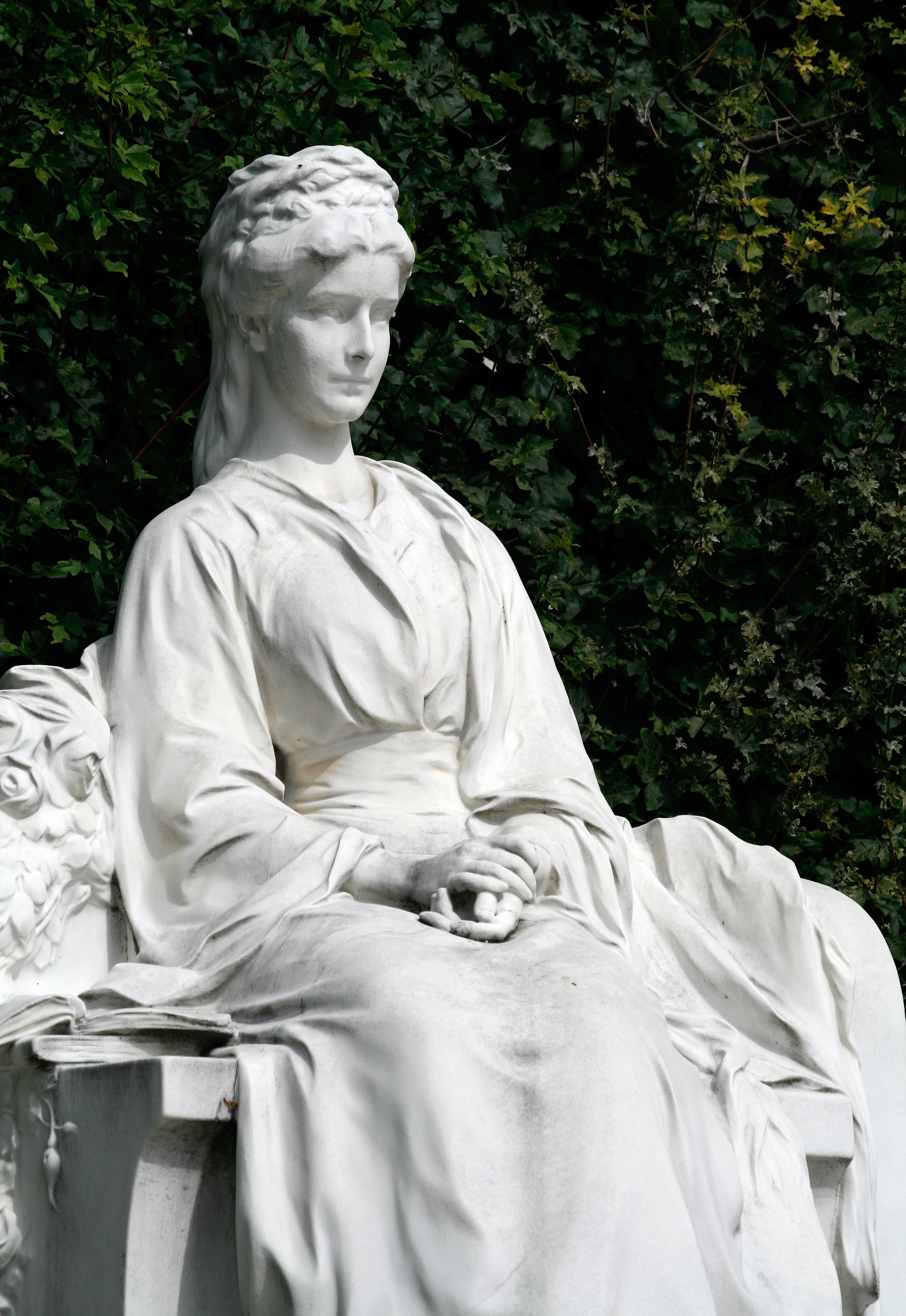
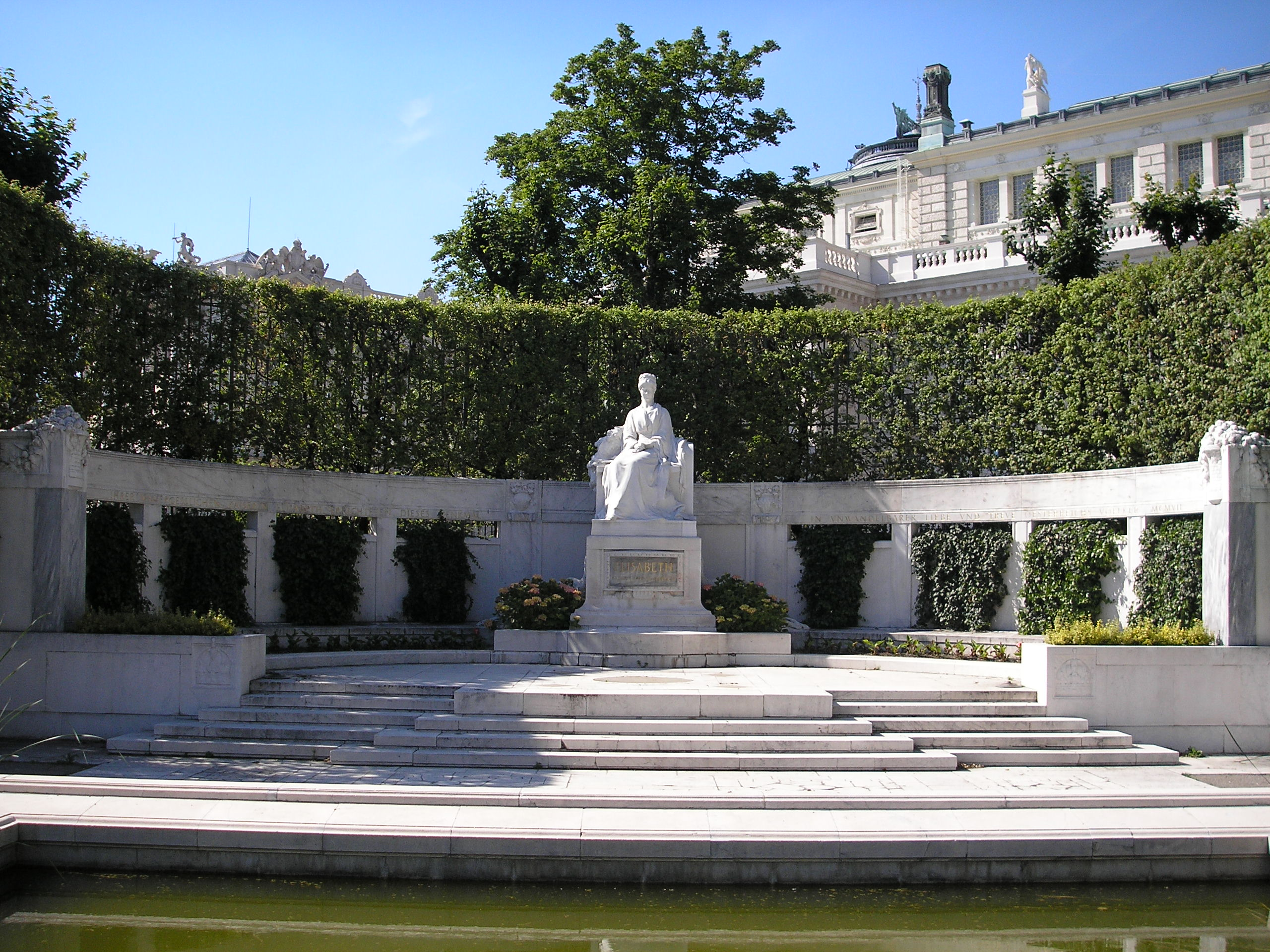
Monument to Empress Elisabeth in Vienna's Volksgarten

A large number of chapels were named in her honour, connecting her to Saint Elisabeth. The Elizabeth Church in Lviv, Ukraine (now the Greek Catholic Church of Sts. Olha and Elizabeth), was founded in 1903 by Emperor Franz Joseph in memory of Elisabeth. Various parks were named after her, such as the Empress Elisabeth Park in Merano, South Tyrol.

Various residences that Elisabeth frequented are preserved and open to the public, including her Hofburg apartment and the Schönbrunn Palace in Vienna, the Hermesvilla in the Vienna Woods, the Imperial Villa in Bad Ischl, the Achilleion on the Island of Corfu, and the Royal Palace of Gödöllő in Hungary. Her childhood family summer residence, Possenhofen Castle, houses the Empress Elizabeth Museum.

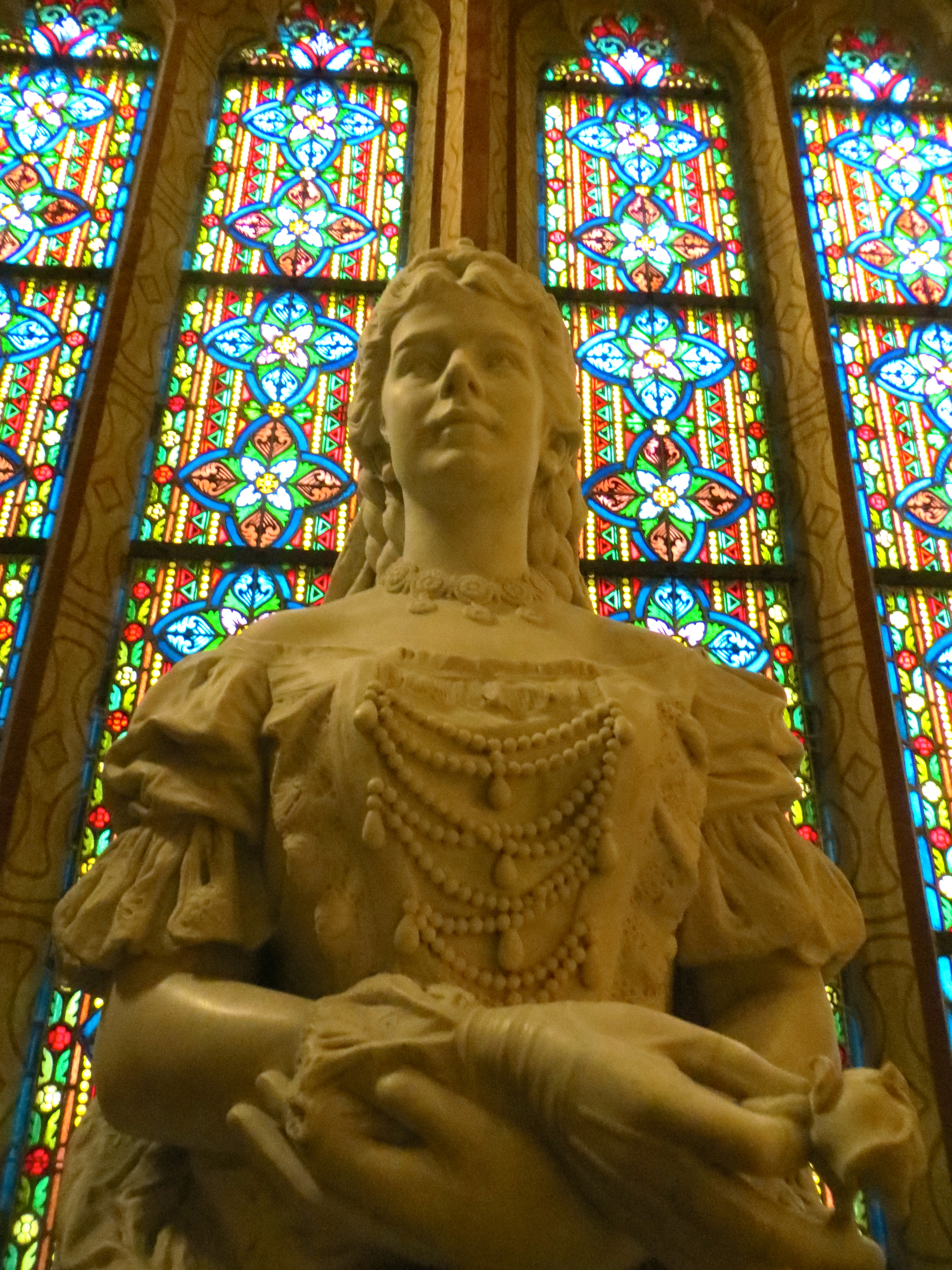
Queen Elisabeth of Hungary sculpture in Matthias Church, Budapest, Hungary

Several sites in Hungary are named after her, such as two of Budapest's districts, Erzsébetváros and Pesterzsébet. The Elisabeth Bridge over the Danube and connecting Buda with Pest, first constructed in 1903, was named after her. The Elisabeth Bridge connecting the towns Komárno in Slovakia and Komárom in Hungary (which used to be one town at the time when it was built in 1892), is named after the Empress. The Empress Elisabeth Bridge over the Elbe, opened in 1855, was named after her.

In the village Gastouri, on the Greek island of Corfu, a fountain is named after Elisabeth. The Empress had donated the "Fountain under the Sycamores" for the locals. It was festively inaugurated in 1894 by the church dignitaries and later named "Elisabeth Fountain".

The Empress's specially built railway sleeping car is on display at the Technical Museum in Vienna. Empress Elisabeth and the Empress Elisabeth Railway (Western Railway) named after her were recently selected as a main motif for a high value collector coin, the Empress Elisabeth Western Railway commemorative coin.

In 1998, Gerald Blanchard stole the Sisi Star, an A. E. Köchert jewel consisting of a 10-pointed diamond star surrounding a large central pearl, from an exhibition at Schönbrunn Palace in Vienna commemorating the centenary of her assassination. It was one of approximately 27 jewel-encrusted pieces designed and made by court jeweler Jakob Heinrich Köchert for her to wear in her hair, which appears in a portrait of her by Franz Xaver Winterhalter. The Star was recovered by Canadian police in 2007 and eventually returned to Austria. Although Blanchard possessed the priceless jewel, no one was ever formally charged with stealing it.

Two versions of the stars were created: a second type without a pearl center, was designed by court jeweller Rozet & Fischmeister; some stars were given to ladies of the court. One set of 27 diamond stars was kept in the Imperial family and it is seen in a photograph that shows the dowry of Rudolf's daughter, Archduchess Elisabeth, known as "Erzsi", on the occasion of her wedding to Prince Otto of Windisch-Graetz in 1902.

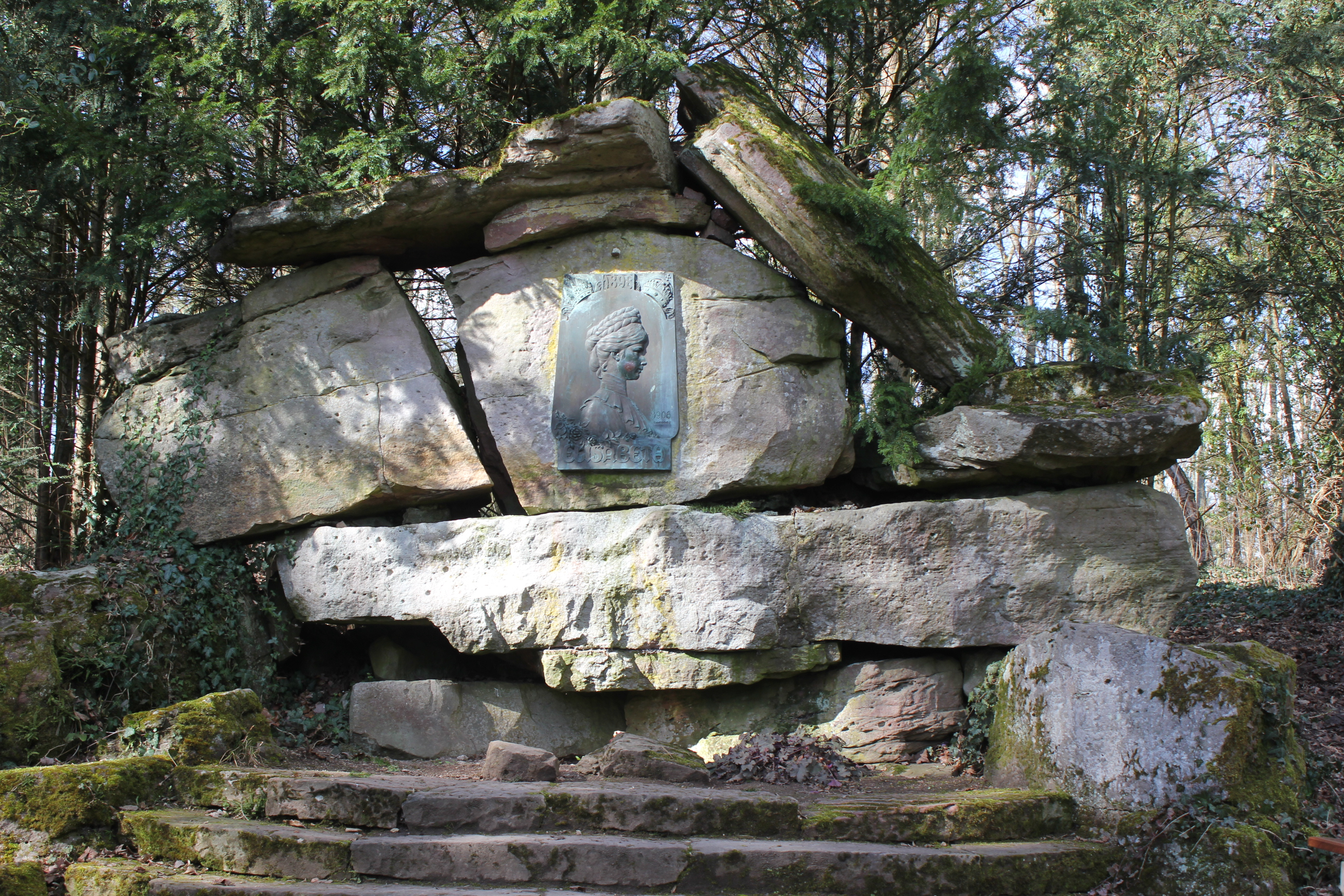
Sisi Monument at Bad Kissingen

== Portrayal of Elisabeth in the arts ==
=== Stage ===
- In 1932 the comic operetta Sissi premiered in Vienna. Composed by Fritz Kreisler, the libretto was written by Ernst and Hubert Marischka, with orchestrations by Robert Russell Bennett.
- In 1943 Jean Cocteau wrote a play about an imagined meeting between Elisabeth and her assassin, L'Aigle à deux têtes ("The Double-headed Eagle"). It was first staged in 1946.
- In 1992, the musical Elisabeth premièred at the Theater an der Wien in Vienna. With libretto by Michael Kunze and music by Sylvester Levay, this is probably the darkest portrayal of the Empress' life. It portrayed Elisabeth bringing a physical manifestation of death with her to the imperial court, thus destroying the Habsburg dynasty. The leading role in the premiere was originated by Dutch musical singer Pia Douwes. Elisabeth went on to become the most successful German-language musical of all time and has enjoyed numerous productions around the world, but has not been adapted for an English-speaking audience as of 2024.

=== Ballet ===
- In his 1978 ballet Mayerling, Kenneth MacMillan portrayed Elisabeth in a pas de deux with her son Prince Rudolf, the principal character in the ballet.
- In 1993 French ballerina Sylvie Guillem appeared in a piece entitled, Sissi, l'impératice anarchiste (Sissi, Anarchist Empress), choreographed by Maurice Béjart to Strauss's Emperor Waltz.

=== Film ===
- The 1921 film Kaiserin Elisabeth von Österreich was one of the first films to focus entirely on Elisabeth. It was co-written by Elisabeth's niece, Marie Larisch (who played her younger self at the age of 62), and starred Carla Nelsen as the title character. The film later achieved notoriety when a group of con-artists started selling stills from the murder scene as actual photographs of the crime.
- In 1928 German silent film The Fate of the House of Habsburg Elisabeth was portrayed by Erna Morena.
- Adolf Trotz directed the 1931 German film Elisabeth of Austria.
- In 1936, Columbia Pictures released The King Steps Out, a film version of the operetta Sissi, directed by Josef von Sternberg. It starred opera diva Grace Moore and Franchot Tone.
- Jean Cocteau directed the 1948 film version of his play The Eagle with Two Heads. Michelangelo Antonioni's 1981 film The Mystery of Oberwald is another adaptation of Cocteau's play.

In the German and Italian-speaking world, Elisabeth's name is often associated with a trilogy of romantic films about her life directed by Ernst Marischka which starred a teenage Romy Schneider and made her famous worldwide:

- Sissi (1955)
- Sissi – Die Junge Kaiserin (1956) (Sissi – The Young Empress)
- Sissi – Schicksalsjahre Einer Kaiserin (1957) (Sissi – Fateful Years of an Empress)
- Forever My Love is a condensed version, with the three films edited down into one feature and dubbed in English. This version was released in North America in 1962.

In early dramatizations, Elisabeth appears as peripheral to her husband and son, and so is always shown as a mature character. Schneider's characterization of Elisabeth as a young woman is the first time the "young" Empress is seen on screen. The trilogy was the first to explicitly depict the romantic myth of Sissi, and ends abruptly with her determination to live a private life. Any further exploration of the topic would have been at odds with the accepted image of the loving wife, devoted mother, and benevolent empress. The three films, newly restored, are shown every Christmas on Austrian, German, Dutch, and French television. In 2007, the films were released as The Sissi Collection with English subtitles. Schneider came to loathe the role, claiming, "Sissi sticks to me like porridge (haferbrei)." Later she appeared as a much more realistic and fascinating Elisabeth in Luchino Visconti's Ludwig, a 1972 film about Elisabeth's cousin, Ludwig II of Bavaria. A portrait of Schneider in this film was the only one, taken from her roles, which is displayed in her home.

- Ava Gardner played Empress Elisabeth in the 1968 film Mayerling, in which Omar Sharif starred as Crown Prince Rudolf.
- A 1991 French-German film called Sissi la valse des cœurs (a.k.a. Sisi und der Kaiserkuss) starred French actress Vanessa Wagner as Elisabeth, Nils Tavernier as Franz Joseph and Sonja Kirchberger as Helene.
- In 2007, German comedian and director Michael Herbig released an animated parody film based on Elisabeth under the title Lissi und der wilde Kaiser. It is based on his Sissi parody sketches featured in his television show Bullyparade. In Bullyparade – Der Film (2017), Elisabeth is played by Herbig himself.
- Sisi appears in 2012 biopic about Ludwig II of Bavaria titled Ludwig II, where she was played by Hannah Herzsprung.
- In 2014, to coincide with the presentation of the Pre-Fall 2015 "Metier d'arts" collection by luxury fashion house Chanel, shown in Leopoldskron Palace, creative director Karl Lagerfeld directed a short film featuring Cara Delevingne as Empress Elisabeth accompanied by Pharrell Williams. During a dream sequence, the duo sing a song written by Williams entitled CC the World, playing on the iconic interlocking logo of the fashion house, the initials of its founder Coco Chanel, as well as the Empress's nickname "Sisi". Lagerfeld recreated the iconic gown worn by Elisabeth in the portrait by Winterhalter, whilst Pharrell takes on attire similar to Franz Joseph.
- The 2022 film Corsage directed by Marie Kreutzer focuses on Empress Elisabeth's life following her 40th birthday celebrations. The film premiered at the 2022 Cannes Film Festival within the Un Certain Regard section and actress Vicky Krieps, who played the Empress, was awarded ex aequo the Best Performance Prize.
- The 2023 Austrian-German-Swiss film Sisi & I directed by Frauke Finsterwalder and starring Sandra Hüller, Susanne Wolff, Tom Rhys Harries and Angela Winkler, tells the story of Empress Elisabeth from the point of view of her lady-in-waiting, Irma Sztáray, with Wolff playing the role of Empress Elisabeth and Hüller in the role of Sztáray. The film was released in Germany on 16 March 2023.

=== Television ===
- Elisabeth was portrayed in episodes 1 and 4 of the 1974 British television series Fall of Eagles. Diane Keen played the young Elisabeth and Rachel Gurney portrayed the Empress at the time of Rudolf's death.
- The 1992 BBC adaptation of Agatha Christie's Miss Marple mystery The Mirror Crack'd from Side to Side centers around the shooting of a fictitious film about Elisabeth. The role of the actress portraying the Empress was played by Claire Bloom.
- The season five finale of the Austrian detective television series Kommissar Rex (1994) revolves around a deluded woman affected by the myth of the Empress. The episode, appropriately, is entitled, "Sisi."
- A heavily fictionalized version of Elisabeth's younger years is portrayed in a 1997 animated children's series, Princess Sissi.
- Arielle Dombasle portrayed Elisabeth in the 2004 French television film Sissi, l'impératrice rebelle, detailing the last five days of her life.
- Sandra Ceccarelli portrayed an older Elisabeth in the 2006 television dramatization of the Mayerling incident, The Crown Prince. Her son and his lover were played by Max von Thun and Vittoria Puccini.
- In 2009, Sisi, a two-part mini-series, premiered on European television, produced by a German, Austrian and Italian partnership, starring Cristiana Capotondi as Elisabeth and David Rott as Franz Joseph. Like the 1997 animated series and the films starring Romy Schneider, this film portrays the romantic mythology surrounding the unhappy marriage of Elisabeth and Franz Joseph, but focuses more on the political problems of the empire and the personal troubles of the main characters.
- In 2015 an Italian cartoon series Sissi, La Giovane Imperatrice began broadcasting on Mondo TV. In 2018 after airing two seasons totalling 56 episodes (26 minutes each, with 52 shorter 11–minute episodes slated for its 3D third season) it sold its second season to Jeem TV, after already having ported it to TV Azteca in 2017.
- In 2021 a German miniseries Sisi , aired on RTL+; Elisabeth was portrayed by Dominique Devenport. As of 2023, it is available in the United States on the streaming platform PBS Passport as Sisi: Austrian Empress.
- In the 2022 Netflix miniseries The Empress, centering on Sisi's life, she is played by Turkish-German actress Devrim Lingnau.

=== Literature ===
Constantin Christomanos (1867–1911), who served as Elisabeth's modern Greek language tutor from 1891 to 1893 and escorted her during her stay in Corfu, published his memoirs of her shortly after her death, in his 1899 Tagebuchblätter (Diary Pages). Although he portrayed Elisabeth in an idealistic favourable manner, as a fairytale princess come to life, his book greatly displeased the Imperial Court that declared him persona non grata and forced him to resign his university teaching position in Vienna and leave Austria. Mark Twain, who lived in Austria at the time of the Empress's death, wrote about her assassination in the article The Memorable Assassination, which he did not submit for publication.

Golden Fleece is a biography of Elisabeth by Bertita Harding (Bobbs-Merrill, 1937); one of five biographies by Harding about members of the Habsburg dynasty. In 1988, historian Brigitte Hamann revived interest in Elisabeth with her book, The Reluctant Empress: A Biography of Empress Elisabeth of Austria. Unlike previous portrayals of Elisabeth as a one-dimensional fairytale princess, Hamann portrayed her as a bitter, unhappy woman full of self-loathing and suffering from various emotional and mental disorders. She was seen to have searched for happiness, but died a broken woman who never found it. Hamann's portrayal explored new facets of the legend of Sisi, as well as contemplating the role of women in high-level politics and dynasties.

Drawing on Christomanos's diaries and so far unpublished sources from Greece's national archives, Austrian anthropologist and journalist Stefan Haderer published his book Under the Spell of a Myth: Empress Sisi in Greece, the English translation of the German original Im Schatten Homers: Kaiserin Elisabeth in Griechenland, in 2022. His book is both an accurate historical account of Elisabeth's travels to Greece and a very personal portrait of her character and her special relationship with the Greek people. In 2015, journalist Jennifer Bowers Bahney wrote the non-fiction narrative of the theft of the Koechert diamond and pearl jewel titled Stealing Sisi's Star: How a Master Thief Nearly Got Away with Austria's Most Famous Jewel.

The Empress haunts a deadly Christmas house party in the form of a chatty biography, Life of the Empress Elizabeth of Austria, in Georgette Heyer's 1941 mystery, Envious Casca. The book and its disappearance form part of the goings-on that drive the various family members and guests to distraction. Elisabeth's youth and early adult life are dramatized in the novel Imperial Waltz by William S. Abrahams (Dial Press, 1954). She features in Alexander Lernet-Holenia's 1960 novel Mayerling. The empress appears in the 1976 romantic fiction novel Stars in my Heart by Barbara Cartland.

Elisabeth appears as a significant character in Gary Jennings' 1987 novel Spangle. The novel concerns a circus traveling through Europe at the close of the 19th century, and portrays Elisabeth's interest in circuses and daredevil horseback riding. She appears in a cameo in the short story The Road to Charing Cross in the 1999 book Flashman and the Tiger by George MacDonald Fraser. She dances with the anti-hero, Harry Flashman at a ball at the end of the story, in which Flashman has helped prevent her husband the Emperor from being assassinated. Elisabeth's story inspired the 2003 children's book The Royal Diaries: Elisabeth, The Princess Bride set during her teenage years in 1853 and 1854.

Elisabeth and her purported lover, George "Bay" Middleton are included in the 2014 historical fiction novel, The Fortune Hunter by Daisy Goodwin. Author Allison Pataki wrote an historical novel about Elisabeth and her marriage to Emperor Franz Joseph entitled The Accidental Empress in 2015. Its sequel, Sisi, Empress on Her Own, was published in 2016. The story of Elisabeth is told in Susan Appleyard's 2016 ebook, In a Gilded Cage. A companion novel to the six-episode Netflix series The Empress, also titled The Empress, and written by Gigi Griffis, was published in 2022.

Elisabeth is also a significant character in the novel Empty Theatre by Jac Jemc, published in February 2023 by Macmillan. The novel is a fictional exploration of Elisabeth's relationship with her cousin, Ludwig II of Bavaria.

=== Music ===
Dutch singer Petra Berger's album Eternal Woman includes "If I Had a Wish", a song about Elisabeth. The song "SiSi" by the Scottish band Washington Irving is inspired by Elisabeth's life.

=== Other pop culture references ===
An indirect reference to Elisabeth is made in the 2004 film Phantom of the Opera. The heroine Christine (portrayed by Emmy Rossum) wears an elaborate white/silver ball gown in her first leading role, with diamond stars in her long, dark hair. The ensemble is modeled after Elisabeth's attire and hairstyle in the iconic Winterhalter portrait.

== Honours and arms ==
Styles of Elizabeth, Empress of Austria & Queen of Hungary
- Reference style: Her Imperial and Royal Apostolic Majesty
- Spoken style: Your Imperial and Royal Apostolic Majesty

- Russian Empire: Grand Cross of the Imperial Order of Saint Catherine, October 1853
- Spain: Dame of the Order of Queen Maria Luisa, 16 June 1854
- Mexican Empire: Grand Cross of the Imperial Order of Saint Charles, 10 April 1865
- United Kingdom: Dame Grand Cross of the Venerable Order of Saint John of Jerusalem, 23 May 1873
- Kingdom of Prussia: Dame of the Order of Louise, 1st Class
- Empire of Japan: Grand Cordon of the Order of the Precious Crown, 8 September 1898

Empress Elisabeth of Austria was formally nominated for the Grand Cordon of the Order of the Precious Crown, but never officially invested due to her death

Issue

Children	Birth	Death	Notes
Sophie Friederike Dorothea Maria Josepha	5 March 1855	29 May 1857	Died in childhood
Gisela Louise Marie	12 July 1856	27 July 1932	Married, 1873 her second cousin, Prince Leopold of Bavaria; had four children
Rudolf Franz Karl Joseph	21 August 1858	30 January 1889	Married, 1881, Princess Stéphanie of Belgium; had issue; Archduchess Elisabeth Marie of Austria; died in the Mayerling incident
Marie Valerie Mathilde Amalie	22 April 1868	6 September 1924	Married, 1890 her second cousin, Archduke Franz Salvator of Austria; had issue

== Ancestry ==
Ancestors of Empress Elisabeth of Austria

8. Duke Wilhelm in Bavaria
4. Duke Pius August in Bavaria
9. Countess Palatine Maria Anna of Zweibrücken-Birkenfeld
2. Duke Maximilian Joseph in Bavaria
10. Prince Louis of Arenberg
5. Princess Amélie Louise of Arenberg
11. Anne-Adélaïde Julie de Mailly-Nesle
1. Elisabeth in Bavaria
12. Frederick Michael, Count Palatine of Zweibrücken
6. Maximilian I Joseph of Bavaria
13. Countess Palatine Maria Franziska of Sulzbach
3. Princess Ludovika of Bavaria
14. Charles Louis, Hereditary Prince of Baden
7. Princess Caroline of Baden
15. Princess Amalie of Hesse-Darmstadt

== Notes ==
Empress Elisabeth of Austria House of Wittelsbach Born: 24 December 1837 Died: 10 September 1898
Austro-Hungarian royalty
Vacant Title last held by Maria Anna of Savoy	Empress consort of Austria; Queen consort of Bohemia; Queen consort of Galicia and Lodomeria; Queen consort of Hungary; Queen consort of Croatia, Slavonia and Dalmatia; 1854–1898	Vacant Title next held by Zita of Bourbon-Parma
Vacant Title last held by Maria Anna of Savoy	Queen consort of Lombardy-Venetia; 1854–1866	Kingdom abolished
