= A. E. Köchert =

Austrian jeweller (1814)

- Native name: A.E. Köchert Juweliere
- Industry: Jewellery
- Founded: 1814
- Headquarters: Neuer Markt 15, 1010 Wien, Austria
- Key people: Mag. Christoph Köchert
- Website: www.koechert.com

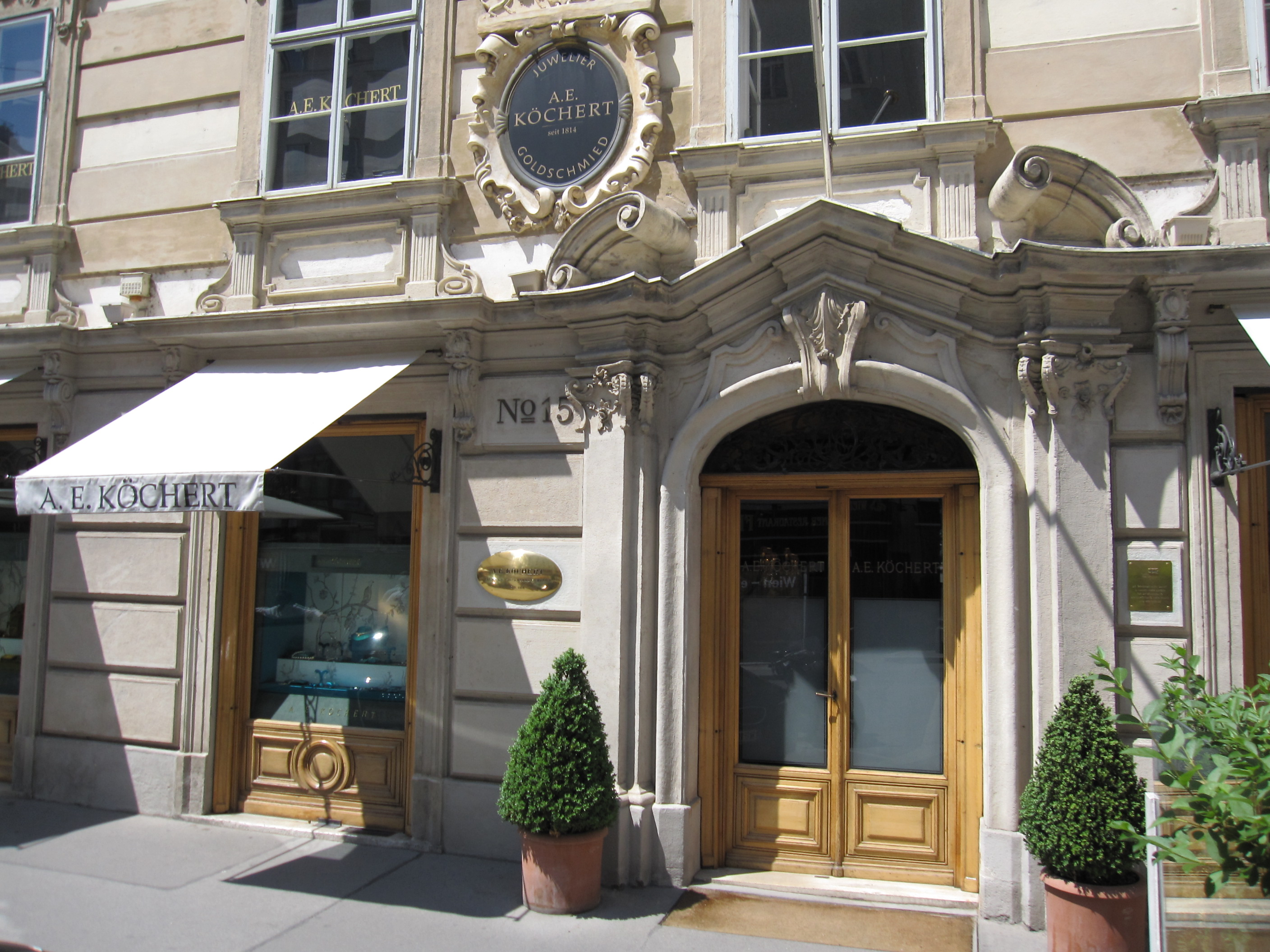
A. E. Köchert shop in Vienna

A. E. Köchert (sometimes spelled Koechert) is one of the oldest jewellers in Austria, founded by Jakob Heinrich Köchert in 1814. It is a family business known as the "Jeweler of the Emperors and Kings".

== History ==
The Frenchman Emmanuel Pioté (or Peyote) opened a goldsmith shop in Vienna in 1814, the same year the Congress of Vienna took place, giving a great visibility to the newly-founded shop. In 1819, Heinrich Köchert joined in as an associate (he was from a German family of carpenters), and married Pioté's sister-in-law. By 1827, Prince Metternich was the most prestigious client of the goldsmith shop Pioté and Köchert. When the emperor Francis II contracted Pioté and Köchert to create a golden box for the ambassador, the shop became the first official jeweler to the King («Kaiserlich-Königlicher Hofjuwelier»). The goldsmiths also made the 27-star hairpins for Empress Elisabeth of Austria (the «Sisi Sterne») that launched a new fashion in Europe. Alexander Emmanuel Köchert was tasked in 1844 with adding pearls to the Imperial Crown of Austria. The shop was located in the Palais Pallavicini before it moved to Hoher Markt 15 in 1873 in a shop designed by Theophil Hansen. Pioté retired in 1848 and Köchert became the sole owner.

The royal crown of the Empress Elisabeth made by Köchert was stolen in 1998 by Gerald Blanchard, and recovered 9 years later in Winnipeg, Canada.

In 2005 the company opened a new branch in Salzburg. In 2014, the Köchert family became a Henokiens association member after celebrating its 200th anniversary.

== Governance ==
A. E. Köchert is headed by Christoph and Florian Köchert. The founders of the dynasty have set up a rule that only two heirs could own the family business at any given time.
