= Gerald Blanchard =

Canadian jewel thief

- Born: Gerald Daniel Blanchard c. 1972; Winnipeg, Manitoba, Canada
- Occupations: Computer and security system expert
- Status: Released
- Convictions: 7 November 2007
- Criminal charges: Theft, Fraud
- Penalty: 8 years prison (paroled after two years)

Gerald Daniel Blanchard (born c. 1972) is a Canadian best known for orchestrating complex frauds and heists on three continents.

== Early life ==
Gerald Blanchard grew up in Canada, and later moved to Omaha, Nebraska with his mother Carol Phegly and sister.

== Sisi Star Heist ==
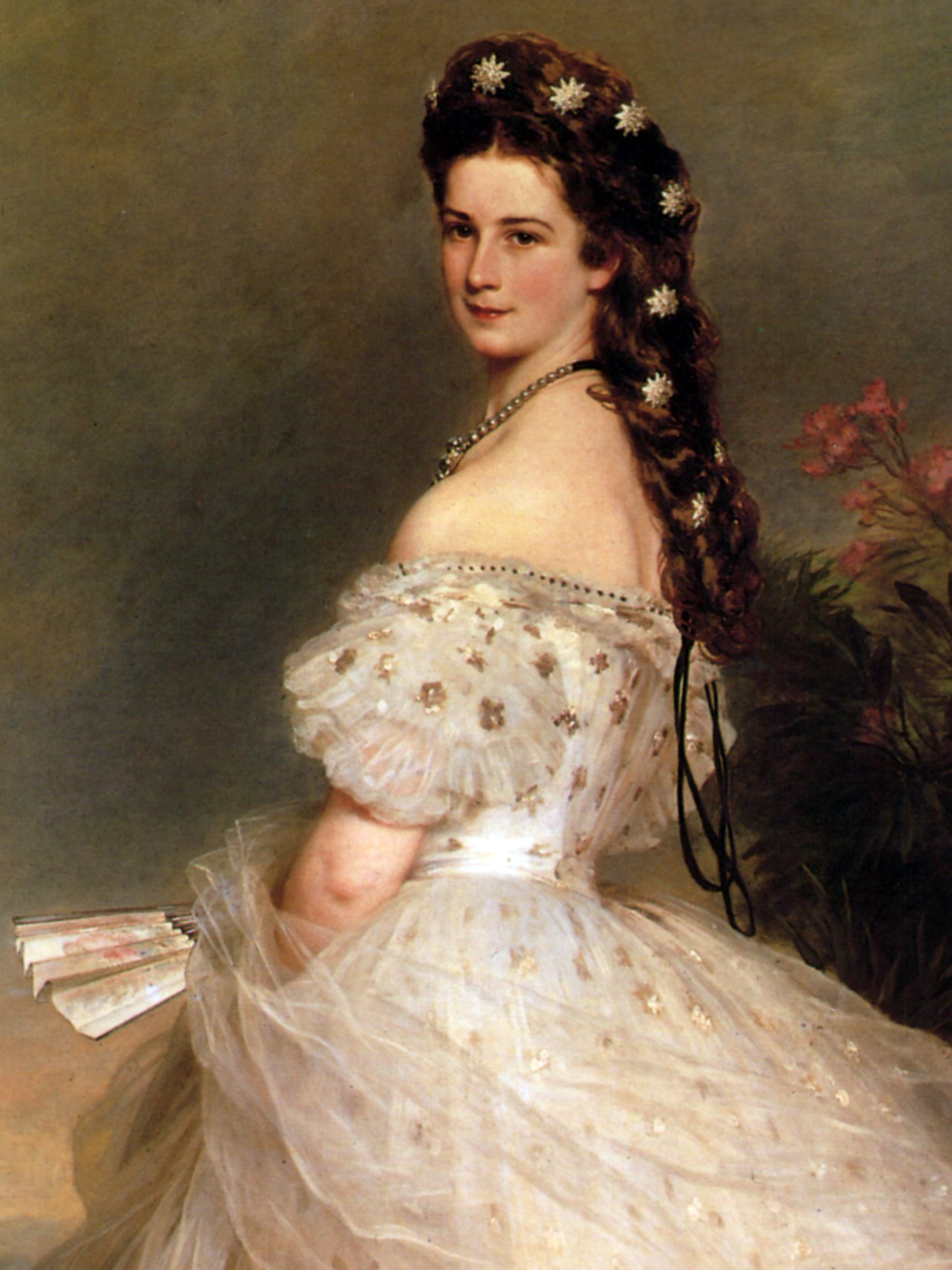
A portrait titled Empress Elisabeth of Austria in Courtly Gala Dress with Diamond Stars (by Franz Xaver Winterhalter)

In 1998, Blanchard stole the Star of Empress Sisi, one of 27 diamond-and-pearl hair ornaments worn by Elisabeth of Bavaria, consort of Francis Joseph I, from the Schönbrunn Palace in Vienna, Austria. Police thought that, accompanied by his wife and father-in-law posing as tourists, Blanchard disabled the alarm and replaced the jewel with a replica purchased at the souvenir shop. A parachute was found hidden near the palace grounds. Blanchard later said that he parachuted onto the palace roof from a small airplane in the middle of the night to make the swap. A few days earlier, Blanchard had toured the palace with his wife and father-in-law while video recording the layout. Police recovered a video tape on one of the many raids of Blanchard's high-end properties. The swap was not discovered until two weeks after the robbery. The loss of a priceless part of Austria's history remained unsolved until Blanchard offered to turn the jewel over to police following his arrest in Canada on fraud and robbery charges.

== Canadian Imperial Bank of Commerce ==
In 2004, Blanchard stole $750,000 from the ATMs of a soon-to-open Canadian Imperial Bank of Commerce, in Winnipeg, Canada.

He took police to his grandmother's basement in Winnipeg where he had hidden the Sisi Star. In return for the jewel, Blanchard's co-accuseds received conditional sentences. Blanchard never identified his accomplices in any of his global heists, and he was the only one to serve prison time. The priceless Köchert Diamond Pearl was returned to Austria by a Canadian Crown Attorney in 2009.

Blanchard pleaded guilty at the Court of Queen's Bench of Manitoba on 7 November 2007 to 16 charges of robbery and fraud in Canada and elsewhere in the world. He faced a maximum of 160 years in prison for the 16 charges, but was sentenced to just eight years by agreeing to make guilty pleas. Lawyer Danny Gunn from Campbell Gunn Inness law firm turned over the Köchert Diamond Pearl.

In June 2009, after serving two years of his sentence, Blanchard was first given day parole, and paroled to a halfway house.

== After prison ==
In January 2010, Blanchard was released and was reported to be developing a new career as a security consultant.

On 22 March 2010, Wired posted an article online from their April 2010 issue called "Art of the Steal: On the Trail of the World's Most Ingenious Thief" written by Joshuah Bearman. It follows Blanchard's life profiling many of his heists, and his capture, prosecution, and subsequent release.

On April 23, 2012, Blanchard was formally released from prison in British Columbia under conditions.

A book describing Blanchard's infamous theft, Stealing Sisi's Star: How a Master Thief Nearly Got Away with Austria's Most Famous Jewel by journalist Jennifer Bowers Bahney was released 21 May 2015. It details the life of Empress Elisabeth of Austria and the history of the Star.

In 2017, Blanchard, using the name Rick White, with an accomplice, was arrested for stealing PlayStations from a Best Buy in Ontario.

In 2023, Blanchard was the focus of the Hulu documentary The Jewel Thief. The documentary chronicled his entire criminal career and Blanchard was interviewed in addition to his mother, father, several friends and accomplices, and several law enforcement officers who investigated Blanchard.

== See also ==
- Frank Abagnale
