= Queen Elisabeth Music Chapel =

Coordinates: 50.7190°N 4.4158°E

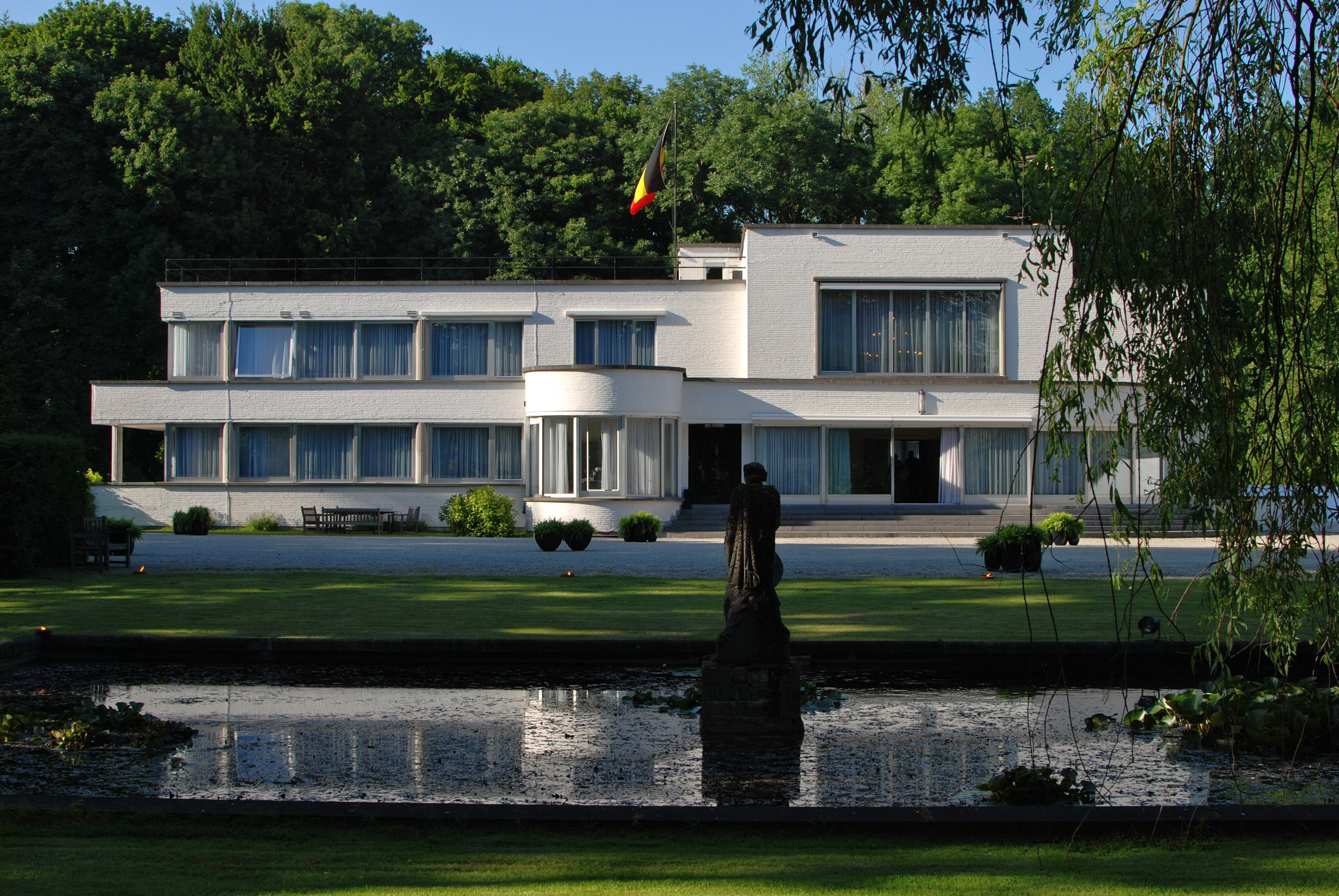
Queen Elisabeth Music Chapel

The Queen Elisabeth Music Chapel is a Belgian academic institution for artistic training of young musicians, which was created by Queen Elisabeth of Belgium and Eugène Ysaÿe. It is located in Waterloo, Belgium.

== History ==
Offshoot of ideas about musical training initiated by Eugène Ysaÿe 20 years earlier, the Music Chapel was inaugurated on 12 July 1939 by Queen Elisabeth. It is one of three musical institutions (the others being the Queen Elisabeth Competition and Antwerp Symphony Orchestra, the resident orchestra of the Queen Elisabeth Hall) dedicated to the former queen.

After the Second World War, the Music Chapel resumed its role as an educational institution as of 1956. Up to 2004, it welcomed a dozen young musicians and composers in residence, each supervised by a professor of their choice, for three-year cycles. A few generations of elite musicians were to stay in the college, occupying an eminent place on stage or in higher education. Legendary for its elite intake and output, the Music Chapel has consistently produced exceptionally world-class musicians and counts Plamena Mangova (piano), Yossif Ivanov (violin), Esther Yoo (violin), Lorenzo Gatto (violin), Vineta Sareika (Artemis Quartet), Hendrickje Van Kerckhove (soprano), Emmanuel Krivine (conductor), among its alumni.

== Functioning ==
In 2004, its purpose was completely transformed and is nowadays based on two aspects:

- High-level training in six disciplines (singing, violin, piano, cello, viola and chamber music) with the assistance of Masters in residence. There will be six names in classical music working with the chapel and its young musicians:
  - José Van Dam (singing)
  - Augustin Dumay (violin)
  - Maria João Pires (piano)
  - Gary Hoffman (cello)
  - Miguel da Silva (viola)
  - Artemis Quartet (chamber music)
- Professional involvement by means of a network of cultural partners in Belgium (Bozar, Flagey, Monnaie, major orchestras, etc.) and partners from all over the world (France, the Netherlands, Switzerland, Spain, Austria, Japan and the EU). 200 concerts were produced, coproduced or initiated by the chapel. The Music Chapel collaborates with some of the orchestras across the world including the National Orchestra of Belgium, the Royal Concertgebouw Orchestra, London Chamber Orchestra, Kansai Philharmonic Orchestra and the Sinfonia Varsovia, amongst others. It has thus become an actor in

musical life and a flagship institution through its connections with orchestras, festivals and broadcasters, locally and abroad.

Every year, the Chapel takes more than 50 talented young people in residence, Belgian and foreign.

The chapel's budget is currently €4 million per annum. 85% of it is financed by the private sector (foundations, companies, private sponsorship, own receipts) and 15% by public subsidies (Federal scientific policy, Ministry of Education, Wallonia Brussels Federation, etc.). The Music Chapel is supported by many cultural patrons and sponsors: Belgacom, ING and Ginion Group are its main sponsors.

== Architecture ==
Built to Yvan Renchon's plans, the Music Chapel was inaugurated on 11 July 1939. The Queen Elisabeth Music Chapel building is a specimen of architecture in transition between Art Deco and modernism. The public authorities listed the original building and its park in 1994.

After renovation of the interior in 2004 and the structures of the Chapel in 2008-2009 (a public utility foundation which manages the operational side and a public limited company with a social objective which owns the property in Waterloo), the Music Chapel is currently drawing up a large-scale infrastructure development project. This New Building project is based on:

- Expanding residential accommodation for performers, which has been the project's aim since 1939.
- Expanding the teaching areas.
- Creating a new broadcasting and recording studio able to accommodate up to 200 performers.

The aim of this project is to double the chapel's reception capacity. (1 800 m2->3 600 m2). The initial budgetary estimate for this project is approx. €5 to 6 million excluding tax. The Launoit Wing opened in 2024.
