= Ballet of the 20th Century =

Defunct Belgian ballet company

Ballet du XXe Siècle

General information
- Name: Ballet du XXe Siècle
- Year founded: 1960
- Closed: 1987
- Founder: Maurice Béjart
- Location: Brussels, Belgium
- Principal venue: Théâtre Royal de la Monnaie

Artistic staff
- Artistic director: Maurice Béjart

Ballet of the 20th Century (French: Ballet du XXme Siècle), was a ballet and contemporary dance company in Brussels, Belgium in 1960, by the French/Swiss choreographer Maurice Béjart. For many years it was the official dance company of the Théâtre Royal de la Monnaie.

The company was known for including South and East Asian elements in its performances.

== History ==
Bejart had previously founded a company in Paris, which he named first Les Ballets de l'Étoile, and later Ballet Théâtre de Maurice Bejart. When he moved to Brussels in 1960, he relocated the company and renamed it Ballet du XXme Siècle. It was eventually dissolved when Bejart moved to Switzerland to form Béjart Ballet in Lausanne in 1987.

== Main performers ==
Women

- Angèle Albrecht
- Hitomi Asakawa
- Tania Bari
- Sophie Baule
- Tessa Beaumont
- Claire Carrie
- Louba Dobrievich
- Suzanne Farrell
- Maina Gielgud
- Graziella Gillebertus
- Nicole Karys
- Jaleh Kerendi
- Brigitte Kher
- Dolorès Laga
- Beatriz Margenat
- Maguy Marin
- Andrée Marlière
- Menia Martinez
- Shonach Mirk
- Cécilia Mones
- Lise Pinet
- Rita Poelvoorde
- Laura Proença
- Michèle Rimbold
- Michèle Seigneuret
- Duška Sifnios
- Mathé Souverbie
- Christine Teyssier
- Carole Trévoux
- Catherine Verneuil

Men

- Rouben Bach
- Alain Baran
- Patrick Belda
- Vittorio Biagi
- Paolo Bortoluzzi
- Serge Campardon
- Antonio Cano
- Germinal Casado
- Pierre Dobrievich
- Jorge Donn
- Niklas Ek
- Michel Gascard
- André Herbet
- Daniel Lambo
- Jörg Lanner
- André Leclair
- Jorge Lefebre
- Yann Le Gac
- Pilippe Lizon
- Daniel Lommel
- Iván Markó
- Claude Mazodier
- Jan Nuyts
- Timur Ratlas
- Gil Roman
- Franco Romano
- Patrick Sarrazin
- Jacques Sausin
- Rachid Tika
- Patrice Touron
- Victor Ullate
- Micha van Hoecke
- Jean Vinclair
- Éric Vu-An
- Gerard Wilk
