= Riponne–Maurice Béjart station =

Lausanne Metro station

Riponne–Maurice Béjart
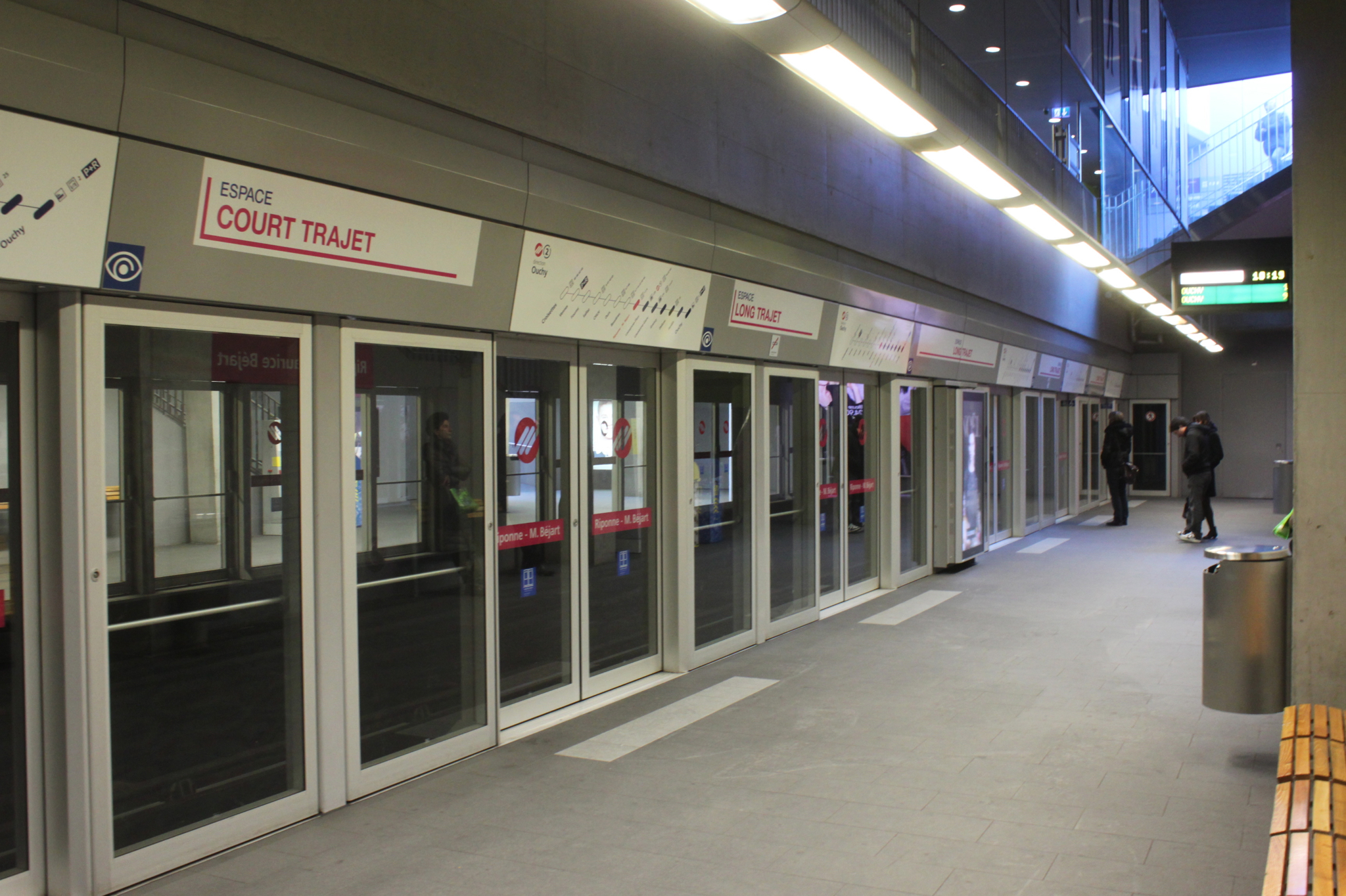

General information
- Location: Switzerland
- Coordinates: 46°31′22.4″N 6°37′57.4″E
- System: Lausanne Metro station
- Line: Line M2

History
- Opened: 27 October 2008

Services
Preceding station	Lausanne Metro	Following station
Lausanne-Flon towards Ouchy-Olympique	M2	Bessières towards Croisettes
Location

Riponne–Maurice Béjart is a Lausanne Metro station on Line M2. It was opened on 27 October 2008 as part of the inaugural section of the line, from Croisettes to Ouchy–Olympique. The station is located between Bessières and Lausanne-Flon. The station is named after the choreographer Maurice Béjart, who worked in Lausanne.
