= Germaine Acogny =

Senegalese dancer and choreographer

- Born: 1944 (age 81–82); Allahé, Benin
- Occupations: Dancer and choreographer
- Years active: 1960s to present
- Spouse: Helmut Vogt
- Career
- Current group: Jant-Bi
- Dances: African Dance

Germaine Acogny (born 1944) is a Senegalese dancer and choreographer. She is responsible for developing "African Dance", as well as the creation of several dance schools in both France and Senegal. She has been decorated by both countries, including being an Officer of the Ordre des Arts et des Lettres in France, and a Knight of the National Order of the Lion.

== Early life ==
Born in Benin in 1944 to a Senegalese civil servant, Germaine Acogny was also a descendant of the Yoruba people through her grandmother. When she was 10, the family moved to Dakar, Senegal, where she spent the remainder of her childhood. After showing a natural ability in dancing, she decided to pursue this as a career, moving to France in the 1960s to study modern dance and ballet at the École Simon-Siégel in Paris.

== Dance career ==
Upon her return to Senegal, she began to teach dance locally, both privately and as part of the local secondary education system. During this period she developed a new style, which she would later call the "African dance". After choreographing dance to the poem Femme Noir, Femme Nu, she came to the attention of the author - President Léopold Sédar Senghor of Senegal. After realising they had similar aspirations for African identity and culture, he sent her to work with choreographer Maurice Béjart in Brussels, Belgium. With the assistance of Senghor and Béjart, she founded Mudra Afrique, a school of dance in 1977.

While Béjart initially set the curriculum, which included Acogny's modern dance techniques. He eventually recruited more dance teachers from the United States and attempted to take over Acogny's portion of the curriculum; she confronted him and demanded she was made the sole director of the school instead. He agreed, and she combined the work of the foreign teachers with her own within the school. She continued to develop the African dance as an ongoing hybrid between modern western styles and traditional African techniques. In 1980, she wrote and published Danse Africaine (African Dance), which set the standard for Senegalese dance. She left Mudra Afrique in 1982.

Three years later, she founded Studio Ecole Ballet Theatre in Toulouse, France, alongside her husband Helmut Vogt. She returned to Senegal to in 1995, and opened the dance school l'Ecole des Sables there three years later. She involved the local villagers in the performances, with the studio set in the open air overlooking the ocean. Around the same time as the new school opened, she began collaborating with overseas choreographers such as Susanne Linke and Kota Yamasaki to with on her company Jant-Bi to develop three hour dances for evening performances. Between 1997 and 2000, she was the Artistic Director of the Dance section of the Paris-based Afrique en Creation.

On February 17, 2021, she received the Golden Lion for Lifetime Achievement by the Venice Dance Biennale.

== Awards ==
- Chevalier of the Order of Merit (France)
- Officer of the Ordre des Arts et des Lettres (France)
- Chavalier of the Legion of Honour (France)
- Knight of the National Order of the Lion (Senegal)
- Officier et Commandeur des Arts et Lettres (Senegal)
- "PioneerWoman" by the Senegalese Ministry of the Family and the National Solidarity (1999)
- Bessie Award, jointly with the Japanese Kota Yamazaki for the choreography Fagaala (New York, 2007)
- Bessie Award for performance in the solo Mon élue noire-sacre # 2 (New York, 2018)
- Award for Lifetime achievement in the field of choreography, movement and dance from the Cairo International Festival for Experimental and Contemporary Theatre (2018)
- ECOWAS Excellence Award in the category Arts and Letters (2019)
- Foundation for Contemporary Arts Grants to Artists award (2004)
- Golden Lion for Lifetime Achievement by the Venice Dance Biennale (2021).
