= Iván Markó =

Hungarian choreographer and ballet dancer (1947–2022)

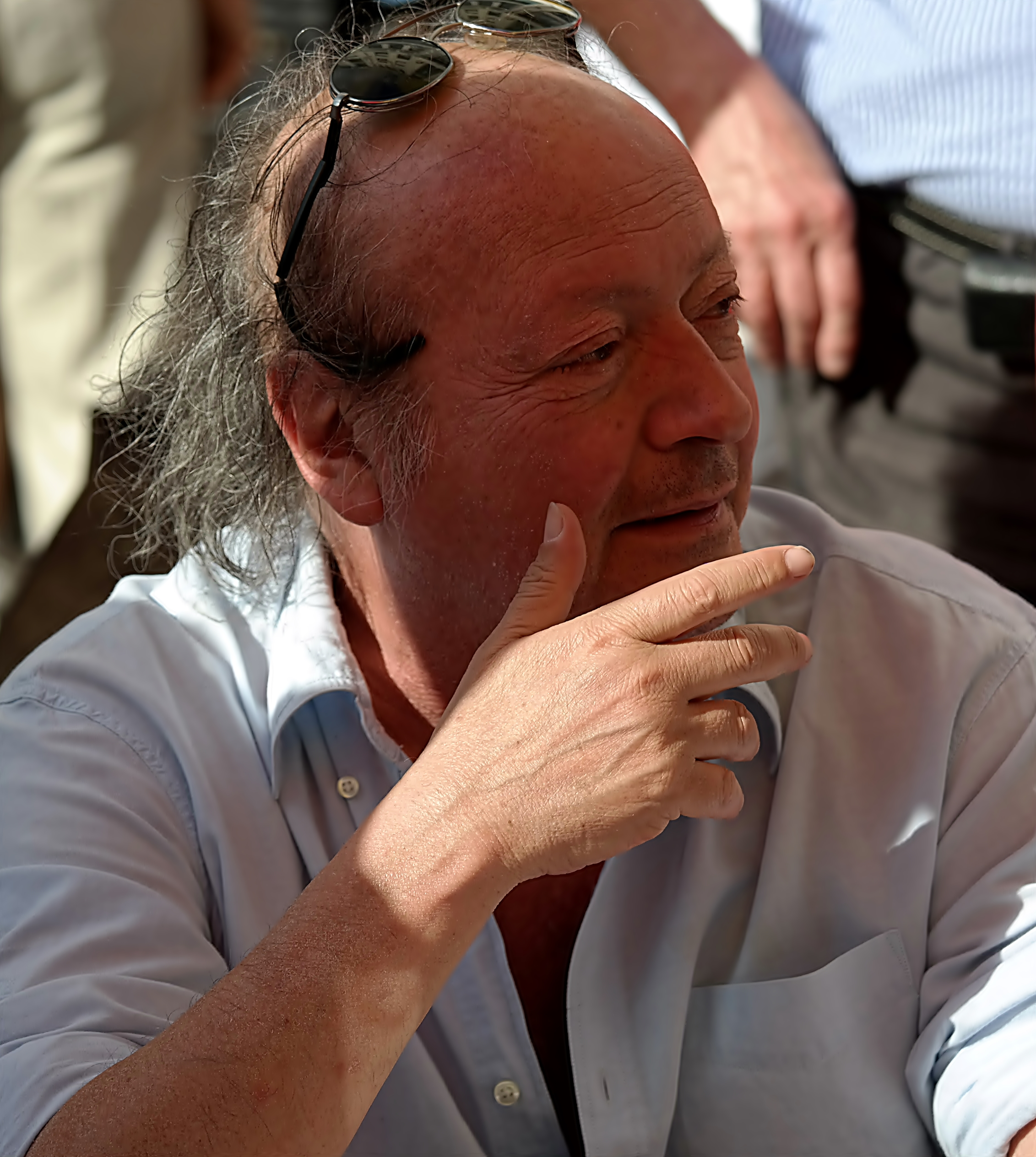
- Markó in 2014
- Born: 29 March 1947; Balassagyarmat, Hungary
- Died: 21 April 2022 (aged 75); Budapest, Hungary
- Occupation(s): Choreographer, ballet dancer

Iván Markó (29 March 1947 – 21 April 2022) was a Hungarian choreographer and ballet dancer.

== Biography ==
Markó was born in Balassagyarmat. He studied dancing at the Hungarian State Ballet Institute in Budapest. After having graduated in 1967, Markó joined the Hungarian State Opera, where he became a principal dancer in 1971.

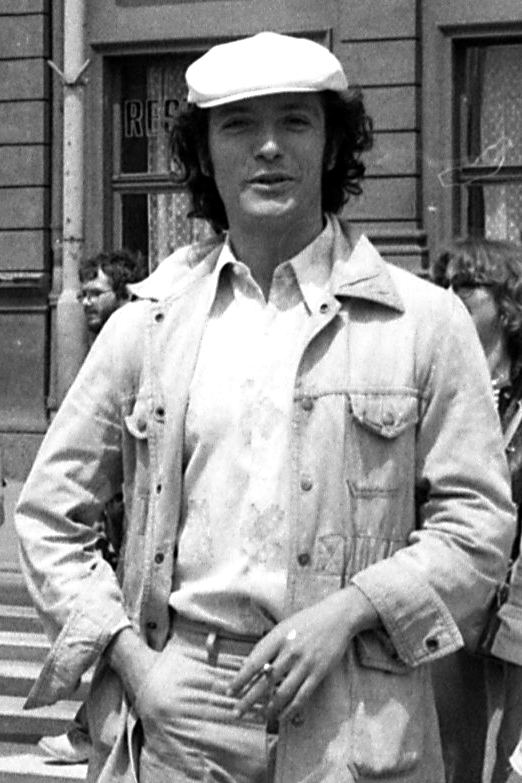
Markó in 1979

In 1972 dancer, choreographer and opera director Maurice Béjart invited Markó to his Ballet of the 20th Century. One of his best known roles was in Béjart's production of Stravinsky's Firebird.

In 1974 he was ranked as one of the top ten ballet dancers worldwide.

In 1979 Markó established the Győr Ballet in Győr, Hungary. He was director of the ensemble until 1991.

Markó was a choreographer for the Bayreuth Festival from 1985. He also worked at the Jerusalem Academy of Music and Dance, and as a guest choreographer for other companies.

In 1996, he established the Hungarian Ballet Festival.

Markó died in April 2022, at the age of 75.

== Awards in Hungary ==
Markó was a recipient of the Kossuth Prize in 1983, and was also a recipient of the Meritorious Artist Prize and SZOT Prize, and a member of the Society of Immortals from 2005. In 2007, Markó was awarded the Hungarian Order of Merit. He was also made an honorary citizen of his birthplace, Balassagyarmat. Markó was a recipient of the Prima Primissima Prize in 2008.
