= Hugues Gall =

French opera manager (1940–2024)

- Hugues Gall, c. 2000
- Born: 18 March 1940; Honfleur, France
- Died: 25 May 2024 (aged 84); Nice, France
- Education: Institut d'études politiques de Paris; Sorbonne
- Occupations: Opera manager; Cultural manager
- Organizations: Grand Théâtre de Genève; Paris Opera; Fondation Monet in Giverny
- Spouse: Éric Vu-An
- Awards: Légion d'honneur; Ordre national du Mérite; Ordre des Arts et des Lettres

Hugues Randolph Gall (French pronunciation: [yg gal]; 18 March 1940 – 25 May 2024) was a French opera manager who was head of the Grand Théâtre de Genève and the Paris Opera. He was director of the Fondation Monet in Giverny from 2008, and held many influential positions in cultural organisations.

== Life and career ==
Gall was born in Honfleur on 18 March 1940; his family had opposed the Nazi regime in Bavaria and fled to France. At age twelve he was fascinated by a concert conducted by Wilhelm Furtwängler. Gall attended the École Lémania boarding school in Lausanne, Switzerland from 1955 to 1959. He studied at the Institut d'études politiques de Paris and German literature at the Sorbonne.

Gall began his career in the offices of Edgar Faure at the Ministry of Agriculture and then at the Ministry of National Education; in the latter position, he was responsible for artistic education. He later created the music program of the baccalaureate and the artistic department of the University of Vincennes. He then joined the cabinet of Edmond Michelet at the Ministry of Culture.

In 1969, Gall became an assistant to Rolf Liebermann, and general secretary of the Réunion des théâtres lyriques nationaux, an organisation to converge the Paris Opera, with its Palais Garnier venue, and the Opéra-Comique, playing at the Salle Favart. Gall followed Liebermann to the Paris Opera in 1973. He was director of the Grand Théâtre de Genève from 1980 to 1995, where he was open to all operatic genres. He won Maurice Béjart to direct Mozart's Don Giovanni, conducted by Horst Stein with Ruggero Raimondi in the title role in 1980, and Salome by R. Strauss; Liebermann directed Wagner's Parsifal, and Robert Carsen first staged Boito's Mefistofele, to international recognition, and later Wagner's Lohengrin and Gounod's Faust. In 1984, Verdi's Un ballo in maschera was conducted by Riccardo Chailly, with Luciano Pavarotti. Gall initiated world premieres, of Girolamo Arrigo's Le Retour de Casanova, conducted by Reynald Giovaninetti in 1985, and of Liebermann's La Forêt conducted by Jeffrey Tate in 1987. During Gall's tenure, conductors of the Orchestre de la Suisse Romande also included Armin Jordan and Christian Thielemann, and singers such as Gwyneth Jones, Katia Ricciarelli and Leonie Rysanek performed as guests.

Gall was vice-director of the Paris Opera from 1993, and director from 1995 to 2004. He was responsible for the new venue Opera Bastille and the restoration of the Palais Garnier. During his tenure, 80 opera productions were created, including new commissions for the Bastille Opera, Philippe Fénelon's Salammbô, Philippe Manoury's K…, Pascal Dusapin's Perelà, uomo di fumo, and Matthias Pintscher's L'Espace dernier. 60 ballets new to the company were given, including Signes, choreographed by Carolyn Carlson, Clavigo by Roland Petit, Casanova by Angelin Preljocaj, Nosferatu by Jean-Claude Gallotta, and Wuthering Heights by Kader Belarbi. Gall achieved an attendance of 95% by the end of his tenure.

On 18 December 2002, Gall was elected a member of the Académie des Beaux-Arts From September 2004 to 2010, he was chairman of the board of the Institut pour le financement du cinéma et des industries culturelles. From 2005 to 2009, he was an extraordinary State Councillor; vice president of the Nureyev Foundation until 2009, member of the board of the Veolia Environnement corporate foundation until 2011. He was a member of the Chambre Professionnelle des Directions d'Opéra (CPDO). From 2002 to 2008, he chaired the jury of the International singing competition of Toulouse. In March 2008, he was elected by his colleagues at the Académie des Beaux-Arts as director of the Fondation Monet in Giverny and was re-elected to this position in March 2013.

At the end of March 2008, Gall was appointed chairman of the committee responsible for filling the position of director of the Villa Medici in Rome. On 28 October 2010, he was appointed for a five-year term as a qualified person chosen for their expertise in environmental and sustainable development issues at the French Economic, Social and Environmental Council (CESE).

On 17 February 2010, Valéry Giscard d'Estaing announced Gall's participation in the commission for reflection on the future of the Hôtel de la Marine chaired by the former president of the Republic. This commission brought together twelve personalities, members of the Institut de France, historians, former ministers and heads of cultural institutions.

Gall died in his house in Nice on 25 May 2024, at the age of 84.

== Awards ==
- Honorary citizen of Genève
- Commandeur of the Légion d'honneur
- Commandeur of the Ordre national du Mérite
- Commandeur of the Ordre des Arts et des Lettres
- Commandeur of the Palmes académiques

Preceded by Jean-Paul Cluzel	Director of the Paris Opera; 1995–2004	Succeeded by Gerard Mortier
