= Mune: Guardian of the Moon =

- French theatrical release poster
- Directed by: Alexandre Heboyan; Benoît Philippon
- Written by: Benoît Philippon; Jérôme Fansten
- Produced by: Dimitri Rassam; Aton Soumache; Alexis Vonarb
- Starring: Omar Sy; Izïa Higelin; Michaël Grégorio
- Edited by: Isabelle Malenfant
- Music by: Bruno Coulais
- Production companies: On Animation Studios; Onyx Films; Kinology; Orange Studio
- Distributed by: Paramount Pictures (France); Universal Pictures (select international territories)
- Release dates: 6 December 2014 (Forum des images); 14 October 2015 (France)
- Running time: 86 minutes
- Countries: France; Canada
- Languages: English; French
- Budget: $17 million
- Box office: $14.5 million

Mune: Guardian of the Moon (French: Mune, Le Gardien de la Lune) is a 2014 animated adventure fantasy film directed by Benoît Philippon and Alexandre Heboyan and written by Philippon and Jérôme Fansten. Featuring the voices of Michael Gregorio, Omar Sy and Izïa Higelin, the film tells the story of the guardian of the Moon, who must recover the stolen Sun. It premiered at Forum des images on December 6, 2014, and was theatrically released in France on October 14, 2015.

The film earned $14.5 million on a reported $17 million budget. It received positive reviews from critics, also getting nominations at the Annecy International Animated Film Festival for Cristal Award for Best Feature Film and the World Soundtrack Award for Soundtrack Composer of the Year for its music composer, Bruno Coulais. The film won the Young People's Jury Award at the TIFF Kids International Film Festival and the Best Film Award at the Tokyo Anime Awards.

== Plot ==
On a small planet whose inhabitants are made of natural materials, the first Guardians brought a small Sun and Moon to bring light to the world and preserve its harmony, traveling in colossal temple-like animals. Since then, despite their differences, the people of the day and night have lived in peace. However, Necross, a corrupted Guardian of the Sun who previously tried to steal the Sun before being defeated by the warrior Xolal and banished to the Underworld, awaits the opportunity to plunge the world into darkness.

In the present day, apprentice Guardians Sohone and Leeyoon prepare to take on the roles of Guardians of the Sun and Moon from Xolal and Yule. On the day of their induction, the light of the Sun accepts Sohone as planned, but the lunar Ewe chooses Mune, a young, inexperienced Faun boy, over Leeyoon.

After his imp servant Mox informs him of Xolal's retirement, Necross sees an opportunity to steal the Sun again. After the ceremony, Xolal and Yule teach their respective successors how to operate their Temples before dying, respectively becoming a statue and glowing tree. The following night, with Mune struggling to maneuver the Temple of the Moon, Necross sends Pale Snakes to corrupt Leeyoon and pit Sohone against Mune, and sends Mox and his partner Spleen to steal the Sun. As a result, night falls across the land and Mune is banished from his people.

Mune and Sohone set out to find the vanished Sun, with the wax girl Glim accompanying them. While in the Great Blue Hole, a lake containing an entrance to the depths of the world, the group meets Phospho, a former Guardian of the Moon from the same generation as Necross who gave up his position after failing to stop him. He leads them to the entrance of the Underworld before leaving.

Meanwhile, Leeyoon takes Mune's place in the Temple of the Moon, but is unable to control it. The Moon wanes and crumbles, causing the Temple to go out of control and fall into the Underworld, where Mune, Sohone and Glim are. Mune and Glim take care of the Moon while Sohone dives into the Underworld to recover the Sun. Mune figures out that he can calm the Temple of the Moon by using his powers, inspiring Phospho, who had watched from afar. Leeyoon admits to him that the Moon is lost, but Mune and Glim go into the Moon Quarry, which Yule had informed Mune of before dying, to create a new moon. Mune and Glim develop feelings for each other as Leeyoon apologizes to Mune, recognizing him as the true Guardian of the Moon.

With the task done, Mune and Glim rejoin Sohone in the World of Darkness and find him surrounded by Pale Snakes attempting to corrupt him. However, Phospho intervenes and sacrifices himself to rescue Sohone and destroy the Snakes. Sohone, Mune and Glim confront Necross and his Imps while Glim finds and revives the Sun, melting in the process. As Necross is about to crush Mune and Sohone, the Sun and the Moon unite and empower them. After Mune uses his Dream powers to defeat Necross by putting him to sleep, Mune realizes that a Pale Snake was influencing Necross, Pulls it out of his body and destroys it, Freeing Necross from its control. This restores him to his original appearance and transforms him into a statue as the Underworld becomes a paradise.

Afterwards, the two Guardians restore the normal trajectories of the Sun, the Moon, and their Temples. With help from the Sun and Moon's power, Mune revives Glim and gives her the ability to maintain her body regardless of temperature. Mune and Glim meet up and kiss before going around the world on the Temple of the Moon.

== Voice cast ==
Character	French voice actor	English dubbing actor	
Character	French voice actor	2014 version	2017 version
Mune	Michaël Grégorio	Joshua J. Ballard	Joshua J. Ballard
Glim	Izïa Higelin	Nicole Provost	Nicole Provost
Sohone	Omar Sy	Trevor Devall	Rob Lowe
Leeyoon	Féodor Atkine	Michael Dobson	Christian Slater
Necross	Eric Herson-Macarel	Davey Grant	Davey Grant
Mox	Michel Mella	Sam Vincent	Patton Oswalt
Spleen	Fabrice Josso	Brian Drummond	Ed Helms
Phospho	Patrick Poivey	Davey Grant	Jeff Dunham
Xolal	Jean Claude Donda	Michael Dobson	Michael Dobson
Yule	Benoît Allemane	Paul Dobson	Paul Dobson
Glim's Father	Patrick Prejean	Jonathan Love	Jonathan Love
Mune's Father	Damien Boisseau	Jonathan Love	Jonathan Love
Krrrack	Patrice Dozier	Rob Shields	Rob Shields
Zucchini	Emmanuel Curtil	Trevor Devall	Trevor Devall
The Snakes	Paolo Domingo	Paul Dobson	Paul Dobson
The Spiders	Alexandre Heboyan	Alexandre Heboyan	Alexandre Heboyan

== Production ==
The original idea of the film was born from a project from writer Benoît Philippon, who planned to start a short live-action film in an atmosphere inspired by Terry Gilliam films that would tell the story of a character who lives in a forest and wins the Moon after spearing it with a rope. The project soon proved to be unfeasible in a short format, and so Philippon began turning it into a feature film project. He developed and created an original universe with its cosmogony and inhabitants related to the Sun and the Moon. The universe further formed with the contributions of Nicolas Marlet, who designed the characters, and Aurelian Prédal, who was the film's artistic director. The human characters were designed as hybrids between human beings, animals, and various materials. Mune is a woodland creature with fur and is related to the night; his shy and taciturn nature is inspired by the main character of Edward Scissorhands. Sohone is linked to the Sun and his body is made from amber; his "big mouth" personality is inspired by characters like Buzz Lightyear from Toy Story and Han Solo from Star Wars. Glim is made from wax, which makes her fragile and endangered when exposed to sunlight, but through this the film is able to show a character with a disability who succeeds through her courage. Necross and his two imps, Mox and Spleen, are volcanoes, giving the film's crew the opportunity to work with lava and soot textures.

The script was co-written by Benoît Philippon and Jerome Fansten. The film underwent several rewrites, including changes that were made while writing the storyboard for its visual development, which saw the birth of new ideas, including the mobile temples. The stakes of the plot were defined early on, being the idea of characters searching for the Sun, which was like a Holy Grail. The challenge of the project was to develop a classic film that would be understandable by a wide audience, including younger people, without sacrificing originality and the poetry of the world. The film was directed mainly in CGI, except for scenes depicting the planet's past and those taking place in the world of dreams, which were done using 2D animation.

== Music and soundtrack ==
The film's original music was composed and orchestrated by Bruno Coulais, who was also the composer of Coraline and Song of the Sea. The soundtrack, which was released on October 16, 2015, contains “Happy” written and performed by C2C and Derek Martin. The Japanese version uses the song "Rescue Me" by Julie as its ending theme.

== Release ==
The film premiered in France at Forum des images on 6 December 2014 and in North America at the New York International Children's Film Festival on 14 March 2015. The film was part of the official selection at the Annecy International Animated Film Festival in 2015.

The film was released in cinemas in France on 14 October 2015 by Paramount Pictures. In France on the day of its release, Mune: Guardian of the Moon did relatively well in Paris, with a startup to 457 entries on 14 screens where it was being shown, ranking fifth among films released that day. In its first week, the film had 128, 279 entries. By the end of 2015, Mune: Guardian of the Moon had a combined total of 524,000 entries and was one of 100 French films that attracted the most viewers in 2015.

A 12-page manga that was officially approved by the director was made to promote the film's Japanese release.

In the United States, GKIDS released the film to theaters for a one-day only event on August 12, 2017. In contrast to the original dub, their release redubbed some of the voices with Rob Lowe, Christian Slater, Patton Oswalt, Ed Helms and Jeff Dunham. It had a home video release on September 26, 2017, by Universal Pictures Home Entertainment.

== Reception ==
On the review aggregator website Rotten Tomatoes, 80% of 5 critics' reviews are positive, with an average rating of 6.30/10.

During its release in France in October 2015, Mune: Guardian of the Moon was well received by French press critics. The main recognised qualities of the film are its aesthetics and its world, the latter considered poetic and original. In the French free daily 20 Minutes, Caroline Vié speaks of "extraordinary aesthetics" and she believes that the film "surprises people constantly with its inventiveness." In Première, Christopher Narbinne speaks about an "inventive artistic direction" and about "unique character designs". In L'Express, Eric Libiot maintains that the film is "splendid and moving" and shows that "French animation is in a really good shape" with an "ambitious" animation and a universe that "intermingles mythology, is universal and tries to remain open for all". In the women's magazine Elle, Helena Villovith judges that "the poetic quality of the characters, the richness of the setting and the mood of the dreamlike sequences do not have to pale before classics such as Toy Story or Princess Mononoke."

Critics were divided on the quality of the script. In L'Express, Eric Libiot judges it "beautiful and intelligent"; he describes the scenario as "romantic" and appreciates that it "escalates to a progressive film" and that "the pace of it takes its time voluntarily". In Le Dauphiné Libéré, Jean Serroy believes that it is all "very inventive in terms of characters and adventures, perfect for a family viewing". In Le Journal du dimanche, Barbara Théate saw the film as a "story for toddlers, rich with wacky characters and fun twists". It is "an original work with sophistication" according to Philippe Lauguche from Quest France. The Télérama magazine considers it "magical and terrifically effective" under the pen of Guillemette Odicino, who recognises various influences: the faun Mune reminds him of the world of Luc Besson, Glim that of Tim Burton, while the marvelous creatures remind him of the films of Hayao Miyazaki and the paintings of Salvador Dalí. In the film magazine Première, Christophe Narbonne recognises a certain poetry to the film, but finds the scenario "very formal" and he thinks that it does not live up to its aesthetics. In her review for Elle, Helena Villovitch regrets that "the only girl's role is decorative, fluttering her eyelashes and admiring the prowess of males who get promoted to positions of responsibility. Still, she's the one we love the most!"

== Awards ==
The film was submitted as one of the 27 animated feature films in consideration for the Best Animated Feature for the 89th Academy Awards.

=== Accolades ===
Award / Film Festival	Category	Recipients and nominees	Result
Annecy International Animated Film Festival	Cristal Award for Best Feature Film		Nominated
TIFF Kids International Film Festival	Young People's Jury Award		Won
Stockholm Film Festival Junior	6-10 ages Best Film Award		Won
Tokyo Anime Award	Best Film Award		Won
World Soundtrack Award	Soundtrack Composer of the Year	Bruno Coulais	Nominated
