= Émile Thielens =

Belgian architect (Antwerp)

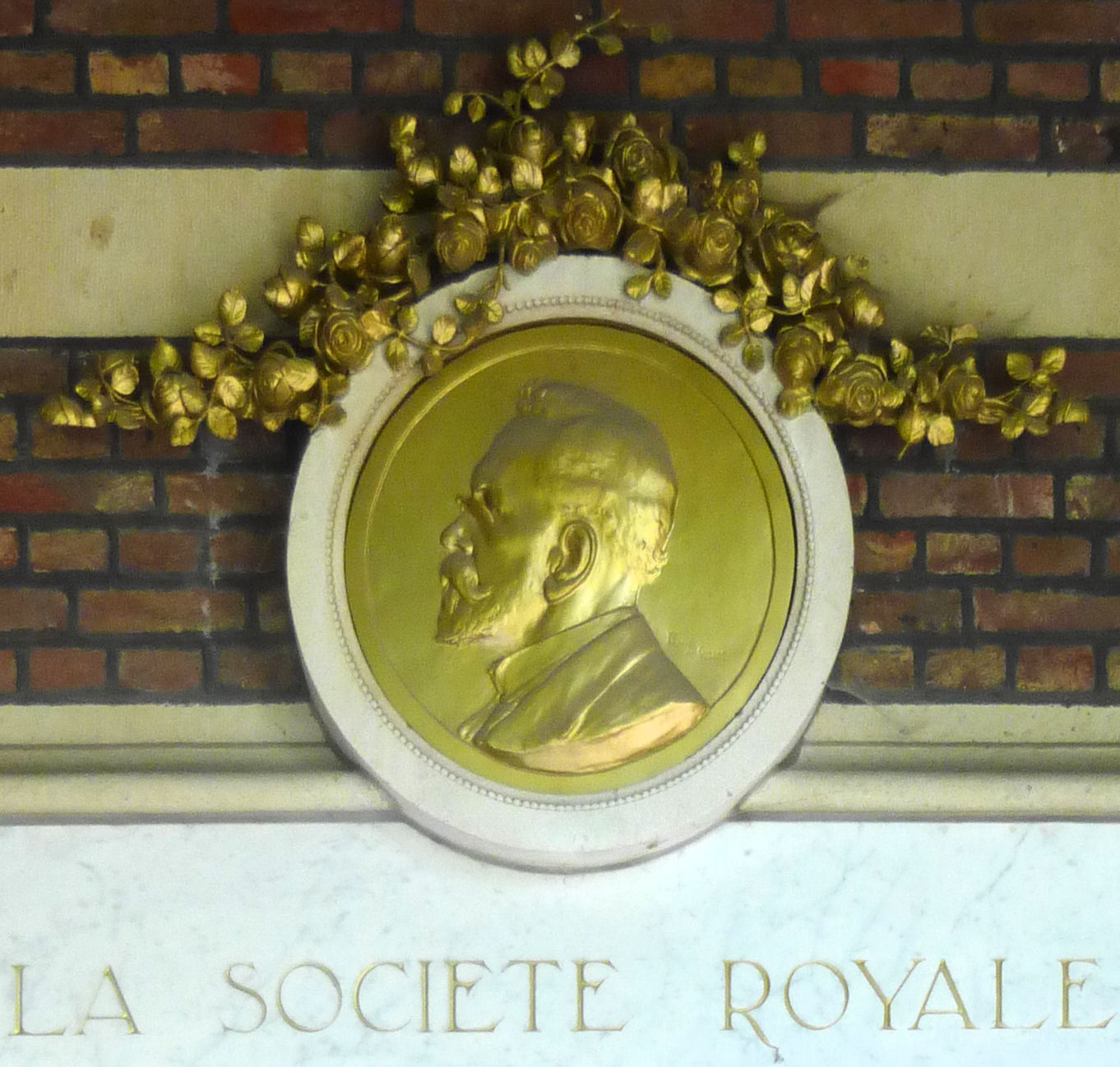
Medaillon arch. Em. Thielens

Émile Thielens (1854–1911) was a Belgian architect. He designed the Queen Elisabeth Hall, Café-restaurant Paon Royal, and buildings at the Antwerp Zoo.
