= André LeClair =

Canadian-American physicist and academic

- Born: Madawaska, Maine
- Occupation: Physicist
- Awards: National Young Investigator Award, NSF (1993); Alfred P. Sloan Foundation Fellowship (1992)

Academic background
- Education: B.S., Physics; Ph.D., Physics
- Alma mater: Massachusetts Institute of Technology; Harvard University
- Thesis: BS Thesis: Compton Scattering off Quarks; Ph.D. Thesis: String Field Theory

Academic work
- Institutions: Cornell University

André LeClair is a Canadian-American theoretical physicist and professor of physics at Cornell University. His research has included quantum field theory, mathematical physics, integrable systems, statistical mechanics, condensed-matter theory, and mathematical aspects of the Riemann hypothesis.

== Education ==
He received a Bachelor of Science degree in physics from the Massachusetts Institute of Technology in 1982. He subsequently earned a Doctor of Philosophy degree in physics from Harvard University in 1987. His doctoral dissertation was titled String Field Theory and the Multiloop String S-Matrix.

== Career ==
After completing his doctorate, LeClair was a research associate at Princeton University from 1987 to 1989. He joined Cornell University in 1989 as an assistant professor of physics. He was promoted to associate professor in 1995 and to professor in 2003.

== Research ==
=== Quantum field theory and integrable systems ===
A part of LeClair's early research concerned two-dimensional conformal field theory, integrable quantum field theories, and quantum symmetries. In work with Denis Bernard, he studied quantum group symmetries and non-local conserved currents in two-dimensional quantum field theory.

LeClair also investigated the relationship between quantum groups and integrable models, including work on affine quantum symmetries and generalized supersymmetry. In collaboration with Cumrun Vafa, he studied quantum affine symmetry as a form of generalized supersymmetry.

His research on integrable quantum field theories also included finite-temperature correlation functions. A paper with Giuseppe Mussardo developed a formalism for calculating finite-temperature correlation functions in integrable quantum field theories.

=== Statistical mechanics and condensed-matter physics ===
LeClair has applied quantum field-theoretical methods to problems in statistical mechanics and condensed-matter physics.

He studied renormalization-group limit cycles and their relationship to integrable models. His work with Germán Sierra examined cyclic renormalization-group flows and related field theories.

LeClair has also investigated the statistical mechanics of quantum gases. His work has used S-matrix methods to study interacting Bose and Fermi gases in low dimensions.

His research has included applications to topological insulators and disordered fermionic systems, including studies of edge states and quantum Hall phenomena.

His research has included the classification of non-hermitian hamiltonians which extends the Wigner/Dyson, and Altland/Zirnbauer classifications.

=== The Riemann Hypothesis and Physics ===
LeClair has proposed two approaches towards understanding the validity of the Riemann Hypothesis based on physics. One is based on the universal exponent 1/2 for random walks, which is exactly the real part of the non-trivial zeros. In another approach he established the result that if there is a unique solution for every integer to the Franca-LeClair equation, then the Riemann Hypothesis is true. More recently he has constructed a physical model a fermion scattering with impurities whose quantized energies satisfy a Bethe ansatz equation which exactly correspond to the Riemann zeros.

== Awards and honors ==
- 1992 – Fellowship, Alfred P. Sloan Foundation
- 1993 – National Young Investigator Award, National Science Foundation

== Selected articles ==
- LeClair, André; Mussardo, Giuseppe. "Finite temperature correlation functions in integrable QFT". Nuclear Physics B. 552, 1999.
- LeClair, André; Sierra, Germán. "Renormalization group limit-cycles and field theories for elliptic S-matrices". Journal of Statistical Mechanics: Theory and Experiment. 2004.
- LeClair, Andre. "An electrostatic depiction of the validity of the Riemann hypothesis and a formula for the Nth zero at large N." International Journal of Modern Physics A 28.30 (2013): 1350151.
- LeClair, André; Mussardo, Giuseppe. "Riemann zeros as quantized energies of scattering with impurities". Journal of High Energy Physics. 2024.
- Bernard, Denis, and André LeClair. "A classification of 2D random Dirac fermions." Journal of Physics A: Mathematical and General 35.11 (2002): 2555-2567.
- Bernard, Denis, and André LeClair. "A classification of non-Hermitian random matrices." Statistical Field Theories. Dordrecht: Springer Netherlands, 2002. 207-214.
- França, Guilherme, and André LeClair. "Transcendental equations satisfied by the individual zeros of Riemann ζ, Dirichlet and modular L-functions." Communications in Number Theory and Physics 9.1 (2015): 1-50.
- LeClair, André. "Spectral flow for the Riemann zeros." arXiv preprint arXiv:2406.01828 (2024).
