= Bessières station =

Lausanne Metro station

Bessières
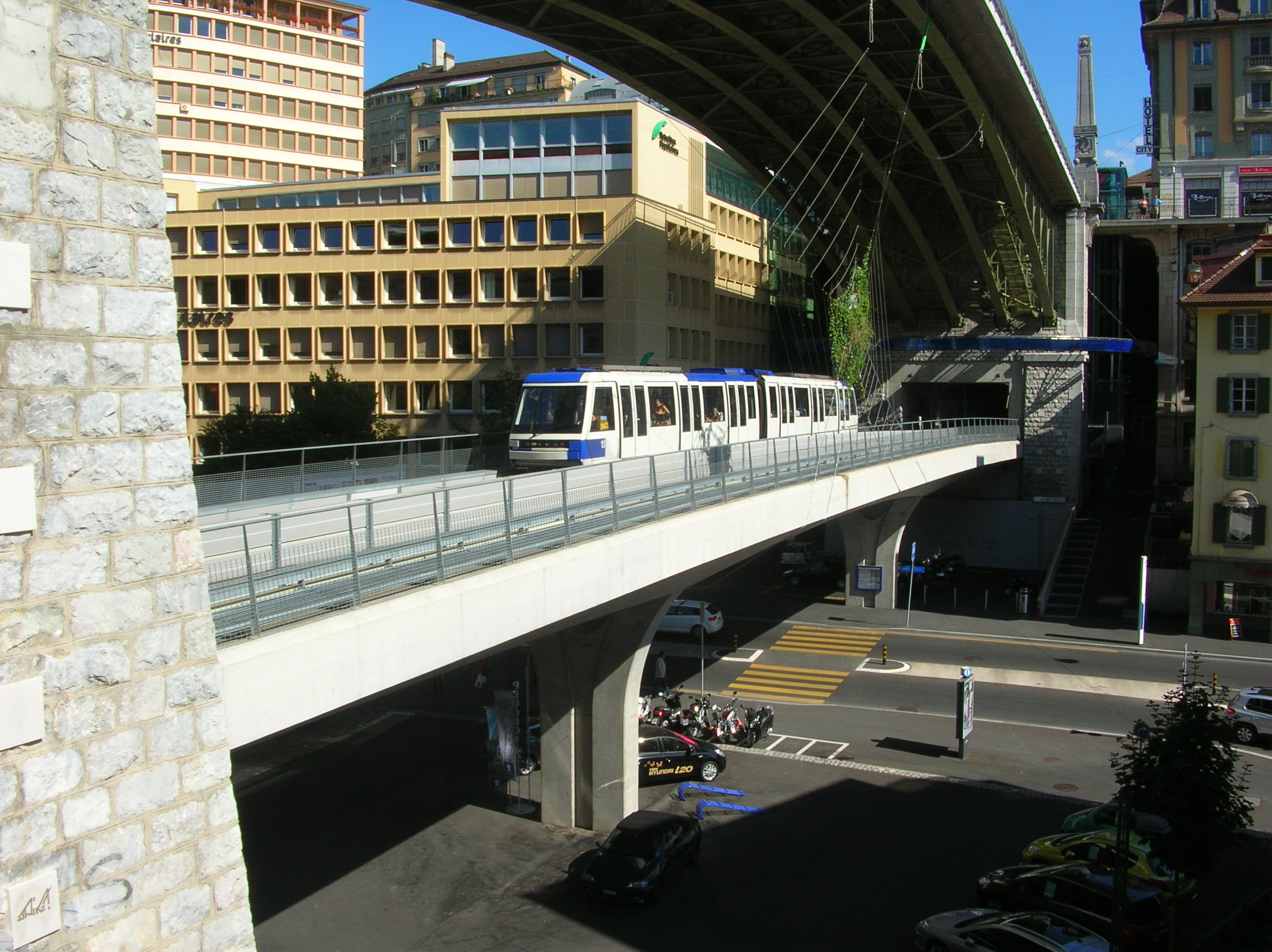
- Pont Saint-Martin Lausanne

General information
- Location: Switzerland
- Coordinates: 46°31′14.9″N 6°38′13.1″E
- System: Lausanne Metro station
- Line: Line M2

History
- Opened: 27 October 2008

Services
Preceding station	Lausanne Metro	Following station
Riponne–Maurice Béjart towards Ouchy-Olympique	M2	Ours towards Croisettes
Location

Bessières is a Lausanne Metro station on Line M2. It was opened on 27 October 2008 as part of the inaugural section of the line, from Croisettes to Ouchy–Olympique. The station is located between Ours and Riponne–Maurice Béjart.
