= Dušanka Sifnios =

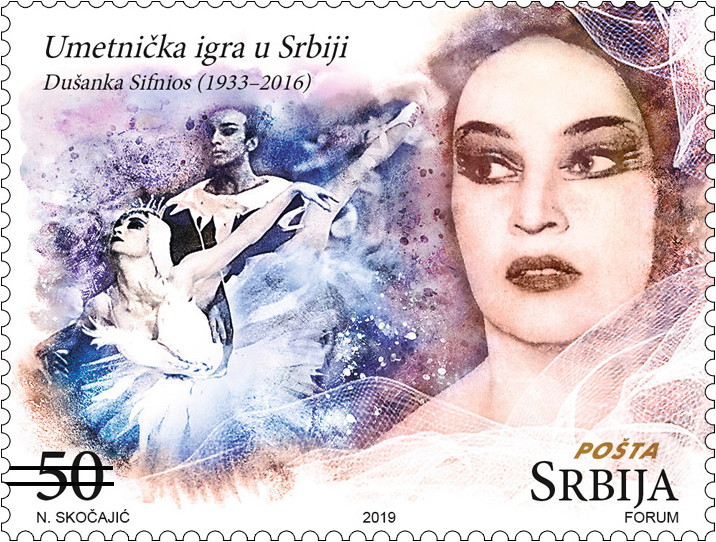
- Born: Dušanka Sifnios; 15 October 1933; Skoplje, Kingdom of Yugoslavia
- Died: 14 October 2016 (aged 82); Brussels, Belgium
- Occupation: Ballerina
- Years active: 1951–1980
- Spouse: André Vandernoot
- Children: Alexandra Vandernoot; Patrick Vandernoot

Dušanka Sifnios (Serbian Cyrillic: Душанка Сифниос; 15 October 1933 – 14 October 2016), also known as Duška Sifnios, was a Serbian ballerina and choreographer, considered one of the most distinguished and internationally most successful Serbian ballerinas. The pinnacle of her career was in the 1960s, achieved through her work with Maurice Béjart when she was one of the most popular ballerinas in the world.

== Early life and education ==
Sifnios was born on 15 October 1933 in Skoplje, Kingdom of Yugoslavia (now Skopje, North Macedonia). She became member of the National Theatre in Belgrade in 1951, and in 1953 graduated from the ballet gymnasium in the class of Nina Kirsanova. Later, she was also tutored by great choreographers Leonid Lavrovsky, Asaf Messerer and Victor Gsovsky.

== Career ==
=== National Theatre ===
Noticing Sifnios's talent, Kirsanova almost immediately placed her a soloist and soon she became a prima ballerina. Her early performances were choreographed by Dimitrije Parlić, and included Eurydice in Orpheus by Igor Stravinsky and Juliet in Sergey Prokofiev's Romeo and Juliet. Other roles, choreographed by Pino Mlakar, Milko Šparemblek, Ugo Dell’ara, Vera Kostić and Anica Prelić, include a string of first-class performances like Swanhilde (Coppélia by Léo Delibes), Ela (The Devil in the village by Fran Lhotka), La reine des iles by Maurice Thiriet and Les Sylphides by Chopin.

Her two most successful roles in this period, however, were Giselle, by Adolphe Adam, and The Girl in The Miraculous Mandarin, by Béla Bartók. Mandarin was choreographed by Parlić in 1957, while Giselle was revived in Belgrade by Lavrovsky and marked a turning point in Sifnios' career. She performed it 177 times in The National Theatre and went on an extensive touring of Europe: Venice, Edinburgh. Vienna, Wiesbaden, Florence, Rome, Zürich, Berlin and Paris, with Giselle becoming a great success in Bolshoy Theatre in Moscow.

=== International career ===
In 1958 she moved to Paris and became a member of Milorad Mišković ‘s dance company and then Léonide Massine’s Ballet Europeo in Rome in 1959.

=== Boléro and Ballet of the 20th Century ===
Sifnios dancing on the tabletop in Boléro

In Rome in 1960 she was noticed by Maurice Béjart and became a member of his dance troop Ballet of the 20th Century and his muse. Especially for her, Béjart choreographed Maurice Ravel's Boléro, which is today considered a masterpiece of the modern ballet. It premiered on 10 January 1961, featuring Sifnios dancing on the tabletop, first stepping to the tune's simplicity, surrounded by seated men, who, in turn, slowly participate in the dance, adding complexity to the building in the orchestration, culminating in a climactic union of the dancers atop the table. Sifnios became world-famous. After her, the role was later performed by Maya Plisetskaya, Sylvie Guillem, Grazia Galante, Angèle Albrecht and, in the male version, by Jorge Donn.

As a principal dancer of the company, she toured Europe (France, Germany, Poland, Italy, Spain, Great Britain, Belgium), Africa (Tunisia), Asia (Israel, Lebanon) and Latin America (Mexico, Argentina, Cuba), performing the roles in Les quatre fils Aymon by Fernand Schirren (1961), Matiére by Alban Berg (1962), The Wedding (1962) and The Firebird (1964) by Stravinsky, Symphony No. 9 by Beethoven (1964), L’art de la barre by Johann Sebastian Bach (1965), Cantates by Anton Webern (1966) and Abraxas by Werner Egk.

She appeared in televised ballet La Boutique fantasque by Gioacchino Rossini/Ottorino Respighi, in TV dance versions of The Blue Danube by Johann Strauss II and The Tales of Hoffmann by Jacques Offenbach (for Bavarian Television) and in the movie Boléro.

=== Later career ===
Sifnios was a freelance dancer from 1970, but she continued to work with the Ballet of the 20th Century as a guest artist. She retired at the age of 47.

In the early 2000s she co-choreographed several ballets in Belgrade, including the revival of The Miraculous Mandarin in 2001 in the National Theatre and Liederabend by Gustav Mahler in 2002 in Madlenianum Opera and Theatre.

She published an autobiography Beleške slavne balerine in 2013 (Notes of a famous ballerina) even though she stated in an interview that she does not think of her as a ballerina but as a "woman who dances".

== Awards ==
She received an award for life achievement, the highest accolade of the "Association of the ballet artists of Serbia" in 1998 and was a recipient of the "Special recognition for artistic contribution to the national culture of Serbia", colloquially styled national pension in 2007.

Madlenianum Opera has named one of its halls "Sifnios Hall", in ballerina's honor. The hall is mainly intended for educational ballet work.

== Style ==
Early in her career, Sifnios was noted for her classical ballet technique. She was described as having a strong command of classical ballet technique and as performing complex choreography with ease. Her dancing was characterized by secure technique, clear lines, and a distinctive stage presence. She later focused on modern ballet and developed a distinctive style combining technical skill with expressive intensity.

On the very first rehearsal for Boléro, Béjart’s told her to take off her shoes. She continued to perform often without shoes, earning the nickname “barefoot ballerina”.

== Personal life ==
On meeting her husband, Belgian conductor André Vandernoot, Sifnios said in an interview that Boléro gave her a husband, too: ”Before one of the performances, Béjart told me not to pay attention on anyone else and to look only at the conductor. I listened to him, watched at the conductor, the Belgian, and later married him, had two children and lived through so many things”. They had two children, daughter Alexandra Vandernoot, an actress, and son, Patrick Vandernoot, a golf instructor.

She died on 14 October 2016, one day before her 83rd birthday, in Brussels, after four months of illness.
