= André Vandernoot =

Belgian conductor

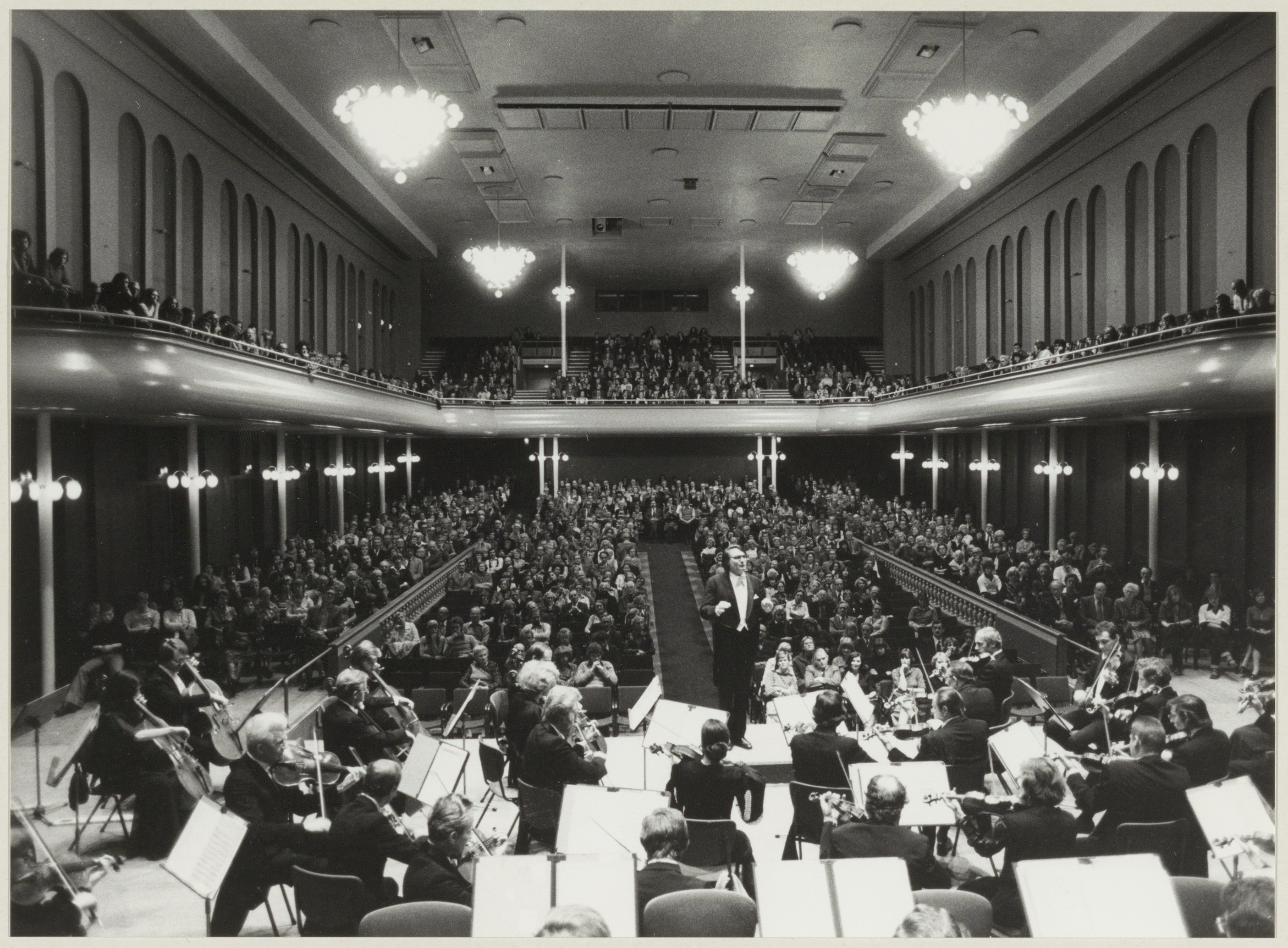
André Vandernoot conducting (1976)

André Vandernoot (born 2 June 1927, Brussels; died 6 November 1991, Brussels) was a Belgian conductor. He studied at the Royal Music Conservatory in Brussels, and later flute and conducting at the Hochschule für Musik, Vienna. In 1951, he was a prize-winner in a conducting competition in Besançon, France.

From 1959 to 1973, Vandernoot was conductor and artistic director of La Monnaie. For the 1974–1975 season, he was artistic director of the Belgian National Orchestra. From 1975 to 1983, he was chief conductor of deFilharmonie (Antwerp), which is now called Antwerp Symphony Orchestra. He was also director of the Noord Philharmonic Orchestra (Haarlem) from 1978 to 1979. From 1979 to 1989, he was chief conductor of the Symphony Orchestra of the RTBF in Brussels. During the 1980s, he worked as artistic director and permanent conductor of Het Brabants Orkest (Tilburg).

In December 1968 Belgian television broadcast Tristan und Isolde as a ten-part television serial, filmed in a variety of outside locations, conducted by Vandernoot. The cast included Claude Heater as Tristan, Jacqueline Van Quaille as Isolde, Maryse Patris as Brangaene with Marke sung by Josef Greindl, but acted by Maurice de Groote.

His recordings include the Tchaikovsky Violin Concerto with Leonid Kogan and the Orchestre de la Société des concerts du Conservatoire (1956, EMI), and the Beethoven concerto with the same soloist and orchestra, (1957, EMI), Mozart violin concertos with Christian Ferras and the Orchestre de la Société des concerts du Conservatoire (EMI) and Mahler, Kindertotenlieder with Christa Ludwig and the Philharmonia Orchestra (1958, EMI).

He was married to Yugoslavian ballerina Dušanka Sifnios and they had two children: daughter Alexandra Vandernoot, an actress, and son, Patrick Vandernoot, golf instructor.

Cultural offices
Preceded by Enrique Jorda	Chief Conductor, deFilharmonie; 1975–1983	Succeeded by Emil Tchakarov
