= Éric Vu-An =

French dancer and choreographer (1964–2024)

- Born: Éric Binh Vu-An; 3 January 1964; Paris, France
- Died: 8 June 2024 (aged 60); Nice, France
- Education: École de Danse
- Occupations: Dancer; choreographer; actor
- Spouse: Hugues Gall

Éric Binh Vu-An (3 January 1964 – 8 June 2024) was a French dancer, choreographer, and actor.

== Early life and education ==
Born in Paris on 3 January 1964, Vu-An's father was Guadeloupean and his mother was Vietnamese. He enrolled in the École de Danse in 1974 after his recruitment by Claude Bessy and an age exemption from the Ministry of Labour.

== Career ==
In 1982, he began his first soloist roles at the Paris Opera Ballet. He was cast as the lead in a production of Don Quixote by Rudolf Nureyev in 1983 before Maurice Béjart gave him the lead in Boléro. A dispute arose in March 1986 between Béjard and Nureyev over the announcement of Vu-An and Manuel Legris as a danseur étoile. The dispute was settled in Nureyev's favor, with Legris becoming a danseur étoile.

Vu-An then left the Paris Opera and joined the Grand Théâtre de Bordeaux, where he served as head of ballet from 1995 to 1997. On 1 January 2005, he was named a ballet master associated with the leader of the Ballet National de Marseille, Frédéric Flamand.

In 2009, Vu-An became artistic director of ballet at the Opéra de Nice. In 2018, a post made on Mediapart accused him of "managing his troupe with a feeling of omnipotence" and that he harassed pregnant dancers. One of the dancers, Gaëla Pujol, filed a complaint against him for harassment. Pujol alleged that the behavior was recurring and that she could provide testimony from fellow dancers and victims. However, Vu-An denounced the allegations. On 24 April 2018, it was announced that officials in Nice would investigate the claims. However, Vu-An was not indicted for his action due to lack of evidence, and the presiding judge dismissed the case on 11 July 2022. An investigating chamber in Aix-en-Provence upheld the dismissal on 30 March 2023.

== Death ==
Vu-An was diagnosed with a brain tumour in early 2022. He died in Nice on 8 June 2024, at the age of 60, two weeks after his husband, Hugues Gall, died.

== Filmography ==
=== Film ===
- The Sheltering Sky (1990)
- Bitter Sugar (1998)

=== Television ===
- Patron sur mesure (2002)
- Les Liaisons dangereuses (2003)

== Distinctions ==
- Prix Carpeaux (1982)
- Prix Nijinski (1986)
- Officer of the Ordre national du Mérite (2008)
- Commander of the Ordre des Arts et des Lettres (2011)
- Officer of the Legion of Honour (2016)
