= Mudra Afrique =

Senegalese dance school

The Mudra Afrique (or, Centre Africain de Perfectionnement et de Recherche des Interprètes du Spectacle Mudra Afrique) was a school founded in Dakar, Senegal in 1977 by Léopold Sédar Senghor, Maurice Béjart and the UNESCO based on multiculturalism and a Pan-African philosophy of uniting the African through the commonalities in the different ways of artistic self-expression throughout the continent and the world, thus creating a universal artistic culture. The school closed in 1983 but a significant number of its students went on to successful international careers., such as the Burkinabe choreographer, dancer, actor and artist Irene Tassembedo, Carole Alexis choreographer and Director of Carole Alexis Ballet Theatre / Ballet des Amériques company and conservatory located in New York and Djoniba Mouflet Founder and Director of the Djoniba Dance and Drum center in New York . Mudra Afrique played a crucial role in preparing the basis for contemporary, modern and neo-classical African dance by training the first generation of “modern and classical” African dancers according to international artistic standards.

== History of the School ==
The name of the school comes from the Sanskrit term “mudra” meaning “gesture” or “sign. The school, once located where the Court of Cassation in Dakar is currently housed, was founded in 1977 by Leopolod Sédar Senghor and Maurice Béjart and funded by Senegal and Belgium, with support from UNESCO. Germaine Acogny, a Senegalese dancer and choreographer originally from Benin, who is probably the best-known and most influential forerunner of contemporary dance in the West-African region, was appointed director of the school from its opening. Mudra Afrique, with an international student body, emphasized the Senghorian concepts of both enracinement and ouverture, rootedness and openness. The school was based on the premise that dance could be used to connect distinctly different African cultures. Students received training in African, contemporary, and classical dance, as well as in African drumming. They performed in Dakar but also in villages outside the capital. Acogny describes Mudra Afrique as “the sacred grove of modern time”, a place where Senghor’s Pan-African ambitions could live on in this space, which provided a platform for dancers from all over the continent and further afield to come to work, meet other artists, and be inspired.

== Influence on Other Dance Schools ==
Many non-Senegalese African dancers, who went on to found their own schools, attended Mudra Afrique, and so its multidisciplinary training greatly influenced dance across West Africa.

This includes Germaine Acogny, the former director of Mudra Afrique, who established her own African contemporary dance school, École des Sables, in Senegal in 2004, based on the same Pan-African principles which inspired Mudra Afrique. The school is now a platform for choreographers from all over the world and for African dancers aspiring to an international career. She explains her conception of contemporary African dance saying “the artistic movement into which I insert my own work, even though it is deeply rooted in popular traditions, is not at all a return to roots. On the contrary, we pursue a way that is altogether different and resolutely urban, reflecting the modern context within which so many of us, Africans of our time, must live and move and have our being. The Africa of sky-scrapers, the Africa of international alliances”. By contrast with Mudra Afrique, however, funding for this school did not come from African states but from French and European agencies, private charities in Europe and North America, and from fee-paying students from outside Africa.

Other examples include the awarded choreographer Carole Alexis who founded Ballet des Amériques in New York. Irène Tassembedo from Burkina Faso, who founded her own dance school, École Danse Irène Tassembedo (EDIT), in 2009 in Ouagadougou and developed an international career popularizing African contemporary dance. Laurent Longafo from the Democratic Republic of the Congo (DRC) also introduced Germaine Acogny’s dance techniques to a wider university student population. Maurice Béjart had already established a dance school called École Mudra in Belgium in 1970, which closed in 1988.

== Critiques of the School ==
The school served as a showcase for Senegal’s advanced artistic initiatives, which were elaborated and complicated by the dancers it trained. Since the foundation of Mudra Afrique in 1977, however, France and other European countries have been financing the choreographic arts in Africa via training, workshops, and space, using cultural agencies attached to the French Ministry of Foreign Affairs. This necessitates that performers respond to the artistic demands of these institutions, which raises concerns over creative agency and drives choreographic standardization towards European and away from African. Thus, efforts for self-determination by African performing artists deliberately opposing ongoing French cultural hegemony are coupled with a search for alternative frameworks of artistic development, following a strategy of diversification in a dual sense: broadening the range of potential donors and gaining access to new politico-economic resources by promoting “cultural diversity”. An example of this are both EDIT (École Danse Irène Tassembedo) and École des Sable, which show the trend of combining profit-making with a “cultural exchange” and a political and social development agenda.

The new “choreographic movement” born out of transnational African collaboration has become more and more male-dominated with regards to international visibility, which is contrasted against the important role played by women such as Germaine Acogny and Irène Tassembedo, who are considered to be among the avant-garde of contemporary dance in Africa. Given the family backgrounds of these dancing pioneers, who were part of the social, political, and economic elite during the first decades of national independence and enjoyed state patronage, the current underrepresentation of female choreographers might be explained by the professionalization and opening of the dancing field towards less-privileged social spheres and groups, with the unfortunate effect of decreasing the representation of women.

== Legacy ==
A set of three stamps was issued in 1980 to mark the Mudra Afrique Arts Festival in which musicians, drummers and dancers performed.
