= Damien Boisseau =

French actor and voice-over artist

Damien Boisseau is a French actor who specializes in dubbing. He is the official voice-over artist of Matt Damon, Edward Norton, James Marsden, Casper Van Dien and Patrick Dempsey, and also a recurring voice of Josh Hartnett or Jared Padalecki. He started his career as a television and film actor in France, first appearing in a 1978 episode of Les Cinq Dernières Minutes.

== Voice roles ==
=== Live action ===
- The Butterfly Effect (Evan Trehorn (Ashton Kutcher))
- Charlie and the Chocolate Factory (Willy Wonka (Johnny Depp))
- Enchanted (Robert (Patrick Dempsey))
- The Hitcher (Jim Halsey (Zachary Knighton))
- Ocean's Eleven (Linus Caldwell (Matt Damon))
- The Texas Chainsaw Massacre (Kemper (Eric Balfour))
- X-Men film series (Cyclops (James Marsden))
- Miracle at Midnight (Henrik Koster (Justin Whalin))
- Cinderella (Prince Christopher (Paolo Montalban))
- Radio Days (Joe (Seth Green))

=== DTV ===
- Cinderella III: A Twist in Time (Prince Charming (Christopher Daniel Barnes))
- Mune: Guardian of the Moon (2014)

=== Animated ===
- Samurai Jack (Jack Phil LaMarr)

=== Video games ===
- Jak and Daxter (Jak (Mike Erwin))
- Red Faction (Parker (Dale Inghram))
- The Legend of Spyro: A New Beginning (Kane (Phil LaMarr))
