= Tessa Noël =

Fictional character in Highlander

- Highlander character
- First appearance: "The Gathering"
- Portrayed by: Alexandra Vandernoot

In-universe information
- Born: August 24, 1958
- Profession: Antique dealer, professional sculptor, professional illustrator

Tessa Noël is a fictional character in the television series Highlander: The Series, portrayed by Belgian actor Alexandra Vandernoot. A professional artist and sculptor, Tessa is the lover and confidant of the series protagonist Duncan MacLeod, played by Adrian Paul, an immortal swordsman born centuries before in the Scottish Highlands. In the pilot episode "The Gathering," Tessa is said to have been in a relationship with Duncan for twelve years already and the two co-own MacLeod and Noël Antiques in the fictional city Seacouver, Washington. Alongside Duncan, she is a mentor and friend to young Richie Ryan.

Highlander: The Series ran for six season from 1992-1998. A series regular, Vandernoot appeared in all season 1 episodes and the first four episodes of season 2. She then left the show in order to have more time for her family and other projects, not wishing to continue working with the show's heavy production schedule and obligations. She returned for guest appearances in the season two finale "Counterfeit" and the two-part series finale episodes "To Be" and "Not to Be" in 1998.

The character of Tessa was popular with fans who praised her character's outspoken personality and her relationship with Duncan MacLeod. Her departure was criticized and protested by several. The series producers have noted in different interviews that the show became more cynical following Tessa's departure.

== Fictional biography ==
Tessa Noël is born on August 28, 1958, in Lille, France. When she is seven years old, she falls in love for the first time with then-nineteen-year-old Alan Rothwood (Anthony Head) and is "heart-broken" when he completes his studies and leaves the country. Tessa then studies at the Sorbonne in Paris, France. Skilled at illustration and sculpture (using either metal or modelling clay), Tessa begins working as an artist while also having a day job as a tour guide for the River Seine in Paris.

On April 1, 1980, while escaping an enemy, the immortal Duncan MacLeod leaps off a bridge and lands on a Bateau Mouche boat where Tessa is conducting a tour. Despite the interruption, Tessa finds Duncan charming and allows him to remain with the tour. The two meet afterward and begin dating. On the three year anniversary of when they first met, MacLeod reveals to Tessa that he was born in 1592 and, like a rare number of other humans, was born with an energy called the Quickening that made him ageless once he'd suffered a premature violent death (his First Death). Since then, he can only die if he is beheaded. MacLeod reveals this so Tessa can decide if she wants to continue their relationship. To his relief, she expresses compassion and empathy for the loneliness immortality must bring and is glad to now know the truth. "I was just thinking how lonely you must be. Your parents, your friends... having them all die."

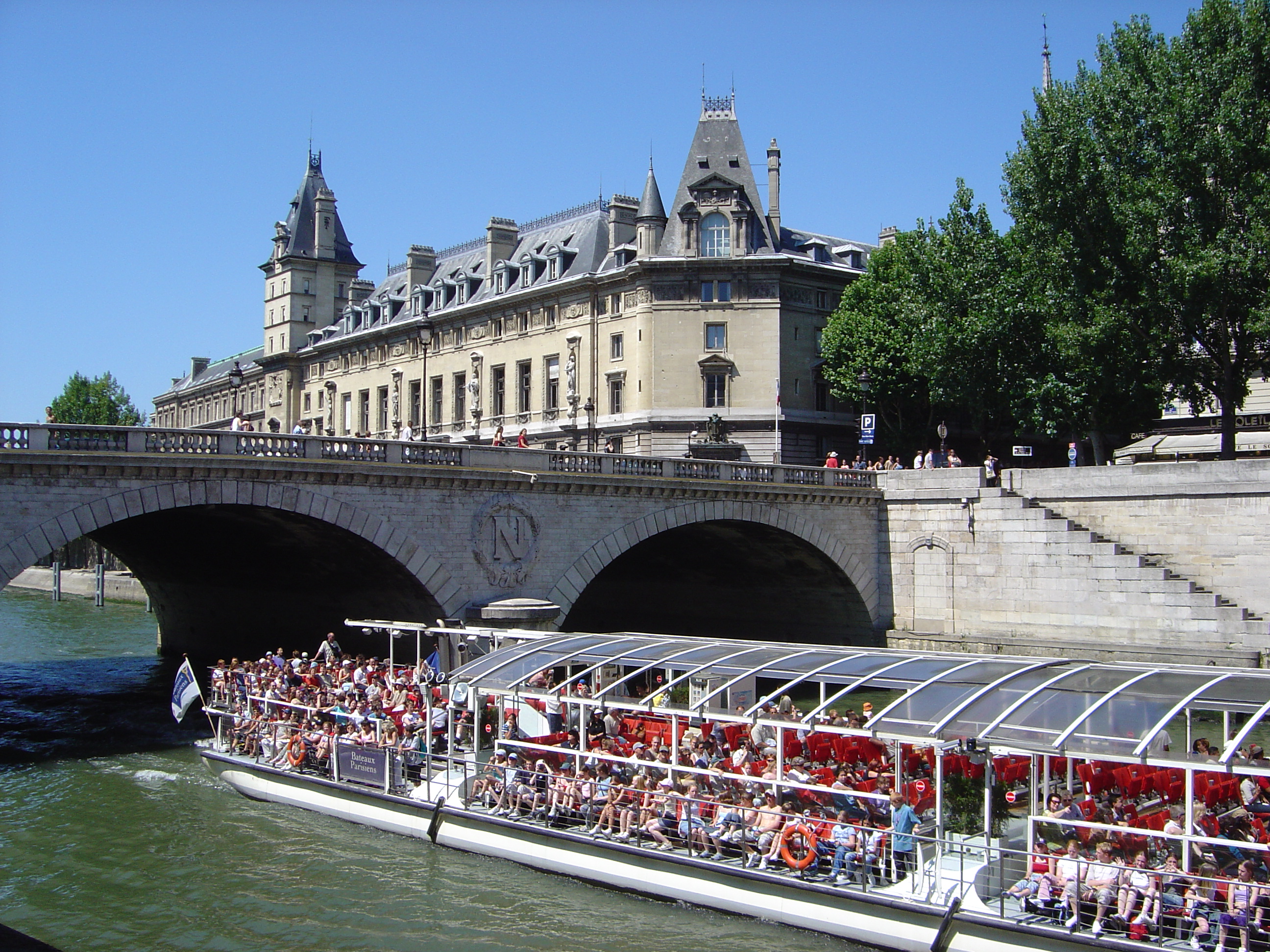
A flashback in "For Evil's Sake" shows Tessa working on a Bateau Mouche like this one in Paris.

The two continue dating, though Tessa later openly worries that Duncan's immortality will one day separate them, either because he'll want someone younger or because she'll decide she wants someone who can grow older with her. As an immortal, MacLeod is sterile and Tessa resigns herself to having no children. In the episode "The Sea Witch," Tessa becomes very fond of a four-year-old girl and muses, "For a while there, just for a few hours... I felt like she was mine. I liked how it felt. But, she's not... I have my own life and it's more than enough." At one point, Tessa tells Duncan, "I know the risks I choose to take... I stay with you because I want to. I won't run. I'm not the little woman and I'll never be barefoot and pregnant. We all have things to face. This is mine."

Duncan does not tell Tessa that an immortal may take the power and knowledge of another immortal they kill. For this reason, many hunt each other in the Game, believing "in the end, there can be only one" and that the last survivor will have the power of all immortals who ever lived. During their time together, Duncan occasionally defends himself from other immortals and kills them without Tessa knowing. Eventually, the two open the antique shop MacLeod and Noël Antiques in Seacouver, Washington. Their apartment is attached to the property and Tessa also maintains a studio there where she continues to create and sell art.

In 1992, the immortal Slan Quince (Richard Moll) comes to the shop to challenge Duncan to a duel. He is immediately followed by Connor MacLeod (Christopher Lambert). After Slan flees to continue the battle another time, Duncan explains that Connor is from his clan and also immortal, born almost 90 years earlier. When Connor learned that another member of the Clan MacLeod had recovered from death, he found Duncan, taught him about immortals, and trained him in how to survive. Tessa then learns about the Game and that Duncan will repeatedly have to battle for his life against those immortals who desire more power. The two discuss what this means for their relationship but Tessa decides to stay with Duncan. During this time, the two of them meet 17-year-old petty thief Richie Ryan (Stan Kirsch), who learns from witnessing the MacLeods fight and behead Quince that they are immortals. Wanting to watch over the young man and believing he is not an inherent criminal but simply someone who needs guidance, Duncan and Tessa hire Richie to work in their shop, forging a friendship.

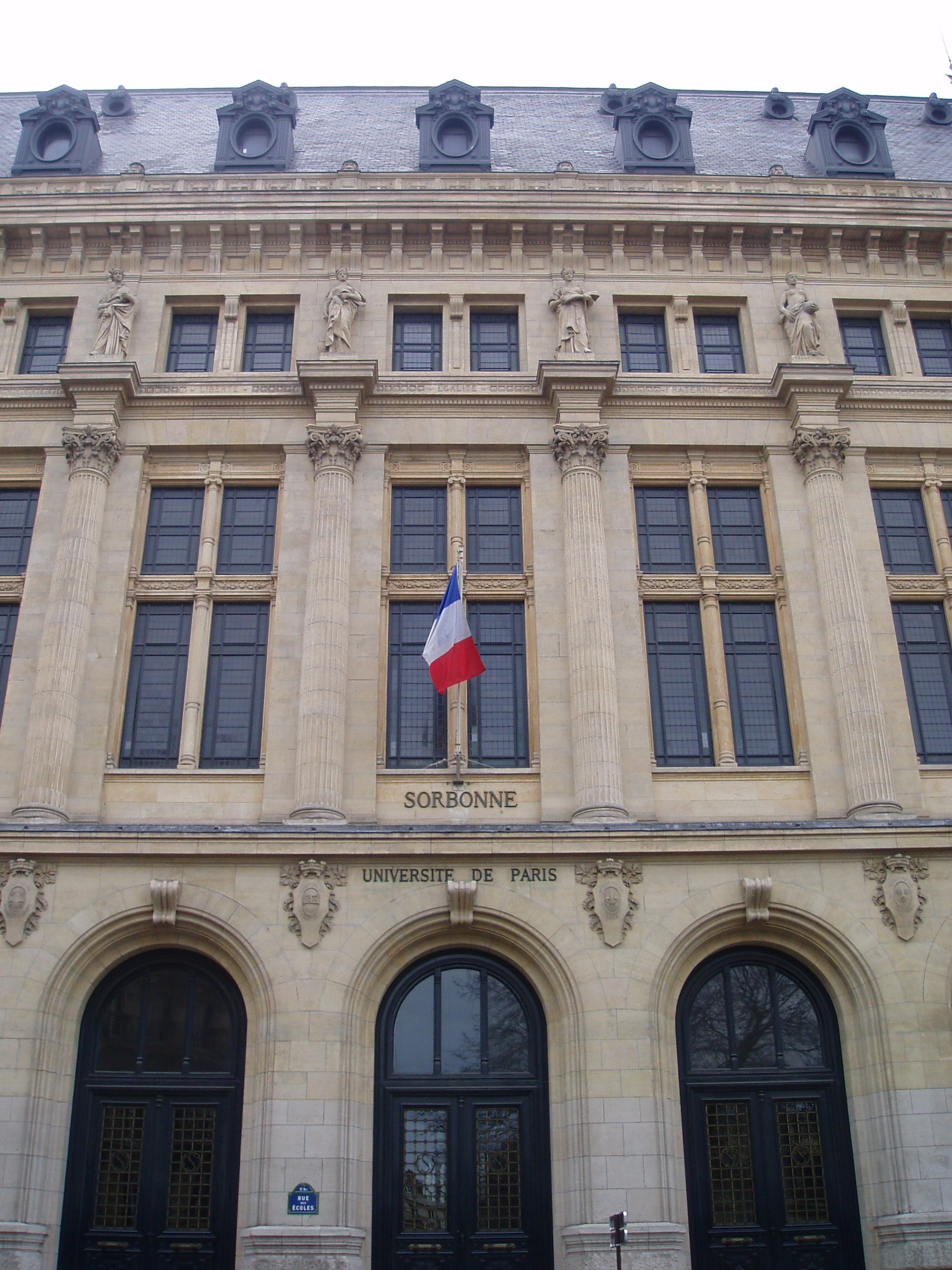
"See No Evil" indicates Tessa was educated at the Sorbonne in Paris

Now understanding how violent Duncan's world is, Tessa is an aid and confidant to his adventures. At times, she helps ground him. "You may be immortal, but you're not omnipotent... The world is not your responsibility." Hating violence and war, Tessa reluctantly concludes that it is now part of her life and sometimes all that will stop certain types of evil. At the same time, she takes no joy or satisfaction in the deaths of evil immortals or killers. To stop a serial killer, she strikes the man with her car, injuring him. Despite his crimes, Tessa asks for an ambulance rather than allow the man to suffer or die, and later feels guilty for her action, remarking, "I thought ridding the world of evil would feel better than this." During all this, she continues to pursue her own career and is hired for high-profile projects.

When Tessa witnesses the brutal murder of former artist Anne Wheeler, she becomes enraged when the police seem unwilling to do something and decides to investigate on her own. During the investigation, MacLeod tells Tessa she is stronger than Anne and would be fine if he were to die. Tessa responds, "You only think so because it suits you." The two eventually avenge Anne's death when the killer is revealed to be an immortal.

Later on, Tessa is offered the position of curator of a traveling exhibition based in Paris, France. She decides to leave Seacouver, telling Duncan, "Remember. Paris is our city. I'll be waiting for you." After battling another immortal, Duncan and Richie join Tessa in Paris. The three live on a barge MacLeod owns on the Seine near Notre Dame. While in Paris, Tessa meets Amanda (Elizabeth Gracen), an immortal thief and former lover of Duncan's. Despite their tension and clashing views of life, the two women come to respect each other. In another case, Tessa pushes aside her jealousy of a former love of Duncan's when an ex-girlfriend named Grace needs his help. Once Duncan assures her he has no feelings still for Grace, Tessa remarks, "that's all that need to be said. She's your friend and she's been hurt. You'll help her. I'd expect you to do no less."

MacLeod encounters Alfred Cahill (Martin Kemp), an immortal who recently discovered his true nature. Already suffering from mental illness, Cahill now believes he is an angel meant to free the world from sin. While MacLeod believes the only way to stop Cahill is to behead him, Tessa's argues, "Enlightened societies don't kill their insane. They treat them." Cahill crosses paths with Tessa's childhood friend Elaine Trent (Sandra Nelson), who has become a prostitute since they last saw each other. Shocked at first, believing that Elaine threw away her potential, Tessa decides this is too harsh and she should not judge her friend. The two talk and reach a new understanding. Cahill later confronts Tessa, who sees how delusional he is when he insists he is the reincarnation of a Knight Templar. Seeing no other way to protest others from his delusion, MacLeod duels and kills Cahill. Elaine then leaves Paris without saying goodbye to Tessa, hoping to completely start her life over.

While still in Paris, the immortal Darius, an old friend of Duncan's, is murdered by mortals. Darius's belongings lead Duncan to learn that there is a secret organization called the Watchers who study and record the lives of immortals. A sub-group calling themselves Hunters now executes immortals so none will win the Game and gain enough power to rule humanity. After Duncan saves his friend Hugh Fitzcairn from the Hunters, he returns to Seacouver with Tessa and Richie. Soon afterward, Duncan meets the Watcher Joe Dawson who explains the rest of his organization is benevolent and sworn to not interfere with the lives of immortals or their loved ones.

Weeks later, Richie meets a fortune teller named Greta (Traci Lords) who then experiences a psychic vision when she meets Tessa. She urges her to flee the city but Tessa isn't sure how seriously to take her. MacLeod recalls another fortune teller in 1848 who predicted he would love and bury many women, but marry none. Worried he may not have a chance later or may lose her first, MacLeod then asks Tessa to marry him and she agrees. The next day, Tessa is abducted by a Hunter named Pallin Wolf (Andrew Jackson) as bait for MacLeod. MacLeod finds them and kills Wolf, then sends Tessa home with Richie. On their way to the car, Tessa and Richie are mugged and shot dead by Marc Roszca, a drug addict wanting their money. As Tessa dies, Richie awakens, realizing what MacLeod had sensed since they first met: he is also immortal.

Duncan's grief leads him to sell the antique shop and purchase a martial arts gym, relocating to a new apartment. Haunted by Tessa's death, he also treasures the time they spent together, telling Richie, "She was part of our lives, Richie. Never pretend she wasn't." Later, Richie remarks to MacLeod, "You can't get past it, Mac. I know. You've seen a lot of people die. But you had to be the hero, you sent us out to the car that night, you could have been there... You look me in the eyes and you tell me you don't blame yourself for her death."

MacLeod continues to occasionally think of Tessa throughout the series, sometimes missing her and sometimes believing she would have had a better life and would still be alive if they had never met. He is forced to confront his guilt and grief regarding Tessa when he meets a woman sharing her appearance in the second season two-part finale "Counterfeit." In the two-part series finale episodes "To Be" and "Not To Be", MacLeod has a vision of a world in which he was never born. In this reality, Tessa has a husband and children but sacrificed creating art herself, believing it was just too difficult a career to pursue. Though she cares for her children, her marriage is empty and without passion, and she does not connect to her often-absent husband who sees no reason to encourage her art.

== Character development and reception ==
Executive producer William Panzer was intrigued by the idea that a mortal would want to spend their life with an immortal despite the drawbacks and possible dangers. Panzer said creating interesting female characters in the Highlander franchise was often a challenge because the producers found it difficult to "have the women be something other than a victim, a hostage, other things when dealing with an immortal hero."

In the script of "The Gathering," Tessa is described as "a beautiful, elegantly casual woman, artist, free spirit, and proprietor of the most unusual antique shop in the city." Because Highlander: The Series was an international co-production, the producers cast a French-speaking actor to play Tessa. Producer Gary Goodman explained that they wanted someone "that would be appealing on a television screen... in the sense that you were comfortable with her accent and her character." They chose Belgian actress Alexandra Vandernoot because she "was able to be exotic, pretty and not so unfamiliar to an American audience that she was accepted."

Vandernoot recalled, "I think I was quite close to Tessa. She was very well written, very easy to play and I wish I was like that. I'm not sure I'd like that but... it's very nice, you know, to play a character with nice feelings and nice emotions... very understanding, generous, supportive." Vandernoot got along with actors Adrian Paul (who played Duncan MacLeod) and Stan Kirsch (who played young Richie Ryan), but was not prepared for the long hours and months of filming a North American TV series, where a season includes often twice as many episodes or more as a European TV series. She adapted, later saying that filming the series was "exhausting but formative." A native French speaker, Vandernoot worked with a dialect coach to help her with English, which she found "challenging."

Vandernoot thought "the relationship between Tessa and MacLeod was very deep because very soon, he told her about himself... because he trusted her, and I think trust is a very good definition of their relationship. She trusted him entirely and he trusted her." Producer Barry Rosen said, "We were very lucky that [Vandernoot and Kirsch] were so human-grounded, so we could really play off of them and the way they looked at things that [Duncan MacLeod] went through. They were also able to get into real-life situations, romances, getting in trouble, jealousies and so on." In the show, Tessa is in her mid 30s while Richie is just shy of his 18th birthday when they meet, leading to a relationship not unlike an older sister and younger brother. On set, Vandernoot was only three years older than Kirsh, but still jokingly treated him as a beloved younger brother because of his youthful appearance.

Vandernoot and Paul created a strong on-screen relationship between their characters. David Abramowitz, creative consultant starting in the second season and later an executive producer on the show, said, "When I saw her and Adrian together, I thought that if I died, and there was a Mount Olympus, that the two of them would be standing together with thunderbolts around them. They were god-like. They were so beautiful and had such presence."

Reviewer Rob Lineberger called Tessa "beautiful and spirited," and said "she is the perfect mortal foil for MacLeod's heavy concerns. She lightens and strengthens him." He added, "Together, they are a model couple. They have healthy banter, intense arguments, plenty of romance, and an easy comfort with each other." Reviewer Abbie Bernstein of the Audio Video Revolution website wrote that Tessa was "depicted not as a screechy, in-the-dark Lois Lane but rather as a woman who handles her lover's supernatural aspects with remarkable pragmatism." Berstein added Tessa was "an unusually gutsy love interest (not to mention a refreshing sexually active heroine, as opposed to the coy 'sexual tension'-generating females who usually populate the genre)." Reviewer Gord Lacey of TVShowsOnDVD.com "found her rather annoying." Reviewer Doug Anderson of The Sydney Morning Herald wrote that Tessa was "too arty and sympathetic to serve any purpose other than an emotional spur for the hero's vengeance." Joanne Ostrow of The Denver Post wrote that "Paul and Vandernoot don't look like typical American TV-style bimbos and hunks, and for good reason. They were cast to appeal internationally."

In 1993, Vandernoot wanted to leave the show because shooting Highlander was too demanding on her time, requiring her to spend several months each year in Canada when she wanted to spend more time with her family. According to Abramowitz, another reason was that "[Vandernoot] being a really strong actress wanted to play a more aggressive part in the show and sadly, the nature of the beast was that it couldn't happen [with Tessa] and she made a decision."

The creative staff felt ways Tessa could be written out of the show were restricted because of the character's strong relationship with MacLeod. Associate Creative Consultant Gillian Horvath said, "There was no way... to have a scene where she said, 'Okay, I'm going to go to Paris without you. Nice knowing you, MacLeod.'" The writers decided that the only solution was for Tessa to die, despite Abramowitz's feeling that her death was "heartbreaking."

Tessa's death occurred in the fourth episode of the second season, "The Darkness." To surprise audiences and not make the death seem formulaic, the creative staff decided Tessa would die in a random mugging incident rather than be murdered by an enemy of MacLeod's or as part of the episode's main storyline. Horvath said "losing a loved one to a random act of violence is something that happens totally unexpectedly, at a moment that makes no sense dramatically". As originally written, Tessa's death scene shows MacLeod kneeling beside her and cradling her. Richie then revives from his fatal wounds and speaks with MacLeod. During the filming of the episode, no dialog was recorded and the final broadcast version shown in North America did not show Richie revive. The European version showed Richie reviving, but not that he speaks to MacLeod. For the season finale "Counterfeit Part Two," this scene reshot in Paris, this time including the dialog. However, this footage was not seen in the final broadcast version. The footage was eventually used in the season four episode "Leader of the Pack," when Richie finds Tessa's killer.

Lineberger wrote that "I was taken aback by the dark tone and emotional range generated by this episode. Highlander is a fantasy series, yet I cared about the characters as though I know them... Vandernoot gave Tessa such vitality and charm that her death left me reeling." Abramowitz said that Tessa's death strongly angered many viewers and "people hated me for killing her." There was further audience anger and criticism when in the episode immediately following, "Eye For An Eye," MacLeod spends the night with an old lover, the immortal Annie Devlin. Abramowitz justified the scene saying "someone once told me that death was an aphrodisiac. It's a thing that pushes you to life and the greatest thing in life, that's 'seize life', is sex." In his review of "Eye For An Eye," Lineberger wrote "This one caused an uproar— one I feel is justified... When Duncan rolled into Annie's arms, part of me smirked in appreciation of Duncan's magnetic charm. But the rest of me found his actions cruel to the viewers." Adrian Paul also reported an angry reaction from the audience when the seventh episode of season two, "The Return of Amanda," depicts MacLeod sleeping with Amanda less than a month after Tessa's death.

Tessa's death was seen by fans as a turning point in Highlander: The Series. It marked the first time that a regular character died in the show and would be followed by others. Horvath recalled that "it changed the tone of the show. It made Highlander the show where you couldn't be positive that the characters were safe because they were in the credits." Tessa's death also gave the show a pessimistic tone that influenced the remaining characters. Lineberger said, "Richie and Duncan relate to each other differently from now on, and Duncan is bereft of much of his joy [and] moodier as well. Tessa is no longer around to lighten him."

Tessa remained extremely popular with the audience after her death, prompting the producers to develop the season two finale episode "Counterfeit" to bring her back in some way, at least temporarily. According to actor Stan Kirsch, Vandernoot did not realize her, or her character's, popularity before attending conventions. Adrian Paul said Vandernoot was surprised her character had so much influence on the show.

In the two-part finale to series two, "Counterfeit" (1994), Vandernoot returned as the character Lisa Halle, a woman who undergoes plastic surgery and vocal training so she can resemble Tessa in voice and appearance. Pretending to be Lisa Millon, a French artist with a striking resemblance to Tessa, she lures MacLeod into a false sense of security so his enemies can attack him when he's vulnerable. While playing Lisa, Vandernoot sometimes spoke with the character's "real" voice rather than the voice the villain used to imitate Tessa. This was achieved using automated dialogue replacement during post-production, with actress Meilani Paul (Adrian Paul's reallife wife from 1990 to 1997) providing Lisa's true voice and portrayed the character before surgery.

Fans and critics enjoyed Vandernoot's return and she enjoyed playing a different type of character. Adrian Paul said Lisa Halle was fun for Vandernoot "to play a different character which was similar to Tessa but also had an evil intent to her."

Reviewing "Counterfeit", David M. Gutierrez of DVDVerdict.com wrote that "despite the fact that the having an exact twin of Tessa's pop up is flatly ludicrous, it plays out due to MacLeod's desire to have Tessa back overriding his sense of reason... [Vandernoot] looks like she enjoys playing the good/bad Lisa. Her triple performance as Tessa shows Vandernoot's range." Kathie Huddleston of SciFi.com said "a visit from Tessa in 'Counterfeit,' even an evil Tessa look-alike, is a welcome nod to a significant character from the first season, and it gave our boy Duncan a moment or two to reflect on his recent lost love."
