= Fabrice Josso =

French actor (born 1967)

- Born: 11 February 1967 (age 59); France
- Occupation: Actor
- Years active: 1976–present
- Website: www.fabricejosso.com

Fabrice Josso (born 11 February 1967) is a French actor who specializes in the dubbing industry.

He is known for his roles in Sans Famille, Exploits of a Young Don Juan (1986), and Mune: Guardian of the Moon (2014).

== Filmography ==
=== Live-action ===
- 1985: À nous les garçons
- 1986: Exploits of a Young Don Juan – Roger
- 1987: Les nouveaux tricheurs – Karl
- 1988: Corps z'a corps – Albin, le fils de M. de Villecresne
- 1990: Flight from Paradise – Téo

=== Animation ===
- 2000: Carnivale – Enzo
- 2005: Final Fantasy VII: Advent Children – Zack Fair
- 2006–2007 : Squirrel Boy – Polar Bear
- 2007–2013 : Oscar's Oasis – Wig
- 2008–2010 : The Marvelous Misadventures of Flapjack – Eight-Armed Willy
- 2009–2012 : Hot Wheels: Battle Force 5 – Shy Diad (voice and sound effects)
- 2014 : Mune: Guardian of the Moon – Spleen

=== Dubbing ===
- Billy Crudup
  - Waking the Dead (2000) – Fielding Pierce
  - Stage Beauty (2004) – Ned Kynaston
  - Mission: Impossible III (2006) – John Musgrave
  - Watchmen (2009) – Jon Osterman / Dr. Manhattan
  - Too Big to Fail (2011) – Timothy Geithner
  - Alien: Covenant (2017) – Chris Oram
  - Justice League (2017) – Henry Allen
  - Gypsy (2017) – Michael Holloway
- Jensen Ackles
  - Dark Angel (2001–2002) – Alec McDowell / X5-494
  - Dawson's Creek (2002–2003) – C.J. Braxton
  - Smallville (2004–2005) – Jason Teague
  - Supernatural (2005–present) – Dean Winchester
  - Devour (2005) – Jake Gray
  - My Bloody Valentine 3D (2009) – Tom Hanniger
- Johnny Galecki
  - Happy Endings (2005) – Miles
  - Hope & Faith (2005–2006) – Jay
  - The Big Bang Theory (2007–2019) – Leonard Hofstadter
  - In Time (2011) – Borel
  - Entourage (2011) – Johnny Galecki
