= Flight from Paradise =

1990 film

- Directed by: Ettore Pasculli
- Written by: Ettore Pasculli; Lucio Mandarà
- Produced by: Luciano Luna; Claudia Mori; Pupi Sambati
- Starring: Fabrice Josso; Inés Sastre; Horst Buchholz
- Cinematography: Alfio Contini
- Edited by: Ruggero Mastroianni
- Music by: Michel Legrand
- Release date: 1990

Flight from Paradise (Italian: Fuga dal paradiso, French: La Fuite au paradis, Spanish: La fuga del paraíso, German: Ausbruch aus dem Paradies) is a 1990 post-apocalyptic science fiction film co-written and directed by Ettore Pasculli. It premiered at the 47th Venice International Film Festival.

== Cast ==
- Fabrice Josso as Téo
- Inés Sastre as Béatrice
- Horst Buchholz as Thor
- Aurore Clément as Sarah
- Jacques Perrin as Élisée
- Van Johnson as the Old Narrator
- Paolo Bonacelli as Eliah
- Lou Castel as Oleg
- Daniela Giordano as Gius
- Giovanni Visentin as Alex
- Lukas Ammann as Mait
- Barbara Cupisti as the Assassin
- Greta Vaillant

== Production ==
A co-production between Italy, France, Spain, and Germany, the film was shot at Cinecittà during the summer of 1989, with a budget of about 6 billion lire.

== Release ==
The film premiered at the 47th edition of the Venice Film Festival, in the Fuoridiprogramma sidebar.

== Reception ==
A contemporary Variety review described the film as "a bizarre, incoherent sci-fi yarn", pointing out that "what remains unclear is what audience it could be destined for. At first glance a film for kids", it "has many scenes of ugly violence seemingly geared to adult viewers". Corriere della Sera's film critic Maurizio Porro noted that despite "a few seductive images" the film was "an expensive confusion".
