= Les Exploits d'un jeune Don Juan =

1986 film by Gianfranco Mingozzi

- French film poster
- Directed by: Gianfranco Mingozzi
- Written by: Jean-Claude Carrière; Peter Fleischmann; Gianfranco Mingozzi
- Starring: Serena Grandi; Claudine Auger; Marina Vlady; Fabrice Josso
- Cinematography: Luigi Verga
- Edited by: Alfredo Muschietti
- Music by: Nicola Piovani
- Release dates: November 11, 1986 (Turin, Italy); March 11, 1987 (France)
- Running time: 100 minutes
- Countries: France; Italy
- Language: French
- Box office: $1.3 million

Les Exploits d'un jeune Don Juan (lit. 'Exploits of a Young Don Juan', Italian: L'iniziazione, lit. 'The Initiation', is a 1986 erotic film written and directed by Gianfranco Mingozzi.

It is loosely based on the novel Les Exploits d'un jeune Don Juan by Guillaume Apollinaire. The film was shot in France.

== Plot ==
In 1914, Roger, a 17-year old boy, returns home from boarding school for summer vacation after being gone three years. Waiting there at his family's villa are his mother, his nine-year old sister Berthe, his spinster aunt Marguerite, his father's friend Mr. Frank, maids Ursula and Helene, and Berthe's nanny Kate. Roger hangs out with Berthe, who becomes his confidante. Mr. Frank tries to court Marguerite. Roger witnesses Ursula and Helene having sex with other men. He is sexually frustrated with all the women in the house. Soon, his father, his 20-year old sister Elisa, and Elisa's fiancé Roland join them. Roger overhears Marguerite confess her feelings for him at church. After he is discovered eavesdropping, he is given lashes as punishment. He learns more about sex, but the adults do not take him seriously.

Germany declares war with France, and most of the men leave to fight in World War I. Roger helps Ursula carry a mattress and tries to initiate sex. She consents, and he loses his virginity to her. Roger finds Kate alone outside and has sex with her. He visits Marguerite in her room, and she performs fellatio. Roger has sex with Helene. He follows Elisa to the stables and takes her virginity. Roger has a threesome with Ursula and Helene. He then has a foursome with Ursula, Kate, and Marguerite, and takes Marguerite's virginity. Several men return home from the war. Elisa, Ursula, and Marguerite each tell Roger that they are pregnant with his child. Roger convinces Elisa to have sex with Roland, and he convinces Marguerite to have sex with Mr. Frank. In a triple wedding, Ursula, Elisa, and Marguerite marry their respective partners. Helene tells Roger she is pregnant but says she does not have to get married. After saying goodbye to everyone, Roger leaves for the city.

== Cast ==
- Serena Grandi as Ursula
- Claudine Auger as The Mother
- Marina Vlady as Mrs. Muller
- Fabrice Josso as Roger
- François Perrot as The Father
- Aurélien Recoing as Adolphe
- Rosette as Helene
- Laurent Spielvogel as Mr. Frank
- Alexandra Vandernoot as Elisa
- Marion Peterson as Kate
- Yves Lambrecht as Roland
- Rufus as The Monk
- Berangere Bonvoisin as Aunt Marguerite
- Virginie Ledoyen as Berthe

== Release ==
The film was released as L'iniziazione in Turin, Italy on November 11, 1986. It was released in France as Les Exploits d'un jeune Don Juan on March 11, 1987.
