= Giuseppe Mussardo =

Italian theoretical physicist

- Giuseppe Mussardo in 2025
- Education: University of Pisa (MSC); SISSA (PHD)
- Scientific career
- Fields: Theoretical physics
- Workplaces: SISSA
- Website: people.sissa.it/~mussardo/

Giuseppe Mussardo is an Italian theoretical physicist, a full professor at the International School for Advanced Studies (SISSA) in Trieste, and a member of the Accademia delle Arti del Disegno in Florence. His work concerns quantum field theory, statistical mechanics and number theory.

His contributions include the LeClair–Mussardo formula and calculations that enabled quantitative comparisons between integrable field theory and quasi-one-dimensional magnetic systems. He is also involved in publishing and science communication, particularly in the history of science.

== Research ==
=== Theoretical physics ===
Mussardo has contributed to the development of low-dimensional integrable quantum field theories, in which spectra, scattering processes and correlation functions can be determined using exact methods. With John Cardy, he constructed the S-matrix of the Yang–Lee edge singularity. He analysed the S-matrices of affine Toda field theories and the integrable deformation of the tricritical Ising model, whose spectrum is organised according to the exceptional Lie algebra E₇.

His research has also focused on the analytical calculation of form factors, which allow correlation functions to be calculated from knowledge of the Hamiltonian spectrum and the S-matrix. For the sinh-Gordon model, he contributed to the derivation of closed-form expressions for an entire class of local operators. In this area, he also studied the convergence of spectral series, showing how a small number of intermediate states can provide accurate approximations to correlation functions.

He contributed to the calculation of the spin–spin correlation function of the two-dimensional Ising model at its critical temperature in a magnetic field, a theory connected with the exceptional Lie algebra E₈. These results provided quantitative predictions for particle masses and spectral intensities. In 2021, an experimental study of the quasi-one-dimensional compound BaCo₂V₂O₈ observed all eight single-particle excitations of the E₈ spectrum, together with numerous multiparticle contributions; the measured peak positions and intensities showed quantitative agreement with predictions obtained using form factors.

With André LeClair, he introduced the LeClair–Mussardo formula for calculating local observables at finite temperature in integrable field theories.

=== Number theory ===
His scientific work has also explored connections between quantum physics and number theory. With André LeClair, he developed a probabilistic approach to the generalized Riemann hypothesis, relating the statistical behaviour of sums involving prime numbers and Dirichlet characters to Brownian-type processes and the convergence of Euler products. He also proposed integrable quantum models whose quantisation conditions reproduce the non-trivial zeros of the Riemann zeta function and Dirichlet L-functions on the critical line. He has also contributed to representing sequences of prime numbers through quantum potentials and studied possible spectral signatures of integer factorization.

== Academic career ==
Mussardo graduated in physics from the University of Pisa in 1983 and received his PhD from SISSA in 1988. After postdoctoral appointments in Santa Barbara and Copenhagen, he joined SISSA in 1991. He taught at the University of Insubria from 1997 to 1999 and became a full professor at SISSA in 2000.

He served as SISSA’s deputy director from 2001 to 2004 and founded its Statistical Physics Group and PhD programme in 2005. He chaired the European programmes INSTANS and QICFT and held the Kramers Chair at Utrecht University in 2017–2018.

== Scientific textbooks and editorial work ==
Mussardo’s expository work has helped disseminate integrable field theory through his 1992 Physics Reports review. Statistical Field Theory: An Introduction to Exactly Solved Models in Statistical Physics (Oxford University Press, 2010; expanded second edition, 2020) brings together critical phenomena, conformal field theory and integrable models. It serves as a reference text in university teaching, introducing advanced students to exact scattering, thermodynamic Bethe ansatz and form-factor methods. His The Exact S-Matrix: Symmetry, Particles and Integrability appeared in 2026.

His editorial activities include directing Castelvecchi’s QBit series, which publishes original works, translations and classics on science and the history of physics. He has also served on the Board of Directors of the Journal of Statistical Mechanics: Theory and Experiment.

== History of science and public engagement ==
His books on the history of science include The ABC’s of Science (Springer, 2020), Maksimovič, a biography of Bruno Pontecorvo whose Italian edition won the 2024 Cosmos Prize, and God Plays Dice with the World: The History of Quantum Mechanics (Italian edition, 2025; English edition, Springer, 2026). These works explore scientific discoveries through the lives of their protagonists and their historical setting.

He also writes and produces historical documentaries. The Italian Physical Society awarded him its 2013 Outreach Prize, particularly for his films on Ludwig Boltzmann, Subrahmanyan Chandrasekhar and Abdus Salam. His graphic novel on quantum mechanics, created with Luca Morici, received the 2026 Cosmos Students Award. He was elected to Florence’s Academy of the Arts of Drawing in 2022.
