= Alexandra Vandernoot =

Belgian actress (born 1965)

- Born: 19 September 1965 (age 60); Uccle, Belgium
- Education: Royal Conservatory of Brussels
- Occupation: Actress
- Years active: 1985–present
- Height: 5 ft 10 in (178 cm)
- Parents: André Vandernoot (father); Dušanka Sifnios (mother)

Alexandra Vandernoot (born 19 September 1965) is a Belgian film and television actress.

== Early life and education ==
Born in Brussels, Vandernoot is the daughter of Yugoslavia-born ballerina Dušanka Sifnios and Belgian conductor André Vandernoot.

She studied drama at the Royal Conservatory of Brussels.

== Career ==
Film She appeared in the sex comedy Exploits of a Young Don Juan (1986), and starred in a number of French films. Vandernoot had a small part in the 1994 film Pret-a-Porter. She appeared in the box office hit The Dinner Game (1998) and The Closet (2001).

Television In 1992, Vandernoot guest-starred on the Canadian series Counterstrike as femme fatale Noelle, accused of murder and jewel theft.

Vandernoot is perhaps best known internationally as Tessa Noël, the girlfriend of Duncan MacLeod in the 1990s action-fantasy Highlander: The Series. Introduced in the series premiere, Tessa appeared through the fourth episode of season two, "The Darkness," in which she was killed off. Vandernoot returned in the season two finale, "Counterfeit Part Two," as a woman made up to look like Tessa, and also in the series finale as Tessa Noël.

In 2007, Vandernoot played an engineer in Ondes de choc, a mini-series produced by the French public channel France 3 retracing an accident at a chemical factory comparable to the AZF factory disaster. In 2008, Vandernoot appeared in the television movie Un vrai Papa Noël.

== Personal life ==
With French director Bernard Uzan, Vandernoot has a son who was born in 1995 and a daughter who was born in 2003.

== Filmography ==
=== Film ===
- 1986: Exploits of a Young Don Juan – Elisa
- 1991: The Professional Secrets of Dr. Apfelgluck – The Belgian
- 1992: The Supper – Duchess of Dino
- 1994: Prêt-à-Porter – Sandra de la Notte
- 1998: The Dinner Game – Christine Brochant
- 2001: The Closet – Christine
- 2006: The Crown Prince – Helene Vetsera

=== Television ===
ACTOR television credits
| Year | Title | Role | Notes | Ref. |
|---|---|---|---|---|
| 1991 | Maigret | Anna Peeters | 1 episode | |
| 1992 | Counterstrike | Noelle | Episode: "Cherchez la Femme" | |
| 1992–1998 | Highlander: The Series | Tessa Noël | 31 episodes | |
| 2010 | Josephine, Guardian Angel | Sharon | 1 episode | |
