= Queen Elisabeth Hall =

Building in Antwerp

Coordinates: 51.2181°N 4.4223°E

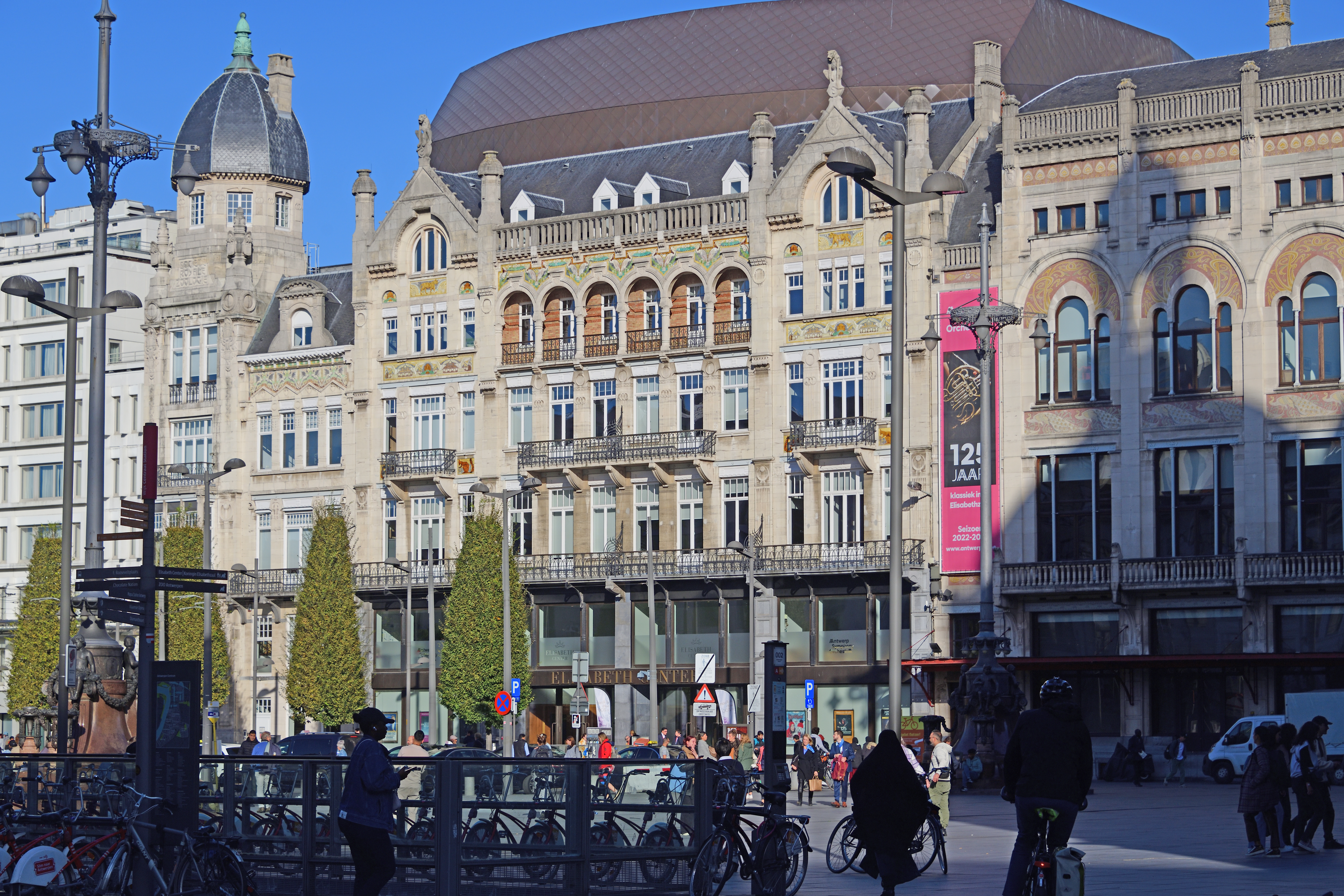
front of the building

The Queen Elisabeth Hall (in Dutch: "Koningin Elisabethzaal") is a concert and event venue located at the Koningin Astridplein in Antwerp, Belgium. It has a capacity of 2,000 seats and the Antwerp Symphony Orchestra is its residential orchestra. The Queen Elisabeth Hall is part of the Elisabeth Center of Antwerp, managed by the Royal Zoological Society of Antwerp (Koninklijke Maatschappij voor Dierkunde Antwerpen).

== History ==
=== Grote Feestzaal (1897–1947) ===
In 1897, the 'Grote Feestzaal’ was built on the site of the current Queen Elisabeth Hall to accommodate concerts organized by the Royal Zoological Society of Antwerp. The very first concert hall was built by Émile Thielens. It was part of the ‘Feestzalencomplex’ (Party Hall Complex) and was used for dance and symphonic concerts for the wealthy class bourgeoisie.

=== Queen Elisabeth Hall (1960–2011) ===
The complex was badly damaged during World War II and then burned down in 1947. In 1959, a new concert hall was built by Rie Haan with elements from Expo ‘58. In 1960, the new Queen Elisabeth Hall was opened by Queen Elisabeth.

=== Queen Elisabeth Hall (2016–present) ===
In 2011 a new Queen Elisabeth Hall was commissioned, the third concert hall on the same site. The design was a collaboration between SimpsonHaugh and Partners from Manchester, Kirkegaard Associates from Chicago, and the Bureau Bouwtechniek from Antwerp, and the project was financed by the Flemish Government with a budget of EUR 57.2 million. The new Queen Elisabeth Hall was opened by Queen Mathilde on November 25, 2016.

== Description ==
=== Acoustics ===
To optimize the acoustics, architects SimpsonHaugh collaborated with Kirkegaard Associates to develop a shoebox-shaped hall. In addition, the absence of a fixed apron stage minimized transmission loss. Reflectors (movable acoustic panels) suspended from the ceiling of the structure allow sound to fully project into the hall, and can be adjusted or removed as needed. The cavities between the oak panels on the sides and the concrete wall behind them are filled with lava sand to prevent vibration.

Kirkegaard Associates rated the sound quality of the new hall at 9.3 out of 10, compared to 6.0 before.

=== Multifunctionality ===
The Queen Elisabeth Hall is a multifunctional hall. There are good sightlines from every seat in the hall to the podium, and patrons can use the public areas before, during and after a performance. To reduce the turnaround time for productions, the stage floor consists of 12 movable sections and the fly loft above the stage holds lighting and scenery. Additionally, there are 70 chorus seats at the back of the stage for either the chorus or audience members, or they can be entirely removed to extend the depth of the stage.

=== Seating capacity ===
Depending on the layout (concert, congress, theatre), the Queen Elisabeth Hall can seat between 1,850 and 2,000.

=== Accessibility ===
The Queen Elisabeth Hall is located close to Antwerp Central Station, which has domestic and also international train links. In addition, the venue is located close to a number of bus, tram, and metro routes, and there are several car parks nearby. There is step-free access into the foyer from street level, with modern lifts connecting the foyer and auditorium.

== Performances ==
The Queen Elisabeth Hall is used for classical music performances, congresses, and sometimes pop stars.

The hall will be used as a venue for the 2021 World Choir Games, co-hosted by Antwerp and Ghent.

== Orchestra in residence: Antwerp Symphony Orchestra ==
The Antwerp Symphony Orchestra has been the orchestra of residence at the Queen Elisabeth Hall since the opening of the new hall in November 2016. The orchestra performs concerts under the baton of chief conductor Marc Albrecht, and honorary conductor Philippe Herreweghe, and also uses the hall for recordings.
