= Germán Sierra =

Spanish theoretical physicist, author, and academic

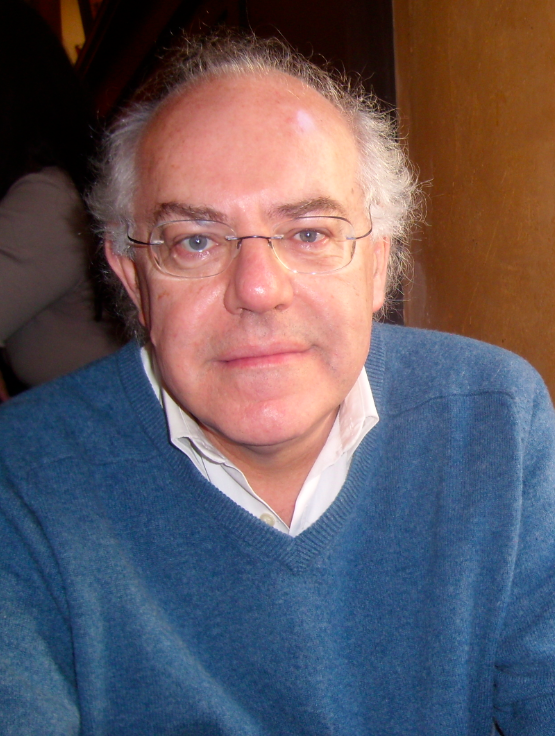
- Born: May 13, 1955 (age 71); Caracas (Venezuela)
- Occupations: theoretical physicist, author, and academic

Academic background
- Education: BS in Physics; PhD in Physics
- Alma mater: Complutense de Madrid, Spain
- Thesis: (1981)

Germán Sierra is a Spanish theoretical physicist, author, and academic. He is Professor of Research at the Institute of Theoretical Physics Autonomous University of Madrid-Spanish National Research Council.

Sierra's research interests span the field of physics and mathematical physics, focusing particularly on condensed matter physics, conformal field theory, exactly solved models, quantum information and computation and number theory. He has authored two books entitled, Quantum Groups in Two-dimensional Physics and Quantum electron liquids and high-Tc Superconductivity and also has published over 200 articles.

Sierra serves as an Editor of the Journal of Statistical Mechanics: Theory and Experiment, Journal of High Energy Physics and Nuclear Physics B.

== Education ==
Sierra earned his Baccalaureate degree in physics from the University of Complutense de Madrid in 1978, followed by a Ph.D. in physics from the same university in 1981. He then completed his Postdoc from the l'École Normale Supérieure in Paris in 1983.

== Career ==
Following his Postdoc, Sierra began his academic career as a Titular Professor at the University of Complutense de Madrid in 1984, a position he held for three years. In 1987 he was appointed as a research fellow at the European Council for Nuclear Research (CERN) in Geneva and as a Scientific Researcher at Spanish National Research Council in 1989. Since 2005, he has been serving as a Full Professor of Physics at the Spanish National Research Council in Spain. He has held visiting appointments at Erwin Schrödinger Institute, Kavli Institute for Theoretical Physics, Max Planck Institute for Quantum Optics, University of Sao Paulo, Princeton University, Isaac Newton Institute for Mathematical Sciences, Stony Brook University, and University of Innsbruck

From 2014 to 2017, he was a Member of the International Union of Pure and Applied Physics (IUPAP), Panel C18 on Mathematical Physics.

== Research ==
Sierra's research focuses on quantum physics with a particular emphasis on supergravity, quantum groups, quantum many body systems, integrable models. His research has contributed to the understanding of supergravity theories, conformal field theory, superconductivity spin chains and ladders, Richardson-Gaudin model, physical models of the Riemann Zeros, quantum Hall states, inhomogeneous spin chains, infinite matrix product states, The Prime State, quantum computation, and quantum games.

=== Supergravity ===
During his early research career, Sierra worked in the area of supergravity to construct and classify the N = 2 Maxwell-Einstein Supergravity theories (MESGT). His work involved an investigation of the algebraic and geometric structures underlying these theories, as well as their compact and non-compact gaugings. In collaboration with M. Gunaydin and P.K. Townsend, he derived the magic square of Freudenthal, Rozenfeld, and Tits by utilizing the geometric principles found in a specific group of N=2 Maxwell-Einstein supergravity theories.

=== Quantum groups ===
In 1990, Sierra's research diverted toward the construction, interpretation, and application of quantum groups in the context of conformal field theories, two-dimensional physics, and renormalization groups. He demonstrated that the representation theory of the q-deformation of SU(2) offers solutions to the polynomial equations formulated by Moore and Seiberg for rational conformal field theories, as long as q is a root of unity. Together with Cesar Gomez, he defined the representation spaces of the quantum group in terms of screened vertex operators and interpreted the number of screening operators as the genuine quantum group number. He introduced a spin chain Hamiltonian that possesses integrability and invariance under 14 (sI(2)) transformations within nilpotent irreducible representations when r3 = 1. Additionally, he proved that the elliptic R-matrix of the eight vertex free fermion model is the intertwiner R-matrix of a quantum deformed Clifford-Hopf algebra that the elliptic R-matrix of the eight-vertex free fermion model corresponds to the intertwiner R-matrix of a quantum deformed Clifford-Hopf algebra. In his work, he also presented a new mathematical structure entitled, graph quantum group which merges the tower of algebras associated with a graph G with the structure of a Hopf algebra {\cal A}. Furthermore, he explored spin-anisotropy commensurable chains, a class of 2D integrable models, and described their mathematics using quantum groups with the deformation parameter as an Nth root of unity. Moreover, alongside Miguel A. Martín-Delgado, he employed real space renormalization group (RG) methods to examine the interplay between two different variants of quantum groups, exploring their relationship.

=== Spin chains and ladders ===
In 1996, Sierra started working in condensed matter physics, more concretely on spin chains, spin ladders and high-Tc superconductors. He generalized Haldane's conjecture from spin chains to spin ladders using the O(3) non-linear sigma model. He also investigated phase transitions in staggered spin ladders and three-legged antiferromagnetic ladders. In addition, he applied the variational matrix product ansatz to determine the ground state of several ladder systems. In a joint study with J. Dukelsky, M.A. Martín-Delgado and T. Nishino, he showed that the latter method is equivalent to the DMRG method introduced by S. R. White in 1992. Working together with Martín-Delgado in 1998, he proposed an extension of the variational matrix product ansatzs to two dimensions. In 2004, F. Verstraete and J.I. Cirac rediscovered the latter ansatz using quantum information techniques, designating it as PEPS.

=== Richardson-Gaudin models ===
In 1999, Sierra in collaboration with J. Dukelsky applied the DMRG method to the pairing model that describes ultrasmall superconducting grains, confirming the exact solution of the pairing model obtained by Richardson and Sherman in 1963–64. Shortly after its application, a close relationship was revealed between Richardson's solution and another set of exactly solvable models called the Gaudin magnets, collectively known as Richardson-Gaudin models. Several subsequent applications involved studying the effect of level statistics in nanograins, the connection with conformal field theory and Chern-Simons theory, as well as exploring the implications with mean-field solutions and p-wave symmetry.

=== Russian doll renormalization group ===
In 2003–04, Sierra, in conjunction with A. LeClair and J.M. Román, introduced multiple models exhibiting a Russian doll renormalization group flow, featuring a cyclic nature instead of converging to a fixed point. Among them was a BCS model with pairing scattering phases that break time-reversal symmetry, which was later demonstrated to be solvable using the algebraic Bethe ansatz. Moreover, they put forward two scattering S-matrices exhibiting a cyclic renormalization group (RG) structure, which is related to both the cycle regime of the Kosterlitz-Thouless flow and an analytic extension of the massive sine-Gordon S matrix.

=== Physical models of the Riemann zeros ===
In 2005, Sierra presented a Russian doll model of superconductivity whose spectrum contains the average Riemann zeros as missing spectral lines, and this model is connected to the xp Hamiltonian of Berry, Keating, and Connes. In addition to proposing several variations of the xp model, he collaborated with C. E. Creffield to propose a different physical realization of the Riemann zeros using periodically driven cold atoms; this idea was eventually experimentally achieved in 2021 using trapped ions.

=== Entanglement in quantum hall states ===
In 2009, Sierra and I. D. Rodríguez evaluated the entanglement entropy for integer quantum Hall states, involving the computation of the entanglement spectrum, proposed by Li and Haldane to identify topological order in non-abelian quantum Hall states.

=== Entanglement in conformal field theory ===
Sierra computed with F. C. Alcaraz and M. Ibáñez the entanglement properties of the low-lying excitations in conformal field theory in 2011 and found several applications to condensed matter systems, holography, and systems with boundaries. Furthermore, he independently discovered with J. C. Xavier and F. C Alcaraz the property of "entanglement equipartition" in conformal systems with U(1) symmetry, where the entanglement entropy is equally distributed in different charge sectors and this finding holds for more general systems up to corrections, separate from the works.

=== Entanglement in inhomogeneous spin chains ===
In 2014, Sierra, along with J. Rodríguez-Laguna and G. Ramírez, introduced an inhomogeneous spin chain model called rainbow chain that exhibits a maximal violation of the area law of entanglement entropy, in stark contrast to the behavior observed in homogeneous chains. The rainbow chain model, earlier proposed by J. I. Latorre in a separate joint work, was examined using conformal field theory techniques and was found to support symmetry-protected phases.

=== Infinite matrix product states and conformal field theory ===
In 2010, Sierra proposed a variational ansatz for the ground state of the XXZ spin chain using the chiral vertex operators of a CFT to describe the critical region of this model, resulting in a matrix product state with an infinite bond dimension to capture logarithmic entanglement entropy. The ansatz also replicated the Haldane-Shastry wave function for the XXX spin chain, notably matching a conformal block of the WZW model SU(2) at level k=1, and was later extended to any level k jointly with A. E. B. Nielsen and J. Ignacio Cirac. In two spatial dimensions, the CFT wave function demonstrated a bosonic Laughlin spin liquid state on a lattice, that was experimentally realized using optical lattices. This method was extended to other bosonic and fermionic Laughlin states, WZW model SU(N)_1, etc. The CFT wave functions described earlier were derived as tensor network states where the individual tensors are functionals of fields which allowed the analysis of the symmetries of the field tensor network states.

=== The prime state ===
Along with J. I. Latorre, Sierra proposed a quantum circuit that creates a pure state corresponding to the quantum superposition of all prime numbers less than 2^n, where n is the number of qubits of the register. They showed the construction of the Prime state using the Gover algorithm that combined with the quantum counting algorithm allows for a verification of the Riemann hypothesis for numbers far beyond the reach of any classical computer. Moreover, the Prime state turned out to be highly entangled with an entanglement spectrum intimately related to the Hardy-Littlewood constants for the pairwise distribution of primes.

=== Quantum computation ===
Through collaborative research efforts, Sierra implemented multiple quantum algorithms on the newly launched IBM quantum computers and introduced a quantum circuit capable of generating the Bethe eigenstates for the XXZ Hamiltonian. Additionally, he proposed a simple mitigation strategy for a systematic gate error in IBMQ quantum computers and demonstrated the implementation of data-driven error mitigation techniques to simulate quench dynamics on a digital quantum computer.

=== Quantum games ===
In 2022, Sierra, together with A. Bera and S. Singha Roy, demonstrated a connection between the ground state of a topological Hamiltonian and the optimal strategy in a causal order game, where the maximum violation of the classical bound is associated with a second-order quantum phase transition. Furthermore, working in conjunction with D. Centeno led to the development of several quantum versions of the Morra game, known as Chinos in Spain.

== Bibliography ==
=== Books ===
- Quantum Electron Liquids and High-Tc Superconductivity (1995) ISBN 978-3662140123
- Quantum Groups in Two-dimensional Physics (2011) ISBN 978-0521460651

=== Selected articles ===
- Günaydin, M, Sierra, G & Townsend, PK (1984). The geometry of N=2 Maxwell-Einstein supergravity and Jordan algebras. Nuclear Physics B 242 (1), 244–268.
- Alvarez-Gaume, L, Gomez, C. & Sierra, G (1989). Quantum group interpretation of some conformal field theories. Physics Letters B 220 (1–2), 142–152.
- Dukelsky, J., Martín-Delgado, M. A., Nishino, T., & Sierra, G. (1998). Equivalence of the variational matrix product method and the density matrix renormalization group applied to spin chains. Europhysics letters, 43(4), 457.
- Dukelsky, J., Pittel, S., & Sierra, G. (2004). Colloquium: Exactly solvable Richardson-Gaudin models for many-body quantum systems. Reviews of modern physics, 76(3), 643.
- Cirac, JI & Sierra, G (2010). Infinite matrix product states, conformal field theory and the Haldane-Shastry model. Physical Review B 81 (10), 104431.
- Alcaraz, F. C., Berganza, M. I., & Sierra, G. (2011). Entanglement of low-energy excitations in Conformal Field Theory. Physical Review Letters, 106(20), 201601.
- Latorre, J. I. & Sierra, G (2014), Quantum Computation of Prime Number Functions, Quantum Information and Computation, Vol. 14, 0577.
- Ramírez, G, Rodríguez-Laguna, J & Sierra, G. (2015). Entanglement over the rainbow. Journal of Statistical Mechanics: Theory and Experiment 2015 (6), P06002.
- Xavier, J. C., Alcaraz, F. C., & Sierra, G. (2018). Equipartition of the entanglement entropy. Physical Review B, 98(4), 041106.
- Sierra, G (2019). The Riemann zeros as spectrum and the Riemann hypothesis. Symmetry 11 (4), 494.
