= Antwerp Symphony Orchestra =

Orchestra in Antwerp, Belgium

The Antwerp Symphony Orchestra is a Belgian symphony orchestra based in Antwerp, with the Queen Elisabeth Hall as its principal concert venue. The orchestra performs in a number of venues in various cities in Belgium:

- Antwerp: Queen Elisabeth Hall, Cathedral of Our Lady
- Brussels: Paleis voor Schone Kunsten (Centre for Fine Arts)
- Bruges: Concertgebouw, Bruges
- Ghent: Muziekcentrum De Bijloke Gent

The orchestra operates under the auspices of the government of Flanders. The orchestra previously had the following names:

- De Philharmonie (1955–1983)
- De Philharmonie van Vlaanderen (1983–1985)
- Koninklijk Filharmonisch Orkest van Vlaanderen (1985–2002)
- Koninklijke Filharmonie van Vlaanderen / Royal Flemish Philharmonic (deFilharmonie; 2002–2017)

== History ==
Earlier orchestral associations in Antwerp included the Société Royale d’Harmonie d'Anvers, founded in 1814. In 1895, the Koninklijke Maatschappij voor Dierkunde (The Antwerp Royal Society for Zoology or KMDA) had the idea for organising zoo concerts. For this purpose, a special multi-purpose hall was built, now known as the Queen Elisabeth Hall.

In the period after the Second World War, Antwerp had only one professional orchestra, that of the Vlaamse Opera (Royal Flemish Opera). Gaston Ariën envisioned the formation of a full-time symphony orchestra with its own concert space for Antwerp. Together with Jef Maes and Steven Candael, Ariën decided to establish an orchestra modeled after the National Orchestra of Belgium. On 12 November 1955, this orchestra, De Philharmonie, came into formal existence. Finding a venue to rehearse and give concerts remained a challenge for many years. The one space in the city most suitable for the orchestra was the concert hall of the KMDA, which shuttered temporarily for renovations in 1958.

In 1959, Ariën recruited the Dutch conductor Eduard Flipse as the first chief conductor (chef-dirigent) of the orchestra. Following the re-opening of the KMDA, renamed the Queen Elisabeth Hall), the orchestra took up primary residence there. Flipse stood down as chief conductor of De Philharmonie in 1970. Enrique Jorda succeeded Flipse in 1970, and served in the post until 1975.

In 1975, André Vandernoot became chief conductor, and remained in the post in 1983. During his tenure, in 1980, De Philharmonie began a collaboration with the deSingel concert hall. In addition, the then-minister of culture, Karel Poma, had demanded bureaucratic reforms of the orchestra, with the installation of professional management. In response to Poma, De Philharmonie changed its name to De Philharmonie van Vlaanderen in 1983. In 1985, the orchestra changed its name further, to the Koninklijk Filharmonisch Orkest van Vlaanderen (Royal Flemish Philharmonic Orchestra).

In 1999, the orchestra's artistic management was reformed, with authority vested in the hands of three artistic leaders, rather than one conductor. In 2002, the orchestra renamed itself again, to the Koninklijke Filharmonie van Vlaanderen, or deFilharmonie.

Philippe Herreweghe was chief conductor (chef-dirigent) of the orchestra from 1998 to 2002. The orchestra's most recent chief conductor was Edo de Waart, who had been named to the post in April 2010 with an initial contract of 5 years. Although the original press release indicated the start of de Waart's tenure as 2012, de Waart formally took up the chief conductorship of the orchestra in 2011. de Waart concluded his chief conductorship of the orchestra at the close of the 2015–2016 season.

In April 2017, the orchestra formally announced its most recent renaming as the Antwerp Symphony Orchestra. Currently, Herreweghe has the title of principal guest conductor (vaste gastdirigent), and de Waart has the title of conductor laureate (eredirigent), with the Antwerp Symphony Orchestra. Under its various names, the orchestra has recorded for the A-list, Belgian Boutique, Hyperion, Naïve and Phi labels.

In November 2017, Elim Chan first guest-conducted the orchestra. She returned as guest conductor in March 2018. Based on these appearances, in May 2018, the orchestra announced the appointment of Chan as its next chief conductor, effective with the 2019–2020 season. Chan is both the youngest conductor and the first female conductor to be named chief conductor of the orchestra. Chan concluded her tenure as chief conductor of the orchestra at the close of the 2023–2024 season, one season earlier than her previously announced contract extension.

In October 2024, Marc Albrecht first guest-conducted the orchestra. In February 2025, the orchestra announced the appointment of Albrecht as its next chief conductor, effective with the 2026–2027 season. Albrecht took the title of chief conductor-designate for the 2025–2026 season.

In February 2026, the orchestra announced its merger with Opera Ballet Vlaanderen, effective 1 March 2026.

== Chief conductors ==
- Eduard Flipse (1959–1970)
- Enrique Jorda (1970–1975)
- André Vandernoot (1975–1983)
- Emil Tchakarov (1983–1986)
- Günter Neuhold (1986–1991)
- Muhai Tang (1991–1995)
- Grant Llewellyn (1995–1998)
- Philippe Herreweghe (1998–2002)
- Daniele Callegari (2002–2008)
- Jaap van Zweden (2008–2011)
- Edo de Waart (2011–2016)
- Elim Chan (2019–2024)
- Marc Albrecht (2026–present)

== Intendanten (Orchestra managers) ==
- François Cuvelier (1964–1983)
- Marc Clémeur (1984–1986)
- Luc Vanackere (1986–1991)
- Marc Anseeuw (1991–1992)
- Luc Vanackere (1993–2000)
- Jan Raes (2000–2004)
- Hans Waege (2004–2008)
- Jean Pierre Grootaers (2009)
- Hans Verbugt (2009–2015)
- Joost Maegerman (2015–2026)

== Sources ==
- Jan de Zutter, Jan Dewilde, Tom Eelen: Van de Philharmonie tot de Filharmonie, Antwerpen, 2005.
