= Maurice Béjart =

French-born Swiss ballet dancer and choreographer (1927–2007)

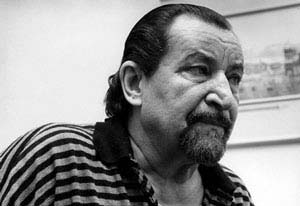
- Béjart in 1988
- Born: Maurice-Jean Berger; 1 January 1927; Marseille, France
- Died: 22 November 2007 (aged 80); Lausanne, Switzerland
- Occupations: Dancer, choreographer and opera director

Maurice Béjart (French: [beʒaʁ]; 1 January 1927 – 22 November 2007) was a French dancer, choreographer and opera director who ran the Béjart Ballet Lausanne in Switzerland. He developed a popular expressionistic form of modern ballet, tackling vast themes. He was awarded Swiss citizenship posthumously.

== Biography ==
Maurice-Jean Berger was born in Marseille, France, in 1927, the son of French philosopher Gaston Berger. Fascinated by a recital of Serge Lifar, he decided to devote himself to dance. In South France days, he had studied under Mathilde Kschessinska.

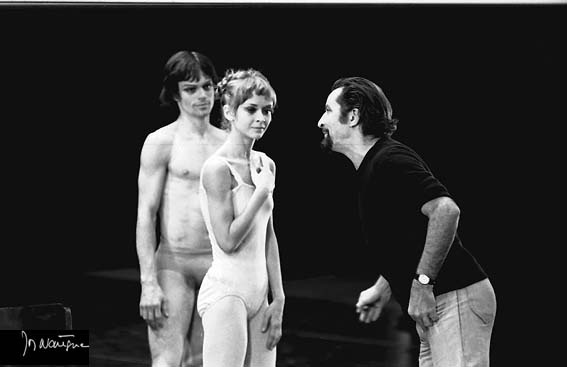
Béjart directing dancers Rita Porlvoorde and Bertrand Pie in Pli selon Pli, Brussels, 1976.

In 1945, he enrolled as a corps de ballet at the Opéra de Marseille. From 1946, he had studied under Madam Rousanne Sarkissian, Léo Staats, Madam Lyubov Yegorova and Olga Preobrajenska at "Studio Wacker", etc. in Paris.

In 1948, he also trained with Janine Charrat, Yvette Chauviré and then with Roland Petit, in addition he had studied under Vera Volkova at London.

In 1954, he founded the Ballet de l'Étoile company (dissolved in 1957). In 1960 he founded the Ballet du XXe Siècle in Brussels (dissolved in 1987).

In 1973, with the Ballet du XXe siecle, he premiered "Golestan", on a poem by Sa'di, based on Iranian traditional music. The ballet was commissioned by the Shiraz-Persepolis Festival of Arts where it was premiered. The first performance of "Improvisation sur Mallarme III" with music by the French composer Pierre Boulez also took place at that Festival in 1973. "Farah", also based on Iranian traditional music was the Ballet's own commission, premiered in Brussels in 1976 and brought to the Shiraz-Persepolis Festival that same year. The 1976 Festival also witnessed the first performance of "Heliogabalus", based on a poem by Artaud. The Festival's patron was Farah Pahlavi, the former Empress of Iran, with whom Béjart kept strong ties to the end.

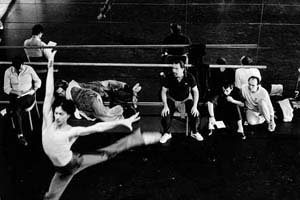
Directing dancers at the Béjart Ballet Lausanne, Switzerland, 1988.

In 1987 he moved to Lausanne in Switzerland, where he founded the Béjart Ballet Lausanne.

Among his works is a revised version of The Nutcracker, which he staged in 2000. It still uses Tchaikovsky's original score, but completely scraps the original plot and characters, instead supplying a new story about a boy's efforts to re-connect with his mother. The production design is full of erotic images, such as wombs and vaginal openings. One of the characters is Marius Petipa, who becomes Mephisto. Another character is called Felix the Cat.

== Boléro ==
One of Béjart's dance works was his choreography to French composer Maurice Ravel's "Boléro." In The New York Times, Jennifer Dunning described Béjart's "Bolero" as "probably his best known and most popular dance." Created in 1960 for the Yugoslav ballerina Duška Sifnios, the dance features a dancer on a tabletop, surrounded by seated men, who slowly participate in the dance, culminating in a union of the dancers atop the table. Dancers who performed Béjart's interpretation of "Bolero" include Sylvie Guillem from the Paris Opera Ballet, Grazia Galante, Maya Plisetskaya, Angele Albrecht, and Roberto Bolle. In a twist, Jorge Donn also played the role of the principal dancer, becoming the first male to do so. One of Donn's such performances can be seen in French filmmaker Claude Lelouch's 1981 musical, Les Uns et les Autres.

== Dance schools ==
Béjart was the founder of several dance schools:

- the Mudra School in Brussels, 1970–1988;
- the Mudra Afrique School in Dakar, 1977–1985;
- the Rudra School in Lausanne, 1992–2007.

== Awards ==
During his lifetime, Béjart received many awards and distinctions for his contributions to the arts.

- He received the Japanese Order of the Rising Sun.
- He received the Belgian Ordre de la Couronne.
- In 1974, he won the Erasmus Prize.
- In 1993, Praemium Imperiale
- In 1994, he was appointed to the Académie des Beaux Arts.
- Also in 1994, he received the Deutscher Tanzpreis.
- In 2003, he was appointed Commandeur des Arts et des Lettres.
- Also in 2003, he won the Prix Benois de la Danse for lifetime achievement.

== Filmography ==
- 1975: Je suis né à Venise with Jorge Donn, Shonah Mirk, Philippe Lison and Barbara
