= Theodore Bikel =

Austrian-American actor and folk musician (1924–2015)

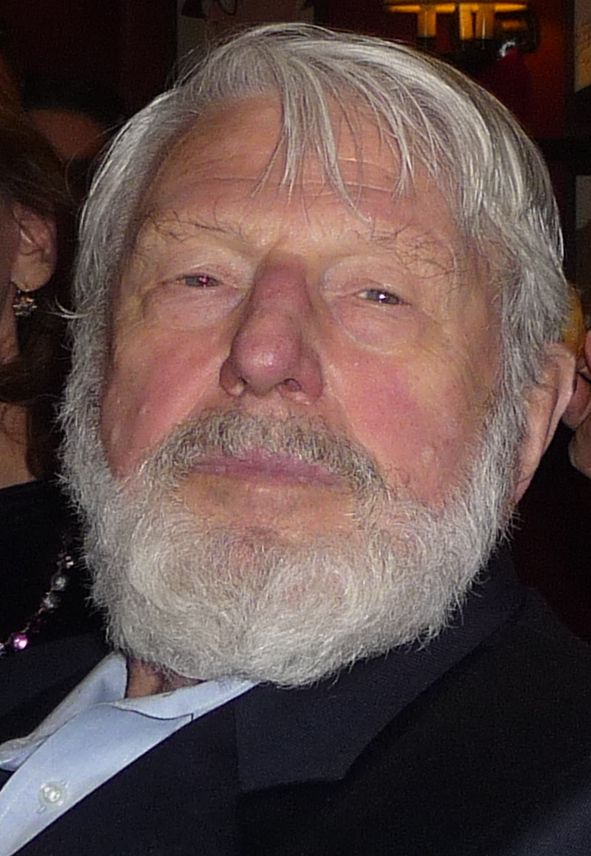
- Bikel in 2009
- Born: Theodore Meir Bikel; May 2, 1924; Vienna, Austria
- Died: July 21, 2015 (aged 91); Los Angeles, California, U.S.
- Resting place: Hillside Memorial Park Cemetery
- Occupations: Actor; singer; guitarist
- Years active: 1943–2013
- Spouses: Ofra Ichilov (m. 1952; div. 1953); Rita Weinberg Call (m. 1967; div. 2008); Tamara Brooks (m. 2008; died 2012); Aimee Ginsburg (m. 2013)

9th President of the American Actors' Equity Association
- In office 1973–1982
- Preceded by: Frederick O'Neal
- Succeeded by: Ellen Burstyn

Theodore Meir Bikel (/bɪˈkɛl/ bih-KEL; May 2, 1924 – July 21, 2015) was an Austrian-American actor, singer, and political activist.

He made his stage debut in Tevye the Milkman in Mandatory Palestine, where he lived as a teenager. He later studied acting at Britain's Royal Academy of Dramatic Art, and made his London stage debut in 1948 and in New York in 1955. He was also a widely recognized and recorded folk singer and guitarist. In 1959, he co-founded the Newport Folk Festival, and created the role of Captain von Trapp opposite Mary Martin as Maria in the original Broadway production of Rodgers & Hammerstein's The Sound of Music. In 1969, Bikel began acting and singing on stage as Tevye in the musical Fiddler on the Roof. The production won nine Tony Awards, and was one of the longest-running musicals in Broadway history.

He also appeared in films, including The African Queen (1951), Moulin Rouge (1952), The Kidnappers (1953), The Enemy Below (1957), I Want to Live! (1958), My Fair Lady (1964), The Russians Are Coming, the Russians Are Coming (1966), and 200 Motels (1971). For his portrayal of Sheriff Max Muller in The Defiant Ones (1958), he was nominated for the Academy Award for Best Supporting Actor.

Bikel was president of the Associated Actors and Artistes of America until 2014, and was president of Actors' Equity in the late 1970s and early 1980s. He served as the chairman of the board of directors of Partners for Zionist Israel, where he also lectured.

== Early years ==
Theodore Bikel was born into a Jewish family in Vienna, Austria, the son of Miriam (née Riegler) and Josef Bikel, from Bukovina. As an active Zionist, his father named him after Theodor Herzl, the founder of modern Zionism. Following the German annexation of Austria in 1938, Bikel's family fled to Palestine, where his father's contacts helped the family obtain British passports. Bikel studied at the Mikve Yisrael agricultural school and joined Kibbutz Kfar HaMaccabi.

Bikel started acting while in his teens. He performed with Habimah Theatre in 1943, and was one of the founding members of the Cameri Theatre, which became a leading Israeli theatre company. He described his acting experience there as similar to, if not better than, the method acting techniques taught at the Actors Studio in New York. "The Habimah people were much closer to the Method, indeed, than Lee Strasberg was, because they were direct disciples of Stanislavski."

In 1945, he moved to London to study at the Royal Academy of Dramatic Art. Finding work almost immediately, from the mid 40s to the late 50s, Bikel appeared in a slew of British B-movies, and the occasional 'A' film too, usually playing heavies and crooks of various European nationalities despite having perfected his English accent. He played the lead role in 1956 British film drama Flight from Vienna. Despite his success in the UK, the ever-ambitious Bikel travelled to the States in 1954 to pursue his career in the more lucrative Hollywood movie industry and on Broadway, becoming a naturalized citizen in 1961.

Bikel did not return to live in Israel, nor did he take part in the 1948 Arab–Israeli War. Bikel wrote in his autobiography, Theo: "A few of my contemporaries regarded [not returning to Palestine] as a character flaw, if not a downright act of desertion. In me there remains a small, still voice that asks whether I can ever fully acquit myself in my own mind."

== Career ==
=== Actor ===
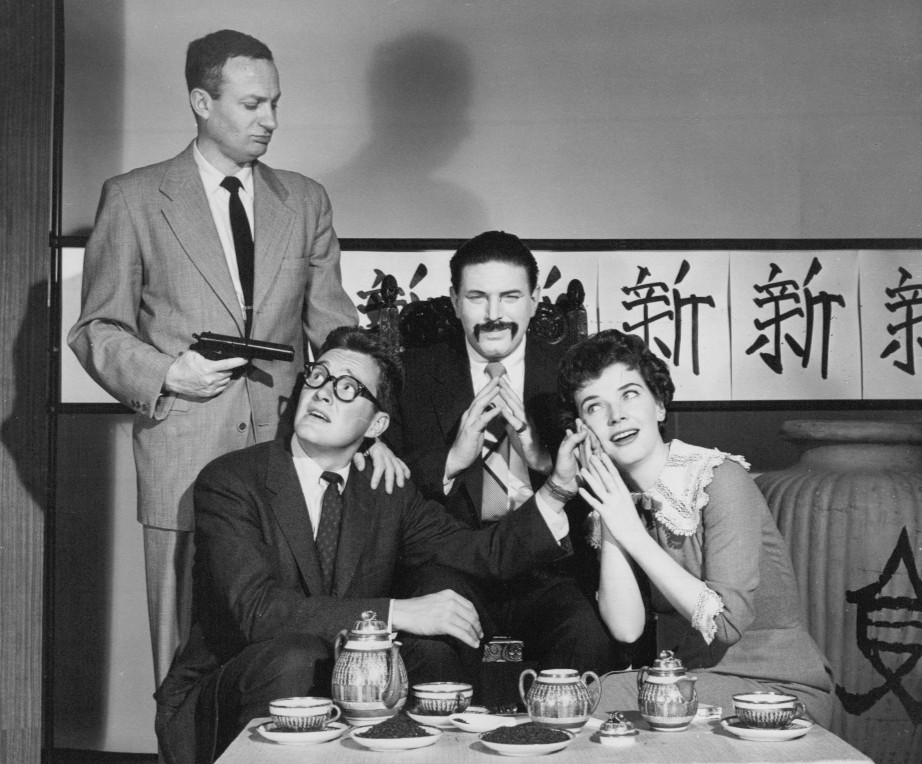
Bikel (back, center), performing in The Elgin Hour, 1955, with (l-r) Joe Mantell, Orson Bean, Polly Bergen

In 1948, Michael Redgrave recommended Bikel to his friend Laurence Olivier as understudy for the parts of both Stanley Kowalski and Harold "Mitch" Mitchell in the West End theatre district premiere of Tennessee Williams' A Streetcar Named Desire in London. Aside from being an understudy, Bikel's main role in the production was the relatively minor part of Pablo Gonzales. He graduated from supporting actor and understudy, though, to star opposite the director's wife, Vivien Leigh, with a sudden, unplanned performance when a co-star, playing the role of Mitch, came down with a minor illness. Bikel showed up backstage and went directly to Leigh's dressing room to ask if she wanted to rehearse with him, to make sure he was right for the role. She replied that she did not need to: "Go and do it," she said. "You are a professional, and Larry gave you this job because he trusted you to do it well." After the show, Leigh told him, "Well done."

For most of his acting career, he was known for his versatility in playing characters of different nationalities and ethnic backgrounds; he claimed he took on those different personalities so his acting would "never get stale". On television, he played an Armenian merchant on Ironside, a Polish professor on Charlie's Angels, a tyrannical American law school professor on The Paper Chase (television version of the earlier feature film The Paper Chase (1973), starring John Houseman as Professor Kingsley), a Bulgarian villain on Falcon Crest, a Belarusian on Star Trek: The Next Generation, and an Italian on Murder, She Wrote.

In movies, he played an Imperial German naval gunboat officer in the First World War in The African Queen (1951) opposite Humphrey Bogart and Katharine Hepburn and in the World War II combat film on a Nazi German U-boat / submarine in The Enemy Below (1957) starring Robert Mitchum and Curd Jürgens, a Southern "redneck" sheriff chasing two chained escaped convicts Sidney Poitier and Tony Curtis in The Defiant Ones, and a Russian submarine captain whose boat gets grounded on the beach near the rural village on Gloucester Island of the New England rocky coast causing residents to panic of a threatening Russian Soviet Union / Red Navy invasion in the Cold War era comedy The Russians Are Coming, the Russians Are Coming!!! (1966), along with Alan Arkin, Brian Keith, Jonathan Winters and Carl Reiner. He also portrayed the sadistic General Jouvet in The Pride and the Passion (1957), and was screen tested for the role of Auric Goldfinger in the James Bond film Goldfinger (1964), though the part ultimately went to German actor Gert Fröbe. In My Fair Lady (1964), he played the overbearing Hungarian linguist Zoltan Karpathy.

He made his Broadway debut in 1955 in Tonight in Samarkand, and in 1958 was nominated for a Tony Award for Best Featured Actor in a Play for The Rope Dancers. In 1959, he created the role of Austria-Hungary Empire naval Captain von Trapp in the original stage musical production of The Sound of Music, which earned him a second "Tony" nomination. Bikel did not like his role because his ability to sing was underused; neither did he enjoy performing the role of the captain repeatedly. When the famous longtime musical composers Rodgers and Hammerstein realized Bikel was an accomplished folk singer, they wrote the song "Edelweiss" (purporting within the story to be an Austrian folk song) specifically for him to sing and accompany himself on the guitar.

In 1964, he played Zoltan Karpathy, the dialect expert, in the film version of My Fair Lady. Since his first appearance as Tevye in the musical Fiddler on the Roof (1967), Bikel had performed the role more often than any other actor (over 2,000 times). When an injury required 74-year-old fellow Israeli performer Chaim Topol (veteran of many productions of the stage show and star of the later 1967 motion picture version) to withdraw from a high-budget, much-promoted 2009 North American tour of the revival musical, Bikel substituted for him in several appearances in 2010. Bikel read S.L. Shneiderman's narration of the 1966 documentary on Polish Jewry, The Last Chapter.

Bikel was a guest star on many popular television series in the 1950s (often called the first "Golden Age of Television"). He appeared in an episode of the 1954 NBC legal drama Justice based on cases from the Legal Aid Society of New York. He also appeared in the episode entitled "The Faithful Pilgrimage" of CBS's Appointment with Adventure anthology series. That particular episode was written by Rod Serling. He also appeared in a second episode of Appointment with Adventure entitled "Return of the Stranger". Bikel also appeared in an acting role in Frank Zappa's experimental film 200 Motels (1971).

Bikel continued guest-starring in the following decades of the 1960s and 1970s, beginning on Rod Serling's The Twilight Zone (episode "Four O'Clock" as Oliver Crangle). He appeared on episodes of the Western series of Wagon Train, and the World War II drama Combat! in the season-three episode "Mountain Man" as Francois Perrault. He followed these with roles in the police dramas Hawaii Five-O, Columbo (1977, "The Bye-Bye Sky High I.Q. Murder Case"), Charlie's Angels, The San Pedro Beach Bums, Cannon, and in Little House on the Prairie, and the long-running western series Gunsmoke. Bikel also acted in the international intrigue series Mission: Impossible, the 1980s primetime soap opera Dynasty, the iconic '70s sitcom of All in the Family (1978), and further police/detective dramas in the forms of Knight Rider; Murder, She Wrote; Law & Order; and Mickey Spillane's Mike Hammer (1987 episode "Elegy for a Tramp" as Gerringer).

In the early 1990s, he appeared on the science fiction series Star Trek: The Next Generation, in the episode "Family", playing Sergey Rozhenko, Worf's Belarusian-born adoptive father. Bikel continued in the sci-fi genre with performing two roles in the Babylon 5 universe, in 1994 as Rabbi Koslov in the first-season episode "TKO" and in 1998, as Ranger leader Lenonn in the TV movie Babylon 5: In the Beginning.

Bikel was nominated for the Drama Desk Award in 2010 for outstanding solo performance for Sholom Aleichem: Laughter Through Tears, an off-Broadway play that he also wrote. In 2012, Bikel played the title role in Visiting Mr. Green with the Harold Green Jewish Theatre Company in Toronto, Canada. In 2013, Bikel starred in Journey 4 Artists, a documentary that celebrates the power of music and religious diversity.

=== Folk singer and composer ===
In 1955, at the suggestion of Jac Holzman of Elektra Records, Bikel began recording songs, including several albums of Jewish folk songs and songs from Russia and other countries, making over 20 contemporary and folk music albums during his career. For those, he played acoustic guitar alone or accompanied by other musicians. He was able to sing in 21 different languages, including Yiddish, Hebrew, German, Russian, Hungarian, Romanian, French, medieval Spanish, Zulu, and English. His early albums included Israeli Folk Songs (1955) and Songs of Russian Old & New (1960). Bikel's live performances were issued on two albums: Bravo Bikel (1959), and Bikel on Tour (1963).

In 1959, Bikel co-founded the Newport Folk Festival (together with Pete Seeger, Harold Leventhal, Oscar Brand, and George Wein). He performed a number of recorded duets with Judy Collins at various festivals and on television. During an interview, when asked what inspired him to become involved in organizing a folk festival, he said that music was "one of the few answers to the chaos that we have," one of the only recourses to avoid social strife, and a means of giving youth hope for a better world.

In 1962, Bikel became the first singer besides Dylan to perform "Blowin' in the Wind" in public. Bikel viewed the then 21-year-old Bob Dylan as one of those young performers expressing emotional and social messages through song. In 1963, Bikel joined Dylan, Seeger, Peter, Paul and Mary, and Joan Baez for the festival grand finale as they sang "Blowin' in the Wind" and "We Shall Overcome". Following the festival, Bikel, Seeger, and Dylan traveled to a planned rally in Greenwood, Mississippi, to perform Dylan's newly written song, "Only a Pawn in Their Game", about the man who murdered Medgar Evers. Originally, only Bikel and Seeger were scheduled to perform, but Bikel wanted Dylan to go with them. He told Dylan's manager, Albert Grossman, "I'll tell you what. Buy him a ticket. Don't tell him where it came from. Tell him it's time to go down and experience the South."

Bikel's close friendship with Seeger was sometimes tested as a result of the Newport festival's choice of performers. On one occasion, Seeger became infuriated during Bob Dylan's legendary 1965 performance accompanied by the Paul Butterfield Blues Band. Seeger expected Bikel to support him: "Theo, for Chrissake—tell them. Set them straight!" Bikel, as well as Seeger, was shocked when Bob Dylan turned electric at the festival, an event some call "Dylan's declaration of musical independence", but Bikel stepped forward and told Seeger, "Peter, this band, these rebels—they are us. They are what we were 20 years ago. Remember?" Seeger stared at him "like a trauma victim", as Bikel succeeded in calming Seeger down enough to let the group finish their songs.

His album A Folksinger's Choice (1964) featured Jim McGuinn (as he was then known) on banjo. Bikel (with business partner Herb Cohen) opened the first folk music coffee house in Los Angeles, The Unicorn. Its popularity led to the two opening a second club, Cosmo Alley, which, in addition to folk music, presented poets such as Maya Angelou and comics including Lenny Bruce. Bikel became increasingly involved with civil-rights issues and progressive causes, and was a Eugene McCarthy delegate to the 1968 Democratic Convention.

== Personal life ==
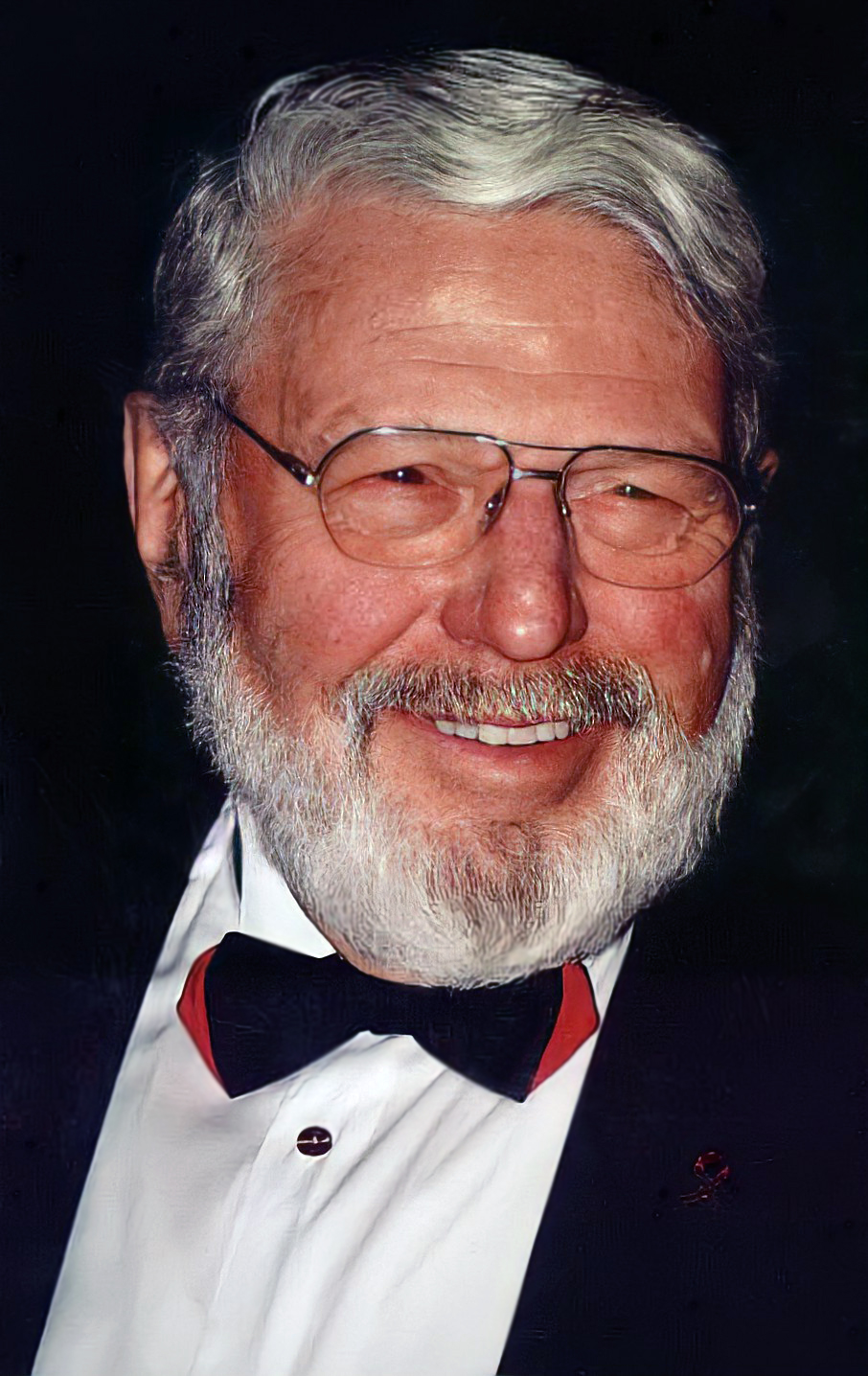
Bikel at the Kennedy Center Honors, Washington D.C., 2002

Bikel was married four times. He married Ofra Ichilov in 1952. They divorced the following year. His second marriage was in 1967 to Rita Weinberg Call, with whom he had two children. They divorced in 2008. He married conductor Tamara Brooks later that year. She died in 2012. He married journalist and foreign correspondent Aimee Ginsburg on December 29, 2013.

=== Political activism ===
Bikel was a longtime activist in the civil-rights and human-rights movements, participating as a fundraiser with performances. He co-founded the Actors Federal Credit Union in 1962, and in 1968, he was a delegate to the Democratic National Convention in Chicago. He was president of Actors' Equity from 1977 to 1982, in which office he supported human-rights causes. Since 1988, he had been president of the Associated Actors and Artistes of America.

Upon hearing of his death, Actors’ Equity wrote: "From the time he joined Equity in 1954, Bikel has been an advocate for the members of our union and his extraordinary achievements paved the way for so many. No one loved theater more, his union better, or cherished actors like Theo did. He has left an indelible mark on generations of members past and generations of members to come. We thank you, Theo, for all you have done."

Bikel was an active supporter and campaigner for John Kennedy. He did some of his campaigning during the run of The Sound of Music, which got him into trouble with the producers, who did not think it was becoming for an actor. He recalls, "I would go out sometimes between matinee and evening performances, go to a rally and speak from a flat-bed truck, and then come back to the theater." The producers stopped complaining, however, when after one show he was picked up backstage by a limousine carrying Eleanor Roosevelt, and he accompanied her to a Democratic rally as her special guest.

In 1968, Bikel supported the presidential campaign of Eugene McCarthy and attended the 1968 Democratic National Convention after being elected as a pro-McCarthy delegate in New York.

At the 1977 AFL–CIO Convention, Bikel welcomed Russian dissident Vladimir Bukovsky upon his release from the Soviet Union. He was arrested in front of the Soviet Embassy in Washington in 1986 while protesting the plight of Soviet Jews.

President Jimmy Carter appointed him to serve on the National Council for the Arts in 1977 for a six-year term. In 2007, he served as chair of the board of directors of Meretz USA (now Partners for Progressive Israel).

He was a member of the high-IQ collective Mensa International.

=== Death ===
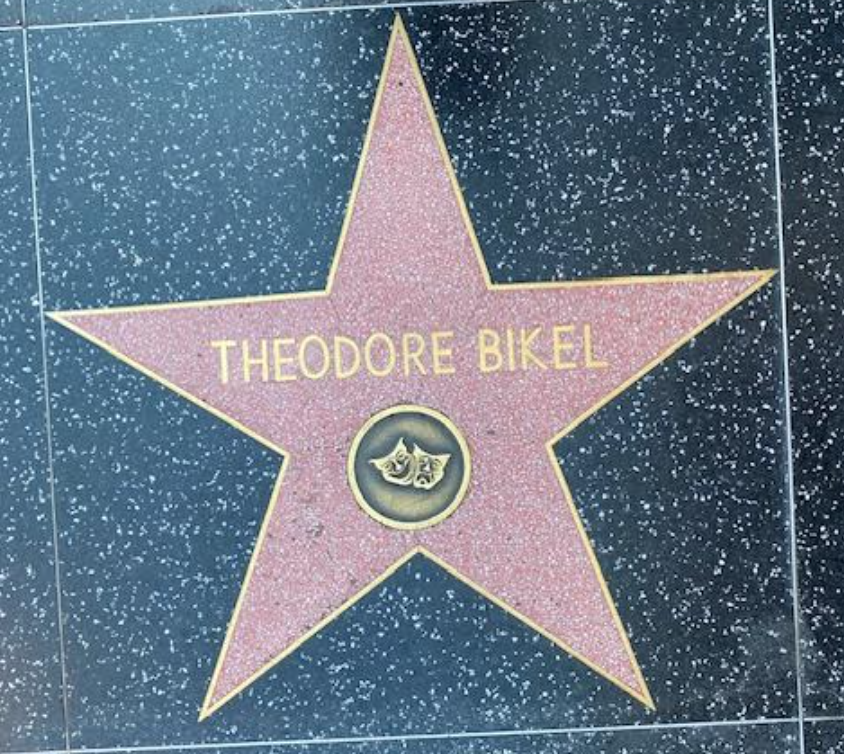
Bikel's star on the Hollywood Walk of Fame.

Bikel died on July 21, 2015, at Ronald Reagan UCLA Medical Center in Los Angeles of natural causes, according to publicist Harlan Boll, survived by Aimee Ginsburg, his sons from his second marriage, Robert and Daniel, and three grandchildren. He was buried at Hillside Memorial Park Cemetery in Culver City, California.

He was the last surviving principal cast member of The African Queen.

== Awards and recognition ==
- 1959 – Academy Award nomination for The Defiant Ones
- 1992 – Honorary Doctorate of the University of Hartford
- 1997 – Lifetime Achievement Award from the National Foundation for Jewish Culture
- 2005 – Star on the Hollywood Walk of Fame (6233 Hollywood Blvd.)
- 2008 – Golden Rathausmann of Vienna (November 27)
- 2009 – Austrian Cross of Honour for Science and Art, 1st class (November 15)
- 2014 – Lifetime Achievement Award from Rhode Island International Film Festival (August)

== Discography ==
- Folk Songs of Israel (1955), Elektra
- An Actor's Holiday (1956), Elektra
- A Young Man and a Maid (with Cynthia Gooding) (1957), Elektra
- Theodore Bikel Sings Jewish Folk Songs (1958), Elektra
- To Broadway, to Life!: The Musical Theater of Bock and Harnick
- Folk Songs from Just About Everywhere (with Geula Gill) (1959), Elektra
- More Jewish Folk Songs (1959), Elektra
- Bravo Bikel (Town Hall Concert) (1959), Elektra
- Songs of Russia Old and New (1960), Elektra
- Newport Folk Festival 1960 (five songs), Elektra
- The Sound of Music (Original Broadway Cast) (1960), Columbia Records
- From Bondage to Freedom (1961), Elektra
- A Harvest of Israeli Folk Songs (1961), Elektra
- The Poetry and Prophecy of the Old Testament (1962), Elektra (Note: This album was later retitled Theodore Bikel Does "Song of Songs" and Other Biblical Prophecies (reissued on Everest Records with Marian Seldes as Shulamit.))
- The Best of Bikel (1962), Elektra
- Theodore Bikel on Tour (1963), Elektra
- A Folksinger's Choice (1964), Elektra
- The King and I (1964), Columbia Records
- Yiddish Theatre and Folk Songs (1965), Elektra
- Songs of the Earth (with The Pennywhistlers) (1967), Elektra
- Theodore Bikel Is Tevye (1968), Elektra
- A New Day (1970), Reprise Records
- Silent No More (Soviet Jewish Underground) (1972), Star Records
- Theodore Bikel for the Young (1973), Peter Pan Records
- Theodore Bikel Sings Jewish Holiday Songs (1987)
- A Passover Story (1991), Western Wind
- A Chanukkah Story (1992), Western Wind
- Theodore Bikel Sings Jewish Folk Songs (CD reissue, 1992), Bainbridge Records
- Theodore Bikel Sings More Jewish Folk Songs (CD reissue, 1992) Bainbridge Records
- Rise Up and Fight! Songs of Jewish Partisans (1996), Holocaust Museum
- Tevye the Dairyman and the Railroad Stories (1996), Macmillan audio
- A Taste of Passover (1998), Rounder Records
- Classic Jewish Holiday & Shabbat Songs (2000), Sameach Records
- A Taste of Chanukkah (2000), Rounder Records
- Theodore Bikel's Treasury of Yiddish Folk & Theatre Songs (2004), Rhino Handmade
- In My Own Lifetime (2006), Jewish Music Group
- Our Song (with Alberto Mizrahi) (2007), Opus Magica Musica

== Filmography ==
Theodore Bikel film credits
Year	Title	Role	Notes
1951	Appointment with Venus	Man at Newspaper Vendor	Uncredited
1951	The African Queen	First Officer	
1952	Moulin Rouge	King Milan I of Serbia	
1953	Desperate Moment	Anton Meyer	
1953	Never Let Me Go	Lieutenant	
1953	Melba	Paul Brotha	
1953	A Day to Remember	Henri Dubot	
1953	The Kidnappers	Dr. Willem Bloem	
1954	The Love Lottery	Parsimonious	
1954	Forbidden Cargo	Max	
1954	The Young Lovers	Joseph	
1954	Betrayed	German Sergeant	Uncredited
1954	The Divided Heart	Josip	
1955	The Colditz Story	Vandy	
1955	Above Us the Waves	German Officer	
1956	Flight from Vienna	Colonel Sandor Kosice	
1957	The Vintage	Eduardo Uribon	
1957	The Pride and the Passion	General Jouvet	
1957	The Enemy Below	'Heinie' Schwaffer	
1958	Fräulein	Colonel Dmitri Bucaron	
1958	The Defiant Ones	Sheriff Max Muller	
1958	I Bury the Living	Andy McKee	
1958	I Want to Live!	Carl G.G. Palmberg	
1959	The Angry Hills	Dimitrios Tassos	
1959	Woman Obsessed	Dr. R.W. Gibbs	
1959	The Blue Angel	Klepert	
1960	A Dog of Flanders	Piet van Gelder	
1964	My Fair Lady	Zoltan Karpathy	
1965	Sands of the Kalahari	Dr. Bondarahkai	
1966	The Russians Are Coming, the Russians Are Coming	The Russian Captain	
1967	The Desperate Ones	Kisielev	
1968	Sweet November	Alonzo	
1969	My Side of the Mountain	Bando	
1970	Darker Than Amber	Meyer	
1971	200 Motels	Rance Muhammitz	
1972	The Little Ark	The Captain	
1974	Immigrants: We All Came to America	Narrator	
1984	Prince Jack	Georgi	
1986	Very Close Quarters	Victor	
1989	Dark Tower	Max Gold	
1989	See You in the Morning	Bronie	
1991	Shattered	Dr. Berkus	
1992	Crisis in the Kremlin	Leonid Filipenko	
1993	Benefit of the Doubt	Gideon Lee	
1993	My Family Treasure	Grandpa Danieloff	
1997	Shadow Conspiracy	Professor Yuri Pochenko	
1998	Second Chances	Dutch John Hathaway	
2002	Crime and Punishment	Captain Koch	
2007	The Little Traitor	Interrogator	

=== Television ===
Theodore Bikel television credits
Year	Title	Role	Notes
1947	The Cherry Orchard		TV movie
1953	Johnny, You're Wanted	Ferrari	TV miniseries
1954	The Philco Television Playhouse		Episode: "The King and Mrs. Candle"
1955	The Elgin Hour	Mr. Wu	Episode: "San Francisco Fracas"
1955	Studio One in Hollywood	Machek	Episode: "Passage of Arms"
1955	Studio One in Hollywood	Julius Caesar	Episode: "Julius Casar"
1955	Armstrong Circle Theatre		Episode: "Perilous Night"
1955	Star Tonight		Episode: "Footfalls"
1955	Appointment with Adventure	Richter	2 episodes
1955	Producers' Showcase		Episode: "The King and Mrs. Candle"
1955	Strange Experiences	Man	Episode: "Portrait of Paula"
1955	Justice		Episode: "Track of Fear"
1955	Goodyear Television Playhouse	Paul Laurent	Episode: "Visit to a Small Planet"
1955	The United States Steel Hour	Fritz Gerhardy	Episode: "Scandal at Peppernut"
1956	The United States Steel Hour	Grigor Dimitorski	Episode: "Hunted"
1956	The Alcoa Hour	Il Vecchio	Episode: "A Patch of Faith"
1956	Studio One in Hollywood	Grossman	Episode: "The Power"
1957	Climax!	Martin Humphries	Episode: "The Mad Bomber"
1957	Alfred Hitchcock Presents	Sergeant Ottermole	Season 2 Episode 32: "The Hands of Mr. Ottermole"
1957	Studio One in Hollywood	Henri Blanchard	Episode: "Death and Taxes"
1957	There Shall Be No Night	Uncle Vlahos	TV movie
1958	DuPont Show of the Month		Episode: "The Bridge of San Luis Rey"
1958	Playhouse 90	Rapp	Episode: "Word from a Sealed-Off Box"
1958	Folio	Barbaso	Episode: "The Hostage"
1959	Hotel de Paree	Carmoody	Episode: "Sundance Returns"
1960	The Play of the Week	Sender	Episode: "The Dybbuk"
1960	Directions	Host	Episode: "Footnotes to Jewish Music"
1961	Naked City	Nicholas Rozinski	Episode: "Murder Is a Face I Know"
1962	Naked City	Dr. Stanley Wilford	Episode: "Portrait of a Painter"
1962	Wagon Train	Dr. Denker	Episode: "The Dr. Denker Story"
1962	The Twilight Zone	Oliver Crangle	Episode: "Four O'Clock"
1962	The Dick Powell Show	Captain Bellini	Episode: "The Prison"
1962	The Dick Powell Show	Nicholas Simonakis	Episode: "Pericles on 31st Street"
1962	General Electric Theater	Rabbi Halevy	Episode: "The Bar Mitzvah of Major Orlovsky"
1962	Dr. Kildare	Dr. Mahmel Homatka	Episode: "The Visitors"
1962	Route 66	Dr. Anton Koseloff	Episode: "Only by Cunning Glimpses"
1962	Sam Benedict	Neil Bonney	Episode: "So Various, So Beautiful"
1962	Alcoa Premiere	Stefan Tamarow	Episode: "The Potentate"
1963	The DuPont Show of the Week	Diamond Cutter – Herbert Vanderling	Episode: "Diamond Fever"
1963	East Side/West Side	George Everett, Sr.	Episode: "No Wings at All"
1963	Theatre of Stars	Ralph Traven	Episode: "Corridor 400"
1964	The Doctors and the Nurses	Dr. Kralik	Episode: "The Forever Child"
1964	Combat!	Francois Perrault	Episode: "Mountain Man"
1964	Rawhide	Pence	Episode: "Canliss"
1964	Burke's Law	Vic Bates	Episode: "Who Killed the Surf Board?"
1965	Burke's Law	Senor Manfred Gonzales	Episode: "Who Killed the Rest?"
1965	Gunsmoke	Martin Kellums	Episode: "Song for Dying"
1965	The Trials of O'Brien	Ben Moravian	Episode: "The Trouble with Archie"
1965	Who Has Seen the Wind?	Josef Radek	TV movie
1966	ABC Stage 67	Homer T. Hatch	Episode: "Noon Wine"
1967	The Diary of Anne Frank	Hans Van Daan	TV movie
1967	Saint Joan	Robert de Baudricourt	TV movie
1968	Mission: Impossible	General Casimir Zepke	Episode: "The Cardinal"
1969	Hawaii Five-O	Professor Erich Stoss	Episode: "Sweet Terror"
1971	Ironside	Arschag Divinian	Episode: "The Summer Soldier"
1972	Cannon	Mike Tampa	Episode: "Blood on the Vine"
1972	Killer by Night	Sergeant. Phl 'Sharkey' Gold	TV movie
1973	The Mod Squad	Max Kalatsis	Episode: "Cry Uncle"
1975	Medical Story	Danzinger	Episode: "Us Against the World"
1975	Murder on Flight 502	Otto Gruenwaldt	TV movie
1976	Victory at Entebbe	Yakov Shlomo	TV movie
1976	Calling Dr. Gannon	Joseph Zankov	Episode: "A Very Private War"
1976	Ellery Queen	Sergio Vargo	Episode: "The Adventure of the Two-Faced Woman"
1976	Little House on the Prairie	Yuli Pyatakov	Episode: "Centennial"
1977	Charlie's Angels	Professor Peter Wycinski	Episode: "Angels on a String"
1977	Columbo	Oliver Brandt	Episode: "The Bye-Bye Sky High I.Q. Murder Case"
1977	Testimony of Two Men	Peter Hegger	TV miniseries
1977	The San Pedro Beach Bums	Rashid	Episode: "Godfather's Five"
1978	Police Woman	Adamus Tarash	Episode: "Sons"
1978	Loose Change	Tom Feiffer	TV miniseries
1978	The Amazing Spider-Man	Mandak	Episode: "The Curse of Rava"
1978	Fantasy Island	Ambassador Eric Soro	Episode: "King for a Day/Instant Family"
1978	All in the Family	Albrecht 'Alvin' Klemmer	2 episodes
1978	The Stingiest Man in Town	Marley's Ghost (voice)	TV movie
1980	The Return of the King	Aragorn (voice)	TV movie
1982	Trapper John, M.D.	Vladimir Lopatkin	Episode: "Russians and Ruses"
1983	Knight Rider	Graham Deauville	Episode: "Chariot of Gold"
1984	Glitter		Episode: "On Your Toes"
1985	Hotel	Constantin Markos	Episode: "New Beginnings"
1985	Cover Up	Assad	Episode: "Rules to Die By"
1985	The Fall Guy	Kamal	Episode: "Reel Trouble"
1985	Hell Town		Episode: "Fast Louie"
1985	Dynasty	Warnick	4 episodes
1986	The Paper Chase	Professor George Ballard	Episode: "Suppressed Desires"
1987	The New Mike Hammer	Russell Garringer	Episode: "Elegy for a Tramp"
1987	Murder, She Wrote	Professor Harold Crenshaw	Episode: "Indian Giver"
1987–1988	Falcon Crest	Marin Dimitrov	Recurring role
1988	A Stoning in Fulham County	Abe Moser	TV movie
1988	Buck James		Episode: "Almost Perfect"
1988	Beauty and the Beast	Eli	Episode: "Chamber Music"
1988	The Equalizer	Voorhees	Episode: "Day of the Covenant"
1989	Christine Cromwell	Horace	3 episodes
1989	Murder, She Wrote	Rosanno Bertolucci	Episode: "When the Fat Lady Sings"
1989	The Final Days	Henry Kissinger	TV movie
1990	City	Dr. Calagari	Episode: "You Can't Bite City Hall"
1990	Star Trek: The Next Generation	CPO Sergey Rozhenko	Episode: "Family"
1991	The New Lassie	Scotty MacPherson	Episode: "The Gathering of the Clans"
1991	Memories of Midnight	Napoleon Chotas	TV miniseries
1991	Murder, She Wrote	Yuri Lermentov	Episode: "The List of Yuri Lermentov"
1992	L.A. Law	Kurt Rubin	Episode: "Great Balls Afire"
1994	Law & Order	Sol Bregman	Episode: "Snatched"
1994	Babylon 5	Rabbi Koslov	Episode: "TKO"
1994	Murder, She Wrote	Inspector Van Horn	Episode: "Amsterdam Kill"
1996	The Burning Zone	Old Priest	Episode: "St. Michael's Nightmare"
1997	Brooklyn South	Solomon Shuyler	Episode: "Why Can't Even a Couple of Us Get Along?"
1997	Michael Hayes		Episode: "Death and Taxes"
1998	Babylon 5: In the Beginning	Lenonn	TV movie
1998	The Pretender	Martin Zeller/Dr. Werner Krieg	Episode: "Hazards"
2000	H.U.D.	Ambassador Bjorn Jorgenson	TV movie
2003	JAG	Farmer with Plane	Episode: "A Tangled Webb: Part 1"

== Books ==
- Bikel, Theodore (1960). Folksongs and Footnotes: An International Songbook. Meridian Books, Inc.
- Bikel, Theodore (2002). Theo: An Autobiography. University of Wisconsin Press. ISBN 978-0299182847.

== See also ==
- List of German-speaking Academy Award winners and nominees
- Long-running musical theatre productions
