= Bonar Bain =

Canadian actor

- Born: Bonar Stewart Bain; February 4, 1923; Lethbridge, Alberta, Canada
- Died: February 18, 2005 (aged 82); Edmonton, Alberta, Canada
- Occupation: Actor
- Spouse: Vella Bain (m. 1945)
- Children: 3
- Relatives: Conrad Bain (twin brother)

Bonar Stewart Bain (February 4, 1923 – February 18, 2005) was a Canadian actor and the identical twin brother of actor Conrad Bain.

== Early life, family and education ==
Bain was born in Lethbridge, Alberta, the son of Jean Agnes (née Young) and Stafford Harrison Bain, a wholesaler. His twin brother, Conrad, also became an actor.

== Career ==
Bain once played a fictional "evil" twin to Conrad ("Hank Bain") in an episode of SCTV, as well as appearing on two of his brother's television series: as Arthur Harmon (Conrad Bain)'s twin brother, the libidinous, larcenous Arnold, on the sitcom Maude, and, in drag, as Anna Van Drummond, on the sitcom Diff'rent Strokes.

== Death ==
He died of cancer in Edmonton, Alberta on February 18, 2005, at the age of 82. He was survived by his wife Vella, who died in January 2011, at the age of 85.

== In popular culture ==
Bain figures in the lyrics to "Bober," a song from the Mike Keneally Band's 2004 album Dog. Keneally sings that his dog, Bober, was "half-named after Conrad Bain's brother."

== Filmography ==
- Draw! as Poker Player (1984)
- Diff'rent Strokes as Anna Van Drummond (1983)
- Running Brave as University Professor (1983)
- SCTV Network as Hank Bain (in "Zontar") (1981)
- Powder Heads as Dispatcher (1980)
- Maude as Arnold Harmon (in "Vivian's Surprise") (1977)
