= Mayerling (Producers' Showcase) =

- Producers' Showcase episode
- Mel Ferrer and Audrey Hepburn
- Episode no.: Season 1 Episode 32
- Directed by: Anatole Litvak
- Original air date: February 4, 1957
- Running time: 90 minutes

Guest appearances
- Audrey Hepburn; Mel Ferrer; Diana Wynyard; Basil Sydney; Raymond Massey; Judith Evelyn

Episode chronology
| ← Previous "Ruggles of Red Gap" | Next → "Romeo and Juliet" |

"Mayerling" is an episode of the American television series Producers' Showcase made for NBC Television, which was aired on 4 February 1957 and released theatrically as a film in Europe.

The film was produced and directed by Anatole Litvak, who had previously directed the French film version of Mayerling (1936) which was an international hit and brought Litvak to Hollywood. The 1957 version stars Audrey Hepburn and Mel Ferrer, Raymond Massey, Diana Wynyard, Basil Sydney, Judith Evelyn, Isobel Elsom, Lorne Greene, Nancy Marchand, David Opatoshu, Suzy Parker, Nehemiah Persoff, Pippa Scott, Monique van Vooren, and Lilia Skala.

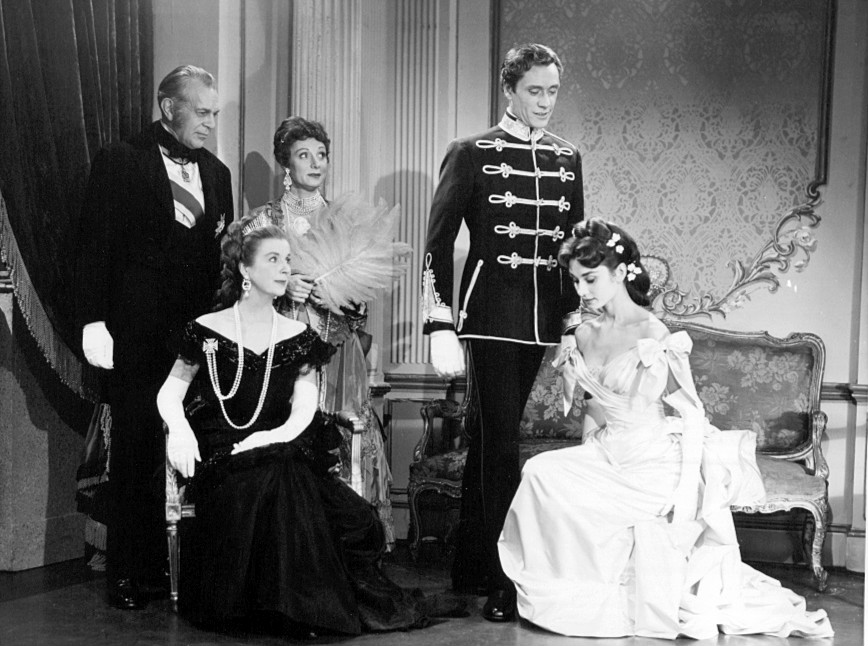
Raymond Massey, Diana Wynyard (seated), Judith Evelyn, Mel Ferrer, and Audrey Hepburn in Mayerling (TV episode of Producers' Showcase, 1957)

== Synopsis ==
The story of Mayerling is based on the historical Mayerling incident, the tragic love affair between Crown Prince Rudolf of Austria and his mistress, Baroness Mary Vetsera, and the mystery surrounding their apparent murder/suicide on January 30, 1889, at the imperial hunting lodge in Mayerling, Lower Austria.

== Production ==
Ferrer and Hepburn were reportedly in negotiation for two and a half years to make the special. It was done live, except for some background footage shot in Vienna.

== Reception ==
The New York Times wrote that "a more pallid or elementary version of Mayerling would be difficult to imagine." "Hardly worth the trouble" said The Washington Post.

== Home media ==
Mayerling was remastered and released to DVD in Region 1. The primitive archival film copy has been digitally mastered from the original kinescope negative and released on "Mr. FAT-W Video" silver and blue label by Films Around the World.

This hugely-expensive live television production was broadcast just once, on NBC, on February 24, 1957. The program was archivally preserved on kinescope which is a B&W 16mm film taken from a studio monitor of the broadcast. Although the program cost more than $500,000 — at a time when the per capita income of Americans was about $2,000 — the kinescope budget was a paltry $1,500. Clearly, it was not thought that the production had a future beyond the single live network broadcast; only a few prints were made, which were loaned, not given, to a few people involved with the production.

Kinescopes have such poor quality that for many years they were thought to be unusable for modern video and television. However, advances in digital technology have made it possible to master Mayerling from the original kinescope negative and print materials in high definition, which mysteriously brings out more details than could be seen with the naked eye watching the television broadcast.

The master was then upgraded using the latest digital programming — the grainy appearance was softened, blurred edges are put back in focus, brightness/darkness was adjusted, hand-editing replaced numerous frames with a flash of light with a duplicate frame preceding the bad frame, sound was upgraded to remove most static/pops/hisses, and so on. The finished HD master was then edited to make versions with and without commercials available, and then "stepped down" to standard definition for video; the four acts were digitally marked so that a "skip ahead" goes from act to act.

Finally, permission for the video release was obtained from Sean Ferrer, Luca Dotti, and Mel Ferrer's widow. The film is now available on Region 2 DVD.

== See also ==
- Mayerling Incident
- Mayerling (1968 feature film)
