= Conrad Bain =

Canadian-American actor (1923–2013)

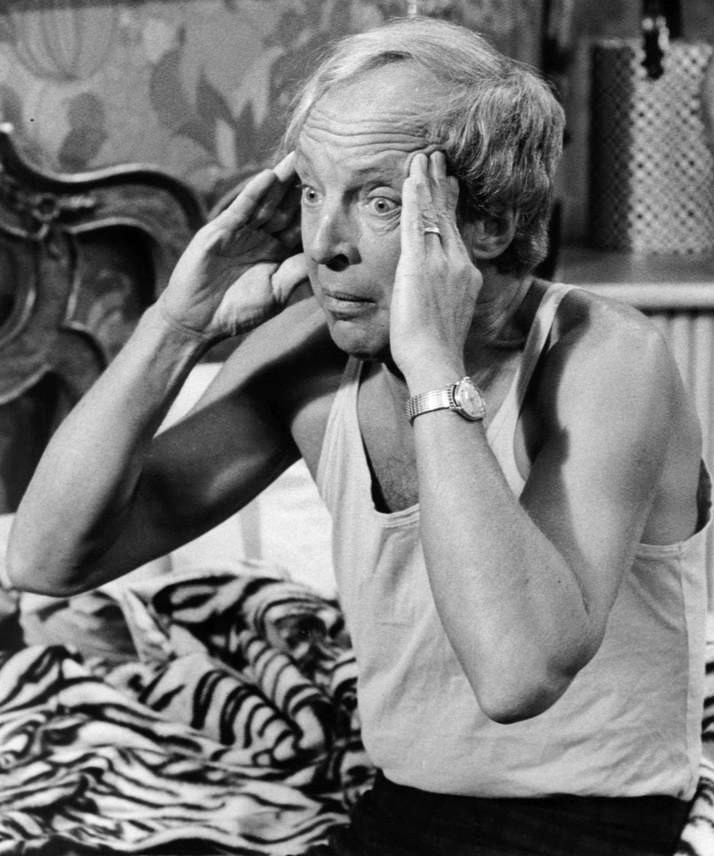
- Bain as Arthur Harmon in Maude, 1975
- Born: Conrad Stafford Bain; February 4, 1923; Lethbridge, Alberta, Canada
- Died: January 14, 2013 (aged 89); Livermore, California, U.S.
- Education: Banff School of Fine Arts; American Academy of Dramatic Arts
- Occupation: Actor
- Years active: 1952–1996, 2011
- Known for: Dr. Arthur Harmon on Maude, Phillip Drummond on Diff'rent Strokes
- Television: Diff'rent Strokes, Maude
- Spouse: Monica Sloan (m. 1945; died 2009)
- Children: 3
- Relatives: Bonar Bain (twin brother)

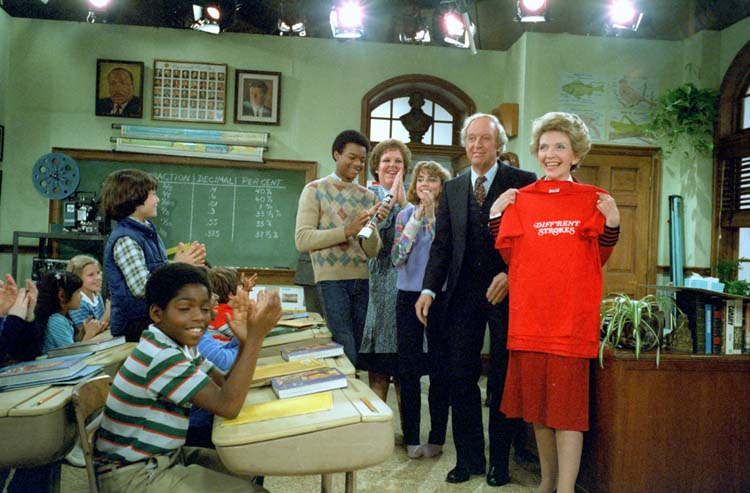
The cast of Diff'rent Strokes with guest star Nancy Reagan in 1983

Conrad Stafford Bain (February 4, 1923 – January 14, 2013) was a Canadian-American actor. His television credits include a leading role as Phillip Drummond in the sitcom Diff'rent Strokes (1978–1986), as Dr. Arthur Harmon on Maude (1972–1978), and as Charlie Ross in Mr. President (1987–1988).

== Biography ==
=== Early life ===
Conrad Bain was born in Lethbridge, Alberta, the son of Jean Agnes (née Young) and Stafford Harrison Bain, who was a wholesaler. He was an identical twin with actor Bonar Bain. He first appeared in a play in his senior year of high school, which sparked his interest in theatre.

Conrad studied at the Banff School of Fine Arts before serving in the Canadian Army during World War II. Bain became a naturalized citizen of the United States in 1946. In 1948, he graduated from the American Academy of Dramatic Arts in New York; one of his classmates was comedian Don Rickles.

=== Career ===
After a stint at the Stratford Festival in Canada, Bain had further success as a stage actor in the 1956 revival of Eugene O'Neill's The Iceman Cometh. The New York Times reviewer noted that his role was "especially well acted." He performed in Candide at the Martin Beck Theatre from 1956 to 1957. In 1961, he performed in Advise and Consent. He performed in Hogan's Goat in 1965, The Kitchen in 1966, and Scuba Duba in 1967. In 1970, he performed in the original Off Broadway run of Steambath. In 1971, he performed in An Enemy of the People and in 1973, he performed in Uncle Vanya.

Bain also found work on television; in 1966 he appeared in the cult supernatural soap opera Dark Shadows as the town innkeeper, Mr. Wells, during seasons 1 and 2, before his character was killed.

In 1962, Bain was one of the principal organizers of the Actors Federal Credit Union, inspired by an actor who could not obtain credit at a local department store. Bain served as the credit union's first president.

In 1970, Bain appeared in the film Lovers and Other Strangers and in 1971, he appeared in Woody Allen's Bananas.

He was cast by producer Norman Lear as Dr. Arthur Harmon, Bea Arthur's title character's conservative nemesis, who married her best friend, Vivian, in Maude (1972–1978).

Based on his success in Maude, Bain was cast in Diff'rent Strokes (1978–1986) as Park Avenue millionaire Phillip Drummond, who adopted two orphaned African-American boys from Harlem, Willis and Arnold, to live with him and his daughter, Kimberly, and housekeeper, Mrs. Garrett. In 1979, he played Phillip Drummond in an episode of The Facts of Life. In 1996, Bain reprised his role of Phillip Drummond alongside Gary Coleman as Arnold Jackson on the series finale of The Fresh Prince of Bel-Air. Producer Norman Lear said Bain had "a very rare comedic spine".

In 1987, Bain starred in Mr. President, a political sitcom. In 1991 and 1992, he performed in On Borrowed Time, his last Broadway theatre production.

=== Death ===
Bain died from a stroke on January 14, 2013, in Livermore, California, at the age of 89. His body was cremated.

== Personal life ==
Bain had two sons and a daughter with Monica Sloan (1923–2009), whom he wed in 1945; they remained married until her death in 2009. His twin brother died in 2005.

== Filmography ==
=== Film ===
Year	Title	Role	Notes
1967	The Borgia Stick	Lawyer	TV movie, Uncredited
1968	Madigan	Hotel Clerk	
1968	A Lovely Way to Die	James Lawrence	
1968	Star!	Salesman at Cartier's	Uncredited
1968	Coogan's Bluff	Madison Avenue Man	
1969	Last Summer	Sidney	Uncredited
1970	Lovers and Other Strangers	Priest in Confessional	Uncredited
1970	I Never Sang for My Father	Rev. Sam Pell	
1971	Fury on Wheels	Lester Jump	Alternate title: Jump
1971	A New Leaf	Professor Heinrich	Uncredited
1971	Bananas	Semple	
1971	The Anderson Tapes	Dr. Rubicoff	
1971	Who Killed Mary What's 'Er Name?	Val Rooney	
1971	Men of Crisis: The Harvey Wallinger Story	President Richard M. Nixon	Short film
1972	A Fan's Notes	Poppy	
1972	Up the Sandbox	Dr. Gordon	
1975	Twigs	Swede	TV movie
1979	C.H.O.M.P.S.	Ralph Norton	
1979	A Pleasure Doing Business	Herb	
1981	Child Bride of Short Creek	Frank King	TV movie
1990	Postcards from the Edge	Grandpa	

=== Television ===
Year	Title	Role	Notes
1952	Studio One in Hollywood	Dr. Caldwell	Episode: "The Hospital"
1956	Studio One in Hollywood	Evans	Episode: "Family Protection"
1961	Naked City	Miller	Episode: "The Day the Island Almost Sank"
1961	The Defenders	D.A. Fred Monahan	Episode: "Gideon's Follies"
1965	The Trials of O'Brien	District Attorney	Episode: "Dead End on Flugel Street"
1966	Dark Shadows	Hotel Clerk	Episodes #1.1, #1.11, #1.61
1967	N.Y.P.D.	Manager	Episode: "Shakedown"
1968	Dark Shadows	Mr. Wells	Episode #1.632
1970	The Edge of Night	Dr. Charles Weldon #1	Unknown episodes
1972–1978	Maude	Dr. Arthur Harmon	Main cast (121 episodes)
1978	The Waverly Wonders	Tate Sr.	Episode: "Tate vs. Tate"
1978	Grandpa Goes to Washington	Robert Green	Episode: "Kelley at the Bat"
1978	The Love Boat	Les	Episode: "Till Death Do Us Part-Maybe/Locked Away/Chubs"
1978–1986	Diff'rent Strokes	Philip Drummond	Main cast (189 episodes)
1979	Hello, Larry	Philip Drummond	Episode: "The Trip: Part 2"
1979	The Facts of Life	Philip Drummond	Episode: "Rough Housing"
1979	Hello, Larry	Philip Drummond	Episode: "Feudin' and Fussin': Part 2"
1979	Hello, Larry	Philip Drummond	Episode: "Thanksgiving Crossover: Part 2"
1980	The Beatrice Arthur Special	Himself	TV special, Uncredited
1980	CHiPs	Himself	Episode: "The Great 5K Star Race and Boulder Wrap Party: Part 2"
1985	The Love Boat	Leslie Campbell	Episode: "Instinct/Unmade for Each Other/BOS"
1985	The Love Boat	Charles Custers	Episode: "A Day in Port"
1987–1988	Mr. President	Charlie Ross	Main cast (24 episodes)
1993	The Adventures of the Black Stallion	Tobias Doyle	Episode: "Legends Never Die"
1996	The Fresh Prince of Bel-Air	Philip Drummond	Episode: "I, Done: Part 2"
