= Actors Federal Credit Union =

- Formation: 1962; 64 years ago
- Type: Not-for-profit credit union
- Purpose: Serving the creative community for over 60 years
- Headquarters: New York, New York, United States
- Location: 165 West 46th Street, New York, NY. 10036
- Official language: English
- CEO / President: Chuck Brown
- Website: actorsfcu.com

Actors Federal Credit Union (ActorsFCU) is an American federally chartered credit union—a cooperatively run, not-for-profit financial institution, owned and controlled by its members. Based in New York City, New York, ActorsFCU is regulated and insured by the National Credit Union Administration (NCUA), an agency of the U.S. Federal Government comparable to the Federal Deposit Insurance Corporation. It is the 49th largest credit union in the state of New York and the 993rd largest credit union in the nation. It has an overall health score at DepositAccounts.com of a B, with a B+ Texas ratio. Currently led by Chuck Brown, ActorsFCU serves over 26,000 members of more than 190 organizations nationwide with assets of more than $300,000,000. ActorsFCU has 54 full-time employees with a main office and 4 branch offices.

== History ==
Actors FCU was incorporated on December 5, 1962. Its initial purpose was to facilitate members of Actors' Equity Association (AEA) in their pursuit of getting approved for credit. Actors often had difficulty obtaining loans or other banking serves due to their unpredictable finances and lack of traditionally defined steady employment.

The specific impetus behind the 1962 movement was an incident at a local department store: an AEA member was denied credit specifically due to the fact that he was an actor. This member proceeded to raise the issue at a union meeting and enlisted six men to take up the challenge of starting a credit union for those in the acting profession. These men—Conrad Bain, Anthony Saverino, Robin Craven, Herb Nelson, Theodore Bikel, Angus Duncan, and Bill Ross—formed the Actors Federal Credit Union in 1962 with the help of Leo Schwarz, Field Representative of the New York League of Credit Unions.

=== Milestones ===
- Late 1960s: Issued its first mortgage to actor Jerry Orbach
- 1979: Angela Lansbury was welcomed as the ten-thousandth member
- 1986: Merged with Local 700 Motion Picture Editors Guild Credit Union
- Late 1980s: Merged with Writers Guild of America, East Credit Union
- 1991: Merged with American Federation of Television and Radio Artists (AFTRA) Credit Union
- 1998: Helped get the Credit Union Membership Access Act (HR-1151) enacted
- 1999: Placed its first ATM and became NYC's number one credit union deployer of ATMs.
- 2002: NYC Council Speaker Gifford Miller and Third District Council member Christine Quinn along with Torrence Allen, delivered proclamations of congratulations to the ActorsFCU. Letters were also presented from New York State Senator Tom Duane and U.S. Senator Hillary Clinton. Public Advocate Betsy Gotbaum issued a proclamation declaring May 7 "Actors Federal Credit Union Day" in New York City, in perpetuity.

== Organization ==
Actors Federal is chartered by the NCUA and governed by a board of volunteers, elected by and from its membership. The Credit Committee, which oversees the issuance of loans to the membership, is also composed of volunteers elected by the membership. Members are encouraged to serve on committees, run for office, and vote at the annual meeting.

== Services ==
Actors FCU offers a range of account services generally offered by typical financial institutions such as credit cards and consumer loans (including balance transfer, cash advances, computer, union initiation fee, income tax, personal, vacation, and share secured), as well as auto loans and musical instrument loans. It has exempt status conferred by the state to engage in the business of mortgage loan servicing in New York without being registered as a mortgage loan servicer.

Currently, Actors FCU has five branch offices—two in New York City, including the main office in Times Square, one in Los Angeles, one in North Hollywood and one in Chicago.

Actors FCU is among the few institutions that offer Coogan Trust (SB 1162; CA) and UTMA/UGMA Accounts, designed to protect the earnings of child performers. By law, fifteen per cent of a young performer's gross earnings must be saved in these accounts, which are locked and are not available for withdrawal until the minor reaches the age of 18.

== Membership ==
Actors Federal Credit Union's field of membership is designated by the National Credit Union Administration (NCUA). Membership is limited to individuals who share the common bond defined in the credit union's charter. Members and employees of specified organizations and their immediate family members are eligible to join Actors FCU. The definition of "Immediate family members" includes, but is not limited to: spouse/significant other, children, grandchildren, siblings, parents, and grandparents. Any individual who joins the credit union as a family member is entitled to the same membership benefits available to the sponsoring member.

Membership in Actors FCU is limited to members of the following organizations:

- Actors' Equity Association
- Actors Fund Employees
- SAG-AFTRA
- American Guild of Musical Artists
- American Guild of Variety Artists
- Alliance for Inclusion in the Arts
- Allied Live
- American Creative Dance Center, Inc.
- Artichoke Dance Company
- Assn. of Theatrical Press Agents + Managers
- Atlantic Theater Company
- B1 Model Management
- Blue Man Group
- Boston Musicians' Association
- Broadway Cares / Equity Fight AIDS
- Camara Dance Unlimited
- Career Transition for Dancers
- Chicago Federation of Musicians – Local 10-208
- Circle Repertory Theater
- City Center of Music & Drama
- Dancers Over 40, Inc.
- DanceUSA
- The Dramatists Guild of America
- The Episcopal Actors Guild of America, Inc.
- FAB Communications, Inc.
- Folksbiene Yiddish Theatre
- Fractured Atlas Employees
- Gay Men's Health Crisis
- Gold Coast Entertainment
- Goodman Theatre
- Grossbard and Associates
- Guild of Italian American Actors
- Hartig Hilepo Agency, Ltd.
- HelpMeSee
- Hispanic Organization of Latin Actors
- John D. Kolenda and Associates
- The Lambs, Inc.
- The League of American Theaters and Producers
- LGBT Community Center Employees
- Lewis Foods, Inc.
- Lincoln Center Theater/Vivian Beaumont Theater
- Local 1 I.A.T.S.E. Stagehands Union (NYC)
- Local 2 I.A.T.S.E. Stagehands Union (Chicago)
- Local 4 Theatrical Stage Employees
- Local 51 The Models Guild
- Local 52 Motion Picture Studio Mechanics
- Local 161 Script Supervisors
- Local 306 I.A.T.S.E.
- Local 476 Motion Picture Studio Mechanics (Chicago)
- Local 600 Camera Persons
- Local 645 I.A.T.S.E.
- Local 700 Motion Picture Editors Guild
- Local 702 Lab Workers
- Local 751 Ticket Sellers and Treasurers
- Local 764 Theatrical Wardrobe Union
- Local 798 Makeup and Hair
- Local 802 American Federation of Musicians
- Local 829 United Scenic Artists
- Local 841 Cartoonists
- Local B-751 Telephone and Ticket Sellers
- Local H-63 Film Workers and Projectionists
- Manhattan Theater Club
- Marilyn Zitner Management
- Michael Howard Studios
- Milwaukee Repertory Theater
- The Mortgage Department
- MSM ATM Consulting, Inc.
- NAPAMA (National Assn. of Performing Arts Managers + Agents)
- New York Neo-Futurists
- New York Philharmonic
- New York Shakespeare Festival Public Theater
- New York Women in Film & Television
- Night Kitchen Radio Theatre
- Nvision Arts
- NYJazz Initiative
- On Location Education
- Pearl Theatre Company
- Pig Iron School for Advanced Performance Training
- Playwrights Horizons
- People in the Arts, Inc. (LA)
- Radian Records
- Radio City Entertainment
- RiteCheck, Inc.
- Roundabout Theater Company
- St. Malachy's Parish-NYC
- Second Stage Theater Company
- Signature Theatre Company
- Sisters in Crime
- Songwriters Guild of America
- Stage Directors and Choreographers Society
- Stage Managers' Association
- Stella Adler Studio of Acting
- Steppenwolf Theatre Company
- Symphony Space
- Tekserve Corporation
- The Ridiculous Theater Company
- Theater Communications Group
- Theater Development Fund Employees
- Theatre Row
- Third Millennium Solutions, Inc.
- Times Square Alliance Employees
- Twelfth Night Club, Inc.
- University/Resident Theatre Association
- Upright Citizens Brigade Theatre
- Vineyard Theatre
- Washington DC Federation of Musicians
- Wingspan Arts
- Women's Project & Productions, Inc.
- World Dance Theatre
- Writers Guild East
- Writers' Theatre
- Zelo Technologies
