= Flight from Vienna =

1955 British film by Denis Kavanagh

- Still from the film
- Directed by: Denis Kavanagh
- Screenplay by: Denis Kavanagh
- Produced by: E.J. Fancey
- Starring: Theodore Bikel; John Bentley
- Cinematography: Hal Morey
- Edited by: John Dunsford
- Production company: E.J. Fancey Productions
- Release date: 1955
- Running time: 57 minutes
- Country: United Kingdom
- Language: English

Flight from Vienna, also known as Escape from the Iron Curtain, is a 1955 second feature British film directed by Denis Kavanagh and starring Theodore Bikel and John Bentley.

== Plot ==
Colonel Sandor Kosice is a Hungarian police chief who escapes to Vienna seeking political asylum. However, his motives are under suspicion. He is sent back to Budapest to organise the escape of a scientist, whom he brings back to Vienna. Kosice is flown to London, where he survives an attempt made on his life. His motives are no longer questioned and he is granted asylum.

== Cast ==
- Theodore Bikel as Colonel Sandor Kosice
- John Bentley as Captain Lawton
- Donald Gray as Colonel George Gordon
- Carina Helm as Irma Kosice
- Adrienne Scott
- Oscar Wegerstek
- George Roderick
- Geoffrey Wilmer
- Harold Jamieson
- J. van Boolen
- Paul Homer
- Sybil Rares

== Critical reception ==
The Monthly Film Bulletin wrote: "A simple political thriller of modest pretensions, quite competently made and with a nicely judged performance by Theodore Bikel as Kosice."

Chibnall and McFarlane in The British 'B' Film described the film as: "a talky but quite convincing drama."

In British Sound Films: The Studio Years 1928–1959 David Quinlan rated the film as "average", writing: "Reasonably convincing drama with good performance by Bikel."
