= The Pennywhistlers =

American singing group

- Origin: New York City, U.S.
- Genres: Folk, World
- Years active: 1962–1968
- Past members: Francine Brown; Shelley Cook; Joyce Gluck; Alice Kogan; Deborah Lesser; Ethel Raim; Dina Silberman

The Pennywhistlers were an American singing group founded by folklorist and singer Ethel Raim and popular during the 1960s folk music revival. They specialized in Eastern European polyphonic vocal music, traditional and arranged, sung primarily a cappella. Folk singer Theodore Bikel, in his autobiography Theo, called them "the closest to the real thing in authenticity in the United States." Their repertoire also featured traditional American songs. The Pennywhistlers toured throughout the 1960s, appearing at the Sing Out! hootenanny at Carnegie Hall, the Fox Hollow Festival, and the Mariposa Folk Festival, among others. They shared the bill with performers such as Bob Dylan, Pete Seeger, Joan Baez, Reverend Gary Davis, Leonard Cohen, and many others.

== Recordings ==
- The Pennywhistlers (Folkways Records FW-8773, 1963)
- The Pennywhistlers: A Cool Day and Crooked Corn (Nonesuch H-72024, 1965)
- The Pennywhistlers – Songs From Everywhere (Verve Folkways – FV-9034, 1966, mono)
- The Pennywhistlers – Songs From Everywhere (Verve Folkways – FVS-9034, 1966, stereo)
- The Pennywhistlers: Folksongs of Eastern Europe (Nonesuch H-72007, 1967)
- Songs of the Earth (with Theodore Bikel) (Elektra)
