= The King and Mrs. Candle =

1955 American TV play

- Producers' Showcase episode
- Episode no.: Season 1 Episode 13
- Directed by: Arthur Penn
- Written by: Sumner Locke Elliott
- Original air date: August 22, 1955

"The King and Mrs Candle" is a 1955 American TV play. It was directed by Arthur Penn and written by Sumner Locke Elliott. It was an original musical for Producers' Showcase, although it adapted a 1954 episode of The Philco Television Playhouse written by Elliott.

== Premise ==
A European monarch, the King of Brandovia, comes to America when there is a revolution at home, and works as a dancing instructor. He falls in love with Mrs Candle, the widow who runs the dance school. His former fiance arrives and causes complications.

== Cast ==
- Cyril Ritchard
- Joan Greenwood
- Irene Manning
- Richard Haydn

== 1954 production ==
The script was originally written as an episode of The Philco Television Playhouse. It aired in 1954 and was directed by Arthur Penn and starred Cyril Ritchard and Joan Greenwood. Variety wrote "the kind of tongue-in-cheek comedy which tv viewers rarely get to enjoy, and which in fact is extremely difficult to put over, was managed with considerable gusto."

== Production ==
NBC enjoyed great success with a musical transmission of Peter Pan and decided to musicalise The King and Mrs Candle. Elliott did the adaptation, and Ritchard and Greenwood reprised their roles, as did director Arthur Penn. Music was by Moose Charlop (who had composed for Peter Pan) and lyrics were by Chuck Sweeney. NBC publicised the musical by promoting songs from the soundtrack recorded by Tony Martin ("Young Ideas") and Eydie Gorme.

== Songs ==
- "Young Ideas"
- "Absolutely Mad"
- "We Must Fly"
- "You're Lucky for Me"
- "What Is the Secret of Your Success"

== Reception ==
The New York Times called it "relaxing and enjoyable television".

Variety wrote "For what it was the Philco show was a pleasant romp. As a musical comedy, King and Mrs. Candle was something less satisfying."
