= Producers' Showcase =

American TV anthology series (1954–1957)

- Genre: Anthology
- Directed by: Kirk Browning; Vincent J. Donehue; Clark Jones; Anatole Litvak; Delbert Mann; Arthur Penn; Otto Preminger; Alex Segal; William Wyler
- Composers: Sammy Cahn and Jimmy Van Heusen; Moose Charlap; Harry Sosnik
- Country of origin: United States
- Original language: English
- No. of seasons: 3
- No. of episodes: 37

Production
- Executive producers: Fred Coe; Alvin Cooperman
- Producers: John Bloch; Fred Coe; Alvin Cooperman; Sol Hurok; Edwin Lester; Anatole Litvak; Fred Rickey; Alex Segal; Henry Solomon; Herbert Sussan; Robert Whitehead
- Running time: 90 mins.
- Production company: Showcase Productions

Original release
- Network: NBC
- Release: October 18, 1954 – May 27, 1957

Producers' Showcase is an American anthology television series that was telecast live during the 1950s in compatible color by NBC. With top talent, the 90-minute episodes, covering a wide variety of genres, aired under the title every fourth Monday at 8 pm ET for three seasons, beginning October 18, 1954. The final episode, the last of 37, was broadcast May 27, 1957.

Showcase Productions, Inc., packaged and produced the series, which received seven Emmy Awards, including the 1956 award for Best Dramatic Series.

== Production ==
In 1953, stage producer Leland Hayward had the idea to create a 90-minute TV series, a series of color spectaculars to be broadcast monthly on NBC. Hayward was represented by Saul Jaffe of the Madison Avenue law firm Jaffe & Jaffe; Henry Jaffe, the firm's senior partner, was national counsel for the American Federation of Television and Radio Artists, an organization he helped found. When illness forced Hayward to withdraw from the project, NBC partnered with Showcase Productions, an independent production company created by Henry and Saul Jaffe to produce the series. Producers' Showcase went on the air October 18, 1954.

The ambitious series presented a total of 37 live color programs, which included original musicals or plays, restaging of Broadway productions, great concert artists, and tribute programs. Producers' Showcase presented the first international show with live remote locations (Wide Wide World), and the first full-length Broadway production on color television (Peter Pan).

"Producers' Showcase has undoubtedly been a tremendous prestige presentation by the network with elaborate and worthy cultural productions," The New York Times published in 1957, the series' final year.

Producers' Showcase received seven Emmy Awards, including the 1956 award for Best Dramatic Series.

=== Premiere episode ===
Director Otto Preminger was invited to produce and direct Tonight at 8.30, a trio of one-act plays by Noël Coward, for the series premiere. Red Peppers, Still Life, and Shadow Play were three of 10 plays comprising a cycle the playwright had written to be performed on stage over the course of three evenings, and under this umbrella title they were presented on Producers' Showcase. The cast included Ginger Rogers, Trevor Howard, Gig Young, Ilka Chase, and Gloria Vanderbilt. Preminger had no experience in television, but he welcomed the opportunity to work in the medium.

From the beginning, the director obviously was in trouble. He believed a television production was no different from a film and lit the sets and placed the cameras accordingly. He failed to understand that during the actual live broadcast, he would be working with a monitor, pushing buttons to signal which camera should be operating. Rogers in particular was nervous about her performance, and Preminger spent a considerable amount of time with her, but basically ignored the rest of the cast. Supporting player Larkin Ford later recalled he felt Preminger had no sense of Coward's work or how it should be played.

As the production entered its third week of rehearsals, a complete run-through still had not been accomplished. Three days prior to the broadcast, executive producer Fred Coe decided to take action. He privately fired Preminger and then simply told the cast and crew, "Mr. Preminger will not be with us. I will be with you through the presentation." Although they felt sorry a man of Preminger's stature had been dismissed for incompetence, they were relieved he was gone. When the show aired, Preminger introduced each act in a filmed segment, and he received sole credit as producer and director. It proved to be his first and last television venture.

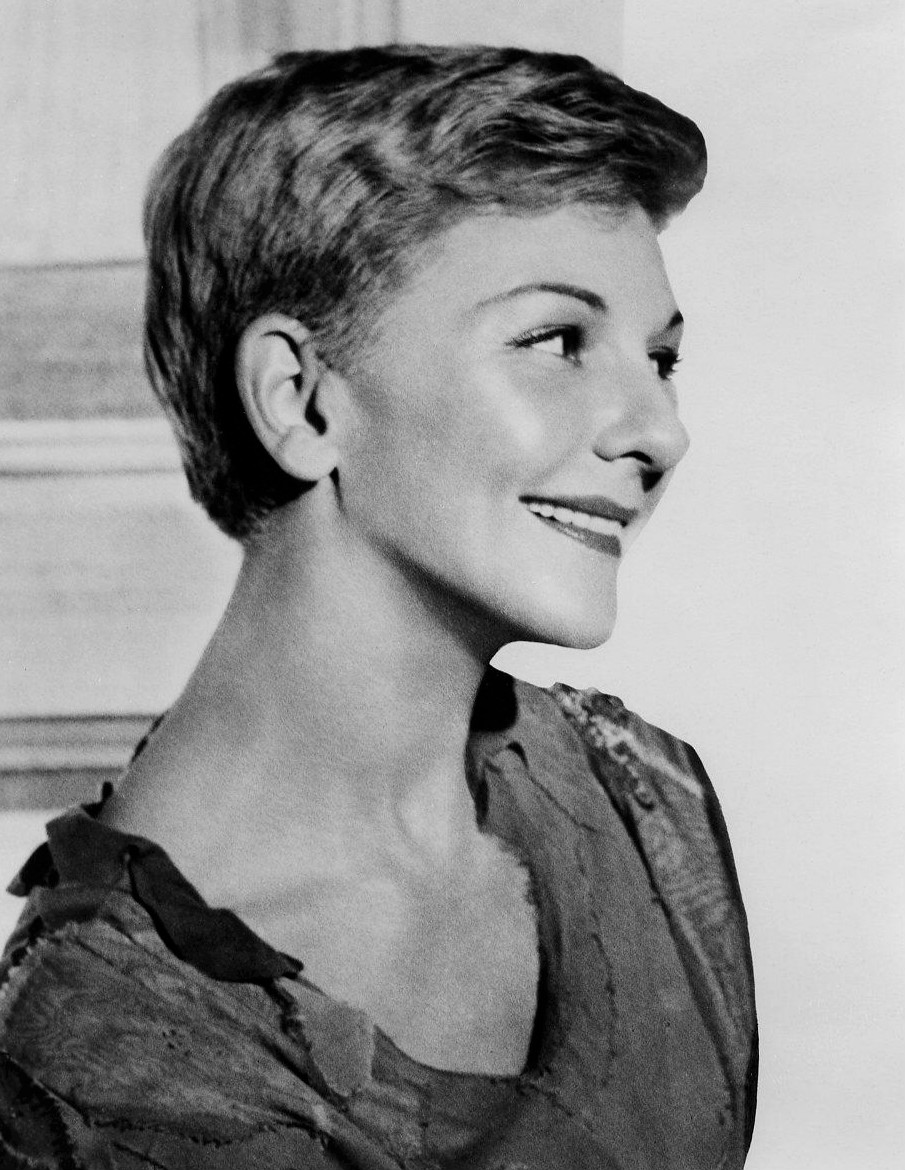
Mary Martin as Peter Pan

=== Peter Pan ===
One of the most memorable productions of the first season was telecast on March 7, 1955. Peter Pan, a recreation of the 1954 Broadway musical with all its original cast members, including Mary Martin as Peter Pan and Cyril Ritchard as Captain Hook, was so highly acclaimed by critics and well received by viewers, drawing the largest ratings for a single television program up to that time, that the program was restaged live with nearly the same cast in January 1956. A 1960 NBC revival of the production, first broadcast as a Christmas season special, was videotaped in color and later released on home video. By the time the 1960 version was made, the children had outgrown their roles and had to be replaced, but nearly all of the adult cast remained the same as those of the two earlier productions.

This production also marked the first time that any version of Peter Pan had been performed on television.

=== Notable appearances ===
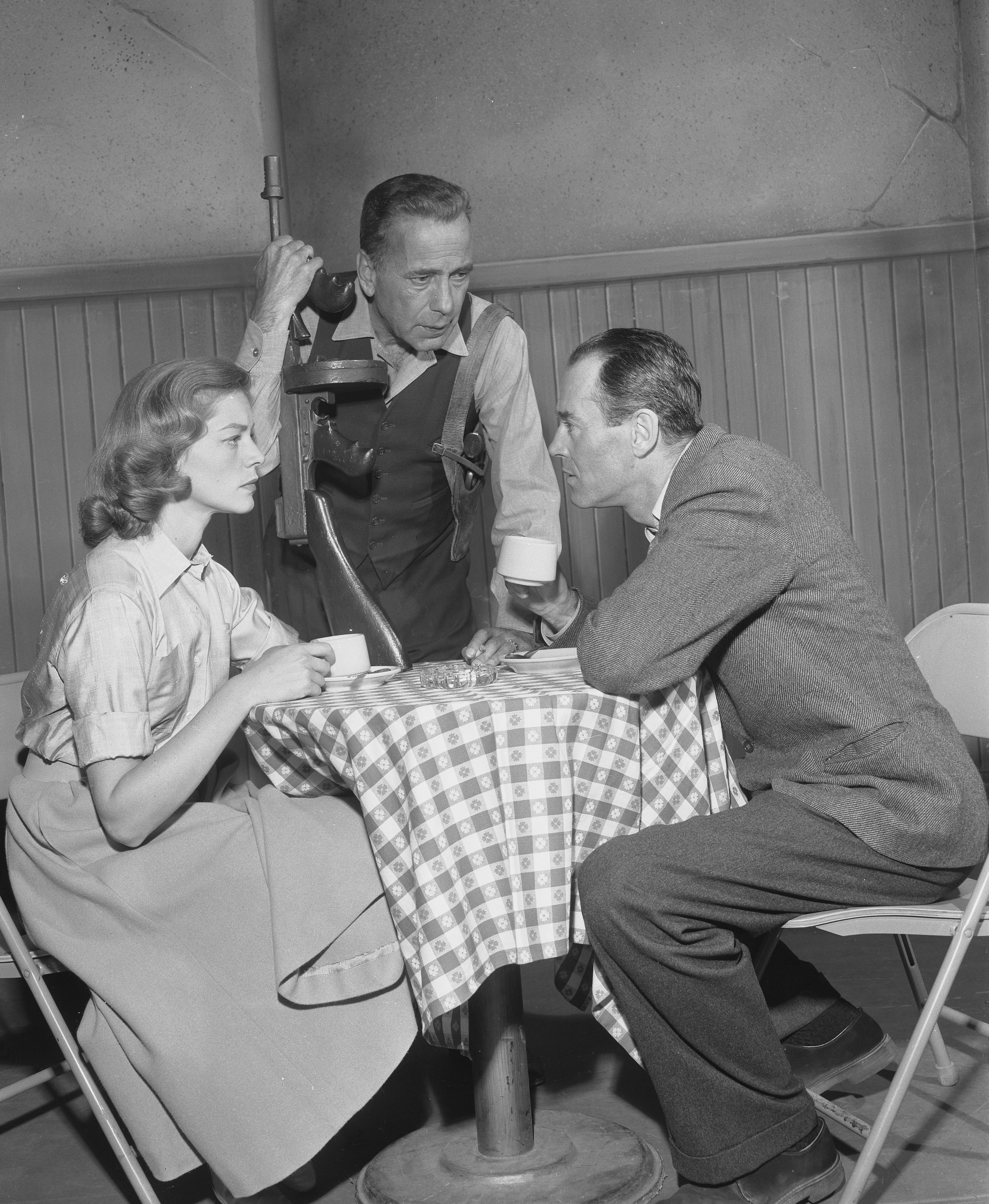
Lauren Bacall, Humphrey Bogart, and Henry Fonda rehearsing The Petrified Forest (1955)

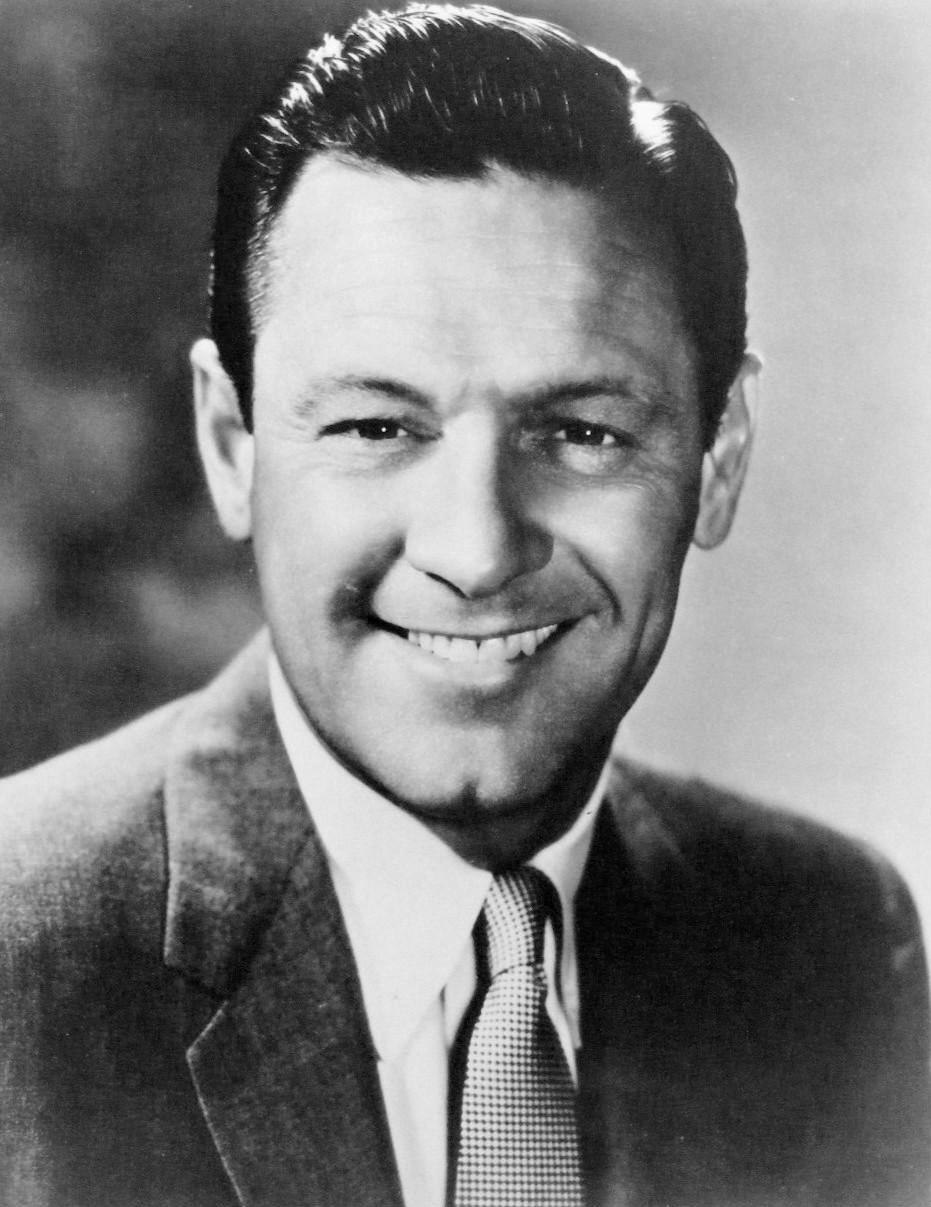
William Holden in Dateline II (1955)

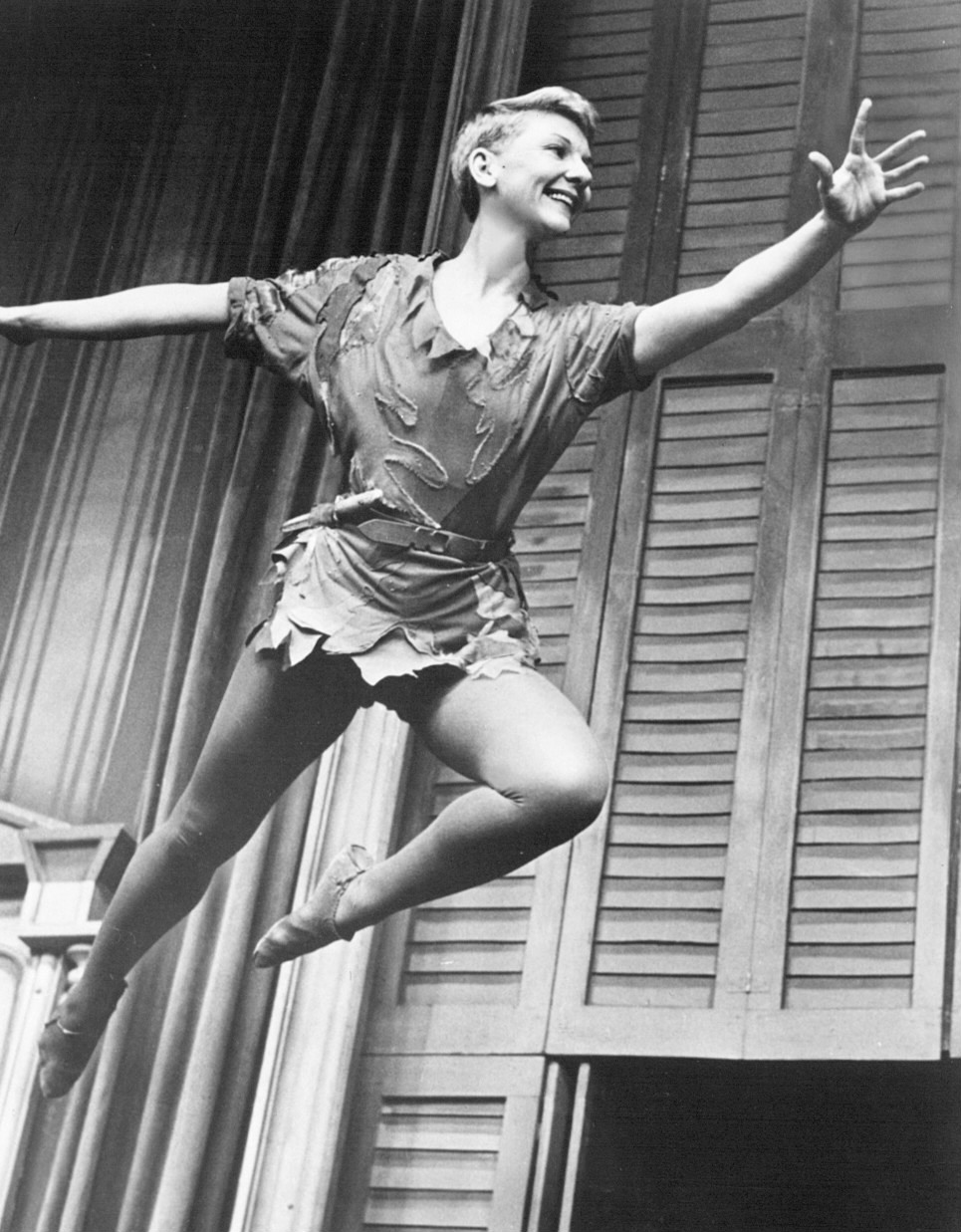
Mary Martin in Peter Pan (1956)

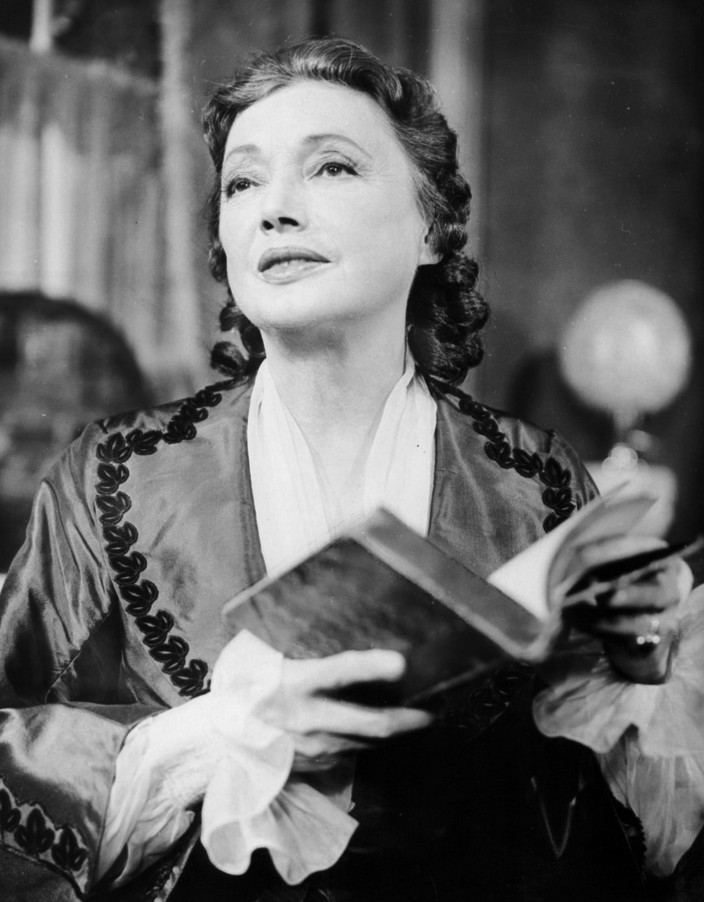
Katharine Cornell in The Barretts of Wimpole Street (1956)

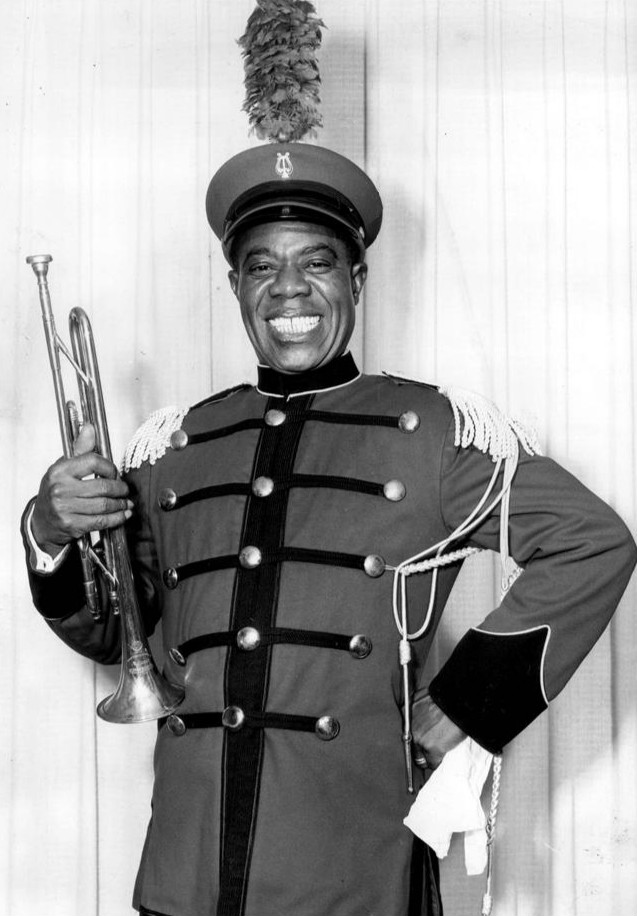
Louis Armstrong in The Lord Don't Play Favorites (1956)

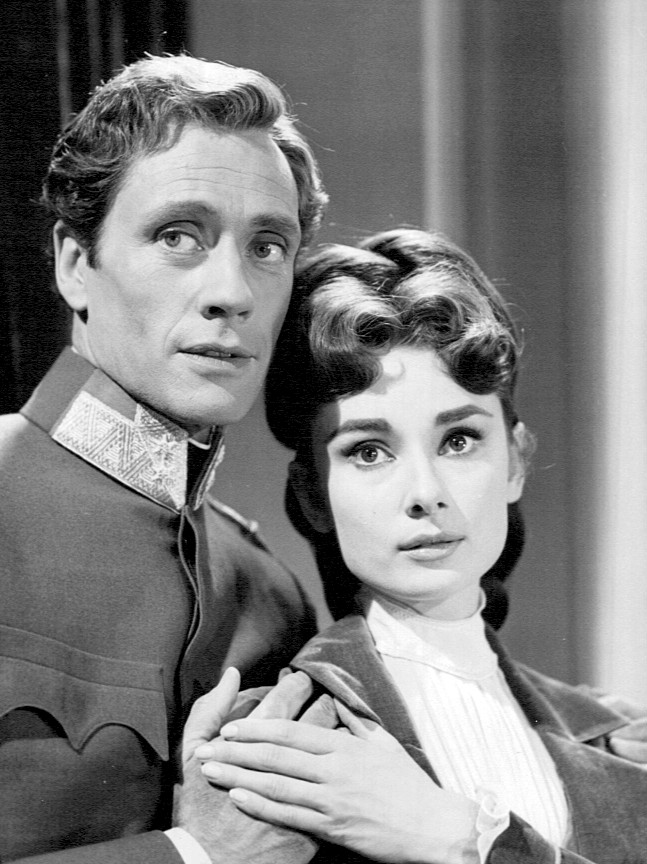
Mel Ferrer and Audrey Hepburn in Mayerling (1957)

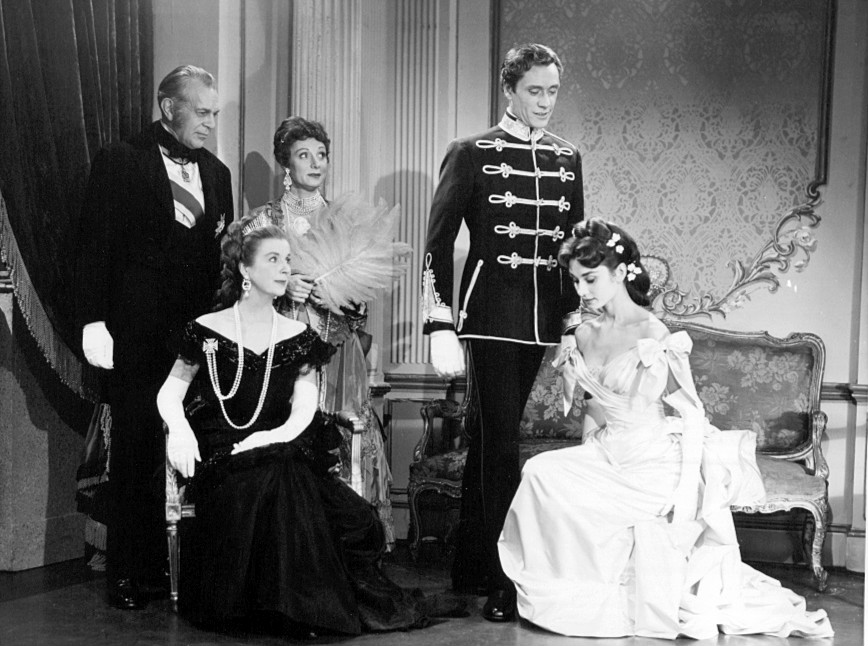
Raymond Massey, Diana Wynyard (seated), Judith Evelyn, Mel Ferrer, and Audrey Hepburn in Mayerling (1957)

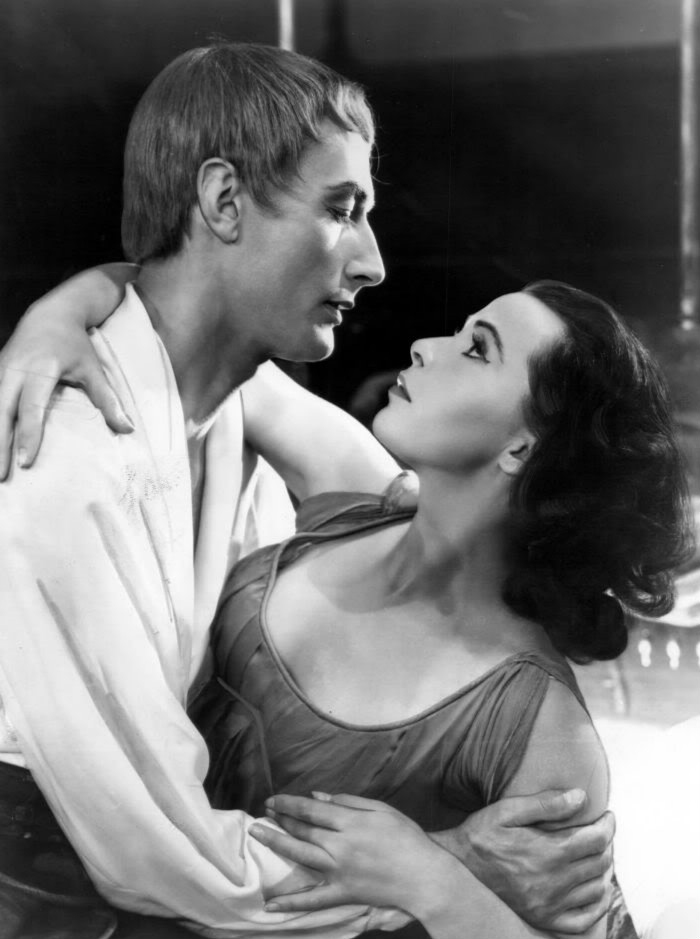
John Neville and Claire Bloom in Romeo and Juliet (1957)

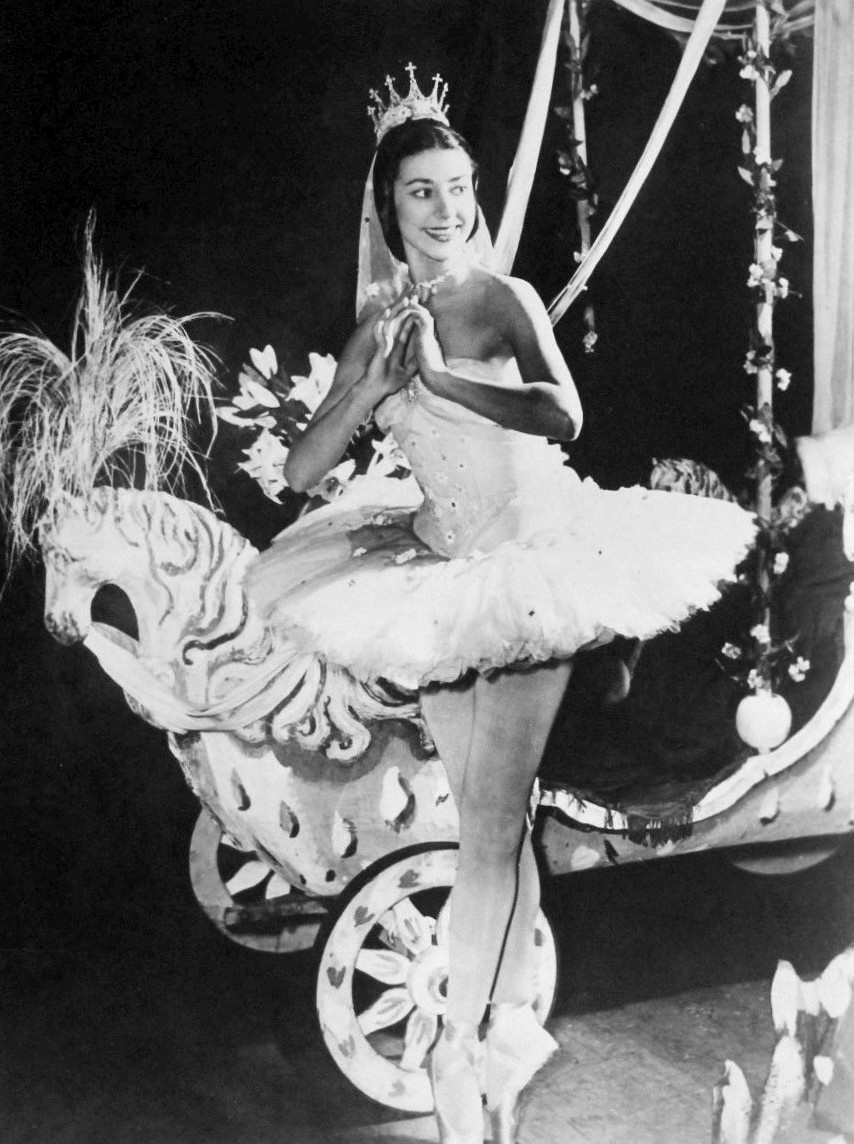
Margot Fonteyn in Cinderella (1957)

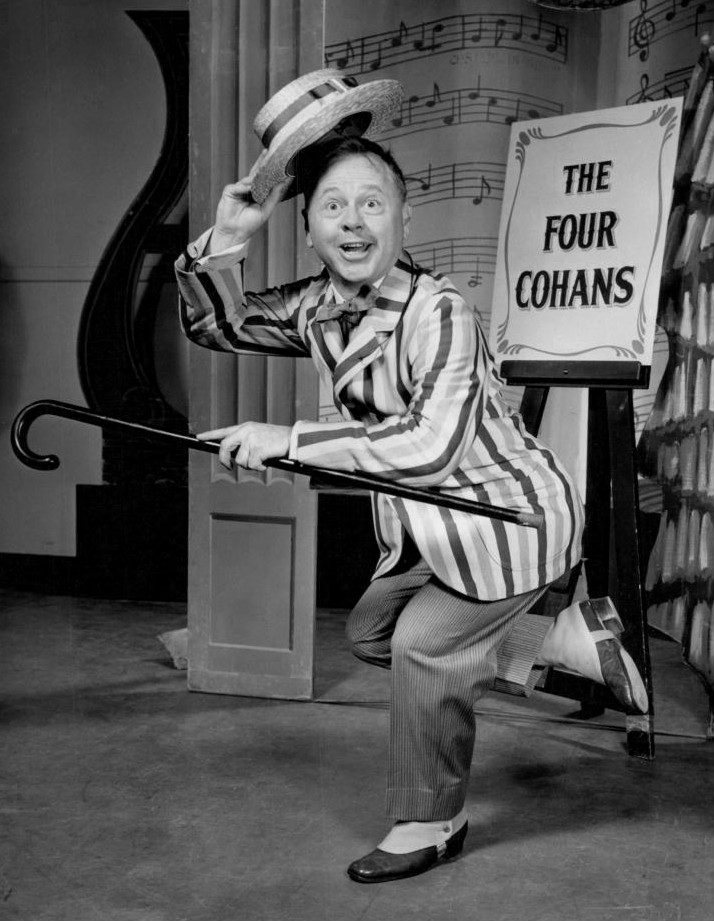
Mickey Rooney in Mr. Broadway (1957)
- Humphrey Bogart and Lauren Bacall made their television debuts in a production of The Petrified Forest that also starred Henry Fonda, Jack Warden, and Jack Klugman. Bogart reprised the role of Duke Mantee, which he performed in the original 1935 Broadway production and the 1936 film. Fonda portrayed Leslie Howard's original role and Bacall played the Bette Davis part.
- Director William Wyler made his television debut with The Letter, starring Siobhán McKenna, John Mills, Michael Rennie, and Anna May Wong. Wyler also directed the 1940 feature film.
- Director Anatole Litvak made his television debut with Mayerling, starring Audrey Hepburn and Mel Ferrer. Litvak also directed the 1936 feature film.
- A musical adaptation of Thornton Wilder's Our Town starring Frank Sinatra, Eva Marie Saint and Paul Newman (a replacement for the preferred James Dean). Sinatra, who plays a warbling version of the stage manager and clocks the most screen time, scored a major chart hit with the original song "Love and Marriage," which received an Emmy Award. The songs were written by Jimmy van Heusen and Sammy Cahn in the first of their many collaborations.
- In her television debut, although she was now too old for the role, Katharine Cornell recreated her original stage role as Elizabeth Barrett Browning in The Barretts of Wimpole Street, with Anthony Quayle as Robert Browning.
- Husband and wife Hume Cronyn and Jessica Tandy reprised the roles they had played in the Broadway production of The Fourposter.
- Ruth Hussey, Paulette Goddard, and Mary Boland were cast in the acerbic comedy The Women. Hussey and Goddard played different characters in the 1939 MGM film; Boland reprised her role as the Countess deLave.

=== Additional productions ===
- The ballets The Sleeping Beauty (by Tchaikovsky) and Cinderella (by Prokofiev), both with Margot Fonteyn and Michael Somes marked the first time these two ballets had ever been broadcast on television.
- A staging of Sidney Howard's 1934 adaptation of the 1929 Sinclair Lewis novel Dodsworth, starring Fredric March, Claire Trevor and Geraldine Fitzgerald
- The Skin of Our Teeth with Helen Hayes and Mary Martin
- Cyrano de Bergerac, with José Ferrer (recreating his award-winning stage and film role), Claire Bloom, and Christopher Plummer (a future Cyrano himself)
- The Great Sebastians, directed by Franklin J. Schaffner with Lynn Fontanne, Alfred Lunt and Alan Furlan, was set in 1948 in Communist-controlled Prague, Czechoslovakia. A mind-reading act is commanded by the authorities to entertain at a private party. They discover what the authorities really want is for them to use their "powers" to expose spies and traitors to the regime. Realizing the kind of trouble they are in for, they decide to escape using their best stage tricks.
- Shakespeare's Romeo and Juliet, with Claire Bloom, John Neville, and Paul Rogers
- Festival of Music, two 90-minute programs, were devoted to classical music, featuring such performers as Jan Peerce, Arthur Rubinstein, Roberta Peters, Andrés Segovia, Jussi Björling, tenor Thomas Hayward, Boris Christoff, Isaac Stern, Leonard Warren, Zinka Milanov, Risë Stevens, and Renata Tebaldi. Most of these classical artists (except for Roberta Peters, who had appeared on George Jessel's show, and Leonard Warren, who had sung Iago in the historic 1948 first complete telecast of Verdi's Otello) were appearing on commercial American network television for the first time. The programs were hosted respectively by Charles Laughton and José Ferrer.
- The final episode, "Festival of Magic", featured Ernie Kovacs playing host to magicians from the United States, England, South Africa, Ireland, India, France, and China.

=== Wide Wide World ===
Producers' Showcase served as the springboard for the live documentary series Wide Wide World. Conceived by network head Pat Weaver and hosted by Dave Garroway, the show was introduced on Showcase on June 27, 1955. The premiere episode, featuring entertainment from the United States, Canada, and Mexico, was the first international North American telecast in the history of the medium. It received a regular Sunday afternoon time slot the following October.

== Episodes ==
These 37 episodes comprise the Producers' Showcase library:

#	Date	Title	Director	Selected Cast
1	Oct. 18, 1954	Tonight at 8.30	Otto Preminger	Ginger Rogers, Martyn Green, Trevor Howard
2	Nov. 15, 1954	State of the Union	Arthur Penn	Joseph Cotten, Margaret Sullavan
3	Dec. 13, 1954	Dateline	Alan Handley	John Daly (host)
4	Jan. 7, 1955	Call to Freedom		Alexander Scourby (narrator), Martha Mödl
5	Jan. 10, 1955	Yellow Jack	Delbert Mann	Broderick Crawford as Walter Reed
6	Feb. 7, 1955	The Women	Vincent J. Donehue	Ruth Hussey, Shelley Winters
7	March 7, 1955	Peter Pan	Clark Jones	Mary Martin, Cyril Ritchard
8	April 4, 1955	Reunion in Vienna	Vincent J. Donehue	Greer Garson, Brian Aherne
9	April 4, 1955	The King and Mrs. Candle	Arthur Penn	Cyril Ritchard, Joan Greenwood
10	May 2, 1955	Darkness at Noon	Delbert Mann	Lee J. Cobb
11	May 30, 1955	The Petrified Forest	Delbert Mann	Humphrey Bogart, Henry Fonda, Lauren Bacall
12	June 27, 1955	Wide Wide World	Dick Schneider	Dave Garroway (host)
13	July 25, 1955	The Fourposter	Clark Jones	Hume Cronyn, Jessica Tandy
14	Sept. 11, 1955	The Skin of Our Teeth	Vincent J. Donehue	Mary Martin, Helen Hayes
15	Sept. 19, 1955	Our Town	Delbert Mann	Paul Newman, Eva Marie Saint, Frank Sinatra
16	Oct. 17, 1955	Cyrano de Bergerac	Kirk Browning	José Ferrer, Claire Bloom
17	Nov. 15, 1955	Dateline II	Alan Handley	John Wayne, Peggy Lee
18	Dec. 14, 1955	The Sleeping Beauty	Clark Jones	Margot Fonteyn, Michael Somes
19	Jan. 3, 1956	Peter Pan	Clark Jones	Mary Martin, Cyril Ritchard
20	Jan. 30, 1956	Festival of Music	Kirk Browning	Charles Laughton (host)
21	Feb. 28, 1956	Bloomer Girl	Alex Segal	Barbara Cook, Keith Andes
22	March 5, 1956	Caesar and Cleopatra	Kirk Browning	Cedric Hardwicke, Claire Bloom
23	April 2, 1956	The Barretts of Wimpole Street	Vincent J. Donehue	Katharine Cornell, Anthony Quayle
24	April 30, 1956	Dodsworth	Alex Segal	Fredric March, Claire Trevor
25	June 25, 1956	Happy Birthday	Alex Segal	Betty Field, Barry Nelson
26	July 23, 1956	Rosalinda	Bob Banner	Cyril Ritchard, Jean Fenn
27	Sept. 17, 1956	The Lord Don't Play Favorites	Clark Jones	Louis Armstrong, Buster Keaton, Kay Starr
28	Oct. 15, 1956	The Letter	William Wyler	Siobhán McKenna, John Mills
29	Nov. 12, 1956	Jack and the Beanstalk	Clark Jones	Billy Gilbert, Joel Grey
30	Dec. 10, 1956	Festival of Music II	Kirk Browning	José Ferrer (host)
31	Feb. 3, 1957	Ruggles of Red Gap	Clark Jones	Garry Moore (host), Michael Redgrave, Peter Lawford
32	Feb. 4, 1957	Mayerling	Anatole Litvak	Audrey Hepburn, Mel Ferrer
33	March 4, 1957	Romeo and Juliet	Clark Jones	Claire Bloom, John Neville
34	April 1, 1957	The Great Sebastians	Franklin J. Schaffner	Alfred Lunt, Lynn Fontanne
35	April 29, 1957	Cinderella	Clark Jones	Margot Fonteyn, Michael Somes
36	May 11, 1957	Mr. Broadway	Sidney Lumet	Mickey Rooney as George M. Cohan
37	May 27, 1957	Festival of Magic	Charles S. Dubin	Ernie Kovacs (host)

== Reception ==
Producers' Showcase averaged a 36.5 percent audience share. Sixty-five million viewers watched the first presentation of Peter Pan, garnering a 68.3 audience share that made it the highest-rated episode in the series. The restaged Peter Pan earned a 54.9 share; and The Petrified Forest earned a 50.6 share. The series had this level of success even though its last third aired opposite I Love Lucy, the highest or second-highest rated series on television during the three seasons Producers' Showcase was broadcast.

=== Awards ===
Presenters' Showcase received the following awards and nominations from the Academy of Television Arts & Sciences.

Primetime Emmy Awards
Year	Category	Recipient	Outcome
1956	Best Actress – Single Role	Mary Martin, Peter Pan	Won
1956	Best Art Direction – Live Series	Otis Riggs	Won
1956	Best Dramatic Series	Producers' Showcase	Won
1956	Best Musical Contribution	Sammy Cahn and Jimmy Van Heusen, "Love and Marriage" (song), Our Town	Won
1956	Best Producer – Live Series	Fred Coe	Won
1956	Best Single Program of the Year	Peter Pan	Won
1956	Best Actor – Single Performance	José Ferrer, Cyrano de Bergerac	Nominated
1956	Best Actor in a Supporting Role	Cyril Ritchard, Peter Pan	Nominated
1956	Best Actress – Single Role	Eva Marie Saint, Our Town	Nominated
1956	Best Actress – Single Role	Jessica Tandy, The Fourposter	Nominated
1956	Best Choreographer	Jerome Robbins, Peter Pan	Nominated
1956	Best Director – Live Series	Clark Jones, Peter Pan	Nominated
1956	Best Director – Live Series	Delbert Mann, Our Town	Nominated
1956	Best Musical Contribution	Sammy Cahn and Jimmy Van Heusen, Our Town	Nominated
1956	Best Musical Contribution	Nelson Riddle, Our Town	Nominated
1956	Best Single Program of the Year	The Sleeping Beauty	Nominated
1956	Best Television Adaptation	David Shaw, Our Town	Nominated
1957	Best Single Performance by an Actress	Claire Trevor, Dodsworth	Won
1957	Best Live Camera Work	Producers' Showcase	Nominated
1957	Best Single Performance by an Actor	Fredric March, Dodsworth	Nominated

== Home media ==
Video Artists International has formed joint ventures with Showcase Productions, Inc. for the release of a number of Producers' Showcase programs, as well as Showcase programs from other "Golden Age of Television" series, complete with their commercial announcements, on DVD: Festival of Music (#4244), Festival of Music II (#4245), The Sleeping Beauty (#4295) and Cinderella (#4296). Although these episodes were broadcast live and in color, the kinescope process by which they were preserved is black-and-white.
