= Meet Mr. Callaghan (play) =

1952 play

- Written by: Gerald Verner
- Original language: English
- Genre: Thriller
- Setting: Slim Callaghan's office, Chancery Lane, London

Premiere
- Date premiered: 23 February 1952
- Place premiered: Kings Theatre, Southsea

Meet Mr. Callaghan is a 1952 crime thriller play by the British writer Gerald Verner. It was adapted from the novel The Urgent Hangman by Peter Cheyney featuring the private detective Slim Callaghan. It premiered at the Kings Theatre in Southsea before transferring to the Garrick Theatre in London's West End where it ran for 340 performances between 27 May 1952 and 4 April 1953. The cast included Terence De Marney as Callaghan, Larry Burns, Jack Allen, Trevor Reid, John Longden, Lisa Daniels, Harriette Johns and Simone Silva. In 1953 Verner wrote another stage play featuring Callaghan, Dangerous Curves based on Cheyney's novel of the same title.

== Film adaptation ==
In 1954 it was adapted into a film of the same title directed by Charles Saunders. The title role was played by Terence De Marney's brother Derrick De Marney with a cast that also featured Adrienne Corri, Delphi Lawrence, Belinda Lee as well as several actors reprising their roles from the stage version.

== Bibliography ==
- Clinton, Franz Anthony. British Thrillers, 1950-1979: 845 Films of Suspense, Mystery, Murder and Espionage. McFarland, 2020.
- Kabatchnik, Amnon. Blood on the Stage, 1950-1975: Milestone Plays of Crime, Mystery, and Detection. Scarecrow Press, 2011.
- Wearing, J.P. The London Stage 1950–1959: A Calendar of Productions, Performers, and Personnel. Rowman & Littlefield, 2014.
