= Dangerous Curves =

Dangerous Curves may refer to:

== Film ==
- Dangerous Curves (1929 film), an American circus film starring Clara Bow
- Dangerous Curves (1961 film), an Estonian comedy film
- Dangerous Curves (1988 film), an American comedy starring Tate Donovan
- Dangerous Curves (2000 film) or Stray Bullet II, an American-Irish action film

== Television ==
- "Dangerous Curves" (RuPaul's Drag U), an episode of RuPaul's Drag U
- "Dangerous Curves" (The Simpsons), a 2008 episode of The Simpsons
- Dangerous Curves (TV series), a 1990s American show in CBS's Crimetime After Primetime programming block
- Dangerous Curves, a 1999 A&E serial about Jayne Mansfield

== Other media ==
- Dangerous Curves (novel), a 1939 novel by the British writer Peter Cheyney
- Dangerous Curves (play), a 1953 play by Gerald Verner adapted from Cheyney's novel
- Dangerous Curves (video game), a 1995 racing game
- Dangerous Curves (album), a 1991 album by Lita Ford
- "Dangerous Curves", a 2003 song by King Crimson from The Power to Believe
- Dangerous Curves, a 2008 autobiography by Terri O'Connell
