= It Couldn't Matter Less =

1941 novel

- First edition
- Author: Peter Cheyney
- Language: English
- Series: Slim Callaghan
- Genre: Thriller
- Publisher: William Collins, Sons
- Publication date: 1941
- Publication place: United Kingdom
- Media type: Print
- Preceded by: You Can't Keep the Change
- Followed by: Sorry You've Been Troubled

It Couldn't Matter Less is a 1941 thriller novel by the British writer Peter Cheyney. It is the fourth in a series of novels featuring the London-based private detective Slim Callaghan who enjoyed a series of dangerous adventures similar in style to the hardboiled American detectives created by Raymond Chandler and Dashiell Hammett. It was published in the United States as Set-Up for Murder.

== Synopsis ==
Callaghan is persuaded by Inspector Gringall of Scotland Yard to meet with Doria Varette a torch singer in a nightclub. She hires Callaghan to look for her missing boyfriend Lionel Wilbery. Before long Callaghan realise he has got into a case that is far more complex than it first seems.

== Film adaptation ==
In 1955 it was adapted into the French film More Whiskey for Callaghan directed by Willy Rozier and starring Tony Wright, Magali Vendeuil and Robert Berri.

== Bibliography ==
- Goble, Alan. The Complete Index to Literary Sources in Film. Walter de Gruyter, 1999.
- Magill, Frank Northen. Critical Survey of Mystery and Detective Fiction: Authors, Volume 1. Salem Press, 1988.
