= Sorry You've Been Troubled (novel) =

1942 novel

- First edition
- Author: Peter Cheyney
- Language: English
- Series: Slim Callaghan
- Genre: Thriller
- Publisher: William Collins, Sons
- Publication date: 1942
- Publication place: United Kingdom
- Media type: Print
- Preceded by: It Couldn't Matter Less
- Followed by: They Never Say When

Sorry You've Been Troubled is a 1942 thriller novel by the British writer Peter Cheyney. It was the fifth book in his series featuring the hardboiled London-based private detective Slim Callaghan. It was published in the United States under the alternative title of Farewell to the Admiral.

== Synopsis ==
Callaghan barges into a case involving a £40,000 insurance claim following a suspicious-looking suicide, despite the fact that he doesn't represent any client.

== Film adaptation ==
It was made into a 1955 French film Your Turn, Callaghan directed by Willy Rozier and starring Tony Wright, Lysiane Rey and Colette Ripert.

== Bibliography ==
- Goble, Alan. The Complete Index to Literary Sources in Film. Walter de Gruyter, 1999.
- Magill, Frank Northen. Critical Survey of Mystery and Detective Fiction: Authors, Volume 1. Salem Press, 1988.
- Reilly, John M. Twentieth Century Crime & Mystery Writers. Springer, 2015.
- Server, Lee. Encyclopedia of Pulp Fiction Writers. Infobase Publishing, 2014.
