= Slim Callaghan =

Fictional private detective

Slim Callaghan is a fictional London-based private detective created by the writer Peter Cheyney. Like another of Cheyney's characters, the FBI agent Lemmy Caution, he was constructed as a British response to the more hardboiled detectives of American fiction such as Sam Spade and Philip Marlowe.

After making his debut in the 1938 novel The Urgent Hangman he featured in six further novels and a number of short stories. The novels were all bestsellers. The character has also appeared in a variety of film, television, radio and stage adaptations. The novels enjoyed particular popularity in France where actor Tony Wright played Callaghan in four film adaptations. Other actors to portray Callaghan include Michael Rennie, Derrick De Marney and Viktor de Kowa who played him in the 1964 German television series Slim Callaghan Intervenes. Two West End stage versions in the early 1950s Meet Mr. Callaghan and Dangerous Curves by Gerald Verner starred Terence De Marney.

Operating out of an office in Mayfair's Berkeley Square he frequently encounters attractive, but deceitful femmes fatales. Callaghan has been described as a "suave, handsome, resourceful, Mayfair-based private detective who is Irish – the nationality was perhaps a tease for Cheyney's patriotic critics".

== Novels ==
- The Urgent Hangman (1938)
- Dangerous Curves (1939)
- You Can't Keep the Change (1940)
- It Couldn't Matter Less (1941)
- Sorry You've Been Troubled (1942)
- They Never Say When (1944)
- Uneasy Terms (1946)

== Movies ==
- Uneasy Terms (1948) played by Michael Rennie
- Meet Mr. Callaghan (1954) played by Derrick De Marney
- Your Turn, Callaghan (1955) played by Tony Wright
- More Whiskey for Callaghan (1955) played by Tony Wright
- Callaghan remet ça (1961) played by Tony Wright

== Stage plays ==
- Meet Mr. Callaghan (1952)
- Dangerous Curves (1953)

== Television series ==
- Slim Callaghan Intervenes (1964)

== Bibliography ==
- Goble, Alan. The Complete Index to Literary Sources in Film. Walter de Gruyter, 1999.
- Harrison, Michael. Peter Cheyney, Prince of Hokum: A Biography. N. Spearman, 1954
- James, Russell. Great British Fictional Detectives. Remember When, 21 Apr 2009.
- Knight, Stephen. Crime Fiction Since 1800: Detection, Death, Diversity. Macmillan, 2010.
