= Uncle Silas (film) =

1947 British film by Charles Frank

- British Theatrical poster
- Directed by: Charles Frank
- Written by: Ben Travers, from the novel by Sheridan le Fanu
- Produced by: Josef Somlo, Laurence Irving
- Starring: Jean Simmons; Derrick de Marney; Katina Paxinou
- Cinematography: Robert Krasker
- Edited by: Ralph Kemplen
- Music by: Alan Rawsthorne, played by the London Symphony Orchestra, conducted by Muir Mathieson
- Production company: Two Cities Films
- Distributed by: General Film Distributors
- Release date: 8 October 1947
- Running time: 103 minutes
- Country: United Kingdom
- Language: English
- Budget: over $1 million or £366,300
- Box office: £96,400 or US$269,920 (by Dec 1949) or £82,700

Uncle Silas (US: The Inheritance) is a 1947 British drama film directed by Charles Frank and starring Jean Simmons, Katina Paxinou and Derrick De Marney. It was written by Ben Travers, adapted from J. Sheridan Le Fanu's 1864 novel Uncle Silas, in which an heiress is pursued by her uncle, who craves her money following her father's death.

== Plot ==
Caroline Ruthyn is the teenage niece of her elderly uncle Silas, a sickly and at one time unbalanced rake who becomes her guardian on the death of her father. The fact that Silas is broke and greedy and young Caroline is the heir to her father's vast fortune is reason enough for Caroline to be wary, but her fears increase when she meets Silas's brutal son, her cousin, and when she discovers that her fearsome former governess, Madame de la Rougierre, is working with her uncle...

== Cast ==
- Jean Simmons as Caroline Ruthyn
- Katina Paxinou as Madame de la Rougierre
- Derrick De Marney as Uncle Silas
- Derek Bond as Lord Richard Ilbury
- Sophie Stewart as Lady Monica Waring
- Esmond Knight as Doctor Bryerly
- Reginald Tate as Austin Ruthyn
- Manning Whiley as Dudley Ruthyn
- Marjorie Rhodes as Mrs Rusk
- John Laurie as Giles
- Frederick Burtwell as Branston
- George Curzon as Sleigh
- O. B. Clarence as Victor Clay
- Frederick Ranalow as Rigg
- Patricia Glyn as Mary Quince
- Robin Netscher as Tom Hawkes
- Guy Rolfe as Sepulchre Hawkes

== Production ==
The film was shot at Denham Studios with sets by the art director Ralph Brinton. The costumes were designed by Elizabeth Haffenden.

== Reception ==
=== Box office ===
The film was a box office flop. Producer's receipts were £70,500 in the UK and £12,200 overseas.

=== Critical ===
The Monthly Film Bulletin wrote: "The film, though it has its gripping moments, is spoilt by its over-melodramatic ones which cause ominous titters. Jean Simmons as Caroline struggles to bring realism to her part, but as she has to appear to be completely unaware of her uncle's true character, despite some very obvious signs of it, it is impossible for her to do more than struggle gamely with the material at her disposal. There is not enough depth to Derrick de Marney's characterisation of the name part, and he only skims the surface of what could have been a sinister and interesting role."

Kine Weekly wrote: "Crutch-propelled 'blood and thunder,' set in the early 'eighties. It starts out to thrill, but its purpose is defeated by a laboured script, uninspired direction and players who grossly overact. In the end, hoary macabre is reduced to laughter. ... Jean Simmons makes the most of a stagey part as the frightened Caroline, but Derrick de Marney might well be mistaken for Charley's Aunt as Uncle and Katina Paxinou is much too heavy-handed as Madame De La Rougierre ... The staging and photography are very good, but effective technical presentation fails to cloak the crude, old-fashioned plot or the overacting.

Picturegoer wrote: "Jean Simmons is wasted as the heroine who is nearly terrified to death in the final sequences, while Derrick De Marney cuts almost a comic figure as the uncle. Even Katina Paxinou as a hard-drinking Frenchwoman over-emphasizes. In fact the whole cast seems to be thinking in terms of 'ham.' The camera work and staging is extremely good. It's a pity that it has been wasted on such dull hokum. Tod Slaughter could have done much better than this."

Variety wrote: "Only excuse for this blood-and-thunder meller appears to have been the desire to screen what is alleged to be one of the first thrillers. That Sheridan le Fanu's novel is still in public demand probably explains why over $1,000,000 was spent on a yarn that should have been allowed to stay on the shelf."
