= La nuit est à nous =

La nuit est à nous may refer to:

- The Night Is Ours (1930 film), a German drama film
- The Night Is Ours (1953 film), a French drama film
