= Henry Djanik =

French actor (1926–2008)

- Born: Arthur Djanikian; March 21, 1926; Varna
- Died: August 18, 2008 (aged 82); Le Perreux-sur-Marne
- Other names: Henri Djanick, H. Djanik, Henri Djanik, Djannik
- Occupation: Actor
- Years active: 1952-1997

Henry Djanik (1926–2008) was a French actor.

== Partial filmography ==
- Manina, the Girl in the Bikini (1952) - Marcel - le second d'Éric
- The Adventurer of Chad (1953)
- This Man Is Dangerous (1953) - William Bosco
- La soupe à la grimace (1954) - Pépito
- Pas de coup dur pour Johnny (1955)
- Les 3 font la paire (1957) - Bébert
- Live Fast, Die Young (1958) - Sacha
- Les gros bras (1964) - Kramil - le jouer de poker (uncredited)
- Living It Up (1966)
- Le grand bidule (1967) - Le président de Royal Benzine
- Tintin et le temple du soleil (1969) - Un bandit sur le bateau (voice)
- Biribi (1971) - Salpierri
- Q (1974) - Le chauffeur de Florence
- Fear Over the City (1975) - Un inspecteur de police
- La chatte sur un doigt brûlant (1975) - L'archevêque
- Et si tu n'en veux pas (1976)
- La situation est grave... mais pas désespérée (1976)
- I as in Icarus (1979) - Nick Farnese
- Memoirs of a French Whore (1979)
- Les Maîtres du temps (1982) - Un soldat (voice)
- Haltéroflic (1983) - Le récitant (voice)
- Et nous serons heureux... (1984) - Henri
- Le voleur de feuilles (1984) - Le turfiste
- Le Big-Bang (1987) - Dark Vador (voice)
- 588 rue Paradis (1992)
- Les mille et une farces de Pif et Hercule (1993) - Gorille (voice)
