= The Urgent Hangman =

1938 thriller novel by Peter Cheyney

- First edition image (UK & US)
- Author: Peter Cheyney
- Language: English
- Series: Slim Callaghan
- Genre: Thriller
- Publisher: William Collins, Sons (UK); Dodd, Mead & Company (US)
- Publication date: 1938
- Publication place: United Kingdom
- Media type: Print
- Pages: 230
- ISBN: 1471901599
- Followed by: Dangerous Curves

The Urgent Hangman is a 1938 thriller novel by the British writer Peter Cheyney. It introduced the fictional London-based private detective Slim Callaghan, the first in a series of seven novels as well as two short story collections.

== Adaptations ==
In 1952 it was adapted for the stage by Gerald Verner as Meet Mr. Callaghan and ran for 340 performances at the Garrick Theatre in London's West End. The play was in turn adapted for the 1954 film Meet Mr. Callaghan directed by Charles Saunders and starring Derrick De Marney and Adrienne Corri.

== Bibliography ==
- Reilly, John M. Twentieth Century Crime & Mystery Writers. Springer, 2015. p. 300. ISBN 0312824181. OL 4437992M.
