= Attempt to Kill =

1961 British film by Royston Morley

- Theatrical poster
- Directed by: Royston Morley
- Written by: Richard Harris
- Based on: The Lone House Mystery by Edgar Wallace
- Produced by: Jack Greenwood; Jim O'Connolly
- Starring: Derek Farr; Tony Wright; Richard Pearson; Freda Jackson; Patricia Mort
- Cinematography: Bert Mason
- Edited by: Edward Jarvis
- Music by: Bernard Ebbinghouse
- Production company: Merton Park Studios
- Distributed by: Anglo-Amalgamated
- Release date: 23 October 1961
- Running time: 54 minutes
- Country: United Kingdom
- Language: English

Attempt to Kill is a 1961 British second feature ('B') film directed by Royston Morley and starring Derek Farr and Tony Wright. The screenplay was by Richard Harris, based on the 1929 Edgar Wallace novel The Lone House Mystery. It is part of the series of Edgar Wallace Mysteries films made at Merton Park Studios from 1960 to 1965.

== Plot ==
A businessman fires one of his employees, then someone tries to murder him. The fired man becomes the prime suspect.

== Cast ==
- Derek Farr as Detective Inspector Minter
- Tony Wright as Gerry Hamilton
- Richard Pearson as Frank Weyman
- Freda Jackson as Mrs. Weyman
- Patricia Mort as Elisabeth Gray
- J.G. Devlin as Elliott
- Clifford Earl as Sergeant Bennett
- Denis Holmes as Fraser
- Allan Jeager as gardener
- Grace Arnold as housekeeper
- Trevor Reid as bank manager
- Frances Bennett as barmaid

== Production ==
Filming took place at Merton Park in June 1960.

== Reception ==
The Monthly Film Bulletin wrote: "Derek Farr's resourceful performance as the Inspector, and the Thames setting, are the only assets in this unoriginal Edgar Wallace thriller."

Kinematograph Weekly called it "a good British second."
