= The Whispering Woman =

1949 novel

- Author: Gerald Verner
- Language: English
- Series: Superintendent Budd
- Genre: Mystery
- Publisher: Wright and Brown
- Publication date: 1949
- Publication place: United Kingdom
- Media type: Print

The Whispering Woman is a 1949 mystery thriller novel by the British author Gerald Verner. It was part of his series featuring Superintendent Budd. A young cinema cashier is handed a threatening note by her sister who had received it from by a mysterious woman. Shortly afterwards the cashier is shot dead from behind.

== Film adaptation ==
In 1953 it served as the basis for the film Noose for a Lady directed by Wolf Rilla and starring Dennis Price, Rona Anderson and Ronald Howard.

== Bibliography ==
- Enser, A.G.S. Filmed Books and Plays: A List of Books and Plays from which Films Have Been Made, 1928-1974, Volume 1. Lexington Books, 1975.
- Goble, Alan. The Complete Index to Literary Sources in Film. Walter de Gruyter, 1999.
- Hubin, Allen J. Crime Fiction, 1749-1980: A Comprehensive Bibliography. Garland Publishing, 1984.
