= Viktor de Kowa =

German actor

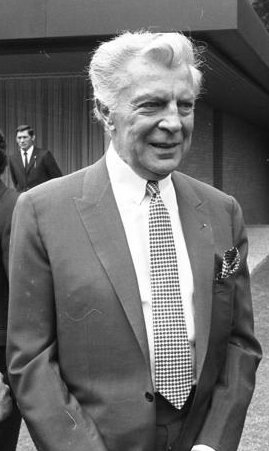
- Viktor de Kowa in 1971
- Born: Victor Paul Karl Kowarzik; 8 March 1904; Hohkirch, Silesia, German Empire
- Died: 8 April 1973 (aged 69); West Berlin, West Germany
- Resting place: Waldfriedhof Heerstrasse, Berlin, Germany
- Occupations: Film and theatre actor, singer, director, writer
- Years active: 1922–1973
- Spouse(s): Ursula Grabley (1926–41); Michiko Tanaka (1941–73; his death)

Signature
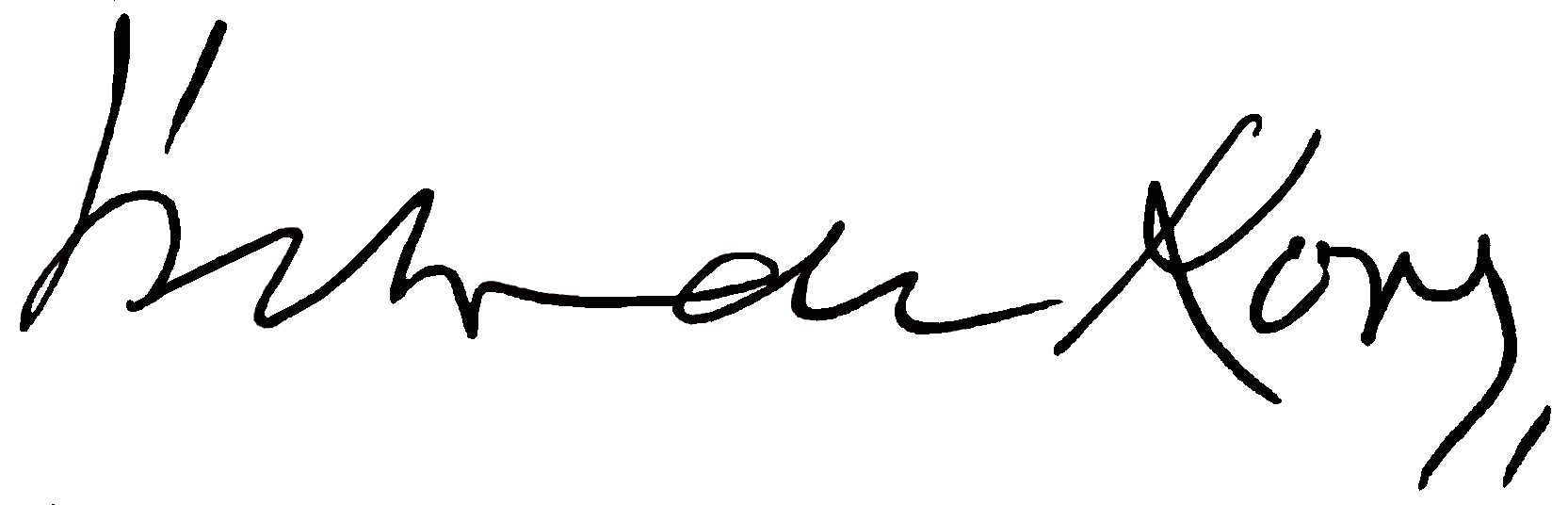

Viktor de Kowa (also spelled Victor de Kowa, born Victor Paul Karl Kowalczyk; 8 March 1904 – 8 April 1973) was a German stage and film actor, chanson singer, director, narrator, and comic poet.

== Life ==
He was born the son of a farmer and engineer in Hohkirch near Görlitz (present-day Przesieczany in Poland), from where his family moved to Seifersdorf near Dippoldiswalde in Saxony in 1908 and to Chemnitz in 1913. De Kowa joined a cadet corps before he began occupational training as a graphic designer. Having attended drama classes with Erich Ponto, he made his acting debut at the Staatstheater Dresden in 1922. After appearances in Lübeck, Frankfurt and Hamburg, de Kowa entered the stages of the Volksbühne and the Deutsches Theater in Berlin, as well as of the Prussian State Theatre under Gustaf Gründgens.

He had a first small film appearance in Nils Olaf Chrisander's The Heart Thief in 1927 and subsequently became one of the leading comic actors of the UFA film industry. During the Third Reich he joined the Nazi Party, directing the propaganda movie Kopf hoch, Johannes! in 1941. The film idealized the education of the German youth in National Political Institutes of Education, which earned de Kowa an entry on the Gottbegnadeten list to evade his Wehrmacht conscription, though Minister Goebbels was disillusioned with his directing.

Despite his involvement in Nazi cinema, de Kowa's film and theatre career quickly proceeded after the war. In 1945 he became director of the Berlin Tribüne theatre and an ensemble member of the Vienna Burgtheater from 1956 to 1962. As chairman of the Arts Union, he was also a board director of the Confederation of German Trade Unions (DGB).

In 1964 he starred in the TV series Slim Callaghan Intervenes as Peter Cheyney's private detective Slim Callaghan.

== Personal life ==
First married to actress Ursula Grabley (1908–1977) in 1926, de Kowa was remarried in 1941 to Japanese singer and actress Michiko Tanaka (1909–1988). Both are buried in Friedhof Heerstraße, in an Ehrengrab donated by the City of Berlin.

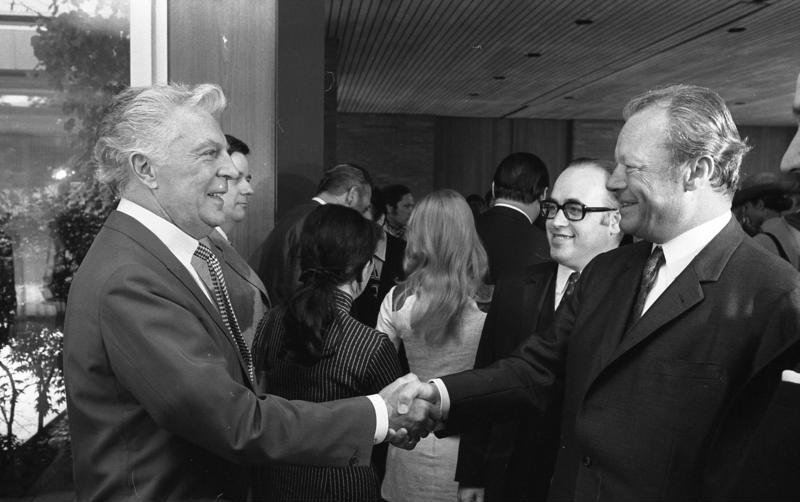
De Kowa received by Chancellor Willy Brandt, Bonn, 1971

== Selected filmography ==
- Katharina Knie (1929) - Lorenz Knie
- Pension Schöller (1930) - Bernhardy
- 1914 (1931) - Großfürst Michael
- Die Faschingsfee (1931) - Victor Ronai
- The True Jacob (1931) - James
- The Other Side (1931) - Leutnant Hibbert
- The Pride of Company Three (1932) - Leutnant Fritz Gernsbach
- The Invisible Front (1932) - Junger Mann im Selbstmörderklub
- Tannenberg (1932) - Rittmeister Fürst Wolgoff
- The Tsar's Diamond (1932) - Direktor Roller
- The Invisible Front (1933)
- The Marathon Runner (1933) - Georg Cornelius
- Typhoon (1933) - Charles Renard-Brinski
- Es war einmal ein Musikus (1933) - Heinz
- A Song Goes Round the World (1933) - Rigo
- Tell Me Who You Are (1933) - Frank Hesse
- Little Man, What Now? (1933) - Heilbutt
- Zwei im Sonnenschein (1933) - Paul
- The Castle in the South (1933) - Mirano
- Girls of Today (1933) - Peter Udde
- What Am I Without You (1934) - Heinrich Berger
- The Grand Duke's Finances (1934) - Grossherzog
- Pappi (1934) - Hans Werner
- Da stimmt was nicht (1934) - Baron Albrecht von Weiningen
- The Young Baron Neuhaus (1934) - Baron Neuhaus
- Decoy (1934) - Schott junior
- Ein Kind, ein Hund, ein Vagabund (1934) - Florian - ein Vagabund
- My Life for Maria Isabella (1935) - Fähnrich Menis
- Lärm um Weidemann (1935) - Dr. Hans Weidemann
- Die große und die kleine Welt (1936) - Franz Schuster - Taxichauffeur
- Scandal at the Fledermaus (1936) - Viktor Kendal
- Game on Board (1936) - Viktor Müller
- The Divine Jetta (1937) - Fritz Barsch
- Don't Promise Me Anything (1937) - Maler Martin Pratt
- Mit versiegelter Order (1938) - Willi Reinhardt
- Kleiner Mann - ganz groß! (1938) - Peter Kolle
- I Love You (1938) - Amerikaner Percy
- The Optimist (1938) - Gustl
- Scheidungsreise (1938) - Dr. Delius
- Wibbel the Tailor (1939, director)
- The Thing About Styx (1942) - Rittmeister Styx
- We Make Music (1942) - Paul Zimmermann
- An Old Heart Becomes Young Again (1943) - Neffe Dr. Paul Dehnhardt
- Ein glücklicher Mensch (1943) - Philipp, sein Sohn
- Das Leben geht weiter (1945) - Hauptmann Hoeßlin
- Peter Voss, Thief of Millions (1946) - Peter Voss
- Between Yesterday and Tomorrow (1947) - Michael Rott
- Intimitäten (1948) - Peter Korff
- Anonyme Briefe (1949)
- The Beautiful Galatea (1950) - Viktor Kolin
- Melody of Fate (1950)
- Scandal at the Embassy (1950) - Fred Corvin & Dr. Tamanyo
- The Blue Star of the South (1951) - Ivo
- The Prince of Pappenheim (1952) - Egon Fürst
- A Love Story (1954) - Manfred v. Prittwitz, Major
- Marriage Impostor (1954) - Professor Angelot
- Des Teufels General (1955) - SS-Gruppenführer Schmidt-Lausitz
- Heaven Is Never Booked Up (1955) - Professor Behrens
- Before God and Man (1955) - Martin
- Music in the Blood (1955) - Kurt Widmann
- The Girl from Flanders (1956) - Monsieur le Curé Simon / Dr.Simon
- Nichts als Ärger mit der Liebe (1956)
- Scampolo (1958) - Minister
- Embezzled Heaven (1958) - Theo
- Bombs on Monte Carlo (1960) - Minister
- Final Accord (1960) - Alexander von Berkin
- The Forger of London (1961) - Dr. Donald Wells
- It Can't Always Be Caviar (1961) - Loos
- This Time It Must Be Caviar (1961) - Loos
- The House in Montevideo (1963) - Anwalt
- Encounter in Salzburg (1964) - Bernhard von Wangen
- Winnetou and Old Firehand (1966) - Robert Ravenhurst

Trade union offices
Preceded by Heinrich Wüllner	President of the Arts Union; 1962–1966	Succeeded by Wolfgang Windgassen
