= More Whiskey for Callaghan =

1955 film

- Directed by: Willy Rozier
- Written by: Jacques Vilfrid; Willy Rozier
- Based on: It Couldn't Matter Less by Peter Cheyney
- Produced by: Willy Rozier
- Starring: Tony Wright; Magali Vendeuil; Robert Berri
- Cinematography: Michel Rocca
- Edited by: Madeleine Crétolle
- Music by: José Sentis; Jean Yatove
- Production company: Sport-Films
- Distributed by: Cocinor
- Release date: 7 December 1955
- Running time: 89 minutes
- Country: France
- Language: French

More Whiskey for Callaghan (French: Plus de whisky pour Callaghan) is a 1955 French thriller film directed by Willy Rozier and starring Tony Wright, Magali Vendeuil and Robert Berri. It is an adaptation of the 1941 novel It Couldn't Matter Less by British writer Peter Cheyney featuring the private detective Slim Callaghan. It was the second film featuring English actor Wright as Callaghan following Your Turn, Callaghan.

== Premise ==
Slim Callaghan investigates the theft of documents from a British laboratory. This leads him to the Côte d’Azurwhere he decides to infiltrate a network of aristocratic spies.

== Cast ==
- Tony Wright as Slim Callaghan
- Magali Vendeuil as Doria Varette
- Robert Berri as Comte Haragos
- Jean-Max as Commodore Schoubersky
- Diana Bel as Irania Trasmonti
- Mario David as Amédée
- Joé Davray as Inspecteur Vadet
- Michel Etcheverry as Prof. Ephraim Ponticollo
- Manuéla De Ségovia as La Montalban
- Christiane Barry as Comtesse Haragos
- Robert Burnier as Nicholls
- Fernand Rauzéna as Gonzalès
- Frédéric O'Brady as Souvaroff

== Bibliography ==
- Goble, Alan. The Complete Index to Literary Sources in Film. Walter de Gruyter, 1999.
- Rège, Philippe. Encyclopedia of French Film Directors, Volume 1. Scarecrow Press, 2009.
