= London Scrapbook =

1942 British propaganda film by Derrick De Marney, Eugene Cekalski

- Directed by: Derrick De Marney; Eugene Cekalski
- Produced by: Basil Wright
- Starring: Bessie Love; Basil Radford
- Cinematography: A. H. Luff
- Edited by: Ralph Kemplen
- Music by: Douglas Moody
- Production company: Spectator Short Films
- Release date: May 1942
- Running time: 11 minutes
- Country: United Kingdom
- Language: English

London Scrapbook is a 1942 British short propaganda film directed by Derrick De Marney and Eugene Cekalski, and starring Bessie Love, Basil Radford and Leslie Mitchell. It shows the physical devastation that the Blitz caused to London, and humorously communicates the postwar struggles of Londoners to Americans.

The film is preserved at the British Film Institute and was released on the compilation DVD The British Home Front at War: London Can Take It! from the Imperial War Museum.

== Plot ==
American Bessie Love and Englishman Basil Radford try to sell their short film about life in postwar London, specifically highlighting various rationing measures, including petrol, cigarettes, meat, and beer.

== Cast ==
- Bessie Love as herself
- Basil Radford as himself
- Leslie Mitchell as himself
- Patricia Hawks, Love's daughter, as herself (uncredited)
