= In the Wake of a Stranger =

1959 British film by David Eady

- Directed by: David Eady
- Written by: John Tully
- Based on: novel In the Wake of a Stranger by Ian Stuart Black
- Produced by: Jacques de Lane Lea; Jon Penington
- Starring: Tony Wright; Shirley Eaton
- Cinematography: Eric Cross
- Edited by: John Seabourne
- Music by: Edwin Astley
- Production company: Crescent Films
- Distributed by: Butcher's Film Service (UK)
- Release date: June 1959 (UK)
- Running time: 69 minutes
- Country: United Kingdom
- Language: English

In the Wake of a Stranger is a 1959 British second feature ('B') thriller film directed by David Eady and starring Tony Wright, Shirley Eaton and Danny Green. It was written by John Tully based on the 1953 novel of the same name by Ian Stuart Black.

== Plot ==
On a drunken night out, sailor Tom Cassidy finds a dead body. He is subsequently framed by the true murderers, McCabe and Barnes. He sets out to clear his name.

== Cast ==
- Tony Wright as Tom Cassidy
- Shirley Eaton as Joyce Edwards
- Danny Green as Barnes
- Willoughby Goddard as Shafto
- Harry H. Corbett as McCabe
- Tom Bowman as Spike
- Alun Owen as Ferris
- Barbara Archer as barmaid
- Vanda Godsell as Hetty McCabe
- James Ottaway as Johnson
- Peter Sinclair as sea captain
- Peter Carver as lorry driver
- Frank Pemberton as landlord
- Patricia Dean as secretary
- David Hemmings as schoolboy

== Production ==
Filming took place in January 1958.

== Critical reception ==
Variety complained about the film's "unsound, loosely-woven construction that prevails within the yarn... an incredibly puerile tale... at all times, illogical. ... Technically and physically, John Penington's production is sound, lending an authentic backdrop quality that deserves a more respectable yarn up front. David Eady's direction makes the most of all plus values, but manages little headway with the waferweight story."

The Monthly Film Bulletin wrote: "A murky crime thriller, set in Liverpool, slack in tempo and with an over-complicated, unoriginal script. Willoughby Goddard's corpulent Shafto is the best performance of a generally dependable cast."

In The Hollywood Reporter James Powers wrote: "In the Wake of a Stranger is a pretty fair British suspense entry that succeeds when it sticks to its story and tends to falter when it gets away from it. ... As so often in British films, there are several distinctive character actors who give the presentation unusual interest ... A very attractive young actress, Shirley Eaton, supplies the love interest, an interest that is dragged in by the heels and somewhat coyly presented. Miss Eaton, a cool blonde, is far above her material. John Tully's screenplay is all right when it sticks to the point, and David Eady's direction has most effect when it, too, is dealing with the facts of the case and not wandering off with details that seem stuck in because invention has run out."

TV Guide gave the film two out of five stars, writing, "The plot is confusing and often illogical, and the love story only gets in the way of the mystery."

Leonard Maltin gave the film two out of four stars, calling it "just fair."

In British Sound Films: The Studio Years 1928–1959 David Quinlan rated the film as "poor", calling it an "unpersuasive thriller."
