= They Never Say When =

1944 thriller novel by Peter Cheyney

- First edition
- Author: Peter Cheyney
- Language: English
- Series: Slim Callaghan
- Genre: Thriller
- Publisher: William Collins, Sons
- Publication date: 1944
- Publication place: United Kingdom
- Media type: Print
- Preceded by: Sorry You've Been Troubled
- Followed by: Uneasy Terms

They Never Say When is a 1944 thriller novel by the British writer Peter Cheyney. It is the sixth in his series of novels featuring the London private detective Slim Callaghan, a British version of the increasingly popular hardboiled American detectives.

== Synopsis ==
Callaghan is hired by a Mrs Paula Denys who claims that she paid a to steal a priceless coronet from her husband's safe. Now he refuses to hand over the stolen and is instead trying to blackmail her.

== Bibliography ==
- Magill, Frank Northen. Critical Survey of Mystery and Detective Fiction: Authors, Volume 1. Salem Press, 1988.
- Reilly, John M. Twentieth Century Crime & Mystery Writers. Springer, 2015.
- Server, Lee. Encyclopedia of Pulp Fiction Writers. Infobase Publishing, 2014.
