= Dangerous Curves (novel) =

1939 thriller novel by Peter Cheyney

- First edition
- Author: Peter Cheyney
- Language: English
- Series: Slim Callaghan
- Genre: Thriller
- Publisher: William Collins, Sons
- Publication date: 1939
- Publication place: United Kingdom
- Media type: Print
- Pages: 196
- ISBN: 1471901610
- Preceded by: The Urgent Hangman
- Followed by: You Can't Keep the Change

Dangerous Curves is a 1939 thriller novel by the British writer Peter Cheyney. It was the second novel featuring his private detective character Slim Callaghan, following The Urgent Hangman (1938). Callaghan is hired by Mrs. Riverton to find her missing stepson, who she openly admits she despises.

== Stage adaptation ==
In 1953 it was adapted into play of the same title by Gerald Verner. Starring Terence De Marney as Callaghan it ran for 53 performances at the Garrick Theatre in London's West End with a cast that also included Stephen Dartnell, Shaw Taylor and Paul Whitsun-Jones. De Marney had also starred in Meet Mr. Callaghan, a 1952 stage version of The Urgent Hangman.

== Bibliography ==
- Reilly, John M. Twentieth Century Crime & Mystery Writers. Springer, 2015. p. 300. ISBN 0312824181. OL 4437992M.
