= Living It Up (1966 film) =

- Directed by: Pierre Gaspard-Huit
- Written by: Will Berthold; Jean-Loup Dabadie; Pierre Gaspard-Huit
- Starring: Mireille Darc; Jacques Charrier; Daniel Gélin
- Cinematography: Werner M. Lenz
- Edited by: Louisette Hautecoeur
- Music by: Jacques Loussier
- Production companies: Chronos Films; Société Nouvelle de Cinématographie; Teamfilm AS
- Release date: 6 July 1966
- Running time: 105 minutes
- Countries: France; West Germany
- Language: French

Living It Up (French: À belles dents) is a 1966 French-West German drama film directed by Pierre Gaspard-Huit and starring Mireille Darc, Jacques Charrier and Daniel Gélin.

The film's sets were designed by the art director Willy Schatz. It was shot in Eastmancolor.

== Cast ==
- Mireille Darc as Eva Ritter
- Jacques Charrier as Jean-Loup Costa
- Daniel Gélin as Bernard
- Peter van Eyck as Peter von Kessner
- Paul Hubschmid as Francesco Jimenez
- Tilda Thamar as Stella
- Erika Remberg as Marie
- Ilse Steppat as Carol Stevens
- Reinhold Timm as Jaro
- Ingrid Steeger as Girl at fancy dress party
- Maurice Garrel
- Robert Le Béal
- Ellen Bahl
- Helga Lehner
- Henry Djanik
- Christian Lude

== Bibliography ==
- Bock, Hans-Michael & Bergfelder, Tim. The Concise CineGraph. Encyclopedia of German Cinema. Berghahn Books, 2009.
