= Jean Danet =

French actor (1924–2001)

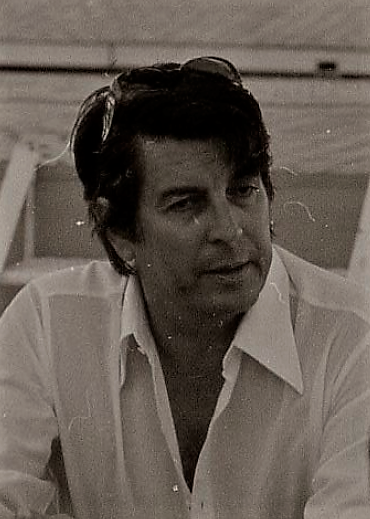
Jean Danet

Jean Danet (14 January 1924 – 16 October 2001) was a French actor. He appeared in 27 films between 1942 and 1983.

Danet was born in Auray, Brittany, France. Following World War II, he began work in films. He founded Tréteaux de France in 1959. Danet died in Paris.

== Filmography ==
- Signé illisible (1942) - Clément
- Journal d'un curé de campagne (1951) - Olivier
- Deburau (1951) - Armand Duval
- Capitaine Ardant (1951) - Idjilla
- The Respectful Prostitute (1952) - Un client du night-club
- My Priest Among the Rich (1952) - Le vicomte Pierre de Sableuse
- Jouons le jeu (1952) - l'acteur (segments 'L'orgueil' and 'La fidélité')
- Deux de l'escadrille (1953)
- La nuit est à nous (1953) - Alain Brécourt
- The Adventurer of Chad (1953) - Alain de Blomette
- Royal Affairs in Versailles (1954) - Boufflers (uncredited)
- Les révoltés de Lomanach (1954) - de Varadec
- Bel Ami (1955) - Georges Duroy dit Bel Ami
- Napoléon (1955) - Le général Gourgaud (uncredited)
- Give 'em Hell (1955) - Diego
- La rue des bouches peintes (1955) - Jack Morgan
- Tides of Passion (1956) - Jean-Pierre
- Pasión en el mar (1956) - Jorge
- Notre-Dame de Paris (1956) - Phoebus de Chateaupers
- The Flapper (1957) - Lucien Vigneret
- Si le roi savait ça (1958) - Marcellin
- Le joueur (1958) - Marquis des Grieux
- Vive Henri IV... vive l'amour! (1961) - Concino Concini
- Dossier 1413 (1962) - Le juge (uncredited)
- Pour Vermeer (1973, TV Movie) - Arsène
- Le double assassinat de la rue Morgue (1973, TV Movie) - Le préfet
- Don Juan (1978, TV Movie) - Dom Luis, le père de Don Juan
- Les trois mousquetaires ou L'escrime ne paie pas (1979, TV Movie) - Richelieu
- Le grand carnaval (1983) - Colonel Raoul de Vigny (final film role)
