= Slim Callaghan Intervenes =

German television series

- Genre: Crime drama
- Based on: Slim Callaghan by Peter Cheyney
- Written by: Edward Maria Solger; Ernest Borneman
- Directed by: Karl Anton
- Starring: Viktor de Kowa; Eva Pflug; Helmuth Rudolph
- Composer: Hermann Thieme
- Country of origin: West Germany
- Original language: German
- No. of series: 1
- No. of episodes: 8

Production
- Producers: Helmut Stoldt; Hans-Jürgen Bobermin
- Cinematography: Paul Grupp
- Editor: Alexandra Anatra
- Running time: 25 minutes

Original release
- Network: ZRD
- Release: 6 July – 7 September 1964

Slim Callaghan Intervenes (German: Slim Callaghan greift ein) is a 1964 West German crime television series broadcast on ZDF in eight episodes. The programme was based on the series of novels by British writer Peter Cheyney featuring the London-based private detective Slim Callaghan. In the television adaptation Callaghan is operating his own agency in Munich. He is played by Viktor de Kowa while Eva Pflug featured as his loyal secretary Steffie.

== Main cast ==
- Viktor de Kowa as Slim Callaghan
- Eva Pflug as Steffie
- Helmuth Rudolph as Inspektor Dallmüller

Other actors who appeared in episodes of the series include Carla Hagen, Grit Boettcher, Hanne Wieder, Ellen Frank, Ursula Herking, Walter Janssen, Karl Schönböck, Jan Hendriks, Ulrich Beiger, Alexander Golling, Dieter Eppler, Hellmut Lange, Lukas Ammann, Rosemarie Fendel, Tatjana Sais, Maria Landrock and Peter Carsten.

== Bibliography ==
- Compart, Martin . Crime TV: Lexikon der Krimi-Serien. Bertz + Fischer, 2000.
- Hruska, Thomas. Der neue Serien Guide: S-Z. Schwarzkopf & Schwarzkopf, 2004
