= Donald Bisset =

English actor (1910–1995)

- Born: Donald Harold Gunn Bisset; 30 August 1910; Brentford, Middlesex, England
- Died: 10 August 1995 (aged 84); London, England
- Occupations: Actor; author

Donald Bisset (30 August 1910 – 10 August 1995), was an English actor.

He trained at the Guildhall School of Music and Drama and made his first London appearance, in A Bride for the Unicorn, at the Westminster Theatre in July 1936.

He also wrote numerous stories for children, which he mostly illustrated himself. They have been translated into 16 languages.

== Selected filmography ==
- Murder in the Cathedral (1951) – First Priest
- Noose for a Lady (1953) – Superintendent Shelford
- The Brain Machine (1955) – Major Gifford, hospital superintendent
- Little Red Monkey (1955) – Editor Harris
- Up the Creek (1958) – Farm Labourer
- Broth of a Boy (1959) – Newcome
- The Headless Ghost (1959) – Guide
- Friends and Neighbours (1959) – Porter
- A Touch of Larceny (1959) – Club Member
- The Battle of the Sexes (1960) – Tobacconist
- Hide and Seek (1964) – Stranger on Platform
- Eye of the Devil (1966) – Rennard
- Jules Verne's Rocket to the Moon (1967) – Flood
- Two a Penny (1967) – Dr Berman
- Carry On Again Doctor (1969) – Patient (uncredited)
- See No Evil (1971) – Doctor
- For the Love of Ada (1972) – Mr Chapman
- Clinic Exclusive (1972) – Chauffeur
- Nearest and Dearest (1972) – Vicar
- The Bawdy Adventures of Tom Jones (1976) – Gentleman of the Hunt (uncredited)
- Escape from the Dark (1976)
- Warlords of Atlantis (1978) – Professor Aitken
- The Thirty Nine Steps (1978) – Renfrew
- Ragtime (1981) – J P Morgan
- Little Dorrit (1987) – Enthusiastic Weighty Gentleman

== Books ==
- Anytime Stories, illus. by the author. London, Faber & Faber, 1954
- Some Time Stories, illus. by the author. London, Methuen & Co., 1957
- Next Time Stories, illus. by the author. London, Methuen & Co., 1959
- This Time Stories, illus. by the author. London, Methuen, 1961
- Another Time Stories, illus. by the author. London, Methuen, 1963
- Little Bear's Pony, illus. Shirley Hughes. London, Benn, 1966
- Hullo Lucy, illus. Gillian Kenny. London, Benn, 1967; as Hello Lucy!, Ernest Benn, 1969
- Talks With a Tiger, illus. by the author. London, Methuen, 1967
- Kangaroo Tennis, illus. B. S. Biro. London, Benn, 1968
- Benjie the Circus Dog, illus. Val Biro. London, Benn, 1969
- Nothing, illus. by the author. London, Benn, 1969
- Upside Down Land. Moscow, Progress Publishers, 1969
- Time and Again Stories (selection of stories from Some Time Stories and This Time Stories), illus. by the author. London, London, Methuen, 1970
- Barcha the Tiger, illus. Derek Collard. London, Benn, 1971
- Tiger Wants More, illus. by the author. London, Methuen, 1971; as Ogg, illus. Amelia Rosato. Oxford University Press, 1987
- Yak and the Painted Cave, illus. Lorraine Calaora. London, Methuen, 1971
- Yak and the Sea Shell, illus. Lorraine Calaora. London, Methuen, 1971
- Yak and the Buried Treasure (from an idea by Susan Rutherford), illus. Lorraine Calaora. London, Methuen, 1972
- Yak and the Ice Cream, illus. Lorraine Calaora. London, Methuen, 1972
- Father Tingtang's Journey, illus. by the author. London, Methuen, 1973
- Jenny Hopalong, illus. Derek Collard. Tonbridge & London, Benn, 1973
- Yak Goes Home, illus. Lorraine Calaora. London, Methuen, 1973
- The Adventures of Mandy Duck, illus. by the author. London, Methuen, 1974
- The Happy Horse, illus. David Sharpe. London, Benn, 1974
- Hazy Mountain, illus. Shirley Hughes. Harmondsworth, Kestrel Books, 1975
- 'Oh Dear', said Tiger, illus. by the author. London, Methuen, 1975
- Paws with Numbers, with Michael Morris, illus. Tony Hutchings. Maidenhead, Berks., Intercontinental Books, 1976
- Paws with Shapes, illus. Tony Hutchings. Maidenhead, Berks., Intercontinental Books, 1976
- The Lost Birthday, illus. by the author. Moscow, Progress Publishers, 1976
- Journey to the Jungle, illus. by the author. London, Beaver Books, 1977
- The Story of Smokey Horse, illus. by the author. London, Methuen, 1977
- This is Ridiculous, illus. by the author. London, Beaver Books, 1977
- The Adventures of Yak, illus. by the author. London, Methuen, 1978
- What Time Is It, When it Isn't?, illus. by the author. London, Methuen, 1980
- Johnny Here and There, illus. by the author. London, Methuen Children's Books, 1981
- The Hedgehog Who Rolled Uphill, illus. by the author. London, Methuen Children's Books, 1982
- The Joyous Adventures of Snakey Boo, illus. by the author. London, Methuen Children's Books, 1982
- Sleep Tight, Snakey Boo, illus. by the author. London, Methuen Children's Books, 1985
- Upside Down Stories, with Alison Claire Darke. London, Puffin, 1987
- Just a Moment!, illus. by the author. London, Methuen Children's Books, 1988
- Please Yourself. London, Methuen Children's Books, 1991
