= Przesieczany =

- Village
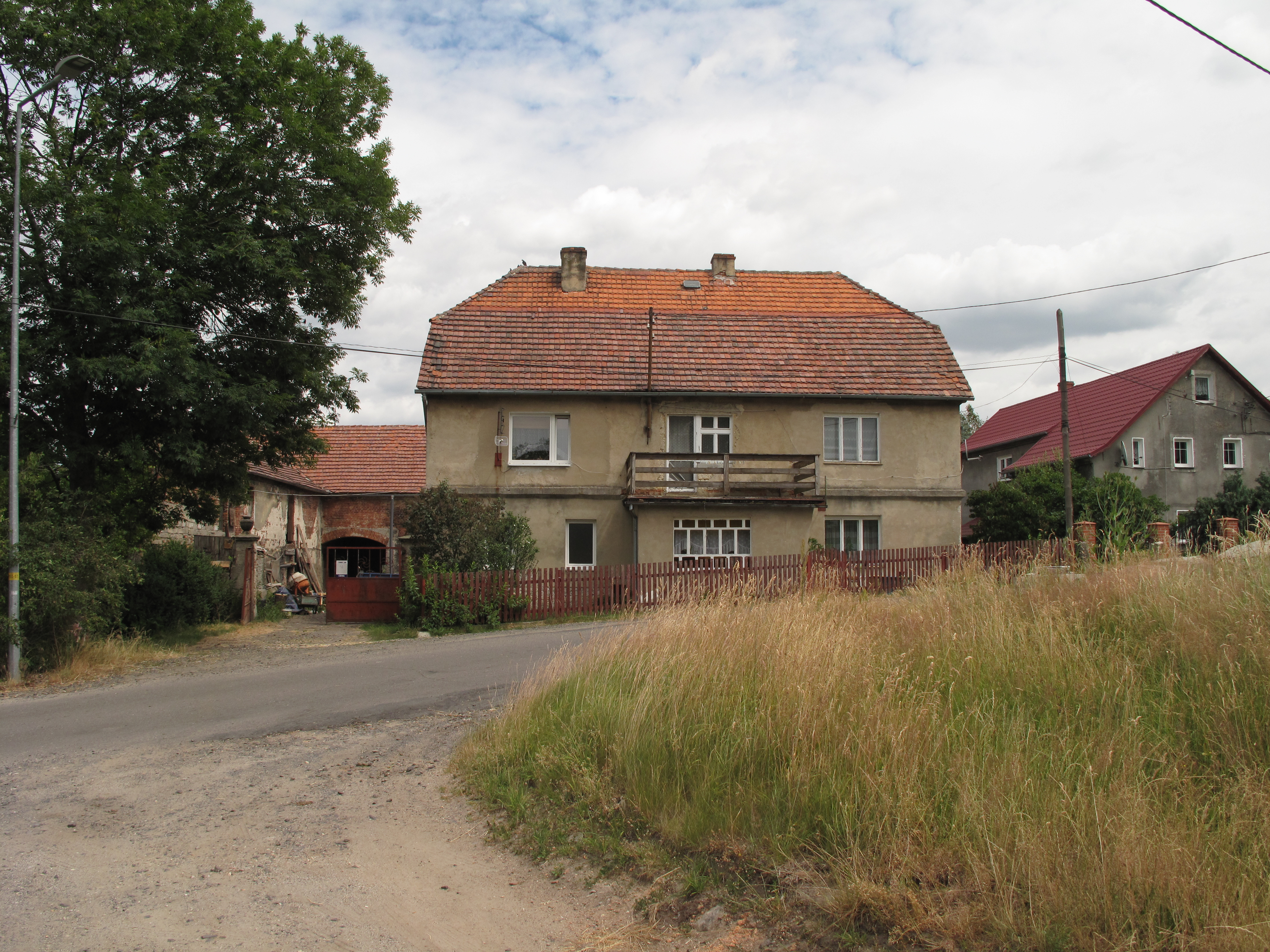
- A house

- Location within Poland
- Coordinates: 51°12′N 15°5′E
- Country: Poland
- Voivodeship: Lower Silesian
- County: Zgorzelec
- Gmina: Zgorzelec
- Population: 108

Przesieczany [pʂɛɕɛˈt͡ʂanɨ] (Upper Sorbian: Sedme) is a village in the administrative district of Gmina Zgorzelec, within Zgorzelec County, Lower Silesian Voivodeship, in south-western Poland, close to the German border.

== Gallery ==
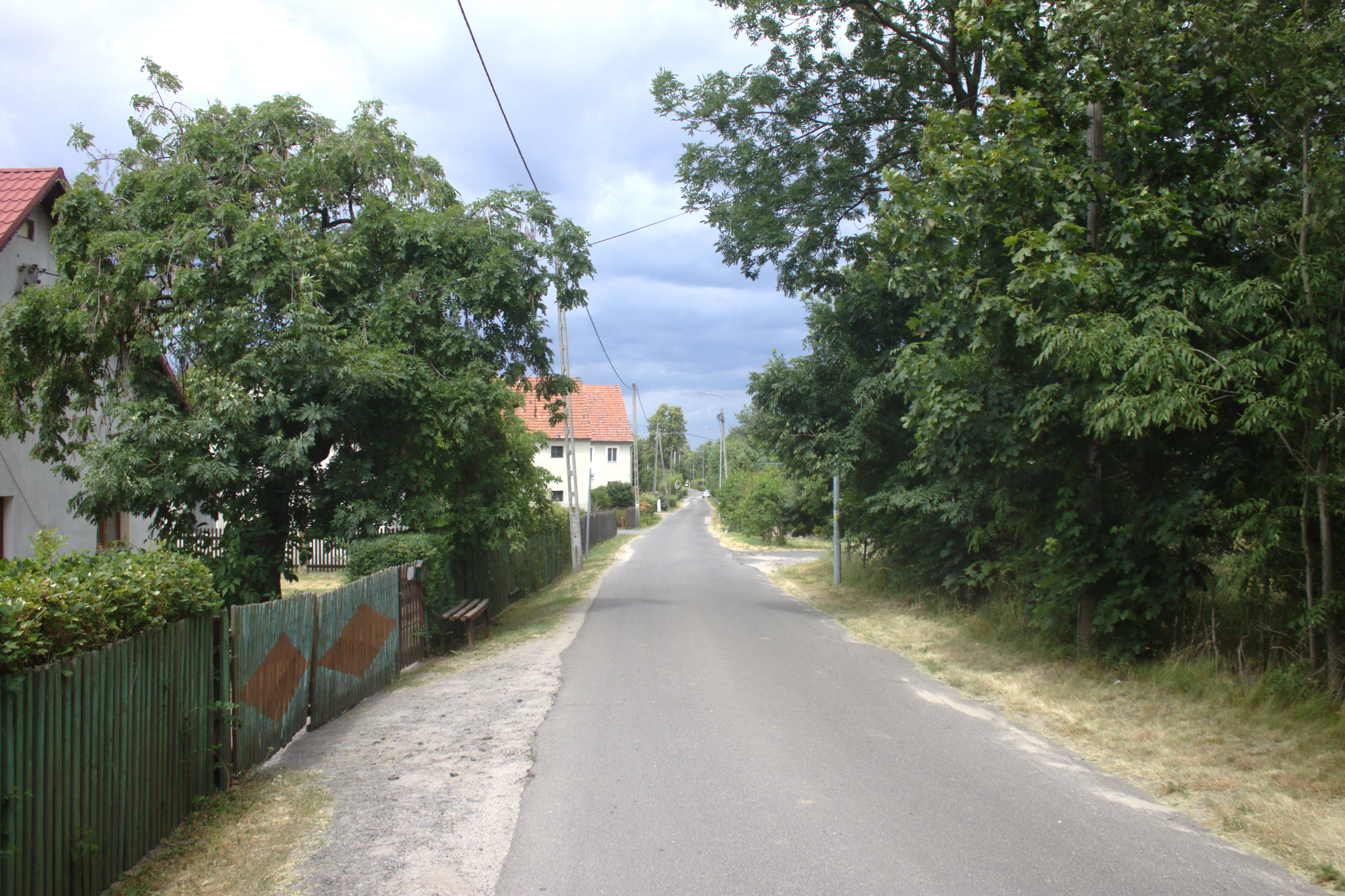
A street

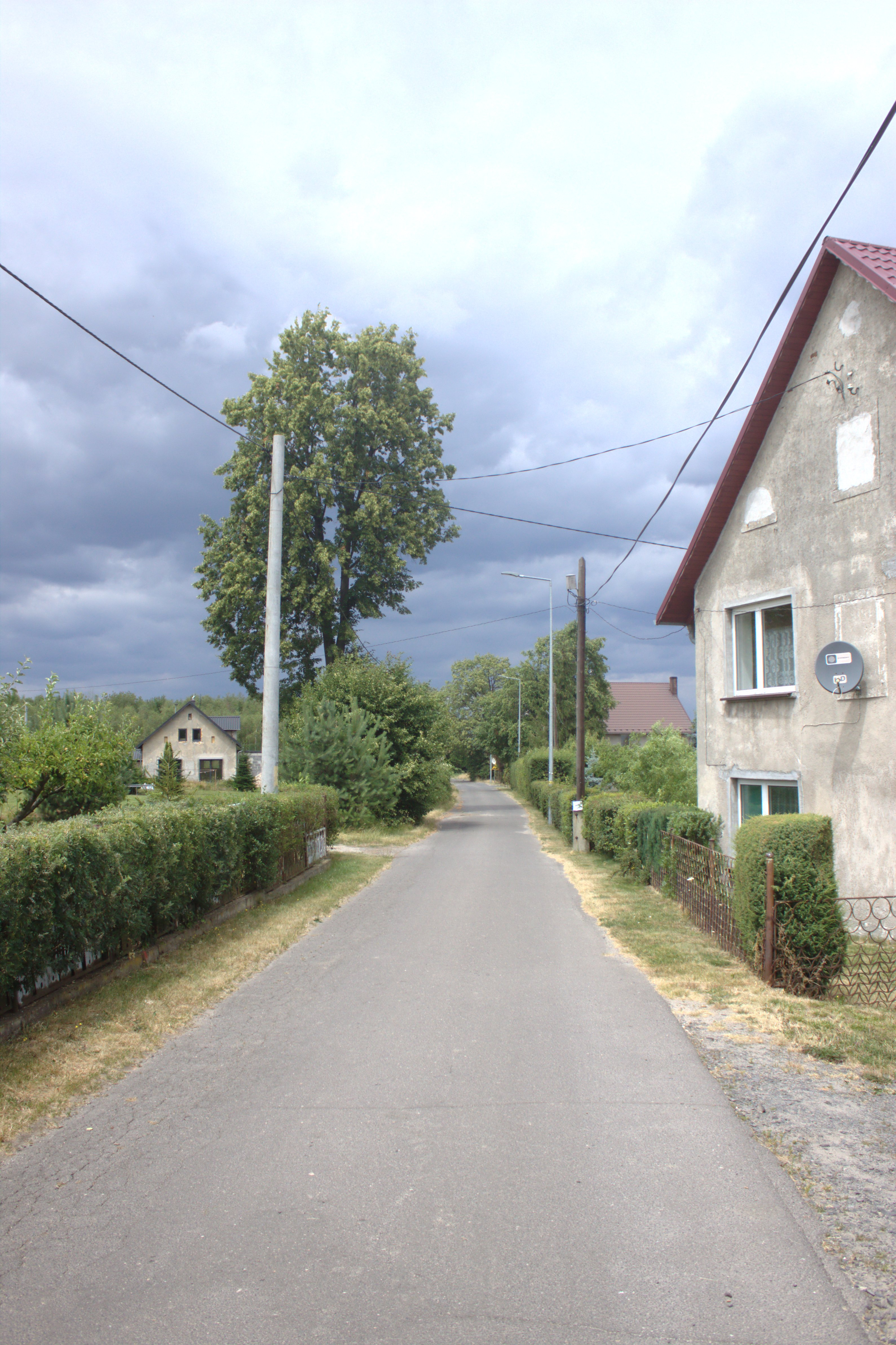
Street

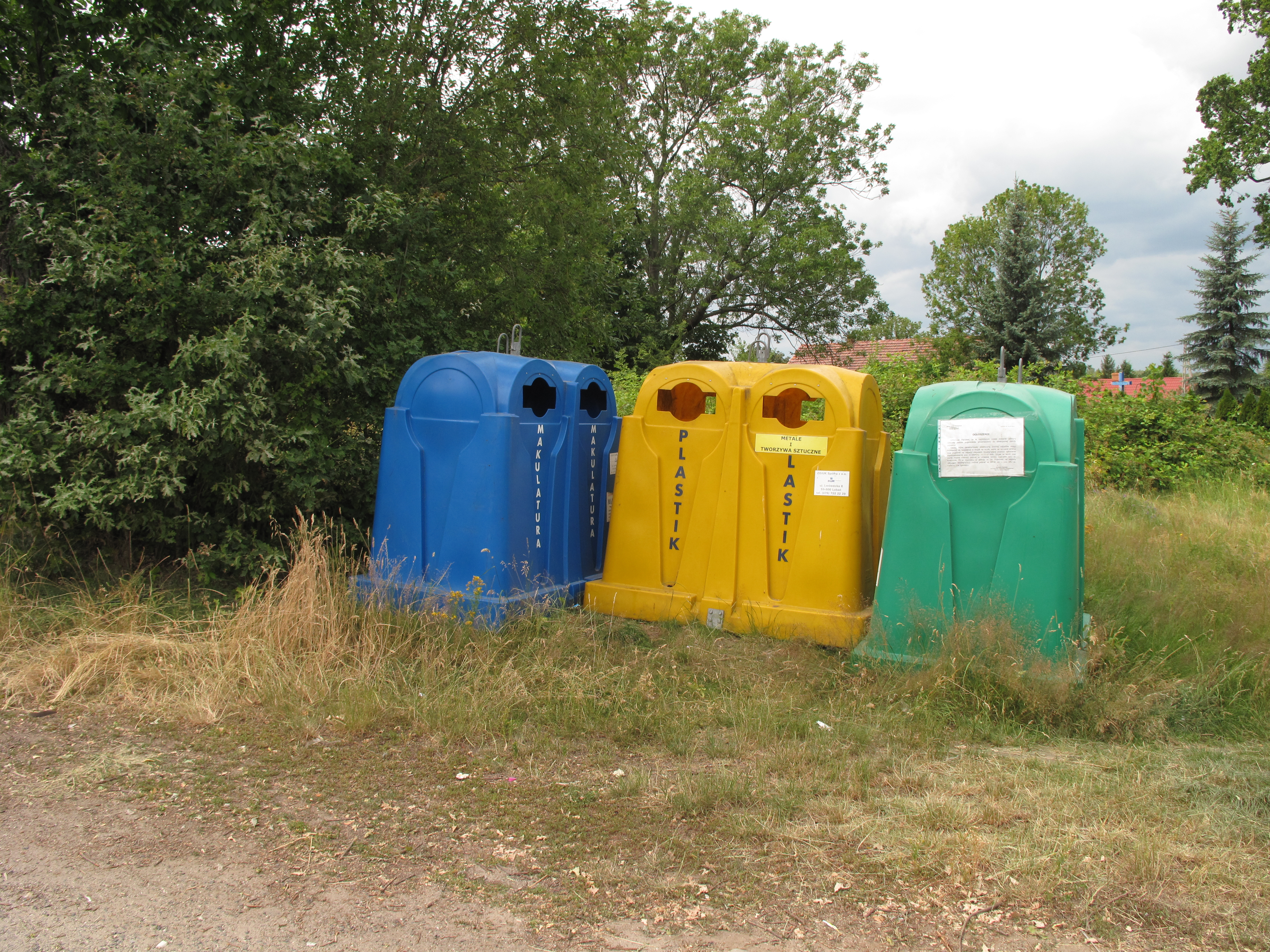
Sorted waste management conteiners

== Notable residents ==
- Viktor de Kowa (1904 - 1973), actor
