= Barbara Archer =

British actress (born 1934)

- Born: Barbara Janet Archer; 1934; East Ham, Essex, England
- Occupation: Actress
- Spouse: Clive L. Taylor (m. 1955)

Barbara Janet Archer (born 1934) is a British actress.

== Life and career ==
Barbara Janet Archer was born in East Ham, Essex in 1934. She graduated from the Royal Academy of Dramatic Art in 1953 and subsequently played the staff matron in the early BBC sitcom Whack-O!.

She remains probably best known, however, for her appearance in the 1958 film Dracula, starring Peter Cushing and Christopher Lee.

Archer married Clive L. Taylor, a meat porter at Smithfield Market, in East Ham in October 1955, having turned 21 shortly prior.

== Selected filmography ==
- A Kid for Two Farthings (1955) - Madam Rita's Workroom Girl (uncredited)
- Oh... Rosalinda!! (1955) - Lady
- Lost (1956) - bit role (uncredited)
- Jumping for Joy (1956) - Marlene
- The Feminine Touch (1956) - Liz Jenkins
- Eyewitness (1956) - bit role (uncredited)
- Three Men in a Boat (1956) - Pretty Girl (uncredited)
- The Passionate Stranger (1957) - Doris the barmaid
- The Good Companions (1957) - Barmaid
- Miracle in Soho (1957) - Gwladys
- The Shiralee (1957) - Shopgirl
- Strangers' Meeting (1957) - Rosie Foster
- Dracula (1958) - Inga
- Model for Murder (1959) - Betty Costard
- In the Wake of a Stranger (1959) - Barmaid
- Libel (1959) - Barmaid
- Devil's Bait (1959) - Switchboard Operator (uncredited)
- 633 Squadron (1964) - Rosie the barmaid at the Black Swan Inn
- Rattle of a Simple Man (1964) - Iris
- Up the Junction (1968) - May (final film role)

== Selected television ==
- The Adventures of Robin Hood (1957)
