= Manina, the Girl in the Bikini =

1952 French film by Willy Rozier

Manina, la fille sans voiles
- Original French-language poster
- Directed by: Willy Rozier
- Written by: Willy Rozier; Xavier Vallier
- Produced by: Wily Rozier
- Starring: Brigitte Bardot; Jean-François Calvé; Howard Vernon
- Cinematography: Michel Rocca
- Edited by: Suzanne Baron
- Music by: Marcel Bianchi; Jean Yatove
- Distributed by: Atlantis Films (US)
- Release dates: 1952 (France); 24 October 1958 (U.S.)
- Running time: 86 minutes
- Country: France
- Language: French
- Box office: 1,115,424 admissions (France)

Manina, the Girl in the Bikini (French: Manina, la fille sans voiles [Manina, the girl without veils]) released in the UK as Manina, the Lighthouse Keeper's Daughter), is a 1952 French film directed by Willy Rozier and starring Brigitte Bardot, Jean-François Calvé and Howard Vernon. The film is one of Bardot's first film roles, at the age of 17 and was controversial for the scanty bandeau-top bikinis worn by the young Bardot in the film, one of the first occasions when a bikini had appeared in film and when the bikini was still widely considered immodest.

Though released in France in 1952 as Manina, la fille sans voiles, the film was not released in the United States until 1958 as Manina, the Girl in the Bikini and in the United Kingdom until 1959 as The Lighthouse-Keeper's Daughter. In other countries it was released under other names. The film was able to be screened in the United States notwithstanding the Hays Code prohibition of exposure of the navel, as a foreign film.

The film was shot in Cannes, Nice and Paris in the summer of 1952. Brigitte Bardot's father had signed a contract, on behalf of his minor daughter, specifying that the film was not to show indecent images. When in the course of filming, a series of "highly suggestive" photographs of his daughter was released, he accused the producing company of not respecting the contract and demanded that the film not be projected without the permission of a court. He lost the suit.

== Plot ==
A 25-year-old Parisian student, Gérard Morere (Calvé), hears a lecture about a treasure Troilus lost at sea after the Peloponnesian War. Gérard thinks he knows where it is, thanks to a discovery he made five years earlier when diving near the island of Levezzi, in Corsica. He gets friends and an innkeeper to invest in his dream, enough to get him to Tangiers where he convinces a cigarette smuggler, Eric (Vernon), to take him to the island on Eric's boat.

There they find 18-year-old Manina (Bardot), the light-keeper's daughter, who is beautiful and pure. Manina and Gérard fall in love. Eric thinks Gérard may have conned him, but Gérard's belief in the treasure compels patience. Gérard dives by day and romances Manina at night. Gérard finds the treasure, though Eric betrays him and absconds with it. However, Eric's boat is shipwrecked in a storm and sinks. The film ends with Manina and Gérard embracing.

== Cast ==
- Jean-François Calvé as Gérard Morère
- Brigitte Bardot as Manina
- Howard Vernon as Éric
- Henry Djanik as Marcel (credited as H. Djanik)
- Espanita Cortez as La Franchucha
- Raymond Cordy as Francis, the bartender
- Paulette Andrieux (credited as Paulette Andrieu)
- Jean Droze as Buddy of Gérard (credited as Droze)
- Nadine Tallier as Mathilda (credited as N. Tallier)
- Maurice Bénard (credited as Bénard)

== Reception ==
"If nothing else, it will inform you of a fetching whimsical innocence that Mlle. Bardot possessed in those days. But aside from this refreshing picture of B. B. before she became a self-conscious and teasing stereotype, The Girl in the Bikini, which was called "Manina, la Fille Sans Voile" in France, has little to set it apart." - Richard W. Nason, The New York Times, 25 October 1958

Filmink argued Bardot "doesn’t appear until the movie is almost half over, but once she does, you can’t take your eyes off her. It’s clear that from the beginning, Brigitte Bardot simply had It – charisma, presence, incredible sex appeal."
