= Ralph Kemplen =

British film editor (1912–2004)

- Born: 8 October 1912; London, England
- Died: 4 April 2004 (aged 91); London, England
- Occupation: film editor
- Children: Willy Kemplen

Ralph Kemplen (8 October 1912 – 4 April 2004) was a British film editor with more than fifty film credits between 1933 and 1982. He had a long collaboration with director John Huston on six films between 1951 and 1966. He also directed one feature film, The Spaniard's Curse (1958).

Kemplen won the BAFTA Award for Best Editing for The Day of the Jackal (1973) and was nominated three times for the Academy Award for Best Film Editing (for Moulin Rouge (1952), Oliver! (1968), and Day of the Jackal).

== Selected filmography ==
The director of each film is indicated in parentheses.

- My Heart Is Calling (1935)
- She Shall Have Music (1935)
- Death on the Set (Hiscott, 1935)
- The Man in the Mirror (Elvey, 1936)
- Dusty Ermine (Vorhaus, 1936)
- Young Man's Fancy (Stevenson, 1939)
- London Scrapbook (De Marney & Cekalski, 1942)
- The Saint Meets the Tiger (Stein, 1943)
- Carnival (Haynes, 1946)
- Mr. Perrin and Mr. Traill (Huntington, 1948)
- The African Queen (Huston, 1951)
- Moulin Rouge (Huston, 1952)
- Beat the Devil (Huston, 1953)
- Room at the Top (Clayton, 1959)
- The Savage Innocents (Ray, 1960)
- Freud (Huston, 1962)
- The Night of the Iguana (Huston, 1964)
- A Man for All Seasons (Zinnemann, 1966)
- The Bible: In the Beginning... (Huston, 1966)
- Oliver! (Reed, 1968)
- The Day of the Jackal (Zinnemann, 1973) (for which he won the 1974 BAFTA Award).
- The Odessa File (Neame, 1974)
- Golden Rendezvous (1977)
- Escape to Athena (Cosmatos, 1979)
- The Great Muppet Caper (Henson, 1981)
- The Dark Crystal (Henson & Oz, 1982)

== See also ==
- List of film director and editor collaborations
