= Terence De Marney =

British actor (1908–1971)

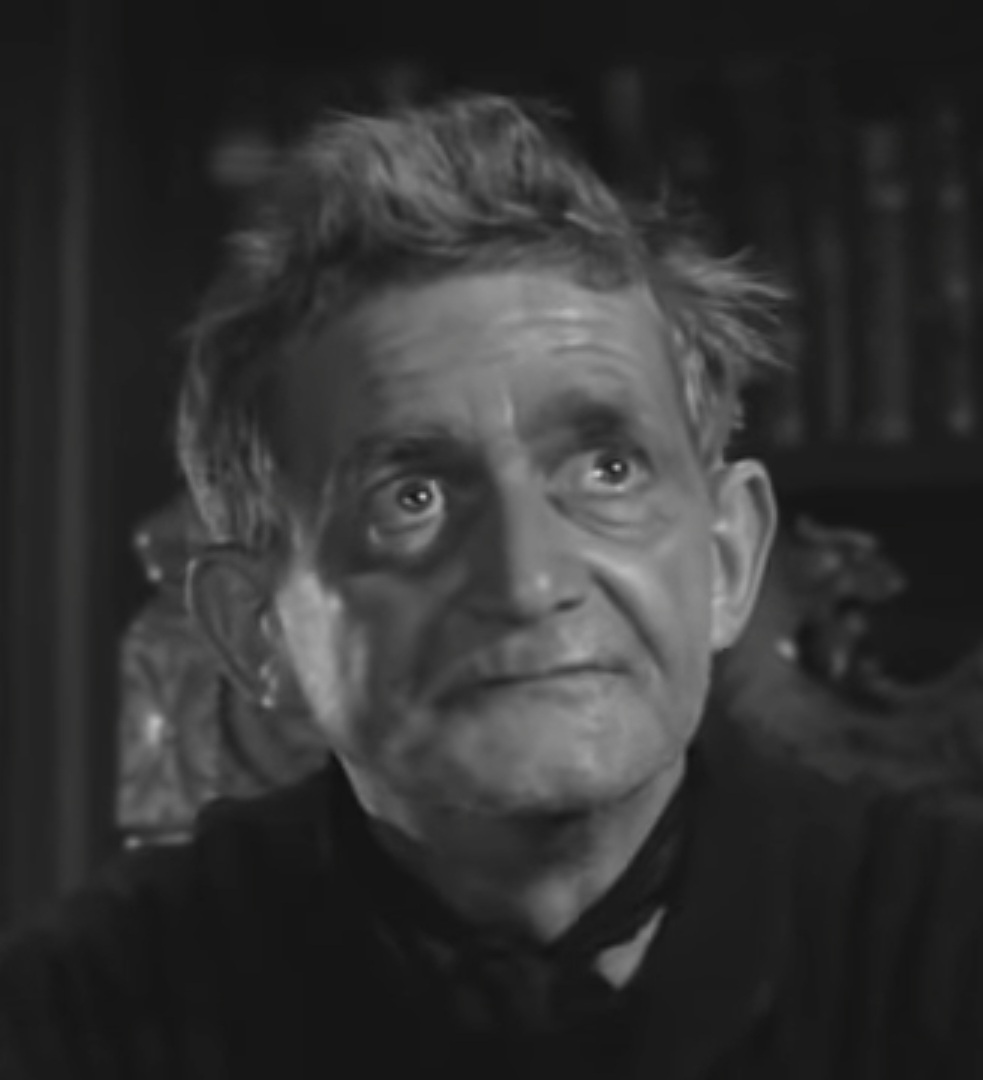
- De Marney on the television series Thriller in "The Return of Andrew Bentley", 1961
- Born: Terence Arthur De Marney; 1 March 1908; London, England
- Died: 25 May 1971 (aged 63); London, England
- Resting place: West Norwood Cemetery, south London
- Occupations: Actor; writer
- Years active: 1931–1971
- Spouses: Diana Hope-Dunbar (m. 1937, divorced) Beryl Measor (m. 1945; died 1965)
- Relatives: Derrick De Marney (brother)

Terence Arthur De Marney (1 March 1908 – 25 May 1971) was a British film, stage, radio and television actor, as well as theatre director and writer.

== Career ==
=== Actor ===
The son of Violet Eileen Concanen and Arthur De Marney, and the grandson of noted Victorian lithographer Alfred Concanen, his career in the theatre began in 1923 and continued almost without interruption, taking in film, radio and television parts. He toured with Mrs Patrick Campbell in The Last of Mrs. Cheyney. In 1930 he played Gustave in The Lady of the Camellias, and toured South Africa as Raleigh in Journey's End. In 1934 he played Tybalt in Romeo and Juliet at the Open Air Theatre, and Giovanni in 'Tis Pity She's a Whore at the Arts. Thrillers tended to be his stock in trade, appearing in a revival of Sutton Vane's Outward Bound during the 1930s, as well as Agatha Christie's Ten Little Indians and Dear Murderer. In later years he appeared in a revival of Gerald Du Maurier's Trilby.

He also appeared on radio as the Count of Monte Cristo, and was the first actor to portray Leslie Charteris' Simon Templar on radio, when The Saint debuted on Radio Athlone in 1940 for six episodes.

He made his film debut in 1931, and went on to appear in a number of quota quickies of the period, including mystery horror films The Unholy Quest (1934) and The Mystery of the Mary Celeste (1935), the latter opposite Bela Lugosi. His distinctive looks seemed to fit the macabre and he would continue to appear in horror films throughout his career including Pharaoh's Curse (1957), the Boris Karloff vehicle Die, Monster, Die! (1965) and The Hand of Night (1968).

After starring in 'B' films Dual Alibi (1948), and No Way Back (1949), he uprooted to Hollywood, where he appeared in a number of famous television series such as Bonanza, Wagon Train, Maverick, Thriller, and The Twilight Zone. He was a series regular in the role of Case Thomas on CBS's Johnny Ringo, with Don Durant, Mark Goddard, and Karen Sharpe. He also played small roles in such Hollywood films as The Silver Chalice (1954), The Virgin Queen (1955), The Ten Commandments (1956), Spartacus and Midnight Lace (both 1960).

He returned to Britain in the 1960s and continued to appear in television series such as Maigret, Dr. Finlay's Casebook, Doctor Who and Z-Cars. His later film appearances were Separation, The Strange Affair and All Neat in Black Stockings (all 1968).

=== Director ===
In 1931, he became director of the Connaught Theatre, Worthing, and in 1932, with his brother, the actor Derrick De Marney, he founded the Independent Theatre Club at the Kingsway Theatre, where he directed Emil Ludwig's Versailles and an adaptation of Schnitzler's novel Fraulein Else. He also directed Louis Golding's Magnolia Street Story and Master Crook, originally called Cosh Boy. With his brother he alternated as Slim Callaghan in Meet Mr. Callaghan at the Garrick Theatre and carried on the same role in the play's sequel Dangerous Curves, which he produced and directed.

=== Writer ===
De Marney wrote the play Wanted for Murder in 1946, which was made into a film, and was also known as A Voice in the Night. With Percy Robinson he wrote the stage thrillers The Whispering Gallery, Wanted for Murder and The Crime of Margaret Foley; he collaborated with Ralph Stock to write Search. He co-wrote the screenplay for No Way Back (1949), in which he starred, with the director Stefan Osiecki.

== Death ==
De Marney died in 1971, aged 63, after what was initially reported as an accidental fall in front of a train in the London Underground. He was buried in the family plot at West Norwood Cemetery in south London. An inquest later recorded a verdict of suicide.

== Spouses ==
His first wife was Diana Hope-Dunbar née Fraser, whom he married in 1937. He married his second wife, actress Beryl Measor, in 1945, and they remained married until her death in 1965.

== Filmography ==
Year	Title	Role	Notes
1931	The Eternal Feminine	Michael Winthrop	
1932	Heroes of the Mine	Youngster	
1933	Eyes of Fate	Edgar	
1934	The Unholy Quest	Frank Davis	
1935	The Immortal Gentleman	Harry Morton / Hamlet / Romeo	
1935	The Mystery of the Mary Celeste	Charlie Kaye	
1936	Born That Way	Richard Gearing	
1937	Thunder in the City	Reporter	Uncredited
1939	I Killed the Count	Det. Sgt. Raines	
1943	They Met in the Dark	Code Expert	
1947	Dual Alibi	Mike Bergen	
1948	Uneasy Terms		
1949	No Way Back	Croucher	
1954	The Silver Chalice	Sosthene	
1955	Mad at the World	Pop	
1955	The Virgin Queen	Archbishop	Uncredited
1955	Target Zero	Pvt. Harry Fontenoy	
1955	Desert Sands	Kramer	Uncredited
1956	23 Paces to Baker Street	Det. Sgt. Luce	
1956	The Ten Commandments	Hebrew at Rameses' Gate	Uncredited
1957	Pharaoh's Curse	Sgt. Smolett	
1957	My Gun Is Quick	Jean, the French Janitor	
1959	The Wreck of the Mary Deare	Frank	
1960	Spartacus	Majordomo	Uncredited
1960	Midnight Lace	Tim	Uncredited
1960	The Secret of the Purple Reef	Ashby	
1961	On the Double	Sergeant Colin Twickenham	
1962	Confessions of an Opium Eater	Scrawny Man	
1965	Die, Monster, Die!	Merwyn	
1966	Death Is a Woman	Jacomini	
1968	Separation	Old man	
1968	The Strange Affair	Mahon	
1968	The Hand of Night	Omar	
1969	All Neat in Black Stockings	Gunge	

== Selected television ==
Year	Title	Role	N1 otes
1959	Have Gun - Will Travel	Fitzgerald	Season 3, Episode 9 "The Black Handkerchief"
1964	The Third Man	Camillo	Season 3, Episode 7 "Mars in Conjunction"
1966	Doctor Who	Joseph Longfoot	1 episode; serial: The Smugglers
