= Noose for a Lady =

1953 film by Wolf Rilla

- Opening title
- Directed by: Wolf Rilla
- Screenplay by: Rex Rienits
- Based on: The Whispering Woman by Gerald Verner
- Produced by: Victor Hanbury
- Starring: Dennis Price; Rona Anderson; Ronald Howard
- Cinematography: Walter Harvey
- Edited by: Geoffrey Muller
- Music by: De Wolfe
- Production company: Insignia Films
- Distributed by: Anglo-Amalgamated Film Distributors (UK)
- Release dates: 8 April 1953 (London); 20 July 1953 (UK)
- Running time: 76 minutes
- Country: United Kingdom
- Language: English

Noose for a Lady is a 1953 British crime film directed by Wolf Rilla and starring Dennis Price, Rona Anderson and Ronald Howard. It was written by Rex Reinits based on the 1949 novel The Whispering Woman by Gerald Verner and was one of several films Rienits wrote for Anglo Amalgamated.

== Plot ==
The plot concerns an amateur detective Simon Gale who races against time to clear the name of his cousin, who is accused of murdering her husband.

Simon meets the murdered man's daughter, Jill, who had earlier promised her stepmother that she would continue to try to prove her innocence, and Simon offers to help. He begins questioning local people, and learns that the husband was a thoroughly unpleasant man who enjoyed holding people's secrets over their heads, not for monetary gain, but for the pleasure of seeing them squirm – and several local people had secrets. More deaths occur before Gale discovers the truth. He assembles all the suspects in a single room in a large house and announces that one of them is a murderer. He manoeuvres the real killer into making a mistake, then explains who the murderer is and how he reached that conclusion.

== Cast ==
- Dennis Price as Simon Gale
- Rona Anderson as Jill Hallam
- Ronald Howard as Dr. Evershed
- Pamela Alan as Margaret Hallam
- Melissa Stribling as Vanessa Lane
- Alison Leggatt as Mrs. Langdon-Humphries
- Esma Cannon as Miss Ginch
- Charles Lloyd-Pack as Robert Upcott
- Colin Tapley as Major Fergusson
- Robert Brown as Jonas Rigg
- George Merritt as Sergeant Frost
- Doris Yorke as Mrs. Barratt
- Gabrielle Blunt as Agnes Potter
- Joe Linnane as prison chaplain
- Eric Messiter as judge
- Michael Nightingale as the barrister
- Ian Wallace as the landlord
- Donald Bisset as Superintendent Shelford

== Critical reception ==
The Monthly Film Bulletin wrote: "A well-produced murder mystery with competent performances from the whole cast."

Kine Weekly wrote: "The types, portrayed by a particularly well-chosen cast, are life-like, while suspense, the essence of all crime confracts, is skilfully worked into the "in the nick of time" climax. ... Dennis Price acts smoothly as Simon, Rona Anderson is completely disarming as Jill, and Ronald Howard, Charles Lloyd Pack, Robert Brown, Esme Cannon and a host of other well-known players make intriguing red herrings. Dialogue fluent and detail adequate, Theatrically effective, yet by no means lacking in action, it'll keep the majority guessing and on their toes."

TV Guide called the film "Overly chatty."

Cinema Retro found it "A quaint, cliché ridden drama," concluding more positively, "yes, of course it creaks a little, but if nothing else it’s guaranteed to hold your attention for its succinct 70-minute runtime."

DVD Beaver saluted "A taut, complex whodunit with a brilliantly nerve-racking climax."
