= Strangers' Meeting =

1957 British film by Robert Day

- Original British quad poster
- Directed by: Robert Day
- Written by: David Gordon
- Based on: novel by Richard Savage
- Starring: Peter Arne; Delphi Lawrence; Conrad Phillips
- Cinematography: Arthur Grant
- Edited by: Peter Mayhew
- Music by: Albert Elms
- Production company: Jack Parsons Productions (as Parroch)
- Distributed by: J. Arthur Rank Film Distributors (UK)
- Release date: October 1957
- Running time: 64 min.
- Country: United Kingdom
- Language: English

Strangers' Meeting is a 1957 British second feature ('B') crime drama film directed by Robert Day and starring Peter Arne and Delphi Lawrence. It was written by David Gordon.

== Plot ==
Trapeze artist Harry is wrongly convicted of murder after his partner falls to her death. He escapes from jail and hides out in a country pub, on a mission to uncover the identity of the real killer.

== Cast ==
- Peter Arne as Harry Belair
- Delphi Lawrence as Margot Sanders
- Conrad Phillips as David Sanders
- Barbara Archer as Rosie Foster
- Victor Maddern as Willie Fisher
- David Ritch as Giovanni
- Doris Hare as Nellie
- John Kelly as Michael OHara
- David Lodge as Fred
- Norman Rossington as barrow boy

== Critical reception ==
The Monthly Film Bulletin wrote: "It is sad to find this muddled melodrama of no real interest or merit, attributed to Robert Day, whose first film The Green Man promised such a lively future."

Kine Weekly wrote: " There are many facets to its plot, but neither he players nor the director succeed in patternng them into a plausible or particularly exciting mosaic. Brevity is almost its sole virtue. ... The picture is presented against a London low-life backdrop, but its settings are no more convincing than its plot and characters. Conrad Phillips has an easy manner as David, but Peter Arne, Delphi Lawrence and the rest of the players are unimpressive. The direction, too, lacks finesse and imagination. Far too much is attempted on a shoestring."

Picturegoer wrote: " Conrad Phillips is a credit to the National Health Service as the doctor, but fails to achieve the impossible and bring conviction, let alone thrills, to what is really a lopsided panel game."

In British Sound Films: The Studio Years 1928–1959 David Quinlan rated the film as "poor", writing: "Totally unconvincing; quite a hiccup in thecareers of all concerned."
