= Uneasy Terms (novel) =

1946 novel

- First edition
- Author: Peter Cheyney
- Language: English
- Series: Slim Callaghan
- Genre: Thriller
- Publisher: William Collins, Sons
- Publication date: 1946
- Publication place: United Kingdom
- Media type: Print
- Preceded by: They Never Say When

Uneasy Terms is a 1946 crime thriller novel by the British writer Peter Cheyney. It was the seventh and last in his series featuring the London-based private detective Slim Callaghan, a British version of the hardboiled heroes of American writing.

== Synopsis ==
Callaghan encounter a case in a small country village near Alfriston where a wealthy woman may have been killed by any one of her three attractive daughters, furious about the terms of the new will she was drafting.

== Film adaptation ==
In 1948 it was made into a British film of the same title directed by Vernon Sewell and starring Michael Rennie, Moira Lister and Joy Shelton.

== Bibliography ==
- Goble, Alan. The Complete Index to Literary Sources in Film. Walter de Gruyter, 1999.
- Magill, Frank Northen. Critical Survey of Mystery and Detective Fiction: Authors, Volume 1. Salem Press, 1988.
- Reilly, John M. Twentieth Century Crime & Mystery Writers. Springer, 2015.
- Server, Lee. Encyclopedia of Pulp Fiction Writers. Infobase Publishing, 2014.
