= Meet Mr. Callaghan =

1954 British film by Charles Saunders

- British quad poster
- Directed by: Charles Saunders
- Screenplay by: Brock Williams
- Based on: The Urgent Hangman by Peter Cheyney; Meet Mr. Callaghan by Gerald Verner
- Produced by: Guido Coen; Derrick De Marney; W.A. Smith
- Starring: Derrick De Marney; Adrienne Corri; Delphi Lawrence; Belinda Lee
- Cinematography: Harry Waxman
- Edited by: Jack Slade
- Music by: Eric Spear
- Production company: Pinnacle Productions
- Distributed by: Eros Films
- Release date: June 1954 (UK)
- Running time: 88 minutes
- Country: United Kingdom
- Language: English

Meet Mr. Callaghan is a 1954 British crime drama film directed by Charles Saunders and starring Derrick De Marney and Adrienne Corri. The screenplay was by Brock Williams, based on the 1952 play of the same name, adapted for the stage by Gerald Verner from Peter Cheyney's 1938 novel The Urgent Hangman.

Co-producer and star De Marney had directed the stage version at the Garrick Theatre in 1952, which starred his brother Terence as private eye Slim Callaghan. Derrick played this role in the film.

== Plot ==
Down at heel private detective Slim Callaghan is hired by young socialite Cynthis Meraulton to investigate other family members after her rich stepfather changes his will in her favour. She suspects he will be killed and the new will destroyed. When her stepfather is subsequently murdered, suspicion falls on Cynthis.

== Cast ==
- Derrick De Marney as Slim Callaghan
- Harriette Johns as Cynthis Meraulton
- Adrienne Corri as Mayola
- Delphi Lawrence as Effie
- Trevor Reid as Inspector Gringall
- Belinda Lee as Jenny Appleby
- Larry Burns as Darky
- Peter Neil as William Meraulton
- John Longden as Jeremy Meraulton
- Roger Williams as Bellamy Meraulton
- Frank Henderson as Paul Meraulton
- Frank Sieman as Sergeant Fields
- Michael Partridge as Jengel
- Howard Douglas as Tweest
- John Ainsworth as P.C. Masters
- Michael Balfour as coffee stallkeeper
- Robert Adair as August Meraulton

== Production ==
Filming took place at Nettleford Studios in September 1953.

It was the second film from Belinda Lee.

== Critical reception ==
The Monthly Film Bulletin said the "transference" from stage to screen "has been made without much imagination. The involved plot is helped along by a few barbed lines but Derrick de Marney fails to make a sympathetic hero out of a private detective who stoops to robbery, blackmail and bribery in his investigations."

In British Sound Films: The Studio Years 1928–1959 David Quinlan rated the film as "average", writing: "Sort of street-level Thin Man is effective thick ear, short on charm."

TV Guide wrote, "Mystery programmer has a couple of good moments, but little else."
