= Tiger in the Smoke =

1956 British film by Roy Ward Baker

- Directed by: Roy Ward Baker
- Written by: Margery Allingham; Anthony Pelissier
- Produced by: Leslie Parkyn
- Starring: Donald Sinden; Muriel Pavlow; Tony Wright; Bernard Miles; Christopher Rhodes
- Cinematography: Geoffrey Unsworth
- Edited by: John D. Guthridge
- Music by: Malcolm Arnold
- Production company: Rank Organisation
- Distributed by: Rank Organisation
- Release date: 27 November 1956
- Running time: 94 minutes (United Kingdom)
- Country: United Kingdom
- Language: English

Tiger in the Smoke is a 1956 British crime film directed by Roy Ward Baker (billed as Roy Baker) and starring Donald Sinden, Muriel Pavlow, Tony Wright, Bernard Miles and Christopher Rhodes. It is based on the 1952 novel The Tiger in the Smoke by Margery Allingham. The film is set in a noirish smog-shrouded London and briefly in Brittany, France, and combines the genres of mystery, thriller, crime and drama. The cinematography was by Geoffrey Unsworth.

Except for the omission of the principal character of Albert Campion, the film follows the plot of the book very closely.

== Plot ==
Having been sent a picture of her husband, a war hero reported missing in action in France, Meg Elgin, now engaged to Geoffrey Leavitt, is led to believe he is still alive and arranges a meeting at a London railway station. When she arrives there with the police accompanying her, she catches sight of a man in the distance wearing an old coat of her husband's. When he is pursued and captured, he turns out to be Duds Morrison, a former soldier and out-of-work actor recently let out of prison. He refuses to tell them anything, and having nothing to charge him with, the police release him.

His interest aroused by the pictures sent to Meg, Leavitt follows Morrison and tries to question him about his sudden appearance masquerading as Meg's dead husband. Morrison again refuses to talk, and tries to flee from Leavitt into an alley, but he is set upon by a group of street musicians who beat him to death. They also take Leavitt as a prisoner.

The musicians are ex-commandos and former comrades of Morrison, with whom they had served on a raid in Brittany in the war. The commander of the raid had been Meg's husband, Major Elgin. The men had been led to believe that Elgin knew about secreted treasure in a house in Brittany which he owned before the war, and they are desperate to get their hands on it. They want to find their former sergeant, Jack Havoc, who has recently escaped from prison, committed several murders, and who they believe knows where the treasure is. They had attacked Morrison because they suspected he was an accomplice of Havoc, and then captured Leavitt believing he was Havoc.

Still wearing their old uniforms, they have spent the past few years carving out a living as street musicians, begging from passersby. Realising that releasing Leavitt might open them to being charged for the murder of Morrison, they bind him up and keep him as a prisoner. He is rescued later by a beat constable, sent by the CID to investigate the squat while the musicians are out.

Leavitt returns to Meg and together they head to Brittany to find the treasure, having learned of its location from a message left by Major Elgin. Havoc, having united with his former comrades and also learned of the treasure's location, also travels to France, where he angrily discovers that when Major Elgin had spoken of his 'priceless' treasure, he had been referring to its artistic beauty rather than its monetary worth: it is a small statue of the Madonna. He is apprehended in a confrontation on the nearby cliffs with Leavitt and the French police.

== Cast ==
- Donald Sinden as Geoffrey Leavitt
- Muriel Pavlow as Meg Elgin
- Tony Wright as Jack Havoc
- Bernard Miles as Doll
- Alec Clunes as Assistant Commissioner Oates
- Laurence Naismith as the canon
- Christopher Rhodes as Detective Chief Inspector Luke
- Charles Victor as Will
- Thomas Heathcote as Rolly Gripper
- Sam Kydd as Tom Gripper
- Kenneth Griffith as gang member
- Gerald Harper as Duds Morrison
- Wensley Pithey as Detective Sergeant Pickett
- Stratford Johns as Police Constable
- Brian Wilde as Trumps
- Beatrice Varley as Lucy Cash
- Percy Herbert as Copper
- Dandy Nichols as stall-owner

== Production ==
The movie was one of several thrillers Rank made that year.

Roy Ward Baker was offered the job of directing by producer Leslie Parkin, who worked with him on Morning Departure. Margery Allingham was one of Baker's favourite authors. As screenwriter Änthony Pelissier was also writing a television special, Baker helped write the script. He later said Allingham "was a very bizarre writer. Her books appear to be very realistic and straightforward detective stories, thrillers and suspense. But she's not like Dorothy Sayers, she's right off on her own and there's a sort of bizarreness which is very difficult to catch. I didn't get it. I think I got some of it occasionally where a number of the character were just plain daft."

Baker felt the film "was a failure." He felt "One of the problems with the picture is that the central character doesn't appear until at least a third of the way through. It should be a man with an overwhelming personality, not macho but real strength, real evil and he is a determined villain."

Baker felt this role should have been played by someone like Jack Hawkins or Stanley Baker but John Davis insisted they use Tony Wright. He elaborated

Sometimes people get picked up for a part, a star part, in a good movie, and they’re just not right for it, and they can’t do it, and it ruins them for the rest of their lives. It blows it completely for them. Tony Wright did do, in fact, a lot of work after that, but he never really caught on as a major personality...It’s too bad, and it wrecked the film, and it wrecked this poor man’s career.

It was shot at Pinewood Studios with sets designed by the art director Jack Maxsted.

Baker said "it was an unsuccessful picture but it really was quite an important picture in my own development" as "it did me a lot of good in the studio... even during the making it did attract quite a lot of attention and publicity so it was more important than you would think given it was not a successful film. But there were a lot of things in it which were well done and well brought off."

Muriel Pavlov felt "the film didn’t quite come off, unfortunately. I didn’t think Tony Wright was sinister enough and I would like to have seen him and Donald Sinden reverse their roles. Tony had too much charm for the villain; he was too relaxed almost."

== Critical reception ==
The Monthly Film Bulletin wrote: "The opening sequences of this adaptation of Margery Allingham's enjoyably confused novel are full of promise. The fog-bound streets of London, the attempt by Morrison to blackmail Meg Elgin, the half-mad gang of street musicians and their thieves-kitchen hideout, evoke an authentically strange and eerie atmosphere. But with the appearance of the homicidal Jack Havoc, following a long and effective build-up, the film begins its marked deterioration into the commonplace. Regrettably, Tony Wright fails to convey the raw, exposed neurosis of the character, investing the part with more brawn than psychopathic insight. The rest of the playing is also highly variable, although there are several recognisable Allingham characters, notably the Scotland Yard men of Alec Clunes and Christopher Rhodes and the sinister Mrs. Cash, portrayed with considerable relish by Beatrice Varley."

Variety called it "An intriguing, nearly plausible Screenplay has been made... With a sterling cast, and not over complicated plot, the result is good general entertainment... Tony Wright is making his mark in the cold killer type of roles and this one fits him like a glove."

Filmink argued "The movie starts terrifically in a fog-drenched London but gets worse as it goes along, in part because of Wright’s performance."

Leslie Halliwell said: "Odd little melodrama with a complex plot and a different, Graham Greene-like atmosphere."

The Radio Times Guide to Films gave the film 3/5 stars, writing: "Margery Allingham's source novel provides a distinctly offbeat, metaphysical edge to this thriller. ... From its opening image of street musicians in the London fog, the film builds up a compelling atmosphere. "

== Bibliography ==
- Mayer, Geoff. Roy Ward Baker. Manchester University Press, 2004.
