= You Can't Keep the Change =

1940 thriller novel by Peter Cheyney

- First edition (UK)
- Author: Peter Cheyney
- Language: English
- Series: Slim Callaghan
- Genre: Thriller
- Publisher: William Collins, Sons (1940 UK); Dodd Mead (1944 US)
- Publication place: United Kingdom
- Media type: Print
- Pages: 262
- ISBN: 1471901637
- Preceded by: Dangerous Curves
- Followed by: It Couldn't Matter Less

You Can't Keep the Change is a 1940 thriller novel by the British writer Peter Cheyney. It is the third in his series of novels featuring the London private detective Slim Callaghan, a British version of the increasingly popular hardboiled American detectives.

== Plot ==
Slim Callaghan is called to Margraud Manor in Devon where valuable jewels have been stolen. His investigations take him to a shady nightclub in London haunted by the criminal classes.

== Bibliography ==
- Magill, Frank Northen. Critical Survey of Mystery and Detective Fiction: Authors, Volume 1. Salem Press, 1988.
- Server, Lee. Encyclopedia of Pulp Fiction Writers. Infobase Publishing, 2014. ISBN 0816045771.
