= Towards Zero (play) =

1956 play

- Original language: English
- Written by: Agatha Christie; Gerald Verner
- Genre: Thriller
- Setting: Lady Tressian's house, Cornwall

Premiere
- Date: 6 August 1956
- Place: Theatre Royal, Nottingham

Towards Zero is a 1956 thriller play by Agatha Christie and Gerald Verner and based on Christie's 1944 novel Towards Zero. It premiered at the Theatre Royal, Nottingham before transferring to the St James's Theatre in London's West End where it ran for 205 performances between 4 September 1956 and 2 March 1957. The London cast featured George Baker, Cyril Raymond, Frederick Leister, William Kendall, Max Brimmell, Michael Nightingale and Gillian Lind. The play features Superintendent Battle one of Christie's recurring characters. Reviews were favourable.

== Bibliography ==
- Kabatchnik, Amnon. Blood on the Stage, 1950-1975: Milestone Plays of Crime, Mystery, and Detection. Scarecrow Press, 2011.
- Wearing, J.P. The London Stage 1950–1959: A Calendar of Productions, Performers, and Personnel. Rowman & Littlefield, 2014.
