= Tides of Passion (1956 film) =

1956 film

- Directed by: Jean Stelli
- Written by: Antoine Blondin; Serge de Boissac
- Based on: La foire aux femmes by Gilbert Dupé
- Produced by: Evrard De Rouvre; Ayres D'Aguiar; Gilbert Dupé
- Starring: Etchika Choureau; Jean Danet; Dora Doll
- Cinematography: Jacques Mercanton
- Edited by: Jean Feyte
- Music by: René Sylviano
- Production companies: Véga Films; Gray-Film; Agence Générale Cinématographique; Compagnie Française Cinématographique
- Distributed by: La Société des Films Sirius
- Release date: 11 May 1956
- Running time: 88 minutes
- Countries: France; Italy
- Language: French

Tides of Passion (French: La foire aux femmes) is a 1956 French-Italian romantic drama film directed by Jean Stelli and starring Etchika Choureau, Jean Danet and Dora Doll. It was shot in Eastmancolor. Location filming took place around Le Vanneau and the port of La Rochelle. The film's sets were designed by the art director Robert Clavel.

== Cast ==
- Etchika Choureau as Ludvine
- Jean Danet as Jean-Pierre
- Alfred Adam as Armand Vignaud
- Dora Doll as Mariotte Borderet
- Elisa Lamotte as Michèle Vernay
- René Clermont as Gros-Jésus
- Juliette Faber as Jeanne Vichat
- Germaine Sablon as Mme Goudart
- Marie-Louise Godard as Louise Vichat
- Christine Langier as Lucie
- Claudine Bleuse as Rosette

== Bibliography ==
- Bessy, Maurice & Chirat, Raymond. Histoire du cinéma français: 1951-1955. Pygmalion, 1989.
- Chiti, Roberto & Poppi, Roberto. Dizionario del cinema italiano: Dal 1945 al 1959. Gremese Editore, 1991.
- Rège, Philippe. Encyclopedia of French Film Directors, Volume 1. Scarecrow Press, 2009.
