= Et par ici la sortie =

- Directed by: Willy Rozier
- Written by: Peter Cheyney (d'apres); Willy Rozier (as Xavier Vallier)
- Starring: Tony Wright; Dominique Wilms
- Cinematography: Michel Rocca
- Edited by: Madeleine Crétolle
- Music by: Georges Van Parys; Jean Yatove
- Color process: Black and white
- Production company: Sport-Films
- Distributed by: Cocinor
- Release date: 3 March 1957
- Running time: 87 minutes
- Country: France
- Language: French

Et par ici la sortie (And Through Here the Exit) is a 1957 French comedy thriller film directed by Willy Rozier starring Tony Wright and Dominique Wilms.

Wright played the role one more time in Callaghan remet ça (1961).

== Plot ==
Carlos, a weapons trader, is struck by his resemblance to a certain Slim. Wishing to take advantage of this situation, the mafioso asked the latter to be the commander of his ship

== Cast ==
- Tony Wright as Slim Maden / Carlos
- Dominique Wilms as Myrna de Maripasula
- Dany Dauberson as Florina, Singer
- Marcel Charvey as Gaëtan
- Mario David as Honoré
- Jean-Roger Caussimon as Picatellos (as Caussimon)
- Bob Ingarao as René
- Maurice Bénard as Himself (as Bénard)
- Rico Sarroga as Le danseur(as Ryco Sarroga)
- Pierrette Caillol as Himself (as Pierrette Caillot)
- Jean Droze as Himself (as Droze)
- Roger Saget as Alexandre Cherlikoff(as Saget)
- Pascale Roberts as Esméralda
