= Seven Thunders (film) =

- Directed by: Hugo Fregonese
- Written by: John Baines
- Based on: novel by Rupert Croft-Cooke
- Produced by: Daniel M. Angel assoc John Brabourne
- Starring: Stephen Boyd; James Robertson Justice; Kathleen Harrison; Tony Wright
- Cinematography: Wilkie Cooper
- Edited by: John Shirley
- Music by: Antony Hopkins
- Production companies: Angel Productions; Dial Limited
- Distributed by: Rank Film Distributors; Allied Artists Pictures (US)
- Release date: 4 September 1957
- Running time: 100 minutes
- Country: United Kingdom
- Language: English

Seven Thunders (US title: The Beasts of Marseilles) is a 1957 black and white British film regarding Marseille in the Second World War. It was directed by Hugo Fregonese and starring Stephen Boyd, James Robertson Justice, Kathleen Harrison, Tony Wright and Anna Gaylor. It is about two escaped prisoners of war and is based on a novel of the same name by the writer Rupert Croft-Cooke.

== Plot ==
In 1943, Dave, an officer, and Jim, escape from separate prison camps and are paired together by the underground. They are taken to Marseille by a fishing boat captain to wait in the Old Port Quarter for the right opportunity to try for Britain. While they wait, local woman Lise falls in love with Dave. He is attracted to her, but is engaged.

As a sub-plot, Emile Blanchard refers those desperate to leave France to his associate Dr. Martout, unaware Martout is a serial killer who grows rich from his crimes (this character parallels the real life French poisoner Marcel Petiot). Jewish undertaker Schlip and ex-Vichy official Bourdin become his latest victims during the film.

Given an ultimatum by his displeased superiors to do something about the French Resistance, the German military commander of the city decides to evacuate and demolish the crime-infested Old Quarter, where Dave and Jim are hiding, with only two hours' warning. Dave wants to wait for the fishing captain, but Jim chooses to try Dr. Martout. When the captain does show up, Dave goes to fetch Jim, barely saving him from becoming Martout's 100th victim. Martout escapes in his car, but in his haste, crashes and is killed. With buildings blowing up right and left, the pair make their way, with Lise's help, to the boat and freedom. Aboard the boat, Dave and Lise embrace.

== Cast ==
- Stephen Boyd as Dave
- James Robertson Justice as Dr. Martout
- Kathleen Harrison as Mme. Abou, a helpful Englishwoman married to a Frenchman
- Tony Wright as Jim
- Anna Gaylor as Lise
- Eugene Deckers as Emile Blanchard
- Rosalie Crutchley as Therese Blanchard, Emile's wife. She tries to commit suicide when her young daughter is killed by mistake.
- Katherine Kath as Mme. Parfait
- James Kenney as Eric Triebel, a young German corporal who accidentally shoots the Blanchards' child
- Anton Diffring as Colonel Trautman
- Martin Miller as Schlip
- George Coulouris as Bourdin
- Carl Duering as Major Grautner
- Richard Marner as German soldier
- Marne Maitland as Hassan
- Edric Connor as Abou

== Production ==
It was part of a two picture deal Daniel Angel signed with Rank the other being Carve Her Name with Pride. Stephen Boyd was loaned to Rank by 20th Century Fox. Filming started in March 1957.

The movie was one of several that the Rank Organisation filmed overseas at the time. The movie was made through Angel's company.

It was shot at Pinewood Studios and on location in Marseille. The film's sets were designed by the art director Arthur Lawson.

The associate producer, John Brabourne, got along so well with director Hugo Fregonese that they collaborated again on Harry Black.

== Reception ==
Variety said "Despite some loose ends and improbabilities it adds up to sound entertainment with a strong climax that will have patrons eagerly urging on the heroes to safety. Seven Thunders suggests’ solid home-market business, but neither the wartime setting in Europe nor the strong but far from starry cast are likely to excite U. S. patrons overmuch. "

Filmink called it "a fascinating misfire, with Wright and Boyd playing escaped POWs in wartime Marseilles, dealing with a serial killing doctor (James Robertson Justice) – either plot of which might’ve made a decent movie, but which mix uneasily."
