= Your Turn, Callaghan =

1955 film

- Directed by: Willy Rozier
- Written by: Willy Rozier
- Based on: Sorry You've Been Troubled by Peter Cheyney
- Produced by: Willy Rozier
- Starring: Tony Wright; Lysiane Rey; Colette Ripert
- Cinematography: Michel Rocca
- Edited by: Madeleine Crétolle
- Music by: Jean Yatove
- Production company: Sport-Films
- Distributed by: Cocinor; Atlantis (US)
- Release dates: 29 March 1955; 1961 (US)
- Running time: 88 minutes
- Country: France
- Language: French

Your Turn, Callaghan (French: À toi de jouer... Callaghan) is a 1955 French thriller film directed by Willy Rozier and starring Tony Wright, Lysiane Rey and Colette Ripert. It is an adaptation of the 1942 novel Sorry You've Been Troubled by British writer Peter Cheyney featuring the private detective Slim Callaghan. It was the first in a series of four films featuring English actor Wright as Callaghan, followed by More Whiskey for Callaghan.

It was released in the US in 1961 and England in 1962 as The Amazing Mr Callaghan, on a double bill with The Prisoners of the Congo.

== Synopsis ==
After a ship sinks with its cargo, an insurance claim is made by the owners. Callaghan is hired by the insurance company to find out whether the accident was genuine or deliberate.

== Cast ==
- Tony Wright as Slim Callaghan
- Lysiane Rey as Dolorès
- Colette Ripert as Manon Gardel
- Paul Cambo as Nicky Storata
- Robert Berri as Raoul de Bois-Joli dit le Vicomte
- Yorick Royan as Denise Gardel
- Roger Blin as Wladimir
- Martine Alexis as Ketty
- Raymond Cordy as Le portier
- Paul Demange as Le barman
- Maurice Bénard as Boutillon
- Robert Burnier as Nicholls
- Henri Arius as Le commissaire Merlin
- Gil Delamare as Léon

== Production ==
Tony Wright was a British actor then in Paris. He was given the lead after the original star cast, Charles Chaplin Jnr, pulled out. Wright said he received publicity in Paris saving the life of someone who tried to commit suicide. He visited New York in December 1960 to promote the film's US release.

== Bibliography ==
- Goble, Alan. The Complete Index to Literary Sources in Film. Walter de Gruyter, 1999.
- Rège, Philippe. Encyclopedia of French Film Directors, Volume 1. Scarecrow Press, 2009.
