= The Feminine Touch (1956 film) =

1956 British film by Pat Jackson

- UK quad format cinema poster
- Directed by: Pat Jackson
- Screenplay by: W. P. Lipscomb (uncredited); Richard Mason (uncredited)
- Based on: A Lamp Is Heavy; 1950 novel by Sheila Mackay Russell
- Produced by: Michael Balcon associate Jack Rix
- Starring: George Baker; Belinda Lee; Delphi Lawrence
- Cinematography: Paul Beeson
- Edited by: Peter Bezencenet
- Music by: Clifton Parker
- Production company: Ealing Studios
- Distributed by: J. Arthur Rank Film Distributors
- Release date: 27 March 1956 (UK)
- Running time: 91 minutes
- Country: United Kingdom
- Language: English

The Feminine Touch (Canada: A Lamp Is Heavy, U.S.:The Gentle Touch) is a 1956 colour British drama film directed by Pat Jackson and starring George Baker, Belinda Lee and Delphi Lawrence. It was the last feature film to be filmed in three-strip Technicolor and one of the last films made by Ealing under the umbrella of Rank.

== Plot ==
The film follows five very different student nurses during their first year of training at a fictional NHS hospital in London called St. Augustine's Hospital, where they live in a dormitory. However, of the five, the main focus is Susan.

Susan is reserved and rather naive; Pat is older and rather cynical; Maureen is Irish; Ann is a former public school girl; and Liz comes from a working class background. As they get to know each other, they bond in the face of the challenges of their work.

Susan falls in love with Dr Jim Alcott. She is tempted to leave nursing to go with Jim to Canada despite his reluctance, and manages to persuade him, but after helping a patient who tried to commit suicide, she then decides not to go. However, after a talk with the matron, who reveals something from her own experience, she decides she will join Jim in going to Canada.

When it emerges that Pat stayed out all night with one of the doctors, she faces instant dismissal, until she reveals that she has been married for a month. Although that is also against the rules, Susan and the other nurses protest to the matron that that is morally better than unmarried nurses sneaking out and having clandestine affairs. Matron sympathises but says the final decision is up to the hospital's Board of Governors.

== Main cast ==
- George Baker as Dr Jim Alcott
- Belinda Lee as Susan Richards
- Delphi Lawrence as Pat Martin
- Adrienne Corri as Maureen O'Brien
- Henryetta Edwards as Anne Bowland
- Barbara Archer as Liz Jenkins
- Diana Wynyard as Matron
- Joan Haythorne as Home Sister
- Beatrice Varley as Sister Snow
- Constance Fraser as Assistant Matron
- Vivienne Drummond as Second-Year Nurse
- Christopher Rhodes as Dr Ted Russell
- Richard Leech as Casualty doctor
- Newton Blick as Lofty
- Dandy Nichols as Ward Maid
- Mark Daly as Gardener
- Mandy Miller as Jessie (billed as Mandy)
- Dorothy Alison as The suicide
- Joss Ambler as Mr Bateman

Canadian poster, with the title A Lamp is Heavy.

== Original novel ==
The film was based on the 1950 book The Lamp is Heavy by Canadian Sheila Russell, who worked as a nurse in Edmonton, Alberta and married a doctor in 1947. The novel was published in the Commonwealth in 1954 and sold 75,000 copies over five years. "I'm not surprised that there is a change in title", said Russell. "After all, in England the 'lamp' is still pretty heavy for nurses."

== Production ==
Michael Balcon of Ealing Studios wanted to make a hospital film but Sir John Davis of Rank was reluctant; eventually Balcon managed to get approval for this movie.

In December 1954 it was announced Iain MacCormick had written a script.

It was the first Ealing movie directed by Pat Jackson, who had made an earlier film about nursing, White Corridors (1951). It was one of the last pair of films made at Ealing Studios, which had been sold to the BBC, and one of the last Ealing movies under the nine-year relationship between Rank and Ealing. (Ealing would move to MGM studios, make several more movies, then be wound up.)

It was the last feature film to be shot in three-strip Technicolor, utilising Technicolor camera DE13, one of a batch of Technicolor cameras built in the UK by Newall Engineering.

It was an early star role for Belinda Lee, one of several "sensible girl" parts she played for Rank.

Film rights were bought by Rank in early 1955. Filming began in late June 1955 at Pinewood Studios and on location at Guy's Hospital.

== Reception ==
Variety called the film "worthwhile, and as a piece of romantic entertainment, it is more than adequate. Pic has valuable exploitation angles which should help returns in the domestic market ... yarn has few comedy touches as well as strong dramatic angles ... Cast is competent without being standout. Miss Lee, a handsome blonde, is rapidly improving as an actress."

The Monthly Film Bulletin said "this latest example of nurse recruitment by film adds little to what has been said by previous productions of this kind."

The Observer said it was "not very good drama, I'm afraid."

Leslie Halliwell reviewed the film as: "Portmanteau soap opera of no absorbing interest".

David Quinlan wrote "Episodic tribute to nursing profession has too much soft soap, not enough meat. Very good colour camerawork though."
