= The Adventurer of Chad =

1953 film by Willy Rozier

- Directed by: Willy Rozier
- Written by: Willy Rozier
- Produced by: Willy Rozier
- Starring: Madeleine Lebeau; Jean Danet; Tania Fédor
- Cinematography: Michel Rocca
- Edited by: Augustine Richard
- Music by: Jean Yatove
- Production company: Sport-Films
- Distributed by: Cocinor
- Release date: 6 November 1953
- Running time: 90 minutes
- Country: France
- Language: French

The Adventurer of Chad (French: L'aventurière du Tchad) is a 1953 French drama film directed by Willy Rozier and starring Madeleine Lebeau, Jean Danet and Tania Fédor.

== Synopsis ==
After gambling away a stolen diamond bracelet, Alain de Blomette is sent away by his father to Africa. There, he works on a plantation, and meets Fanny. The latter's behavior ends up causing a fight between Alain and his rival, during which Fanny is killed. Alain disappears into the forest, and begins a new life in the ivory trade.

== Cast ==
- Madeleine Lebeau as Fanny Lacour
- Jean Danet as Alain de Blomette
- Jacques Castelot
- Simone Bach
- Tania Fédor as Marjorie Kling
- Jean Clarieux
- Willy Rozier as Inspecteur Grimber

== Bibliography ==
- Rège, Philippe. Encyclopedia of French Film Directors, Volume 1. Scarecrow Press, 2009.
