= Dangerous Curves (play) =

1953 play

- Written by: Gerald Verner
- Original language: English
- Genre: Thriller
- Setting: London, present day

Premiere
- Date premiered: 14 April 1953
- Place premiered: Garrick Theatre, London

Dangerous Curves is a 1953 thriller play by the British writer Gerald Verner. It is adapted from the 1939 novel of the same title by Peter Cheyney featuring the private detective Slim Callaghan. It followed the success of Verner's 1952 stage play Meet Mr. Callaghan. It premiered at the Garrick Theatre in London's West End, where the previous play had been staged, and ran for 53 performances between 14 April and 11 June 1953. The cast included Terence De Marney as Callaghan, Shaw Taylor, Stephen Dartnell and Paul Whitsun-Jones.

== Bibliography ==
- Kabatchnik, Amnon. Blood on the Stage, 1950-1975: Milestone Plays of Crime, Mystery, and Detection. Scarecrow Press, 2011.
- Wearing, J.P. The London Stage 1950–1959: A Calendar of Productions, Performers, and Personnel. Rowman & Littlefield, 2014.
