= Delphi Lawrence =

British actress (1932–2002)

- Born: Delphi Cajetana Holzman; 23 March 1932; Hampstead, London, England
- Died: 11 April 2002 (aged 70); Northport, New York, U.S.
- Occupation: Actress
- Years active: 1952–1975, 1990

Delphi Lawrence (23 March 1932 – 11 April 2002) was an English actress. She was educated at Halidon House School in Slough, Berkshire, whilst living in Colnbrook.

Born to Barbara Yvonne (née Enever) and Louis Holzman, who married in 1930, she was of Hungarian ancestry on her father's side. She trained as a concert pianist before becoming an actress, training at RADA and graduating in 1949. She made her first film in 1952 and, over the next decade, she established a following in British films. She graduated to lead roles but almost exclusively in "B" films.

== Career ==
In 1962, she appeared in episode 11 of The Saint ('The Man Who Was Lucky') as Cora. One of her other prominent TV roles was around the same time, in 1961, where she played the Countess in episode six of the TV historical adventure series Sir Francis Drake ('The English Dragon').

In 1966, she moved to the United States, where she began to appear in films and television. Her credits included Voyage to the Bottom of the Sea, playing Julietta in 'Escape from Venice'; The Wild Wild West, playing Lucretia Posey in 'The Night of the Poisonous Posey'; and The Man from U.N.C.L.E as Olivia Willis in 'The J for Judas Affair', among others. By the end of the 1960s her roles began to decrease in frequency and importance and in 1973 she retired. She made a brief return in 1975 in the Broadway production of The Constant Wife, playing the sister of Ingrid Bergman's character.

She appeared as Vera Charles in various touring productions of Mame, opposite such stars as Susan Hayward, Celeste Holm, Ann Sothern, and Juliet Prowse. The last of these was in 1990, opposite Prowse. She died 12 years later, in 2002, aged 70, from undisclosed causes.

== Selected filmography ==
- Blood Orange (1953) – Chelsea, a model
- Murder by Proxy (1954) – Linda (uncredited)
- Meet Mr. Callaghan (1954) – Effie Perkins
- Duel in the Jungle (1954) – Pan American Girl
- The Gold Express (1955) – Pearl
- Barbados Quest (1955) – Jean Larson
- Doublecross (1956) – Anna Krassin
- The Feminine Touch (1956) – Pat
- It's Never Too Late (1956) – Mrs. Madge Dixon
- Strangers' Meeting (1957) – Margot Sanders
- Just My Luck (1957) – Miss Daviot
- Blind Spot (1958) – Yvonne Dubar
- The Son of Robin Hood (1958) – Sylvia
- Dial 999 (TV series) (1959) – Julie Nielson – (episode "The Mechanical Watchman") – (filmed 1958)
- Dial 999 (TV series) (1959) – Pauline – (episode "Thames Division") – (filmed 1958)
- Too Many Crooks (1959) – Secretary
- The Man Who Could Cheat Death (1959) – Margo Philippe
- The Man Who Finally Died (1959) – Lisa Deutsch
- Danger Man (1960-62) – Stella Delroy – (episode "View from the Villa")
- Cone of Silence (1960) – Joyce Mitchell
- The Greeneyed Elephant (1960) (Danish title: Elefanter på loftet) – Lisa
- Beat Girl (1960) – Greta (uncredited)
- Edgar Wallace Mysteries, (episode "The Fourth Square") (1961) – Nina Stewart
- Seven Keys (1961) – Natalie Worth
- Scotland Yard (film series), (episode "The Square Mile Murder") (1961) – Mrs. Possner
- The List of Adrian Messenger (1963) – Airport Stewardess (uncredited)
- Farewell Performance (1963) – Janice Marlon
- Edgar Wallace Mysteries, (episode "On the Run (1963 film)") (1963) – Yvonne
- Gideon's Way (episode "To Catch a Tiger") (1964) – Jane Kennet
- Bunny Lake Is Missing (1965) – 1st Mother
- The Wild Wild West (episode "The Night of the Poisonous Posey") (1966) — Lucrece Posey
- The Last Challenge (1967) – Marie Webster
- Cops and Robbers (1973) – rich lady (final film role)

== Sources ==
- Quinlan, David. Quinlan's Film Stars Batsford Books, 1996. ISBN 0-7134-7751-2
