= Uneasy Terms =

- Directed by: Vernon Sewell
- Written by: Peter Cheyney
- Based on: novel Uneasy Terms by Peter Cheyney
- Produced by: Louis H. Jackson
- Starring: Michael Rennie; Moira Lister; Faith Brook
- Cinematography: Ernest Palmer
- Edited by: Monica Kimick
- Music by: Hans May
- Production company: British National Films
- Distributed by: Pathé Pictures International (UK)
- Release dates: 1 June 1948 (London, England)
- Running time: 91 minutes
- Country: United Kingdom
- Language: English

Uneasy Terms is a 1948 British crime thriller film directed by Vernon Sewell and starring Michael Rennie, Moira Lister and Faith Brook. It was written by Peter Cheyney based on his 1946 novel of the same title.

== Premise ==
Slim Callaghan is a private eye whose client Colonel Stenhurst, is murdered, leaving behind a trail of suspects. Viola, the eldest of the Colonel's three stepdaughters, is the prime suspect, but after wading through clues and romance, Callaghan corners the real culprit.

== Cast ==
- Michael Rennie as Slim Callaghan
- Moira Lister as Corinne Alardyse
- Faith Brook as Viola Alardyse
- Joy Shelton as Effie
- Patricia Goddard as Patricia Alardyse
- Barry Jones as Inspector Gringall
- Marie Ney as Honoria Wymering
- Paul Carpenter as Windy Nicholls
- Nigel Patrick as Lucien Donnelly
- Sydney Tafler as Maysin
- J.H. Roberts as Sallins
- Joan Carroll as Matron

== Production ==
Cheyney was a best selling author at the time. Vernon Sewell wanted to make a film of Cheyney's Dark Duet but was assigned Uneasy Terms instead, the first in the Slim Callahan novels.

Sewell said Cheyney "had complete charge of casting and costumes, and script of course. He had choice of the world's stars." According to Sewell Cheyney insisted on Michael Rennie who the director thought "wasn't right for it". Swell also said that Cheyney also did not write the script. "I'm left on the, sometimes on the set with no script at all! Michael Rennie and I had to sit down and write the very next day's work! The film was pretty awful."

The movie was meant to be the first in a series.

Filming took place in November–December 1947. There were two units to shoot exteriors, one at Maida Vale another under Bob Asher filming on Northolt and Heathrow Airports.

== Release ==
Sewell said when the film opened Cheyney insisted it would get good reviews "because the press daren't knock me!" but the reviews were bad. "And then he died! So we never made any more. That was the one Peter Cheyney film ever made. No one has made one since. Poor old Peter."

== Reception ==
Variety felt Cheyney "should have allowed experts to adapt it and write the screenplay... an unexciting picture. As Slim, Michael Rennie strives hard to give the detective some character, but is unsuccessful. All the others, with the excepiion of Paul Carpenter, who is worth noting, are stock-in-trade puppets. Production, is reminiscent of ancient silent melodramas."

The Monthly Film Bulletin wrote: "In order to turn a best-selling thriller from the pen of craftsman Cheyney into a stale, unexciting film it requires a considerable lack of imagination, bad casting and direction. Unfortunately, Uneasy Terms is disgraced by all these faults. The story is involved, and the latter part of the film is spent in trying to sort out the complications caused by the untidy script. Michael Rennie is tall and broad but completely unconvincing as Slim Callaghan. Moira Lister and Faith Brook are characterless as Viola and Corinne. Towards the end of the film a fight takes place, staged by Micky Wood, and for a few lusty moments a spark is kindled. It dies down, leaving the cold ash of an insignificant production."

Kine Weekly wrote: "Michael Rennie is a muscular Slim and Barry Jones an effective foil as Gringall, but Moira Lister and Faith Brook are never at ease as Corinne and Viola. The supporting players are equally undistinguished. ... The first hour is terribly complicated and the last three reels are occupied with sorting things out. The explanations are punctuated with a lusty fight, but even so the film fails to amount to much. Desultory presentation takes the shine off Cheyney."

Sky Movies wrote, "Peter Cheyney's detective Slim Callaghan has rarely translated well to the screen, But this Vernon Sewell-directed thriller is one of the better efforts, thanks largely to a quality cast that also includes Barry Jones, Joy Shelton and Paul Carpenter."
