= Dangerous Curves (video game) =

1995 video game

- Japanese arcade flyer
- Developer: Taito
- Publisher: Taito
- Designer: Hiroyuki Sakawa
- Composer: Hideki Takahagi
- Platform: Arcade
- Release: JP: July 1995; WW: October 1995
- Genre: Racing
- Modes: Single-player, multiplayer
- Arcade system: JC System Type-C

Dangerous Curves (Note: Japanese: デンジャラス カーブス, Hepburn: Denjarasu Kābusu) is an arcade racing game developed and published by Taito. The arcade cabinet is constructed to allow players to choose between simulating either a car or a motorcycle and then race other vehicles on a variety of courses.

Dangerous Curves was designed by Taito veteran Hiroyuki Sakawa and was the first game to utilize the company's JC System Type-C arcade hardware. The game was released worldwide in 1995 and was considered mediocre by critics.

== Gameplay ==
Dangerous Curves is a racing simulator. The arcade cabinet is uniquely constructed with side-by-side 25-inch screen displays to give players a choice between controlling either a car with a steering wheel or a motorcycle using a motorcycle seat peripheral. Players then race other vehicles, controlled by other humans or a computer-AI opponents. The game simulates the advantages and disadvantages of these competing vehicles, such as a motorcycle's ability quickly make tight corners and a car's use of power to catch up on straightaways. Players can use an automatic or a six-speed manual transmission. The game features multiple viewing perspectives. Driving environments include public highways, mountain passes, and a road along the coast. Two arcade units can be connected together to allow up to four players simultaneously.

== Development and release ==
Dangerous Curves was developed by Taito. It was designed by Hiroyuki Sakawa, who joined the company in 1982 as an arcade hardware technician before becoming a game planner. He worked on a number of titles before directing the 1989 racing simulation WGP: Real Racing Feeling, which was designed around Sakawa's intricate study of motorcycles. Dangerous Curves was the first game to use Taito's JC System Type-C, which allowed for improved handling of 3D polygons over its previous efforts. After Dangerous Curves, Sakawa headed development on the Battle Gear series of car racing simulators beginning with Side by Side in 1996. This first entry also used the JC System.

Dangerous Curves was unveiled at the Amusement Machine Operators' Union (AOU) trade show in Tokyo in February 1995 and was presented at the Japan Amusement Machine and Marketing Association (JAMMA) and Amusement & Music Operators Association Show (AMOA) shows later that year. These appearances pitted the game against motorcycle arcade simulations from Taito's rivals including Namco's Cyber Cycles and Sega's Cool Riders. Dangerous Curves was released in Japan in July 1995 and internationally the following October.

The music and sound composer for Dangerous Curves was Hideki Takahagi. It was the first project he worked on for Taito that was not cancelled. The game's official soundtrack containing 16 songs was released in Japan by Pony Canyon on October 20, 1995. Music from the game was also included on the compilation Taito Digital Sound Archive Arcade Vol.3, released by Wave Master on May 27, 2015.

== Reception ==
Sparse critical reception for Dangerous Curves has been overall mediocre. During the game's second rollout in late 1995, Edge considered it "average" when compared to the offerings of its competitors Namco and Sega. Next Generation called the graphics and gameplay "solid" but stated, "Besides the six extensive stages and rendered polygon backgrounds, the mediocre set of sharp turns and sober opponents leaves this game an enjoyable but disappointing attempt." The Spanish magazine HobbyConsolas and the French magazine Consoles + considered the visuals "amazing" and "dazzling" respectively.
