= The Night Is Ours (1953 film) =

1953 film by Jean Stelli

- Directed by: Jean Stelli
- Written by: François Chalais; Henry Kistemaeckers (play); Henri Vendesse
- Produced by: Henri Ullmann
- Starring: Simone Renant; Jean Danet; Jean Murat
- Cinematography: Nicolas Hayer
- Edited by: Paul Cayatte
- Music by: René Sylviano
- Production company: Compagnie Nouvelle du Cinéma
- Distributed by: Cora Films
- Release date: 14 May 1953
- Running time: 90 minutes
- Country: France
- Language: French

The Night Is Ours (French: La nuit est à nous) is a 1953 French drama film directed by Jean Stelli and starring Simone Renant, Jean Danet and Jean Murat. It was a remake of the 1929 German film The Night Belongs to Us. The film's sets were designed by the art director Jacques Colombier.

== Synopsis ==
Alain Brécourt, a former pilot during the Second World War, meets Françoise, a young test pilot. The two fall in love but she is disturbed to discover that he is already married to a singer. Despite his assurances that they have separated and there is nothing between them, a distraught Françoise attempts to commit suicide during a flight.

== Cast ==
- Simone Renant as Françoise Clozat
- Jean Danet as Alain Brécourt
- Jean Murat as Le colonel Gribaldi
- Virginia Keiley as Diana
- Jean Debucourt as Besagne
- Germaine de France as Marthe
- Christian Lude as L'imprésario de Diana
- Huguette Vergne]as La secrétaire
- Paul Pavel
- Paul Barge as Le mécanicien
- Jacques Denoël as Un pilote
- Jacques Butin
- Roger Bontemps as Le radio
- Jean Berton as Le docteur
- Jacques Ferreol
- René Hell as L'autre mécanicien
- Jean-Louis Le Goff as Toto

== See also ==
- The Night Belongs to Us (1929)
- The Night Is Ours (1930)

== Bibliography ==
- Bessy, Maurice & Chirat, Raymond. Histoire du cinéma français: 1951–1955. Pygmalion, 1989.
- Oscherwitz, Dayna & Higgins, MaryEllen . The A to Z of French Cinema. Scarecrow Press, 2009.
