= Gerald Verner =

English writer (1897–1980)

Gerald Verner (1897–1980) was a writer of thrillers, writing more than 120 novels translated into over 35 languages. Many of these were adapted into radio serials, stage plays and films.

== Biography ==
Verner was born John Robert Stuart Pringle in Streatham, London on 31 January 1897 and died at Broadstairs, Kent, England on 16 September 1980.

In his early days he used to write entirely under the name of Donald Stuart, including 44 stories for the Sexton Blake Library. He also wrote 6 stories for Union Jack and 3 for The Thriller under this pseudonym as well as two stage plays and two films. His other pseudonyms include Derwent Steele, Thane Leslie and Nigel Vane. In the 1930s he wrote for the magazines The Thriller and Detective Weekly. With changed names of titles and the protagonists many of these stories were recycled as novels for the publisher Wright & Brown. Some of his novels have been reprinted as recently as 2012 (The 'Q' Squad). Verner's style was heavily influenced by that of Edgar Wallace. He was a favourite of the Duke of Windsor, who was presented with a specially bound set of 15 of Verner's thrillers.

His 1949 novel The Whispering Woman was adapted into a 1953 film Noose for a Lady. He also wrote stage plays including adaptations of Peter Cheyney's The Urgent Hangman into Meet Mr. Callaghan (1952) (filmed in 1954), Cheyney's Dangerous Curves into Dangerous Curves (1953) and the Agatha Christie thriller Towards Zero (1956).
