= Trevor Reid =

English actor (1908–1965)

- in Meet Mr. Callaghan (1954)
- Born: 25 January 1908; Liverpool, England
- Died: 16 April 1965 (aged 57); London, England
- Occupation: Actor

Trevor Reid (25 January 1908 – 16 April 1965) was an English actor. He was born in Liverpool, the son of David Reid and Grace Adelaide (née Thomas) at 25 Cheltenham Avenue near to Sefton Park. After leaving school he worked for four years at the Liverpool Cotton Exchange, then joined the Liverpool Playhouse company in 1929 where he stayed for two seasons under the direction of William Armstrong. He served with the Royal Artillery in the Second World War and after discharge resumed his acting career. He acted in 47 films from 1938 to 1965. He died at age 57 in London.

== Selected filmography ==
- Dangerous Cargo (1954) - Watson
- Meet Mr. Callaghan (1954) - Det. Inspector Gringall
- Delayed Action (1954) - Goodman (uncredited)
- Radio Cab Murder (1954) - Commissioner
- The Gilded Cage (1955) - Inspector Brace
- The Hornet's Nest (1955) - Detective Sergeant Filson
- The Narrowing Circle (1956) -Inspector 'Dumb' Crambo
- Private's Progress (1956) - Adjutant (uncredited)
- Bond of Fear (1956) - Dover Police Inspector
- Behind the Headlines (1956) - Bunting
- Satellite in the Sky (1956) - Simmons - Technician (uncredited)
- How to Murder a Rich Uncle (1957) - Inspector Harris
- A Question of Adultery (1958) - Reporter (uncredited)
- Bobbikins (1959) - Cavendish (uncredited)
- Piccadilly Third Stop (1960) - Bride's Father
- Strip Tease Murder (1961) - Inspector Forbes
- Mary Had a Little... (1961) - Dr. Liversidge
- Dangerous Afternoon (1961) - Inspector Craven
- The Longest Day (1962) - General Sir Bernard L. Montgomery (uncredited)
- The Fast Lady (1962) - Examiner
- Tomorrow at Ten (1963) - Q detective
- Night Train to Paris (1964) - Policeman on train
- Walk a Tightrope (1964) - Inspector MacMitchell (final film role)
