= Tony Wright (actor) =

English actor (1925–1986)

- Born: Paul Anthony Wright; 10 December 1925; London, England, UK
- Died: 6 June 1986 (aged 60); Wandsworth, London, England, UK
- Years active: 1953–1981
- Spouses: Janet Munro (m. 1956; div. 1959): Shirley Clark

Paul Anthony "Tony" Wright (10 December 1925 – 6 June 1986) was an English film actor. The son of actor Hugh E. Wright, he was a Rank Organisation contract player for some years.

In October 1956, John Davis, managing director of Rank, announced him as one of the actors under contract to Rank that Davis thought would become an international star.

He married actress Janet Munro in 1957, though the couple were divorced in 1960. He played the role of London-based private detective Slim Callaghan in several French films. Filmink wrote:

Of all the odd “shooting comet” stars of the British film industry, Tony Wright is perhaps the oddest. Limited training. Limited ability. Even his blonde hair was unusual. Yet, for a short time there, he had the lead in a franchise, the backing of Britain’s biggest studio and the love of the most talented young actress in the country. Then it went away.

== Biography ==
Wright's father was an actor, Hugh E. Wright, but originally Wright wanted to be a farmer. He served for two years in the Navy and then moved to South Africa where he tried chicken farming and gold mining before going into theatre.

Wright appeared in a TV version of Noël Coward's This Happy Breed (1952). He was a boxer in The Flanagan Boy (1953) for Hammer. He went to Germany with a stage show then on the way back went through France where his ability speaking fluent French helped him be cast as Slim Callaghan in Your Turn, Callaghan (1955) after the original star cast, Charles Chaplin Jnr, pulled out.

Wright made a sequel, More Whisky for Callaghan. He guest starred on shows like Paris Precinct, Colonel March of Scotland Yard and Sherlock Holmes.

=== Rank Organisation ===
For Rank, Wright supported Frankie Howerd in Jumping for Joy (1956). This led to a long-term contract with Rank started with two Roy Ward Baker films Jacqueline (1956) and Tiger in the Smoke (1956). According to Filmlink "Wright wasn’t much of an actor, but was a good looking guy with a nice build, who didn’t mind taking his shirt off – these were a dime a dozen in Hollywood, but not so common in Britain where male actors tended to be pasty."

Another writer said "he looks like being the most virile discovery for British films since Anthony Steel. And our films need his type very badly - every inch a man without being an Adonis, well built, intelligent, much travelled and with a great deal of the Kenneth More type of humour about him." Another writer dubbed him "the latest tough man 'hope' of British films."

Roy Ward Baker, who directed both films, says John Davis forced him to use Wright in Tiger in the Smoke. Baker calls Wright a "charming young man" who was "just miscast. It didn't do him any good, it probably set him back for years. "

Back in France Wright was Callaghan again in Et par ici la sortie (1957). Rank used him for Seven Thunders (1957). When he married Janet Munro, Rank's head of production Earl St John gave her away.

Wright starred in The Spaniard's Curse (1958),In the Wake of a Stranger and The House in Marsh Road.

=== Later career ===
In May 1958 it was reported he was terminating his seven-year contract with Rank because he "wasn't getting enough work". His wife Janet Munro later wrote about Wright:

He was insecure because of his acting. He wasn’t a very good actor, but he did have a magnificent physique and exciting looks. Like all Mr. Beefcakes, his time in the movies was coming to its end. He had passed his heyday. Looks fade so quickly and I could tell he wasn't as handsome now as he was in his earlier movie. Nor was his body as supple... There was little talent to back up Tony’s looks, and I felt deep compassion for him.

In June 1958 Wright was taken to hospital after having taken an overdose of sleeping tablets. He returned to hospital a few days later, also ill, but again recovered.

Wright had a support part in Broth of a Boy (1959), The Rough and the Smooth, And the Same to You, Attempt to Kill and Faces in the Dark. He was in The Amazing Mr Callaghan in France in 1960.

In 1959 he appeared on stage in The Woman on the Star.

He made Journey into Nowhere in South Africa in 1962 and guest starred for several episodes on the serial Compact.

In 1965 he appeared in The Saint (S4, E3: episode entitled "The Crooked Ring") as champion boxer Steve Nelson, due to fight a cheating character 'The Angel'. Unfortunately Steve breaks his arm and Simon Templar steps into the ring in his place. It is a knock out win to The Saint. In S6, E14, "Where The Money Is", he played Largo, a heavy.

Editor Chris Kelly later said Wright "didn't really amount to much to be totally honest. Tony had a very sad demise that's for sure. Alcohol based of course."

== Personal life and death ==
Wright was officially divorced from Janet Munro in 1960. The same year he announced his engagement to Shirley Clark, daughter of writer Lesley Storm. They married in September. In January 1962 Clark gave birth to their daughter, while Wright was filming in South Africa.

Wright died on 7 June 1986 after a fall at his London home.

== Selected filmography ==
- The Flanagan Boy (1953) - Johnny Flanagan
- Your Turn, Callaghan (1955) - Slim Callaghan
- More Whiskey for Callaghan (1955) - Slim Callaghan
- Jumping for Joy (1956) - Vincent
- Jacqueline (1956) - Jack McBride
- Tiger in the Smoke (1956) - Jack Havoc
- Et par ici la sortie (1957) - Slim Maden / Carlos
- Seven Thunders (1957) - Jim
- The Spaniard's Curse (1958) - Charlie Manton
- Flowers for the Queen (1958) (TV play)
- Broth of a Boy (1959) - Tony Randall
- In the Wake of a Stranger (1959) - Tom Cassidy
- The Rough and the Smooth (1959) - Jack
- And the Same to You (1960) - Percy 'Perce' Gibbons
- The House in Marsh Road (1960) - David Linton
- Faces in the Dark (1960) - Clem
- Attempt to Kill (1961) - Gerry Hamilton
- Callaghan remet ça (1961) - Slim Callaghan
- Journey Into Nowhere (1962) - Ricky
- The Liquidator (1965) - Flying Control
- The Man Who Haunted Himself (1970) - Man in Club (uncredited)
- The Magnificent Six and 1/2 (1971)
- Clinic Exclusive (1971) - Police Inspector
- All Coppers Are... (1972) - Police Inspector
- The Creeping Flesh (1973) - Sailor
- The Hostages (1975)
- Can I Come Too? (1979) - George Skinner

== Theatre ==
- The Woman on the Stair (1959)
- Make Me a Widow (1964)
- The Sacred Flame (1966)
