= Willy Rozier =

French actor, film director, film producer and screenwriter

- Born: William Xavier Rozier; 27 June 1901; Talence (Gironde)
- Died: 29 May 1983 (aged 81); Neuilly-sur-Seine
- Years active: 1931–1976

Willy Rozier (27 June 1901 – 29 May 1983) was a French actor, film director, film producer and screenwriter who also used the pseudonym Xavier Vallier.

He wrote and directed a series of films starring Tony Wright as the detective Slim Callaghan.

== Filmography ==
=== Director ===
- Les Monts en flammes (1931)
- Calais-Dover (1931)
- Le Petit Écart (1931)
- The Night at the Hotel (1931)
- Avec l'assurance (1932)
- Trois cent à l'heure (1934)
- Pluie d'or (1935)
- Maria of the Night (1936)
- Veinte mil duros (1936)
- Men of Prey (1937)
- The Dark Angels (1937)
- Champions of France (1938)
- Hopes (1941)
- Melody for You (1942)
- L'Auberge de l'abîme (1943)
- Solita de Cordoue (1946)
- Les Trafiquants de la mer (1947)
- Monsieur Chasse (1947)
- 56 Rue Pigalle (1949)
- The Wreck (1949)
- The Convict (1951)
- The Damned Lovers (1952)
- Manina, the Girl in the Bikini (1952)
- The Adventurer of Chad (1953)
- Your Turn, Callaghan (1955)
- More Whiskey for Callaghan (1955)
- Et par ici la sortie (1957)
- Un homme se penche sur son passé (1958)
- Callaghan remet ça (1960)
- Prisonniers de la brousse (1960)
- Le Roi des montagnes (1964)
- Les Chiens dans la nuit (1965)
- Les Têtes brûlées (1969)
- Dany la ravageuse (1972)
- Dora, la frénésie du plaisir (1976)
- yacout 1934

=== Actor ===
- La venenosa (1928)
- About an Inquest (1931)
- Calais-Dover (1931)
- Les Monts en flammes (1931)
- Le Petit écart (1932)
- Haut comme trois pommes (short film, 1932)
- The Night at the Hotel (1932)
- Avec l'assurance (1932)
- Court Waltzes (1933)
- The Adventurer of Chad (1953)

== Theatre ==
- 1933 : Cette nuit-là... by Lajos Zilahy, directed by Lucien Rozenberg, Théâtre de la Madeleine
