= Derrick De Marney =

British actor (1906–1978)

- Born: Derrick Raoul Edouard Alfred Marney; 21 September 1906; Brentford, Middlesex, England
- Died: 18 February 1978 (aged 71); Frimley, Surrey, England
- Occupations: Stage and film actor, producer
- Years active: 1922–1966
- Relatives: Terence De Marney (brother)

Derrick Raoul Edouard Alfred De Marney (21 September 1906 – 18 February 1978) was an English stage and film actor and producer, of French and Irish ancestry.

== Actor ==
The son of Violet Eileen Concanen and Arthur De Marney, and the grandson of noted Victorian lithographer Alfred Concanen, he appeared on the London stage from 1922 and films from 1928. It was his performance in the lead role of the play Young Mr Disraeli at the Kingsway and Piccadilly theatres that brought him the offer of a long-term film contract from Alexander Korda. He is perhaps best remembered for his starring role as Robert Tisdall, falsely accused of murder in Alfred Hitchcock's Young and Innocent (1937). Other early film roles include Benjamin Disraeli, this time in Victoria the Great (1937) and its sequel, Sixty Glorious Years (1938).

After Young and Innocent, he alternated between leading roles and supporting parts in films. He was cast in the title role of Uncle Silas (1947), a character part in which he played a man formerly suspected of murder who plots against his young niece, an heiress played by Jean Simmons. After a couple more leads in self-produced films, he tended to concentrate on the theatre, taking only small roles in films and television shows. His last role was in the horror film The Projected Man (1966).

Although he had a home in Kensington in London, De Marney was taken ill while staying with friends at Farnham in Surrey. He died of bronchopneumonia and asthma at the nearby Frimley Park Hospital on 18 February 1978. He was buried in the family plot at West Norwood Cemetery in South London.

== Producer and director ==
With his brother, the actor Terence De Marney, he formed Concanen Productions and produced a number of wartime documentaries on the Polish Air Force, including The White Eagle and Diary of a Polish Airman (both 1942), as well as Leslie Howard's film The Gentle Sex (1943). He also produced and starred in the thrillers Latin Quarter (1945), She Shall Have Murder (1950), and Meet Mr. Callaghan (1954), a role he had created on stage. He also produced and wrote No Way Back (1949), which starred his brother Terence.

He directed the documentary shorts Malta G.C. and London Scrapbook in 1942.

== Partial filmography ==
As actor, unless otherwise noted.

- Two Little Drummer Boys (1928) - Jack Carsdale
- The Valley of Ghosts (1928) - Arthur Wilmot
- The Forger (1928) - Basil Hale
- Adventurous Youth (1928) - The Englishman
- Stranglehold (1931) - Phillip
- Shadows (1931) - Peter
- Money for Nothing (1932) - Minor Role (uncredited)
- The Laughter of Fools (1933) - Captain Vidal
- Music Hall (1934) - Jim
- The Scarlet Pimpernel (1934) - Member of the League (uncredited)
- Immortal Gentleman (1935) - James Carter / Tybalt
- Windfall (1935) - Tom Spooner
- Once in a New Moon (1935) - Hon. Bryan-Grant
- Things to Come (1936) - Richard Gordon
- Cafe Mascot (1936) - Jerry Wilson
- Land Without Music (1936) - Rudolpho Strozzi
- Conquest of the Air (1936) - Minor Role (uncredited)
- The Pearls of the Crown (1937) - Darnley (uncredited)
- Victoria the Great (1937) - Younger Disraeli
- Young and Innocent (1937) - Robert Tisdall
- Blond Cheat (1938) - Michael Ashburn
- Sixty Glorious Years (1938) - Benjamin Disraeli
- Flying Fifty-Five (1939) - Bill Urquhart
- The Lion Has Wings (1939) - Bill - Navigator
- The Second Mr. Bush (1940) - Tony
- The Spider (1940) - Gilbert Silver
- Three Silent Men (1940) - Captain John Mellish
- Dangerous Moonlight (1941) - Mike Carroll
- The First of the Few (1942) - Squadron Leader Jefferson
- London Scrapbook (1942, director)
- The Gentle Sex (1943, producer)
- Latin Quarter (1945, also producer) - Charles Garrie
- Uncle Silas (1947) - Uncle Silas
- Sleeping Car to Trieste (1948) - George Grant
- No Way Back (1949, producer and screenwriter)
- She Shall Have Murder (1950, also producer) - Dagobert Brown
- Meet Mr. Callaghan (1954, also producer) - Slim Callaghan
- Private's Progress (1956) - Pat
- The March Hare (1956) - Capt. Marlow
- Doomsday at Eleven (1963) - Judge Alderbrook
- The Projected Man (1966) - Latham (final film role)
