= Your Turn, Darling =

- Directed by: Bernard Borderie
- Written by: Marc-Gilbert Sauvajon Screenplay; Bernard Borderie Screenplay
- Based on: Your Deal, My Lovely by Peter Cheyney
- Produced by: Henri Jaquillard
- Starring: Eddie Constantine; Gaia Germani; Guy Delorme
- Cinematography: Henri Persin
- Edited by: Christian Gaudin
- Music by: Paul Misraki
- Production company: Borderie/Euro International
- Distributed by: Pathé Consortium Cinéma (France); Euro International Film (Italy); Constantin Film (W.Germany)
- Release date: 25 September 1963
- Running time: 93 minutes
- Countries: France; Italy
- Language: French

À toi de faire... mignonne (Italian: L'agente federale Lemmy Caution), released in the US as Your Turn, Darling, is a French-Italian action comedy films based on the 1941 novel Your Deal, My Lovely by Peter Cheyney. It came out ten years after La môme vert-de-gris which had been the first of film of this series.

It was shot at the Billancourt Studios in Paris and on location around the city. The film's sets were designed by the art director René Moulaert.

For the last time Bernard Borderie directed the popular actor Eddie Constantine in a Lemmy Caution adventure.

Guy Delorme, who in 1961 had been the Comte de Rochefort in Borderie's classic film version of The Three Musketeers, acts another time as a scheming bad guy.

== Synopsis ==
Dr. Whitaker has disappeared after working hard on an innovation which could give either the West or the East an edge in the Cold War. Lemmy Caution, although currently otherwise busy, is assigned to return the scientist.

He is advised to start searching for him by finding in the first place Dr. Whitaker's fiancée Geraldine. Caution finds the scientist, beats up the villains while outnumbered, puts everything right and ends up with the female "love interest."

== Cast ==
- Eddie Constantine as Lemmy Caution
- Gaia Germani as Geraldine
- Guy Delorme as Dr. Whitaker
- Christiane Minazzoli as Carlotta
- Philippe Lemaire as Pranzetti
- Noël Roquevert as Walker, Caution's superior
- Elga Andersen as Montana
- Henri Cogan as Pierrot
- Hubert Deschamps as Henri Grant
- Robert Berri as Kriss
- Colin Drakeas Colonel Willis

== Reception ==
David Deal judges in "The Eurospy Guide" the film was "not an outright spoof", yet he objects director Bernard Borderie sporting slapstick moments ("silly") during the final showdown in a dairy.

== Bibliography ==
- Blake, Matt; Deal, David (2004). The Eurospy Guide. Baltimore: Luminary Press. ISBN 1-887664-52-1.
