= Guy Henri =

French actor (1922–2002)

Guy Henri (also spelled Guy-Henry or Guy Henry, 6 January 1922 – 9 July 2002) was a French actor, notable for roles in films including the uncredited appearance in Légère et court vêtue. He was active from 1940 to 1970.

== Selected filmography ==
- La Comédie du bonheur (1940) - (uncredited)
- Histoire de rire (1941)
- Miss Bonaparte (1942) - (uncredited)
- À vos ordres, Madame (1942) - Minor rôle (uncredited)
- Pontcarral (1942)
- Les Visiteurs du Soir (1942) - (uncredited)
- Haut le vent (1942) - (uncredited)
- Le comte de Monte Cristo, 1ère époque: Edmond Dantès (1943)
- Captain Fracasse (1943) - (uncredited)
- Le Bossu (1944) - (uncredited)
- The Captain (1946)
- Fantômas (1947) - (uncredited)
- Secret Cargo (1947) - (uncredited)
- L'idole (1948)
- Monelle (1948) - Un spectateur au concert (uncredited)
- To the Eyes of Memory (1948) - (uncredited)
- The Secret of Mayerling (1949)
- Le grand cirque (1949) - Rogers (uncredited)
- Just Me (1950) - Un invité chez les Peuchat (uncredited)
- Atoll K (1950) - (uncredited)
- Ils étaient cinq (1951) - (uncredited)
- Paris Still Sings (1951) - (uncredited)
- The Green Glove (1952) - (uncredited)
- Fanfan la Tulipe (1952) - (uncredited)
- Monsieur Leguignon, Signalman (1952) - L'automobiliste accidenté (uncredited)
- Love Is Not a Sin (1952) - Un déménageur
- Judgement of God (1952)
- Drôle de noce (1952)
- Beauties of the Night (1952) - Un homme préhistorique (uncredited)
- La môme vert-de-gris (1953) - Skendt - l'électricien
- Légère et court vêtue (1953) - Un infirmier de l'asile (uncredited)
- Sidi-Bel-Abbès (1954)
- The Women Couldn't Care Less (1954) - Daredo, Paulette's Friend
- Cadet Rousselle (1954) - Atlas - le colosse de la troupe / Un voleur
- Les Chiffonniers d'Emmaüs (1955) - Tonio
- Caroline and the Rebels (1955)
- Napoléon (1955) - Le maréchal Brune (uncredited)
- À toi de jouer... Callaghan!!! (1955) - (uncredited)
- Men in White (1955)
- Chiens perdus sans collier (1955) - Un inspecteur
- Les aristocrates (1955) - Le boucher
- Gas-Oil (1955) - Jojo, un routier
- If Paris Were Told to Us (1956) - Samson (uncredited)
- Naughty Girl (1956) - Tough guy
- Law of the Streets (1956)
- Ces sacrées vacances (1956)
- Fernand cow-boy (1956)
- The Lebanese Mission (1956) - Le géant
- And God Created Woman (1956) - Un bagarreur (uncredited)
- Women's Club (1956)
- The Man in the Raincoat (1957)
- No Sun in Venice (1957)
- Marchands de filles (1957) - Un inspecteur (uncredited)
- Dishonorable Discharge (1957) - Le mécanicien de l'Alizée
- Elevator to the Gallows (1958) - Un inspecteur (uncredited)
- Incognito (1958) - Un policier (uncredited)
- Be Beautiful But Shut Up (1958) - Un inspecteur (uncredited)
- The Mask of the Gorilla (1958) - Un inspecteur (uncredited)
- A Bullet in the Gun Barrel (1958) - Un inspecteur de la P.J. (uncredited)
- The Tiger Attacks (1959) - Un joueur / Un inspecteur (uncredited)
- Asphalte (1959) - L'inspecteur (uncredited)
- Minute papillon (1959)
- Maigret et l'affaire Saint-Fiacre (1959) - Un inspecteur (uncredited)
- 125 rue Montmartre (1959) - (uncredited)
- Les Liaisons dangereuses (1959) - Un inspecteur (uncredited)
- Classe Tous Risques (1960) - (uncredited)
- Colère froide (1960)
- Chaque minute compte (1960)
- Women Are Like That (1960) - Un agent au cabaret (uncredited)
- It Happened All Night (1960) - Deliveryman (uncredited)
- Love and the Frenchwoman (1960) - (segment "Adultère, L'")
- Tintin and the Golden Fleece (1961) - Karabine henchman #1 (uncredited)
- Le bateau d'Émile (1962)
- Arsène Lupin Versus Arsène Lupin (1962) - Minor rôle (uncredited)
- The Gentleman from Epsom (1962) - Un joueur (uncredited)
- The Mysteries of Paris (1962) - (uncredited)
- The Eye of the Monocle (1962) - (uncredited)
- Don't Tempt the Devil (1963) - Un inspecteur (uncredited)
- Carom Shots (1963) - (uncredited)
- D'où viens-tu Johnny? (1963) - Le second policier à l'aérogare (uncredited)
- Le bon roi Dagobert (1963) - Un garde de Charibert
- The Monocle Laughs (1964) - (uncredited)
- Cyrano and d'Artagnan (1964) - Athos (uncredited)
- Le Majordome (1965) - (uncredited)
- Man from Cocody (1965)
- La Métamorphose des cloportes (1965) - (uncredited)
- L'or du duc (1965)
- The Wise Guys (1965)
- Ne nous fâchons pas (1966) - Marcel (uncredited)
- Very Happy Alexander (1968) - Un ami (uncredited)
- Leontine (1968) - Minor rôle (uncredited)
- Le Cercle Rouge (1970) - Un garde (uncredited) (final film role)
