= Your Deal, My Lovely =

1941 novel by Peter Cheyney

- First edition
- Author: Peter Cheyney
- Language: English
- Series: Lemmy Caution
- Genre: Thriller
- Publisher: William Collins, Sons
- Publication date: 1941
- Publication place: United Kingdom
- Media type: Print
- Preceded by: You'd Be Surprised
- Followed by: Never a Dull Moment

Your Deal, My Lovely is a 1941 thriller novel by the British writer Peter Cheyney. It is the seventh in his series of novels featuring the FBI agent Lemmy Caution. Much of the action takes place in wartime London. Caution is called in to investigate the disappearance of a prominent scientist.

== Film adaptation ==
It was made into a 1963 French film Your Turn, Darling directed by Bernard Borderie and starring Eddie Constantine, Gaia Germani and Guy Delorme. It was part of a group of French adaptations of Cheyney novels, whose works were very popular in the country.

== Bibliography ==
- Goble, Alan. The Complete Index to Literary Sources in Film. Walter de Gruyter, 1999.
- Hutton, Margaret-Anne. French Crime Fiction, 1945–2005: Investigating World War II. Routledge, 2016.
- James, Russell. Great British Fictional Detectives. Remember When, 21 Apr 2009.
- Reilly, John M. Twentieth Century Crime & Mystery Writers. Springer, 2015.
- Pitts, Michael R. Famous Movie Detectives. Scarecrow Press, 1979.
