= I'll Say She Does =

1945 novel

- First edition
- Author: Peter Cheyney
- Language: English
- Series: Lemmy Caution
- Genre: Thriller
- Publisher: William Collins, Sons
- Publication date: 1945
- Publication place: United Kingdom
- Media type: Print
- Preceded by: You Can Always Duck
- Followed by: G-Man at the Yard

I'll Say She Does is a 1945 thriller novel by the British writer Peter Cheyney. It is the tenth in his series of novels featuring the FBI agent Lemmy Caution. Later editions of the book are generally titled I'll Say She Does!

== Synopsis ==
In the wake of the Second World War, Caution is in Paris on the trail of some missing State Department files. His hunt soon takes him to Britain.

== Adaptation ==
In 1960 it was made into the French film Women Are Like That directed by Bernard Borderie and starring Eddie Constantine, Françoise Brion and Alfred Adam.

== Bibliography ==
- Goble, Alan. The Complete Index to Literary Sources in Film. Walter de Gruyter, 1999.
- James, Russell. Great British Fictional Detectives. Remember When, 21 Apr 2009.
- Reilly, John M. Twentieth Century Crime & Mystery Writers. Springer, 2015.
- Panek, LeRoy. The Special Branch: The British Spy Novel, 1890-1980. Popular Press, 1981.
- Pitts, Michael R. Famous Movie Detectives. Scarecrow Press, 1979.
