= Atoll K =

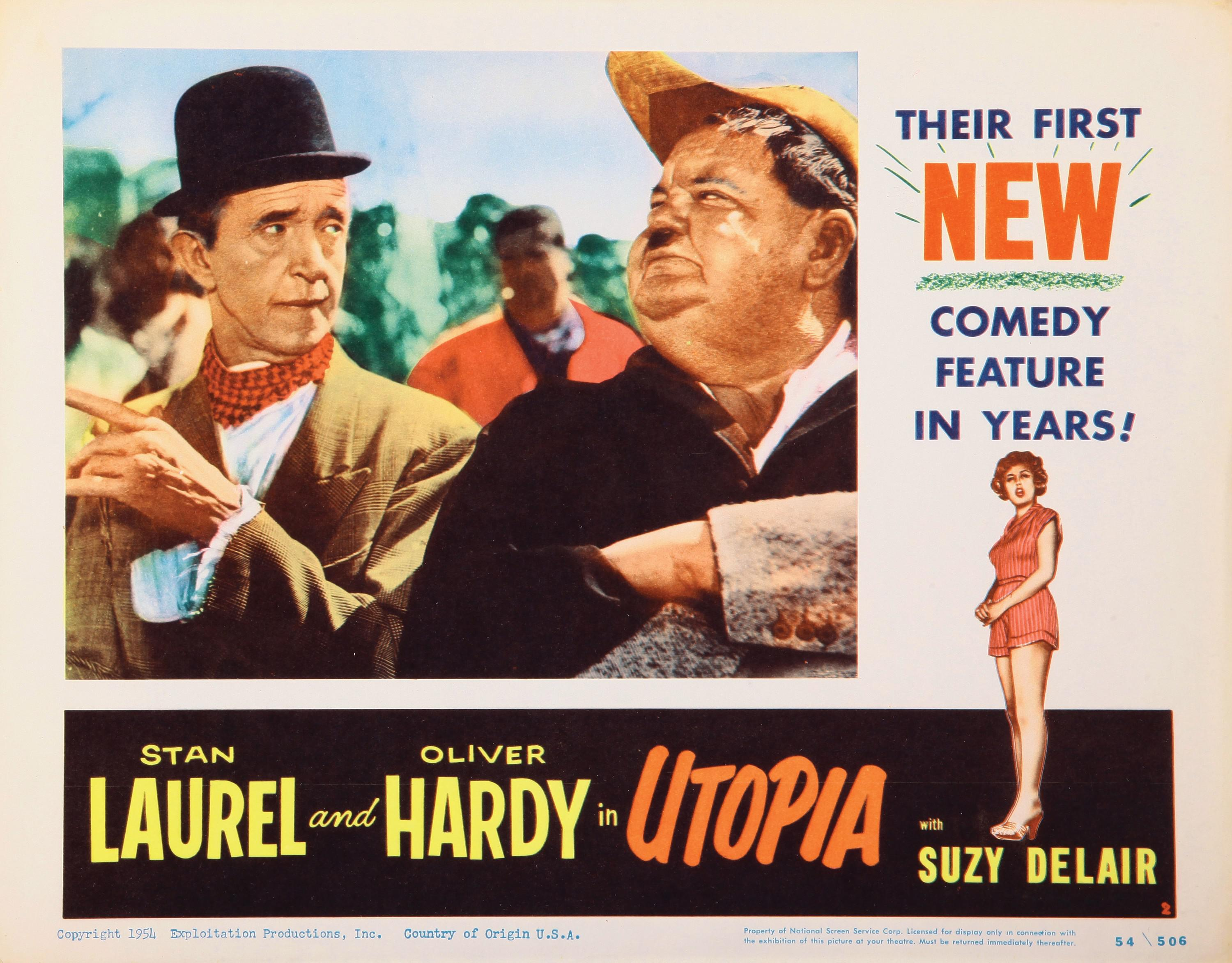
- Poster for American release version
- Directed by: Léo Joannon; John Berry (uncredited)
- Written by: John D. Klorer; Frederick Kohner; Piero Tellini; René Wheeler
- Produced by: Raymond Eger
- Starring: Stan Laurel; Oliver Hardy; Suzy Delair
- Cinematography: Armand Thirard
- Edited by: Raymond Isnardon
- Music by: Paul Misraki
- Distributed by: Franco London Films (France)
- Release dates: 17 October 1951 (France); 25 October 1951 (Italy)
- Running time: 100 minutes: 82 minutes (UK cut)
- Countries: France; Italy
- Languages: French; Italian; English

Utopia (1954) by John Berry and Léo Joannon, American version

Atoll K is a 1951 Franco-Italian co-production film—also known as Robinson Crusoeland in the United Kingdom and Utopia in the United States – which stars the comedy team Laurel and Hardy in their final screen appearance. The film co-stars French singer/actress Suzy Delair and was directed by Léo Joannon, with uncredited co-direction by blacklisted American director John Berry.

== Plot ==
Stan claims an inheritance left by his affluent uncle, significantly diminished by taxes and legal fees, leaving him cash-poor but with a dilapidated yacht and a private island in the South Seas. Stan and Ollie sail for the island alongside Antoine, a stateless refugee, and Giovanni Copini, an Italian stone mason hiding aboard the boat.

During the voyage, the engine fails. Ollie's attempts to repair it prove futile, due to Stan's inadvertent mishandling of the components. Forced to use the sail, the crew contends with a storm at sea, which strands the boat on an uncharted island. The four sailors cultivate the land and settle into a comfortable lifestyle.

An indefinite time passes, and nightclub singer Chérie Lamour is fleeing her possessive fiancé, navy lieutenant Jack Frazer. A sympathetic sailor offers to escort her ashore, but his suspicious wife casts her adrift at gunpoint, and Cherie heads for land—Laurel & Hardy's island. The four men are enchanted by Cherie, and she becomes their guest.

Stan and Ollie, still smarting from their heavy taxation, decide to establish their own government so that no other country can claim the island. Inspired by Robinson Crusoe, they call their island Crusoeland, and declare no laws, taxes, and immigration restrictions.

News of the new, wide-open country attracts hordes of people. The discovery of uranium results in global interest, culminating in a tumultuous revolt to displace the island's founders. The four male castaways are about to be hanged when another violent storm erupts, causing the new arrivals to flee the island.

Antoine goes back to France as a stateless person, but he gets eaten by a lion after trying to escape by hiding in its cage. Giovanni returns to Italy, where he builds fences. Cherie and Lt. Frazer finally get married in a quarrelsome ceremony. This leaves Stan and Ollie alone at last, enjoying the peace and quiet—until a government official and his crew confiscate our heroes' goods and provisions, citing non-payment of taxes. Oliver then tells Stan "Well, Here's Another Nice Mess You've Gotten Me Into!" and Stan whimpers in response.

== Cast ==
- Stan Laurel as Stan
- Oliver Hardy as Ollie
- Suzy Delair as Chérie Lamour
- Max Elloy as Antoine
  - English-dubbed voice by Paul Frees
- Suzet Maïs as Mrs. Dolan
- Adriano Rimoldi as Giovanni Copini
- Luigi Tosi as Lt. Jack Frazer
- Michael Dalmatoff as Alecto
- Claude May as Miss Pringle
- André Randall as Phineas Bramwell
- Robert Vattier as Yves Bonnefoy
- Vittorio Caprioli as Pietro Poltroni
- Lucien Callamand as Harbor official
- Olivier Hussenot as Monsieur Bonnet
- Guglielmo Barnabò as Giovanni's employer
- Philippe Richard as Manager of the Cacatoes Club
- Félix Oudart as Mayor and Registrar of Papeete
- Titys as Deputy to the Mayor
- Palmyre Levasseur as Wife of the Registrar
- Robert Murzeau as Captain Mike Dolan
- Henri Cote as Surveyor
- Charles Lemontier as Senior official
- Maurice Pierrat as French radio announcer
- Hans Verner as German radio announcer
- Jean Maxime as Sailor in the Café Crusoe
- Nicolas Amato as Rub-Out Raymond
- Guy Henri as Alecto's henchman
- Joé Davray as Alecto's henchman
- Roger Legris as Higgins
- Hubert Deschamps as Policeman on the island

== Production ==
In the late 1940s, Laurel and Hardy were without film employment. Earlier in the decade, they ended their long association with producer Hal Roach and signed to make a series of films at both 20th Century Fox and Metro-Goldwyn-Mayer. In post-World War II Europe, Laurel and Hardy were enjoying a new popularity with audiences that had been unable to see their movies during wartime. As a result of this, the pair received an offer from a French-Italian cinematic consortium to star in a film to be produced in France for $1.5 million, a large budget for the era.

The production of Atoll K was plagued with many problems that caused the making of the film to run nine months beyond its projected schedule of twelve weeks. Ida Laurel, Stan Laurel's widow, told biographer John McCabe, "I'm hardly likely to forget the date we left for France and the date we returned – April 1, 1950, and April 1, 1951. But there was no April Fooling about that terrible year. That bloody picture was supposed to take twelve weeks to make, and it took twelve months."

From the beginning, there were disagreements on the film's screenplay. Laurel was unhappy with the heavily political storyline envisioned by French director Léo Joannon and insisted on bringing Alfred Goulding and Monty Collins to aid in writing the screenplay (Alf Goulding received no screen credit and Monty Collins was credited with "gags"). There were also considerable communication problems, since neither Laurel nor Hardy spoke any French and director Joannon spoke very little English.

During the production, the two comedy stars were battling serious health issues. Laurel's pre-existing diabetes was aggravated, and he developed colitis, dysentery and a prostate ulcer while on the French locations for the film. He eventually required hospitalization, and his widow would later fault the quality of the French medical care, claiming that at one point, she had to substitute for an absent nurse by changing her husband's bandages. Laurel's weight dropped to 114 pounds, and for most of the production he was able to work for only 20 to 30 minutes at a time.

While in France, Hardy saw his already hefty frame expand to 330 pounds and he required medical care for an irregular heartbeat and a severe case of the flu. Adding to the medical problems was Italian actor Adriano Rimoldi, who played the stowaway, when he fell from a docked yacht and required a month to recuperate away from the production.

When they were able to work, Laurel and Hardy saw their relationship with Joannon deteriorate rapidly. Ida Laurel would later claim Joannon was an incompetent director who spent three days filming a lake because, as she said, "it was the most photogenic lake he'd ever seen." In the middle of the production, American film director John Berry was quietly brought in to work with the team. Berry's American career had been derailed by the Hollywood blacklist and he sought to start over in France. However, his participation was kept secret out of the fear that the film would not get a theatrical release in America if it became known that a blacklisted director was at its helm. Berry's contribution was not publicly acknowledged until 1967, when film historian William K. Everson cited the uncredited director's input in his book The Films of Laurel and Hardy. While Berry never publicly acknowledged his work on Atoll K, the film's leading lady Suzy Delair confirmed his participation during an interview with historian Norbert Aping.

== Theatrical release ==
The theatrical release of Atoll K was confusing and erratic. There was never one definitive version of the film but, rather, six different edits available: a 98-minute British version titled Atoll K, viewed only at British premieres in September 1951; a 93-minute French version released in October 1951; an 87-minute German version released in December 1951; a 97-minute Italian version called Atollo K; an 82-minute British version called Robinson Crusoeland, released in the United Kingdom in September 1952; and another 82-minute version (edited differently from Robinson Crusoeland) titled Utopia, which premiered in the United States in December, 1954. In the American and British versions, Laurel and Hardy spoke their dialogue in English, as originally recorded, while the French and Italian actors' voices were dubbed in English. The other international versions were presented with the entire soundtracks in their respective languages (all French, all German, all Italian).

In the countries where the various versions played, critical reaction to the film was only fair to poor. The French newspaper Journal du Dimanche complained: "What in hell lured Laurel and Hardy onto this atoll? Unfortunately, this adventure adds nothing to their fame." Italian critic Paolo Locori, writing for the magazine Hollywood, stated: "Stan and Ollie's presence is not enough to lift the movie from its mediocrity." The British Kinematograph Weekly stated the film was "bogged down in a welter of obvious slapstick." When Utopia ultimately played in Los Angeles in early 1955 as a double feature with Blackboard Jungle, Los Angeles Times critic Philip K. Scheuer wrote, "Some of their misadventures en route are nostalgically amusing, but thereafter the comedy deteriorates as rapidly as their fortunes... It is all too plain that Utopia is destined to be the last of the Laurel and Hardy comedies. For the many happy hours, they have given us, our grateful thanks."

== Copyright status and availability ==
Over the years, the prints of three of the six versions have degraded. No U.S. copyright was filed for Utopia, and the English-dialogue version lapsed into the public domain, resulting in inferior film reprints and video versions. For decades, the only known print of the original 98-minute English-language version was in private hands and this version has never been released on video. However, on January 1, 2012, the French/German TV station ARTE aired a restored 100-minute English version of the film, claiming an international television premiere. The restored copy is based on a copy rediscovered in 2010 in the United States. It was released to DVD by Fun Factory Films on January 3, 2013.

Truncated 85/88-minute prints available in Italy on VHS and DVD are all that remain of the Italian version. The original French Atoll K was released on VHS in 1996. On October 10, 2012, the French version of the film was released by Gaumont à la demande on DVD.

In 2018, a 93-minute Blu-ray version of Atoll K was released in the UK (Region B only). The film has also been televised in the United States (edited to fit a 90-minute time slot and using the Utopia title) by the Movies! network as part of its Saturday morning Laurel and Hardy Show series, first syndicated in 1986.
