= Johanna Wolf (brothel owner) =

Austrian-Hungarian brothel owner

Johanna Wolf (1841-floruit 1889), was an Austrian-Hungarian brothel owner, procurer and madam. She owned and operated a successful high class brothel in Vienna from 1865 onward. She has been the subject of fiction.

Among her clients were Rudolf, Crown Prince of Austria and Wilhelm II, German Emperor. She is known to have acted as a messenger and a spy for Rudolf through her connections. Wolf was involved in the Mayerling Incident. Mizzi Kaspar was among her employees.
