= Carita Järvinen =

Finnish model and actress (1938–2022)

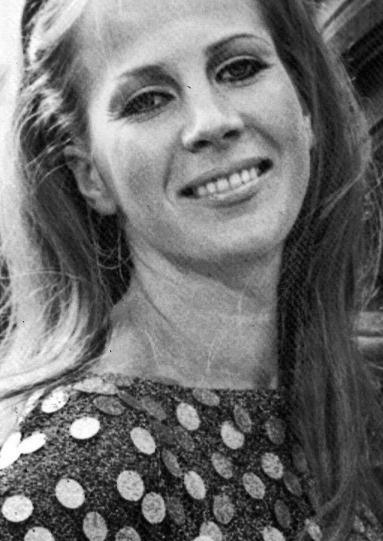
Carita Järvinen in 1966

Carita Linda Järvinen (20 May 1938 – 2022) was a Finnish-born French fashion model and actress who appeared in films mononymously as Carita.

== Biography ==
Järvinen was born in Sipoo on 20 May 1938. She started her modelling career in Finland during the late 1950s. In the 1960s, she moved to Paris. She started modeling for top designers like Coco Chanel, Yves Saint Laurent and Karl Lagerfeld. Järvinen made her film debut in 1962 in a French Lemmy Caution film Lemmy pour les dames.

In 1967, she had a major role in Hammer film The Viking Queen. Järvinen received good reviews on her part as Queen Salina, but never continued her acting career. In 2010, Järvinen said in an interview that, after The Viking Queen, she had rejected two roles in James Bond films.

Järvinen latterly lived in Paris. She also owned a farmhouse in Järvsö, Sweden.
