= Women Are Like That =

Women Are Like That may refer to:

- Women Are Like That (1938 film), an American drama film
- Women Are Like That (1960 film), a French spy thriller film
- Così fan tutte or Women are like that, an opera by Wolfgang Amadeus Mozart
