= Lemmy pour les dames =

- Directed by: Bernard Borderie
- Written by: Marc-Gilbert Sauvajon Screenplay; Bernard Borderie Screenplay; Peter Cheyney; Source material
- Produced by: Raymond Borderie
- Starring: Eddie Constantine
- Cinematography: Armand Thirard
- Edited by: Christian Gaudin
- Music by: Paul Misraki
- Production companies: Compagnie Industrielle Commerciale Cinématographique; Films Borderie
- Release date: 21 March 1962
- Running time: 97
- Country: France
- Language: French

Lemmy pour les dames is a 1962 French eurospy film directed by Bernard Borderie.

== Synopsis ==
Lemmy Caution is on holidays. While he seeks recreation he happens to get entangled in a murder investigation. Soon it is revealed that the female victim had been blackmailed by a foreign secret service. Her husband works for the government and is in possession of national secrets. Her friends are likewise blackmailed and forced into spying on their husbands. Lemmy takes care of this matter.

== Cast ==
- Eddie Constantine as Lemmy Caution
- Françoise Brion as Marie-Christine
- Claudine Coster as Françoise
- Éliane d'Almeida as Sophie
- Yvonne Monlaur as Claudia
- Jacques Berthier as Doctor Nollet
- Robert Berri as Dombie
- Guy Delorme as Mirko
- Lionel Roc as Hugo
- Paul Mercey as Inspector Boumègue
- Jacques Hilling as the hotel keeper
- Carita as Perraque

== Background ==
Henri Cogan was the instructor and choreographer for all fighting scenes.

== Reception ==
"The Eurospy Guide" evaluates the film as "a pleasant diversion" which is fit to make modern audiences understand why Eddie Constantine enjoyed such popularity back then.

== Bibliography ==
- Blake, Matt; Deal, David (2004). The Eurospy Guide. Baltimore: Luminary Press. ISBN 1-887664-52-1.
