= The Women Couldn't Care Less =

- Directed by: Bernard Borderie
- Written by: Jacques Vilfrid; Bernard Borderie
- Based on: Dames Don't Care by Peter Cheyney
- Produced by: Raymond Borderie; Robert Bossis
- Starring: Eddie Constantine
- Cinematography: Jacques Lemare
- Edited by: Jean Feyte
- Music by: Paul Misraki
- Production companies: CICC; Pathé Consortium Cinéma
- Distributed by: Pathé Consortium Cinéma
- Release date: 5 May 1954
- Running time: 109 minutes
- Country: France
- Language: French

The Women Couldn't Care Less or Dames Don't Care (French: Les femmes s'en balancent) is a 1954 French crime film directed by Bernard Borderie and starring Eddie Constantine, Nadia Gray and Dominique Wilms. It features Peter Cheyney's fictional American detective Lemmy Caution.

== Plot ==
Lemmy Caution is assigned to investigate undercover.

== Cast ==
- Eddie Constantine as Lemmy Caution
- Nadia Gray as Henrietta Aymes, Granworth's wife
- Dominique Wilms as Paulette Bénito
- Jacques Castelot as Granworth Aymes
- Robert Burnier as police chief Metts
- Robert Berri as Fernandez / Jean Termiglio
- Darío Moreno as Perera
- Nicolas Vogel as Jim Maloney
- François Perrot as Langdon Nurdell
- Paul Azaïs as guard
- Guy Henri as Daredo
- Pascale Roberts as Casa Antica's Seller
- Georgette Anys as Mrs. Martinguez
- Gil Delamare as Sagers

== Bibliography ==
- Michel Marie. The French New Wave: An Artistic School. John Wiley & Sons, 2008.
