= Lemmy Caution =

Fictional detective

Lemmy Caution is a fictional character created by British writer Peter Cheyney (1896–1951). Caution was first portrayed as a Federal Bureau of Investigation (FBI) agent, and in later stories as a private detective.

== History ==
Cheyney's first book with the character was published in 1936. When This Man Is Dangerous was released, Cheyney was working for the Metropolitan Police as a police reporter and crime investigator, but the novel's success enabled him to become a professional author. Cheyney wrote eleven Lemmy Caution novels between 1936 and 1946. The Lemmy Caution radio series was broadcast in the 1940s in Australia and New Zealand.

Although Caution is an American character created by a British writer, he has yet to appear in an English-language film. However, he has appeared in around 15 European films, most of them French, from 1952 to 1991. In all but the first of these films, he was always played by the same actor, Eddie Constantine, who was indelibly associated with the role for life. The first seven of the Eddie Constantine films, from 1953 to 1963, were straight detective films in the film noir style; later films tended to be experimental or comedic. Today the best-known of these films is the 1965 Jean-Luc Godard film Alphaville, which placed Caution in a dystopian science fiction setting.

Some initial criticism for his creation of an American hero led Cheyney to develop a British-based protagonist Slim Callaghan who appeared in seven bestselling novels from 1938. These led to a similar series of movies.

== Novels ==
- This Man Is Dangerous (1936)
- Dames Don't Care (1937)
- Poison Ivy (1937)
- Can Ladies Kill? (1938)
- Don't Get Me Wrong (1939)
- You'd Be Surprised (1940)
- Your Deal, My Lovely (1941)
- Never a Dull Moment (1942)
- You Can Always Duck (1943)
- I'll Say She Does! (1945)
- G-Man at the Yard (1946)

== Film adaptations ==
After the Second World War, many French people had a strong attachment to American culture and American heroes. Against that background, Cheyney's books were promoted successfully all over France, and consequently the French film industry found them suitable material for a series of popular films.

Lemmy Caution was first played by Dutch actor John van Dreelen in Henri Verneuil's 1952 all-star detective omnibus Brelan d'as (Full House). Bernard Borderie had the chance to produce the first full-length French adaption. He was searching for somebody who had the looks of a gangster, and picked Eddie Constantine, who was already known as a singer. So far he had merely played one supporting role in a film of the very same year, and his lack of experience as an actor was rather obvious, even without comparing La môme vert-de-gris to his later films. However, he came through as an actor. Audiences liked his personality, and that led to a whole series of films with Lemmy Caution.

Lemmy Caution was portrayed as a witty, crafty womanizer who never hesitated to do what he considered right. When playing Lemmy Caution, Eddie Constantine often approached attractive women with a glass of whisky in one hand and a cigarette in the other.

Lemmy Caution and Eddie Constantine were confused in the popular consciousness, and Constantine could never remedy this mix-up.

The film adaptions of Peter Cheyney's book showed Lemmy Caution as a strong and optimistic character who would win even when totally outnumbered, so it came as a shock to many fans when they saw Eddie Constantine's portrayal of Lemmy Caution in Alphaville (1965). In this film he appeared as a tired, elderly, gloomy-looking man, due to Jean-Luc Godard not allowing Constantine to wear make up in harshly lit scenes, with Constantine wearing the kind of trenchcoat associated with Humphrey Bogart and looking as if he was spaced out and lost in a future world.

Lemmy Caution returned later on several times in the 1980s as a cameo in German feature films like Udo Lindenberg's Panic Time.

In 1988 a French TV movie called Le retour de Lemmy Caution appeared, with Lemmy Caution once again as the leading character, but this Lemmy was far away from that of Peter Cheyney.

=== Films ===
- Brelan d'as (1952) English Title: Full House
- La môme vert de gris (1953) English Title: Poison Ivy
- Cet homme est dangereux (1953) English Title: This Man is Dangerous
- Les femmes s'en balancent (1954) English Title: Dames Get Along
- Vous pigez? (1955) English Title: Diamond Machine
- Comment qu'elle est! (1960) English Title: Women Are Like That
- Lemmy pour les dames (1962) English Title: Ladies' Man
- À toi de faire... mignonne (1963) English Title: Your Turn, Darling
- Alphaville, une étrange aventure de Lemmy Caution (1965)
- Le retour de Lemmy Caution (TV movie) (1989)
- Allemagne année 90 neuf zéro (1991)

==== Cameo appearances ====
- Panic Time (1980)
- Kottan ermittelt (1983)
- Tiger: Springtime in Vienna (1984)
- Makaroni Blues (1986)

== See also ==
- Slim Callaghan
