= The Three Musketeers (1961 film) =

- Theatrical poster
- Directed by: Bernard Borderie
- Written by: Bernard Borderie et Jean-Bernard Luc
- Based on: The Three Musketeers; 1844 novel by Alexandre Dumas
- Produced by: Films Borderie; Les Films Modernes; Le Film d'Art; Fono Roma
- Starring: Gérard Barray; Mylène Demongeot; Perrette Pradier; Georges Descrières
- Cinematography: Armand Thirard
- Edited by: Christian Gaudin
- Music by: Paul Misraki
- Distributed by: Pathé Distribution
- Release date: November 4, 1961 (France)
- Running time: 186 minutes
- Countries: France; Italy
- Language: French
- Box office: $33.5 million

The Three Musketeers is a 1961 film adaptation of the 1844 novel by Alexandre Dumas, père. It was released in two parts within the same year.

== Cast ==
- Gérard Barray as d'Artagnan
- Mylène Demongeot as Milady de Winter
- Perrette Pradier as Constance Bonacieux
- Georges Descrières as Athos
- Bernard Woringer as Porthos
- Jacques Toja as Aramis
- Jean Carmet as Planchet
- Guy Delorme as the Count De Rochefort
- Daniel Sorano as Cardinal Richelieu
- Françoise Christoph as ( Queen) Anne of Austria
- Robert Berri as M. Bonacieux
- Henri Nassiet as M. de Tréville
- Guy Tréjan as (King) Louis XIII
- Jacques Berthier as the Duke of Buckingham

== Production ==
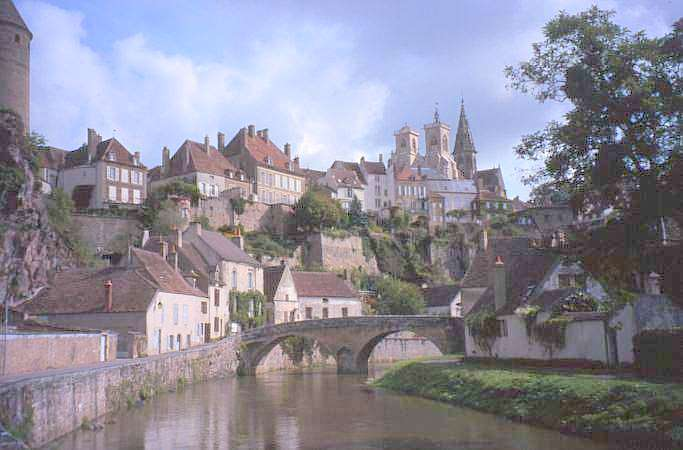
Semur-en-Auxois, one of the locations

Filming locations included Bois de Boulogne, Château de Guermantes in Seine-et-Marne and Semur-en-Auxois (department Côte-d'Or).

== Reception ==
The Three Musketeers was the sixth most watched movie at the French box office in 1961.
