= Panic Time =

- Directed by: Peter Fratzscher
- Written by: Udo Lindenberg; Karlheinz Freynik; Horst Königstein
- Produced by: Udo Lindenberg; Regina Ziegler
- Starring: Udo Lindenberg; Vera Tschechowa; Walter Kohut
- Cinematography: Bernd Heinl
- Edited by: Helga Borsche; Barbara von Weitershausen
- Music by: David A. King; Udo Lindenberg
- Production companies: Amazonas Film; Regina Ziegler Filmproduktion; Roba Music; Tura-Film
- Distributed by: Filmverlag der Autoren
- Release date: 17 April 1980
- Running time: 101 minutes
- Country: West Germany
- Language: German

Panic Time (German: Panische Zeiten) is a 1980 West German comedy film directed by Peter Fratzscher and starring Udo Lindenberg, Vera Tschechowa and Walter Kohut.

The film's sets were designed by the art director Toni Lüdi. Shooting took place in Dortmund, Hamburg and Munich. The film's soundtrack was released on the album Panische Zeiten.

== Plot ==
After a successful concert and during a raucous pool party with plenty of alcohol and loose women, famous singer Udo Lindenberg is kidnapped by a group of political extremists led by the power-hungry Dr. K. They intend to brainwash him to overthrow the German government.

Udo's manager hires Carl Coolman, a laid-back but unsuccessful private investigator, to retrieve the rock star. Aided by Udo's three heavyweight bodyguards Felix, Klaus, and Otto, Coolman sets out to search for traces within Hamburg's subculture, including the Reeperbahn. He receives hints from his friend, secret agent Lemmy Caution.

However, Udo manages to free himself. Using a parachute, he jumps out of a helicopter that is supposed to take him to Norway right into the North Sea. He is washed up on an island where he is saved by the lighthouse keeper's niece. From there, he accidentally spreads his message of peace. Because of a malfunction his critism of the government is broadcast across the radios, TVs, speakers and telephones of the entire country.

This leads to Udo becoming the new Federal Chancellor with a colourful cabinet that includes Peggy Parnass as Federal Minister of Justice, Fritz Rau as Minister of Information, Otto Wanz and Klaus Kauroff as Ministers of Alternative Energy, Helga Feddersen as Minister of Women, as well as several other new ministers from the general public. On camera, Carl Coolman is named by Udo as the new Minister of Anti-Violence.

The film ends with him passing many socio-political reforms aimed to radically eliminate corruption and political injustice and a subsequent rock concert.

== Cast ==
- Udo Lindenberg as Self / Carl Coolman
- Leata Galloway as Vera
- Walter Kohut as Minister Dr. Kurt Kling
- Vera Tschechowa as Mrs. Dr. Wunder
- Felix Scholz as Bodyguard Felix
- Klaus Kauroff as Bodyguard Klaus
- Otto Wanz as Bodyguard Otto
- Hark Bohm as Dr. Gerhard Kühn
- Beate Jensen as Wiebke Stinksterff von Löloland
- Eddie Constantine as Lemmy Caution
- Rudolf Beiswanger as Lighthouse keeper Süchtig
- Peter Ahrweiler as Professor McNaughton
- Fritz Rau as Self
- Heinz Domez as Kidnapper
- Werner Böhm as Kidnapper
- Willi Hermann as Kidnapper
- Renate Schubert as Prostitute Rosa
- Egon Müller as Self
- Jürgen Baumgarten as Motorradfahrer
- Karl Dall as Vögelwart
- Günter Netzer as Günter Netzer's manager

== Bibliography ==
- Hans-Michael Bock and Tim Bergfelder. The Concise Cinegraph: An Encyclopedia of German Cinema. Berghahn Books, 2009.
- Hake, Sabine. German National Cinema. Routledge, 2002.
