= Women Are Like That (1960 film) =

1960 film

- Directed by: Bernard Borderie
- Written by: Marc-Gilbert Sauvajon; Bernard Borderie
- Based on: I'll Say She Does by Peter Cheyney
- Produced by: Charles Borderie; Raymond Borderie
- Starring: Eddie Constantine; Françoise Brion; Alfred Adam
- Narrated by: René Moulaert
- Cinematography: Robert Juillard
- Edited by: Christian Gaudin
- Music by: Paul Misraki
- Production company: Compagnie Industrielle et Commerciale Cinématographique
- Distributed by: S.N. Prodis; Constantin Film (W. Germany)
- Release date: 21 September 1960
- Running time: 91 minutes
- Country: France
- Language: French

Women Are Like That (French: Comment qu'elle est?) is a 1960 French spy thriller film directed by Bernard Borderie and starring Eddie Constantine, Françoise Brion and Alfred Adam. It is based on the 1945 novel I'll Say She Does by the British writer Peter Cheyney featuring hardboiled FBI agent Lemmy Caution. It was part of a series of films featuring Constantine as Caution, inspired by the books by Cheyney who had a large French following.

The film's sets were designed by the art director René Moulaert.

== Synopsis ==
Federal agent Lemmy Caution arrives in France to hunt down a spy known as Varley, but finds himself in a rivalry with the French police who are also chasing the same lead.

== Cast ==
- Eddie Constantine as Lemmy Caution
- Françoise Brion as Martine
- Alfred Adam as Pascal Girotti
- Renaud Mary as Demur
- Robert Berri as Dombie
- Nicolas Vogel as Mayne
- Françoise Prévost as Isabelle
- André Luguet as Le général Rupert
- Fabienne Dali as Danielle
- Jacques Seiler as Le commissaire
- Henri Cogan as Zucco
- Billy Kearns as Charlie Ribban
- Darling Légitimus as Palmyre
- Colin Drake as Général Flash
- Jean Landier as Le barman Vaudois
- Albert Michel as Le brigadier au cabaret
- Georges Demas as Le barman 'Pomme d'amour'
- Marcel Pérès as Le premier agent cycliste
- Émile Genevois as Le second agent cycliste
- Henri Lambert as Le portier 'Chat botté'
- Nicole Dore as La streap-teaseuse
- Charles Marosi as L'expert-comptable

== Bibliography ==
- Goble, Alan. The Complete Index to Literary Sources in Film. Walter de Gruyter, 1999.
- Rège, Philippe. Encyclopedia of French Film Directors, Volume 1. Scarecrow Press, 2009.
