= Mayerling (1968 film) =

French-British romantic historic film

- Theatrical release poster by Tom Jung
- Directed by: Terence Young
- Screenplay by: Terence Young
- Based on: Mayerling by Claude Anet; L'Archiduc by Michel Arnold
- Produced by: Robert Dorfmann; Maurice Jacquin
- Starring: Omar Sharif; Catherine Deneuve; James Mason; Ava Gardner; James Robertson Justice; Geneviève Page; Andréa Parisy; Ivan Desny
- Cinematography: Henri Alekan
- Edited by: Monique Bonnot
- Music by: Francis Lai
- Production companies: Associated British Picture (UK); Winchester-Corona Productions (France)
- Distributed by: Warner-Pathé (UK); Valoria Films (France); Metro-Goldwyn-Mayer (USA)
- Release dates: 1968 (France, UK)
- Running time: 140 minutes
- Country: United Kingdom / France
- Language: English
- Budget: $5 million (estimated)
- Box office: $14.7 million

Mayerling is a 1968 romantic tragedy film starring Omar Sharif, Catherine Deneuve, James Mason, Ava Gardner, Geneviève Page, James Robertson Justice and Andréa Parisy. It was written and directed by Terence Young. The film was made by Les Films Corona and Winchester and distributed by Metro-Goldwyn-Mayer.

It was based on the novels Mayerling by French tennis player and writer Claude Anet and L'Archiduc by Michel Arnold and the 1936 film Mayerling, directed by Anatole Litvak, which dealt with the real-life Mayerling incident.

== Plot ==
In 1880s Vienna, Crown Prince Rudolf of Austria clashes with his father, Emperor Franz Joseph I of Austria and his mother Empress Elisabeth, about the implementation of progressive policies for the empire. Rudolf soon feels he is a man born at the wrong time in a country that does not agree on the need for social reform. The Prince of Wales, later to become King Edward VII of Britain, visits Vienna and provides comic relief. Later in Hungary a popular revolt breaks out, which Rudolf begs his father, Francis Joseph, to tolerate, but to no avail.

Rudolf finds refuge from his loveless marriage with Princess Stéphanie by taking a mistress, Baroness Maria Vetsera. Franz Joseph I sends his son to supervise military training, and exiles Maria to Venice. When back in Vienna, the couple's mutual deaths at Mayerling, the imperial family's hunting lodge, are cloaked in mystery. The film's ending suggests that the two lovers made a suicide pact when they decided they could not live in a world without love or prospects for peace.

== Cast ==
- Omar Sharif as Crown Prince Rudolf
- Catherine Deneuve as Baroness Maria Vetsera
- James Mason as Emperor Franz Josef
- Ava Gardner as Empress Elisabeth
- James Robertson Justice as Prince Edward of Wales
- Geneviève Page as Countess Marie Larisch
- Andréa Parisy as Princess Stéphanie
- Ivan Desny as Count Josef Hoyos
- Fabienne Dali as Mizzi Kaspar
- Véronique Vendell as Lisl Stockau
- Howard Vernon as Prince Alfred of Montenuovo
- Irene von Meyendorff as Countess Stockau
- Mony Dalmes as Baroness Helen Vetsera
- Bernard Lajarrige as Loschek
- Maurice Teynac as Moritz Szeps
- Charles Millot as Count Taafe
- Jacques Berthier as Archduke Jean Salvator
- Roger Pigaut as Count Karolyi
- Lyne Chardonnet as Hannah Vetsera
- Moustache as Bratfisch
- Roger Lumont as Inspector Losch
- Jacqueline Lavielle as Marinka
- Alain Saury as Baltazzi
- Jean-Claude Bercq as Michel de Bragance

== Accuracy ==
Patrick Gibbs in The Daily Telegraph noticed several inaccuracies in the film's story, pointing out that only a small number of people knew of the affair between Rudolf, Crown Prince of Austria and Maria Vetsera, while the film has Rudolf (Omar Sharif) and Maria (Catherine Deneuve) meeting publicly and ostentatiously dancing together at a court ball. Unlike the film, the news of Rudolf's death came as a shock to Franz Josef (James Mason), who assumed his son had been assassinated. He also noted that the action seems to extend over a longer period than the reality (in fact the Prince of Wales's visit happened the preceding year) and that mental illness caused by syphilis may have been a contributing factor in the deaths. (Note: In Gibbs's words, "suicide was a very likely conclusion... Reasons are many and various - he was in debt to the extent of 300,000 florins, he was probably suffering from syphilis, he may even have inherited a touch of madness through his mother whose uncle was Mad King Ludwig of Bavaria. What seems certain is that he didn't die for love, as the film would have us believe...") Margaret Hinxman in The Sunday Telegraph, citing Joan Haslip's biography of Empress Elisabeth of Austria, pointed out how often in the film she (as portrayed by Ava Gardner) is present at significant events "when in fact she was more conspicuous by her absence".

== Production ==
In a promotional interview, Terence Young described seeing the 1930s Charles Boyer-Danielle Darrieux film while reading history at Cambridge and being aware of the historical context: "The original story glossed over a good deal. I suppose the climate of film-making was less permissive then." (Note: Young did not elaborate, but comparing the two films Dilys Powell thought it unlikely "that in the mid-Thirties there would have been the sense of deliberate topical reference afforded by the new film with its scenes of student demonstrations and its background of Hungarian revolt. I doubt, too, whether thirty-odd years ago there would have been quite such suggestions of palace debauchery".)

Shooting took place mainly in Austria, with Viennese locations including the Heldenplatz, the Hofburg, the Schönbrunn Palace and the Spanish Riding School. The scene where the Emperor and Prince Edward (James Robertson Justice) visit the Vienna State Opera for a ballet performance was filmed on a specially constructed set at the Boulogne Studios, Paris; the film-makers also shot briefly in Venice. The Times gave the length of the whole shoot as twelve weeks.

== Reception ==
Derek Malcolm in The Guardian ascribed the film's failure to the central couple: "Omar Sharif as Rudolf goes about things like an exceptionally poor man's Larry Olivier... Catherine Deneuve is asked merely to look winsomely beautiful... They're a damp pair of star-crossed lovers and the final suicide pact seems quite silly." Penelope Mortimer in The Observer struck the same notes: "Omar Sharif and Catherine Deneuve, as the lovers, are extremely tepid; they give no hint whatever of loving each other to distraction."

Michael Billington, reviewing for The Times, found the film uninvolving ("ponderous without being weighty") and the character of Rudolf dislikeable, "an equivocal, oddly unattractive character... grandly announcing that if he has to be patient, so must the students, the poor and the oppressed". He added, however, "As so often, the best performance comes from James Mason who rightly plays the autocratic Emperor from his own point of view: as a preserver of law and order rather than an unenlightened despot".

Patrick Gibbs wrote a lengthy review article for The Daily Telegraph, comparing the film's version of events with the historical record and concluding that the latter was more interesting: "The story as history tells it is so dramatic in its characters and incidents that it seems an extraordinary aberration to dilute it with the clichés of a costume romance".

Margaret Hinxman in The Sunday Telegraph wrote of the film, "Neither dreamily romantic nor historically hard-hitting, it is simply a ponderous pageant of by-gone events." Nonetheless, she singled out for praise Mason and Geneviève Page's performances.

Dilys Powell in The Sunday Times acknowledged the steps the film-makers had taken to make the story more contemporary, but found the finished product unmoving: "There seemed to me to be a lot of dry eyes as we came out".

Howard Thompson in The New York Times was positive about the production values, and Gardner's performance, but called the film "Like an expensive tapestry... beautiful, but flat." Like a later reviewer for Empire, he felt that the film initially promised a political dimension that was then sidelined in favour of romance.

Roger Ebert in The Chicago Sun-Times dismissed the movie: "Attain peace of mind before seeing Mayerling. Compose yourself. This is a very long, slow, passive film... It has magnificent location settings, great scenery and costumes, spellbinding photography and, in short, everything except a story."

Mason's biographer Sheridan Morley calls the film "an only occasionally animated costume parade".

== See also ==
- Mayerling (1936) feature film directed by Anatole Litvak
- Mayerling (1957) TV film also directed by Litvak
