= Destination Fury =

- Directed by: Giorgio Bianchi
- Screenplay by: Italo De Tuddo; Roberto Gianviti; Vittorio Metz; Clarence Weff
- Story by: Sergio Corbucci; Luciano Vincenzoni
- Produced by: Nino Crisman
- Starring: Renato Rascel; Eddie Constantine
- Cinematography: Alfio Contini
- Music by: Piero Piccioni
- Release date: 1961

Destination Fury (Italian: Mani in alto, French: En pleine bagarre) is a 1961 Italian-French criminal comedy film directed by Giorgio Bianchi and starring Renato Rascel and Eddie Constantine.

== Cast ==
- Renato Rascel as Renato Micacci
- Eddie Constantine as Felice Esposito
- Dorian Gray as Pupina Micacci
- Fabienne Dali as Gianna
- Pierre Grasset as Jack
- Raoul Delfosse as Pompon
- Mario Frera as Commissario Treta
- Sylva Koscina
- Robert Dalban
- Magali Noël
