= Don Ziegler =

- Occupation: Actor
- Years active: 1952–1961

Don Ziegler was an American film actor, living in Paris and active in French cinema in the 1950s and early 1960s, usually playing foreigners.

== Selected filmography ==
- Holiday for Henrietta (1952) as the American
- La môme vert-de-gris (1953) as FBI director
- This Man Is Dangerous (1953) as Rolf
- The Babes Make the Law (1955) as the Scotsman
- Paris, Palace Hotel (1956) as a foreign client
- Dishonorable Discharge (1957) as taxi driver
- A Bullet in the Gun Barrel (1958) as the Maltese
- Du rififi chez les femmes (1959) as an extra
- Venetian Honeymoon (1959) as Aristide Sophronides
- Candide ou l'optimisme au XXe siècle (1960) as papa gangster
- Les Héritiers (1960) as Omar Porassis
- Monsieur Robinson Crusoe (1960) as Popeline's father
- Monsieur Suzuki (1960) as inspector Axelrod
- Dans la gueule du loup (1961) as the shipowner Yanakos
