= Nicolas Vogel =

French actor

Nicolas Vogel (born in Paris, France, May 27, 1925 - died in Paris September 17, 2006) was an actor and comedian who was featured in numerous films and television shows in the 1960s and 1970s, including The Man from Chicago (1963), Le Gitan (1975), Mado (1976), and Cop or Hood (1979). Vogel also held a small role in the 1995 film Les Misérables, directed by Claude Lelouch.

== Partial filmography ==
- Patrie (1946)
- Pétrus (1946) - (uncredited)
- Le Bataillon du ciel (1947) - Veran
- Bethsabée (1947) - L'adjudant
- Et dix de der (1948) - John Bradley
- Sous le ciel de Paris (1951) - Un gréviste
- Wolves Hunt at Night (1952) - Jim - le chauffeur de Mollert
- Seuls au monde (1952)
- Le jugement de Dieu (1952)
- La demoiselle et son revenant (1952)
- Desperate Decision (1952) - Tom
- The Respectful Prostitute (1952) - Un client du night-club
- La môme vert-de-gris (1953) - Kerts
- Jeunes mariés (1953) - Un Américain
- The Women Couldn't Care Less (1954) - Jim Maloney
- Sunday Encounter (1958) - Chartier, le dessinateur
- Les liaisons dangereuses (1959) - Jerry Court
- Les Affreux (1959)
- Marche ou crève (1960) - Petit rôle (uncredited)
- Women Are Like That (1960) - Mayne
- Amazons of Rome (1961) - Rasmal
- Callaghan remet ça (1961)
- The Nina B. Affair (1961) - Von Knapp
- Three Faces of Sin (1961) - Un invité au vernissage
- Éducation sentimentale (1962)
- Le Crime ne paie pas (1962) - Joseph Daime (segment "L'affaire Hugues")
- Five Miles to Midnight (1962) - Eric Ostrum
- The Man from Chicago (1963) - The Chief Inspector
- Sweet Skin (1963)
- Brigade antigangs (1966) - Scrisky
- The Night of the Generals (1967) - Plotting German Officer (uncredited)
- I Killed Rasputin (1967) - Dr. Lazovert
- La fille d'en face (1968)
- Faut pas prendre les enfants du bon Dieu pour des canards sauvages (1968) - Le conseiller de Charles (uncredited)
- Le petit matin (1971) - Un capitaine
- César and Rosalie (1972) - Un joueur de poker (uncredited)
- La Scoumoune (1972) - Grégoire
- The Day of the Jackal (1973) - OAS Agent with Denise
- Vincent, François, Paul and the Others (1974) - Clovis
- Rosebud (1975) - Breton Commissioner
- Le gitan (1975) - Jeannot
- Mado (1976) - Maxime
- Cop or Hood (1979) - Marcel Gaston
- Une sale affaire (1981) - Alioti
- Strange Affair (1981) - René
- Waiter! (1983) - Maxime
- Les Misérables (1995) - Le général de Verdun
