= Walter Kohut =

Austrian actor (1927–1980)

- Born: 20 November 1927; Vienna, Austria
- Died: 18 May 1980 (aged 52); Innsbruck, Austria
- Occupation: Actor
- Years active: 1949–1980
- Spouse: Immy Schell

Walter Kohut (20 November 1927 – 18 May 1980) was an Austrian film, television and theatre actor.

He appeared in many Austrian and German films over a 30-year period and became known for playing shady characters. He became known internationally for his portrayal of Field Marshal Walter Model in the 1977 Hollywood blockbuster A Bridge Too Far and for an appearance in the 1979 thriller Bloodline.

He was married to the actress Immy Schell, sister of Maria and Maximilian Schell, his co-star in A Bridge Too Far. He died aged 52 and his gravesite is located in the Mauer cemetery in Vienna.

== Filmography ==
Year	Title	Role	Notes
1949	Vom Mädchen zur Frau		
1958	Hello Taxi	Herbert Gerlinger	
1961	Tales from the Vienna Woods	Alfred	TV film
1965	3. November 1918	Oberleutnant Ludoltz	TV film
1966	Call Girls of Frankfurt	Harry Schimek	
1967	Hot Pavements of Cologne	Poldi	
1967	Midsummer Night	Erik	
1967	Kurzer Prozess	Herr Nagler	
1970	The Delegation	Will Roczinski, Reporter	TV film
1972	Tatort: Münchner Kindl	Franz Ziehsl	TV series episode
1973	The Pedestrian	Dr. Rolf Meineke	
1973	The Sibyl Cipher	Kommissar Putulski	
1974	Supermarket	Theo	
1974	Der Kommissar: Tod eines Landstreichers	Lumm	TV series episode
1974	Only the Wind Knows the Answer	Heinz Seeberg	
1974	Lobster: Handschellen	Fred Wortmann	TV series episode
1976	21 Hours at Munich	Feldhaus	TV film
1976	Vier gegen die Bank	Hartmut Wredel	TV film
1977	A Bridge Too Far	Field Marshal Walter Model	
1977	Die Kette	Inspector Nat Fletcher	TV film
1978	The Glass Cell	Lasky	
1978	Tatort: Der Feinkosthändler	Walter Wever	TV series episode
1979	Kassbach – Ein Porträt	Karl Kassbach	
1979	Bloodline	Krauss	
1980	The Ungrateful	Josef Gassner	TV film
1980	Panic Time	Minister Dr. Kurt Kling	

== Death ==
During the filming of the film Panische Zeiten on 14 January 1980 he suffered a circulatory collapse, fell into a coma and died a few months later without having regained consciousness. He rests in Vienna on the Mauer cemetery (group 29, row 2, number 7) next to his wife.
