= G-Man at the Yard =

1946 novel

- First edition
- Author: Peter Cheyney
- Language: English
- Series: Lemmy Caution
- Genre: Thriller
- Publisher: Poynings Press
- Publication date: 1946
- Publication place: United Kingdom
- Media type: Print
- Preceded by: I'll Say She Does

G-Man at the Yard is a 1946 thriller novel by the British writer Peter Cheyney. It is the final entry in the popular series of novels featuring the FBI agent Lemmy Caution. It was republished posthumously in 1953 following his death in 1951, now also including three short stories. Unlike many other novels by Cheyney it was never made into a film.

== Synopsis ==
Caution heads to London in pursuit of Esmeralda Vandellin, but finds he needs the assistance of Scotland Yard.

== Bibliography ==
- James, Russell. Great British Fictional Detectives. Remember When, 21 Apr 2009.
- Reilly, John M. Twentieth Century Crime & Mystery Writers. Springer, 2015.
- Pitts, Michael R. Famous Movie Detectives. Scarecrow Press, 1979.
