= Lorna the Exorcist =

1974 film by Jesús Franco

- Film poster under alternative title
- Directed by: Jesús Franco
- Produced by: Robert de Nesle
- Starring: Pamela Stanford; Guy Delorme; Lina Romay; Jacqueline Laurent
- Cinematography: Etienne Rosenfeld
- Edited by: Gérard Kikoine
- Music by: André Benichou; Robert de Nesle
- Production company: Comptoir Français du Film Production
- Distributed by: Comptoir Français du Film Production (Paris); Univers Galaxie (Paris)
- Release date: August 21, 1974 (France)
- Running time: 90 minutes
- Country: France

Lorna the Exorcist (French: Les Possédées du diable) is a 1974 French erotic horror film directed by Jesús Franco.

== Cast ==
- Pamela Stanford as Lorna Green
- Guy Delorme as Patrick Mariel
- Lina Romay as Linda Mariel
- Jacqueline Laurent as Marianne Mariel
- Richard Bigotini as Hotel Porter
- Catherine Lafferière as Mad woman
- Howard Vernon as Maurizius, Lorna's butler
- Jesús Franco as Doctor
- Raymond Hardy as Doctor's assistant

== Development ==
Between 1971 and 1975, Paris became director Jesús Franco's main source of financing his films. This was due to laws governing sexual content becoming more liberal in France which led him to work in the country during this period. During this period his shooting schedule for films became greatly accelerated, with the director being able to complete six films in 1971, eight in 1972, and eleven in 1973.

Among the cast was Pamela Stanford who entered the film industry in 1970. She appeared in a string of both pornographic and semi-pornographic films, including eight films for Franco.

While exact shooting dates of Lorna the Exorcist are unknown. Franco biographer Stephen Thrower said that from details seen in the film magazine short story titles and newspaper headlines, the film was likely shot in April 1974. The film was shot in the Languedoc-region of Southern France, including footage shot at La Grande-Motte tourist resort. Parts of Franco's film Countess Pervèrse (1974) were shot during the production of Lorna the Exorcist, specifically all the scenes featuring Caroline Riviére} and Lina Romay at La Grande-Motte.

== Release ==
Lorna the Exorcist was released in France on August 21, 1974. It was also released in France both theatrically and on home video as Les Possédées du diable (lit. 'The Devil's Possessed'). Thrower described the home video release under the second title from France in the early 1980s as "incredibly battered and brown-hued cinema print"

It was released to theaters in the United States under various English titles including Linda and Lucious Linda and in Turin, Italy as Sexy Diabolic Story.

Kino Lorber released the film on blu-ray under the title Lorna the Exorcist on October 24, 2023. Budd Wilkins of Slant Magazine said the release appeared to be "cobbled together from different 35mm source elements" which led to inconsistency in the releases color saturation and image clarity. This version of the film has 100 minute run time.
