= The Gypsy (film) =

- Directed by: José Giovanni
- Screenplay by: José Giovanni
- Based on: Histoire de fou 1959 novel by José Giovanni
- Produced by: Raymond Danon; Alain Delon
- Starring: Alain Delon; Annie Girardot; Paul Meurisse
- Cinematography: Jean-Jacques Tarbès
- Edited by: Jacqueline Thiédot
- Music by: Claude Bolling; Django Reinhardt
- Distributed by: Fox-Lira
- Release date: 1975
- Running time: 102 minutes
- Countries: France; Italy
- Language: French

The Gypsy (French: Le Gitan, Italian: Lo zingaro) is a 1975 French-Italian crime-drama film written and directed by José Giovanni. It is based on Giovanni's novel Histoire de fou.

It recorded admissions of 1,788,111 in France.

== Plot ==
Hugo Sennart, a French Roma, is wanted by the police for theft. Gypsy has a couple of scores to settle and one more little thing to do before he fades into the shadows.

== Cast ==
- Alain Delon as Hugo Sennart, aka Le Gitan
- Annie Girardot as Ninie
- Paul Meurisse as Yan Kuq
- Marcel Bozzuffi as Blot
- Bernard Giraudeau as Mareuil
- Renato Salvatori as Jo Amila
- Maurice Barrier as Jacques Helman
- Maurice Biraud as Pierrot le Naïf
- Michel Fortin as Marcel
- Jacques Rispal as The Veterinary
- Florence Giorgetti as Ninie's servant
- Nicolas Vogel as Jeannot
