= Never a Dull Moment (novel) =

1942 novel by Peter Cheyney

- First edition
- Author: Peter Cheyney
- Language: English
- Series: Lemmy Caution
- Genre: Thriller
- Publisher: William Collins, Sons
- Publication date: 1942
- Publication place: United Kingdom
- Media type: Print
- Preceded by: Your Deal, My Lovely
- Followed by: You Can Always Duck

Never a Dull Moment is a 1942 thriller novel by the British writer Peter Cheyney. It is the eight in his series of novels featuring the FBI agent Lemmy Caution. Cheyney had become known for his hardboiled style, similar to that of Raymond Chandler.

== Synopsis ==
When an American woman is kidnapped and taken to England, supposedly by two mobsters, Lemmy Caution is hot on their trail. Soon it appears there is more to the kidnapping than at first meets the eye.

== Bibliography ==
- James, Russell. Great British Fictional Detectives. Remember When, 21 Apr 2009.
- Pitts, Michael R. Famous Movie Detectives. Scarecrow Press, 1979.
- Reilly, John M. Twentieth Century Crime & Mystery Writers. Springer, 2015.
- Server, Lee. Encyclopedia of Pulp Fiction Writers. Infobase Publishing, 2014.
