= Peter Ahrweiler =

German actor

Peter Ahrweiler (German: [peːteːrahrveːi̯ler]; 6 January 1915 – 3 September 2004) was a German actor and theater director.

== Biography ==
=== Early life ===
Ahrweiler was born in Krefeld.

=== Career ===
Ahrweiler had always wanted to be a pilot. However, after World War II, he opted to begin his career as a cabaret artist. He took over the management of a small theater called Kleine Komödie, located in Hamburg in 1953. He appeared as an actor in several films, including Der Hauptmann von Köpenick in 1956 with Heinz Rühmann, Drei Birken auf der Heide in 1956, and Panic Time in 1980. He also appeared in a 1996 episode of Adelheid und ihre Mörder.

=== Death ===
Ahrweiler died on 3 September 2004 in Hamburg after a long illness. His resting place is at the Ohlsdorf Cemetery in Hamburg.

== Filmography ==
Year	Title	Role	Notes
1951	The Lost One	Oberstleutnant Marquardt	Uncredited
1956	The Captain from Köpenick	Anstaltsgeistlicher	
1956	Skandal um Dr. Vlimmen	Baron Neervetten	
1956	Drei Birken auf der Heide		
1957	Glücksritter		
1971	Das Freudenhaus		
1971	St. Pauli Nachrichten: Thema Nr. 1	Dr. Vogt	
