= The Three Musketeers (1987 TV series) =

Japanese anime series

- Film poster

アニメ三銃士 (Anime San Jūshi)
- Anime television series
- Directed by: Kunihiko Yuyama
- Written by: Monkey Punch (adaptation)
- Studio: Studio Gallop
- Licensed by: US: RetroCrush
- Original network: NHK General TV
- English network: US: The Monitor Channel
- Original run: 9 October 1987 – 17 February 1989
- Episodes: 52
- Anime film

The Three Musketeers: Aramis the Adventure
- Directed by: Kunihiko Yuyama
- Written by: Monkey Punch (adaptation)
- Studio: Studio Gallop
- Licensed by: US: RetroCrush
- Released: 11 March 1989
- Runtime: 46 minutes

The Three Musketeers (アニメ三銃士, Anime Sanjūshi; lit. The Three Musketeers: The Animation) is a Japanese animated television series based on the d'Artagnan Romances written by Alexandre Dumas, that ran from October 1987 to February 1989. The series was adapted for anime by Monkey Punch.

A feature film sequel, The Three Musketeers: Aramis the Adventure (アニメ三銃士 アラミスの冒険, Anime San Jūshi: Aramisu no Bōken; lit. The Three Musketeers: The Animation: Aramis' Adventure), was released in March 1989.

The TV series and the film are licensed by RetroCrush in the US for streaming, and are available on their website as well as on Prime Video.

== Plot ==
D'Artagnan leaves his hometown in the province of Gascony for Paris, in order to join the King's Musketeers or the Guards of the Cardinal. At his arrival, he gets into an argument with Athos, Porthos and Aramis and provokes them into a sword-fight. While fighting, they are interrupted by the Guards of the Cardinal, who are enforcing the King's decree banning duels. Afterwards, d'Artagnan and the others become friends and adopt the motto "All for one, and one for all".

== Cast ==
- D'Artagnan: Tatsuya Matsuda
- Constance Bonacieux: Noriko Hidaka
- Jean: Mayumi Tanaka
- Athos: Akira Kamiya
- Aramis: Eiko Yamada
- Porthos: Masamichi Satō
- Louis XIII: Hideyuki Tanaka
- Queen Anne: Mari Okamoto
- Richelieu: Nobuo Tanaka
- Tréville: Tesshō Genda
- Rochefort: Shigeru Chiba
- Jacques: Tomomichi Nishimura
- Milady: Fumi Hirano
- Coby: Naoki Tatsuta
- Narration: Toshiko Sawada
