= You'd Be Surprised (novel) =

1940 novel

- 1945 edition
- Author: Peter Cheyney
- Language: English
- Series: Lemmy Caution
- Genre: Thriller
- Publisher: William Collins, Sons
- Publication date: 1940
- Publication place: United Kingdom
- Media type: Print
- Preceded by: Don't Get Me Wrong
- Followed by: Your Deal, My Lovely

You'd Be Surprised is a 1940 thriller novel by the British writer Peter Cheyney. It is the sixth in his series of novels featuring the FBI agent Lemmy Caution. Unlike several of the others it has not been adapted for film.

== Bibliography ==
- James, Russell. Great British Fictional Detectives. Remember When, 21 Apr 2009.
- Pitts, Michael R. Famous Movie Detectives. Scarecrow Press, 1979.
- Reilly, John M. Twentieth Century Crime & Mystery Writers. Springer, 2015.
- Server, Lee. Encyclopedia of Pulp Fiction Writers. Infobase Publishing, 2014.
