= Vier gegen die Bank =

Vier gegen die Bank is the title of two adaptations of the novel The Nixon Recession Caper by Ralph Maloney:

- Vier gegen die Bank (1976 film), a TV movie directed by Wolfgang Petersen
- Vier gegen die Bank (2016 film), a theatrical film remake directed by Wolfgang Petersen
