= Comte de Rochefort =

- d'Artagnan Romances character
- First appearance: The Three Musketeers
- Last appearance: Twenty Years After
- Created by: Alexandre Dumas

In-universe information
- Alias: "Man from Meung"
- Gender: Male
- Title: Cardinal's écurie
- Occupation: Spy; Messenger
- Nationality: French

The Comte de Rochefort is a secondary fictional character in Alexandre Dumas' d'Artagnan Romances. He is described as approximately 40 to 45 years old in 1625 and "fair with a scar across his cheek".

== In The Three Musketeers ==
Known throughout the novel as "The Man from Meung", his first appearance is in the opening chapter of The Three Musketeers (1844). He insults d'Artagnan and steals his letter of recommendation to Monsieur de Tréville, causing d'Artagnan to swear revenge.

He reappears from time to time as the story progresses. D'Artagnan regularly sees Rochefort and tries to catch him, but each time Rochefort skillfully vanishes into the street crowds of Paris. D'Artagnan does not meet him again or learn his name until the end of the novel. It is Rochefort who kidnaps Constance Bonacieux and it is eventually revealed that he is the other main agent, in addition to Milady de Winter, of Cardinal Richelieu. He is sent by Richelieu to escort Milady de Winter in some of her missions. At the end of the novel, Rochefort tries to arrest d'Artagnan for the cardinal; Richelieu eventually orders the men to become friends. In the epilogue, it is revealed that Rochefort and an older and wiser d'Artagnan fought on three occasions, all duels being won by d'Artagnan, settling their differences and becoming friends.

== In Twenty Years After ==
Rochefort reappears in the 1845 sequel, Twenty Years After. He falls out of favor with Richelieu's successor Mazarin and spends five years in the Bastille. When Mazarin dismisses him from service for being too old, he joins the side of the Frondeurs. He aids Athos in freeing the Duke of Beaufort and reappears in the end at the riot against Mazarin's return. Unable to recognize his friend in the chaos, d'Artagnan kills Rochefort, as he had predicted he would if they fought a fourth time.

== In other fiction ==
The Comte de Rochefort was the subject of an earlier novel, Mémoires de M.L.C.D.R. (Memoirs of Monsieur Le Comte de Rochefort) written in 1678 by Gatien de Courtilz de Sandras. Courtilz de Sandras also wrote Mémoires de M. d'Artagnan (1700). Dumas combined the two, replacing an aristocrat named Rosnay from the d'Artagnan story with the Comte de Rochefort.

- A thug nicknamed Rochefort plays the role in the 1993 book The Club Dumas by Arturo Pérez-Reverte.
- Rochefort is the narrator and protagonist of Mary Gentle's 2003 novel 1610: A Sundial in a Grave.
- Rochefort appears in Jason Sæterøy's 2008 graphic novel The Last Musketeer in which he colludes with the Emperor of Mars to invade Earth.
- Rochefort is an important character in The Cardinal's Blades, a historical fantasy trilogy by Pierre Pevel set in the early 17th century.
- Rochefort appears in Tansy Rayner Roberts' science fiction retelling Musketeer Space, renamed Rosnay Cho. She is an agent in the service of the Cardinal, and the love interest of protagonist Dana Dartagnan.
- Rochefort's son appears as a hero in Louis XIV's court in Count Rochefort in the Seven Circles of Satan by Frank Schildiner.

== In film and television ==
In film Rochefort has been played by:

- Boyd Irwin in The Three Musketeers (1921)
- Ullrich Haupt in The Iron Mask (1929)
- Ian Keith in The Three Musketeers (1935) and The Three Musketeers (1948)
- Lionel Atwill in The Three Musketeers (1939)
- William Hanna in The Two Mouseketeers (1952; voice only)
- Guy Delorme in The Three Musketeers (1961)
- Christopher Lee in The Three Musketeers (1973), The Four Musketeers (1974) and The Return of the Musketeers (1989).
- Boris Klyuyev in D'Artagnan and Three Musketeers (1978)
- Dave Mallow in Dogtanian and the Three Muskehounds (1981–1982; voice only)
  - Pierre Trabaud in French dub.
  - Rokurō Naya in Japanese dub.
  - Victor Agramunt in Spanish dub.
  - Humberto Vélez in Latin American dub.
- Shigeru Chiba in アニメ三銃士, Anime Sanjūshi (1987–1989; voice only)
- Michael Wincott in The Three Musketeers (1993)
- David Schofield in The Musketeer (2001)
- Mads Mikkelsen in The Three Musketeers (2011)
- Marc Warren in the BBC TV series The Musketeers (2015), replacing Peter Capaldi's Cardinal Richelieu.

Film incarnations tend to depict Rochefort as a far darker character than in the novel and often extend his role. D'Artagnan kills Rochefort in a duel in The Four Musketeers, though he turns up alive in The Return of the Musketeers, only to die for real in a gunpowder explosion intended for and partially triggered by the musketeers; the character suffers the former fate in the 1993 film. In his three appearances as Rochefort, Christopher Lee wore an eyepatch, intended to make the character look more sinister. The eyepatch, a departure from Rochefort's appearance in Dumas' novel, was deemed striking enough to be retained in several other film adaptations: Wincott, Mikkelsen, and, eventually, Warren retained it in their portrayals as did the anime version. Tim Roth's Febre, the main villain of The Musketeer, also wears an eyepatch, though Rochefort does not.

In the cartoon series Dogtanian and the Three Muskehounds, Rochefort has a scar on his forehead rather than his cheek. Throughout the series, the title character often calls him "Black Moustache".
