= OSS 77 – Operazione fior di loto =

OSS 77 - Operazione fior di loto
- Directed by: Bruno Paolinelli
- Music by: Luis Bacalov
- Release date: 1965
- Country: Italy
- Language: Italian

OSS 77 – Operazione fior di loto (Operation Lotus Flower) is a 1965 Italian Eurospy spy film directed by Bruno Paolinelli.

== Cast ==
- Dominique Boschero
- Gaia Germani
- Sandro Moretti (as Robert Kent)
- Yoko Tani
- Jean-Louis Trista
