= Poison ivy (disambiguation) =

Poison ivy is a common name for Toxicodendron radicans, a poisonous plant, and two other poisonous plant species.

Poison ivy or Poison Ivy may also refer to:

== Plants ==
- Toxicodendron radicans, (eastern poison ivy), a North American shrub or vine
- Toxicodendron rydbergii (western poison ivy), a North American shrub
- Smodingium argutum (African poison ivy), a southern African shrub or tree

== Arts and entertainment ==
=== Film and television ===
- La môme vert-de-gris or Poison Ivy, a 1953 French film by Bernard Borderie, based on Peter Cheyney's novel
- Poison Ivy (film series), an American erotic thriller film series that includes four films 1992–2008
  - Poison Ivy (1992 film), the first in the series
- Poison Ivy (1985 film), an American comedy television film
- "Poison Ivy" (Gossip Girl), a 2007 episode of Gossip Girl
- "Poison Ivy" (Law & Order), a 1990 episode of Law & Order
- Ivy Tilsley or Poison Ivy, a character from Coronation Street

=== Literature ===
- Poison Ivy (character), a character of the DC Universe
  - Poison Ivy: Cast Shadows, a 2004 DC Comics one-shot
  - Poison Ivy: Cycle of Life and Death, a 2016 DC Comics series
  - Poison Ivy: Thorns, a 2021 DC Comics graphic novel
  - Poison Ivy (2022 comic book), a 2022 DC Comics series
- Poison Ivy, a 1937 novel by Peter Cheyney that was adapted as a 1953 French film

=== Music ===
- Poison Ivy (musician) (born 1953), American musician and co-founder of the Cramps
- "Poison Ivy" (song), a 1959 Leiber/Stoller song
- "Poison Ivy", a Mel London song recorded in 1954 by Willie Mabon
- "Poison Ivy", a 1963 The Hollies song from The Hollies - The Essential Collection
- "Poison Ivy", a 1989 Faster Pussycat song from Wake Me When It's Over
- "Poison Ivy", a 2004 Von Bondies song from Pawn Shoppe Heart
- "Poison Ivy", a 2004 Rita Lee song from 3001
- "Poison Ivy", a 2009 Jonas Brothers song from Lines, Vines and Trying Times

== Other uses ==
- Ivy Lee or Poison Ivy (1877–1934), a pioneer in public relations and an employee of John D. Rockefeller's
- PoisonIvy, a type of computer malware

== See also ==
- Ivy (disambiguation)
