= Alphaville (film) =

1965 film by Jean-Luc Godard

- Theatrical release poster
- Directed by: Jean-Luc Godard
- Written by: Jean-Luc Godard
- Produced by: André Michelin
- Starring: Eddie Constantine; Anna Karina; Akim Tamiroff
- Cinematography: Raoul Coutard
- Edited by: Agnès Guillemot
- Music by: Paul Misraki
- Production companies: Chaumiane Productions; Filmstudio
- Distributed by: Athos Films (France); Filmstudio (Italy)
- Release dates: 5 May 1965 (France); 7 August 1965 (Italy)
- Running time: 99 minutes
- Countries: France; Italy
- Language: French

Alphaville (subtitled Une étrange aventure de Lemmy Caution, "A Strange Adventure of Lemmy Caution") is a 1965 French New Wave tech noir film written and directed by Jean-Luc Godard, and starring Eddie Constantine, Anna Karina and Akim Tamiroff. The film combines the genres of dystopian science fiction and film noir. There are no special props or futuristic sets: instead, the film was shot in real locations in Paris, the night-time streets of the capital becoming the streets of Alphaville, while modernist glass and concrete buildings (which in 1965 were new and strange architectural designs) represent the city's interiors. Although the film is set in the future, the technologies used and the corporations and events mentioned in the film place them firmly in the 20th century; for example, Caution describes himself as a Guadalcanal veteran.

Expatriate American actor Eddie Constantine plays Lemmy Caution, a trenchcoat-wearing secret agent. Constantine had already played this or similar roles in dozens of previous films; the character was originally created by British crime novelist Peter Cheyney. However, in Alphaville, director Jean-Luc Godard moves Caution away from his usual twentieth-century setting and places him in a futuristic sci-fi dystopia, the technocratic dictatorship of Alphaville.

The film was released in France on May 5, 1965. It won the Golden Bear award of the 15th Berlin International Film Festival in 1965, and has received critical acclaim since its initial release.

== Plot ==
Lemmy Caution is a secret agent with the code number of 003 from "the Outlands". Entering Alphaville in his Ford Mustang, which he refers to as a Ford Galaxie, he poses as a journalist named Ivan Johnson and claims to work for the Figaro-Pravda newspaper. Caution is on a series of missions. First, he searches for the missing agent Henri Dickson; second, he is to capture or kill the creator of Alphaville, Professor von Braun; lastly, he aims to destroy Alphaville and its dictatorial computer, Alpha 60. (Note: Alpha 60 is portrayed using an actual Bull Gamma 60 computer in the film.) Alpha 60 is a sentient computer system created by von Braun, which is in complete control of all of Alphaville.

Alpha 60 has outlawed free thought and individualist concepts like love, poetry, and emotion in the city, replacing them with contradictory concepts or eliminating them altogether. One of Alpha 60's dictates is that "people should not ask 'why', but only say 'because'". People who show signs of emotion or refuse to adapt are presumed to be acting illogically and are executed by a variety of means: being machine gunned into a swimming pool, where they are stabbed by beautiful women to the applause of "very important people", or by attending the "execution theater", where they are electrocuted in their seats. A Bible, later revealed to instead be a dictionary, in every hotel room is continually updated as words deemed to evoke emotion are banned. As a result, Alphaville is an inhuman, alienated society.

Images of E = mc^{2} and E = hf (the equations of, respectively, special relativity and quantum mechanics) are displayed several times to refer to the scientism that underpins Alphaville. At one point, Caution passes through a place called the Grand Omega Minus, from where brainwashed people are sent out to the other "galaxies" to start strikes, revolutions, family rows, and student revolts. Caution is told that Alphaville plans to invade the "outer countries" and that his knowledge of them could be useful.

As an archetypal American antihero private eye, with a trenchcoat, fedora hat, and weathered visage, Lemmy Caution's old-fashioned machismo conflicts with the puritanical computer. The opposition of his role to logic (and that of other dissidents to the regime) is represented by faux quotations from Capitale de la douleur ("Capital of Pain"), a book of poems by Paul Éluard.

Caution meets Dickson, who starts having sex with a "Seductress Third Class" but then dies while telling Caution to "make Alpha 60 destroy itself" and "save those who weep". Caution then enlists the assistance of Natacha von Braun, a programmer of Alpha 60 and daughter of Professor von Braun. Natacha is a citizen of Alphaville and, when questioned, says that she does not know the meaning of "love" or "conscience". Caution falls in love with her, and his love introduces emotion and unpredictability into the city. Natacha discovers, with the help of Lemmy Caution, that she was actually born outside Alphaville.

Alpha 60 converses with Lemmy Caution several times, and its guttural voice seems to be ever-present in the city. The computer identifies Caution as a spy and sentences him to death, but he escapes, shooting and killing the men guarding him. He finds Professor von Braun, who was originally known as Leonard Nosferatu, but Caution is repeatedly told that Nosferatu no longer exists. The Professor offers Caution the chance to join Alphaville and even to rule a galaxy. When he refuses Caution's offer to go back to "the outlands", Caution kills him and escapes.

Caution finally destroys or incapacitates Alpha 60 by telling it a riddle that involves something that it cannot comprehend: poetry. The concept of the individual self has been lost to the collectivized citizens of Alphaville, and this is the key to Caution's riddle. As the citizens collapse, Caution leaves Alphaville, with Natacha, who eventually achieves an understanding of herself as an individual with desires. He tells her not to look back, and the film ends with her line "Je vous aime" ("I love you").

== Cast ==
- Eddie Constantine as Lemmy Caution
- Anna Karina as Natacha von Braun
- Akim Tamiroff as Henri Dickson
- Howard Vernon as Professor von Braun/Leonard Nosferatu
- Christa Lang as 1st Seductress Third Class
- Valérie Boisgel as 2nd Seductress Third Class
- Jean-Louis Comolli as Professor Jeckell
- Michel Delahaye as Prof. von Braun's assistant
- Jean-André Fieschi as Professor Heckell
- Jean-Pierre Léaud as the breakfast waiter
- László Szabó as the Chief-engineer

Only Constantine, Karina, and Tamiroff are listed in the credits.

== Production ==
Professor von Braun (Howard Vernon) has invented the omniscient computer that rules the lives of the Alphaville citizens...The dominating computer, reducing life to ‘logic’...replaces the individual’s will with a tranquilized submission...In Alphaville, by computer decree, killing is a spectator sport. At a swimming pool, illogical [disobedient] men...are blindfolded and made to stand on diving boards. They are shot and fall into the water, whereupon girls with knives dive into the pool and hack at the bodies. All this is greeted with polite applause from the tranquilized onlookers. The atmosphere is totally unemotional.

— Film historian Gordon Gow, Suspense in the Cinema (1968).

Despite its futuristic scenario, Alphaville was filmed entirely in and around Paris and no special sets or props were constructed. Buildings used were the Electricity Board building for the Alpha 60 computer centre and Le Grand Hotel.

Constantine came to the film through producer André Michelin, who had the actor under contract. Constantine had become a popular actor in France and Germany through his portrayal of tough-guy detective Lemmy Caution in a series of earlier films. Godard appropriated the character for Alphaville but according to director Anne Andreu, Godard's subversion of the Lemmy Caution "stereotype" effectively shattered Constantine's connection with the character—he reportedly said that he was shunned by producers after Alphaville was released. Constantine did not play Lemmy Caution again until Panic Time in 1980.

The opening section of the film includes an unedited sequence that depicts Caution walking into his hotel, checking in, riding an elevator and being taken through various corridors to his room. According to cinematographer Raoul Coutard, he and Godard shot this section as a continuous four-minute take. Part of this sequence shows Caution riding an elevator up to his room, which was achieved thanks to the fact that the hotel used as the location had two glass-walled elevators side by side, allowing the camera operator to ride in one lift while filming Constantine riding the other car through the glass between the two. However, as Coutard recalled, this required multiple takes, since the elevators were old and in practice they proved very difficult to synchronize.

Like most of Godard's films, the performances and dialogue in Alphaville were substantially improvised. Assistant director Charles Bitsch recalled that, even when production commenced, he had no idea what Godard was planning to do. Godard's first act was to ask Bitsch to write a screenplay, saying that producer Michelin had been pestering him for a script because he needed it to help him raise finance from backers in Germany (where Constantine was popular). Bitsch protested that he had never read a Lemmy Caution book, but Godard simply said "Read one and then write it." Bitsch read a Caution book, then wrote a 30-page treatment and brought it to Godard, who said "OK, fine" and took it without even looking at it. It was then given to Michelin, who was pleased with the result, and the "script" was duly translated into German and sent off to the backers. In fact, none of it even reached the screen and according to Bitsch the German backers later asked Michelin to repay the money when they saw the completed film.

== Influences on the film ==
- Caution references Louis-Ferdinand Céline directly in the taxi, when he says "I am on a journey to the end of the night" (Voyage au bout de la nuit, 1932). The use of poetry to combat Alpha 60 as a sentient being echoes the attitudes of Céline in a number of his works.
- Henri Bergson is also referenced by Caution when being interrogated by Alpha 60, when he answers "the immediate data of consciousness " (Essai sur les données immédiates de la conscience, 1889) when asked his religion. Bergson's rejection of idealism in favour of felt experiences parallels Caution's conflict with the logical Alpha 60.
- Caution makes another reference to French poetry when speaking to Alpha 60, saying that when it will solve his riddle it will become "[his] like, [his] brother," echoing the famous last line of Charles Baudelaire's "To the Reader" in Flowers of Evil.
- Jean Cocteau exerted significant influence on Godard's films, and parallels between Alphaville and Cocteau's 1950 film Orpheus are evident. For example, Orphée's search for Cégeste and Caution's for Henri Dickson, between the poems Orphée hears on the radio and the aphoristic questions given by Alpha 60, between Orphée's victory over death through the recovery of his poetic powers and Caution's use of poetry to destroy Alpha 60. Godard also openly acknowledges his debt to Cocteau on several occasions. When Alpha 60 is destroyed, for instance, people stagger down labyrinthine corridors and cling to the walls like the inhabitants of Cocteau's Zone de la mort, and, at the end of the film, Caution tells Natacha not to look back. Godard compares this scene with Orphée's warning to Eurydice, and it is also possible to detect a reference here to the biblical flight from Sodom.
- The voice of Alpha 60 was performed by a man with a mechanical voice box replacing his cancer-damaged larynx. It is inspired by Dr. Mabuse's disembodied voice in the 1933 film The Testament of Dr Mabuse.

== Reception ==
On the review aggregator website Rotten Tomatoes, Alphaville holds an approval rating of 92% based on 50 reviews, with an average rating of 8.3/10. The website's critics consensus reads, "While Alphaville is by no means a conventional sci-fi film, Jean-Luc Godard creates a witty, noir-ish future all his own." Metacritic, which uses a weighted average, assigned the film a score of 92 out of 100, based on 7 critics, indicating "universal acclaim". Time Out London gave the film a positive review, calling it "a dazzling amalgam of film noir and science fiction". Writing for the Boston Globe, Ty Burr would say, "Nothing about this strange, moving work of agit-pop has ever seemed out of date. If anything, "Alphaville" moves closer to relevance with every passing year."

== Legacy ==
- German synth-pop band Alphaville took their name from the film.
- The affluent suburb Alphaville, outside São Paulo, Brazil, is named after the film.
- The cover of Robert Palmer's debut album Sneakin' Sally Through the Alley (1974) was inspired by Alphaville.
- The film production company Alphaville Pictures was co-founded in 2003 by Danish director Christoffer Boe, and was named after the film.
- Haruki Murakami's 2004 novel After Dark features a love hotel named after the film. The book is also set entirely at night and the narrative voice often takes the shape of a camera.
- The music video for the 2005 Kelly Osbourne song "One Word" is an homage to Alphaville. It was filmed in black and white and restages multiple sequences from the film, including many specific shots, and also recreates many of the film's distinctive costumes, sets and locations.
- Jazz bassist and composer William Parker's 2007 album Alphaville Suite is inspired by and named after the film.
- The 1966 Bally pinball game Capersville was influenced by the film. The artist for the game was Jerry Kelley who stated in a May 2000 conversation with pinball collector Christian Jacobs that Kelley's inspiration for the art for Capersville was the film Alphaville. The designer of the game was Ted Zale and it is very likely Kelly collaborated with Zale so the art and game worked together.
- The Cranberries' 1993 Linger music video is based loosely on the film directed by director Melodie McDaniel.

== See also ==
- List of cult films
- List of French-language films
