= The Viking Queen =

1967 British film by Don Chaffey

- UK quad poster by Tom Chantrell
- Directed by: Don Chaffey
- Screenplay by: Clarke Reynolds; John Temple-Smith (story)
- Produced by: John Temple-Smith
- Starring: Don Murray; Carita; Donald Houston; Andrew Keir; Niall MacGinnis; Adrienne Corri
- Cinematography: Stephen Dade
- Edited by: Peter Boita
- Music by: Gary Hughes
- Production company: Hammer Films
- Distributed by: Warner-Pathé Distributors (UK); Twentieth Century Fox Film Corporation (U.S.)
- Release date: 25 March 1967
- Running time: 91 minutes
- Country: United Kingdom
- Language: English
- Budget: £411,000

The Viking Queen is a 1967 Hammer adventure film directed by Don Chaffey and starring Don Murray. It is set in Roman Britain.

The title of the film caused much confusion, because there are no Norse Vikings in the movie. However, there is another meaning of the word "viking": a raider or plunderer, of which there are many such characters in this film. In addition, "viking" was understood internationally, having been recently used in other film titles.

== Plot summary ==
According to her father's wishes, Queen Salina agrees to share the rule of Icena with Justinian, a Roman. This decision angers both the bloodthirsty Druids and Romans less just than Justinian. As the two rulers fall in love, the Druids and the Romans begin to plot their downfall. It's not long before the hills of Britain are stained with the blood of the lovers' followers.

The plot combines elements of life of the historic queen Boudica (featuring the Iceni tribe, combat chariots) with elements seemingly drawn from Vincenzo Bellini's opera Norma, though that is set in Gaul, and William Shakespeare's King Lear.

== Cast ==
- Don Murray as Justinian
- Carita as Salina
- Donald Houston as Maelgan
- Andrew Keir as Octavian
- Adrienne Corri as Beatrice
- Niall MacGinnis as Tiberian
- Wilfrid Lawson as King Priam
- Nicola Pagett as Talia
- Percy Herbert as Catus
- Patrick Troughton as Tristram
- Sean Caffrey as Fergus
- Denis Shaw as Osiris
- Philip O'Flynn as Merchant
- Brendan Matthews as Nigel
- Gerry Alexander as Fabian
- Patrick Gardiner as Benedict
- Paul Murphy as Dalon, Maelgan's Son
- Arthur O'Sullivan as Old Man at Tax-Enquiry
- Cecil Sheridan as Shopkeeper at Protest Gathering
- Anna Manahan as Shopkeeper's Wife
- Nita Lorraine as Nubian Slave Girl
- Bryan Marshall as Dominic

== Production ==
The film was budgeted at £350,000 and went over budget by £61,000.

During filming in Ireland, Patrick Troughton, who was playing the part of Tristram, was offered the role of the Second Doctor in Doctor Who. Eventually, he accepted.

== Reception ==
The Viking Queen was given mixed reviews on its original release while it performed poorly at the box office.

For a much later television screening, David Parkinson in the Radio Times thought the film used "a story that would struggle to get a pass grade in GCSE English."; while in TV Guide a reviewer wrote that it is "an interesting, well-photographed attempt to depict the land of the blue-painted troglodytes...The costumes reveal more flesh than might have been wise in the cold, damp climate of the Irish mountains where location scenes were shot."

=== Box office ===
According to Fox records, the film needed to earn $1,625,000 in rentals to break even and made $835,000, meaning it made a loss.
