= You Can Always Duck =

1943 novel

- First edition
- Author: Peter Cheyney
- Language: English
- Series: Lemmy Caution
- Genre: Thriller
- Publisher: William Collins, Sons
- Publication date: 1943
- Publication place: United Kingdom
- Media type: Print
- Preceded by: Never a Dull Moment
- Followed by: I'll Say She Does

You Can Always Duck is a 1943 thriller novel by the British writer Peter Cheyney. It is the ninth in his series of novels featuring the FBI agent Lemmy Caution. The action takes place in wartime London where Caution is on the trail of a gang of black marketeers who have got mixed up in espionage. It was one of a number of films and novels of the period that made use of the booming black market for their setting.

== Bibliography ==
- James, Russell. Great British Fictional Detectives. Remember When, 21 Apr 2009.
- Pitts, Michael R. Famous Movie Detectives. Scarecrow Press, 1979.
- Reilly, John M. Twentieth Century Crime & Mystery Writers. Springer, 2015.
- Roodhouse, Mark. Black Market Britain: 1939-1955. OUP Oxford, 2013.
- Server, Lee. Encyclopedia of Pulp Fiction Writers. Infobase Publishing, 2014.
