= Dishonorable Discharge (film) =

- French: Ces dames préfèrent le mambo
- Directed by: Bernard Borderie
- Written by: Jacques Vilfrid; Bernard Borderie
- Produced by: Raymond Borderie
- Starring: Eddie Constantine
- Cinematography: Jacques Lemare
- Edited by: Monique Kirsanoff
- Music by: Charles Aznavour
- Release date: 1957
- Running time: 116 minutes
- Countries: France, Italy
- Language: French

Dishonorable Discharge (French: Ces dames préfèrent le mambo) is a 1957 French-Italian film starring Eddie Constantine as the American Captain Burt Brickford. The captain lives incognito on an island in Middle America since he has been accused of causing an accident and didn't trust the military court.

== Synopsis ==
Burt Brickford gets engaged as captain for a fun trip. Brickford hesitates to accept the job offer because the ship will be heading for Cuba. He is even more suspicious when his employer named Henery Legrand can provide him with a new passport. Yet Brickford is in desperate need of a new job and a new passport and so he can't decline.

When they are on sea, Brickford discovers a great deal of dynamite in Legrand's ship. He confronts Legrand who now admits to be a treasure hunter. Brickford takes him to the place where the treasure is supposed to be.

While Legrand's divers are looking in vain for a treasure, pirates attack the ship. They are led by a drug dealer named Paulo who intends to use the ship for smuggling drugs into the United States. Even so, there is no way Brickford would comply with that.

== Cast ==
- Eddie Constantine as Captain Burt Brickford
- Pascale Roberts as Constance Are
- Lino Ventura as Paolo
- Véronique Zuber as Marina Legrand
- Robert Berri as Perez
- Lise Bourdin as Claire
- Jean Murat as Henery Legrand
- Jacques Castelot as Gérard Lester
- Christian Morin as Jacques
- Jacques Seiler as Bath
- René Havard as the helmsman
- Don Ziegler as taxi driver
