= We Will Go to Deauville =

- Directed by: Francis Rigaud
- Written by: Francis Rigaud; Jacques Vilfrid
- Produced by: Ray Ventura; Jean Darvey
- Starring: Michel Serrault; Louis de Funès
- Cinematography: Jacques Robin
- Edited by: Françoise Javet
- Music by: Paul Misraki
- Production companies: Hoche Productions; Films Odéon
- Distributed by: UFA-Comacico
- Release date: 24 December 1962 (France)
- Running time: 91 minutes
- Country: France
- Language: French

We Will Go to Deauville (French: Nous irons à Deauville) is a 1962 French comedy film directed by Francis Rigaud, written by Francis Rigaud and Jacques Vilfrid, starring Michel Serrault and Louis de Funès (uncredited). The film is known under the titles: "We Will Go to Deauville" (international English titles), "Io... 2 ville e 4 scocciatori" (Italy).

== Cast ==
- Michel Serrault as Mr Lucien Moreau, a colleague of Mr Mercier
- Louis de Funès as Ludovic Lambersac, the holidaymaker
- Pascale Roberts as Mrs Monique Moreau, wife of Lucien
- Claude Brasseur as Mr Maurice Dubois, a friend of "Moreau"
- Colette Castel as Mrs Jacqueline Dubois, wife of Maurice
- Michel Galabru as Mr Mercier, the boss of Lucien
- Jean Carmet as the porter of baggages
- Marie Daëms as Marie-Laure Spiroza
- Roger Pierre as Mr Louis, owner of a hardware shop
- Jean-Marc Thibault as Mr Paul, the other owner of a hardware shop
- Maurice Cafarelli as the elder son of Mr Mercier
- Sacha Distel as singer
- Paul Préboist as The priest
