= Fabienne Dali =

Belgian actress

- Born: Marie-Louise De Vos; 22 September 1941 (age 84); The Bahamas
- Occupation: Actress
- Years active: 1960–1969

Fabienne Dali (born Marie-Louise De Vos; 22 September 1941) is a Belgian actress. She appeared in more than fifteen films from 1960 to 1969.

== Selected filmography ==
Year	Title	Role	Notes
1968	The Killer Likes Candy		
1968	Mayerling	Mitzi Kaspar	
1967	Desert Commandos	Simone	
1966	Kill, Baby, Kill	Ruth	
1965	Super Seven Calling Cairo	Denise	
1965	Agent 077: From the Orient with Fury	Simone Degas	
1964	La baie du désir	Greta / La maitresse / la femme	
1963	Tomy's Secret	Sylvia	
1962	Le Doulos	Fabienne	
1961	Destination Fury	Gianna	
