= La môme vert-de-gris =

La môme vert-de-gris Released in the USA as Poison Ivy
- Poster of the French movie
- Directed by: Bernard Borderie
- Written by: Jacques Berland Screenplay; Bernard Borderie Screenplay
- Based on: Poison Ivy by Peter Cheyney
- Starring: Eddie Constantine; Dominique Wilms; Howard Vernon
- Cinematography: Gaston Raulet
- Edited by: Jean Feyte
- Music by: Guy Lafarge
- Production companies: Compagnie Industrielle Commerciale Cinématographique; Société Nouvelle Pathé Cinéma (France)
- Distributed by: Pathé Consortium Cinéma
- Release date: 27 May 1953
- Running time: 98 minutes
- Country: France
- Language: French

La môme vert-de-gris (French for "The Greyish-Green Dame"), released in the USA as Poison Ivy, is a 1953 French crime film.

It was French director Bernard Borderie's first film, as well as American-born French actor Eddie Constantine's. The screenplay is based on the 1937 Lemmy Caution thriller Poison Ivy by Peter Cheyney, which had been in 1945 the first title published in Marcel Duhamel's Série noire. The story involves FBI agent Caution investigating gold smuggling activity in Casablanca.

== Crew ==
- Director: Bernard Borderie
- Screenplay: Bernard Borderie and Jacques Berland
- Assistant director: André Smagghe
- Cinematography: Jacques Lemare
- Music: Guy Lafarge

== Cast ==
- Eddie Constantine - Lemmy Caution
- Dominique Wilms - Carlotta de la Rue
- Howard Vernon - Rudy Saltierra
- Darío Moreno - Joe Madrigal
- Maurice Ronet - Mickey
- Nicolas Vogel - Kerts
- Philippe Hersent - Le commissaire
- Jess Hahn - Le marin-geolier
- Gaston Modot - Instructor #1
- Paul Azaïs - bistrot customer
- Don Ziegler - FBI director

== Synopsis ==
Set in Casablanca, it recycles aspects of the atmospheric noirish French films of the 1930s together with pulp-fiction American detective films of the post-war period. Considered either "tongue-in-cheek" or "doddery", the film "utilizes all the rules of the genre, albeit without convictions: chases, fistfights, nightclubs, unusual settings, knowing winks at the public".

It was a commercial success in France (3,846,158 French entries in 1953) and was followed by 7 other Lemmy Caution films until 1967, not counting Jean-Luc Godard's "incomprehensible" Alphaville, a strange adventure of Lemmy Caution, casting Constantine and Vernon. Constantine's enduring success started with this. This film was considered "emblematic of French postwar attitudes towards the United States: a fascination for U.S. culture tempered by fear of U.S. dominance".
