= Mizzi Kaspar =

Austrian actress and mistress of prince Rudolf

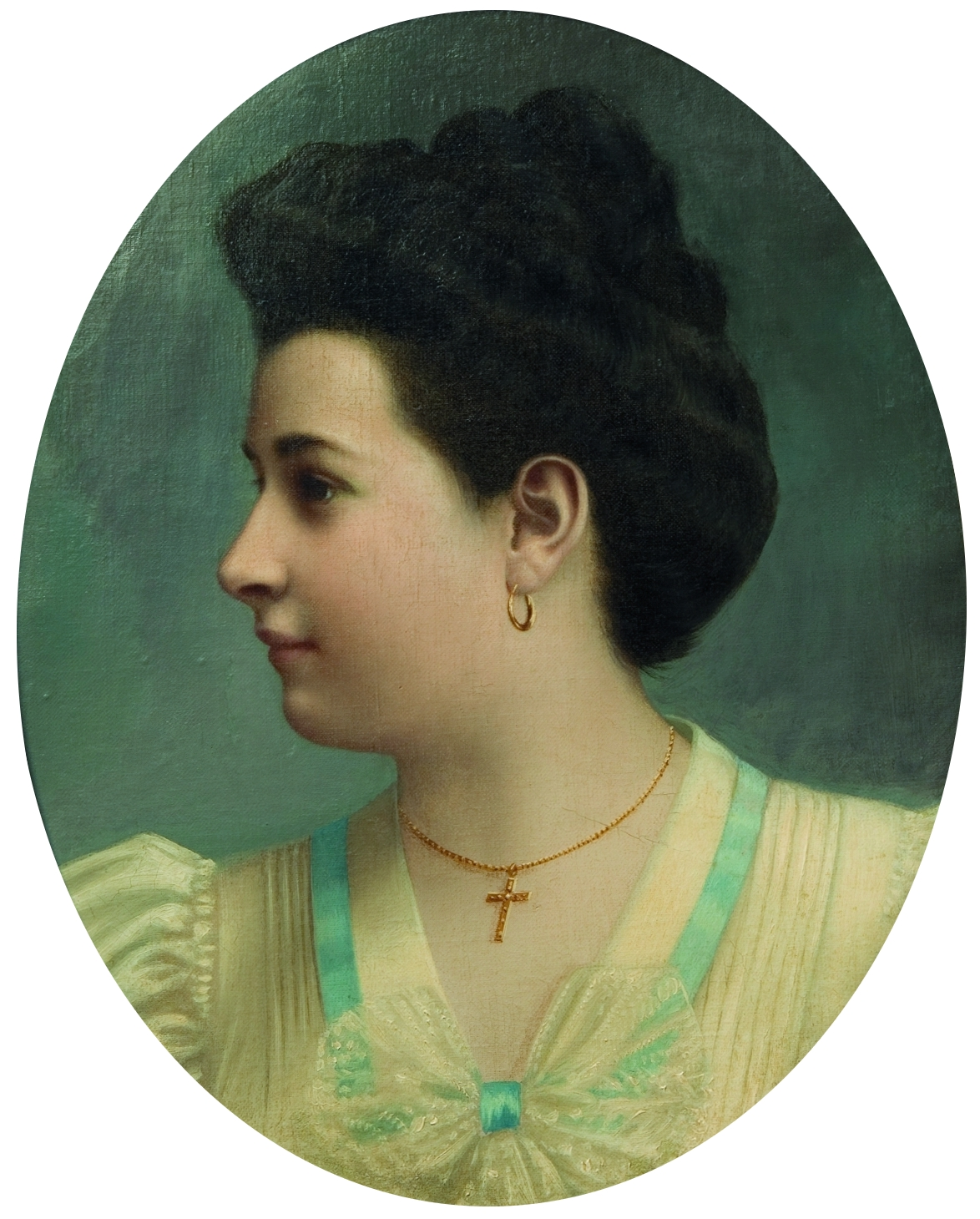
Mizzi Kaspar

Mizzi Kaspar, or Mitzi Kaspar (September 28, 1864 – January 29, 1907), was an Austrian actress and the royal mistress of Rudolf, Crown Prince of Austria.

== Biography ==
Kaspar was an actress.

Prince Rudolf is said to have spent large sums of money on her, especially by way of gifts, including 60,000 florins shortly before his death. R. H. Bruce Lockhart called her "the real love of his life".

Mizzi Kaspar eventually died from syphilis.

== The Mayerling Incident ==
Rudolf told Kaspar about his wish to commit suicide, and tried to convince her to engage in a suicide pact with him. She declined and tried to inform the police, but her report was ignored. According to some historians, Kaspar was Prince Rudolf's first choice to join his suicide pact. When she refused he turned to his other mistress, Baroness Mary Vetsera.

According to Serge Schmemann:

Prince Rudolf had in fact contemplated suicide for at least a half year before his death. He initially asked the first love of his life, one Mitzi Kaspar, to share his fate, but the 24-year-old woman declined.

== In popular culture ==
Prince Rudolf's affairs and suicide at Mayerling have been dramatised in books, ballets, plays and movies. Kaspar was portrayed by Fabienne Dali in the 1968 film Mayerling.
