= Eddie Constantine =

American singer and actor (1913–1993)

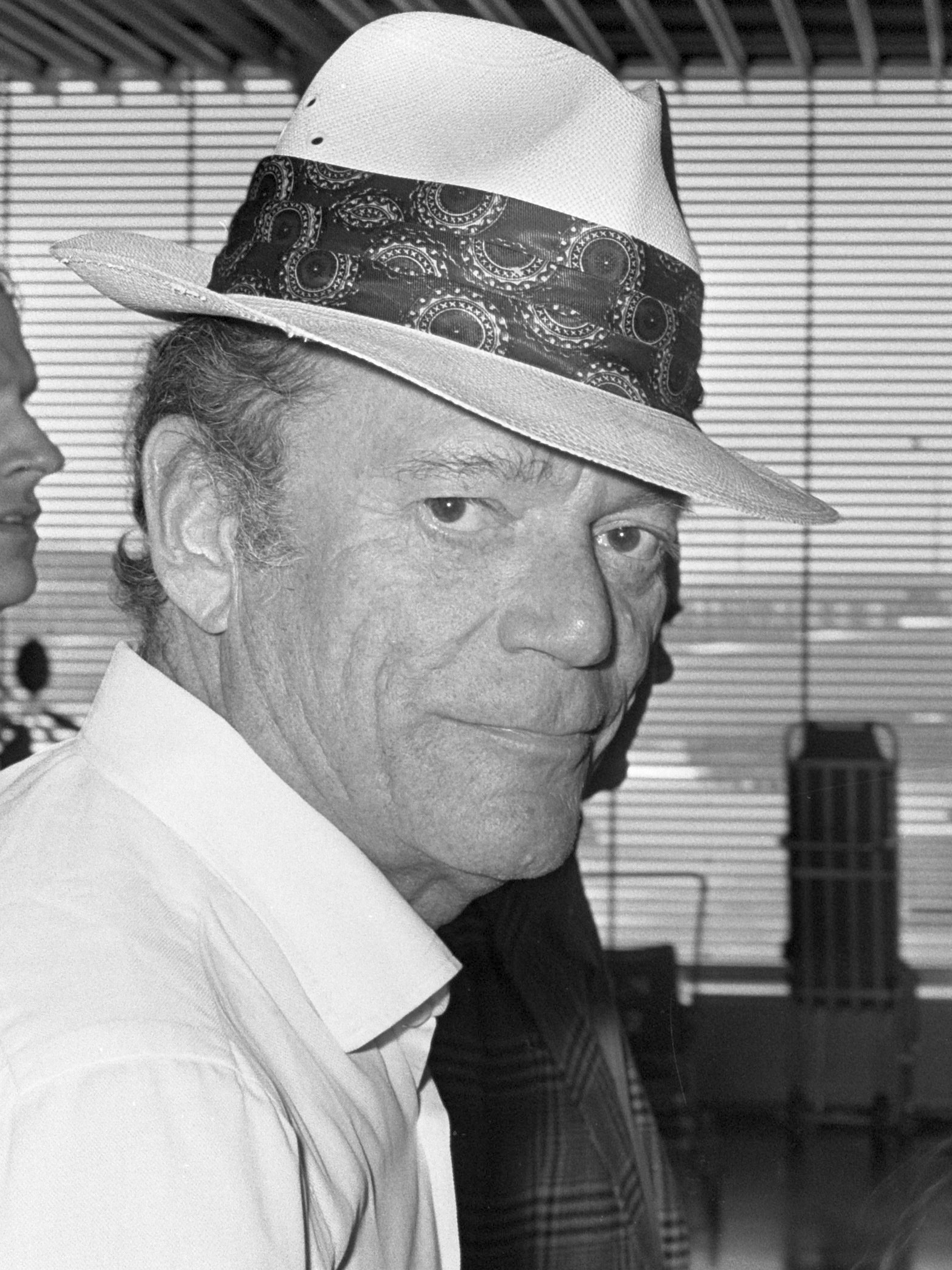
- Constantine in 1972
- Born: Edward Israel Constantinowsky; October 29, 1913; Los Angeles, California, U.S.
- Died: February 25, 1993 (aged 79); Wiesbaden, Germany
- Other name: Israel Constantine
- Years active: 1936–1993
- Spouses: Helene Musil (m. 1942; div. 1976) Dorothea Gibson (m. 1977; div. 1977) Maya Faber-Jansen (m. 1979)
- Children: 4
- Musical career
- Genres: Chanson; French pop; cabaret
- Occupations: Singer, songwriter
- Instrument: Vocals

Israel Constantine (born Edward Israel Constantinowsky; October 29, 1913 – February 25, 1993), known as Eddie Constantine, was an American singer, actor and entertainer who spent most of his career in France. He became well-known to film audiences for his portrayal of secret agent Lemmy Caution and other, similar pulp heroes in French B-movies of the 1950s and 1960s.

His celebrity and status as something of a pop icon saw him work with prominent arthouse directors like Jean-Luc Godard (as Lemmy Caution in Alphaville and Germany Year 90 Nine Zero), Rainer Werner Fassbinder, Agnès Varda, Rosa von Praunheim, Lars von Trier, William Klein and Mika Kaurismäki.

== Early life ==
Constantine was born Edward Israel Constantinowsky in Los Angeles, California to Jewish immigrant parents, a Russian father and Polish mother; his father was a jeweler. He later changed his name to Israel Constantine.

In pursuit of a singing career, he went to Vienna for voice training. However, when he returned to the United States, his career failed to take off, and he started taking work as a film extra.

== Career ==
Having failed to make a career in the United States, Constantine returned to Europe in the early 1950s and started singing and performing in Paris cabarets. He was noticed by Edith Piaf, who cast him in the musical La p'tite Lili. Constantine also helped Piaf with translations for her 1956 album La Vie en Rose/Édith Piaf Sings In English and so he has songwriting credits on the English versions of some of her most famous songs (especially "Hymne à l'amour"/"Hymn to Love").

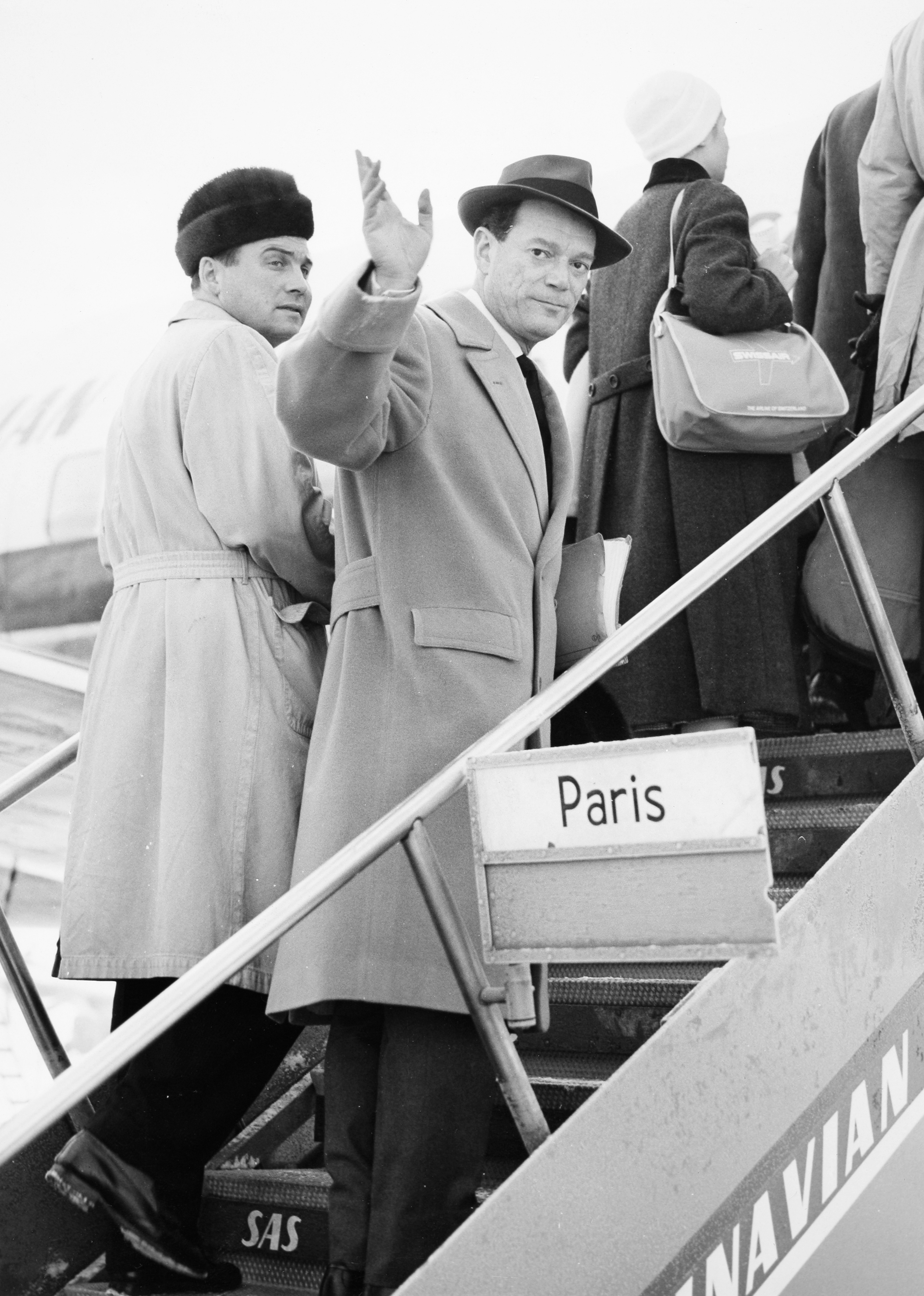
Eddie Constantine at the airport in Copenhagen, 1958

In the 1950s, Constantine was a star in France because of his role as the hard-boiled detective/secret agent Lemmy Caution (from Peter Cheyney's novels) in a series of French B-pictures, including La môme vert-de-gris (1953), This Man Is Dangerous (1953), Je suis un sentimental (1955), Lemmy pour les dames (1961) and Your Turn, Darling (1963).

He was hired by the Rank Organisation to play the lead in SOS Pacific but it was not a big success.

When not playing Lemmy Caution, Constantine often played a character that was still typically a suave-talking, seductive, smooth guy although he often played that for laughs. He turned his accent and perceived American cockiness to advantage in such roles, and he later described his film persona as having been "James Bond before James Bond".

One of his best remembered later roles was as the visiting Mafia boss Charlie in the British gangster film The Long Good Friday (1980), a rare English-speaking role.

One of his most notable roles was in Jean-Luc Godard's Alphaville (1965), in which he reprised (to a more radical end) the role of Lemmy Caution, in a departure from the style of his other films. His box-office appeal in France waned in the mid-1960s. Having married a German television producer, he eventually relocated to Germany, where he worked as a character actor, appearing in German television dramas as well as film. Constantine later claimed that he had never taken his acting career seriously, as he considered himself to be a singer by trade, and that he had been an actor strictly for the money. In 1982 he appeared in Rosa von Praunheim's film Red Love. He worked with several other directors including Godard and Rainer Werner Fassbinder, and his last notable film appearance was in Lars von Trier's Europa in 1991. He had taken up the part of Lemmy for the last time that year, in Godard's experimental film Germany Year 90 Nine Zero.

== Personal life ==
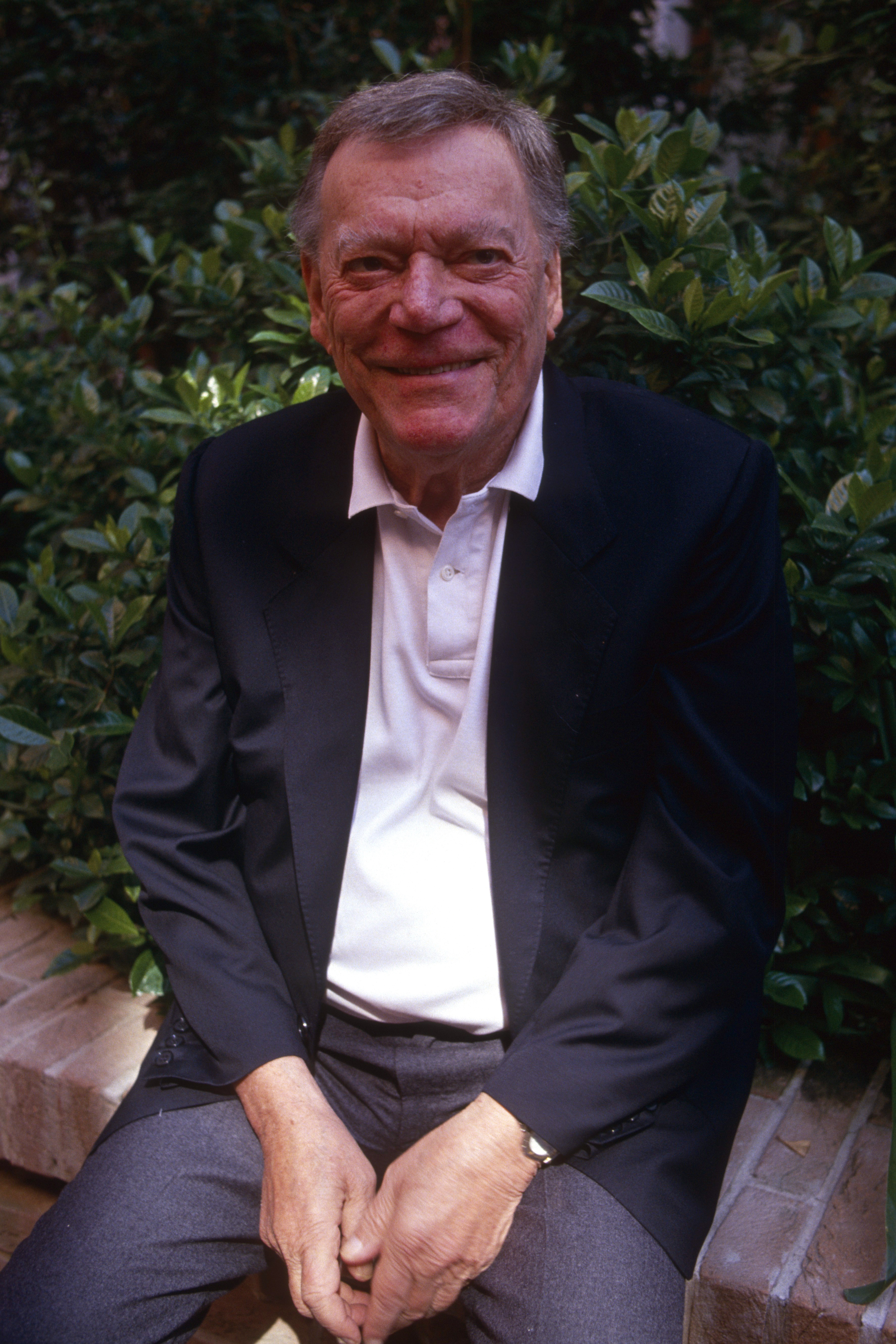
Eddie Constantine in the 1990s

Constantine was married three times: to Helene Musil (1942-1976, divorced), with whom he had three children; Dorothea Gibson (1977, divorced); and the film producer Maya Faber-Jansen (1979–1993, Constantine's death), with whom he had one child.

=== Death ===
Constantine died of a heart attack on February 25, 1993 in Wiesbaden, Germany, aged 79. His remains were cremated and remanded to Paris.

== Filmography ==
=== Film ===
Year	Title	Role	Director	Notes
1953	Egypt by Three	Nick	Victor Stoloff	(third episode)
1953	La môme vert-de-gris	Lemmy Caution	Bernard Borderie	
1953	This Man Is Dangerous	Lemmy Caution	Jean Sacha	
1954	Dames Don't Care	Lemmy Caution	Bernard Borderie	
1954	Avanzi di galera	Franco Cesari	Vittorio Cottafavi	
1954	Yours Truly, Blake	Larry Blake	Jean Laviron	
1955	Give 'em Hell	Johnny Jordan	John Berry	
1955	Je suis un sentimental	Barney Morgan	John Berry	
1955	Vous pigez ?	Lemmy Caution	Pierre Chevalier	
1956	Ce soir les jupons volent	Monsieur Howard	Dimitri Kirsanoff	Uncredited
1956	Folies-Bergère	Bob Wellington	Henri Decoin	
1956	Man and Child	Fred Barker	Raoul André	
1956	Bonsoir Paris, bonjour l'amour	cameo appearance	Ralph Baum	
1957	Et par ici la sortie	Eddie	Willy Rozier	Uncredited
1957	Le Grand Bluff	Eddie F. Morgan	Patrice Dally	
1957	Ces dames préfèrent le mambo	Burt Brickford	Bernard Borderie	
1957	Les Truands	Jim Esposito	Carlo Rim	
1958	Incognito	Bob Stanley	Patrice Dally	
1958	Hoppla, jetzt kommt Eddie	Eddie Petersen	Werner Klingler	
1958	Passport to Shame	Johnny McVey	Alvin Rakoff	
1959	Du rififi chez les femmes	Interpol Agent Williams	Alex Joffé	
1959	The Treasure of San Teresa (Hot Money Girl)	Larry Brennan	Alvin Rakoff	
1959	SOS Pacific	Mark Reisner	Guy Green	
1960	Bombs on Monte Carlo	Captain Eddie Cronen	Georg Jacoby	
1960	Women Are Like That	Lemmy Caution	Bernard Borderie	
1960	Jack of Spades	Patrick	Yves Allégret	
1960	Ravishing	Himself	Robert Lamoureux	Uncredited cameo
1960	Ça va être ta fête	John Lewis / John Jarvis	Pierre Montazel	
1961	Me faire ça à moi	Eddie MacAvoy	Pierre Grimblat	
1961	Destination Fury	Felice Esposito	Giorgio Bianchi	
1961	Cause toujours, mon lapin	Jackson	Guy Lefranc	
1962	Une grosse tête	Napoléon "Naps" Dubois	Claude de Givray	
1962	The Seven Deadly Sins	cameo appearance	Jean-Luc Godard	(segment "La paresse")
1962	Lemmy pour les dames	Lemmy Caution	Bernard Borderie	
1962	Cléo from 5 to 7	Man with Hose	Agnès Varda	Uncredited cameo
1962	Lykke og krone	cameo appearance	Colbjørn Helander and Stein Saelen	
1962	Good Luck, Charlie	Charlie	Jean-Louis Richard	
1962	L'Empire de la nuit	Eddie	Pierre Grimblat	
1962	Nous irons à Deauville	Friend of Pin-Up Girl	Francis Rigaud	Uncredited cameo
1963	Jeff Gordon, Secret Agent	Jeff Gordon	Raoul André	
1963	Les Femmes d'abord	Bobby Carao	Raoul André	
1963	Tela de araña	Eddie Ross	José Luis Monter	
1963	Your Turn, Darling	Lemmy Caution	Bernard Borderie	
1964	Die ganze Welt ist himmelblau	Himself	Franz Antel	
1964	How Do You Like My Sister?	Himself	Michel Boisrond	
1964	Let the Shooters Shoot	Jeff Gordon	Guy Lefranc	
1964	Nick Carter va tout casser	Nick Carter	Henri Decoin	
1964	Lucky Jo	Lucky Jo	Michel Deville	
1965	Ces dames s'en mêlent	Jeff Gordon	Raoul André	
1965	Faites vos jeux, mesdames	Mike Warner	Marcel Ophuls	
1965	Cent briques et des tuiles	Le consommateur au bar	Pierre Grimblat	
1965	Alphaville	Lemmy Caution	Jean-Luc Godard	
1965	Je vous salue, mafia!	Rudy Hamberg	Raoul Lévy	
1965	Nick Carter and Red Club	Nick Carter	Jean-Paul Savignac	
1966	Attack of the Robots	Al Pereira	Jesus Franco	
1968	Residencia para espías (transl. Boarding House for Spies)	Dan Leyton	Jesus Franco	
1968	Ces messieurs de la famille	Cousin Lemmy	Raoul André	
1968	À tout casser	Ric	John Berry	
1969	Les Gros Malins	Eddie	Raymond Leboursier	
1969	Lions Love	Himself	Agnès Varda	
1971	Beware of a Holy Whore	Himself	Rainer Werner Fassbinder	
1971	Haytabo	Professor	Ulli Lommel	
1973	Geen paniek	Bill Silkstocking	Ko Koedijk	
1974	Une baleine qui avait mal aux dents	Eddie	Jacques Bral	
1975	Souvenir of Gibraltar	Father Jo	Henri Xhonneux	
1975	A Second Spring	Frank Cabot	Ulli Lommel	
1977	Bloedverwanten	Priest	Wim Lindner	
1977	Le Couple témoin	Dr. Goldberg	William Klein	
1978	It Lives Again	Dr. Forrest	Larry Cohen	
1979	The Third Generation	Peter Lurz	Rainer Werner Fassbinder	
1979	Ticket of No Return (Bildnis einer Trinkerin)	Küstler	Ulrike Ottinger	
1980	Exit... nur keine Panik	Poigrard	Franz Novotny	
1980	Panic Time	Lemmy Caution	Udo Lindenberg	
1980	Car-napping	police officer Laroux	Wigbert Wicker	
1980	The Long Good Friday	Charlie	John Mackenzie	
1981	Die Alptraumfrau		Lothar Lambert	
1981	Tango durch Deutschland	Eddie	Lutz Mommartz	
1981	Neige	Pierrot	Juliet Berto et Jean-Henri Roger	
1981	Freak Orlando	Säulenheiliger	Ulrike Ottinger	
1982	Red Love	Pawel Pawlowitsch	Rosa von Praunheim	
1982	Boxoffice	Hugh Barren	Josef Bogdanovitch	
1983	Non-Stop Trouble with Spies	Gregori Ustinov	Ottokar Runze	
1983	La Bête noire	the bar proprietor	Patrick Chaput	
1983	Das Mikado Projekt	Beppo Bourbon	Torsten Emrich	
1984	Flight to Berlin	Himself	Christopher Petit	
1984	Uno scugnizzo a New York	Sammy	Mariano Laurenti	
1984	Tiger: Springtime in Vienna	Lemmy Caution	Peter Patzak	
1984	Seifenblasen		Alfred Ninaus	
1985	Seifenblasen	cameo appearance	Alfred Ninaus	
1985	Paul Chevrolet en de ultieme hallucinatie	Boy Pappa	Pim de la Parra	
1986	Makaroni Blues	Lemmy Caution	Bela Csepesanyi	
1987	Freckled Max and the Spooks	Alojz	Juraj Jakubisko	
1987	Helsinki Napoli All Night Long	Old Gangster	Mika Kaurismäki	
1989	Europa, abends	Mr. Hardayle	Claudia Schröder	
1991	Europa	Colonel Harris	Lars von Trier	
1991	Germany Year 90 Nine Zero	Lemmy Caution	Jean-Luc Godard	
1991	Tokyo no kyujitsu	William Wright	Naoki Nagao	
1993	Three Shake-a-leg Steps to Heaven	Don Fabrizzi	Andy Bausch	
2010	Dimension	N/A	Lars von Trier	Unfinished; filmed between 1990-97

=== Television ===
Year	Title	Role	Director	Notes
1970	Malatesta	Malatesta	Peter Lilienthal	TV movie
1970	Eine Rose für Jane	Boss	Hans W. Geißendörfer	TV movie
1971	Supergirl	Partygast bei Polonsky	Rudolf Thome	TV movie
1973	World on a Wire	Man in car	Rainer Werner Fassbinder	
1976	Raid on Entebbe	Capt. Michel Bacos	Irvin Kershner	TV movie
1984	Rambo Zambo	Harry	Reinhard Donga	TV movie
1986	Roncalli	Pablo	Michael Mackenroth	
1987	Frankenstein's Aunt	Alois - Water Spirit	Juraj Jakubisko	7 episodes
1989	Le retour de Lemmy Caution	Lemmy Caution	Josée Dayan	TV movie
