= A Bullet in the Gun Barrel =

1958 film

- Directed by: Michel Deville; Charles Gérard
- Written by: Albert Simonin; Charles Gérard; Michel Deville
- Starring: Pierre Vaneck
- Release date: 19 November 1958
- Running time: 95 minutes
- Country: France
- Language: French

A Bullet in the Gun Barrel (French: Une balle dans le canon) is a 1958 French crime film directed by Michel Deville and Charles Gérard.

== Plot ==
Two young paratroopers returning from Indochina, Tony and Dick, invest the 25 million entrusted to them by a man known as "the Maltese" in a Pigalle club called the Tip Tap, but he reappears and demands his money. Forced to sell, the two young men are double-crossed by Pépère, the former owner of the club, who is killed along with Dick while Tony is arrested for a murder he did not commit.

== Cast ==
- Pierre Vaneck as Tony
- Mijanou Bardot as Brigitte Geoffrain
- Paul Frankeur as Pépère
- Roger Hanin as Dick
- Hazel Scott as herself (nightclub singer)
- Gérard Buhr as Alberto
- Michael Lonsdale as Mr Doory (champagne salesman)
- Mario David as the ousted protector
- Don Ziegler as the Maltese
