= Klaus Kauroff =

German professional wrestler

Personal information
- Born: Klaus Kauroff; 24 January 1941 Hanover, Germany
- Died: 24 November 2020 (aged 79)

Professional wrestling career
- Ring name: Klaus Kauroff
- Billed height: 5"11
- Billed weight: 264 lb (120 kg)
- Trained by: Umeyuki Kiyomigawa
- Debut: 1967
- Retired: 1996

Klaus Kauroff (January 24, 1941 – November 24, 2020) was a German professional wrestler, and actor who spent the majority of his career in Germany. He also wrestled in Japan, United Kingdom and other European countries.

== Professional wrestling career ==
Trained by Japanese wrestler Umeyuki Kiyomigawa, Kauroff made his debut in 1967 in West Germany. In 1970, he went to Japan as Messerschimdt for International Wrestling Enterprise. During most of his career, he worked for Catch Wrestling Association in Germany. In 1981, he won the Catcher des Jahres in Verband der Berufsringer. He retired from wrestling in 1996.

== Death ==
Kauroff passed away on November 24, 2020, at 79.

== Championships and accomplishments ==
- Verband der Berufsringer
  - Catcher des Jahres (1981)
