= Gaia Germani =

Italian film and television actress (1934–2019)

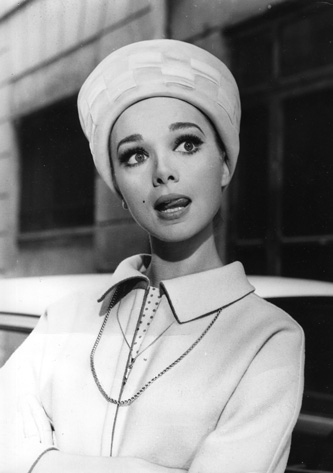
- Born: Giovanna Giardina; 30 August 1934; Rome, Kingdom of Italy
- Died: 20 February 2019 (aged 84); Rome, Italy
- Occupation: Actress

Gaia Germani (born Giovanna Giardina; 30 August 1934 – 20 February 2019) was an Italian film and television actress.

== Biography ==
Born in Rome, Germani made her film debut in a French film, Georges Lautner's En plein cirage and later starred both in Italian and in French productions, working with Sergio Sollima, Bernard Borderie, Marco Ferreri, and Lucio Fulci. She became popular for starring in the Carosello of Amaro Cora. From the early 1970s, she focused on TV series, and in 1975, she retired from showbusiness.

She died in Rome in 2019.

== Partial filmography ==
- Hercules in the Haunted World (1961)
- Operation Gold Ingot (1962)
- The Triumph of Robin Hood (1962)
- The Eye of the Monocle (1962)
- Your Turn, Darling (1963)
- The Reluctant Spy (1963)
- Castle of the Living Dead (1964)
- I complessi (1965)
- Marcia nuziale (1965)
- OSS 77 – Operazione fior di loto (1965)
- Avenger X (1967)
- Devil in the Brain (1972)
