= Guy Delorme =

French actor (1929–2005)

- Born: 23 May 1929; Mary-sur-Marne, France
- Died: 26 December 2005 (aged 76); Bry-sur-Marne, France
- Occupation: Actor
- Years active: 1951-1984

Guy Delorme (23 May 1929 – 26 December 2005) was a French actor. He appeared in more than seventy films from 1951 to 1984.

== Filmography ==
Year	Title	Role	Notes
1951	Sous le ciel de Paris		Uncredited
1956	Pardonnez nos offenses		
1957	Love in the Afternoon	Gigolo	Uncredited
1958	Cerf-volant du bout du monde		
1959	Le Bossu		
1960	Austerlitz	Exelmans	
1960	Captain Blood	Rinaldo	
1960	Fortunat	Un Allemand	Uncredited
1961	Vive Henri IV, vive l'amour		
1961	Captain Fracasse	Un homme du prince de Moussy	
1961	Le Miracle des loups	De Sénac	
1961	The Three Musketeers	Rochefort	
1962	Lemmy pour les dames	Mirko	
1962	The Mysteries of Paris	Un policier	
1962	Le Chevalier de Pardaillan	Maurevert	
1963	Rocambole	Commissaire Agus	
1963	Your Turn, Darling	Elmer Whittaker	
1964	Hardi Pardaillan!	Maurevert	
1964	Coplan, agent secret FX 18	Lattina	
1964	The Gorillas	Le Toulousain	Uncredited
1965	The Sucker	Luigi - un homme de Mickey	
1965	Le Majordome	Un homme du commando	
1965	OSS 117 Mission for a Killer	Karl	
1966	La Sentinelle endormie	Un officier	
1966	Hotel Paradiso	Policeman in Hotel	Uncredited
1966	Four Queens for an Ace	Jésus, Gregory's Hitman	
1967	Sept hommes et une garce		
1967	Fantômas contre Scotland Yard	Le chef de la mafia	
1967	The Last Adventure	Un tueur	
1967	I Killed Rasputin	A Russian soldier	Uncredited
1967	Dead Run	Henchman #5	Uncredited
1967	Le Fou du labo 4	Un acteur du western	Uncredited
1967	Les grandes vacances	Un marin au bistrot	
1968	Adieu l'ami	Un homme à Neuilly	Uncredited
1968	The Return of Monte Cristo	Un bagarreur au bar	Uncredited
1969	The Southern Star	Michael	
1969	The Brain	Un complice	Uncredited
1969	Mon oncle Benjamin	Un laquais	Uncredited
1970	L'Ardoise	Un détenu	Uncredited
1970	Atlantic Wall	Marin Allemand	
1970	Laisse aller... c'est une valse		Uncredited
1974	Lorna the Exorcist	Patrick Mariel	
1975	That Most Important Thing: Love	Un homme de main de Mazelli	Uncredited
1975	L'Intrépide	Un homme de Canello	
1977	Das Frauenhaus	Bergen	
1978	Perceval le Gallois	Clamadieu des Iles	
1979	Moonraker	Tree Assassin	Uncredited
1981	Teheran 43	One of the murderers of Roche	Uncredited
1983	On l'appelle Catastrophe		
1984	Le Fou du roi	D'Artagnan	
