= Robert Berri =

French actor (1912–1989)

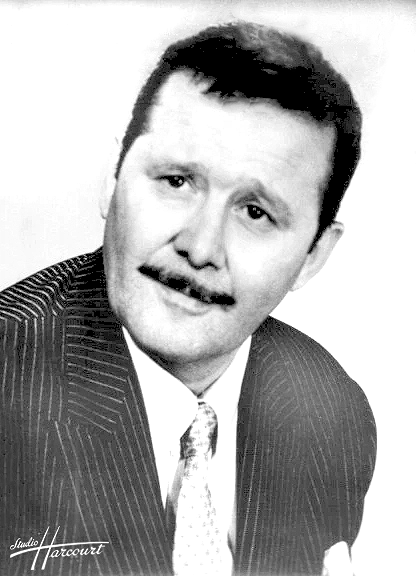
- Robert Berri's Image
- Born: 16 December 1912; Paris, France
- Died: 22 November 1989 (aged 76); Rueil-Malmaison, France
- Occupation: Actor
- Years active: 1937–1979

Robert Berri (16 December 1912 – 22 November 1989) was a French film actor. He appeared in 100 films between 1937 and 1979.

== Selected filmography ==
Year	Title	Role	Notes
1947	Four Knaves	Philibert	
1948	White as Snow	Bob	
1949	Five Red Tulips	Jacques Mauval	
1950	The Unexpected Voyager	Paolo	
1951	Paris Vice Squad	Inspecteur Paulan	
1951	The King of Camelots	Grand Jo	
1951	The Red Inn	Le Cocher	
1951	Un amour de parapluie		
1952	The Damned Lovers	Paul Morelli	
1954	The Women Couldn't Care Less	Fernandez / Jean Termiglio	
1954	The Lost Girl	Pierre Labry	
1954	Rasputin	Le capitaine Soukoff	
1954	Le Blé en herbe		
1954	Crime at the Concert Mayol	Fred	
1955	Your Turn, Callaghan	Raoul de Bois-Joli dit le Vicomte	
1955	More Whiskey for Callaghan	Comte Haragos	
1956	The Babes in the Secret Service	Carboni	
1957	Ces dames préfèrent le mambo	Perez	
1958	Le désordre et la nuit	Marquis	
1960	The Cat Shows Her Claws	Le chauffeur du camion lors de l'accident simulé	
1961	The Three Musketeers	M. Bonacieux	
1968	Leontine	Un conseiller de Charles	
1971	La Part des lions	Le patron du bistrot	
1972	Sweet Deception	Le client qui dîne	
1974	Un linceul n'a pas de poches	Le militant communiste	
