= Paul Misraki =

French composer (1908–1998)

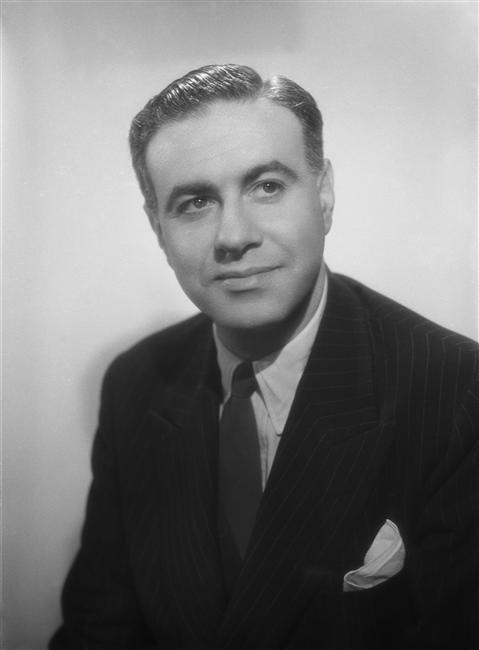
Photograph of Paul Misraki from 1948

Paul Misraki (28 January 1908 – 29 October 1998) was a French composer of popular music and film scores. Over the course of over 60 years, Misraki wrote the music to 130 films, scoring works by directors like Jean Renoir, Claude Chabrol, Jacques Becker, Jean-Pierre Melville, Jean-Luc Godard, Henri-Georges Clouzot, Orson Welles, Luis Buñuel and Roger Vadim.

For his work, he was made a Chevalier de la Legion d'Honneur.

== Biography and film career ==
Born Paul Misrachi in Constantinople, Ottoman Empire (now Istanbul, Turkey) into a French Jewish family of Italian descent, Misraki showed an early aptitude for music. He went to Paris to study classical composition, and by the 1930s had become an established jazz pianist, arranger, and writer of popular songs; around this time he began composing film scores, with his first known work being for Jean Renoir's first sound film, On purge bébé (Baby's Laxative, 1931), for which he was not credited.

Like Renoir, Misraki fled France during the World War II German occupation. After a brief stay in Argentina, Misraki ended up in Hollywood, where he composed the music to all of Renoir's American films. After the war, Misraki returned to France, working busily throughout the 1950s, a period when he was routinely scoring half a dozen or more films a year. These included numerous films by Yves Allégret and Jean Boyer, as well as two films by Jacques Becker, Ali Baba and the Forty Thieves (Ali Baba et les 40 voleurs, 1954) and Montparnasse 19 (1958) and Orson Welles' Mr. Arkadin (1955). The 1960s saw Misraki slow down slightly, writing only 2–3 scores a year. During this period, he worked with many of the leading French directors of the period, including Jean-Luc Godard on Alphaville (1965), Jean-Pierre Melville on Le Doulos (1963) and Claude Chabrol, for whom he scored several films.

Misraki composed intermittently throughout the last two decades of his life. He composed his last score at age 85; by this point he had been working almost exclusively in television for several years. He died of natural causes at age 90 in Paris.

=== Career as composer of popular songs ===
Misraki first found acclaim as a composer and lyricist of popular songs. His first hit was 1935's "Tout va très bien madame la marquise," and during his careers in France, America and Argentina he wrote successful songs in French, English and Spanish. In 1998, at the age of 90 years, Misraki collaborates with Singer Raquel Bitton on her American tribute to his songs in a CD entitled In a Jazzy mood.

=== Other interests ===
Outside music, Misraki was interested in religion, Ufology and extraterrestrial life. Misraki was an early proponent of the ancient astronaut hypothesis. In 1962 Misraki published his book Les Extraterrestres in France which was later reprinted in English under the title of Flying Saucers Through The Ages in 1965, he first published the book under the pen name of Paul Thomas as he believed that if his real identity was revealed, his reputation as a musician might be damaged; however, he later revealed his identity, and a number of American editions of the book were published under his real name. In the book, Misraki claimed that angels from the Bible were aliens, that the Bible and other ancient texts are filled with many UFO flying saucer sightings, and that throughout human history there was intervention from extraterrestrial aliens. Misraki was also one of the first authors to suggest that apparitions may be UFO related phenomena.

Ufologist Jacques Vallée studied some of Misraki's UFO theories and visited Misraki in Paris in September 1962 to discuss them with him, in his journals Vallée described Misraki as a "deeply reflective man" and a "religious scholar".

Misraki was also a supporter of Pierre Teilhard de Chardin and his theory of omega point, and wrote a number of papers on his work.

== Selected filmography ==
- American Love (1931)
- Coralie and Company (1934)
- Moutonnet (1936)
- Claudine at School (1937)
- The House Opposite (1937)
- Return at Dawn (1938)
- Chéri-Bibi (1938)
- Beautiful Star (1938)
- I Was an Adventuress (1938)
- Whirlwind of Paris (1939)
- Place de la Concorde (1939)
- The Duraton Family (1939)
- Prince Bouboule (1939)
- Beating Heart (1940)
- Seven Women (1944)
- Devil and the Angel (1946)
- Loves, Delights and Organs (1947)
- Are You Sure? (1947)
- Christmas with the Poor (1947)
- All Roads Lead to Rome (1949)
- Thirst of Men (1950)
- The Prize (1950)
- They Are Twenty (1950)
- Dr. Knock (1951)
- Dirty Hands (1951)
- Savage Triangle (1951)
- Young Love (1951)
- Crazy for Love (1952)
- Desperate Decision (1952)
- The Man in My Life (1952)
- Women of Paris (1953)
- Napoleon Road (1953)
- Ali Baba and the Forty Thieves (1954)
- The Women Couldn't Care Less (1954)
- Queen Margot (1954)
- Mr. Arkadin (1955)
- The Little Rebels (1955)
- Stopover in Orly (1955)
- My Priest Among the Poor (1956)
- The Lebanese Mission (1956)
- Fernandel the Dressmaker (1956)
- And God Created Woman (1956)
- A Bomb for a Dictator (1957)
- Sénéchal the Magnificent (1957)
- Three Murderesses (1958)
- The Gendarme of Champignol (1959)
- Women Are Like That (1960)
- Rendezvous (1961)
- We Will Go to Deauville (1962)
- Alphaville (1965)
- The Majordomo (1965)
- Attack of the Robots (1966)
- Sept hommes et une garce (1967)
- Juliette and Juliette (1974)
- The Porter from Maxim's (1976)
