= 1947 in literature =

This article contains information about the literary events and publications of 1947.

== Events ==
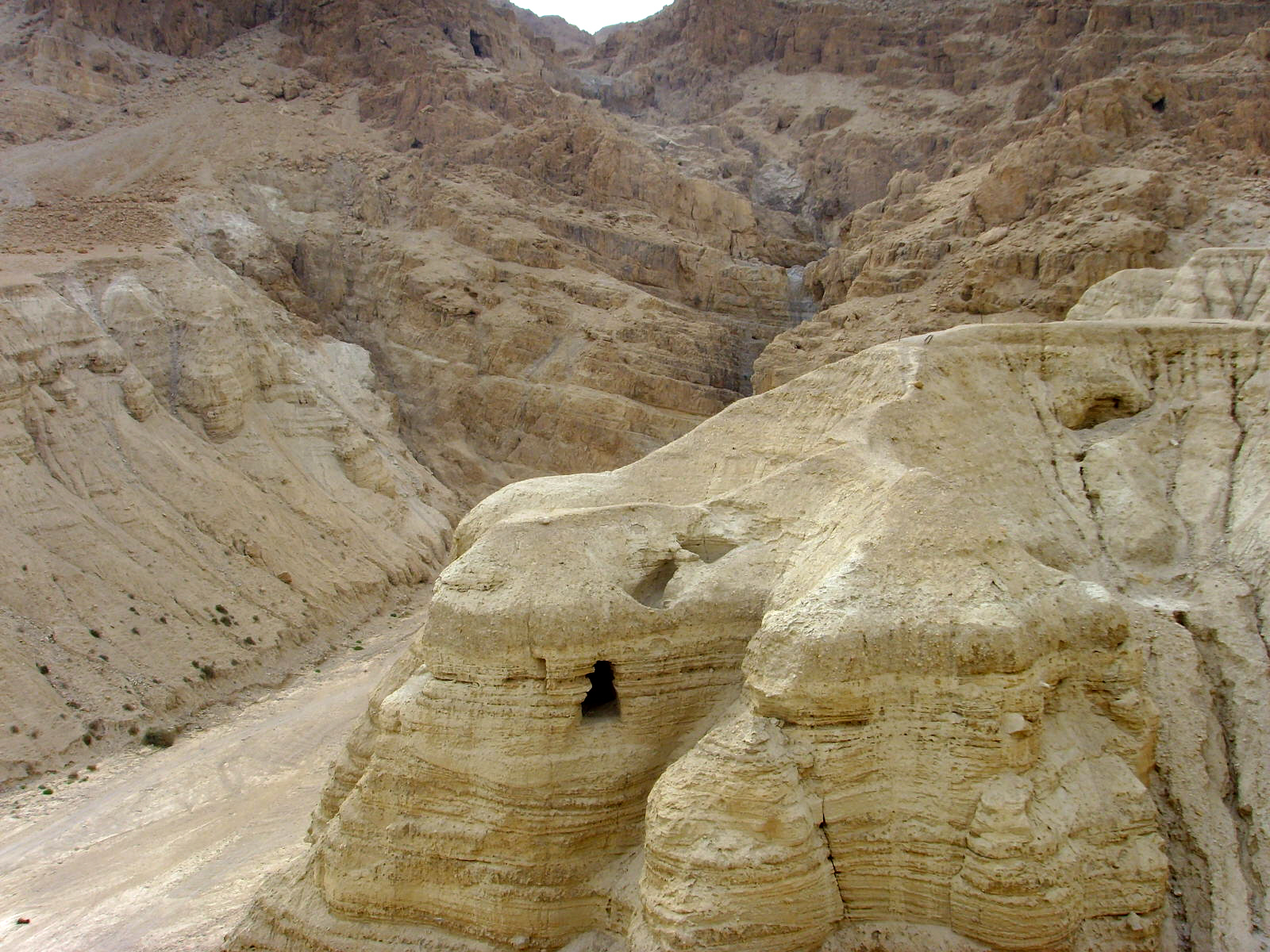
Qumran cave 4, where 90% of the Dead Sea Scrolls were found

- January – The English actor-manager Geoffrey Kendal arrives in British India with his touring repertory theatre company "Shakespeareana." It will perform William Shakespeare's works in towns and villages there for several decades.
- January 29 – Arthur Miller's play All My Sons opens at the Coronet Theater in New York, directed by Elia Kazan and starring Ed Begley, as the writer's first Broadway success.
- February 17 – On the death of Montserrat-born British fantasy fiction writer M. P. Shiel, aged 81, in Chichester, his supposed title to the Kingdom of Redonda passes to the London poet John Gawsworth.
- March – Landfall, a literary magazine, is founded by Charles Brasch and first published by Caxton Press. It will become New Zealand's longest-established literary journal.
- April
  - The opening night of the Swiss dramatist Friedrich Dürrenmatt's first play, Es steht geschrieben (It Is Written), is held in the Schauspielhaus Zürich, provoking fights among the audience.
  - The discovery of the Dead Sea Scrolls at the Qumran Caves becomes public. The initial discovery by the Bedouin shepherd Muhammed edh-Dhib, his cousin Jum'a Muhammed, and Khalil Musa took place between November 1946 and February 1947. The shepherds discovered seven scrolls housed in jars in a cave near what is now known as the Qumran site. John C. Trever reconstructed the story of the scrolls from several interviews with the Bedouins. Edh-Dhib's cousin noticed the caves, but edh-Dhib was the first to actually fall into one (the cave now called Cave 1). He retrieved a handful of scrolls, which Trever identifies as the Isaiah Scroll, the Habakkuk Commentary, and the Community Rule, and took them back to the camp to show to his family. None of the scrolls were destroyed in this process.
- April 6 – The 1st Tony Awards for excellence in live American theater are awarded at the Waldorf Astoria New York.
- April 24 – American novelist Willa Cather dies aged 73 of a cerebral hemorrhage in her home at 570 Park Avenue in Manhattan. On her death, her long-time domestic partner, magazine editor Edith Lewis, destroys the uncompleted manuscript of Cather's historical novel Hard Punishments according to the author's instructions.
- May – Dorothy Parker divorces Alan Campbell for the first time.
- May/June – The English novelist T. H. White buys a house in Saint Anne, Alderney in the Channel Islands, where he will spend the rest of his life.
- June – Publication begins of Vice Versa magazine in Los Angeles, the first known periodical for lesbians, edited by 'Lisa Ben'.
- June 24 – Kenneth Arnold claims to have seen nine flying saucers near Mount Rainier, Washington, starting a wave of enthusiasm in science fiction writers and scientists.
- June 25 – Most of The Diary of a Young Girl by Anne Frank is first published as Het Achterhuis: Dagboekbrieven 14 juni 1942 – 1 augustus 1944 ("The Annex: Diary Notes from 14 June 1942 – 1 August 1944") in Amsterdam, two years after its writer's death in Bergen-Belsen concentration camp.
- July
  - Jack Kerouac begins the journey he will later chronicle in his book On the Road.
  - Pramoedya Ananta Toer begins two years' imprisonment by the Dutch authorities in Jakarta for supporting the Indonesian National Revolution. While in prison he begins his first major novel, Perburuan (The Fugitive, 1950).
- August 24 – The first Edinburgh Festival of the Arts opens in Scotland.
- September – The German literary association Group 47 forms.
- September 12 – The American novelist John Dos Passos is involved in an automobile accident that kills his wife and costs him the sight in one eye.
- November – Muriel Spark becomes editor of Poetry Review in London from this month's issue.
- November 24 – Dalton Trumbo refuses to testify before the McCarthyite House Un-American Activities Committee. Ring Lardner, Jr. attends, but refuses to answer questions. The United States House of Representatives votes 346–17 to approve citations of Contempt of Congress against all the "Hollywood Ten" screenwriters and directors who refuse to cooperate with the Committee over allegations of communist influences in the movie business. The ten are blacklisted by the Hollywood movie studios the following day.
- December 23 – Tennessee Williams' play A Streetcar Named Desire opens at the Ethel Barrymore Theatre on Broadway in New York City, directed by Elia Kazan. It stars Jessica Tandy and Marlon Brando in his first major stage rôle.
- Uncertain dates
  - Woody Guthrie completes his novel House of Earth. It will not be published until 2013.
  - Séamus Ó Néill's novel Tonn Tuile is the first book from the Irish language publisher Sáirséal agus Dill in Dublin.

== New books ==
=== Fiction ===
- Nelson Algren – The Neon Wilderness (short stories)
- Thomas Armstrong – King Cotton
- Cynthia Asquith – This Mortal Coil
- Carolyn Sherwin Bailey – Miss Hickory
- Nigel Balchin – Lord, I Was Afraid
- H.E. Bates – The Purple Plain
- Marjorie Bowen – For Her to See
- Dorothy Bowers – The Bells at Old Bailey
- François Boyer – Les Jeux inconnus
- Ray Bradbury – Dark Carnival (debut)
- John Bude – Death Makes a Prophet
- John Horne Burns – The Gallery
- Italo Calvino – The Path to the Nest of Spiders (Il sentiero dei nidi di ragno)
- Victor Canning – The Chasm
- Albert Camus – The Plague (La Peste)
- John Dickson Carr
  - The Sleeping Sphinx
  - Dr. Fell, Detective, and Other Stories
- Peter Cheyney
  - Dance Without Music
  - Dark Interlude
- Agatha Christie – The Labours of Hercules
- J.J. Connington – Common Sense Is All You Need
- Alec Coppel – A Man About a Dog
- Thomas B. Costain – The Moneyman
- Edmund Crispin – Swan Song
- Johan Daisne – The Man Who Had His Hair Cut Short (De man die zijn haar kort liet knippen)
- Marcia Davenport – East Side, West Side
- Cecil Day-Lewis – Minute for Murder
- Hans Fallada (died February 5) – Every Man Dies Alone (Jeder stirbt für sich allein)
- Jean Genet – Querelle de Brest
- Anthony Gilbert – Death in the Wrong Room
- Jean Giono – Un Roi sans divertissement
- Winston Graham – Take My Life
- L. P. Hartley – Eustace and Hilda
- Robert A. Heinlein – Rocket Ship Galileo
- James Hilton – Nothing So Strange
- Anne Hocking – Prussian Blue
- Dorothy B. Hughes – In a Lonely Place
- Hammond Innes
  - Killer Mine
  - The Lonely Skier
- Michael Innes – A Night of Errors
- Carl Jacobi – Revelations in Black
- Yasunari Kawabata (川端 康成) – Snow Country (雪国, Yukiguni)
- Hans Keilson – Komödie in Moll (Comedy in a Minor Key)
- Arthur La Bern – Night Darkens the Streets
- Jacques Laurent – Darling Caroline
- Fritz Leiber, Jr. – Night's Black Agents
- Alexander Lernet-Holenia – Twentieth of July
- E. C. R. Lorac – Relative to Poison
- Malcolm Lowry – Under the Volcano
- Edgar Lustgarten – A Case to Answer
- Thomas Mann – Doctor Faustus (Doktor Faustus: Das Leben des deutschen Tonsetzers Adrian Leverkühn, erzählt von einem Freunde)
- Gabriel García Márquez – Eyes of a Blue Dog (Ojos de perro azul)
- Ngaio Marsh – Final Curtain
- W. Somerset Maugham – Creatures of Circumstance (short stories)
- Oscar Micheaux – Masquerade, a Historical Novel
- James A. Michener – Tales of the South Pacific
- Gladys Mitchell – Death and the Maiden
- W. O. Mitchell – Who Has Seen the Wind?
- Alberto Moravia – The Woman of Rome (La Romana)
- Willard Motley – Knock On Any Door
- Vladimir Nabokov – Bend Sinister
- Mollie Panter-Downes – One Fine Day
- Cesare Pavese – Il compagno
- Gerard Reve (as Simon van het Reve) – De Avonden (The Evenings)
- Kenneth Roberts – Lydia Bailey
- Michael Sadleir – Forlorn Sunset
- Samuel Shellabarger – Prince of Foxes
- Mickey Spillane – I, the Jury
- John Steinbeck
  - The Pearl
  - The Wayward Bus
- Rex Stout – Too Many Women
- Cecil Street
  - Death of an Author
  - Nothing But the Truth
- Julian Symons – A Man Called Jones
- Phoebe Atwood Taylor (as Alice Tilton) – The Iron Clew
- Philip Toynbee – Tea with Mrs Goodman
- Boris Vian
  - Autumn in Peking (L'Automne à Pékin)
  - Froth on the Daydream (L'Écume des jours)
  - (as Vernon Sullivan) – The Dead All Have the Same Skin (Les Morts ont tous la même peau)
- Evelyn Waugh – Scott-King's Modern Europe
- Jack Williamson – With Folded Hands
- Cornell Woolrich - Waltz Into Darkness
- Frank Yerby – The Vixens

=== Children and young people ===
- Dora Birtles – Pioneer Shack
- William Pène du Bois – The Twenty-One Balloons
- Margaret Wise Brown – Goodnight Moon
- Edgar Rice Burroughs – Tarzan and the Foreign Legion
- Nan Chauncy – They Found a Cave
- Rumer Godden – The Doll's House
- Clare Hoskyns-Abrahall – Prelude (biography)
- James Lennox Kerr (as Peter Dawlish) – Dauntless Finds Her Crew (first in the Dauntless series of at least eight books)
- Betty MacDonald – Mrs. Piggle-Wiggle (first in a series of four books)
- Walter de la Mare – Collected Stories for Children
- Laurence Meynell (as A. Stephen Tring) – The Old Gang
- Arthur Ransome – Great Northern?
- Frank Richards – Billy Bunter of Greyfriars School
- Charles Green Shaw – It Looked Like Spilt Milk

=== Drama ===
- Jean Anouilh – Invitation to the Castle (L'Invitation au Château)
- Pralhad Keshav Atre – Moruchi Mavshi (adaptation of Charley's Aunt)
- Ugo Betti – Ispezione (The Inquiry)
- Wolfgang Borchert – The Man Outside (Draußen vor der Tür)
- Maurice Clavel – Les Incendiaires
- William Douglas-Home
  - The Chiltern Hundreds
  - Now Barabbas
- Jean Genet – The Maids (Les Bonnes)
- Patrick Hastings – The Blind Goddess
- Ian Hay
  - Hattie Stowe
  - Off the Record
- Michael Clayton Hutton – Power Without Glory
- Geoffrey Kerr – The Man in the Street
- Noel Langley and Robert Morley – Edward, My Son
- Arthur Miller – All My Sons
- Ena Lamont Stewart – Men Should Weep
- Ben Travers – Outrageous Fortune
- John Van Druten – The Druid Circle
- A.R. Whatmore – She Wanted a Cream Front Door
- Tennessee Williams – A Streetcar Named Desire

=== Poetry ===
- Kingsley Amis – Bright November
- Cairo poets, edited by Keith Bullen and John Cromer – Salamander: A Miscellany of Poetry
- Aimé Césaire – Cahier d'un retour au pays natal (Notebook of a Return to the Native Land; expanded in book format)
- August Derleth (editor) – Dark of the Moon: Poems of Fantasy and the Macabre
- Abba Kovner – Ad Lo-Or (Until No-Light)
- Philip Larkin – A Girl in Winter
- Louis MacNeice – The Dark Tower
- Shinoe Shōda (正田 篠枝) – Sange

=== Non-fiction ===
- Simone de Beauvoir – The Ethics of Ambiguity (Pour une Morale de l'ambiguïté)
- Cleanth Brooks – The Well Wrought Urn: Studies in the Structure of Poetry
- L. Sprague de Camp – The Evolution of Naval Weapons
- Bernard DeVoto – Across the Wide Missouri
- Benjamin Fondane (posthumous) – Baudelaire et l'expérience du gouffre
- Anne Frank (posthumous) – The Diary of a Young Girl
- George Gamow – One Two Three... Infinity
- Jacquetta Hawkes and Christopher Hawkes – Prehistoric Britain
- Primo Levi – If This Is a Man (Se questo è un uomo)
- Walter Lippmann – The Cold War
- George Orwell – Lear, Tolstoy and the Fool
- Nicolae Petrescu-Comnen – Preludi del grande dramma
- Samuel Putnam – Paris Was Our Mistress: Memoirs of a Lost & Found Generation
- Franz Rosenthal – The Technique and Approach of Muslim Scholarship
- Hugh Trevor-Roper – The Last Days of Hitler
- A. L. Zissu – Nu există cult mozaic (No Such Thing as a Mosaic Religion)

== Births ==
- January 14 – Richard Laymon, American suspense novelist (died 2001)
- February 3 – Paul Auster, American novelist (died 2024)
- February 9 – Eamon Duffy, Irish church historian and academic
- March 22 – James Patterson, American novelist and short story writer
- April 3 – Srikrishna Alanahalli, Indian novelist and poet (died 1989)
- April 12 – Tom Clancy, American novelist (died 2013)
- April 18 – Kathy Acker (Karen Lehmann), American novelist and poet (died 1997)
- April 27 – Astrid Roemer, Suriname-born Dutch novelist, poet and playwright (died 2026)
- April 28 – Humayun Azad, Bangladeshi author, poet, scholar and linguist (died 2004)
- May 10 – Thomas Tessier, American writer of horror novels and short stories
- May 12 – Catherine Yronwode, American author and illustrator
- May 27 – Felix Dennis, English publisher and poet (died 2014)
- June 5 – David Hare, English playwright
- June 19 – Salman Rushdie, Indian novelist writing in English
- June 22 – Octavia E. Butler, American science fiction writer (died 2006)
- July 2 – Jürg Amann, Swiss dramatist (died 2013)
- July 18 – Dermot Healy, Irish novelist and poet (died 2014)
- July 23 – Gardner Dozois, American science fiction author and editor (died 2018)
- August 14 - Danielle Steel, American romance novelist
- August 23 – Willy Russell, English dramatist
- September 8 – Marianne Wiggins, American novelist
- September 21 – Stephen King, American novelist
- October 14 – Tomás de Mattos, Uruguayan writer and librarian (died 2016)
- October 19 – Giorgio Cavazzano, Italian comics artist and illustrator
- October 26 – Trevor Joyce, Irish poet
- November 6 – Michelle Magorian, English children's author
- November 14 – P. J. O'Rourke, American political satirist and journalist (died 2022)
- November 28 – Gustav Hasford, American marine, novelist, journalist, poet and book thief (died 1993)
- December 4 – Ursula Krechel, German writer and poet
- December 26 – Jean Echenoz, French novelist
- unknown dates
  - Michael Burkard, American poet and educator (died 2024)
  - Jaume Cabré, Catalan Spanish novelist and screenwriter
  - Shahid Nadeem, Pakistani playwright
  - Borka Pavićević, Montenegrin dramatist and columnist (died 2019)

== Deaths ==
- January 19 – Manuel Machado, Spanish poet (born 1874)
- February 1 – J. D. Beresford, English short-story writer (born 1873)
- February 4 – Margaret Cameron, American novelist, humorist, playwright, non-fiction writer (born 1867)
- February 5 – Hans Fallada, German novelist (born 1893)
- February 11 – E. M. Hull, English romance novelist (born 1880)
- February 15 – Margaret Marshall Saunders, Canadian author (born 1861)
- March 12 – Winston Churchill, American novelist (born 1871)
- March 13 – Angela Brazil, English school-story writer for girls (born 1868)
- April 24 – Willa Cather, American novelist (born 1873)
- April 30 – Anna Wickham (Edith Alice Mary Harper), English poet (suicide, born 1883)
- May 21
  - Flora Thompson, English semi-autobiographical novelist (born 1876)
  - E. C. Vivian (Charles Henry Cannell), English genre novelist (born 1882)
- June 6 – James Agate, English author and critic (born 1877)
- June 17 – Maxwell Perkins, American literary editor (born 1884)
- August 5 – Herbert Asquith, English poet and novelist (born 1881)
- August 30 – Jessie Wilson Manning, American author and lecturer (born 1855)
- September 25 – Afevork Ghevre Jesus, Ethiopian author writing in Amharic (born 1868)
- September 26 – Hugh Lofting, English-born children's writer (born 1886)
- September 15 – Richard Le Gallienne, English writer and poet (born 1866)
- October 1 – Gregorio Martínez Sierra, Spanish playwright (born 1881)
- October 13
  - William Le Queux, English-born French novelist and writer (born 1864)
  - Sidney Webb, English political economist (born 1859)
- November 12 – Baroness Orczy (Emma Orczy), Hungarian novelist writing in English (born 1865)
- November 14 – Marie Adelaide Belloc Lowndes, Anglo-French novelist and biographer writing in English (born 1868)
- November 20 – Wolfgang Borchert, German author and playwright (liver failure, born 1921)
- December 7 – Tristan Bernard, French playwright and novelist (born 1866)
- December 15 – Arthur Machen, Welsh journalist, novelist and short-story writer (born 1863)
- December 30 – Alfred North Whitehead, English mathematician and philosopher (born 1861)

== Awards ==
- Carnegie Medal for children's literature: Walter de la Mare, Collected Stories for Children
- Frost Medal: Gustav Davidson
- James Tait Black Memorial Prize for fiction: L. P. Hartley, Eustace and Hilda
- James Tait Black Memorial Prize for biography: Rev. C. C. E. Raven, English Naturalists from Neckham to Ray
- Knight Bachelor: Ralph Richardson
- Newbery Medal for children's literature: Carolyn Sherwin Bailey, Miss Hickory
- Nobel Prize in Literature: André Gide
- Premio Nadal: Miguel Delibes, La sombra del ciprés es alargada
- Pulitzer Prize for Drama: no award given
- Pulitzer Prize for Poetry: Robert Lowell: Lord Weary's Castle
- Pulitzer Prize for the Novel: Robert Penn Warren – All the King's Men
