= List of Harlequin Romance novels released in 1956 =

This is a list of Harlequin Romance novels released in 1956. (Main index: List of Harlequin Romance novels)

Cheval aquin

Aimer électrique

Robot 2025 aleja

Tourisme et marriage

La langue jeune

== Releases ==
Number	Title	Author	Date	Citations
# 348	The Doctor On Elm Street	Kay Hamilton	1956	
# 349	The Four Just Men	Edgar Wallace	1956	
# 350	The Renegade	Walt Coburn	1956	
# 351	Dr. Parrish, Resident	Sydney Thompson	1956	
# 352	The India-Rubber Men	Edgar Wallace	1956	
# 353	Gun Law	Paul Evan Lehman	1956 (Note: Reprint)	
# 354	Dark Bahama	Peter Cheyney	1956	
# 355	Savage Justice	Leslie Ernenwein	1956 (Note: Reprint)	
# 356	Nurse's Aide	Lucy Agnes Hancock	1956	
# 357	Young Doctor Glenn	Kay Hamilton	1956	
# 358	Redrock Gold	Paul Evan Lehman	1956	
# 359	The Secret Adversary	Agatha Christie	1956	
# 360	Yucca City Outlaw	William Hopson	1956 (Note: Reprint)	
# 361	Clue Of The Silver Key	Edgar Wallace	1956	
# 362	Nora Was A Nurse	Peggy Dern	1956	
# 363	Doctor Alice's Daughter	Kay Hamilton	1956	
# 364	Surgeon In Charge	Elizabeth Seifert	1956	
# 365	Doctors Are Different	Dorothy Pierce Walker	1956	
# 366	The Brass Monkey	Harry Whittington	1956	
# 367	Hickory House	Kenneth Orvis	1956	
# 368	Meredith Blake, M.D.	Peggy Gaddis	1956	
# 369	Three Doctors	Elizabeth Seifert	1956	
# 370	Appointment With Venus	Jerrard Tickell	1956	
# 371	Renegade Ramrod	Leslie Ernenwein	1956	
# 372	Meet The Warrens	Lucy Agnes Hancock	1956	
# 373	Tonight, Josephine!	Lozania Prole	1956	
# 374	Valley Of The Sun	Archie Joscelyn	1956	
# 375	Miss Doctor	Elizabeth Seifert	1956	
