= This Man Is Dangerous =

This Man Is Dangerous may refer to:

- This Man Is Dangerous (1941 film), a British thriller film
- This Man Is Dangerous (1953 film), a French thriller film based on the novel
- This Man Is Dangerous (novel), a 1936 novel by Peter Cheyney
