= The Dark Street =

1944 novel

- First edition
- Author: Peter Cheyney
- Language: English
- Genre: Spy Thriller
- Publisher: William Collins, Sons (UK); Dodd, Mead (US)
- Publication date: 1944
- Publication place: United Kingdom
- Media type: Print
- Pages: 192
- Preceded by: The Stars Are Dark

The Dark Street is a 1944 thriller novel by the British writer Peter Cheyney. It was published in the United States by Dodd, Mead with the alternative title of The Dark Street Murders. It follows on from both the 1942 novel Dark Duet and the 1943 novel The Stars Are Dark and features his recurring head of British counter intelligence Quale as well as the spy Shaun O'Mara. It begins in wartime occupied Paris before moving to London.

== Bibliography ==
- Panek, LeRoy. The Special Branch: The British Spy Novel, 1890-1980. Popular Press, 1981.
- Reilly, John M. Twentieth Century Crime & Mystery Writers. Springer, 2015.
