= Matematika zločinu =

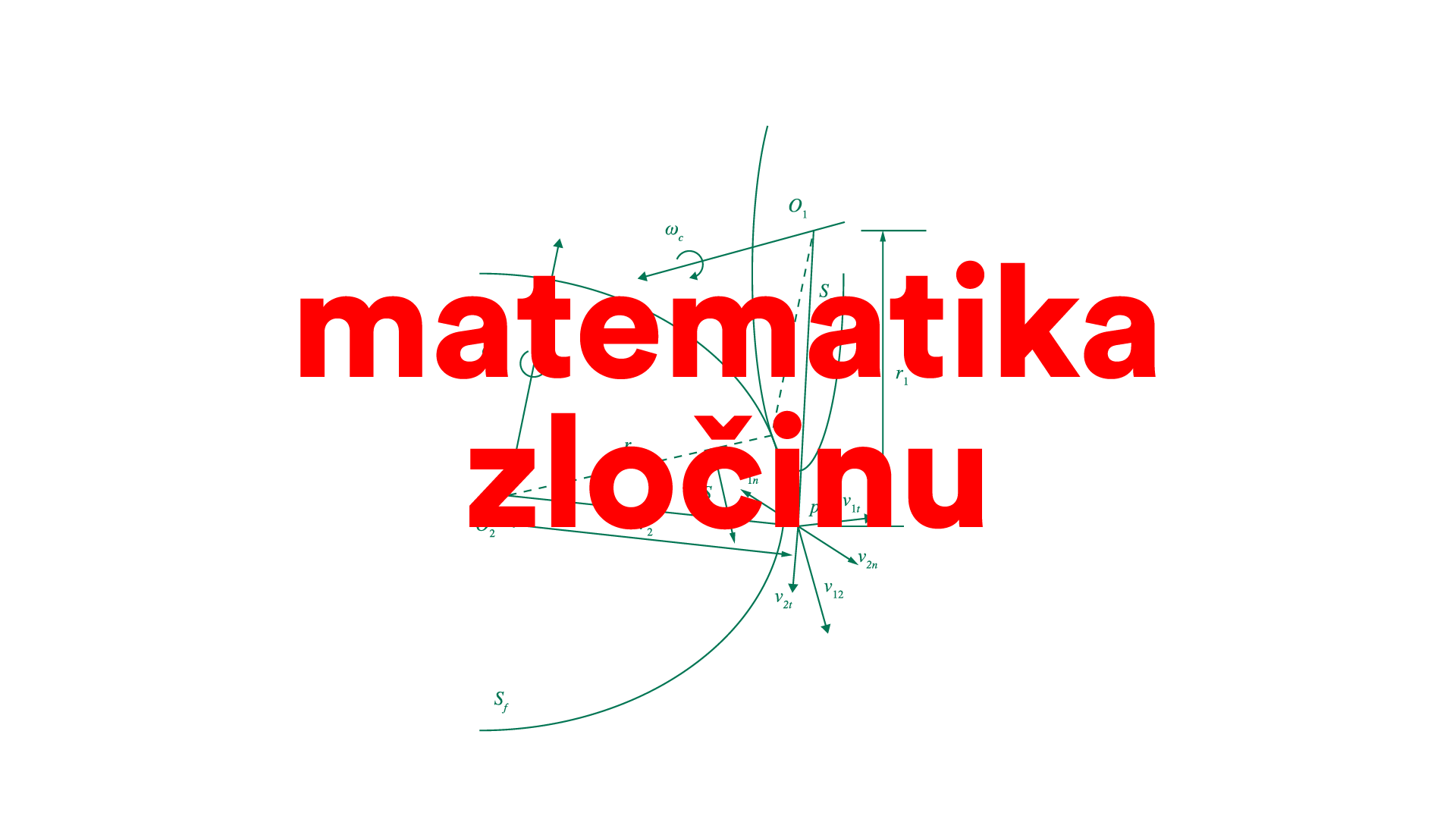
- Genre: Crime Drama
- Written by: Tomáš Bombík
- Directed by: Peter Bebjak
- Starring: Jan Nedbal; Lucie Štěpánková; Zuzana Bydžovská; Jiří Bartoška
- Country of origin: Czech Republic
- Original language: Czech
- No. of seasons: 1
- No. of episodes: 3

Production
- Running time: 60 minutes

Original release
- Network: Voyo
- Release: July 28 – August 11, 2023

Matematika zločinu (English: Mathematics of Crime) is a 2023 three-part film miniseries directed by Peter Bebjak and produced by D.N.A Production for Voyo. It was written by Tomáš Bombík. The series was filmed under the Voyo Original brand.

== Plot ==
The series is inspired by a real event and by a podcast of the same name. by investigative reporter Magdalena Sodomková and documentarian Brit Jensen.

Journalist Sodomková is contacted by prisoner Tomáš Toman from Indonesian prison. He was arrested as a fugitive from justice as he was convicted of killing one man. However, he claims that he did not commit the crime for which he has served 12.5 years. According to him, he was sent to prison by a questionable opinion of a forensic expert Kraus who is nicknamed the Mathematician of Crime. Journalist Sodomková gradually gets into Toman's case and discovers that many things are not right. The question remains whether she can believe Toman's version of events, especially given that he has been punished for similar activity in the past.

== Cast ==
- Lucie Štěpánková as Magdalena Sodomková
- Jan Nedbal as Tomáš Toman
- Zuzana Bydžovská as Toman's mother
- Kristýna Boková as Toman's sister
- Miloslav Pecháček as Čára
- Jiří Bartoška as Kraus
- Tomáš Maštalír as defense attorney Mareš
- Barbora Bočková as Brit Jensen
- Kryštof Bartoš as defense attorney Strouhal

== Episodes ==
No.	Title	Directed by	Written by	Original release date	Czech viewers (millions)
1	"Vězení"	Peter Bebjak	Tomáš Bombík	July 28, 2023	N/A
2	"Soudy"	Peter Bebjak	Tomáš Bombík	August 4, 2023	N/A
3	"Ústavní soud a osvobození"	Peter Bebjak	Tomáš Bombík	August 11, 2023	N/A

== Reception ==
Matematika zločinu won Czech Lion Award for Best Television Film or Miniseries becoming the first project by TV Nova to win Czech Lion.
