= Dalma Špitzerová =

Slovak actress (1925–2021)

- Špitzerová in 1945
- Born: Dalma Holanová; February 5, 1925; Piešťany, Czechoslovakia (now Slovakia)
- Died: January 21, 2021 (aged 95)
- Resting place: Orthodox Jewish Cemetery, Bratislava
- Education: Drama Academy, Bratislava
- Occupations: Actress; acting teacher
- Years active: 1940s–1970s (stage); 1990s– (teaching)
- Known for: Holocaust survival; joining the Slovak National Uprising; acting in the Tatra Revue cabaret
- Spouse: Juraj Špitzer
- Children: Zuzana Szatmáry
- Relatives: Michael Szatmary (grandchild)
- Awards: Order of Ľudovít Štúr 2nd class (2016), Memory of Nations Award (Slovakia, 2019)

Dalma Špitzerová (née Holanová; 5 February 1925 – 21 January 2021) was a Jewish Slovak actor and acting teacher. She grew up in Liptovský Mikuláš. In 1942, at the age of 16, she fled to Hungary seeking refuge from deportation to concentration camps. When she was caught in Hungary, she was sent to Nováky Assembly Camp, where she developed a passion for theatre and acting. Following the end of World War II, Špitzerová went onto become an actress in multiple theatres in Slovakia. Špitzerová was also the Slovakia winner of the 2019 Memory of Nations Awards.

== Childhood ==
Špitzerová was born on 5 February 1925 in Piešťany, Czechoslovakia (now Slovakia). She spent her whole childhood in Liptovský Mikuláš with her father, mother, and four siblings. Her father worked as a Hazzan in different synagogues, and her mother taught French and German. In 1942, her father was concerned that the family would be deported to a concentration or work camp, so he arranged for Špitzerová and her two older sisters to go to Hungary.

== Escape to Hungary ==
Špitzerová's two older sisters left ahead of her to go to Hungary. Špitzerová crossed the border to Rožňava where she had relatives. Her aunt provided money to purchase a first-class train ticket to Budapest. When she arrived in Budapest, she was able to reconnect with her sisters.

Shortly after they arrived, her sisters were caught by Hungarian Dalmatian Gendarmes. Špitzerová turned herself in following her sisters' capture. Her sisters were sent to Auschwitz concentration camp, but Špitzerová was temporarily put in a local prison in Uzhhorod and later deported to a camp in Slovakia.

== Nováky Assembly Camp ==
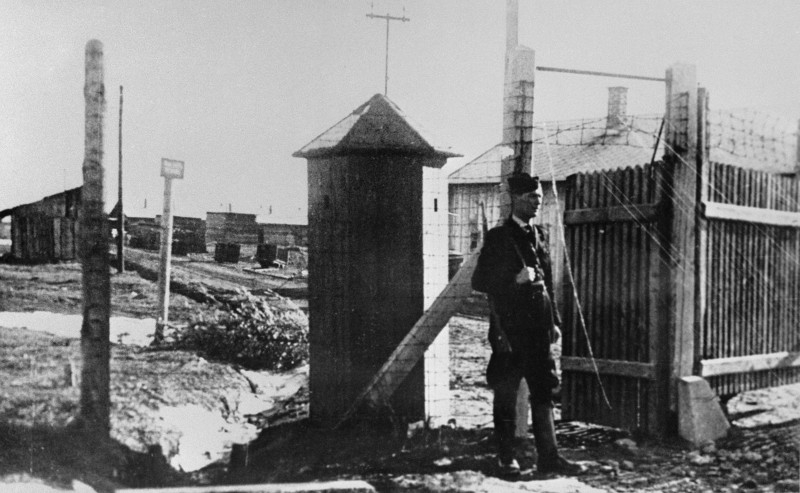
The Nováky assembly camp in 1941

Špitzerová was in the Nováky Assembly Camp for two years. She worked as a seamstress in one of the workshops making backpacks. From March to October 1942, the camps in Slovakia exported around 5,600 people to concentration camps in Poland. Špitzerová was never transported to a camp in Poland because a Czech architect was in charge of the work camp and informed the German soldiers that he needed the labor. They sewed backpacks for 10 hours a day and were given limited food.

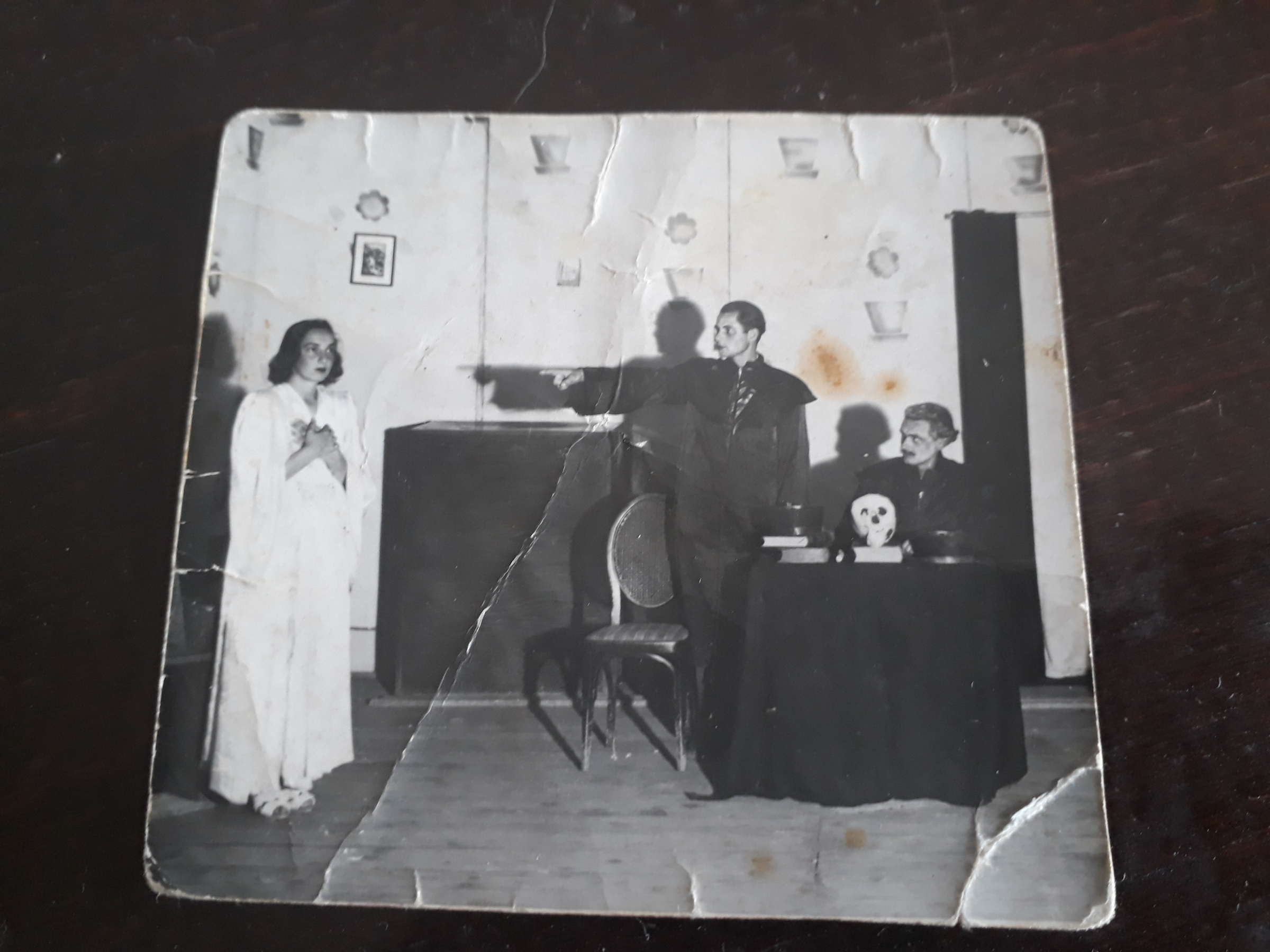
Dalma Špitzerová in Karel Čapek's The Makropulos Affair at the Nováky assembly camp in 1942.

In the prisoners' free time they would perform plays on Saturday and Sunday evenings. There was a director in the camp that was from Hungary and he would help put the plays on. Špitzerová described the performances in the camp, saying, "We were in the shadow of death every day in the camp. We did not know what awaited us, whether they would send us somewhere or not. We fell asleep every night feeling we did not know if we would survive the next day. That is why we started playing theatre. My fellow prisoners told me that I had talent and that if the world returned to normal, let me try to be an actress. It kept me alive. It was something that helped me, so as not to go crazy." The first play that she performed in was The Makropulos Affair by Karel Čapek. Even though the director was hesitant to give her the part, she played Emilia Marty. The director found her very talented, along with everyone else in the camp.

During her time at the camp, Špitzerová became involved in the underground Slovak National uprising movement. Her future husband, Juraj Špitzer, was a famous journalist and the leader of the uprising. She had known him as a child but was not romantically involved with him until meeting him again in the 3rd barracks of the camp. Špitzer used to sneak out of the camp at night with a group of people and smuggle in weapons that they had been given from Soviet guerillas. In August 1944, the uprising against the guards began, but Špitzer would not let Špitzerová be a part of it because she was a woman. Once she escaped from the camp following the start of the uprising, she became involved in the movement.

== Role in the Slovak National Uprising ==
When Špitzerová got out of Nováky Assembly Camp she went to Banská Bystrica where she joined the resistance. She served as a secretariat and was sent to Ľupča Castle. After that, she moved to the press department of the partisan movement where she was in charge of photo documentation. When they were pushed into the mountain Prašivá by the German forces, she moved with them.

When she was done working as a Guerilla, she had to go into hiding. She changed her name to Marta Stanková during that time and lived with a woman in Paludzka where she worked in a pub. The towns people, knew who she was because she had grown up nearby, but they did not turn her in.

One week before the end of the war, her parents and two younger siblings were being led to the Soviet front of the war to safety, but a family friend turned them in to the Nazis. They were killed with almost 50 other people.

== Life following the war ==
After the war, Špitzerová moved to Bratislava.

When she made it to the capital of Slovakia, she was reunited with her two older sisters who had survived Auschwitz and the death march. She unsuccessfully attempted to find Juraj Špitzer, whose entire family had been killed during the war.

Following the war, Špitzerová graduated from the Drama Academy. The first theatre she worked in was the Martin Chamber Theatre, then she worked at the New Scene. The last theatre she worked at was the famous Tatra Revue as an actress, singer, and dancer in the 1960s. She worked with František Dibarbora at the Nová Scéna and with Milan Lasica at the Tatra Revue. In the early 1970s, the Tatra Revue was shut down by the Communists.

In the late 1960s, Špitzerová was approached by the former Minister of the Interior of the Wartime State, Alexander Mach. He had been let go in May 1968. Mach had read Špitzer's articles in Cultural Life and wanted a meeting with him. At this point, Špitzerová was back together with Špitzer and helped Mach set up a meeting with him. Špitzer and Mach released a conversation that showed two people that were enemies and had different views talking things out.

== Life during and after communism ==
After the normalization period in 1968, Špitzerová was not able to act. Her husband was not able to work as a journalist either due to government censorship.

She worked packing books at a wholesale place before obtaining a job as a direction assistant for Slovak Television. She worked for Slovak Television for 11 years until was then fired without cause. Špitzerová never joined the Communist party.

In the early 1990s, after the fall of Communism, Špitzerová started her own private acting studio. She used the experience she had gained to teach people how to act. She had many actors and actresses go on to become successful, including Tatiana Pauhofová. Špitzerová said about herself, "It probably helped me in my life that I had a strong will and I never stopped believing that the bad one would go away one day".

== Awards and recognitions ==
Špitzerová has received multiple awards and recognitions over the past 30 years. In the 1990s, she received a 1st place international prize for her private acting studio that she started. In January 2016, she received the highest state distinction from Slovak President Andrej Kiska. She was also featured in the 2017 documentary Zachor ('remember' in Hebrew) that uses testimony from five ex-prisoners of Nováky Assembly Camp.

Špitzerová's most recent honor was being recognized as the 2019 Slovak winner of the Memory of Nations Awards in Prague, Czech Republic. The 2019 awards honored a citizen in the Czech Republic, Slovakia, Poland, Hungary, and Germany that had shown bravery standing up to the totalitarian regimes in their individual countries.
