= Dark Interlude =

Dark Interlude may refer to:

- Dark Interlude (Timms novel), a 1939 mystery novel by the Australian writer E. V. Timms
- Dark Interlude (Cheyney novel), a 1947 spy thriller novel by the British writer Peter Cheyney
