= Filmzauber =

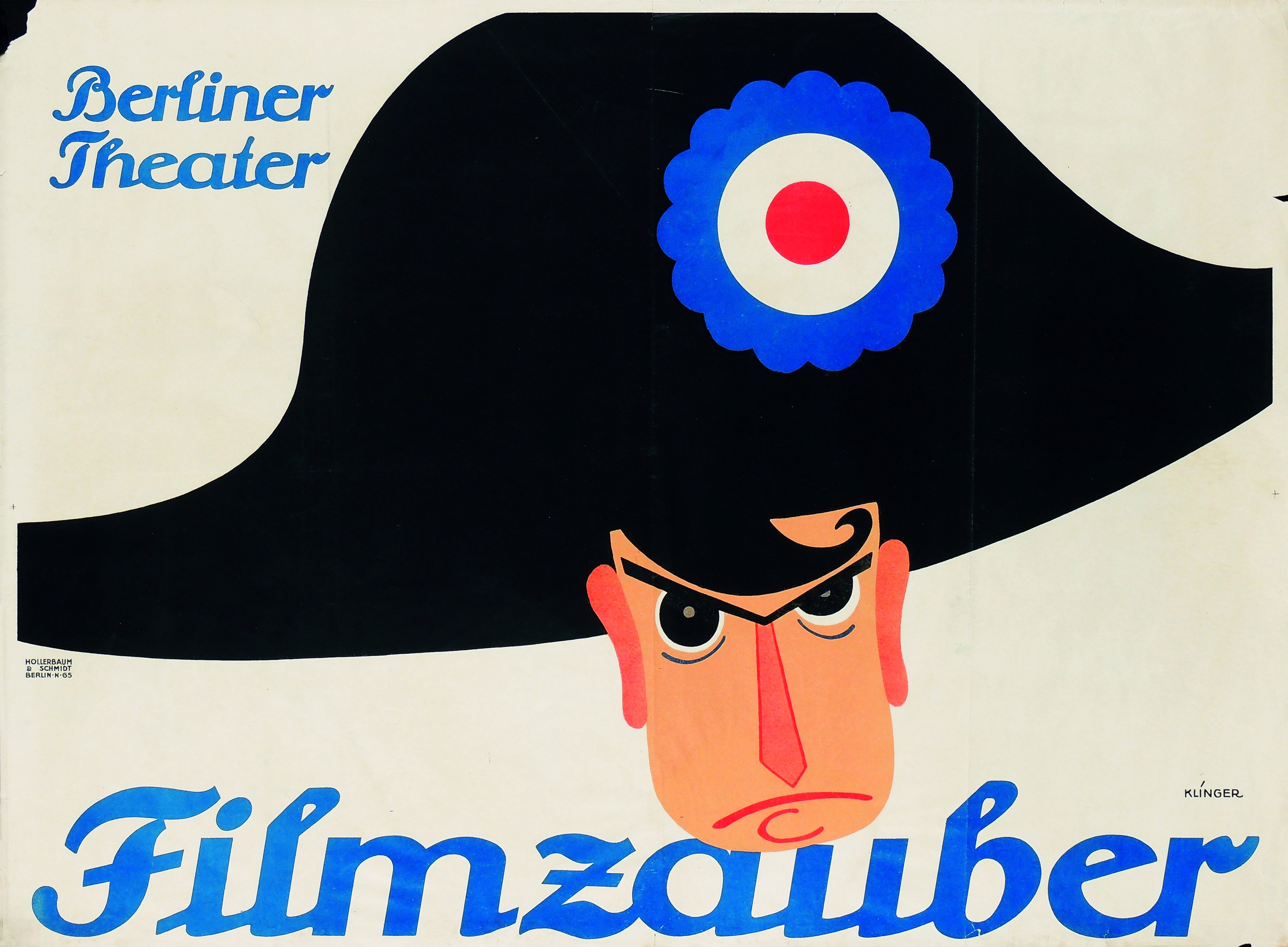
Filmzauber poster by Julius Klinger, 1914, Poster Museum at Wilanów

Filmzauber, literally 'Film Magic', is a Posse mit Gesang (a kind of popular musical drama) in four scenes by Walter Kollo and Willy Bredschneider, with a German libretto by Rudolf Bernauer and Rudolph Schanzer. A parody of (then popular) silent films, Filmzauber premiered in Berlin in 1912. An English version, The Girl on the Film, translated and adapted by James T. Tanner with additional music by Albert Szirmai, premiered in London in 1913 and was later performed in New York and elsewhere.

== Performance history ==
Filmzauber was first performed at the Berliner Theater, Berlin on 19 October 1912 with Lisa Weise, and the celebrated Austrian singer and later film actor, Oscar Sabo.

It was revived (with an updated text) at the Heimathafen Neukölln Berlin on 18 April 2009, directed by Stefanie Aehnelt and conducted by Bruno Franceschini.

== Main roles ==
- Adalbert Musenfett, film producer and actor
- Maria Gesticulata, Italian tragedienne
- Fränze Papendieck, Musenfett's admirer
- Privy Councillor Papendieck, father of Fränze and film censor
- Wanda Hammerschmidt, Musenfett's office manager
- Max Rademacher, Wanda's admirer
- August Käsebier, Wanda's uncle and guardian in Knötteritz, a Reichstag representative
- Klemczinsky

== Synopsis ==
Set in Berlin and 'Knötteritz near Leipzig' circa 1912. A farce, with several subplots, centering on the efforts by the idolized silent film producer-actor Adalbert Musenfett to cast himself as Napoleon in a drama set during the Battle of Leipzig. Maria Gesticulata, an Italian tragedienne, is lined up to play his love interest, the pretty Knötteritz tobacco-miller's daughter.

== Musical numbers ==
Cover of the sheet music from Filmzauber arranged for voice and piano

- 1. Introduction 'Lasset uns schreiben ohne Verweilen' [Bredschneider]
- 2. Song 'Es war einmal ein Gymnasiast' [Bredschneider]
- 3. Song 'Fränze, was machst du bloss für Tänze' [Bredschneider]
- 4. March-duet 'Untern Linden' [Kollo]
- 5. Introduction 'Hoch unser neuer M. d. R.' [Bredschneider]
- 6. 'Das Lied von der Mühle' [Bredschneider]
- 7. March-Quodlibet (from an old melody) [Bredschneider]
- 8. Duet 'Machen wir zusammen eine Firma auf' [Kollo]
- 9. Duet 'Kind, ich schlafe so schlecht' [Kollo]
- 10. Melodramatic finale [Bredschneider]
- 11 Introduction [Bredschneider]
- 12. Chanson 'Das Sahnenbaiser' [Bredschneider]
- 13. Terzett 'Erst 'ne Weile rechts' [Kollo]
- 14. Walz-duet 'Hab'n wir uns nicht schon mal kenn'n gelernt?' [Kollo]
- 15. Couplet 's war ooch ganz scheen' [Bredschneider]
- 16. Reminiscence ('Kind, ich schlafe so schlecht') [Kollo]
- 17. Finale song ('Erst 'ne Weile rechts') [Kollo]

== Recordings ==
The march 'Unter'n Linden, Unter'n Linden gehen spaziern die Mägdelein' (describing Berlin's famous thoroughfare, Unter den Linden) has become one of the songs representing the capital. It has been recorded by a number of singers including Marlene Dietrich (Marlene Dietrich's Berlin, Capitol Records LP ST 10443 and Marlene Dietrich singt Alt-Berliner Lieder LP AMIGA 8 45 009) and Hermann Prey (Ich sing mein schonstes Lied (vocal recital), Capriccio CD C10289).

The popular song 'Kind, ich schlafe so schlecht' ('Child, I slept so badly') was recorded on 78 with the tenor Max Kuttner and the soprano 'Lucie Bernardo' (Johanna Sandfuchs), and also more recently by Kollo's grandson René Kollo (on René Kollo sings Kollo, 2009, CD EMI).

== The Girl on the Film ==
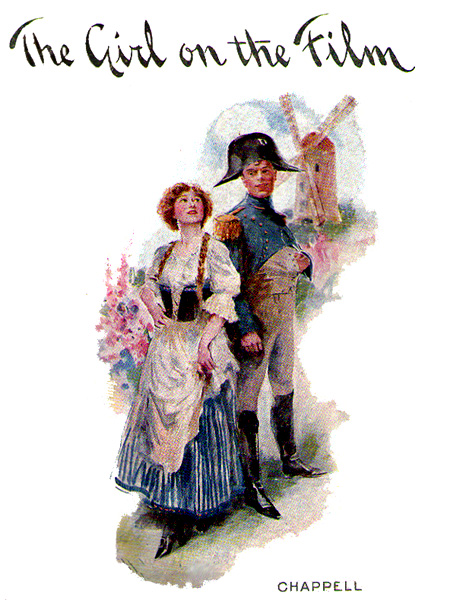
Cover of 1913 vocal score

Wehlen and Grossmith in the London production of The Girl on the Film

A three-act English operetta adaptation, given the title The Girl on the Film, was made by James T. Tanner with additional music by Albert Szirmai and English lyrics by Adrian Ross. It was produced by George Edwardes and opened at the Gaiety Theatre in London on April 5, 1913, until 5 December, running for 232 performances, when the production transferred to New York. The production starred George Grossmith Jr. as Max Daly, Emmy Wehlen as Winifred and Connie Ediss as Euphemia Knox.

The production transferred to the 44th Street Theatre in New York City and ran from 29 December 1913 to 31 February 1914, a total of 64 performances. This was the first musical at that theatre, and the production was considered a modest success. J. C. Williamson's opera company toured The Girl on the Film in Australasia in 1915.

=== Roles and London/New York casts ===
The casts in London and New York were as follows (some of the people in the New York casts were also replacements in London):

- Mrs. Clutterbuch – Irene Verona (Hattie Arnold in New York)
- Portia – Florence Reade (Gertie Birch in New York)
- Euphemia Knox – Connie Ediss
- Max Daly – George Grossmith Jr.
- Cornelius Clutterbuch – George Barrett (John McArdle in New York)
- Valentine Twiss – Charles Maude (Paul Plunkett in New York)
- Signora Maria Gesticulata – Gwendoline Brogden (Mary Rodson in New York)
- Tom Brown – William Stephens (Milbury Ryder in New York)
- Linda – Madeleine Seymour
- Olivia – Gladys Wray (Vere Sinclair in New York)
- Viola – Blanche Stocker
- General Fitzgibbon, V.C. – Grafton Williams (Percy Terriss in New York)
- Winifred – Emmy Wehlen
- Lord Ronny – Arthur Wellesley
- Sergeant Tozer – Reginald Crompton (John Western in New York)
- Daudet "Doddie" – Robert Nainby (Grafton Williams)
- Lady Porchester – Violet Wilson
- Macawber – Edward Cutler

Dancers: Dorma Leigh and Oy-ra

=== Synopsis ===
A cinema actor and producer, Max Daly, is much sought after by the ladies. Pretty Winifred, the daughter of gruff General Fitzgibbon, in order to be near him, runs away from home and dresses as a boy (Freddy) to obtain a part in one of Max's films. Max plays Napoleon during a French invasion. But Signora Maria Gesticulata (Gwendoline Brogden) has come from Italy to play a part in the same film, and Max falls in love with her. He cannot speak Italian, and she cannot speak English, so Winifred acts as interpreter. In translating a love-letter from Max to the Signora, Winifred words it so as to offend the lady, who resigns her part at once. Winifred, still supposed to be a boy, then plays the Signora's part, and Max does not discover the fact that she is a girl until after the film has been shown at an Army League soiree.

=== Musical numbers (Broadway production) ===
Act 1

- Correspondence – Linda and Chorus
- I Heard That Tale Before – Linda and Valentine Twiss
- You Don't See It But It's There – Euphemia Knox and Winifred
- In Bond Street – Winifred and Max Daly

Act 2

- On the Ground – Euphemia
- Song of the Mill – Linda (music by Szirmai)
- Down By the Country Side – Max and Chorus
- Won't You Come and Waltz with Me – Linda and Valentine (music by Szirmai)
- Ah! Che Vedo – Maria Gesticulata and Max
- Oh! If You Were a Girl – Winifred and Max

Act 3

- Tommy Won't You Teach Me How to Tango – Max and Chorus
- Won't You Come and Waltz with Me (Reprise) – Linda and Valentine

=== Critical reception; copyright precedent ===
The Playgoer and Society Illustrated wrote in May 1913:

Though a good deal of the fun in the play is of a decidedly cheap nature, Mr. Grossmith managed to be genuinely amusing. Miss Connie Ediss, too, in her own particular style, was irresistibly funny. Miss Emmy Wehlen used a distinctly pleasant voice to advantage, and the other characters seemed to fall into line. The music is bright and catchy, and should do a good deal for the production, but no doubt Mr. George Edwardes will make many alterations before he is satisfied with the show. The song that offended a section of the audience on the opening night has been cut out, and if a little more real humour is instilled the piece should go well.

In Chappell v. Fields, The Girl on the Film made legal history in 1914 when a U.S. Federal court held that the copyright on the show was violated because the story-line of a scene in the show, concerning the French invasion, was closely recreated in a later show called All Aboard, which concerned a fictional Japanese invasion of California.
