= Dorma Leigh =

Dorma Leigh (1890–1969) was a British dancer, actress and playwright.

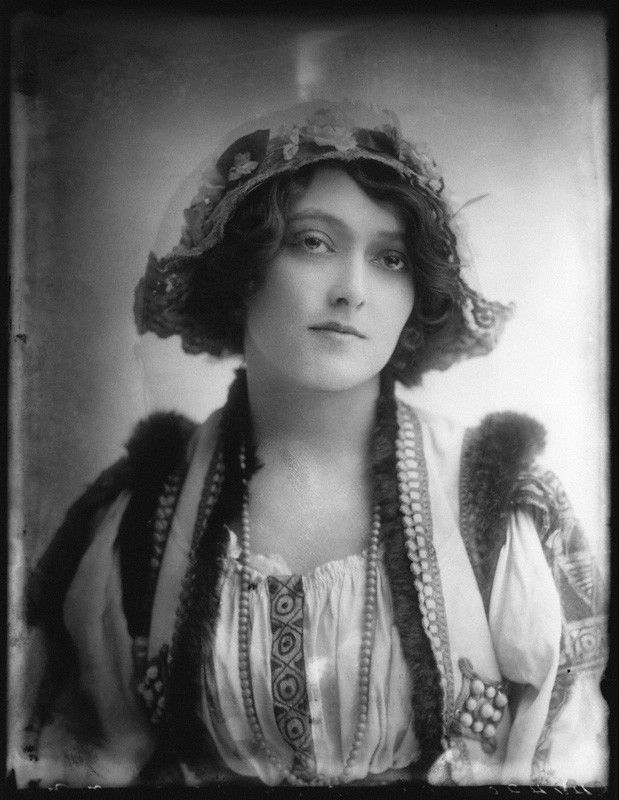
Dorma Leigh, 1912

Leigh was born Dorothy Mabel Woodley. She danced with Jan Oyra in The Girl on the Film in 1913.

In 1919 she married the writer Peter Cheyney. Cheyney petitioned for a divorce from Leigh in 1931 on the grounds of adultery but as he admitted adultery the judge granted a decree nisi in favour of Leigh.

In 1917 she wrote a play Brownie.
