= This Man Is Dangerous (novel) =

1936 novel

- First edition (UK)
- Author: Peter Cheyney
- Language: English
- Series: Lemmy Caution
- Genre: Thriller
- Publisher: William Collins, Sons 1936 (UK); Coward McCann 1938(US)
- Publication place: United Kingdom
- Media type: Print
- Followed by: Poison Ivy

This Man Is Dangerous is a 1936 thriller novel by the British writer Peter Cheyney. It is the first in his series of ten novels featuring the FBI agent Lemmy Caution. A bestseller, it enabled Cheyney to leave his job as a policeman and become a full-time novelist.

== Adaptation ==
In 1953 it was made into a French film of the same title directed by Jean Sacha and starring Eddie Constantine as Caution along with Colette Deréal, Grégoire Aslan and Claude Borelli.

== Bibliography ==
- Goble, Alan. The Complete Index to Literary Sources in Film. Walter de Gruyter, 1999.
- Ward, Alfred Charles & Hussey, Maurice . Longman Companion to Twentieth Century Literature. Longman, 1981.
