= Night Club (novel) =

1945 novel

- First edition
- Author: Peter Cheyney
- Language: English
- Genre: Thriller
- Publisher: Poynings Press
- Publication date: 1945
- Publication place: United Kingdom
- Media type: Print

Night Club is a 1945 crime thriller novel by the British writer Peter Cheyney. It is often better known by its alternative title Dressed to Kill, the name by which it was published in the United States and subsequent British versions. As with other Cheyney novels it features a hardboiled hero, and dialogue influenced by American-based writers such as Raymond Chandler.

== Synopsis ==
In immediate postwar London's swanky West End private detective Rufus Gaunt becomes mixed up in a case of murder at a celebrated night spot.

== Bibliography ==
- Reilly, John M. Twentieth Century Crime & Mystery Writers. Springer, 2015.
