= The Stars Are Dark =

1943 novel

- First edition
- Author: Peter Cheyney
- Language: English
- Genre: Spy Thriller
- Publisher: William Collins, Sons
- Publication date: 1943
- Publication place: United Kingdom
- Media type: Print
- Preceded by: Dark Duet
- Followed by: The Dark Street

The Stars Are Dark is a 1943 spy thriller novel by the British writer Peter Cheyney. It was published in America with the alternative title The London Spy Murders. It follows on from the 1942 novel Dark Duet focusing on British counter intelligence operations during the Second World War, and introduces the character of Quale a senior British intelligence officer would appear in several novels.

== Synopsis ==
Quale receives information from Morocco about the German forces operating in North Africa and puts his agents into action.

== Bibliography ==
- Panek, LeRoy. The Special Branch: The British Spy Novel, 1890-1980. Popular Press, 1981.
- Reilly, John M. Twentieth Century Crime & Mystery Writers. Springer, 2015.
