= Sinister Errand =

1945 novel

- First edition (UK)
- Author: Peter Cheyney
- Language: English
- Genre: Spy Thriller
- Publisher: Collins Crime Club
- Publication date: 1945
- Publication place: United Kingdom
- Media type: Print
- Followed by: Ladies Won't Wait

Sinister Errand is a 1945 spy thriller novel by the British writer Peter Cheyney. Cheyney known for his creations Lemmy Caution and Slim Callaghan, introduced a new character the half-American secret agent Michael Kells. It was followed by a sequel Ladies Won't Wait in 1951.

== Synopsis ==
Kells is on the trail of a group of Nazi spies operating in Britain to try and pinpoint the landing spots of V1 rockets to improve their accuracy. On his way he encounters several alluring but treacherous women.

== Film adaptation ==
In 1952 it was loosely adapted into the American film Diplomatic Courier directed by Henry Hathaway and starring Tyrone Power, Patricia Neal and Hildegard Knef. The story was updated and the setting shifted from wartime London to Trieste during the early stages of the Cold War.

== Bibliography ==
- Goble, Alan. The Complete Index to Literary Sources in Film. Walter de Gruyter, 1999.
- Panek, LeRoy. The Special Branch: The British Spy Novel, 1890-1980. Popular Press, 1981.
- Reilly, John M. Twentieth Century Crime & Mystery Writers. Springer, 2015.
