= Diplomatic Courier =

1952 American film by Henry Hathaway

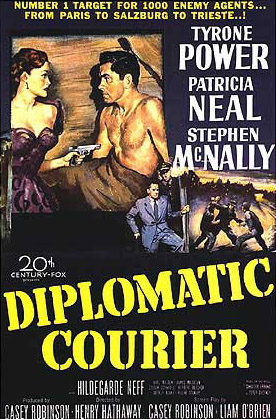
- Film poster
- Directed by: Henry Hathaway
- Screenplay by: Casey Robinson; Liam O'Brien
- Based on: Sinister Errand by Peter Cheyney
- Produced by: Casey Robinson
- Starring: Tyrone Power; Patricia Neal; Stephen McNally; Hildegarde Neff; Karl Malden; James Millican; Stefan Schnabel; Herbert Berghof; Arthur Blake; Helene Stanley
- Cinematography: Lucien Ballard
- Edited by: James B. Clark
- Music by: Sol Kaplan
- Production company: Twentieth Century-Fox
- Distributed by: Twentieth Century-Fox
- Release date: June 13, 1952 (New York)
- Running time: 98 minutes
- Country: United States
- Language: English
- Box office: $1.4 million (U.S. rentals)

Diplomatic Courier is a 1952 American spy film noir directed by Henry Hathaway and starring Tyrone Power, Patricia Neal and Stephen McNally.

== Plot ==
In post-World War II Europe, Mike Kells returns to Paris from a courier mission but is reassigned by the State Department to fly to Salzburg and meet his Navy friend Sam Carew, who will pass him a top-secret document on a train-station platform. On the flight, Mike meets Joan Ross.

At the railway station, Sam, tailed by two men, is forced to ignore Mike, who boards the same train. He sits near a woman whom Sam seems to know. As the train enters a tunnel, Mike is shocked to see the two men throw Carew's body from the train. Mike stops the train and disembarks to remain with Carew's body.

Col. Cagle and Sgt. Guelvada of the U.S. Army interrogate Mike. They believe that the woman is involved and order Mike to travel to Trieste to find her, accompanied by Guelvada. The woman is identified as Janine Betki, a singer and a possible Soviet agent. Mike visits a club where she had once performed and catches the end of a performance by comic impersonator Maximilian and sees Joan there too. A strange man slips Mike some information and flees but is killed in a hit-and-run incident by a driver who had almost killed Mike. At the scene, Mike collects the watch bearing a dedication to Sam that the man had been trying to sell him.

Janine is located and explains to Mike that she loved Carew and spied on the Soviets on his behalf. Cagle insists that Janine was a Soviet agent by showing Mike the dossier about her that was compiled by Carew. Joan contacts Mike and claims that a sniper tried to kill her. After he leaves, Joan is revealed to be the Soviet agent when she meets with Rasumny Platov to discuss acquiring top-secret papers containing details of a planned Soviet invasion of Yugoslavia.

Mike deduces that Carew had hidden microfilm in the watch, so he retrieves it from the pawnshop where Janine had left it, but Joan tries to take it from him at gunpoint before she is overpowered by Guelvada. However, the pawnbroker had cleaned the watch and removed the film.

The Soviets use Maximilian to impersonate the voice of Cagle and fool Mike and Janine. Mike is captured by the Soviets, drugged and dumped in a river and rescued by a fishing boat. Janine bargains for her freedom with Platov by agreeing to surrender the microfilm to them. In return, they will accompany her on a train to the border of the security zone. The microfilm is recovered by the American authorities. Mike boards the train and meets Janine in the presence of her Soviet spymaster. Mike fights with Platov and escapes with Janine through a window.

== Cast ==
- Tyrone Power as Mike Kells
- Patricia Neal as Joan Ross
- Stephen McNally as Col. Mark Cagle
- Hildegard Knef as Janine Betki
- Karl Malden as Sgt. Ernie Guelvada
- James Millican as Sam F. Carew
- Stefan Schnabel as Rasumny Platov
- Herbert Berghof as Arnov
- Arthur Blake as Max Ralli
- Helene Stanley as Airline Stewardess

== Production ==
The plot was loosely adapted from British writer Peter Cheyney's 1945 novel Sinister Errand.

The film's nightclub scene in the film features actor Arthur Blake, famous for his female impersonations, including those of Carmen Miranda, Franklin D. Roosevelt and Bette Davis.

== Reception ==
In a contemporary review for The New York Times, critic Bosley Crowther called the film "a picture of no more than middling appeal" and wrote: "The fault seems to lie in the writing. Casey Robinson and Liam O'Brien ... have assembled an impressive array of melodramatic occurrences, such as a mysterious murder on a train, muggings in Trieste, double dealings and, of course, a climactic 'chase' ... But they haven't concocted a story that has clarity or suspense, and Mr. Hathaway has not been able to direct it so that it looks like anything on the screen."
