= You Can Call It a Day =

1949 novel

- First edition
- Author: Peter Cheyney
- Language: English
- Genre: Thriller
- Publisher: William Collins, Sons
- Publication date: 1949
- Publication place: United Kingdom
- Media type: Print
- Pages: 191
- Followed by: Dark Bahama

You Can Call It a Day is a 1949 thriller novel by the British writer Peter Cheyney who had gained a reputation for writing popular novels in the American hardboiled style. It was the first of a trilogy featuring the private detective Johnny Vallon, a hard-drinking former army officer. It was also published under the alternative title of The Man Nobody Saw.

== Bibliography ==
- James, Russell. Great British Fictional Detectives. Remember When, 21 Apr 2009.
- Reilly, John M. Twentieth Century Crime & Mystery Writers. Springer, 2015.
