= The Woman of Rome =

1947 novel by Alberto Moravia

First US edition (publ Farrar, Straus, 1949)

The Woman from Rome (Italian: La romana) is a 1947 novel by Alberto Moravia about the intersecting lives of many characters, chief among them a prostitute and an idealistic intellectual who, after an interrogation by the Fascist officers, during which he betrays his colleagues (for reasons he himself is not able to understand), becomes completely disillusioned about everything.

Like many other Alberto Moravia novels and those by other authors of the time, this novel explores the themes of existentialism, morality, and alienation. Even though the novel is about a prostitute, an intellectual who loses his commitment and his belief in everything, and a Fascist officer, it presents compelling insights about the individuals and the society, and what links them together, as well as about their respective responsibilities.

== Adaptations ==
The novel was adapted into a film in 1954.

== In popular culture ==
- In the penultimate Mad Men episode, "The Milk and Honey Route", Don sees a woman at his motel pool reading The Woman of Rome.
- In the film McVicar, McVicar is seen reading the book in his prison cell.

== Bibliography ==
- Petri Liukkonen. "Alberto Moravia". Books and Writers.
