= One of Those Things (novel) =

1949 novel

- First edition
- Author: Peter Cheyney
- Language: English
- Genre: Thriller
- Publisher: William Collins, Sons
- Publication date: 1949
- Publication place: United Kingdom
- Media type: Print
- Pages: 256

One of Those Things is a 1949 thriller novel by the British writer Peter Cheyney. Although best known for his series featuring Lemmy Caution and Slim Callaghan, this was one of several stand-alone novels he wrote featuring hardboiled private detectives. It was also published under the alternative title Mistress Murder.

== Synopsis ==
Irish private eye Terence O’Day attends the Plumpton Races picking up tips about both a horse and a woman, the attractive but treacherous Merys Vanner.

== Reviews ==
- Briefly reviewed in the February 4, 1950 issue of The New Yorker, p. 96.

== Bibliography ==
- Reilly, John M. Twentieth Century Crime & Mystery Writers. Springer, 2015.
- Hubin, Allen J. Crime Fiction, 1749-1980: A Comprehensive Bibliography. Garland Pub., 1984.
