= Ladies Won't Wait =

1951 novel

- Author: Peter Cheyney
- Language: English
- Genre: Spy Thriller
- Publisher: William Collins, Sons
- Publication date: 1951
- Publication place: United Kingdom
- Media type: Print
- Preceded by: Sinister Errand

Ladies Won't Wait is a 1951 spy thriller novel by the British writer Peter Cheyney. It is a sequel to the 1945 novel Sinister Errand and portrays the continued adventures of Michael Kells, a half-American, half-British secret agent. It was published in the United States under the alternative title Cocktails and the Killer.

== Synopsis ==
In France while waiting for his next mission, Kells encounters an attractive fellow agent who, not long after using the code phrase "ladies won't wait" is found dead. This puts him on the trail of an East German scientist attempting to defect to the West and a ruthless Soviet female agent determined to stop him at all costs.

== Bibliography ==
- Panek, LeRoy. The Special Branch: The British Spy Novel, 1890-1980. Popular Press, 1981.
- Reilly, John M. Twentieth Century Crime & Mystery Writers. Springer, 2015.
