= Albert Szirmai =

- Born: July 2, 1880; Budapest, Hungary
- Died: 15 January 1967 (aged 86); New York City
- Other name: Albert Sirmay
- Occupations: Composer, arranger

Albert Szirmai (sometimes credited as Albert Sirmay) (2 July 1880 –15 January 1967) was a Hungarian operetta composer and music editor. Szirmai was a graduate of the Budapest Academy of Music, studying piano and composition (with Hans Koessler). Szirmai received a doctorate in music from the University of Budapest, and was devoted to creating works for the stage. He wrote music for 12 one-act plays and over 300 songs for the Budapest theater Népszínház-Vígopera, at which he was musical director. When his first operetta, The Yellow Domino, met with success, he decided to continue in the genre; it is due to the works of Szirmai, Emmerich Kálmán, and Victor Jacobi, among others, that the Hungarian operetta gained recognition internationally at the beginning of the 20th century.

Szirmai was born in Budapest. On September 3, 1923, he arrived in New York City aboard the SS Leviathan and took a post as music director for Chappell Music (a publishing house now owned by Warner Music Group). He was music editor for such Broadway luminaries as Jerome Kern, Cole Porter, Richard Rodgers and George Gershwin, and for a collection of the British duo Gilbert and Sullivan. Szirmai made headlines in 1965, when he discovered 100 unpublished songs Porter had written from 1924 to 1955, in Porter's nine room apartment in the Waldorf Towers shortly after Porter's death. "I would call the material a rich musical heritage," Szirmai told The New York Times. "There is enough material for one or two Broadway musical scores. There are dozens of excellent songs." Though he lived in America for most of his later years and was a good friend of Gershwin, Szirmai eschewed the jazz styles popular at the time; in addition to the folk music of his native Hungary, his music shows the influence of German Romanticism, particularly Felix Mendelssohn and Robert Schumann, whom he most admired. He died in New York.

== Selected works ==
- A sárga dominó (The Yellow Domino), operetta, 1907
- Bálkirályné (The Belle of the Ball), operetta, 1907
- Naftalin (Naphthalene), musical comedy, 1908
- Táncos huszárok (Dancing Hussars), operetta, 1909
- A mexikói lány (The Mexican Girl), operetta, 1912
- The Girl on the Film, musical play, 1913
- Ezüstpille (Silver Butterfly), operetta, 1914
- Mágnás Miska (Magnate Miska), operetta, 1916, Szirmai's most popular work, still performed in Hungary
- Harangvirág (Bellflower), ballad, 2 tableaux, 1918
- Gróf Rinaldo (Count Rinaldo), operetta, 1918
- Florida, ragtime, 1919
- Mézeskalács (Honey Cake), musical comedy, 1923
- The Bamboula, operetta, 1925
- Alexandra, operetta, 1925 (first presented in English as Princess Charming in 1926)
- Éva grófnő (Countess Eva), operetta, 1928
- Lady Mary, musical play, 1928
- Ripples, musical comedy, 1930
- A ballerina, operetta, 1931
- A Treasury of Gilbert & Sullivan, Simon & Schuster, New York 1941 (later published as Martyn Green's Treasury of Gilbert & Sullivan). Szirmai is probably best known to music lovers through this book. Szirmai reduced Sullivan's orchestrations of several songs from each Gilbert and Sullivan opera and simplified them so that they can be played by intermediate piano students of average skill.
- A Treasury of Grand Opera, Simon & Schuster, New York 1946. Szirmai created piano solos of arias from famous operas: Mozart's Don Giovanni, Carmen, La Traviata, Gounod's Faust, Lohengrin, et al., but this book never achieved the popularity of the Gilbert & Sullivan book. The pieces are more difficult to play, and many operatic arias are more difficult to sing than Gilbert & Sullivan.
- Tabáni legenda (The Legend of Tabán), operetta, 1957
- A Tündérlaki lányok (The Tündérlaki Sisters), operetta, 1964

== Sources ==
- Ferenc Bónis: "Albert Szirmai". Grove Music Online, ed. L. Macy. (subscription access)
- Ferenc Bónis, Andrew Lamb: "Albert Szirmai". Grove Music Online (OperaBase), ed. L. Macy. (subscription access)
