= Lady, Behave! =

1950 novel

- First edition
- Author: Peter Cheyney
- Language: English
- Genre: Thriller
- Publisher: William Collins, Sons
- Publication date: 1950
- Publication place: United Kingdom
- Media type: Print
- Preceded by: Dark Bahama

Lady, Behave! is a 1950 thriller novel by the British writer Peter Cheyney. It was the third part in a trilogy featuring Johnny Vallon, a hard-drinking former army officer now working as a private detective .

== Bibliography ==
- James, Russell. Great British Fictional Detectives. Remember When, 21 Apr 2009.
- Reilly, John M. Twentieth Century Crime & Mystery Writers. Springer, 2015.
