= Dark Hero =

1946 novel by Peter Cheyney

- First edition (publ. Collins)
- Author: Peter Cheyney
- Language: English
- Genre: Thriller
- Publisher: Collins
- Publication date: 1946
- Publication place: United Kingdom
- Media type: Print
- Pages: 255 p.
- OCLC: 154593754

Dark Hero is a 1946 thriller by Peter Cheyney featuring a Chicago gangster involved in the gang wars of the 1930s, who during the Second World War finds himself in Nazi-occupied Norway and becomes a hero of the anti-Nazi resistance - by applying essentially the same skills which had made him a successful and feared gangster.

The book's nonlinear narrative shifts and jumps back and forth between pre-war Chicago, wartime Norway, the Nazi concentration camp where the protagonist ended after being captured by the Gestapo, and London in the immediate aftermath of the war - where he seeks to exact deadly revenge on those who betrayed him to the Nazis. Events and characters from the different periods - and in particular, the different women in the protagonist's life - constantly interweave and influence each other in unexpected ways.
