= Ripples (musical) =

- Sheet Music Cover
- Music: Oscar Levant and Albert Sirmay
- Lyrics: Irving Caesar and Graham John
- Book: William Anthony McGuire

Ripples was a “new musical extravaganza” (musical comedy) in two acts with book by William Anthony McGuire, lyrics by Irving Caesar and Graham John, and music by Oscar Levant and Albert Sirmay. The show was produced by Charles Dillingham at the New Amsterdam Theatre, and opened February 11, 1930.

The musical director was Gus Salzer, the show was staged by William Anthony McGuire and choreographed by Mary Read and William Holbrook, with scenic design by Joseph Urban and costume design by Charles Le Maire. It ran for 55 performances, closing on March 29, 1930.

The headline cast was the Stone family: Fred Stone as Rip Van Winkle, Mrs. Fred Stone as Mrs. Willoughby, their daughter, Dorothy Stone, as Ripples, and in her stage debut, their other daughter, Paula Stone as Mary Willoughby. It included Dorothy's future husband, Charles Collins as Richard Willoughby, and Eddie Foy, Jr. as Corporal Jack Sterling.

The plot concerns Rip (Fred Stone), who is the great-great-grandson of the original Rip, and a great big liar. He is a serious drinker, like his forebear, and he drinks himself to sleep in the Catskills only to awake and find himself surrounded by dwarfs, who are bootleggers. They were hired to fool the state troopers because of their size. Rip's daughter, Ripples (Dorothy Stone) thinks she's in love with Trooper Jack Sterling (Eddie Foy, Jr.) but finds out she is really in love with the rich Richard Willoughby (Charles Collins).

In 1929, Fred Stone was critically injured in an airplane crash and was told he would never dance again. But he recovered to appear in “Ripples” and Brooks Atkinson of the New York Times reported, “Fred Stone is back.”[7]

== Songs ==
Act 1

- “Gentlemen of the Press”
- “Barefoot Girl”
- “Is It Love”
- “We Never Sleep”
- “I Take After Rip”
- “Babykins”
- “I'm Afraid”
- “There's Nothing Wrong in a Kiss”
- “Girls of Long Ago”

Act 2

- “Hunting Days”
- “Talk With My Heel and Toe”
- “I'm a Little Bit Fonder of You” from “Mercenary Mary” with music by Irving Caesar

The song "Anything May Happen Any Day", with music by Jerome Kern and lyrics by Graham John, was cut from the production.
