= Dark Wanton =

1948 novel

- First edition
- Author: Peter Cheyney
- Language: English
- Genre: Thriller
- Publisher: William Collins, Sons
- Publication date: 1948
- Publication place: United Kingdom
- Media type: Print

Dark Wanton is a 1948 thriller novel by the British writer Peter Cheyney. It was published in the United States under the alternative title Case of the Dark Wanton

== Synopsis ==
In London's West End, two lists of Nazi agents and collaborators, wanted by the Allies for their war crimes, go missing. Intelligence chief Peter Everard Quayle chooses to use agents accustomed to operating behind enemy lines to recover them.

== Bibliography ==
- Reilly, John M. Twentieth Century Crime & Mystery Writers. Springer, 2015.
