= A. R. Whatmore =

British actor, playwright and producer of plays (1889–1960)

A. R. Whatmore (30 May 1889 – 15 October 1960) was a British actor, playwright and producer of plays.

== Early life ==
Arthur Reginald Whatmore was born on 30 May 1889 at Much Marcle in Herefordshire, the son of Charles Arthur Whatmore and his wife Emma (née Stone). He received his education at Wyggeston Grammar School, Leicester, and worked for three years as a bank clerk after that.

His first appearance on stage was as Lord Monkhurst in Milestones (Bennett/Knoblock) at the Kennington Theatre, London in 1913. He played under Vedrenne and Eadie management for two tours of Milestones and the first tour of The Man Who Stayed at Home. He also toured with Lewis Waller in The Three Musketeers, Monsieur Beaucaire etc. During the War he served in France, 1915 – 1919.

== Hull ==
After leaving the army Whatmore spent some time in producing for Amateur Operatic Societies. Following a visit to the Hull Operatic Society in December 1923 he recognised the city's potential for repertory and the following year founded the Hull Repertory Theatre. He booked the Lecture Hall (Part of the Assembly Rooms in Kingston Square), from the proprietors, Morton's Limited. He opened on 13 September 1924 for a four-week season of modern plays, having gathered a core of professional actors supplemented by local amateurs. The rooms soon became known as the Little Theatre. He produced eighty-one plays there over the next 6 years. In 1929 the theatre was rebuilt under his supervision and reopened in September. The following January, there was a serious fire, and it had to close. After significant repairs, it reopened two months later.

== London ==
Returning to London in July 1930 he produced The Macropulos Secret at the Arts Theatre. He was director of the Embassy Theatre in Swiss Cottage, London, in partnership with Alec L Rea, from September 1930 to March 1932. At the Embassy he produced over thirty plays, including The Liar, The Witch, Precious Bane (the play), Daddy's Gone A-Hunting (the play), Britannia of Billingsgate (the play) and Romeo and Juliet.

During the rest of the 1930s he directed or acted in numerous plays in the West End, including a production of his own play Mother Knows Best (1039). He appeared in the film Eliza Comes to Stay (1936) and in the TV films The White Chateau (1938), Charley's Aunt (1938) and Rake's Progress (1939).

== Scotland and after ==
In 1940 Whatmore did a season at His Majesty's Theatre in Aberdeen, where he directed "A. R. Whatmore's London Players" in a set of eight plays. Then in 1942 he became director of the Dundee Repertory Theatre. After the war he wrote several more plays, namely She Wanted a Cream Front Door (1946), Rehearsal 1030 (1949), The Sun and I (1949) and Count Your Blessings (1950). From 1951 to 1953 he was the director of the Ipswich Repertory Theatre. In the 1950s, the name The Whatmore Players was revived, with Dennis Ramsden as producer. It ran successfully until the late 1960s, one of the said players being Mollie Sugden.

He married Hilda Mary Loverock in 1918. They had one child, a son, born in 1929. Hilda died in 1945 and Arthur remarried, to Barbara Mary Fowle in 1951. He died on 15 October 1960 at Bletchley.
