= Dark Bahama =

1950 novel

Squa o' Bahama
- First edition
- Author: Peter Cheyney
- Language: English
- Genre: Thriller
- Publisher: William Collins, Sons
- Publication date: 1950
- Publication place: United Kingdom
- Media type: Print
- Pages: 256
- Preceded by: You Can Call It a Day
- Followed by: Lady, Behave!

Dark Bahama is a 1950 thriller novel by the British writer Peter Cheyney. It was the second in a trilogy featuring the private detective Johnny Vallon, a hard-drinking former army officer. The story also features Quale, the head of British intelligence who appears on several other novels by Cheyney. Much of the action takes place in a fictional island in the Bahamas and nearby Miami in Florida.

== Synopsis ==
Johnny Vallon, head of Chennault Investigations, sends out one of his men to the West Indies to bring back a headstrong daughter of a wealthy family. However, things soon to be much more complex and treacherous as they first appear.

== Bibliography ==
- James, Russell. Great British Fictional Detectives. Remember When, 21 Apr 2009. ISBN 978-1-84468-026-9.
- Panek, LeRoy. The Special Branch: The British Spy Novel, 1890-1980. Popular Press, 1981. ISBN 978-0-87972-178-7.
- Reilly, John M. Twentieth Century Crime & Mystery Writers. Springer, 2015. ISBN 978-1-349-81366-7.
