= Lucie Štěpánková =

Czech actress

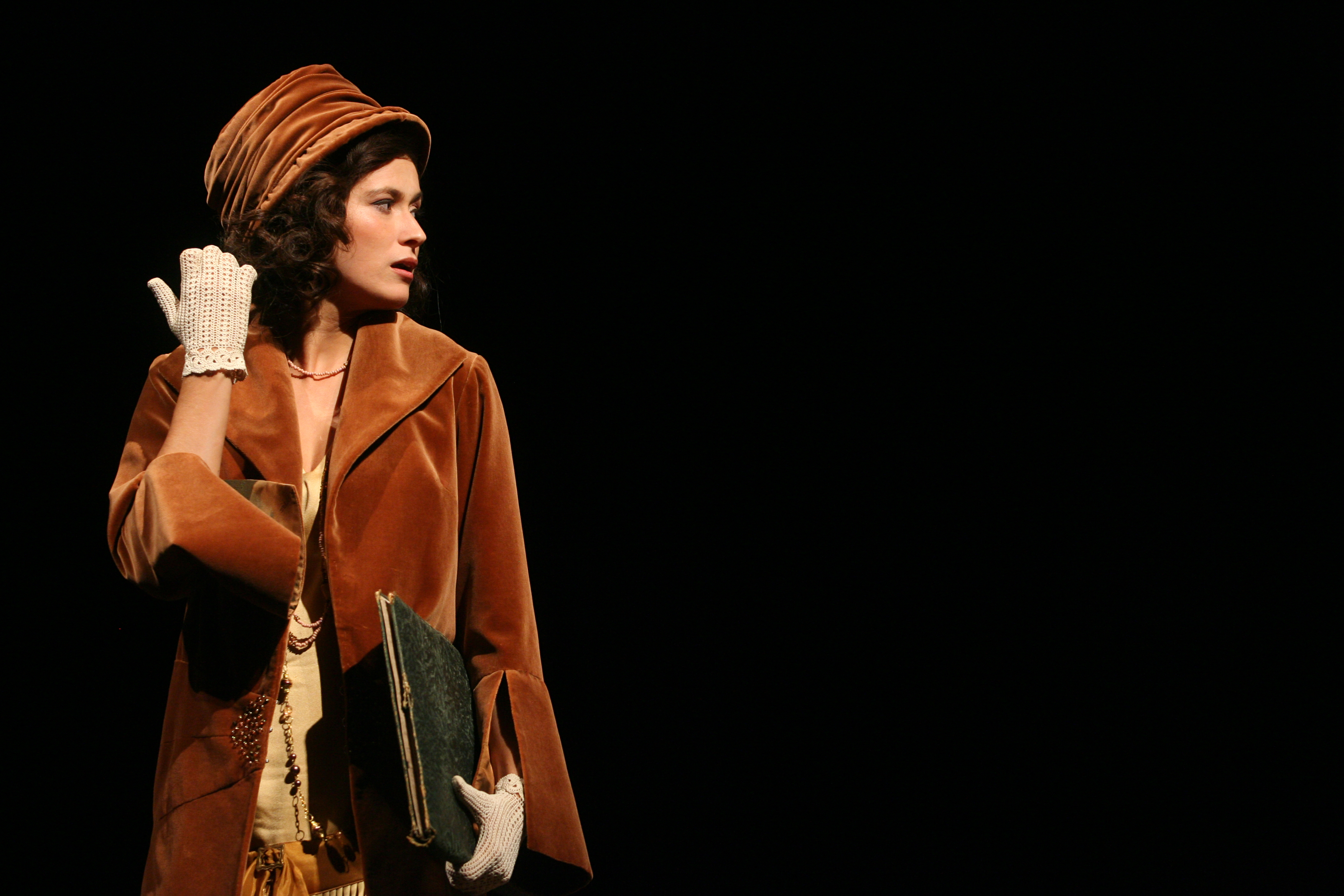
- Štěpánková as Kristina in The Makropulos Secret, Vinohrady Theatre, 2008
- Born: 30 July 1981 (age 43); Vsetín, Czechoslovakia
- Occupation: Actress
- Years active: 2004–present

Lucie Štěpánková (Lucie Štěpánek) is a Czech actress.

== Early life ==
She was born 30 July 1981 in Vsetín. She studied at Janáček Conservatory in Ostrava.

== Career ==
She hosted in Petr Bezruč Theatre Company. From 2001 to 2007, she worked in Východočeské divadlo (East Bohemian Theatre) in Pardubice. She is a member of the theatre ensemble of Divadlo na Vinohradech in Prague. In 2003, she received an award for the best woman's performance at the theatre festival České divadlo (Czech Theatre).

== Theatre ==
=== Vinohrady Theatre ===
- The Makropulos Affair .... Kristina
- Vojcek .... Marie
- Transit .... Girl
- Adina .... Adina

=== East Bohemian Theatre ===
- Ondina .... Ondina
- Romeo and Juliet .... Juliet
- Vojnarka .... Madlena Vojnarová
- Maya .... Millie
- Její pastorkyňa .... Jenůfa
- Předvečer tříkrálový
- Nápadníci trůnu
- Three Sisters
- Noc na Karlštejně .... Alena
- Měsíční běs .... Seta (Best Female Performance in Festival Czech Theatre 2002/03)
- The Merchant of Venice .... Jessika
- Ještě jednou, pane profesore .... Natasha
- Stabat Mater .... Julie
- Ledeburské zahrady .... Marie

=== Other Stage Works ===
- Doňa Bernarda House, Petr Bezruč Theatre Company
- Královské hry, National Moravian-Silesian Theatre

== Filmography ==
- Tři srdce (2007) (TV)
- Krvavý Hugo (1997)
