= Dance Without Music (novel) =

1947 novel

- First edition
- Author: Peter Cheyney
- Language: English
- Genre: Thriller
- Publisher: William Collins, Sons
- Publication date: 1947
- Publication place: United Kingdom
- Media type: Print
- Pages: 192

Dance Without Music is a 1947 thriller novel by the British writer Peter Cheyney. While Cheyney had gained his reputation with series about two celebrated characters Lemmy Caution and Slim Callaghan, he also wrote several popular stand-alone novels about hardboiled private detectives such as this. It was serialised in Britain by The News of the World. In the United States it was published by Dodd Mead in 1948.

== Synopsis ==
Private detective Caryl Wylde O’Hara becomes drawn into a case involving a man and his heroin-addicted wife.

== Bibliography ==
- Reilly, John M. Twentieth Century Crime & Mystery Writers. Springer, 2015.
