= The Makropulos Affair =

1922 play written by Karel Čapek

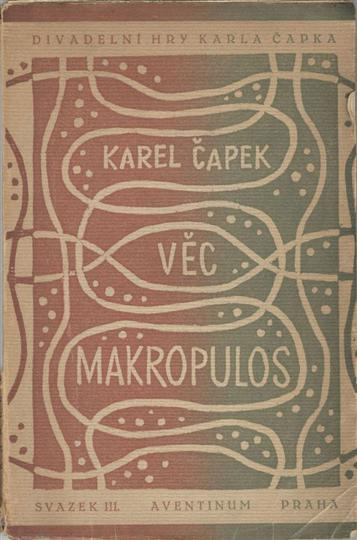
- First edition of Věc Makropulos (1922)
- Original language: Czech
- Written by: Karel Čapek
- Genre: Satire

Premiere
- Date: 21 November 1922
- Place: Vinohrady Theatre, Prague

Věc Makropulos is a Czech play written by Karel Čapek. Its title—literally The Makropulos Thing—has been variously rendered in English as The Makropulos Affair, The Makropulos Case, or The Makropulos Secret (Čapek's own preferred English rendition).

The main topic of the play is immortality. The play opens with an inheritance dispute between the aristocratic Prus family and the Gregor family, illegitimate descendants of a Prus nobleman who died in the 1820s. The dispute has lasted for a century. Famous singer Emilia Marty appears to be greatly interested in the case, without revealing her motives. She gradually reveals intimate knowledge of the 19th-century nobleman and his household, along with personal experiences from the French Revolution. Emilia turns out to be Elina Makropulos, a woman from Crete who was accidentally granted a centuries-long life through a decision of Rudolf II, Holy Roman Emperor. She has lived for over 300 years, using many aliases and always working as a singer. She was the 19th-century nobleman's mistress and a direct ancestor of the Gregor family. She now seeks a way to further prolong her life, as the time granted to her is nearing its end.

== Production history ==
Described by Čapek as a "comedy", Věc Makropulos received its first performance on 21 November 1922 in the Vinohrady Theatre in Prague. The play was produced in translation at the Arts Theatre in London, under the name The Macropulos Secret, on 8 July 1930. The producer was A. R. Whatmore and the cast included André van Gyseghem as Vitek, Lesley Wareing as Krista and Donald Wolfit as Jaroslav Prus.

== Characters ==
- Vítek, solicitor to the lawyer Kolenatý
- Kristina, daughter of Vítek, a young singer
- Albert Gregor
- Dr Kolenatý, a lawyer
- Emilia Marty, an opera singer
- Baron Jaroslav Prus
- Janek Prus, son of Baron Prus
- Count Hauk-Šendorf
- Stage Technician
- Cleaning Woman
- Hotel Chambermaid

American actors Moroni Olsen as Janek Prus and Janet Young as Emilia Marty

== Synopsis ==
In his preface to the play, Čapek noted the inspiration for the play of a scientific idea by Élie Metchnikoff, namely that aging results from a process of cellular autointoxication. Čapek also commented on the coincidence that his play appeared at around the same time as George Bernard Shaw's play Back to Methuselah, which dealt with the similar theme of extended human life span, but with a very different conclusion. Čapek also attempted to qualify criticism of his philosophical point of view, with respect to the idea of extended human life span, as pessimistic.

=== Act 1 ===
Kolenatý's law office, Prague, 1913

Vitek, clerk to the lawyer Kolenatý, notes that the probate case of Gregor v. Prus has been going on for nearly a century. Kolenatý represents the middle-class Gregors against the wealthy and aristocratic Prus family. Albert Gregor comes in to ask about the case, which Kolenatý has taken to the Supreme Court, where he is waiting for a final resolution. Gregor expresses frustration and wishes for the case to end. Vitek's daughter Kristina, a young singer, enters. She praises Emilia Marty, a famous singer whom she has seen rehearsing and despairingly states that she will never be as great an artist as Emilia Marty.

Kolenatý returns, with news that the case has not yet been resolved. Accompanying him is Emilia Marty, to the surprise of Kristina. Emilia expresses interest in the case of Gregor v. Prus, after learning about the case that morning. Kolenatý reviews the history of the dispute. Baron Joseph Ferdinand Prus died in 1827, leaving no will or legitimate children. His cousin, Baron Emmerich Prus-Zabrze-Pinski from Poland, claimed the estate. However, Albert's ancestor, Ferdinand Gregor, made the same claim, and asserted that Baron Prus had promised the estate to him, based on an oral statement from Baron Prus, though with no physical document to support this statement. One document in the records mentions a "Gregor Mach". Emilia states that Ferdinand Gregor was the out-of-wedlock son of Baron Prus and an opera singer, Ellian MacGregor. The name "MacGregor" thus explains "Gregor Mach". Kolenatý is startled at these assertions and the confidence with which Emilia makes them and asks how Emilia knows all this, which she does not answer and avoids explaining. Kolenatý states that the case seems to be on the side of the Prus family, because there is no will. Emilia asks what would be required for Albert Gregor to win the case. Kolenatý says that the missing will would settle the case. Emilia says that there is, in fact, such a document, and claims that there is an old cupboard in the Prus mansion where important papers were kept where he will find the document they need.

Kolenatý thinks Emilia is inventing these stories. However, Gregor insists Kolenatý investigate at once and even threatens to take the case to a rival lawyer. Kolenatý leaves, and Albert tells Emilia that if he does not win the estate, he will be penniless and shoot himself. He is already infatuated with Emilia, and makes advances to her. Emilia, bored and indifferent, refuses him. However, she asks his help in retrieving a document that will be found with the will.

Kolenatý returns with Jaroslav Prus. They found the will where Emilia said it would be, and Jaroslav congratulates Albert on his victory – if he can prove that Ferdinand Gregor was the Baron's out-of-wedlock son. Emilia says she can provide such written evidence.

=== Act 2 ===
The empty stage of the opera house

A stagehand and a cleaning woman discuss Emilia's performance. Jaroslav enters, seeking Emilia, accompanied by his young son Janek, and Kristina. Kristina tells Janek that they cannot continue their relationship, because she needs to concentrate on her singing to become a great artist like Emilia.

Emilia enters, but spurns them all, including Janek, who instantly falls under her spell, and Albert, who brings her expensive flowers. Albert comments that Emilia's singing is superhuman and perfect – too perfect. There is a discussion about a past opera singer, Strada, from 100 years earlier, whom Emilia mocks from what appears to be first-hand experience of hearing Strada sing in person. Gregor's only knowledge of Strada is from history. There is a further similar discussion about Jean-Paul Marat and the French Revolution, where again Emilia expresses strong opinions that appear to derive from her direct experience of the people and events, even though they occurred 120 years earlier.

The old Count Hauk-Šendorf enters. At first, Emilia treats him with disdain, but then he states that she seems to resemble Eugenia Montez, a Romani woman with whom he had an affair in Andalusia half a century before. Emilia softens her attitude, and then engages Hauk-Šendorf in conversation in Spanish, reminiscent of his past times. She calls him by a past pet name and asks him for a kiss, to his surprise. He then takes his leave. Vitek asks that Emilia sign a photograph for his daughter Kristina, which Emilia does.

Jaroslav then comments on her interest in and striking knowledge of his family, then asks if she knows the name Makropulos. This startles Emilia, but she then recovers her bearings. Prus reveals the presence of additional documents, including an additional document whose contents he does not know, with a seal from Baron Prus intended for the hands of "his son Ferdinand", which he has never opened. Emilia's interest is again sparked, and she demands that document. Jaroslav asks for a reason, which Emilia does not directly answer. Jaroslav proceeds to ask Emilia what she knows about Ellian MacGregor, whom he describes in disparaging terms, after reading her love letters that detail explicit sexual behaviour. Emilia takes offence at this part of the conversation. Jaroslav then mentions another name, Elina Makropulos, which also startles Emilia. He says that the name registered as the mother of Ferdinand Gregor was Elina Makropulos. Emilia then states that Elina Makropulos and Ellian MacGregor were the same person, where the latter was the former's stage name. Emilia goes on to say that Elina Makropulos was her aunt. Jaroslav is skeptical at this explanation, saying that this explanation would be more credible if Elina Makropulos were her great-grandmother's aunt. He continues saying that only a descendant of Ferdinand Makropoulos can claim the estate. Emilia offers to buy a mysterious document found with the will, but Jaroslav refuses and leaves.

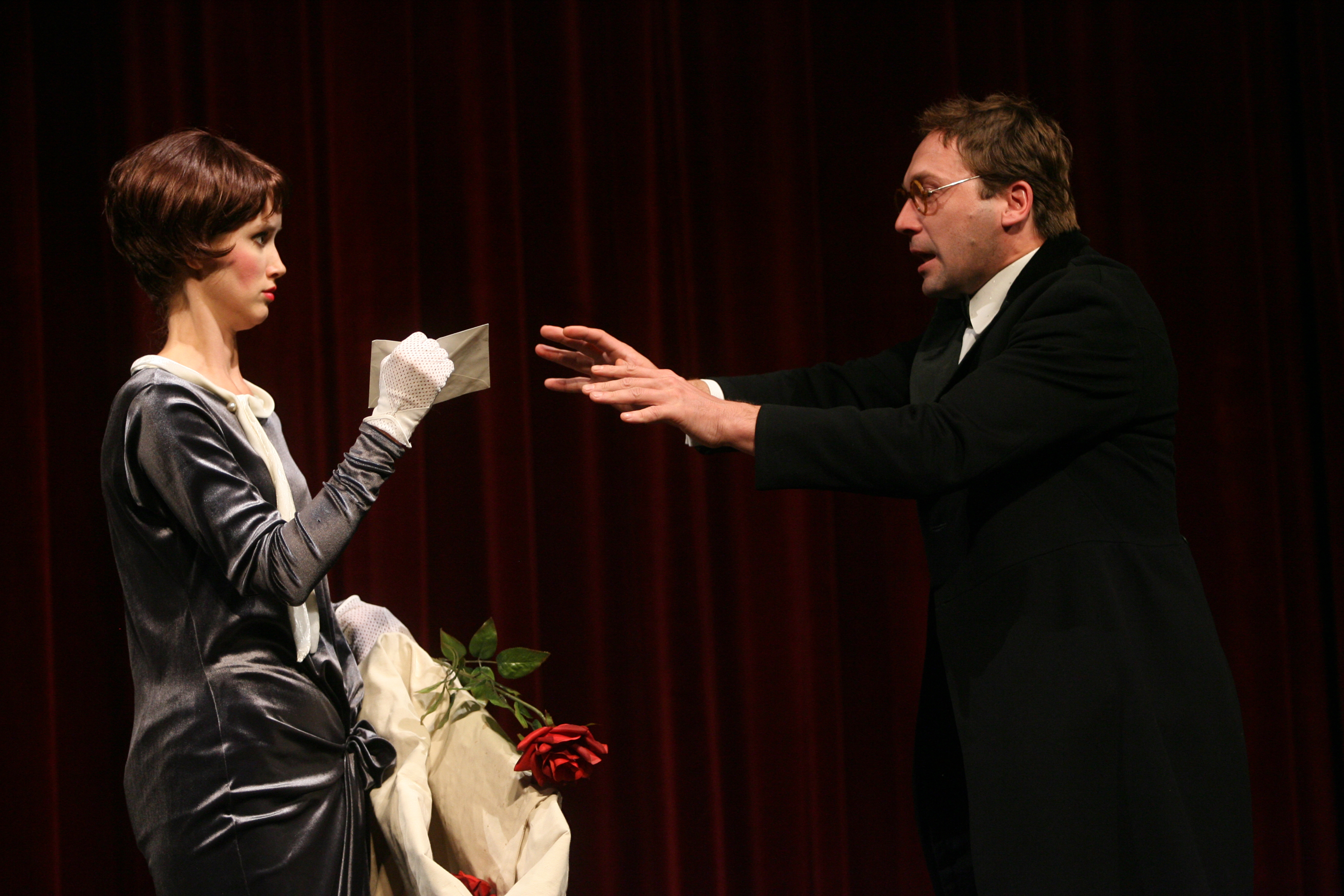
Lucie Štěpánková (Kristina) and Braňo Holiček (Janek), 2008

Albert returns and again pleads his love. Emilia spurns his advances again. However, she also tells him that he must obtain from Prus papers that will provide him with proof to win the inheritance. After she again says that she cannot love him, he threatens her with violence. However, she angrily shows past scars, and snores in response to his final protestations of love. He leaves. Janek returns, and Emilia asks him to get the document for her. Jaroslav overhears this, and states that the document is in a safe. Janek leaves. Jaroslav then offers to provide the document himself if Emilia will spend the night with him. She agrees.

=== Act 3 ===
Emila's hotel room the next morning

Emilia and Jaroslav have spent the night together. Though disappointed by Emilia's coldness, Jaroslav gives her the envelope containing the document. A chambermaid arrives with news for Jaroslav, that Janek has committed suicide because of his infatuation with Emilia. Jaroslav grieves at his lack of showing affection to Janek, but Emilia is indifferent and asks if she has to tear her hair out every time someone dies. Jaroslav briefly shows his anger at her reaction, just before Count Hauk-Šendorf enters.

Hauk-Šendorf says that he has left his wife and wants to elope with Emilia to Spain, with his wife's jewelry to help pay their way. Hauk-Šendorf briefly laments that it is terrible to be old, and wants to start life anew with Emilia. Albert, Kolenatý, and Kristina then arrive. Kolenatý earlier received a document allegedly signed by Ellian MacGregor, to which Emilia had earlier alluded. However, Gregor notices that the ink is fresh, and accuses Emilia of forgery. Emilia swears that in fact, Ellian MacGregor truly wrote that document. The others all note the similarity of this handwriting to the signature on the picture for Kristina. Gregor threatens to call the police, and then tosses a parcel of papers on a table. Among the documents, there is visible a seal with the letters EM, dating from 1603. Gregor then notices a locket with the Hauk-Šendorf coat of arms, which Hauk-Šendorf recognises as a curio that he gave to Eugenia Montez 50 years earlier. They continue to look through the papers, and find documents with other names like Elsa Müller and Ekaterina Myshkin, names all with the initials E.M.

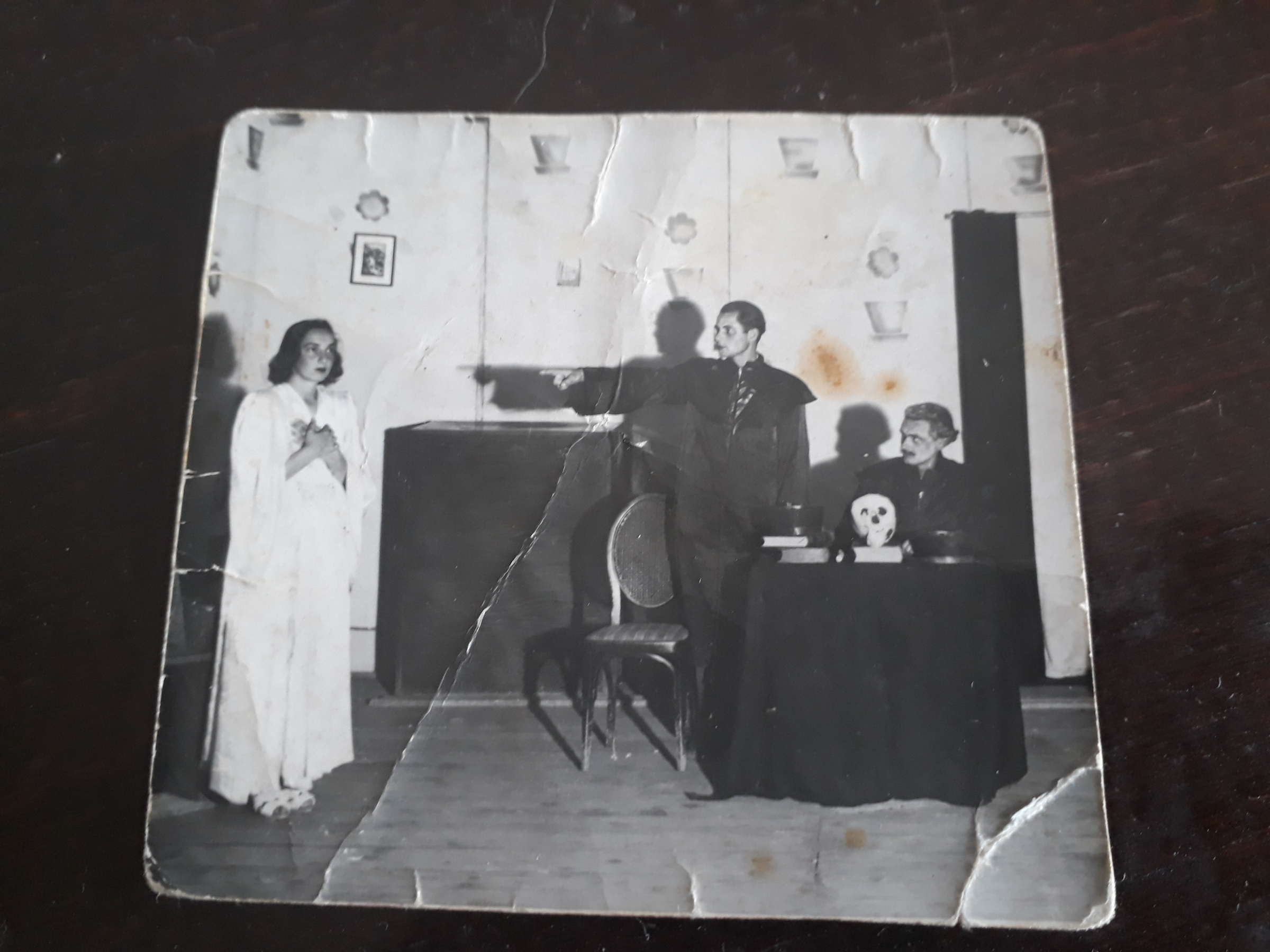
Rendition of the play in the Nováky labor camp, 1942

Emilia asks that the party stop reading the documents, and says that she will then explain everything. She asks that the hotel room be re-arranged to resemble a court room, and asks for time to dress. Kolenatý asks that a crucifix, Bible and candles be brought from a funeral home, as well as a skull.

The final scene is staged as a mock trial, with Kolenatý as judge. He places Emilia, who has drunk some whiskey just beforehand, under oath. Gregor accuses Emilia Marty of fraud and forgery, as well as practices against common decency. Kolenatý asks Emilia to state her name, place of birth, age, and the name of her father. She replies that she is Elina Makropulos, from Crete, born in 1585, the daughter of Hieronymus Makropulos, personal physician to Emperor Rudolf II. Kolenatý disbelieves the answers. When Jaroslav asks again her name, she repeats: Elina Makropulos. Jaroslav asks if she was the mistress of Baron Joseph Prus: she says yes. Gregor then asks if she was Ellian MacGregor: she replies yes. She further states that Ferdinand Gregor was her son, which makes her a direct ancestor of Gregor (his great-great-great-great-great-grandmother). Kolenatý again asks her date of birth, which she repeats: 1585. Hauk-Šendorf asks then if she was Eugenia Montez: she answers yes. She also admits to being Elsa Müller and Ekaterina Myshkin.

Emilia confesses that she knew about the sealed wills because Baron Prus showed her the documents before his death. In turn, she mentioned to the Baron a document, "Věc Makropulos", which she loaned to him. However, this document was then lost among the Baron's papers. Emilia then became desperate to retrieve it. Hauk-Šendorf asks what is this "Věc Makropulos". Emilia explains that Emperor Rudolf II wanted his court alchemist to prepare a potion that would grant him 300 years of youth. When the potion was ready, the Emperor ordered Hieronymus Makropulos to test it on his 16-year-old daughter Elina first. She fell into a coma, and Hieronymus Makropulos was sent to prison. However, after a week, Elina awoke and fled with the formula, which proved to be successful. She has since lived an itinerant life for three centuries.

Kolenatý remains disbelieving of Emilia's story, and accuses her of forging the signature of Ellian MacGregor and stealing the locket of Eugenia Montez. Emilia replies that she is, in fact, all of those people. Kolenatý angrily demands the name of her accomplice: Emilia replies that there is no accomplice. She takes a drink, but then collapses, because Kolenatý has doctored the drink. Even in her ailing state, she maintains that she is Elina Makropulos. Gregor summons a doctor, who then orders strong black coffee to be brought in. Kristina leaves the room to bring the coffee to Emilia. The "Věc Makropulos" remains concealed on Emilia's person.

Kolenatý starts to realise that Emilia may have been telling the truth during the whole of this "trial", as does Jaroslav, who admits that Gregor has the right to the inheritance. Kolenatý, Gregor, Jaroslav and Vitek then engage in a discussion about the implications of the "Věc Makropulos", this formula for 300 years of youth. Vitek argues that giving humans extended life will allow them to do great works over an extended duration. Kolenatý counter-argues that human civilisation is based on the current normal life span of humans, and prolonged life would completely disrupt the social system in all aspects, from contracts and pensions to marriage. Hauk-Šendorf proposes the idea of smaller doses of extended life, on the order of 10 years. A discussion then ensues on who should be granted such extended life. Jaroslav argues that the intellectual elite of men (no women at all) should be granted this elixir, with weaker people allowed to die normally. Gregor argues that only descendants of Elina Makropulos should be allowed this formula.

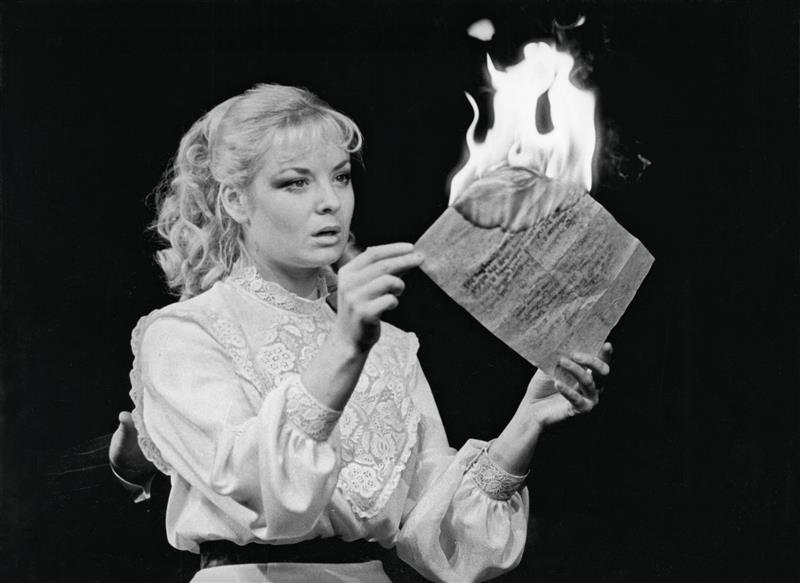
Vilma Cibulková as Kristina burning the parchment, 1985

Kristina re-enters the room, to ask the others to speak quietly and let Emilia sleep. Kolenatý asks her if she would want to live 300 years. Kristina demurs, and questions whether such people would truly be happy. Emilia returns to the room, and explains that she wanted to retrieve the "Věc Makropulos" to gain another 300 years of life. However, she tells everyone that her extended life has led to exhausted apathy and a sense of cynical futility about people. She tells the others that they are happy because they could die at any moment, but also that she is afraid of death.

Emilia takes out the parchment, and offers it to Gregor, Hauk-Šendorf, Kolenatý, and Jaroslav in succession. Each of them declines. Emilia finally offers it to Kristina, saying that this formula will allow her too to become a great singer, and to live for 300 years. Kristina takes the parchment, but then places it over a lit candle. The "Věc Makropulos" slowly catches fire, to the momentary dismay of the men, such as when Hauk-Šendorf asks for just a small piece of the parchment. However, he and the others accept the destruction of the "Věc Makropulos". Emilia laughs after the parchment has completely burned, and proclaims the "end of immortality".

== Analysis ==
Czech novelist and playwright Ivan Klíma summarised Čapek's thematic intent of the play as follows:

"What Čapek intended to convey in The Makropulos Secret was the idea that people should not yearn for an unreachable longevity whose consequences they cannot begin to foresee, but rather live so that the brief time allotted to us will have been spent living fully, experiencing things, accomplishing things, and managing to be happy."

Klíma also expressed his opinions on aspects of the final scene as follows:

"The unanimity of the characters refusing longevity is highly improbable, from a psychological point of view, and the characters' behavior, when considered logically, can only be deemed irresponsible. The final lines of the play are among the least convincing, the most contrived of all that Capek wrote".

Věc Makropulos features in the philosophy essay "The Makropulos Case: Reflections on the Tedium of Immortality" by Bernard Williams. In his essay, Williams utilizes the case of Elina Makropulos to argue that an immortal life should not be desirable.

== Adaptations ==
Between 1923 and 1925, Leoš Janáček adapted the play into an opera of the same name.
