= This Man Is Dangerous (1953 film) =

1953 film by Jean Sacha

- Film poster
- Directed by: Jean Sacha
- Written by: Jacques Berland; Marcel Duhamel
- Based on: This Man Is Dangerous Peter Cheyney
- Produced by: Georges Sénamaud
- Starring: Eddie Constantine; Colette Deréal; Grégoire Aslan
- Cinematography: Marcel Weiss
- Edited by: Paulette Robert
- Music by: Jean Marion
- Production companies: EDIC; Les Films Lutétia; Sonofilm
- Distributed by: Sonofilm
- Release date: 22 November 1953
- Running time: 92 minutes
- Country: France
- Language: French/English

This Man Is Dangerous (French: Cet homme est dangereux) is a 1953 French thriller film directed by Jean Sacha and starring Eddie Constantine, Colette Deréal and Grégoire Aslan. It is an adaptation of Peter Cheyney's 1936 novel This Man Is Dangerous. It followed the film La môme vert-de-gris which had been Eddie Constantine's debut as Lemmy Caution and it was also successful at the box office.

The film's sets were designed by the art director Jean d'Eaubonne.

== Synopsis ==
Lemmy Caution is assigned to neutralise the international crimininal network of villain Siégella (Grégoire Aslan ) as an undercover agent. In order to infiltrate the gang he pretends to be an escapee. During his covert investigations at the French Riviera he gets to know a beauty named Constance (Colette Deréal) who is associated with Mister Siégella. Lemmy can convince him that he would help to kidnap the rich American heiress Miranda Van Zelden (Claude Borelli). Once Lemmy has obtained enough proof to have Siégella convicted, he informs Interpol. After he has sent documents to Interpol, his cover is blown and he has to fight for his life.

== Cast ==
- Eddie Constantine as Lemmy Caution
- Colette Deréal as Constance
- Grégoire Aslan as Siegella
- Claude Borelli as Miranda Van Zelden
- Véra Norman as Susanne
- Jacqueline Pierreux as Dora
- Roland Bailly as Johny
- Guy Decomble as Jacques le Dingue
- Luc Andrieux as Maurice
- Henry Djanik as William Bosco
- Émile Genevois as L'athlète
- Colette Mareuil as L'entraîneuse
- Michel Nastorg as Govas
- Michel Seldow as Pierrot les Cartes

== Bibliography ==
- Goble, Alan. The Complete Index to Literary Sources in Film. Walter de Gruyter, 1999.
