= Grégoire Aslan =

Swiss-Armenian actor (1908–1982)

- in Cet homme est dangereux (1953)
- Born: Krikor Kaloust Aslanian; 28 March 1908; Switzerland or Constantinople, Ottoman Empire
- Died: 8 January 1982 (aged 73); Cornwall, England
- Resting place: Neuilly-sur-Seine community cemetery
- Other name: Coco Aslan
- Occupation: Actor
- Years active: 1935–1982
- Spouses: Jacqueline Dumonceau (m. 1940, divorced) Denise Noël (m. 1948; div. 1955)

Grégoire Aslan (born Krikor Kaloust Aslanian (Armenian: Գրիգոր Գալուստ Ասլանեան, romanized: Krigor Kalowst Aslanean); 28 March 1908 – 8 January 1982) was a Swiss-Armenian actor and musician.

== Early life ==
He was born to an Armenian family in Switzerland or in Constantinople, according to different sources. He made his professional début at 18 as a vocalist, trumpeter and drummer with the Paris dance band of Ray Ventura et ses Collegiens, then launched an acting career under the name of Coco Aslan. He also performed with guitarist Django Reinhardt.

== Career ==
Aslan's first film appearance was uncredited in Marc Didier's 1935 Le Billet de mille. His first credited appearance was in Feux de joie (1939), along with conductor Ventura. During World War II he toured South America with actor Louis Jouvet and eventually started his own theatre troupe. He became an indispensable feature in many British and American films, usually playing foreigners – Russians, Frenchmen, Italians, Germans, Albanians and Middle Easterners – with equal finesse.

Aslan's screen appearances include gangster boss Duca in Joe MacBeth (1955), King of Kings (1961) as Herod, and Cleopatra (1963) as Pothinus. In 1961, in The Devil at 4 O'Clock, alongside Frank Sinatra and Spencer Tracy, he portrayed Marcel, a criminal who finds repentance by giving his life to save children from being killed by a volcanic eruption on a South Sea island. He played a police chief in Paris When It Sizzles (1964) and The Return of the Pink Panther (1975). He appeared in over 110 film and TV roles. He also appeared on the French stage in productions from 1946 to 1981.

== Personal life ==
From 1948 to 1955, Aslan was married to French theatre actress Denise Noël.

== Death ==
Aslan died of a heart attack in Breage, whilst visiting Cornwall, England.

== Selected filmography ==
- Le Billet de mille (1935)
- Adventure in Paris (1936) as Un membre de l'orchestre de Ray Ventura (uncredited)
- Feux de joie (1939) as Coco
- Whirlwind of Paris (1939) as Coco
- Radio Surprises (1940) as Robert
- La fruta mordida (1945)
- Are You Sure? (1947) as Coco
- Sleeping Car to Trieste (1948) as Poirier, the chef
- Keep an Eye on Amelia (1949) as Le prince
- Wicked City (aka Hans le marin, 1949) as Le Brésilien
- A Man Walks in the City (1950) as Ambilarès
- Last Holiday (1950) as Gambini
- Cairo Road (1950) as Lombardi (as Coco)
- Cage of Gold (1950) as Duport
- The Adventurers (1951) as Dominic
- Les Joyeux Pèlerins (1951) as Ernest Duranval
- The Red Inn (1951) as Barboeuf
- No Vacation for Mr. Mayor (1951) as M Beaudubec
- Jouons le jeu (1952) as l'acteur (segment 'La jalousie')
- Une enfant dans la tourmente (1952) as Coudert
- A Mother's Secret (1952) as Georges Lavier
- Innocents in Paris (1953) as Carpet Seller
- Good Lord Without Confession (1953) as Varesco
- Le Chevalier de la nuit (1953) as Le préfet de police
- This Man Is Dangerous (1953) as Siegella
- Act of Love (1953) as Commissaire (uncredited)
- La rafle est pour ce soir (1954) as Mortimer Schoom
- La soupe à la grimace (1954) as Karl Worden
- Oasis (1955) as Pérez
- Mr. Arkadin (1955) as Bracco
- Joe MacBeth (1955) as Duncan
- Une fille épatante (1955) as Atcheminocc
- L'Homme aux clés d'or (1956) as Bodoni
- L'Homme et l'Enfant (1956) as Zajir
- He Who Must Die (1957) as Agha
- The Suspects (1957) as Inspecteur Ben Hamman
- Quelle sacrée soirée (1957) as Le prince Yucca
- Casino de Paris (1957) as Mario
- A Bomb for a Dictator (1957) as Général Ribera
- Windom's Way (1957) as Mayor Lollivar
- The Tricyclist (1957) as Mouillefarine
- The Snorkel (1958) as The Inspector
- Sea Fury (1958) as Fernando
- The Roots of Heaven (1958) as Habib
- Checkerboard (1959) as Stanley père
- Killers of Kilimanjaro (1959) as Ben Ahmed
- Our Man in Havana (1959) as Cifuentes
- Under Ten Flags (1960) as Master of Abdullah
- The Criminal (1960) as Frank Saffron
- The 3 Worlds of Gulliver (1960) as King Brob
- Bernadette de Lourdes (1961)
- The Rebel (1961) as Aristotle Carreras
- The Invasion Quartet (1961) as Debrie
- King of Kings (1961) as Herod the Great
- The Devil at 4 O'Clock (1961) as Marcel
- The Happy Thieves (1961) as Dr. Victor Muñoz
- Village of Daughters (1962) as Gastoni (A Father)
- (Marco Polo, unfinished French film, 1962)
- Cleopatra (1963) as Pothinus
- The Main Chance (1964) as Potter
- Une ravissante idiote (1964) as Bagda
- Paris When It Sizzles (1964) as Police Insp. Gilet
- Aimez-vous les femmes ? (1964) as Inspecteur Rossi
- Crooks in Cloisters (1964) as Lorenzo
- Amori pericolosi (1964) as Il generale (segment "Il generale")
- The Gorillas (1964) as Maître Lebavard
- The Yellow Rolls-Royce (1964) as the Albanian Ambassador
- The High Bright Sun (1965) as Gen. Stavros Skyros
- Marco the Magnificent (1965) as Achmed Abdullah
- Moment to Moment (1965) as Insp. DeFargo
- A Man Could Get Killed (1966) as Florian
- Our Man in Marrakesh (1966) as Achmed
- Lost Command (1966) as Dr. Ali Ben Saad
- The 25th Hour (1967) as Dobresco
- Tiffany Memorandum (1967) as The Shadow
- Marry Me! Marry Me! (1968) as Mr. Schmoll
- A Flea in Her Ear (1968) as Max, Hotel Coq Dor Owner
- The Thirteen Chairs (1969) as Psychiatrist
- You Can't Win 'Em All (1970) as Osman Bey
- Le Cinéma de papa (1971) as Le producteur
- The Pebbles of Etratat (1972) as Timakoff
- Die rote Kapelle (1972, TV miniseries) as Baron Maximowitsch
- Sex-shop (1972) as Le père d'Isabelle / Father-in-law
- The Girl from Hong Kong (1973) as Harris
- The Golden Voyage of Sinbad (1973) as Hakim
- QB VII (1974, TV miniseries) as Sheik Hassan
- The Girl from Petrovka (1974) as Minister
- The Return of the Pink Panther (1975) as Lugash Police Chief
- Bloedverwanten (1977) as Rudolphe De Guys
- Gloria (1977) as Le patron du cabaret
- Meetings with Remarkable Men (1979) as Armenian Priest / Le prêtre arménien
