= The Evolution of Naval Weapons =

1947 United States government textbook by L. Sprague de Camp

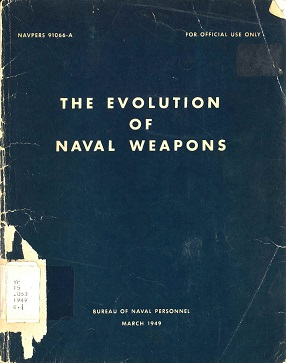
- 1949 edition
- Author: L. Sprague de Camp
- Language: English
- Subject: History
- Publisher: Training Activity Bureau of Naval Personnel
- Publication date: 1947
- Publication place: United States
- Media type: Print (Paperback)
- Pages: 53 p.

The Evolution of Naval Weapons is a United States government textbook by L. Sprague de Camp. It was first published in a 53-page edition by the Training Activity section of the Bureau of Naval Personnel in August 1947 as NAVPERS 91066. A 1949 edition of 67 pages was designated NAVPERS 91066-A. The work was credited to the Bureau rather than de Camp. The 1947 edition was reproduced from a mixture of standard sized (8 1/2" x 11") typed and mimeographed sheets, and was stapled between blue paper covers. The 1949 edition was printed, with the illustrations integrated with the text.

== Summary ==
The work is a 40,000-word study of the history of naval ordnance and armor and consists of twelve chapters plus a short concluding section.

== Contents ==
- Chapter 1. Sticks and Stones.
- Chapter 2. Explosives.
- Chapter 3. Fuzes.
- Chapter 4. Artillery.
- Chapter 5. Small Arms.
- Chapter 6. Torpedoes.
- Chapter 7. Mines.
- Chapter 8. Depth-Charges.
- Chapter 9. Rockets and Guided Missiles.
- Chapter 10. Bombs.
- Chapter 11. Chemical Warfare.
- Chapter 12. Sighting and Ranging.
- The Navy's Future Weapons.
