= She Wanted a Cream Front Door =

1947 comedy play

- Written by: A.R. Whatmore
- Original language: English
- Genre: Comedy

Premiere
- Date premiered: 6 February 1947
- Place premiered: Apollo Theatre, London

She Wanted a Cream Front Door is a 1947 comedy play by the British writer A.R. Whatmore.

It ran for 129 performances at the Apollo Theatre in London's West End between 6 February and 31 June 1947. The cast included Robertson Hare, Peter Haddon, Sidney Vivian and Ian Carmichael. It was produced by Austin Melford.

== Bibliography ==
- Wearing, J.P. The London Stage 1940-1949: A Calendar of Productions, Performers, and Personnel. Rowman & Littlefield, 2014.
