= Dark Duet =

1942 novel

- First edition (UK)
- Author: Peter Cheyney
- Language: English
- Genre: Spy Thriller
- Publisher: Collins (1942 UK); Dodd, Mead (1943 US)
- Publication place: United Kingdom
- Media type: Print
- Followed by: The Stars Are Dark

Dark Duet is a 1942 spy thriller novel by the British writer Peter Cheyney. Cheyney had become known for his hardboiled crime thrillers featuring Lemmy Caution and Slim Callaghan, but this novel was his first fully-fledged espionage novel. The novel is set in wartime London, Lisbon and Ireland. It was published in the United States with the alternative title The Counterspy Murders.

== Synopsis ==
Two British counter-intelligence officers track a network of German agents which they learn is based out of Dublin.

== Bibliography ==
- Panek, LeRoy. The Special Branch: The British Spy Novel, 1890-1980. Popular Press, 1981.
- Reilly, John M. Twentieth Century Crime & Mystery Writers. Springer, 2015.
- Wark, Wesley K. Spy Fiction, Spy Films and Real Intelligence. Routledge, 2013.
