= Peter Cheyney =

British crime writer (1896–1951)

- Peter Cheyney in 1938
- Born: 22 February 1896; London, UK
- Died: 26 June 1951 (aged 55); London, UK
- Occupations: Policeman and novelist
- Writing career
- Period: 1925–1951
- Genre: Crime

Reginald Evelyn Peter Southouse-Cheyney (22 February 1896 – 26 June 1951) was a British crime fiction writer who flourished between 1936 and 1951.

Cheyney is perhaps best known for his short stories and novels about agent/detective Lemmy Caution. Starting in 1953, the Caution stories were adapted into a series of French-language movies, all starring Eddie Constantine. However, the best known of these films, the 1965 science fiction film Alphaville, was not directly based on a Cheyney novel.

Another Cheyney creation was the private detective Slim Callaghan, who also appeared in a series of novels and subsequent film adaptations.

== Early life ==
Peter Cheyney was born in Whitechapel in 1896, the youngest of five children, and educated at the Mercers' School in the City of London. He began to write skits for the theatre as a teenager, but this ended when the First World War began. In 1915 he enlisted in the British Army as a volunteer, in 1916 was wounded on active service and published two volumes of poetry, Poems of Love and War and To Corona and Other Poems. The next year, 1917, his military service ended.

Starting in the late 1920s, Cheyney worked for the Metropolitan Police as a police reporter and crime investigator. Until he became successful as a crime novelist, he was often quite poor. It is said that he got his start through a bet; when Cheyney remarked that anyone could write a book in the idiom of the American thriller, he was wagered five pounds that he could not. Cheyney sold his first story as the result of this bet.

== Career and characters ==
Cheyney wrote his first novel, the Lemmy Caution thriller This Man Is Dangerous in 1936 and followed it with the first Slim Callaghan novel, The Urgent Hangman in 1938. The immediate success of these two novels assured him of a flourishing new career, and Cheyney abandoned his work as a freelance investigator. Sales were brisk; in 1946 alone, 1,524,785 copies of his books were sold worldwide.

A meticulous researcher, he kept a massive set of files on criminal activity in London. The files were destroyed during the Blitz in 1941, but he soon began replacing his collection of clippings. Cheyney dictated his work. Typically he would "act out" the stories for his secretary, Miss Sprauge, who would copy them down in shorthand and type them up later.

The Caution books read very much like what they are: pulp stories written in ersatz American by a British writer. Slim Callaghan, however, is a non-American based in Cheyney's home territory of London.

In the first Callaghan novel, the private detective works from Chancery Lane in a Marlowe-type shabby office and he has difficulty paying the bills. Unlike Marlowe, however, Callaghan is ambitious, and after success helping a rich female client, he is able to make the step up to having his own agency with a fancy office and a pretty secretary in Berkeley Square.

Subsequent novels in the series follow a tried and tested pattern. Callaghan's services are sought by a rich and attractive female who typically is involved in some upsetting business (often blackmail) that precludes her from going to police. Callaghan meets the lady, likes what he sees (Cheyney appears to have studied women's fashion, for he never fails to describe in detail every lady's clothes and jewellery), and is nonchalant and impudent, which simultaneously upsets and attracts her. The new client is either afraid to tell all the facts or is deliberately misleading him, and Callaghan must work out the truth for himself.

Callaghan begins his investigating, in Marlowe-style, by putting himself about and stirring up trouble, which attracts the attention of a number of people (including at least one shady nightclub owner) who are parts of the puzzle, and who supply him with enough information to plan further strategy.

During these cases, usually over a period of days, Callaghan will push himself to the limit. He will get no sleep, drink continually ('three fingers of straight whisky'), and drive his Jaguar long distances. He will meet a string of attractive women who throw themselves at him, while he only has eyes for his refined client. He will hand out and receive beatings, tamper with evidence, and outsmart both criminals and the police until the case is solved and his client is extricated from trouble and danger. Only then (to the chagrin of his secretary, who has a long-standing crush) will he reap the dual reward of favours from the client accompanied by a substantial cheque.

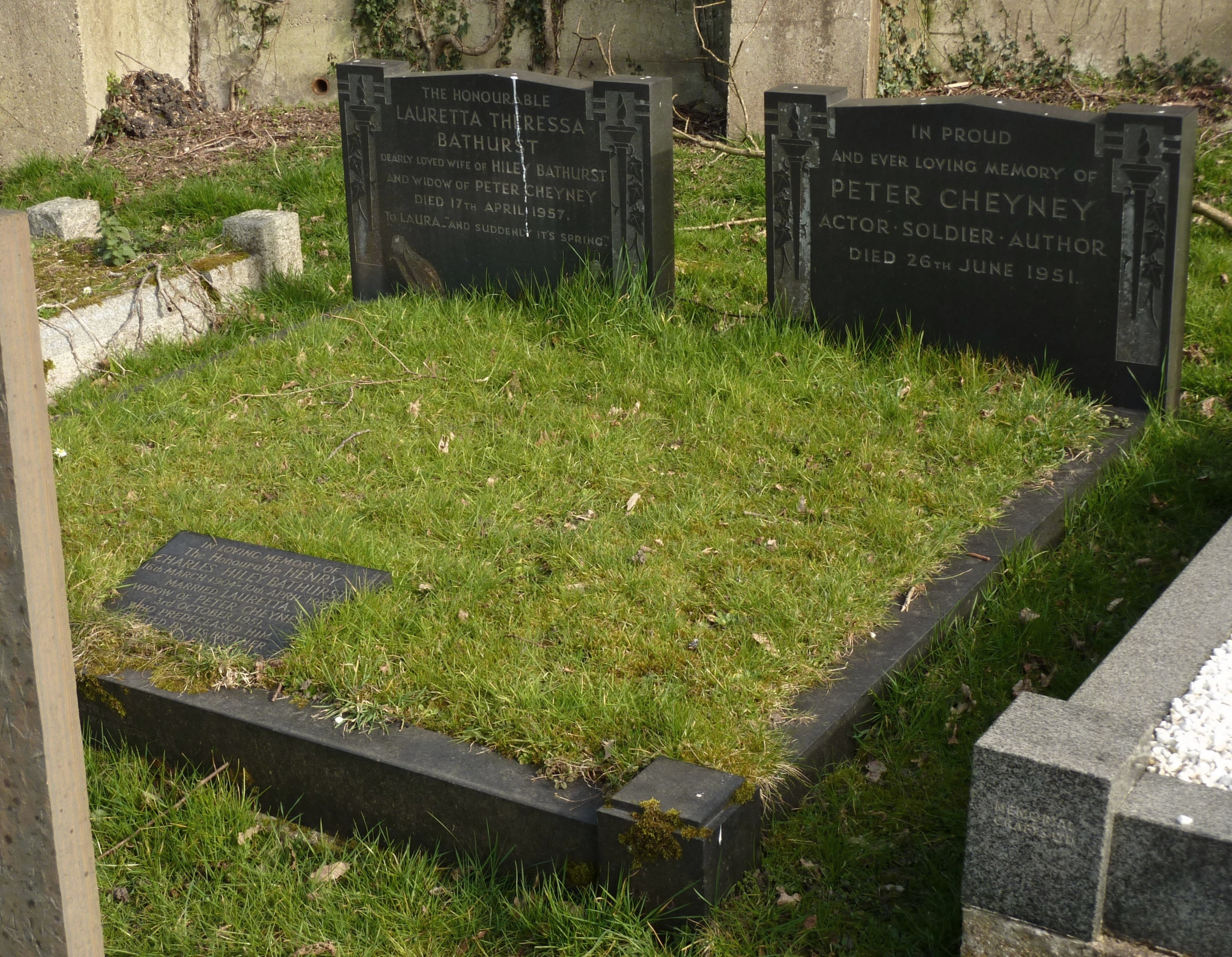
The graves of Peter Cheyney and his third wife Lauretta at Putney Vale Cemetery, London, in 2015

Cheyney's "Dark" series was widely praised during World War II for bringing more realism to espionage fiction. In their casual brutality and general "grubbiness," the "Dark" novels seem to have foreshadowed much of the Cold War fiction of the mid to late 1960s. Anthony Boucher placed these later works in the context of Graham Greene and Joseph Conrad.

The characterisation of Ernest Guelvada in the "Dark" series is one of the high points of Cheyney's career. A cheerfully sadistic war operative whose objective is to deplete the ranks of opposing forces in a leisurely but thorough fashion, the loquacious Guelvada still finds the time to dress immaculately, drink immoderate amounts of alcohol and remain a counter agent.

Cheyney published one volume of short stories, advice to critics and a few poems in No Ordinary Cheyney (London: Faber and Faber, 1948).

Cheyney makes a cameo appearance in the Dennis Wheatley/J.G. Links "dossier" mystery "Herewith the Clues," published in 1939. He appears as man-of-fortune William Benson, one of the suspects.

He died at age 55, after having fallen into a coma. He was buried at Putney Vale Cemetery in London.

== Personal life ==
From all accounts, Cheyney lived much like his characters, working too hard, living the fast and careless life with a breathtaking abandon that eventually caught up with him. In addition to his literary skills, "he was a fencer of repute, a golfer, a crack pistol-shot, and a jiu-jitsu expert."

He joined the New Party (set up by Sir Oswald Mosley and precursor to the later British Union of Fascists or BUF) in 1931, heading its youth detachment, which protected public meetings.

He was married three times: in 1919 to the stage actress Dorma Leigh (from whom he was divorced in 1931), in 1934 to Kathleen Nora Walter Taberer, and in 1948 to Lauretta Theresa Singer. He had no children.

== List of works ==
=== Lemmy Caution ===
- This Man Is Dangerous (1936) – filmed as This Man Is Dangerous (France; Jean Sacha, 1953)
- Poison Ivy (1937) – filmed as La môme vert-de-gris (France; Bernard Borderie, 1953)
- Dames Don't Care (1937) – filmed as The Women Couldn't Care Less (France; Bernard Borderie, 1954)
- Can Ladies Kill? (1938)
- Don't Get Me Wrong (1939) – filmed as Vous pigez (France; Victor Trivas and Jacques Doniol-Valcroze, 1955)
- You'd Be Surprised (1940)
- Your Deal, My Lovely (1941) – filmed as Your Turn, Darling (France; Bernard Borderie (1963)
- Never a Dull Moment (1942)
- You Can Always Duck (1943)
- I'll Say She Does! (1945) – filmed as Women Are Like That (France; Bernard Borderie, 1960)
- G-Man at the Yard (1946)

=== Slim Callaghan ===
- The Urgent Hangman (1938) – filmed as Meet Mr. Callaghan (UK; Charles Saunders, 1954)
- Dangerous Curves (1939), US title: Callaghan
- You Can't Keep the Change (1940)
- It Couldn't Matter Less (1941), US title: Set-up for Murder – filmed as More Whiskey for Callaghan (France; Willy Rozier, 1955)
- Sorry You've Been Troubled (1942), US title: Farewell to the Admiral - filmed as Your Turn, Callaghan (France; Willy Rozier, 1955)
- They Never Say When (1944)
- Uneasy Terms (1946) – filmed under the same title in 1948
- Calling Mr. Callaghan (1953) – collected short stories

=== Dark Series ===
A loose series grouping together several different protagonists:

- Dark Duet (1942), also as The Counterspy Murders
- The Stars Are Dark (1943), also as The London Spy Murders
- The Dark Street (1944), also as The Dark Street Murders
- Sinister Errand (1945), also as Sinister Murders – filmed as Diplomatic Courier (US; Henry Hathaway, 1952)
- Dark Hero (1946), also as The Case of the Dark Hero
- Dark Interlude (1947), also as The Terrible Night
- Dark Wanton (1948), also as Case of the Dark Wanton
- You Can Call It a Day (1949), also as The Man Nobody Saw
- Dark Bahama (1950), also as I'll Bring Her Back
- Lady, Behave! (1950), also as Lady Beware
- Ladies Won't Wait (1951), also as Cocktails and the Killer

=== Other novels ===
- Another Little Drink (1940), also as Premeditated Murder and A Trap for Bellamy
- Night Club (1945), also as Dressed to Kill
- Dance Without Music (1947). Serialised, News of the World.
- Try Anything Twice (1948), also as Undressed to Kill
- One of Those Things (1949), also as Mistress Murder

=== Short story collections ===
- You Can't Hit a Woman (1937)
- Knave Takes Queen (1939; enlarged edition, 1950)
- Mr. Caution – Mr. Callaghan (1941)
- Making Crime Pay (1944), collected stories, articles, radio plays
- The Curiosity of Etienne MacGregor (1947), also as The Sweetheart of the Razors
- No Ordinary Cheyney (1948)
- Velvet Johnnie (1952)
- The Adventures of Julia (1954), US title: The Killing Game
- He Walked in Her Sleep (1954), also as MacTavish
- The Mystery Blues (1954), also as Fast Work

=== Uncollected short fiction ===
- The Snow Lady. Morecambe Guardian, 21 March 1930 (Alonso Mactavish)
- The Snow Man. Hastings & St Leonards Observer, 27 December 1930 (Alonso Mactavish)
- Angel Unawares. Sheffield Daily Independent Christmas Budget, 19 December 1936
- Bread upon the Waters. Rugby Advertiser, 18 February 1938

=== Uncollected non-fiction ===
- Curse of the Crystal. Belfast Telegraph, 1 January 1931
- Suicide Walkers - Are You One?. Sunderland Daily Echo & Shipping Gazette, 14 July 1937

=== Radio plays ===
- The Adventures of Alonzo MacTavish, serial, 1939
- The Callaghan Touch, serial, 1941
- Knave Takes Queen, 1941
- The Key, 1941
- The Lady Talks, 1942
- Again—Callaghan, 1942
- The Perfumed Murder, 1943
- Concerto for Crooks, 1943
- Parisian Ghost, Saturday Night Theatre, April 1943
- The Callaghan Come-Back, serial, 1943
- The Adventures of Julia, 1945
- Way Out, 1945
- Pay-off for Cupid, 1946
- Duets for Crooks, 1946

== Biographies and memoirs ==
A 1954 biography of Cheyney, Peter Cheyney: Prince of Hokum, was written by Michael Harrison. (London: N. Spearman, 1954.)

Cheyney published a semi-autobiographical volume, Making Crime Pay and after his death at least two biographical essays appeared in posthumous collections. An essay by Viola Garvin, "Peter Cheyney" appears in Velvet Johnnie a posthumous collection of Cheyney's short stories (London: Collins, 1952, pages 7–32). The other essay is anonymous. It appears in the Cheyney collection Calling Mr. Callaghan (London: Todd, 1953, pages 7–16).
