= Dark Interlude (Cheyney novel) =

1947 novel

- First edition
- Author: Peter Cheyney
- Language: English
- Genre: Spy Thriller
- Publisher: William Collins, Sons
- Publication date: 1947
- Publication place: United Kingdom
- Media type: Print

Dark Interlude is a 1947 spy thriller novel by the British writer Peter Cheyney. It features a British secret agent Shaun Aloysius O'Mara and his superior Quale, a recurring figure in Cheyney's novels.

== Synopsis ==
O'Mara is sent to Paris to uncover information that will help track down the lone remaining member of the Nazi German espionage network still at large. While there he becomes entangled with fellow spy Tanga de Sarieux.

== Bibliography ==
- Panek, LeRoy. The Special Branch: The British Spy Novel, 1890-1980. Popular Press, 1981.
- Reilly, John M. Twentieth Century Crime & Mystery Writers. Springer, 2015.
