= Gail Kubik =

American composer (1914–1984)

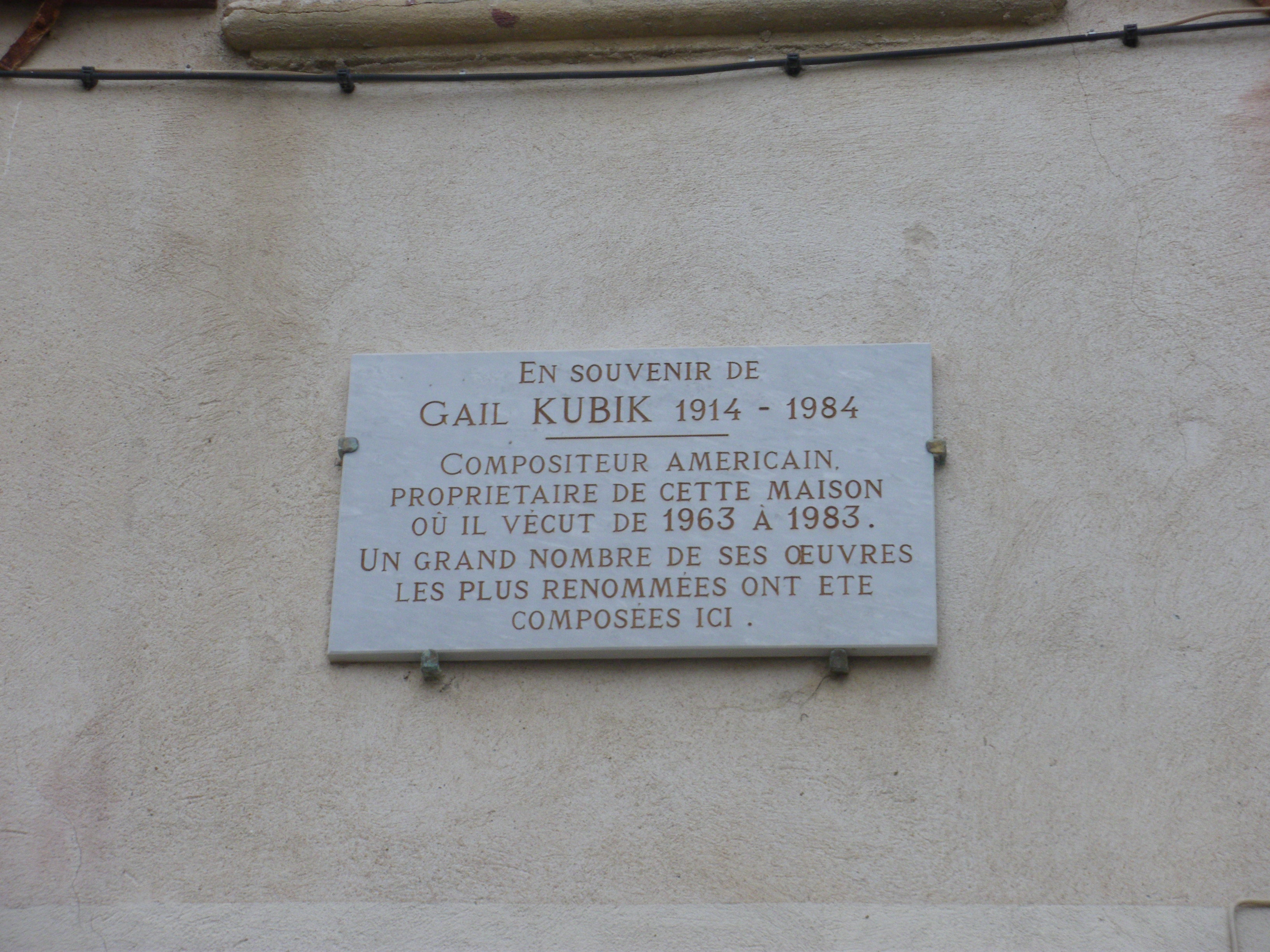
In memory of Gail Kubik, American composer who lived in Venasque, France, from 1963 until 1983

Gail Thompson Kubik (September 5, 1914 – July 20, 1984) was an American composer, music director, violinist, and teacher.

He first gained widespread recognition for his scores for World War II documentary films, including Memphis Belle: A Story of a Flying Fortress (1944). He is best remembered for winning the 1952 Pulitzer Prize for Music for his Symphony Concertante, and for his score for Gerald McBoing-Boing.

== Early life and education ==
Kubik was born in South Coffeyville, Oklahoma, the second of three sons to Henry and Evalyn O. Kubik, a singer who had studied with Schumann-Heink. In the 1930s his mother and her sons formed the Kubik Ensemble (Gail on violin, Howard on piano, and Henry Jr. on cello) and toured the midwest. All three brothers studied at the Eastman School of Music, where Kubik studied composition with Howard Hanson and violin with Samuel Belov and Scott Willits. It is likely that Kubik played violin in Eastman's orchestra, taking part in the American Composers' Concerts and getting nationally broadcast on NBC. Kubik graduated with distinction in 1934 in a class that included Wayne Barlow and Kent Kennan.

Kubik then received his master's degree in music in 1935 at the American Conservatory of Music in Chicago, where he studied with Leo Sowerby. He studied one year in 1937–1938 towards a doctorate in music at Harvard University where he studied with Walter Piston and Nadia Boulanger.

He was a prodigy; at the time becoming Eastman's youngest graduate (in both violin and composition), the youngest student admitted to Harvard's doctoral program, and the youngest MacDowell Colony fellow.

== Career ==
His professional career began with a series of teaching engagements. He first taught violin and composition at Monmouth College (where his brother taught cello) from 1935/1936. He then taught composition and music history at Dakota Wesleyan University from 1936/1937. In 1938 he moved to New York City and taught for two years at Columbia University Teachers College. From 1940 he taught at the Rand School and at Finch Junior College. Among his students included Gordon Binkerd and Marjorie Merryman.

In 1940 he joined NBC Radio in New York as staff composer. In the 17 weeks before his contract expired in 1941, he contributed scores for The World Is Yours and Great Plays series, and for the NBC 1940 Christmas program Puck. In this year he also composed incidental music for Max Catto's play They Walk Alone.

In 1941 he composed the score the short documentary film Men and Ships, which was produced by George Gercke for the United States Maritime Commission. The score was a success, and Kubik conducted the NBC Symphony Orchestra in the work's radio premiere. This success lead to his 1942 recruitment by the Office of War Information's Motion Picture Bureau to be their Director of Music, working for Lowell Mellett. He moved to Hollywood where he composed and conducted the music for many of the OWI's films, most notably The World At War, and supervised other composers in their work for the OWI (including Virgil Thomson, Morton Gould, Paul Creston, Arthur Kreutz, and Gene Forrell).

In 1943 he joined the Army Air Corps, attaining a rank of corporal, and worked in the First Motion Picture Unit in Culver City. For the FMPU he scored hundreds of training films, often resorting to stock scores, and recorded by the Air Forces Orchestra from the AAF First Radio Unit. He worked with fellow composers Alexander Steinert and David Rose. His best successes in this period were the scores for William Wyler's films The Memphis Belle in 1944 and Thunderbolt! in 1945, written during an overseas assignment in England.

In 1943, he was a board member of the Los Angeles-based Musicians' Congress Committee (along with Aaron Copland, Darius Milhaud, Lena Horne, William Grant Still and other musical luminaries). This committee was formed and sponsored by Max Silver with a goal of promoting American art music during the war, and was suspected of being a Communist front.

During his time in Hollywood during the war, he came to understand that Hollywood studios had an obstinate dependence on or expectation for a conservative musical vocabulary. Summarizing his own experiences, as well as those of his colleagues Copland and Thomson, he concluded that in the absence of creative or understanding Hollywood studio heads, documentaries offered the "serious" composer the only real opportunity to break into the film business.

In 1949 he would compose the two works for which he is ultimately best remembered today. The first was the score for the film C-Man, produced by Irving Lerner, a former OWI colleague. Kubik later reworked this score into the Pulitzer Prize-winning composition Symphony Concertante. The second was the score for UPA's Academy-award winning animated short Gerald McBoingBoing, produced by John Hubley, a former FMPU colleague.

These successes earned Kubik the Rome Prize in 1950, which began a two year residency at the American Academy in Rome. His co-fellows during this time included Ulysses Kay, Harold Shapero, Aaron Copland, Lukas Foss, Leo Smit, George Rochberg, and Frank Wigglesworth Jr. During this period he completed his score for the film Two Gals And A Guy, and finished the score for his Symphony Concertante. Upon the completion of his fellowship, Kubik remained in Rome, where he created a concert version of the Gerald McBoingBoing score, and composed the score for Philip Stapp's avant-garde animation Transatlantico. He returned to America in 1954 to again work with Wyler to score The Desperate Hours.

His score for Desperate Hours was drastically cut from the film under studio executive pressure, and he vowed never to work in Hollywood again.

Kubik frequently took material from his documentary and functional music and directly used or reworked it for his concert music. This took the common form of rearranging scores for eponymous concert suites, but also incorporation into otherwise unrelated concert works like symphonies and piano works. This would also be the case for two of his most recognized works, the Symphony Concertante and the score for Gerald McBoingBoing. In 1949 he composed the music for the film.

He was an editor for Mercury Music Corporation, editing their American Music for Piano series. From 1970 until 1980, he was composer-in-residence at Scripps College in Claremont, California. He also lectured.

== Artists' rights ==
Kubik was one of the few 'serious' American composers who recognized and appreciated the vast audience (and licensing fees) that the field of original radio, TV, and film scores could provide, and the quality of music that he and his classically trained peers could provide. He lamented of the "highway robbery" that broadcast networks perpetrated by limiting composers' fees and copyrights. He was frequently involved in the securing publication and performing rights for himself, often struggling against larger and less compromising entities. In 1945 Kubik had successfully sued the membership organization American Composers' Alliance for selling the license to his music to BMI in 1944 without his consent. The case was decided by the New York Supreme Court.

Where possible, Kubik was careful to structure his contracts with film studios so that he retained the rights to the scores. This was how he was able to rework the score for C-Man into his Pulitzer-winning Symphony Concertante. At times it resulted in retracting completed scores, when the studio refused to grant rights. His score for 1955's The Desperate Hours was lauded by peers and audiences, but was drastically cut by Paramount's head Don Hartman. Two years later, in an unprecedented move, Paramount returned the music rights to Kubik, and produced the recording of a new suite derived on the score titled Scenario for Orchestra.

In another example, in 1962, Anatole de Grunwald hired Kubik to score I Thank A Fool. Kubik refused to sign a contract unless he retained the music rights; however production (and funding) proceeded anyway on the score and recording with the London Symphony Orchestra. With the final mix ready to deliver, MGM still refused to relinquish music rights to Kubik, Kubik pulled his music and involvement from the film, with the studio left with the music production bill. The music was later repurposed into his composition Scenes for Orchestra.

Between his 1952 Pulitzer Prize, and the success of his score for UPA's Gerald McBoing-Boing, his reputation was such that in 1953 he signed a lucrative guaranteed publishing contract with ASCAP's Chappell Music. The musical trades positioned this deal as part of an ongoing competition between ASCAP and BMI (also mired in antitrust litigation at the same time) for the prestige of signing contracts with respected composers.

== Personal life ==
Kubik was married and divorced four times. From 1963 to 1983 he frequently lived in Venasque, France, where he had purchased and renovated several homes. One of these homes is now owned by Darius Brubeck.

He died aged 69 in Claremont, California, after a lengthy hospitalization with kala-azar, contracted during a trip to Africa.

== Awards and honors ==
He was awarded the 1952 Pulitzer Prize for Music for Symphony Concertante.

He was twice a Guggenheim fellow for composition, in 1944 and 1965. He was a Rome Prize winner in 1950, and his subsequent fellowship in Rome lasted two years; he would return as a guest artist in 1965, 1972, and 1975.

He was a permanent fellow at MacDowell arts colony, having first been awarded a fellowship in 1936. He was artist in residence at Yaddo in 1948 (at same time as Patricia Highsmith, Marc Brandel, Bob White, Clifford Wright, Irene Orgel, Chester Himes, Vivien MacLeod, Harold Shapero, Stanley Levine, and Flannery O'Connor).

He was the dedicatee of Ingolf Dahl's 1944 Music for Brass Instruments. The work's final fugue movement's second theme is a notational representation of Kubik's army serial number 32824096.

He was one of the composers interviewed for Irwin Bazelon's book Knowing the Score: Notes on Film Music.

He was a National Patron of the professional music fraternity Delta Omicron, member of the American Society of University Composers and American Society of Music Arrangers. The National Association of American Composers and Conductors awarded him a citation in 1943 for "direction of music in important Government films". He was on the national advisory board for the University of Missouri–Kansas City's Institute for Studies in American Music founded in 1967.

A major archive of his works and papers were originally held by the Library of Congress, but have since moved to Kansas State University.

== Works ==
- The Night Has a Thousand Eyes, sung frequently by his mother during The Kubik Ensemble days in the 1930s
- Two Sketches for String Quartet, 1932
- American Caprice for piano and orchestra (1933; orch. 1936)
- Piano Trio (1934)
- Trivialities for Flute, Horn, and String Quartet
- Violin Concerto, Op. 4 (1934/36, dedicated to Jascha Heifetz)
- American Caprice for piano and small orchestra (1936, premiered by the Monmouth College Orchestra)
- Serenade for cello and piano (1936)
- Danse for piano (1939), winner of 2nd prize in the Kansas state music club piano composition contest.
- Daniel Drew, 1938 choral work conducted by Nadia Boulanger on tour in 1938/1939
- Suite for Large Orchestra, 1939, premiered by Rochester Philharmonic under Howard Hanson
- Solace (1939), premiered at the League of Composers
- A Woman's Armor, premiered 1939 by Hope Manning at the League of Composers.
- Slow Movement for String Quartet (1939)
- In Praise of Johnny Appleseed (for bass, chorus, and orchestra), based on the Vachel Lindsay poem, entered into the 1942 National Federation of Music Clubs' choral composition contest. (Kettering won this contest with a work based on a Vachel Lindsay Johnny Appleseed poem)
- Violin Concerto No. 2 (1940/41, dedicated to Ruggiero Ricci, winner of the 1941 Heifetz competition for Best Violin Concerto by an American Composer)
- Suite for 3 recorders (1941), believed to be the first American composition for recorders, commissioned by accountant and recorder enthusiast Harold Newman (who would publish it under the eponymous Hargail Recorder Music Publishers).
- Sonatina for Piano (dedicated to Walter Piston) (1941)
- Scherzo for Large Orchestra (1941)
- They Walk Alone, incidental music for Max Catto's play for its New York run.
- Fantasy, for chamber orchestra (1943)
- Sonatina for Violin (1943), premiered by Louis Kaufman
- A War-Time Litany (1944) for men's chorus, brass and percussion, premiered by the Army Music School in Fort Myer.
- Symphony No. 1 in E-flat major (1946)
- Sonata for piano (1947), first recorded by Jacob Maxin in Maxin's recorded debut.
- Nocturne for flute and piano (1947)
- Little Suite for flute and two clarinets (1948)
- Celebrations And Epilogue, 10 short pieces for piano (1938–50). One movement entitled "Four Planes, Forty Men: An Elegy", incorporates music from his score to The Memphis Belle.
- Hop up, my ladies, American folk song sketch for men's chorus and solo violin. Traditional arrangement with additional lyrics by Kubik, copyrighted in 1950 by Southern Music.
- Pioneer women, for mixed chorus. Lyrics by Phyllis Merrill, written for an NBC radio broadcast. Copyrighted by Southern Music in 1950.
- Nine settings of Stephen Vincent Benét Book of Americans, including George Washington and Theodore Roosevelt. Commissioned in 1948 for the Robert Shaw Chorale radio program, published by Southern Music in 1950.
- Soliloquy and Dance, for violin and piano, copyrighted by Southern Music in 1950.
- Songs About Women, 3 songs for voice and piano (Like a Clear, Deep Pool, She Who Was All Piety, and A Woman's Armor) on poems by Audrey Wurdemann, published by Southern Music in 1950.
- Symphony Concertante for piano, viola, trumpet and orchestra (1952)
- 2nd Sonata for piano
- Thunderbolt Overture, derived from his score for the FMPU film Thunderbolt
- Music for Dancing, for orchestra, incorporating material derived from his 1940 NBC radio scores.
- Symphony No. 2 in F major (1954–56), commissioned by the Louisville Orchestra and nominated for a Pulitzer Prize. Incorporates music from his score to Transatlantico.
- Symphony No. 3 (1956), written for the New York Philharmonic, which incorporates music from his WWII-era film scores to Dover, The World At War, and Air Pattern Pacific.
- Scenario for Orchestra (1957), a concert suite based on his drastically cut score to The Desperate Hours.
- Divertimento No. 1 for thirteen players (1959). Incorporates music from his score to Transatlantico. Recorded by Contemporary Records, where Nadia Boulanger contributed liner notes.
- Divertimento No. 2 for eight players (1959)
- Sonatina for clarinet and piano (dedicated to Nadia Boulanger) (1959)
- String Quartet (1960)
- Symphony for 2 pianos (reworked from Symphony No. 1) (1949–79)
- Scenes for Orchestra (1962), a reworking of material originally composed and withdrawn for the film I Thank A Fool. Broadcast in the U.S. in 1968 but never published.
- One of the Birthday Variations (1965). This was a set of variations of Otto Luening's song, a brief movement from Luening's 2nd suite for solo flute, written on the occasion of Luening's 65th birthday, performed for Luening at the American Academy in Rome. The contributing composers were Kubik, Alexei Haieff, John Eaton, William O. Smith, Vincent Frohne, Richard Trythall, and Everett Helm, all present at the concert.
- Music for Cleveland, for piano, premiered July 25, 1968, by Jacob Maxin
- Prayer and Toccata for 2 pianos and organ (1969–79)
- A Record of our Time (1970), for chorus, narrator, soprano, alto, tenor, and orchestra. Commissioned by Kansas State University for the opening of the McCain Auditorium . A protest piece that summarizes Kubik's feelings "about some aspects of the 20th century which put in doubt... the values of contemporary Western civilization: the Jewish Holocuast, our lack of concern about social injustices in America, our tragic involvement in Vietnam, the cancerous racism... which helped to tear the country apart." In one movement titled "The Hate Machine", the chorus recites a long list of terrifying war slogans.
- Five Theatrical Sketches (Divertimento III) (1971) for violin, cello, and piano. Incorporates music previously composed for the score to the television episode The Silent Sentinel, and from his score for Leopold the See-Through Crumbpicker
- Pastorale and Spring Valley Overture (1972), for orchestra. The first movement incorporates music previously composed for the score to the television episode The Silent Sentinel.
- Fables in Song, for medium voice and piano, based on poems by Theodore Roethke. Includes The Kitty-Cat Bird, The Sloth, The Lamb, and The Serpent. Written at latest by May 1969, first published by MCA Music in 1975.
- Arrangements for a capella choir of "Listen to the Mocking Bird", "I Ride an Old Paint", and "Oh Dear! What Can The Matter Be?"
- Quiet Piece for organ
- Lyric Piece for violin and piano
- The Memphis Belle: A War Time Episodes for Narrator and Orchestra, based on his score to The Memphis Belle

=== Operas ===
- Boston Baked Beans: An Opera Piccola (1952), a refashioning of his score for The Miner's Daughter
- A Mirror for the Sky (a folk opera, first performed 1957)

=== Radio, film, and TV scores ===
- Men and Ships (1940)
- Colleges at War (1942), written for OWI
- Manpower (1942), written for OWI
- Paratroops (1942), written for OWI. Kubik also arranged this score into a concert suite.
- The World at War (1942), written for OWI
- Dover (1942, aka Dover Front Line), written for OWI
- Earthquakers (1943), written for FMPU
- Air Pattern-Pacific (1944), written for FMPU
- The Memphis Belle (1944), written for FMPU
- Thunderbolt (1945), written for FMPU, but not released to general public until 1947
- C-Man (1949), including the song Do It Now, written with Larry Neill.
- Gerald McBoing-Boing (1950 UAP cartoon based on a story by Dr. Seuss); Kubik composed also a longer version which is sometimes performed as a narrated concert piece with Dr. Seuss's text
- The Miner's Daughter (1950), a UAP cartoon short
- Two Gals and a Guy (1951, aka Baby and Me) (incidental music, also served as musical director)
- Transatlantico: Una corsa attraversa la storia (1952), often titled Transatlantic: A Short Cut Through History, score for a Philip Stapp cartoon that was a Marshall Plan film
- The Desperate Hours (1955). Additional music by Daniele Amfitheatrof (uncredited)
- "The Silent Sentinel" and "Hiroshima", episodes of The 20th Century. (1958)
- I Thank a Fool (1962) This score was later replaced by Ron Goodwin
- Leopold the See-Through Crumbpicker (1969), a Gene Deitch animation of a James Flora book. The music was ultlimately not used for the score, but repurposed into his Divertimento III.
- The Eisenhower Years (1970), produced by Kansas State University for National Educational Radio, incorporates music previously composed for The Silent Sentinel
- Music for Bells
