= The World at War (film) =

1942 film by Lowell Mellett

- Directed by: Lowell Mellett
- Written by: Sam Spewack
- Produced by: Office of War Information
- Narrated by: Paul Stewart
- Edited by: Gene Milford
- Music by: Gail Kubik
- Distributed by: War Activities Committee of the Motion Picture Industry
- Release date: September 18, 1942
- Running time: 66 minutes
- Country: United States
- Language: English

The World at War is a 1942 documentary film produced by the Office of War Information's Bureau of Motion Pictures. One of the earliest feature length films made by the United States government during the war, it attempted to explain the large picture of why the United States was at war, and the various causes and circumstances which brought the war into being.

The documentary opens with visuals of the attack on Pearl Harbor and its immediate aftermath. It then traces the previous decade of American involvement in the war, including Kuhn's address at the German-American Bund, speeches by isolationist U.S. Senators Nye and Wheeler, Japan's invasion of China, Italy's war on Ethiopia, Hitler's Anschluss, the Spanish Civil War, the Munich Agreement, the partition of Czechoslovakia, and the invasion of Poland. In covering the outbreak of total war, the film uses footage from Nazi propaganda films Feldzug in Polen and Sieg im Westen.

It was a precursor to the better known six-part Why We Fight propaganda film series directed by Frank Capra.

== See also ==
- List of Allied propaganda films of World War II
