= Jean Eichelberger Ivey =

American composer (1923–2010)

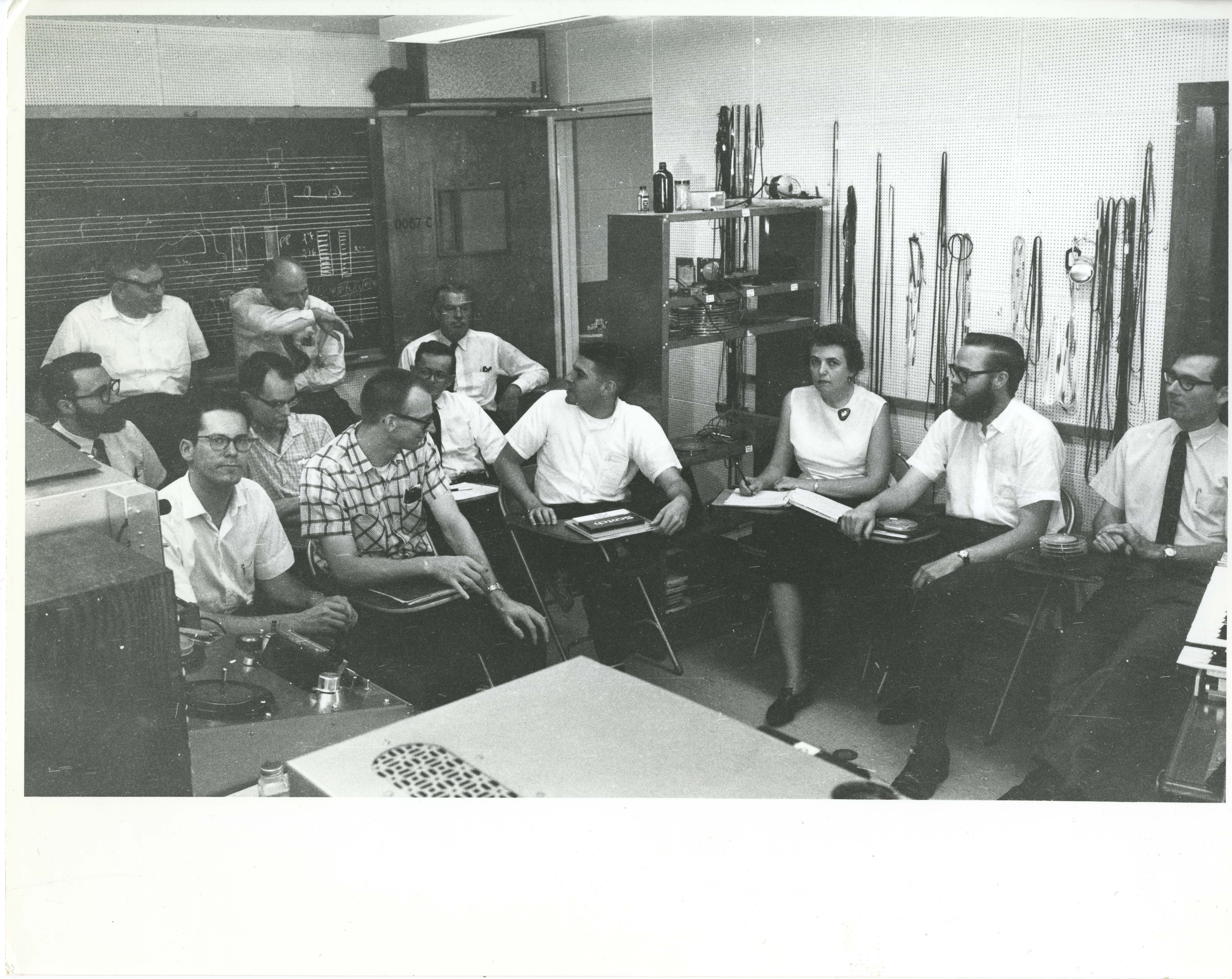
Jean Eichelberger Ivey is seated in the front row third from the right; she is the sole woman in the seminar.

Jean Eichelberger Ivey (July 3, 1923 – May 2, 2010) was an American composer who produced an extensive and diverse catalog of solo, chamber, vocal, and orchestral works as an innovator and "respected electronic composer."

== Early life and education ==
Born in 1923 to Joseph S. Eichelberger and Mary Elizabeth Pfeiffer, Jean B. Eichelberger Ivey attended high school at the Academy of Notre Dame in Washington, D.C. Though her childhood was impacted by the Great Depression and her father's loss of his job as editor of the anti-feminist serial The Woman Patriot, Jean Eichelberger won a full-tuition scholarship at Trinity College in Washington, D.C. where she graduated magna cum laude with her bachelor's degree in 1944. Subsequently, she earned master's degrees in piano performance from Peabody Conservatory and composition from the Eastman School of Music where she studied under Wayne Barlow, Kent Kennan, and Bernard Rogers. In the late 1940s and throughout the 1950s she taught at Trinity College (1945-1955), the Peabody Conservatory (1946), and the Catholic University of America (1952-1955), and College Misericordia (1955-1957). From 1960 to 1962 she taught at Xavier University in New Orleans. In 1964 she began a Doctor of Musical Arts program in composition, including studies in electronic music, at the University of Toronto and completed the degree in 1972. She served as the editor of the American Society of University Composers newsletter from its founding in January 1968 until summer 1970.

== Peabody ==
She founded the Peabody Electronic Music Studio in 1967, and taught composition and electronic music at the Peabody Conservatory of Music until her retirement. Works composed by Ivey and her students within the studio's first full season were presented at New York's Carnegie Recital Hall, around Peabody, and on radio and television. Most of her electronics works are composed for mixed mediums including acoustic instruments and voice. At the Peabody Conservatory Summer Session, Ivey presented a workshop on electronic music, using her own tape recorders and borrowed equipment, for an audience of school music teachers. She then persuaded the Conservatory to purchase its own equipment and launch the Peabody Electronic Music Studio in 1969, the first such studio at a conservatory. Ivey directed the studio (later renamed the Computer Music Studio) and the computer music composition program at Peabody until her retirement in 1997, earning tenure in 1976 and serving as an adviser to dozens of composers over the years. The Baltimore Symphony premiered two of her works which combine tape with orchestra, and her music has been recorded on the CRI, Folkways and Grenadilla labels. Her publishers include Boosey and Hawkes, Carl Fischer, Inc. and E.C. Schirmer.

== Achievement ==
Ivey is listed in the New Grove Dictionary of Music and Who's Who in America. She is also the subject of a half-hour documentary film prepared in Washington: A Woman Is... a Composer. Her awards include a Guggenheim fellowship, two fellowships from the National Endowment for the Arts, annual ASCAP awards since 1972, the Peabody Director's Recognition Award, and the Peabody Distinguished Alumni Award.

On her compositional ideals, Ivey wrote: "I consider all the musical resources of the past and present as being at the composer's disposal, but always in the service of the effective communication of humanistic ideas and intuitive emotion."

== Influence ==
While pursuing her doctoral studies at University of Toronto, she studied electronic music under Myron Schaeffer and Hugh Le Caine. Composing and conducting are two of the last male bastions, though women are steadily making inroads into these fields. Jean Eichelberger Ivey battled this prejudice not only in the field of music but also in academia where women were less likely to be awarded tenure, foundation grants, performance opportunities, and commercial recordings. [4]

== Compositions ==
Chamber Music

Androcles and the Lion

Dinsmoor Suite

Music for Viola and Piano

Ode for Violin and Piano

Pantomime

Scherzo for Wind Septet

Six Inventions for Two Violins

Sonatina for Unaccompanied Clarinet

Song of Pan

String Quartet

Suite for Cello and Piano

Tonado

Triton’s Horn

Electronic Music (Tape Only):

Continuous Form

Cortege – For Charles Kent

Enter Three Witches

Pinball

Theater Piece

Live Performers Plus Tape:

Aldebaran

Hera, Hung from the Sky

Prospero

Sea-Change

Skaniadaryo

Terminus

Testament of Eve

Three Songs of Night

Music for Theater, Films, and Television:

Androcles and the Lion

Continuous Form

The Exception and the Rule

Montage IV: The Garden of Eden

Montage V: How to Play Pinball

Documentary film on Jean Eichelberger Ivey

Orchestra Music:

Festive Symphony

Forms in Motion

Little Symphony

Ode for Orchestra

Overture for Small Orchestra

Passacaglia for Chamber Orchestra

Sea-Change

Testament of Eve

Tribute: Martin Luther King

Piano Music (Artist Level):

Prelude and Passacaglia

Skaniadaryo (Piano and Tape)

Sonata for Piano

Theme and Variations

Piano Music (Teaching Pieces):

Magic Circles

Modal Melodies (7)

Parade (Duet)

Pentatonic Sketches (5)

Sleepy Time

Tiny Twelve-Tone Tunes (5)

Water Wheel

Vocal and Choral Music:

Absent in the Spring

Ave Verum, see Lord, Hear My Prayer

The Birthmark

A Carol of Animals

Crossing Brooklyn Ferry

Hera, Hung from the Sky

Iliad, see Two Songs for High Voice, Flute or Clarinet, and Piano

Lord, Hear My Prayer

Morning Song

Night Voyage, see Two Songs for High Voice, Flute or Clarinet, and Piano

Notes Toward Time

O Come, Bless the Lord

Panis Angelicus, see O Come, Bless the Lord

Prospero

Solstice

Terminus

Testament of Eve

Three Songs of Night

Tribute: Martin Luther King

Two Songs for High Voice, Flute or Clarinet, and Piano

Woman’s Love

== Other ==
She met and married Fred Ivey, an American living in Germany. Their marriage ended in divorce in 1974. [5] Ivey died on May 2, 2010, in Baltimore, Maryland.

Pinball (Folkways records FMS 3/3436) Hera, Hung from the Sky combines taped and live performances and inspired by poem by Carolyn Kizer (Composers Recording, Inc. CRI-SD 325, Garden [1961]), Testament of Eve (1974).[6]

Her many notable composition students include Michael Hedges, Carlos Sanchez-Gutierrez, Geoffrey Dorian Wright, Richard Dudas, McGregor Boyle, Vivian Adelberg Rudow, Lynn F. Kowal and Daniel Crozier.
