= Gillian Lind =

British actress (1904–1983)

- Born: 25 August 1904; British India
- Died: 25 October 1983 (aged 79); Lewes, East Sussex, United Kingdom
- Occupation: Actress
- Years active: 1932-1974 (film & TV)

Gillian Lind (25 August 1904 – 25 October 1983) was a British stage, film and television actress. In 1930 she starred in Edgar Wallace's play On the Spot in the West End. In 1936 she was in the play Green Waters by Max Catto. She went on to enjoy a long career in film and television. Initially appearing onscreen as a female lead, she later transitioned into character roles. In 1957 she appeared in the BBC Dickens adaptation Nicholas Nickleby as the protagonist's mother. She featured on the 1964 series Ann Veronica based on a novel by H. G. Wells.

She was married to the actor Cyril Raymond.

== Selected filmography ==
- Condemned to Death (1932)
- Dick Turpin (1933)
- The Man Outside (1933)
- Open All Night (1934)
- Death Croons the Blues (1937)
- The Oracle (1953)
- The Heart of the Matter (1953)
- Aunt Clara (1954)
- Don't Talk to Strange Men (1962)
- Fear in the Night (1972)
- And Now the Screaming Starts! (1973)

== Selected stage credits ==
- Alibi (1928)
- On the Spot (1930)
- Clive of India (1934)
- Green Waters (1936)
- Towards Zero (1956)

== Bibliography ==
- Kabatchnik, Amnon. Blood on the Stage, 1975-2000: Milestone Plays of Crime, Mystery, and Detection : an Annotated Repertoire. Rowman & Littlefield, 2012.
