= Daughter of Darkness (1948 film) =

1948 British film by Lance Comfort

- Directed by: Lance Comfort
- Written by: Max Catto
- Based on: They Walk Alone by Max Catto
- Produced by: Victor Hanbury
- Starring: Anne Crawford; Maxwell Reed; Siobhán McKenna
- Cinematography: Stanley Pavey
- Edited by: Lito Carruthers
- Music by: Clifton Parker
- Production companies: Victor Hanbury Productions (in association with) (as Kenilworth); Alliance Productions Ltd.
- Distributed by: Paramount British Pictures (UK)
- Release dates: 23 January 1948 (London); 8 March 1948 (UK); 26 December 1956 (US)
- Running time: 91 minutes
- Country: United Kingdom
- Language: English
- Budget: £200,000

Daughter of Darkness is a 1948 British Gothic horror film directed by Lance Comfort and starring Anne Crawford, Maxwell Reed and Siobhán McKenna. It was written by Max Katto based on his 1938 play They Walk Alone. It was shot at Riverside Studios, Hammersmith, London, (known at that time as Alliance Studios) and on location. McKenna was offered a Hollywood contract following her performance, but heeded the counsel of Laurence Olivier to remain in theatre work.

== Plot ==
In the small Irish town of Ballyconnen, Emmy Baudine is a beautiful but disturbed young woman who works for the local priest. When the fair comes to town, she encounters Dan, a handsome young boxer – and lays his face open with her fingernails when he attempts to seduce her. Urged by the village women's jealousy and forebodings, Father Corcoran, reluctantly sends Emmy to friends, farming family, in Yorkshire, and Emmy endeavours to suppress the strange feelings of fascination and revulsion that she experiences in the presence of the opposite sex. But the fair's seeping, relentless prowl for profit, has already left Ireland, and is trundling its poisoned way through the arteries of Britain, seemingly knowing where its next victims live. Their next meeting cannot be resisted; nor can the allure of Emmy Baudine: to wherever she moves.

== Cast ==
- Anne Crawford as Bess Stanforth
- Maxwell Reed as Dan
- Siobhán McKenna as Emmy Baudine
- George Thorpe as Tallent
- Barry Morse as Robert Stanforth
- Liam Redmond as Father Cocoran
- Cyril Smith as Joe
- Honor Blackman as Julie Tallent
- Denis Gordon as Saul Trevethick
- Grant Tyler as Larry Tallent
- Norman Shelley as Smithers
- George Merritt as Constable
- Iris Vandeleur as Mrs. Smithers
- Ann Clery as Miss Foley
- Arthur Hambling as Jacob
- David Greene as David Price

== Release ==
The film was remastered in 2K from the original camera negative in 2026 for release on Blu-ray by Hammer Films in February 2027 under their Hammer Presents label (which gives rare films not made by Hammer a chance to be restored and re-released).

== Critical reception ==
The Monthly Film Bulletin wrote: "It is a pity that Siobhan McKenna's first major appearance on the screen should be in so undistinguished a piece of filmmaking. Yet with all the limitations of the part, her performance as Emmy makes a vivid impression. She certainly can act, which is more than can be said for some of her companions on the farm."

Variety wrote: "Max Canto's play, They Walk Alone, produced in 1938, dealt with an unusual and difficult subject, a homicidal nymphomaniac. It took courage to attempt a screen version, but all concerned have come out with flying colors. The playwright converted his original work into a good script, and producer Victor Hanbury and director Lance Comfort have turned out a firstrate adult picture. Picture grips from the first moment and holds throughout."

The Radio Times wrote, "an opportunity to see McKenna, one of the most compelling of Irish stage actresses, portraying a maniac with full-blooded commitment."

TV Guide noted, "strong stuff for 1948."

In his Guide to British Cinema, Geoff Mayer writes, "Daughter of Darkness, with a budget of two hundred thousand pounds and three weeks of location shooting in Cornwall, was not a financial success and represented a setback to Comfort's career, which saw him relegated to low-budget films in the 1950s and 1960s. Yet the film's mixture of gothic and horror establishes it as one of the most startling British films of the 1940s."
