= Lewis Nielson =

American composer (born 1950)

- Born: September 26, 1950; Washington, D.C., U.S.
- Education: University of Iowa
- Occupation: Musical composer
- Years active: 1977–present

Lewis Nielson (born 1950) is an American composer. Until 2012, he served as chair of the composition department at Oberlin Conservatory of Music.

== Early life and education ==
Nielson spent his childhood in Washington, D.C., but moved with his family to London at age 9. He studied at the Royal Academy of Music in London, Clark University in Massachusetts, and the University of Iowa, where he received his Ph.D. in music theory and composition in 1977. During his youth, Nielson played guitar in a garage rock band.

== Career ==
He served as a professor of music composition for 21 years at the University of Georgia while directing the University of Georgia Contemporary Chamber Ensemble. His works have been performed by the Prague Radio Symphony Orchestra, the Moscow Radio Symphony Orchestra, the Slovak Orchestra of Bratislava, the Musique Expérimentale de Bourges, and the American Composer's Orchestra at such venues as the Moscow International House of Music, the Smithsonian Institution and the National Gallery of Art and at a number of international events including the World Saxophone Congress, the American Society of University Composers and the Society of Composers, and I Seminario Nacional Pesquisa em Performance Musical in Brazil.

He has received a Fulbright-Hays Grant from the French government, the National Endowment for the Arts, the Ibla Foundation in Sicily and the International Society of Bassists. In 2000, he joined the faculty at Oberlin Conservatory.

Nielson won honorable mention in the International Society of Bassists’ Composition Competition 2000 for his Duo Concertant (Danger Man), a work for double bass and percussion.

== Discography ==
• Lewis Nielson: Axis (Mode Records, 2015)

• Lewis Nielson: The Twittering Machine: Ecritures (Centaur Records, 2008)

• Vortex: Music by Lewis Nielson (ACA Digital, 2000)
