= Punch without Judy =

1939 play

- Poster for a wartime repertory performance
- Written by: Max Catto
- Original language: English
- Genre: Comedy
- Setting: Bloomsbury, present day

Premiere
- Date premiered: 12 June 1939
- Place premiered: Q Theatre, London

Punch without Judy is a 1939 comedy play by the British author Max Catto. After its première at the Q Theatre in Kew Bridge, London, it transferred to New Theatre in the West End where it ran for 33 performances between 5 December and 30 December 1939. The West End cast included Peter Murray Hill, Henry Kendall, Ernest Jay, Basil Langton, Marjorie Rhodes, Elizabeth Allan and Olga Edwardes. The plot was revolved around romance between students living Bloomsbury. The same year the author's successful thriller They Walk Alone had also appeared in the West End.

Phyllis Calvert appeared at Q Theatre in the role subsequently played by Elizabeth Allan in the West End. Calvert met her future husband, co-star Peter Murray Hill, during the production and was spotted by Gainsborough Pictures who signed her to a contract.

== Bibliography ==
- James, Godfrey. London, the Western Reaches. Hale, 1950.
- Wearing, J. P. The London Stage 1930–1939: A Calendar of Productions, Performers, and Personnel. Rowman & Littlefield, 2014.
