= The Happy Family (1936 film) =

1936 film

- Hugh Williams and Leonora Corbett in the film
- Directed by: Maclean Rogers
- Screenplay by: Maclean Rogers
- Story by: Max Catto
- Based on: French Salad by Max Catto
- Produced by: Herbert Smith
- Starring: Hugh Williams; Leonora Corbett
- Cinematography: George Stretton
- Production company: British Lion Film Corporation
- Distributed by: British Lion Film Corporation
- Release date: 10 August 1936
- Running time: 67 minutes
- Country: Great Britain
- Language: English

The Happy Family (also known as French Salad) is a 1936 British comedy film directed by Maclean Rogers and starring Hugh Williams, Leonora Corbett and Max Adrian. It was written by Rogers based on the 1934 play French Salad by Max Catto, and was shot at Beaconsfield Studios with sets were designed by the art director Norman G. Arnold. It was made as a quota quickie.

== Preservation status ==
The British Film Institute National Archive holds a collection of ephemera and stills but no film or video materials.

== Synopsis ==
A mother and father who, in order to shock their extended family out of their idle, spendthrift ways, pretend to have lost all their money.

== Cast ==
- Hugh Williams as Victor Hutt
- Leonora Corbett as Barbara Hutt
- Max Adrian as Noel Hutt
- Maidie Hope as Mrs Hutt
- Eve Gray as Nia Harrison
- Ellen Pollock as Leo Hutt
- Glennis Lorimer as Robina Hutt
- D. A. Clarke-Smith as Mr Harrison
- Dick Francis as Mr Hutt
- Muriel George as housekeeper

== Reception ==
The Monthly Film Bulletin wrote: "This is a jolly, fairly fast film. ... The serious side of the story, Victor falling in love with another woman and so on, is rather weak, but there is not much of it. The acting and production values are adequate."

The Daily Film Renter wrote: "Story values are slender, but development is uproariously funny, much hilarity springing from lunatic antics of crazy household comprising peculiar types. Slick direction, brilliant cutting, high-class technical qualities."

Picture Show wrote: "This comedy-drama is based on the well-worn theme of the harassed father of a lazy family pretending to go broke in order to bring them to their senses. He actually does go broke at the end, but by this time the pretence has achieved its ends, so he doesn't have to worry much about it. ... Competent acting."
