= Wymond =

Wymond is a surname. Notable people with the surname include:

- Gilbert O. Wymond Jr.
- Robert Wymond (by 1508–1549), English politician
