= C-Man (film) =

1949 film by Joseph Lerner

- Theatrical release poster
- Directed by: Joseph Lerner
- Screenplay by: Berne Giler
- Produced by: Irving Lerner; Joseph Lerner
- Starring: Dean Jagger; John Carradine; Lottie Elwen; Rene Paul
- Narrated by: Dean Jagger
- Cinematography: Gerald Hirschfeld
- Edited by: Geraldine Lerner
- Music by: Gail Kubik
- Production company: Laurel Films Production
- Distributed by: Film Classics
- Release date: May 27, 1949 (New York City)
- Running time: 77 minutes
- Country: United States
- Language: English

C-Man is a 1949 American film noir directed by Joseph Lerner featuring Dean Jagger, John Carradine, Lottie Elwen and Rene Paul. Gail Kubik based his Pulitzer Prize winning Symphony Concertante on his score for C-Man.

== Plot ==
U.S. Customs Department Agent Cliff Holden's (Dean Jagger) childhood best friend and boss is murdered while chasing down jewel thieves. He's assigned to find the thieves and solve the murder. The plan is for him to fly to Europe, then catch the same return flight suspect Matty Royal (Rene Paul) will be taking.

== Cast ==
- Dean Jagger as Cliff Holden, alias William Harrah
- John Carradine as Doc Spencer
- Lottie Elwen as Kathe van Bourne
- Rene Paul as Matty Royal
- Walter Vaughan as Customs Inspector Brandon
- Adelaide Klein as Minnie Hoffman
- Edith Atwater as Lydia Brundage
- Harry Landers as Owney Shor
- Jean Ellyn as Birdie Alton
- Walter Brooke as Joe

== Reception ==
=== Critical response ===
The film critic for The New York Times, panned the film when it was first released, writing, "According to yesterday's newcomer at the Rialto, C-Man, the Treasury Department's typical customs agent is a suave, amiable sleuth who takes knives, pistols and slugging in stride and roguishly admits that it's all in a day's work. Well and good, but we'll wager that most C-Men are a lot smarter than Dean Jagger ... Miss Elwen and newcomer Harry Landers, a juvenile Richard Widmark, try hard, but most of the actors perk up only at the prospect of another chase. And in view of the material they had to work with, the Treasury Department will probably forgive them."

More recently, film critic Dennis Schwartz gave the film a mixed review. He wrote, "A lively crime fighting programmer featuring a Custom Agent tracking down a jewel thief and a murderer. It was good on the action part, but there was not much brain-work put into the story and no feel for the characters. It was a routine B-film done on a modest budget in a quasi-documentary style and in a flat black-and-white tone, with nothing much to recommend it except for its atmospheric treatment of New York City and by using authentic locations ... The film didn't make much sense, but it was watchable."

== See also ==
- List of films in the public domain in the United States
