= The Flanagan Boy =

1953 film by Reginald LeBorg

- Theatrical release poster
- Directed by: Reginald LeBorg
- Screenplay by: Guy Elmes; Richard H. Landau
- Based on: The Flanagan Boy by Max Catto
- Produced by: Anthony Hinds
- Starring: Barbara Payton; Frederick Valk; Tony Wright; Sid James
- Cinematography: Walter J. Harvey; Len Harris
- Edited by: James Needs
- Music by: Ivor Slaney
- Production company: Hammer Film Productions
- Distributed by: Exclusive Films (UK); Lippert Pictures (US)
- Release dates: 10 April 1953 (United States); July 1953 (United Kingdom)
- Running time: 81 minutes
- Country: United Kingdom
- Language: English

The Flanagan Boy (released in the United States as Bad Blonde) is a 1953 British second feature ('B') film noir adapted from the 1949 novel of the same name by Max Catto.. Produced by Hammer Film Productions, The Flanagan Boy was directed by Reginald LeBorg from a screenplay by Guy Elmes and Richard H. Landau. The film stars Barbara Payton, Tony Wright, Frederick Valk and Sid James.

== Plot ==
In England, at a carnival boxing tournament, Johnny Flanagan jumps into the ring to challenge one of the professionals. Johnny wins the fight, and he and his trainer, Charlie Sullivan, collect his winnings from Charlie's old friend Sharkey. At a local tavern, Sharkey advises that Johnny should meet with Giuseppe Vecchi, an influential boxing promoter. Sharkey and Johnny meet with him where Johnny also meets with Lorna, Giuseppe's wife and a former taxi dancer. Lorna is unimpressed with Johnny, who then vows to win the next fairground booth fight.

Johnny wins the fairground fight and Lorna becomes smitten with him. As Johnny rests from the fight, Giuseppe decides to become Johnny's promoter. He invites Johnny, Sharkey, and Charlie to his countryside estate in Stratford-on-Avon. While Giuseppe intends for everyone to be "one big happy family", Johnny and Lorna do not get along. To ease the situation, Giuseppe invites Johnny to a birthday celebration for Lorna at a nightclub. There, he insists that she and Johnny dance together. Lorna and Johnny become attached as they dance and settle their differences.

Later that night, as Giuseppe returns home drunk, Lorna and Johnny kiss outside while Sharkey watches from the window. For the next few days, Johnny struggles in his training while he continues a passionate affair with Lorna. After dinner, a conflicted Johnny decides to break up with Lorna. However, Lorna confesses her love towards him. When Johnny refuses her love, Lorna attempts suicide but he saves her.

The next morning, Sharkey forbids Lorna from seeing Johnny as he prepares for his next boxing match in London. Before the fight, Johnny receives a telephone call from Lorna telling him she is pregnant. During the match, Johnny holds his own until Lorna arrives. Distracted, Johnny collapses and loses the fight. Giuseppe is disappointed but nevertheless, he allows for Johnny and the others to stay at his estate. Johnny promises to win his next fight and after he steps out, he meets with Lorna again. She suggests they should kill Giuseppe but Johnny refuses.

Back at the estate, when Johnny learns his next fight is in Scotland, Lorna tells Giuseppe she is pregnant. Giuseppe is overjoyed at the news and gets drunk. Johnny confronts her outside, where Lorna reveals she plans to poison her husband. Despite some reservations, Johnny is persuaded to murder Giuseppe. The next day, Johnny pretends to go for a bicycle ride until he swims into the lake, hides under the tarp on Giuseppe's boat, and drowns him while he is fishing.

Sharkey and Charlie immediately report Giuseppe's death to the police. A police inspector questions everyone's whereabouts, including Johnny who establishes his alibi. Shortly after, Giuseppe's mother Mother Vecchi and his sister Mrs. Correlli arrive from Italy for the funeral. The court later rules Giuseppe's death was an accidental drowning.

Before Giuseppe's family leave, Mother Vecchi states she knows Lorna is not pregnant. Feeling guilt-ridden, Johnny tells Lorna he is going to confess what they did to the police. Lorna tries to convince him otherwise and admits she was never pregnant. Johnny tells her to leave and remains in his room. Before she steps out, Lorna hands Sharkey a bowl of soup to feed Johnny. Hours later, Sharkey and Charlie find Johnny dead, and his body positioned to appear like a suicide. Sharkey knows Lorna poisoned Johnny and takes revenge by turning her over to the police.

Sharkey and Charlie return to holding carnival boxing tournaments.

== Cast ==
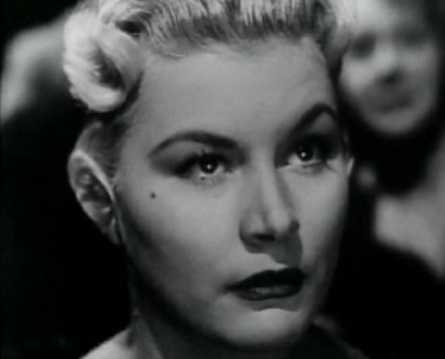
Barbara Payton in the film

- Tony Wright as Johnny Flanagan
- Barbara Payton as Lorna Vecchi
- Frederick Valk as Giuseppe Vecchi
- John Slater as Charlie Sullivan
- Sid James as Sharkey
- Marie Burke as Mother Vecchi
- Selma Vaz Dias as Mrs. Corelli, Vecchi's sister
- Enzo Coticchia as Mr. Corelli

== Production ==
The Flanagan Boy was the screen debut for Tony Wright. He was convincing as a fighter, having been an amateur boxer in the British Navy and receiving coaching from Len Harvey, a former British heavyweight.

Filming began on September 25, 1952 and finished on October 19. A sneak preview was held in the UK on June 20, 1953. The film was released first in the United States on April 10, 1953 (retitled as Bad Blonde) and later in the UK in July 1953.

== Reception ==
In a contemporary review, Kine Weekly wrote: "Exuberant murder melodrama, containing prominent sex overtones and a fight racket fringe. ... Elegant and apposite settings appropriately complete the rugged mixture of fisticuffs, romance and crime. A meaty dish, it's bound to go down with the crowd."

The Monthly Film Bulletin wrote: "A lurid little melodrama, with toughly realistic portraits of boxing world characters, a solid performance by Frederick Valk as Vecchi, and Barbara Payton as a flashy sex-menace. Made in England by an American director, the film copies American 'B' models quite competently and unpleasantly."

Variety wrote: "Lower-grade dualler toplining Barbara Payton. ... Footage is a hodge-podge of trite melodrama, unbelievable dialog and poor thesping."

In the book British Sound Films: The Studio Years 1928–1959, David Quinlan rated the film as "average", writing: "Lurid stuff, quite strongly made."

Leslie Halliwell called the film: "Competent British imitation of an American B movie."

== Retrospective appraisal ==
The Bad Blonde/Flanagan Boy's low-budget pedigree is evident, and attributable to Hammer studio's "draconian cost-consciousness," according film historian Wheeler W. Dixon. Terming the film "a routine tale of murder and romantic betrayal" he adds:

The film might have been an interesting but obvious thriller, but was overlong, even at eighty minutes, and seems static and stagebound throughout its running time.

Dixon merits Sid James, famous for his Carry On material, as "easily the best thing about the film."

== See also ==
- List of boxing films
