= Dangerous to Know =

1938 film by Robert Florey

- Directed by: Robert Florey
- Screenplay by: William R. Lipman; Horace McCoy
- Based on: On the Spot by Edgar Wallace
- Starring: Anna May Wong; Akim Tamiroff; Gail Patrick
- Cinematography: Theodor Sparkuhl
- Edited by: Arthur P. Schmidt
- Color process: Black and white
- Production company: Paramount Pictures
- Distributed by: Paramount Pictures
- Release dates: March 9, 1938 (Los Angeles); March 10, 1938 (New York)
- Running time: 70 minutes
- Country: United States
- Language: English

Dangerous to Know is a 1938 American crime film directed by Robert Florey and starring Anna May Wong, Akim Tamiroff and Gail Patrick. The screenplay is based on British crime writer Edgar Wallace's hit 1930 play On the Spot, which had been inspired by the career of Al Capone. Wong reprised her stage role from the New York production in the film. The supporting cast features Lloyd Nolan and Anthony Quinn.

== Plot ==
Former bootlegger Stephen Recka is a powerful figure in city politics and business circles, with the mayor and bank in his pocket, and he aspires to climb socially. Recka discovers that a city councilor who wants to become mayor has planted spy John Rance in his office.

Recka's birthday party is organized by his hostess Madame Lan Ying, with attendees who want a share in his citywide power. Margaret van Case, a member of a prominent family, arrives and Recka charms her, displeasing Lan Ying.

Recka visits Rance's apartment, forces him to write a suicide note and causes him to falls to his death from the window. Police inspector Brandon pursues Recka for eight murders, but with no evidence to convict him.

Recka orders the mayor to change the city's development plans to avoid the district around Margaret's house as part of his plan to ingratiate himself with her. After Recka learns that Margaret's boyfriend Phil Easton is a bond salesman, and he buys $20,000 of bonds from him and gradually sends him business to win his trust. Recka pursues Margaret, but Lan Ying warns him that she is out of his league.

Recka's hoods steal $218,000 in bonds from Phil at gunpoint and kidnap him so that it appears that he has stolen them. The police Phil drunk and with the bonds missing. Margaret realizes that Phil has been framed, and Recka tells her that he will clear Phil only if she marries him, opening the doors of respectable society for him. She agrees but vows eternal contempt for Recka, and Phil is freed on bail.

Recka's hoods double-cross him and take the bonds, but they are arrested by the police for speeding. Recka realizes that Phil could identify them and therefore must be silenced. He buys plane tickets for Margaret to fly away with him, but when he finds that the bonds have been switched for newspaper, he knows that Inspector Brandon must have them.

Lan Ying understands Recka's plans and that he intends to kill Phil, but his henchman is arrested before he can complete the hit. She also knows about the plane tickets and warns Recka that she will not be waiting if he returns. She bids an emotional farewell to Recka, playing a record of "Thanks for the Memory". Confused and lonely, he admits that she is a real friend and the only person whom he can trust.

As Recka plays the organ, Lan Ying approaches him from behind with a knife but then plunges the knife into herself. Brandon catches Recka holding the bloody knife over Lan Ying's body and arrests Recka, knowing that he did not kill Lan Ying but intending that Recka will be convicted for the murder nonetheless and pay the price for all of the crimes for which he was never tried.

Margaret and Phil fly to their honeymoon using the plane tickets.

== Cast ==
- Anna May Wong as Madame Lan Ying
- Akim Tamiroff as Stephen Recka
- Gail Patrick as Margaret van Case
- Lloyd Nolan as Inspector Brandon
- Harvey Stephens as Phillip Easton
- Anthony Quinn as Nicky Kusnoff
- Roscoe Karns as Duncan
- Porter Hall as Mayor Bradley
- Barlowe Borland as Butler
- Hedda Hopper as Mrs. Carson
- Hugh Sothern as Harvey Gregson
- Edward Pawley as John Rance
- Eddie Marr as Crouch
- Harry Worth as Hanley
- Robert Brister as Councilman Murkil
- Pierre Watkin as Senator Carson

== Reception ==
In a contemporary review for The New York Times, critic Bosley Crowther called the film a "second-rate melodrama, hardly worthy of the talents of its generally capable cast."

Reviewer Mae Tinée of the Chicago Tribune wrote: "The story? A melodramatic one. Better than some of its class, not so good as others. But engrossing screen fare because of the acting. ... If you like stories about racketeers 'Dangerous to Know' is a film to jot down on that movie shopping list."
