= Green Waters =

1936 play

- Written by: Max Catto
- Original language: English
- Genre: Drama
- Setting: A village in the west of Scotland

Premiere
- Date premiered: 25 May 1936
- Place premiered: Vaudeville Theatre, London

Green Waters is a 1936 play by the British author Max Catto. It ran for 80 performances at the Vaudeville Theatre in London's West End between 25 May and 1 August 1936. The West End cast included Sebastian Shaw, Wilfred Walter, Morland Graham, Torin Thatcher, Marie Ault and Gillian Lind. It also appeared at the Masque Theatre on Broadway.

== Bibliography ==
- Bordman, Gerald. American Theatre: A Chronicle of Comedy and Drama, 1930-1969. Oxford University Press, 1996.
- Wearing, J. P. The London Stage 1930–1939: A Calendar of Productions, Performers, and Personnel. Rowman & Littlefield, 2014.
