= A Prize of Gold =

1955 film by Mark Robson, Max Catto

- Theatrical poster
- Directed by: Mark Robson
- Written by: Robert Buckner; John Paxton
- Based on: A Prize of Gold; 1953 novel by Max Catto
- Produced by: Phil C. Samuel
- Starring: Richard Widmark; Mai Zetterling; Nigel Patrick; George Cole
- Cinematography: Ted Moore
- Edited by: William Lewthwaite
- Music by: Malcolm Arnold
- Production company: Warwick Films
- Distributed by: Columbia Pictures
- Release date: 14 October 1955
- Running time: 98 minutes
- Country: United Kingdom
- Language: English
- Budget: $1 million (est)

A Prize of Gold is a 1955 British Technicolor film noir crime film directed by Mark Robson partly filmed in West Berlin. The film stars Richard Widmark as a United States Air Force Air Police Master Sergeant motivated by love and compassion to begin a life of crime. It was based on the 1953 novel of the same title by Max Catto.

== Plot ==
Master Sergeant Joe Lawrence (Richard Widmark) is stationed in occupied Berlin shortly after the end of World War II. He encounters a group of German orphans when one of them tries to steal his Jeep. Joe finds Maria (Mai Zetterling), one of the orphans' caretakers, very attractive. Maria is trying to take the children to Brazil, where they can start life anew. It is being arranged by her employer, Hans Fischer, a very successful German contractor. Hans tells Joe not to return. After thinking it over, Joe disregards him and soon falls in love with Maria. Maria breaks up with Joe, but Joe persists. When he sees Maria returning home and reluctantly submitting to her boss's kisses, he fights with Hans, ending Hans's assistance with the travel arrangements.

His buddy, British Military Police Sergeant Roger Morris (George Cole), has hinted about stealing part of a fortune in a recently discovered Reichsbank gold bullion being transferred to England via military transport in a series of four shipments. Joe plans a daring hijacking of the airplane, aided greatly by the fact that he works for the Air Provost Marshal, who shares the security responsibility for the shipments with the British. Roger's uncle Dan puts them in touch with Alfie Stratton, a semi-retired crook who can dispose of the gold. Alfie insists that they use ex-RAF pilot Brian Hammell (Nigel Patrick), to protect his interests.

The plan works up to a point. They hijack the C-47 and land at an abandoned airstrip in England. However, the crew manage to retake control of the airplane after only part of the bullion has been unloaded, and try to take off, only to crash into Alfie's car (used to light the runway) and burn. After the gang leave, the crewmen manage to get out unobserved.

Thinking they have killed three men, Joe decides to return the gold and turn himself in. Roger and Dan agree. Alfie is regretting getting back into a life of crime, so Joe has no trouble letting him out, in exchange for £5000 to be given to Dan. Brian, who shot at the escaping aircraft and has no qualms against murder, is the only obstacle. Alfie and Dan leave. When Brian wakes up, he does not like the new arrangement. In the ensuing fight, Roger falls to his death and Joe is knocked out. Joe comes to and chases Brian. In his desperation to get away (with a few gold bars), Brian ends up clinging to the edge of a rising drawbridge, finally losing his grip and plummeting into the water far below.

When Joe is brought back to Berlin for his court-martial, he sees Maria and the orphans leaving for Brazil.

== Cast ==
- Richard Widmark as Sergeant Joe Lawrence
- Mai Zetterling as Maria
- Nigel Patrick as Brian Hammell
- George Cole as Sergeant Roger Morris
- Donald Wolfit as Alfie Stratton
- Joseph Tomelty as Uncle Dan Watson
- Andrew Ray as Conrad
- Karel Stepanek as Dr. Zachmann
- Robert Ayres as Tex
- Eric Pohlmann as Fischer
- Olive Sloane as Mavis
- Alan Gifford as Major Bracken
- Ivan Craig as British Major
- Harry Towb as Benny
- Sam Kydd as Milkman

Joan Regan sings the title song.

== Production ==
Warwick bought film rights to the novel in April 1953 and originally announced they wanted Montgomery Clift for the lead. R.C. Sheriff was assigned the screenplay and Mark Robson, who had just made Hell Below Zero for Warwick, was to direct. Alan Ladd had made three films for Warwick and he was in discussions to play the lead as well.

The movie was part of a new three-picture deal Warwick signed with Columbia (the others being The Cockleshell Heroes and Safari.) John Paxton was brought in to rewrite Sheriff's script. In early 1954 Richard Widmark signed to star opposite Nigel Patrick.

Filming began in July 1954 and took place at Shepperton Studios in England, and on location in Germany.

The budget was £209,671 plus fees for Widmark, Allen and Broccoli.

== Reception ==
=== Box office ===
According to Kinematograph Weekly it was a "money maker" at the British box office in 1955.

=== Critical ===
Filmink called it "sluggish".

== See also ==
- List of British films of 1955
