= Thunderbolt (1947 film) =

1947 film by John Sturges, William Wyler

- Original theatrical poster
- Directed by: Lt Col William Wyler; Capt John Sturges
- Written by: M/Sgt Lester Koenig
- Produced by: U.S. Army Air Forces
- Narrated by: Lloyd Bridges; Eugene Kern; James Stewart (prologue)
- Edited by: Lt Col William Wyler; Capt John Sturges
- Music by: Cpl Gail Kubik
- Color process: Technicolor
- Production companies: Carl Krueger Productions; U.S. War Department
- Distributed by: Monogram Pictures
- Release date: July 26, 1947 (US)
- Running time: 44 minutes
- Country: United States
- Language: English

Thunderbolt is a 1947 film directed by William Wyler and John Sturges which documented the American aerial operations of Operation Strangle in World War II, when flyers of the Twelfth Air Force based on Corsica successfully impeded Axis supply lines to the Gustav Line and Anzio beachhead. The film was originally shot in 16mm color by members of the Army Air Forces. The 12th Combat Camera Unit recorded the combat footage using cameras mounted on some of the P-47s and a B-25 medium bomber equipped as a camera ship to accompany the fighters.

Narrated by Lloyd Bridges and Eugene Kern, Thunderbolt! purports to follow a P-47 Thunderbolt squadron of the group through an interdiction mission from the time they wake up to their return to base afterwards with one aircraft missing. (Note: Kern was also the principal narrator of Memphis Belle: A Story of a Flying Fortress. Gabriel Miller lists him as the sole narrator of Thunderbolt, while the Internet Movie Database lists both.) The directors edited their footage to recreate a mission against an unidentified target in northern Italy that resembles that of a May 1, 1944, mission against a railroad tunnel at Rignano sull'Arno, Italy, in which Lt. Col. Gilbert O. Wymond Jr. was awarded the Silver Star for destroying an ammunition dump concealed in a house near Siena and incurred severe damage to his P-47, Hun Hunter XIV. Wymond appears prominently with his P-47 throughout the documentary.

Directors Wyler and Sturges, serving as officers in the AAF, were attached to the 12th CCU during the period it filmed the activities of the 57th Fighter Group. Wyler used his association as a "passport" to visit many areas of liberated Europe after the completion of the initial shooting.

Although shown to the press late in 1945, Thunderbolt! was not generally released until 1947 by Monogram Pictures, and was re-released in 1950 during the Korean War. Half of the 1947 profits from the film's release went to the Army Air Force Relief Society and the United States Treasury. The introduction to the film by James Stewart was filmed in late January 1947. Stewart had commanded a bomber wing as a colonel during the war.

== Synopsis ==
Thunderbolt opens with an introduction by James Stewart, who remarks that 1944 has become "ancient history", but reads a message from postwar Army Air Forces commander General Carl Spaatz that, even though the units in the picture happen to be American, the mission depicted could easily have been an RAF mission, and indeed belongs to all people who desire freedom.

Some of the Republic P-47 Thunderbolt aircraft were modified with cameras: a pair mounted in the cockpit behind the pilot to film both ahead and behind the aircraft, under the wing, in the wheel well of the landing gear, on the instrument panel to film the pilot, or in the guns, synchronized to film when the guns fired. (Note: The gun cameras were known in AAF vernacular as GSAPs, or Gun Sight Aiming Point cameras. Manufactured by Fairchild Camera and Instrument, the (1944) AN-N6 GSAP was automatic and mounted on all AAF fighters, not just those depicted in Thunderbolt. Each GSAP was a heated, 24 volt electrically-driven camera loaded with a 50-foot Type G 16mm Kodachrome film magazine, and its Wollensak V 35mm f/3.5 lens was set at infinity. The GSAP was linked to the same solenoid that fired the guns and was activated for a pre-set interval within 1/8 of a second after trigger pull. Vibration from the firing guns often caused fuzzy images.)

The storyline of Thunderbolt begins by showing desolate areas of Italy in March 1944, noting that this was the fulfillment of the promise of Fascism, an idea dedicated to the proposition that some men are meant to be the slaves of others. The film next brings the audience to Alto Air Base, Corsica, introducing us to members of the 65th Fighter Squadron and explains the objectives of Operation Strangle by way of an after-breakfast briefing that merges into an animated map of Italy showing the Allies stuck at the Gustav line, and the mission to cut off the supply lines by destroying bridges and roads in Northern Italy. (Note: The 57th FG had moved here from the Italian mainland on March 28, 1944, specifically for Operation Strangle.)

The film then follows the pilots led by their young squadron commander through the tense moments before the flight, identifies them by name as they take off in pairs, and observes their journey to the mainland while flying in formation. The pilots are shown finding and destroying their target, a bridge, then carrying out independent strafing of targets of opportunity, seeking trains, lighthouses, anything that could be used by the enemy, and destroying it.

When the pilots return, the film shows how they try to relax in the makeshift American community in Corsica. It also takes a melancholy look into how some of them are getting along emotionally, thinking of what else they could be doing with "the best years of their lives." Additionally, the film graphically and unflinchingly portrays the tragic outcomes of P-47 crashes.

Thunderbolt ends with the Allied forces liberating Rome on June 4, 1944. The narrators note that it is the "evening" of the mission in Corsica, but not the end of the war. At the end of the film, the words "THE END" appear, followed by a red question mark.

== Production ==
Following the success of his documentary, Memphis Belle: A Story of a Flying Fortress, filmed in the first half of 1943, Wyler returned to Europe with a team consisting of Sturges and screenwriter Lester Koenig. He arrived in Rome shortly after its liberation in June 1944, followed by the rest of the team a few days later, focusing on Operation Strangle at the suggestion of General Henry H. Arnold. They attached themselves to the 12th CCU, where Wyler recruited former wildlife photographer Sgt. Karl H. Maslowski into his team as cinematographer. In July, they flew to Alto Landing Ground on northeast Corsica, the base of the 57th FG. 57th Group commander Col. Archie J. Knight acted as technical adviser for the production. (Note: Maslowski, from Cincinnati, Ohio, entered the AAF at the age of 28 and was assigned to the First Motion Picture Unit, where his supervisor was Capt. Ronald Reagan. Feeling his camera skills were being underused, he requested a transfer to a combat zone. He was sent to Corsica where he understudied production with Wyler in addition to his camera duties. Following the war Maslowski became a freelance producer of conservation and wildlife documentaries, both for government organizations such as the Ohio Division of Wildlife and corporations such as Sohio. He also provided narratives for films produced by the National Audubon Society and the National Geographic Society.) (Note: Peter Maslowski who wrote Armed With Cameras: The American Military Photographers of World War II is the son of Karl H. Maslowski.)

Wyler often followed front line ground units in Italy during the project period, filming from the ground battle damage inflicted by the aircraft, but Sturges and the remainder of the team stayed with the 57th FG, filming its combat missions, until September 1944. Wyler and most of the 12th CCU had just gone to Southern France in an attempt to film the fighter-bomber attacks from the ground when the unit was ordered to return to the United States by Headquarters AAF; it had been in combat nearly two years. Maslowski was transferred to the 9th CCU and Wyler used its cameramen to try to complete the assignment, but the weather proved too poor for color photography and only more footage of damage on the ground was obtained.

Wyler and Sturges flew to London in October to edit the film and have it processed into 35mm by Technicolor at the Eastman Kodak labs. They found that only 1% of the footage from the cameras mounted in the P-47s was usable. The further delay in editing meant Sturges and Koenig returned to Hollywood to continue editing raw footage and write the narration script. Wyler remained in Europe touring captured areas and in March 1945 decided to make one last flight in the B-25 to film more "atmosphere shots."

Returning to Grosseto Air Field in Tuscany after the flight, Wyler found he could not hear and had difficulty in maintaining his balance. He had suffered total deafness as a result of nerve damage in the noisy unpressurized aircraft, and was returned to the United States on April 10, 1945 for hospitalization. (Note: The 57th FG had redeployed to Grosseto Air Field from Corsica on September 11, 1944.) The 57th FG had moved here from the Italian mainland on March 28, 1944, specifically for Operation Strangle. Shortly after he was released from the Army.

Before Thunderbolt could be edited, when the war in Europe ended, the project was shelved and Wyler found little interest, even in the AAF, for completing the film. Nevertheless, he felt that the film should be seen by "the people that paid for it."

== Reception ==
At the end of the war, Wyler conducted an unsuccessful letter-writing campaign trying to find a distributor for Thunderbolt. Recovering part of the hearing in his left ear, Wyler completed the film and attempted to drum up support for its release by showing it to Hollywood trade publications in October 1945. However, the continued lack of interest kept the film from being released theatrically until July 1947 when Monogram Pictures distributed it, donating a quarter of the profits to the Army Air Force Relief Society and returning another quarter to the U.S. government.

Thunderbolt was critically reviewed by Bosley Crowther in the October 27, 1947 edition of The New York Times. He noted: "The employment of tactical air power in support of ground troops is thrillingly demonstrated in 'Thunderbolt!' ... [the film] graphically describes the use of air power while giving a vivid portrayal of how fighter pilots lived, fought and died."

== See also ==
- List of Allied propaganda films of World War II
