= Gordon Binkerd =

American composer

- Born: May 22, 1916; Lynch, Nebraska, U.S.
- Died: September 3, 2003 (aged 87) Urbana, Illinois, U.S.
- Genres: Classical
- Occupations: Composer
- Instruments: Piano

Gordon Ware Binkerd (May 22, 1916 – September 5, 2003) was an American classical music composer and pianist. An eminent and prolific composer, his best known works include his choral works (Tomorrow the Fox Will Come to Town, Though Your Strangeness Frets My Heart) and his Essays for the Piano.

== Biography ==
=== Background and early life ===
The son of Archibald and Verna Jones Binkerd, Gordon Binkerd was born in the Ponca Reservation in Lynch, Nebraska on May 22, 1916. He was the eldest of three boys. His father, who worked for the Bell Telephone Company, resettled the family in Gregory, South Dakota.

His talent was first discovered at age fifteen when he was chosen as one of the five best pianists in America at a national competition in Marion, Indiana. In 1933, Binkerd left home to attend Dakota Wesleyan University in Mitchell, South Dakota. There, he benefited from associations with musicians such as Gail Kubik and Russell Danburg. Binkerd was also influenced by teachers who nurtured his interest in literature and poetry. He graduated from DWU in 1937.

In 1940, Binkerd started masters studies at the Eastman School of Music, graduating with a degree in composition in 1941.

During World War II, Binkerd served in the US Navy.

His talent for composition began to ripen when he entered Harvard College in 1946. As a candidate for the PhD in musicology, his absorption of music of the past provided a historical base of knowledge that framed his compositional perspective. His skills were refined as a student of Walter Piston and as teaching assistant to Irving Fine.

During his Harvard years, he lived in an apartment that did not have a piano. This forced him to learn to compose away from the instrument.

In 1949, Binkerd became a theorist and composer at the University of Illinois. Each summer he participated in retreats in New Hampshire and New York in order to compose.

After composing a few works that used the serial technique, he abandoned this approach in 1955. His harmonic language became more tonal, but tonal centers remained ambiguous.

In the mid 1960s, Binkerd entered into a contract for the publication of all his music with the New York publishing house Boosey & Hawkes. By that time, he had already written three symphonies; a piano sonata; two string quartets; a growing list of sonatas for wind and string instruments and a large quantity of chamber, choral and vocal music, which his publisher began to release in 1965.

He retired from academia in 1971 in order to fully devote himself to composition. His writing was brought to an end by the onset of Alzheimer's disease in 1996.

=== Death ===
Binkerd died of Alzheimer's disease Friday, September 5, 2003 at his Urbana, Illinois home.

== Achievements ==
As a blooming composer Binkerd was the first professor at the University of Illinois to become a member of its Center for Advanced Study in 1959, only having entered as a regular teacher in 1949. Also in 1959, he became a Guggenheim fellowship recipient. In 1964, Binkerd received the National Institute of Arts and Letters award. As a composer he received many commissions for music from such institutions as the Chicago Symphony Orchestra, the St. Louis Symphony Orchestra, the University of Illinois, South Dakota State University, the Fromm Music foundation and the Ford Foundation in 1973. Dakota Wesleyan University honored Binkerd as Alumnus of the Year in 1987 and awarded him an Honorary Doctorate in Fine Arts in 1996.

== Compositions ==
- Sonatina for Flute and Piano (1947)
- Sonata for Cello and Piano (composed in 1952, First major work)
- Symphony No. 1 (composed in 1954)
- Symphony No. 2 (1956-57)
- String Quartet No. 1 (1957)
- And I am Old to Know (composed in 1959)
- Symphony No. 3 (1959)
- Three Canzonas (1960)
- Shut out that Moon (1968)
- Three Songs for Mezzo-Soprano and String Quartet (1971)

== Publications ==
- Alleluia for St. Francis. For medium voice and piano. <[Words] from the Roman-Seraphic Missal.> (1977)
- Sonatina for Flute and Piano (B.W.I. 245) (1972)
- Binkerd: Secret Love (Voice/Cello/Harp) - Vocal Solo Sheet Music (1967)
- Binkerd: O Darling Room - Vocal Solo Sheet Music
