= A Prize of Gold (novel) =

1953 novel

- First edition
- Author: Max Catto
- Language: English
- Genre: Thriller
- Publisher: Heinemann
- Publication date: 1953
- Publication place: United Kingdom
- Media type: Print

A Prize of Gold is a 1953 thriller novel by the British writer Max Catto.

== Film adaptation ==
In 1955 it was adapted into a film of the same title directed by Mark Robson and starring Richard Widmark, Mai Zetterling and Nigel Patrick.

== Bibliography ==
- Goble, Alan. The Complete Index to Literary Sources in Film. Walter de Gruyter, 1999.
