= The Man Outside (1933 film) =

1933 film

- Theatrical release poster
- Directed by: George A. Cooper
- Written by: Gerald Verner; H. Fowler Mear
- Produced by: Julius Hagen
- Starring: Henry Kendall; Gillian Lind; Joan Gardner
- Cinematography: Sydney Blythe
- Edited by: Jack Harris
- Music by: William Trytel
- Production company: Real Art Productions
- Distributed by: RKO Pictures
- Release date: May 1933
- Running time: 50 minutes
- Country: United Kingdom
- Language: English

The Man Outside is a 1933 British crime film directed by George A. Cooper and starring Henry Kendall, Gillian Lind and Joan Gardner. It was written by Gerald Verner and H. Fowler Mear, and made as a quota quickie, distributed by RKO Pictures.

== Plot summary ==
A criminal gang searches for stolen diamonds stashed in a country house following a major robbery.

== Cast ==
- Henry Kendall as Harry Wainwright
- Gillian Lind as Ann
- Joan Gardner as Peggy Fordyce
- Michael Hogan as Shiner Talbot
- Cyril Raymond as Captain Fordyce
- John Turnbull as Inspector Jukes
- Louis Hayward as Frank Elford
- Ethel Warwick as Georgina Yapp

== Production ==
The film was shot at Twickenham Studios in London with sets designed by the art director James A. Carter.

== Reception ==
Kine Weekly wrote: "A mystery drama with clever plot put over in good style by a capable cast. The story has plenty of light repartee in its dialogue and the artists make the most of their chances. It is entertainment from beginning to end, the mystery being well-sustained and the direction keeping the action going strongly. A supporting feature of merit."

The Daily Film Renter wrote: "Henry Kendall, as an apparent idler of the 'silly ass' type, but really Scotland Yard man, is as efficient as usual, but somewhat stilted dialogue detracts from quality of film. Lurking stranger outside country mansion, and well-devised suspense values, are strongest features in picture which, although splendidly mounted, is apt to slow development. ... If it were not for the whimsical humour of Henry Kendall, one might class this picture as just another murder drama, but the star's personality infuses an angle of novelty into a rather hackneyed story."

Picturegoer wrote: "Quite a good plot, capably put over ... Henry Kendall is good as a detective who finds the thief, while Gillian Lind acts the part of a maid whose husband is found murdered, with feeling and conviction. John Turnbull plays well as a police inspector and Ethel Warwick is sound as an elderly aunt of the man who has inherited the house."
