= Gerald Hirschfeld =

American cinematographer (1921-2017)

- Born: 25 April 1921; New York City, New York, U.S.
- Died: 13 February 2017 (aged 95); Ashland, Oregon, U.S.
- Education: Columbia University
- Occupation: Cinematographer
- Spouse: Sarnell Ogus (m. 1946; div. 1980) Julia Tucker (m. 1982)
- Children: 8
- Military career
- Allegiance: United States
- Branch: United States Army
- Service years: 1942-45
- Unit: Signal Corps
- Conflicts: World War II; Pacific War; Battle of Okinawa

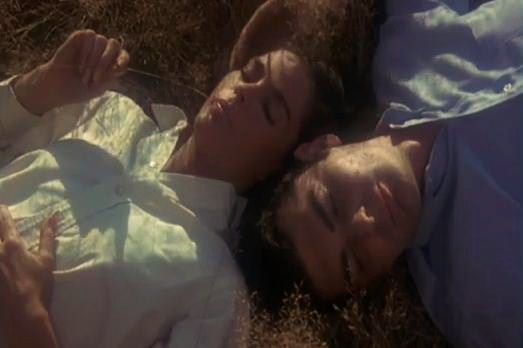
Ali MacGraw and Richard Benjamin in Goodbye, Columbus

Gerald J. Hirschfeld, ASC (25 April 1921 – 13 February 2017) was an American cinematographer.

== Early life and education ==
Born and raised in a Jewish family in New York City, Hirschfeld originally trained as a fashion photography. In 1942 during World War II, Hirschfeld enlisted in the Army, and was attached to the Signal Corps Photographic Center in Astoria, Queens, where he was an assistant and operator for established Hollywood cinematographers including Leo Tover and Stanley Cortez, shooting training and propaganda films. Later in the war, Hirschfeld was a combat cameraman in Okinawa.

After his discharge, he enrolled in Columbia University on the G.I. Bill, while continuing to work for the Signal Corps. In 1947, he shot Shades of Grey, a re-tooling of John Huston's (then-unreleased and suppressed) Let There Be Light.

== Career ==
Beginning in the late 1940s, Hirschfeld worked as a cinematographer for MPO Videotronics, a New York-based commercial and industrial film production company. He eventually rose to the company's vice president and head of its camera department, where his protégés included Owen Roizman and Gordon Willis. Hirschfeld remained vice president until 1972, well into his feature film career.

Hirschfeld made feature film debut with the low-budget film noir C-Man (1949). He and director Joseph Lerner went on to shoot several more B-movies for Eagle-Lion Films, which brought him to the attention of Sidney Lumet. Lumet selected Hirschfeld to shoot his feature directorial debut 12 Angry Men, but the producers insisted upon hiring Boris Kaufman, who had just won an Oscar for On the Waterfront. Seven years later, Lumet and Hirschfeld would collaborate on Fail Safe (1964), which proved the latter's first major studio film. He also shot Lumet's 1972 film Child's Play.

His feature film credits included Goodbye, Columbus, Last Summer (both 1969), Cotton Comes to Harlem, Diary of a Mad Housewife (both 1970), Summer Wishes, Winter Dreams (1973), The Car, The World's Greatest Lover (both 1977), Coma (1978), Neighbors (1981), and To Be or Not to Be (1983). He has worked with directors like Frank Perry, John G. Avildsen, Michael Crichton and Gene Wilder.

One of his best known works was for Mel Brooks' Young Frankenstein (1974): he shot the picture entirely in black-and-white, a rarity in the 1970s. In a 2017 interview, Hirschfeld recalled, "At first, I balked at the decision to do the film in black-and-white.... But the director [Brooks] was firm and I soon realized, as I progressed more into the feeling of the film, that he was 100% correct." Hirschfeld used high-key backlight and film processing techniques to suppress the midtones and create a high-contrast look, both paying homage to and comically-exaggerating the look of the Universal Monster films Brooks was parodying.

Hirschfeld was also active in cinematography education, penning articles for American Cinematographer writing the instructional manuals Image Control: Motion Picture and Video Camera Filters and Lab Techniques and The Hand Exposure Meter Book. In 2007, he received the ASC Presidents Award.

== Personal life ==
Hirschfeld married Sarnell Ogus in 1946, they divorced in 1980. He remarried to script supervisor Julia Tucker in 1982, and they remained together until his death. He had eight children and six grandchildren. One of his sons, Alec Hirschfeld, is a camera operator.

=== Death ===
Hirschfeld died in Ashland, Oregon, aged 95.

== Filmography ==
=== Film ===
| Year | Title | Director | Notes |
|---|---|---|---|
| 1948 | Shades of Grey | Joseph Henabery | |
| 1949 | C-Man | Joseph Lerner | 1st of 4 collaborations with Lerner |
| 1950 | Guilty Bystander | Joseph Lerner | |
| 1950 | With These Hands | Jack Arnold | |
| 1951 | Mister Universe | Joseph Lerner | |
| 1951 | Two Gals and a Guy | Alfred E. Green | |
| 1958 | Josette from New Orleans | Joseph Lerner | |
| 1964 | Fail Safe | Sidney Lumet | |
| 1967 | The Incident | Larry Peerce | 1st of 7 collaborations with Peerce |
| 1968 | Days in My Father's House | David Nagata | |
| 1969 | Goodbye, Columbus | Larry Peerce | |
| 1969 | Last Summer | Frank Perry | 1st of 3 collaborations with Perry |
| 1969 | Some Kind of a Nut | Garson Kanin | |
| 1970 | Cotton Comes to Harlem | Ossie Davis | |
| 1970 | Diary of a Mad Housewife | Frank Perry | |
| 1971 | Doc | Frank Perry | |
| 1971 | T.R. Baskin | Herbert Ross | |
| 1972 | Child's Play | Sidney Lumet | |
| 1973 | Two People | Robert Wise | Director of photography: New York unit |
| 1973 | Summer Wishes, Winter Dreams | Gilbert Cates | 1st of 4 collaborations with Cates |
| 1974 | The Dion Brothers | Jack Starrett | |
| 1974 | W | Richard Quine | |
| 1974 | Young Frankenstein | Mel Brooks | |
| 1975 | The Ultimate Warrior | Robert Clouse | |
| 1976 | Two-Minute Warning | Larry Peerce | |
| 1976 | One Summer Love | Gilbert Cates | |
| 1976 | Mastermind | Alex March | |
| 1977 | The Car | Elliot Silverstein | |
| 1977 | The World's Greatest Lover | Gene Wilder | |
| 1978 | Coma | Michael Crichton | Director of photography: Jefferson Institute sequence |
| 1978 | Slow Dancing in the Big City | John G. Avildsen | Director of photography: Lincoln Center sequence |
| 1979 | The Bell Jar | Larry Peerce | |
| 1979 | Americathon | Neal Israel | |
| 1980 | Why Would I Lie? | Larry Peerce | |
| 1980 | Sunday Lovers | Gene Wilder | Segment: "Skippy" |
| 1981 | Neighbors | John G. Avildsen | |
| 1981 | The House of God | Donald Wrye | |
| 1982 | My Favorite Year | Richard Benjamin | |
| 1983 | To Be or Not to Be | Alan Johnson | |
| 1985 | Head Office | Ken Finkleman | |
| 1987 | Malone | Harley Cokeliss | |

=== Television ===
| Year | Title | Notes |
|---|---|---|
| 1953 | Johnny Jupiter | 3 episodes |
| 1964 | Mr. Broadway | Episode: "An Eye on Emily" |
| 1983 | Mr. Smith | 7 episodes |

==== TV films, specials and miniseries ====
| Year | Title | Director | Notes |
|---|---|---|---|
| 1954 | Mandrake the Magician | Will Jason | |
| 1960 | The Gillmen | Dan Enright | |
| 1973 | The Affair | Gilbert Cates | |
| 1975 | Shell Game | Glenn Jordan | |
| 1978 | King | Abby Mann | Additional photography |
| 1982 | Country Gold | Gilbert Cates | |
| 1985 | Love Lives On | Larry Peerce | |
| 1989 | The Neon Empire | Larry Peerce | |
| 1990 | Child in the Night | Mike Ray | |
| 1994 | Secret Sins of the Father | Beau Bridges | |
