= Daniel Crozier =

American composer and academic

Daniel Crozier is an American composer and academic. He is associate professor of Theory and Composition at Rollins College in Winter Park, Florida.

== Career ==
Works by Crozier have received performances in New York, Philadelphia, Baltimore, Pittsburgh, Boston, Toronto, Syracuse (New York), at Washington's Kennedy Center, the Aspen Music Festival, the Oregon Bach Festival Composers' Symposium, and by the Bach Festival Society of Winter Park, and have been recorded by MARK Records and Navona Records as well as for broadcast by the Belgian Radio and Television Network. "Ceremonies for Orchestra", Triptych, his first symphony, has been recorded by the Seattle Symphony under conductor Gerard Schwarz. The Toccata for Soprano Saxophone and String Trio was premiered in 2002 by saxophonist Branford Marsalis and the Walden Chamber Players. In June 2004, he was invited by composer John Harbison to serve as a guest composer at the Songfest 2004 Program for New Art Song at Pepperdine University.

Crozier's awards include ASCAP Special Awards annually since 1996, an ASCAP Foundation Young Composer's Grant for his first opera, The Reunion, to a libretto by Roger Brunyate, and first prize in the National Opera Association Chamber Opera Competition for his second, With Blood, With Ink, to a libretto by Peter M. Krask. In May 2000, excerpts from the opera were included in the New York City Opera's Showcasing American Composers Series. Opera News said: "unquestionably worthy, with compelling multidimensional characters. The cast and creators have obviously put enormous living care into bringing Sor Juana's largely un-known story to musical life." The opera was first staged professionally in April 2014 at the Fort Worth Opera.

Crozier has worked with Eliot Newsome, Jean Eichelberger Ivey, and John Harbison. He holds the Doctor of Musical Arts degree from the Peabody Conservatory of the Johns Hopkins University and has served on the faculty at the Peabody Preparatory, Radford University, and is currently Assistant Professor of Theory and Composition at Rollins College.

As of 2024 Crozier works at Rollins College in Winter Park, Florida.
