= Symphony Concertante (Kubik) =

Symphony Concertante is a composition by Gail Kubik (1914–1984) for trumpet, viola, piano, and orchestra. It was premiered January 7, 1952 by its commissioner, The Little Orchestra, Thomas Scherman conducting.

The work is structured as follows:

1. Fast, vigorously
2. Quietly
3. Fast, with energy.

In the score Kubik notes the work "represents an effort to reconcile the large-scale expressive demands of a symphony with the virtuoso exhibitionistic demands of the concerto form". Kubik was awarded the Pulitzer Prize for Music in 1952 for the piece. The committee wrote: "The Symphony Concertante is brilliant and exuberant, full of rhythmic vitality, the orchestration both original and skillful."

The piece is based on Kubik's score for the 1949 film C-Man. When the film's producers Laurel Films, Inc went out of business in 1951, Kubik, having had the foresight to reserve copyright to the music beyond just motion picture use, was able to use the film score material to compose the piece. This example was used by Howard Hanson and copyright expert Leonard Zissu during 1965 congressional hearings in favor of revising copyright law more favorably for composers.
