= The World's Greatest Lover =

1977 film by Gene Wilder

- Theatrical release poster
- Directed by: Gene Wilder
- Written by: Gene Wilder
- Produced by: Gene Wilder
- Starring: Gene Wilder; Carol Kane; Dom DeLuise
- Cinematography: Gerald Hirschfeld
- Edited by: Anthony A. Pellegrino
- Music by: John Morris
- Production company: 20th Century-Fox
- Distributed by: 20th Century Fox
- Release dates: December 16, 1977 (New York); December 18, 1977 (United States)
- Running time: 89 minutes
- Country: United States
- Language: English
- Budget: $4.8 million
- Box office: $21 million

The World's Greatest Lover is a 1977 American parody film directed, written by and starring Gene Wilder, and co-starring Carol Kane and Dom DeLuise. It is a tribute/spoof of classic silent comedies and the "old Hollywood" of the 1920s, specifically the popularity of romantic icon Rudolph Valentino.

== Plot ==
In the silent film era, Rainbow Studios executives figure they are losing revenue to a rival studio because they do not have Rudolph Valentino. Led by studio head Adolph Zitz, they decide to hold a contest for the World's Greatest Lover in order to find a star to combat Valentino's popularity.

Rudy Hickman is a neurotic baker from Milwaukee, but aspires to become a Hollywood star. His entry into the contest tests his marriage, and his neuroses manifest in his screen test, where he nearly kills his fellow actress. Surprisingly, this behavior scores favorably with Zitz and the studio executives reviewing his performance. Now calling himself "Rudy Valentine," he gets a slot in the final phase of the contest, just after finding his wife Annie has left him.

== Cast ==
- Gene Wilder as Rudy Hickman / Rudy Valentine
- Carol Kane as Annie Hickman
- Dom DeLuise as Adolph Zitz
- Fritz Feld as Tomaso Abalone
- Ronny Graham as The Director
- Danny DeVito as Assistant Director
- Rolfe Sedan as Train Conductor

== Production ==
The railroad scenes when Valentine and his wife travel from Milwaukee to Hollywood were filmed on the Sierra Railroad in Tuolumne County, California.

== Release ==
The world premiere of The World's Greatest Lover took place in New York, on December 16, 1977. It was screened in Los Angeles on December 18, 1977, and released in the United States nationwide, by 20th Century Fox.

=== Home media ===
The film was originally released in many countries on VHS. 20th Century Fox released the film on DVD in April 2006 with two special features; an audio commentary with Gene Wilder and the original theatrical trailer.

== Reception ==
=== Critical response ===
Critics who compared it to Wilder's earlier works with Mel Brooks were left largely unimpressed by the film, feeling it was not as balanced as previous works, and felt more excessive.

Vincent Canby of The New York Times described the film as not only "frequently side-splitting," but "uncommonly handsome" for a comedy, "the period sets and costumes having a lot of the fantasy quality of a stylish Broadway musical." Arthur D. Murphy of Variety called the film "a good period comedy," adding, "This time the individual sketchpieces ... emerge as varyingly humorous episodes strung out on a skimpy story line." Gene Siskel of the Chicago Tribune gave the film 2 stars out of 4 and reported, "I rarely laughed or even smiled during 'The World's Greatest Lover.' Quite the contrary, I found it depressing, because at the same time I wasn't laughing I realized that Wilder, one of the screen's finest bittersweet comic actors, seems hell-bent on a directing career. Therefore, to see 'The World's Greatest Lover' is to be filled with a sense of loss, the loss of seeing less of Wilder in Brooks' films or films other than his own." Gary Arnold of The Washington Post called the film "not very clever at all" and wrote, "The prevailing tone of 'Lover' is shrill wretched excess, in both slapstick and sentimental passages." Clyde Jeavons of The Monthly Film Bulletin wrote, "On top of its statutory, and for the most part uninspired slapstick, the film borrows freely from many of Hollywood's more anarchic comedians, from the Marx Brothers to Jerry Lewis, but never accurately enough to give the audience the satisfaction of recognition. Most unsettling of all is Wilder's own brand of rampaging comic hysteria, which here goes disastrously unchecked ... and augmented by the similar excesses of Dom DeLuise, Fritz Feld and Carl Ballantine, generates more decibels than laughs."

=== Box office ===
Despite the negative reception, the film was a commercial success. Produced on a budget of $4.8 million, the film grossed $21 million at the box office, earning $9.9 million US theatrical rentals. It was the 25th highest-grossing film of 1977.
