= The Devil at 4 O'Clock =

1961 film by Mervyn LeRoy

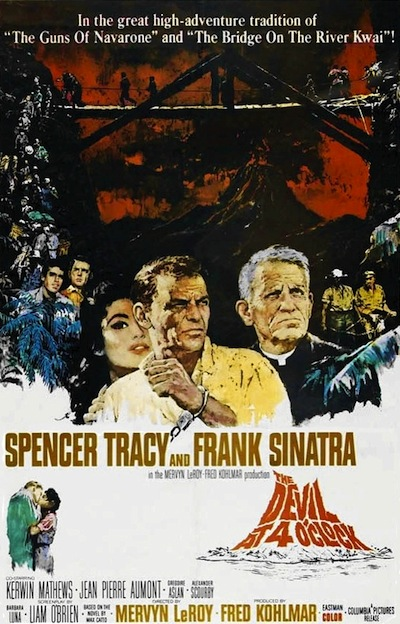
- Theatrical poster by Howard Terpning
- Directed by: Mervyn LeRoy
- Screenplay by: Liam O'Brien
- Based on: The Devil at 4 O'Clock; 1958 novel by Max Catto
- Produced by: Fred Kohlmar
- Starring: Spencer Tracy; Frank Sinatra
- Cinematography: Joseph F. Biroc
- Edited by: Charles Nelson
- Music by: George Duning
- Color process: Eastmancolor
- Production company: Columbia Pictures
- Distributed by: Columbia Pictures
- Release date: October 18, 1961 (New York City)
- Running time: 126 minutes
- Country: United States
- Language: English
- Budget: $5,721,786
- Box office: $4,550,000

The Devil at 4 O'Clock is a 1961 American adventure film directed by Mervyn LeRoy and starring Spencer Tracy and Frank Sinatra. Based on a 1958 novel with the same title by British writer Max Catto, the film was a precursor to Krakatoa, East of Java and the disaster films of the 1970s such as The Poseidon Adventure, Earthquake and The Towering Inferno.

The film deals with multiple issues of prejudice concerning age, blindness, disease and alcoholism. It also considers moral issues, such as a priest who drinks to excess and criminals who commit acts of self-sacrifice.

== Plot ==
A small plane approaches the fictional Pacific island of Talua in French Polynesia, 500 miles from Tahiti, the plane's destination. The plane and its cargo of three manacled prisoners and a priest makes an overnight stop on the island, planning to fly onward the next day.

On the island, Father Doonan has been relieved of his duties by Father Perreau. Doonan, an alcoholic, has fallen out of favor with the island's residents because he stumbled upon the island's carefully hidden secret: leprosy among the children of the islands. Doonan had built a hospital for the children by the island's volcano and he regularly visits homes soliciting funds or goods for the leper colony. However, the inhabitants have grown tired of Doonan's demands for donations and view him as an irritation.

Three convicts from the plane, Harry, Charlie and Marcel, are put to work at the leper hospital. All is seemingly normal until the volcano erupts and the governor orders an evacuation. The governor cannot communicate with the freighter that has just left and plans to evacuate the island with one seaplane and a schooner.

The children are still on the slope of the volcano in the hospital and Doonan is desperate to rescue them. When the freighter suddenly appears back at the island, Doonan cannot find any townspeople willing to help the children. He convinces the governor to drop some men to rescue the children. The schooner will wait for them until 4:00 p.m. the next day before it has to leave because of the tides.

The three criminals embark on a looting spree while the townspeople are distracted, but when they enter the church, Doonan thinks that they have come to volunteer. When he tells them that he might be able to convince the authorities to reduce their sentence, the convicts agree to parachute to the hospital with Doonan to rescue the children and staff. The children and staff at the hospital cheer as they see the four parachutes come down, and they go to find them in the jungle. Marcel, who has never jumped before, is caught in a tree.

At the hospital, they tie the children together in a line. The hospital collapses minutes after they leave. They descend down rocky paths on the mountainside. Lava flows in all around them. Each adult carries a child and Harry carries Camille, the blind nurse he has fallen in love with. On the second day, they tire on the long walk down. Harry now realizes that he has been carrying a dead child for miles, and he feels responsible. They bury the child and conduct a Christian burial service.

The group takes shelter in a cave and pray for rain. Doonan confesses that he married Harry and Camille on the way down, as he realizes that Harry is a good man. When they continue on, Marcel steps into a mud pool and disappears. They reach the timber bridge that they had feared would burn, but it is in very bad condition and has a river of lava below. Harry goes first, and Doonan and Charlie go underneath to manually support the structure. Charlie takes the whole weight on his back as they all cross. The volcano erupts again and the movement breaks the bridge, crushing Charlie. Doonan is left on the wrong side but the others continue.

Harry escorts the group to the town and onto the ship. He tells Camille to board the boat, saying, "I missed the boat a long time ago." He drives a truck back to the broken bridge.

Doonan comforts Charlie, who is near death, and Harry appears on the opposite side. With the bridge broken, neither can reach the other. Harry still has a chance to live, but he chooses to remain with his friends. Charlie dies and Doonan administers last rites. Doonan and Harry, who are aware of the silence that precedes a large explosion, wait on opposite sides of the chasm before the volcano violently explodes and destroys the mountain.

At sea, the survivors watch the sky turn red as the whole island is destroyed.

== Cast ==
- Spencer Tracy as Father Matthew Doonan
- Frank Sinatra as Harry
- Kerwin Mathews as Father Joseph Perreau
- Jean-Pierre Aumont as Jacques
- Grégoire Aslan as Marcel
- Alexander Scourby as The Governor
- Barbara Luna as Camille
- Cathy Lewis as Matron
- Bernie Hamilton as Charlie
- Martin Brandt as Doctor Wexler
- Lou Merrill as Aristide Giraud
- Marcel Dalio as Gaston
- Tom Middleton as Paul
- Ann Duggan as Clarisse
- Louis Mercier as Corporal
- Michele Montau as Margot

== Production ==
Filming started 22 September 1960.

The film was shot on location in the town of Lahaina and other locations on the island of Maui in Hawaii and in California. A structure representing the volcano was specially built on farmland outside of Fallbrook, California, and it was detonated with almost one ton of explosives. The explosion nearly killed the helicopter pilot and cameraman who were filming it. The effects were considered so good that they have been reused as stock footage over the years.

Because Spencer Tracy demanded top billing for his films, Frank Sinatra agreed to second billing to secure Tracy for the role of Father Doonan. The film was the most expensive that Columbia Pictures had made to that point.

The film's hazardous walk to the other side of the island by a group of people trapped by a volcano was largely copied in the volcano disaster film When Time Ran Out (1980).

== Reception ==
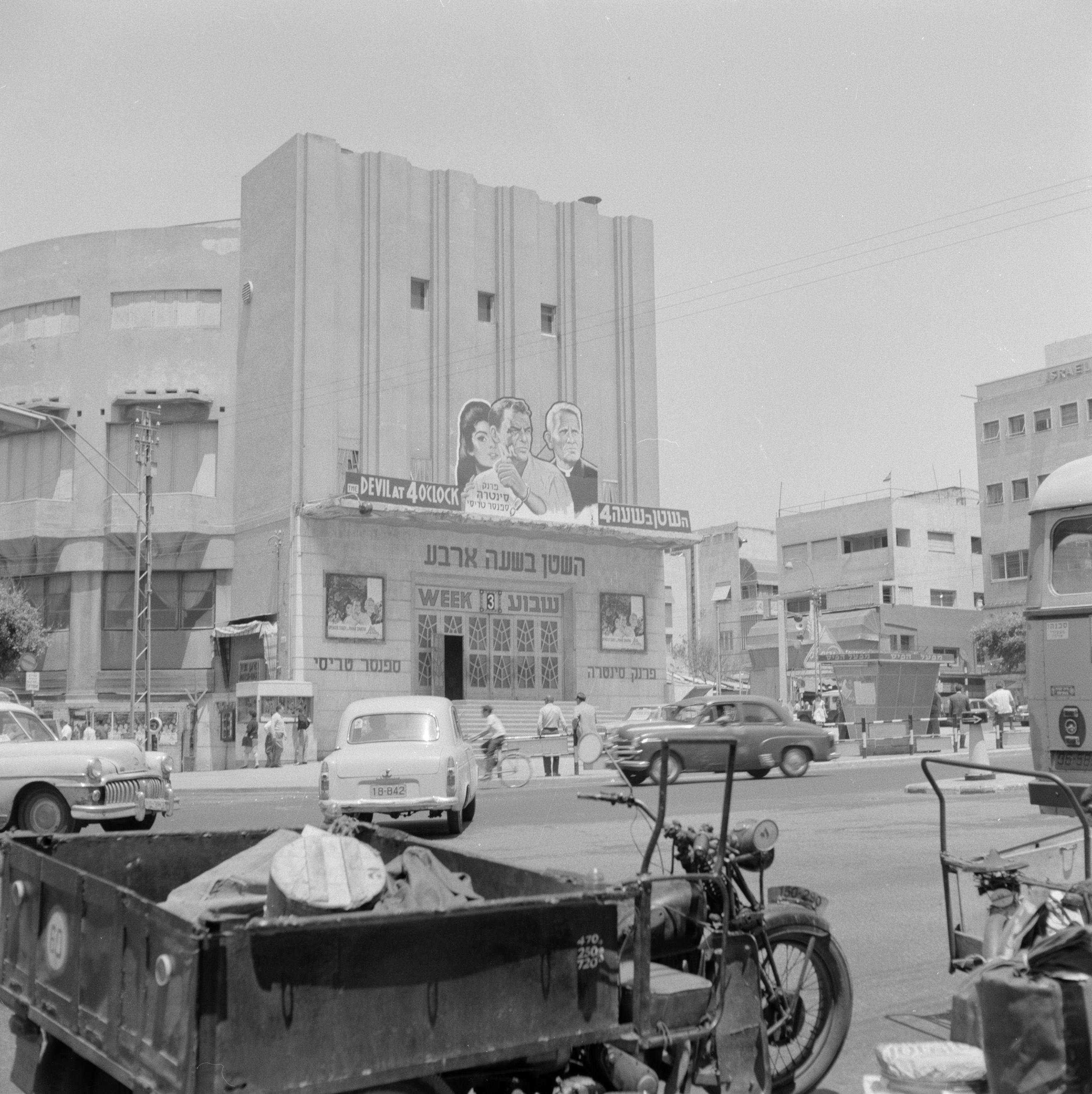
Showing at Tel-Aviv's Moghrabi theater in 1964

In a contemporary review for The New York Times, critic A. H. Weiler wrote: "Moviemaking and religious faith are subject to an amazing amount of buffeting ... For this diffuse feature derived from the Max Catto novel has such apparent attributes as Spencer Tracy, Frank Sinatra, color film, a plot literally as melodramatic as a volcanic eruption and dialogue that bandies about the name of the Almighty with enough abandon to give a cleric the shakes. But it merely makes superficial use of these potentially explosive ingredients." However, Weiler praised the film's special effects: "Especially commendable are the rumbling street cracking, devastating views of the town exposed to the earthquake resulting from the eruption. And, scenes of the erupting volcano and the lava coursing down the verdant mountain are also striking."

Variety commented on the film's "exceptional special effects" and praised the acting, noting that "Tracy delivers one of his more colorful portrayals in his hard-drinking cleric who has lost faith in his God, walloping over a character which sparks entire action of film. Sinatra's role, first-class but minor in comparison, is overshadowed in interest by Aslan, one of the convicts in a stealing part who lightens some of the more dramatic action."

On the review aggregator website Rotten Tomatoes, 67% of 6 critics' reviews are positive.

== See also ==
- List of American films of 1961
