= Vivian Adelberg Rudow =

American composer

Vivian Adelberg Rudow (born 1936) is an American composer, performance artist, conductor and concert producer. She composes in the genres of acoustic and electroacoustic music with works ranging from solo to full orchestra. She lives in Baltimore, Maryland.

== Education ==
Adelberg Rudow received a Bachelor of Music degree in piano in 1960 and a Master of Music degree in composition from the Peabody Institute of Johns Hopkins University in 1979. She studied piano with Austin Conradi and composition with Jean Eichelberger Ivey and Robert Hall Lewis. Her earliest composition and theory studies were under Grace Newsom Cushman at the Junior Conservatory Camp (a predecessor of The Walden School).

== Awards and honors ==
Adelberg Rudow has won multiple ASCAP Plus Awards since 1987. In 1982 her Force III was premiered by the Baltimore Symphony Orchestra under Sergiu Comissiona and she became the first Maryland composer to have an orchestral work performed in the new Joseph Meyerhoff Symphony Hall. In 1986, Rudow's composition, With Love; a fantasy for live cello and decorated cello cases, in memory of Myrtle Hollins Adelberg won First Prize in the 14th International Electroacoustic Music Composition Competition in Bourges, France in the Program Division. Adelberg Rudow won First Prize in the International Double Reed Society Composition Contest for her piece Kaddish for solo bassoon, and additionally received a Maryland State Arts Council Fellowship, a City Arts Individual Artist Grant and a Meet-the-Composer Grant.

== Career ==
Adelberg Rudow's music has been performed worldwide. Her composition Urbo Turbo was recorded by the London Philharmonic Orchestra. She has frequently collaborated with award-winning Maryland poet Grace Cavalieri, including three satellite radio specials of her music in Cavalieri's "Poet and the Poem" satellite radio broadcasts. Adelberg Rudow has developed her own style of performance art presentations named “The Vivian.” In 2000, she premiered her performance art piece Juan Blanco, Cuban Lawyer Variations of Variations in Havana during the International Electroacoustic Music Festival “Spring Time in Havana” for the 80th birthday of Juan Blanco, Director of the Cuban Electroacoustic Music studio. She performed the piece again in August 2001 at the Kennedy Center in Washington, DC during a Sonic Circuits concert. She was the founding artistic director of Res Musica Baltimore, later Res MusicAmerica, a successful organization active between 1980 and 1991 dedicated to presenting the works of living American composers. In 1988, she produced an International Electroacoustic Music Festival in Baltimore.

== Discography ==
- Love, Loss and Law, in memory of Myrtle Hollins Adelberg and Harry Adelberg. Music Documentaries: “With Love,” “Portrait of a Friend,” and “Portraits of Lawyers,” (originally The Velvet Hammers). December, 2009
- Le Chant du Monde, Harmonia Mundi Label, with the Bourges winners of the 16th composition contest 1988, “With Love,” Paula Skolnick-Virizlay, Violoncello.
- Electroshock Records– Various Electroacoustic Music, Vol. VIII (2003) “Racing Inside The Milky Way.”
- Electroshock Records– Various Electroacoustic Music, Vol. IX (2004) “Cuban Lawyer, Juan Blanco.”
- Sunbursts, solo piano works by 7 American women, Nanette Kaplan Solomon, pianist “Rebecca’s Suite,” Leonarda label, LE 345

== Selected works ==
- Americana Visited Variations (violin or viola and piano), 1984
- Ars Nova (two bassoons), 1981
- Call For Peace (flute plus tape), 2006
- Changing Space (prepared tape for dance), 1972
- Clouds of Memories, 2002
- Cuban Lawyer, Juan Blanco, excerpt from Portraits of Lawyers originally The Velvet Hammers (tape), 2000
- Dan’s Suite, in memory of Daniel Malkin, (cello and piano)
  - Lament (with optional narrator, text: Carole Malkin “Passover Questions”), 1997
  - The Bare Smooth Stone of Your Love (with optional narrator, text: Carole Malkin “Cello Recital”), 1998
- Dawn’s Journey, in memory of Dawn Culbertson
  - (piano and tape), 2005
  - (audio and DVD)
- Devy's Song (treble instrument and piano), 1984
- Dark Waters of Elba (orchestra), 2005
- Deepwater Horizons: Will We Sleep Again? (flute and piano), 2011
- Earth Day Suite:
  - Dark Waters Of The Chesapeake, (orchestra), 2010
  - Go Green! (flute concerto, orchestra), 2010
- Fanfare For My Hero, In The Pin Striped Suit (full orchestra), 1993
- Force III (full orchestra),1979
- The Head Remembers Victims, of W.W.II, (saxophone and prepared tape), 2008
- The Healing Place VI (flute, clarinet, violin, viola, violoncello, prepared tape, optional narrator, text: Grace Cavalieri), 1991
- I Pledge My Love, 1992
  - (tenor and string quartet)
  - (tenor and piano)
- John’s Song, in memory of John J. Hill, (voice or instrument and keyboard), 2006
- Journey of Waters (voice and 11 member ensemble, lyrics: Grace Cavalieri), 1994
- Journey of Waters (voice and piano), 1984
- Journey of Waters (small orchestra), 1991
- Journey of Waters II (new orchestral arrangement and voice), 2006
- Kaddish, in memory of Isaac Hollins, (solo bassoon) 1975
- No Rest For Devy's Spirit (solo viola), 1984
- Not Me! (violin, cello, and piano), 1989
- The Ocean Sings (guitar orchestra, or 5 guitars and solo viola), 2010
- Portrait of A Friend (tenor and prepared tape, text: Grace Cavalieri), 1986.
- Portraits of Lawyers, (sound collage, art music documentary) 1989–2004
- Purple Ice, 8-10 songs (voice and piano, lyrics: Grace Cavalieri), 1984–92
- Rebecca's Suite, in memory of Rebecca Blackwell (solo piano)
  - Rebecca’s Song, 1989
  - Rebecca’s Rainbow Racing Among the Stars, 1991
- The Sky Speaks, 1. Clouds (SSAATTBB chorus, soprano and violoncello solo, piano and 2 percussion), revised 2007
- Urbo Turbo (Urban Turbulence)
  - (full orchestra, alternate title: Spirit of America), 1999
  - (full orchestra and chorus), revised 2008
- Weeping Rocker III (chamber orchestra and SATB chorus), 1993
- With Love, a fantasy for live cello and cello cases in memory of Myrtle Hollins Adelberg (cello and prepared tape), 1986
