= On the Spot (play) =

1930 play

- Original language: English
- Written by: Edgar Wallace
- Genre: Crime
- Setting: Chicago

Premiere
- Date: 2 April 1930
- Place: Wyndham's Theatre

On the Spot is a 1930 Chicago-set play by the British writer Edgar Wallace. Wallace was inspired by a visit to the United States and, in particular, the Saint Valentine's Day Massacre. Known as a prolific author, he reportedly dictated the manuscript for the play in just four days. It was his greatest theatrical success.

It lasted for 342 performances on its original West End run. Beginning at Wyndham's Theatre, it later transferred to the Cambridge Theatre. The lead role of a Capone-like gangster Tony Perelli was played by Charles Laughton with Emlyn Williams as his henchman and Gillian Lind playing Perelli's Chinese mistress. Other cast members included W ronin Wilson, Roy Emerton, Carol Reed, Dennis Wyndham and Gladys Frazin.

It transferred to America in October 1930, with Crane Wilbur as Perelli and Anna May Wong as Minn Lee, and ran for 167 performances at the Forrest Theatre in New York. In 1931, Wallace novelised the play using the same title.

== Adaptation ==
It was adapted as an American film Dangerous to Know (1938). Directed by Robert Florey for Paramount Pictures it starred Anna May Wong and Akim Tamiroff. The play was adapted for radio by Raymond Raikes, and broadcast on BBC Radio 4, on 27 March 1976, with Peter Woodthorpe as Tony Perelli and Denise Bryer as Minn Lee.

== Bibliography ==
- Goble, Alan. The Complete Index to Literary Sources in Film. Walter de Gruyter, 1999.
- Kabatchnik, Amnon. Blood on the Stage, 1975-2000: Milestone Plays of Crime, Mystery, and Detection : an Annotated Repertoire. Rowman & Littlefield, 2012.
- Wearing, J. P. The London Stage 1930–1939: A Calendar of Productions, Performers, and Personnel. Rowman & Littlefield, 2014.
