= French Salad =

1934 play

- Written by: Max Catto
- Original language: English
- Genre: Comedy
- Setting: Outskirts of London, present day

Premiere
- Date premiered: 31 July 1934
- Place premiered: Westminster Theatre, London

French Salad is a 1934 comedy play by the British writer Max Catto. It appeared in London's West End between 31 July and 7 September 1934 initially at the Westminster Theatre before transferring to the Royalty Theatre. The West End cast included Clive Morton, Aubrey Dexter, A.R. Whatmore, Hilda Trevelyan, Leonora Corbett, Faith Bennett and Ellen Pollock.

== Adaptation ==
In 1936 it was adapted into the British film The Happy Family directed by Maclean Rogers and starring Hugh Williams, Eve Gray, Glennis Lorimer with Corbett and Pollock both reviving their stage roles.

== Bibliography ==
- Goble, Alan. The Complete Index to Literary Sources in Film. Walter de Gruyter, 1999.
- Wearing, J. P. The London Stage 1930–1939: A Calendar of Productions, Performers, and Personnel. Rowman & Littlefield, 2014.
