= The Flanagan Boy (novel) =

1949 novel

- Author: Max Catto
- Language: English
- Genre: Thriller
- Publisher: Harrap
- Publication date: 1949
- Publication place: United Kingdom
- Media type: Print

The Flanagan Boy is a 1949 crime thriller novel by the British author Max Catto. The plot has some similarities that of The Postman Always Rings Twice and its 1946 Hollywood film adaptation.

== Film version ==
In 1953 it was adapted into the film noir The Flanagan Boy directed by Reginald LeBorg and Barbara Payton, Frederick Valk and Tony Wright.

== Bibliography ==
- Goble, Alan. The Complete Index to Literary Sources in Film. Walter de Gruyter, 1999.
- Grant, John. A Comprehensive Encyclopedia of Film Noir: The Essential Reference Guide. Rowman & Littlefield, 2023.
