= Two Gals and a Guy =

1951 film by Alfred E. Green

- Directed by: Alfred E. Green
- Written by: Searle Kramer
- Produced by: John W. Arents; Irving Weisner
- Starring: Janis Paige; Robert Alda; James Gleason; Lionel Stander; Arnold Stang
- Cinematography: Gerald Hirschfeld
- Music by: Hal David
- Production companies: Weisner Brothers; Eagle-Lion Films
- Distributed by: United Artists
- Release date: June 24, 1951
- Running time: 70 minutes
- Country: United States
- Language: English

Two Gals and a Guy, also known as Baby and Me, is a 1951 comedy film directed by Alfred E. Green and starring Janis Paige, Robert Alda, James Gleason, Lionel Stander, Arnold Stang, the Three Suns and Patty McCormack in her film debut.

The film was an independent production of the Weisner Brothers for Eagle-Lion Films and released by United Artists.

== Plot ==
Deke Oliver and his wife Della host a weekly television show in New York, but their personal and professional relationships are strained. Della wants to adopt a child, but Deke does not. Their sponsor Seymour is threatening to discard their new five-year contract if they will not immediately sign it.

When adoption-agency officials appear, Deke tries to make them believe that he would be an unfit parent. When Della discovers his antics, she leaves him. With time running short before their next program, Deke spots an exact lookalike of Della on the street. He persuades the woman, Sylvia Latour, to impersonate Della on the show.

The scheme fools the audience, but Sylvia cannot remember her lines. Della takes pity on Deke and trades places with Sylvia, rescuing the program. Deke is grateful and changes his attitude about parenthood.

== Cast ==
- Robert Alda as Deke Oliver
- Janis Paige as Della Oliver/Sylvia Latour
- James Gleason as Max
- Lionel Stander as Seymour
- Arnold Stang as Bernard
