= Siobhán McKenna =

Irish actress (1922–1986)

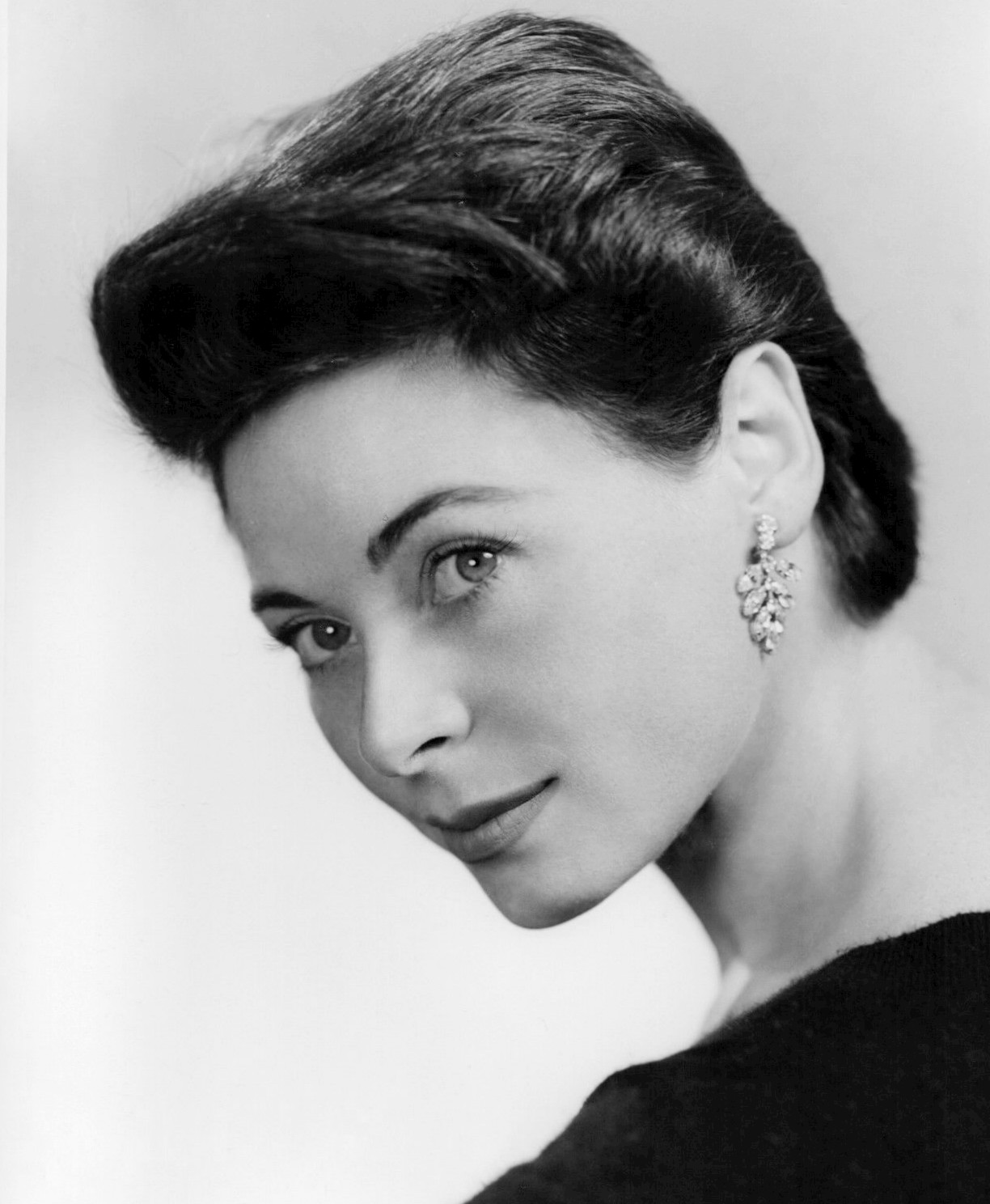
- McKenna in 1959
- Born: Siobhán Giollamhuire Nic Chionnaith; 24 May 1922; Belfast, Northern Ireland
- Died: 16 November 1986 (aged 64); Dublin, Ireland
- Occupation: Actress
- Years active: 1940–1985
- Spouse: Denis O'Dea (m. 1946; died 1978)

Siobhán McKenna (Irish: [ˈʃʊwaːn̪ˠ]; 24 May 1922 – 16 November 1986) was an Irish stage and screen actress.

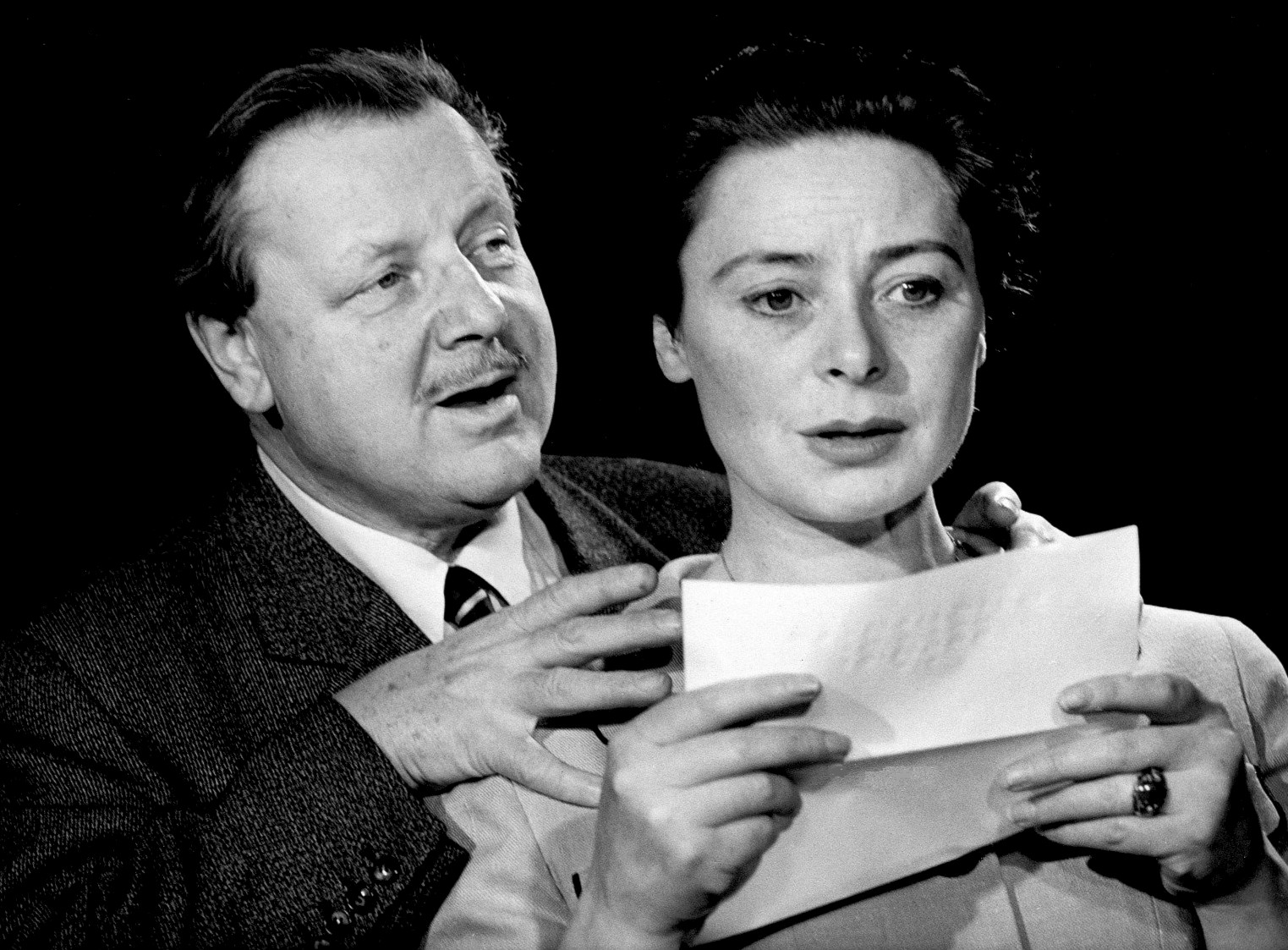
Walter Slezak and Siobhán McKenna from the 1960 presentation "Woman in White" on the anthology programme Dow Hour of Great Mysteries

== Early life ==
She was born Siobhán Giollamhuire Nic Chionnaith in Belfast in Northern Ireland into a Catholic and nationalist family. She grew up in Galway and in County Monaghan, speaking fluent Irish. Her father Eoghan McKenna (born Millstreet, County Cork, 1892) was Professor of Mathematics at University College, Galway (UCG). She was still in her teens when she became a member of an amateur Gaelic theatre group and made her stage debut at Galway's national Irish language theatre, An Taibhdhearc, in 1940.

== Career ==
She is remembered for her English language performances at the Abbey Theatre in Dublin where she would eventually star in what many consider her finest role in the George Bernard Shaw play, Saint Joan.

While performing at the Abbey Theatre in the 1940s, she met actor Denis O'Dea, whom she married in 1946. Until 1970 they lived in Richmond Street South, Dublin. They had one child, a son: Donnacha O'Dea, who swam for Ireland at the 1968 Summer Olympics and later won a World Series of Poker bracelet in 1998.

In 1955 she created the role of Miss Madrigal in Enid Bagnold's The Chalk Garden on Broadway. In 1956, she appeared in the Cambridge Drama Festival production of Saint Joan at the Off-Broadway Phoenix Theatre. Theatre critic Elliot Norton called her performance the finest portrayal of Joan in memory. Siobhán McKenna's popularity earned her the cover of Life on 10 September 1956. In 1957, she joined the acting company of the Stratford Festival in Canada, playing Viola in Twelfth Night. She received a second Tony Best Actress nomination for her role in the 1958 play The Rope Dancers, in which she starred with Art Carney and Joan Blondell. She performed her one-woman show Here Are Ladies in New York in 1971 and 1973, and appeared on Broadway in Christopher Isherwood's A Meeting by the River in 1979.

Although primarily a stage actress, McKenna appeared in a number of made-for-television films and dramas. She also appeared in several motion pictures such as King of Kings in 1961, as Virgin Mary. In 1964, she performed in Of Human Bondage and the following year in Doctor Zhivago. She also appeared in The Last Days of Pompeii, as Fortunata, wife of Gaius (Laurence Olivier), and in the movie version of Brian Friel's Philadelphia, Here I Come!

In 1979 McKenna appeared in the title role of Roald Dahl's "The Landlady", an episode of the British TV series Tales of The Unexpected.

McKenna was awarded the Gold Medal of the Éire Society of Boston, for having "significantly fulfilled the ideals of the Éire Society, in particular, spreading awareness of the cultural achievements of the Irish people".

== Death ==
Siobhán McKenna's final stage appearance came in the 1985 play Bailegangaire for the Druid Theatre Company. Despite surgery, she died of lung cancer the following year in Dublin, Ireland, at 64 years of age. Her body was buried at Rahoon Cemetery in County Galway. The inscription on the grave is in Irish.

In 1988, two years after her death, she was inducted into the American Theater Hall of Fame. The Siobhán McKenna Theatre, named in her honour, is in Cultúrlann McAdam Ó Fiaich in Belfast, the city of her birth.

The Siobhán McKenna Archive, documenting her life, is held in the Hardiman Library, University of Galway.

== Filmography ==
=== Film ===
Year	Title	Role	Notes
1947	Hungry Hill	Kate Donovan	
1948	Daughter of Darkness	Emily Beaudine	
1949	The Lost People	Marie	
1951	The Adventurers	Anne Hunter	
1961	King of Kings	Mary	
1963	The Playboy of the Western World	Pegeen Mike	
1964	Of Human Bondage	Nora Nesbitt	
1965	Doctor Zhivago	Anna	
1970	Philadelphia, Here I Come	Madge	
1984	Memed, My Hawk	Iroz	

=== Television ===
Year	Title	Role	Notes
1956	Producers' Showcase	Leslie Crosbie	Episode: "The Letter"
1979	Tales of The Unexpected	The Landlady (Title role)	Episode: "The Landlady"
1981	Tales of The Unexpected	Mrs Grady	Episode: "Vicious Circle"
1984	The Last Days of Pompeii (miniseries)	Fortunata	

== Recorded audio ==
- James Joyce - Ulysses: Soliloquies of Molly and Leopold Bloom (with E. G. Marshall). 1960 - Caedmon Records TC 1063. (Side One: Molly Bloom (McKenna); Side Two: Leopold Bloom (Marshall)
- James Joyce - Finnegan's Wake: Anna Livia Plurabelle - Caedmon TC 1086
- William Shakespeare - Twelfth Night (as Viola) - Caedmon SRS 213
- Eugene Ionesco - The Chairs - Caedmon TRS 323 c
- Siobhan McKenna Reads Irish Fairy Tales - Spoken Arts 720
- Tales of China and Tibet - Caedmon TC 1423

== See also ==
- List of people on the postage stamps of Ireland
