= They Walk Alone =

1938 play

- Original language: English
- Written by: Max Catto
- Genre: Thriller
- Setting: A farm near Lincoln

Premiere
- Date: 21 November 1938
- Place: Q Theatre, London

They Walk Alone is a 1938 thriller play by the British writer Max Catto. After premiering at the Q Theatre in Kew Bridge, it transferred to London's West End where it ran for 156 performances between 19 January and 3 June 1939 initially at the Shaftesbury Theatre before switching to the Comedy Theatre. The cast included Beckett Bould, Jimmy Hanley, Rene Ray, Carol Goodner and Beatrix Lehmann. It was produced by Berthold Viertel. It also ran for 21 performances at the Shubert Theatre on Broadway in 1941.

== Adaptation ==
In 1948 it was adapted into the film Daughter of Darkness directed by Lance Comfort and starring Anne Crawford, Maxwell Reed and Siobhán McKenna.

== Bibliography ==
- Goble, Alan. The Complete Index to Literary Sources in Film. Walter de Gruyter, 1999.
- Rigby, Jonathon. English Gothic: A Century of Horror Cinema. Reynolds & Hearn, 2004.
- Wearing, J. P. The London Stage 1930–1939: A Calendar of Productions, Performers, and Personnel. Rowman & Littlefield, 2014.
