= Gilbert O. Wymond Jr. =

American fighter pilot (1919–1949)

- Born: September 23, 1919; Louisville, Kentucky, U.S.
- Died: May 11, 1949 (aged 29); South Carolina, U.S.
- Burial place: Cave Hill Cemetery; Louisville, Kentucky, U.S.
- Military career
- Allegiance: United States of America
- Branch: United States Army Air Force
- Service years: 1940–1949
- Rank: Lieutenant colonel USAAF
- Nickname: Gil
- Commands: 65th Fighter Squadron, 57th Fighter Group; 55th Fighter Squadron, 20th Fighter Wing
- Conflicts: World War II
- Awards: Silver Star

Gilbert O. Wymond Jr. (1919–1949) was a United States Army Air Forces fighter pilot during World War II with service overseas in Africa and Italy campaigns. He was noted for his feature role in the filming of the documentary Thunderbolt (1947).

== Early life ==
Gilbert Osborne Wymond Jr. was born on September 23, 1919, in Louisville, Kentucky, to Gilbert Osborne Wymond and Lucille Graham Wymond. After attending the University of Kentucky for two years, on April 25, 1941, he enlisted in the Aviation Cadet Program of the United States Army Air Corps (USAAC).

== Military career ==
Wymond was commissioned a second lieutenant in the USAAC, and on December 12, 1941, awarded his pilot wings at Kelly Field, Texas, five days after the Attack on Pearl Harbor. His first assignment from December 1941 to July 1942 was as a fighter pilot, flying Curtiss P-40 Warhawks with the 65th Fighter Squadron of the 57th Fighter Group at Bradley Field, Trumbull Field and Rentschler Field, Connecticut.

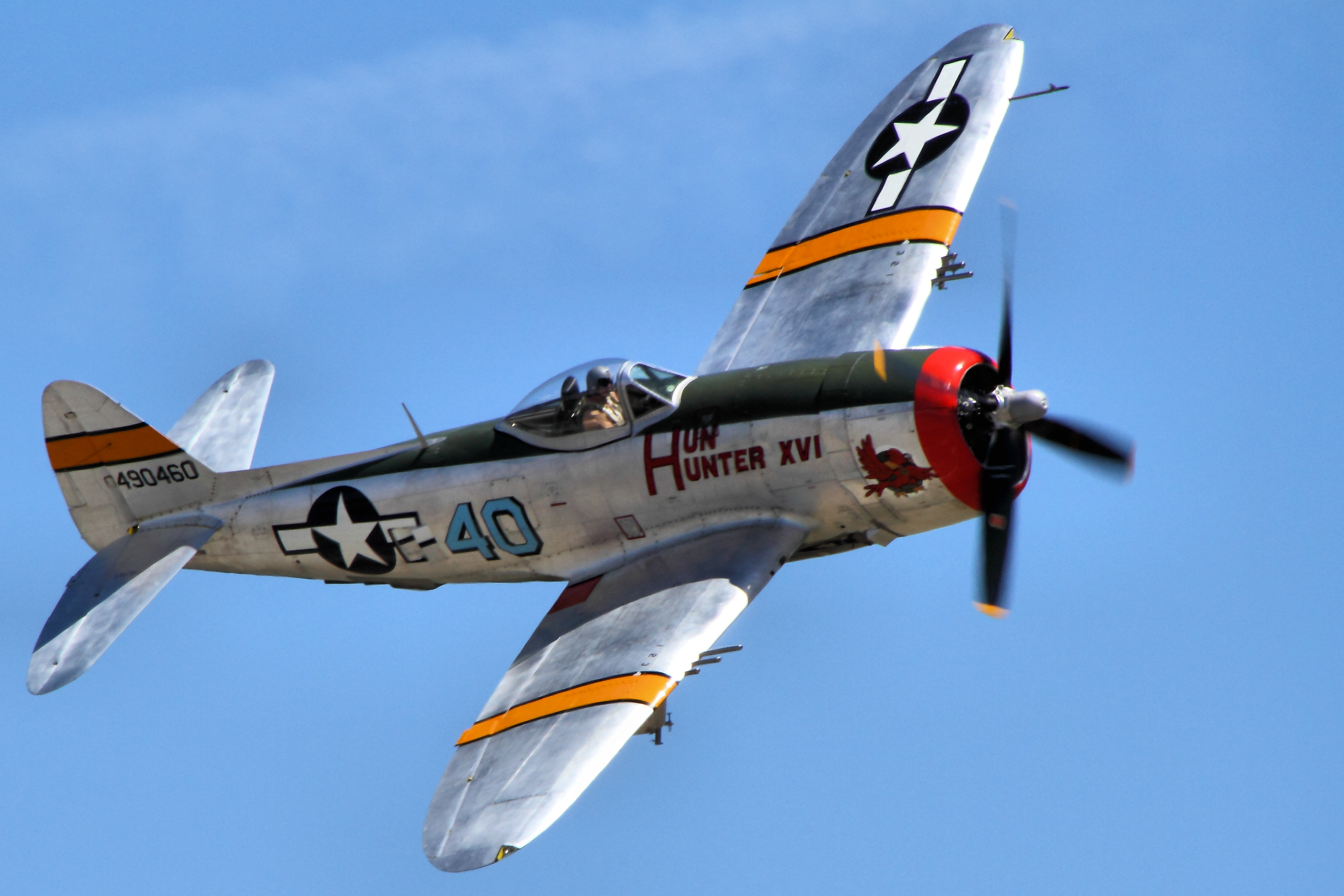
Restored P-47 in Wymond's markings as "Hun Hunter XVI".

=== Overseas service ===
Wymond deployed with his squadron aboard the aircraft carrier USS Ranger (CV-4). He took off from the carrier on July 19, 1942, landing at Accra in the Gold Coast before moving to Cairo, Egypt in August 1942. Between August 1942 and May 1945, promoted to captain and later, major and lieutenant colonel, Wymond moved with his squadron through Egypt, Libya, Tunisia, Malta, Sicily and Italy. During this period, the squadron transitioned from the P-40 to the Republic P-47 Thunderbolt.

During Wymond's operational deployment, he served as commanding officer of the 65th Fighter Squadron from May 13, 1943, to May 1945, with short periods on leave in the United States from July to September 1943, and May to June 1944. He flew 153 combat missions, and was credited with the destruction of three enemy aircraft, plus two probables, in aerial combat. His first Hun Hunter was P-40F 41-13947, and by the end of the war, Wymond was flying his 16th aircraft name "Hun Hunter XVI", a P-47D 44-90460.

For his action on May 2, 1944, Wymond was awarded the Silver Star. On part, the citation reads: "For gallantry in action as pilot of a P-47 aircraft ... at Rignano, Italy, Lieutenant Colonel Wymond observed activity in a concentration of factory buildings near Montevescala. Immediately leaving his formation, Lieutenant Colonel Wymond dived to minimum altitude in attack and as his accurate fire struck the objective, a tremendous explosion resulted destroying a factory containing large quantities of enemy ammunition. Displaying superior flying skill, Lieutenant Colonel Wymond regained control of his shattered plane and returned safely to base. His courage, selfless devotion to duty and outstanding proficiency as a combat pilot reflect great credit upon himself and the Military Service of the United States."

Wymond was recognized in an article in the February 2002 issue of Air Classics by the former armament chief of the 65th FS with being an early driving force in the development of the Thunderbolt from a high altitude escort fighter into the premier fighter-bomber of World War II.

In 1944, LtCol. Wymond, at 24 years of age and as commanding officer of the 65th Fighter squadron, took part in the filming of Thunderbolt, (released in 1947). The film was directed by William Wyler and John Sturges and documented the American aerial operations of Operation Strangle in World War II, when flyers of the Twelfth Air Force based on Corsica successfully impeded Axis supply lines to the Gustav Line and Anzio beachhead.

=== Postwar ===
After the war, Wymond completed jet transition training in the Lockheed F-80 Shooting Star and attended Air Command and Staff College at Maxwell AFB, Alabama. Lt Col. Wymond took command of the 55th Fighter Squadron at Shaw Air Force Base, South Carolina, in April 1949. Wymond was killed in the crash of his Republic F-84 Thunderjet on May 11, 1949.
