= Partition of Czechoslovakia =

Partition of Czechoslovakia may refer to:

- German occupation of Czechoslovakia
- Munich Agreement
- First Vienna Award
- Dissolution of Czechoslovakia
