= American Society of University Composers =

- Established: 1965 (61 years ago)
- Dissolved: 1989
- Types: professional association
- Country: United States

The American Society of University Composers was established in 1965. The first annual conference was held in New York in April 1966.

The American Society of University Composers is divided into regions, each with its own internal organizational structure. A chairman who belongs to the National Council is elected by regional members. At each conference annually, concerts, lectures and business meetings are held. The society have met in cities such as New York City, Philadelphia, St Louis.

The society published a regular Newsletter several times a year documenting the activities of university composers and performances throughout the United States
