= Max Catto =

English playwright and novelist (1907–1992)

Maxwell Jeffrey Catto
- Born: Mark Finkell; July 29, 1907; Manchester, England
- Died: March 12, 1992
- Education: University of Manchester
- Occupations: playwright, novelist
- Writing career
- Pen name: Simon Kent
- Notable work: adventure novels adapted for film including The Killing Frost

Maxwell Jeffrey Catto (29 July 1907 – 12 March 1992) was born Mark Finkell in Manchester, England and was an English playwright and novelist.

== Writing career ==
Catto wrote adventure novels and dramas for more than four decades and also wrote under the pseudonym Simon Kent. Ten of his works were adapted for film, the most notable of which was the novel The Killing Frost, which became Carol Reed's 1956 film Trapeze. Although he was a holder of a degree in electrical engineering from Manchester University, Catto began writing novels and plays in the late 1930s. After a stint in the Royal Air Force during World War II, Catto returned to writing fiction. Exotic settings and fast-paced action were the trademarks of his novels, defying categorization into any one genre, instead blending elements of many popular literary styles. Much of his work has been translated into other languages.

== Works ==
=== Novels under his own name ===
- River Junk – Arthur Barker, 1937
- The Hairy Man – M. Secker, 1939
- Ginger Charley – M. Secker, 1939
- The Flanagan Boy – Harrap, 1949 (made into the film The Flanagan Boy in 1953)
- The Killing Frost – Heinemann, 1950 (made into the film Trapeze in 1956 and consequently re-published as Trapeze by Landsborough in 1959)
- The Sickle – Heinemann, 1952
- The Mummers – Heinemann, 1953
- A Prize of Gold – Heinemann, 1953 (made into the film A Prize of Gold in 1955)
- Gold In The Sky – Heinemann, 1956, Morrow, 1958
- The Devil at Four O'Clock – Heinemann, 1958, Morrow, 1959 (made into the film The Devil at Four O'Clock in 1961)
- The Melody Of Sex – Heinemann, 1959, Morrow, 1960
- Mister Moses – Morrow, 1961 (made into the film Mister Moses in 1965)
- D-Day In Paradise – Heinemann, 1963, Morrow, 1964
- The Tiger In The Bed – Morrow, 1963
- I Have Friends In Heaven – Heinemann, 1965, Little, Brown, 1966
- Love From Venus – Heinemann, 1965
- Bird On The Wing – Heinemann, 1966
- The Banana Men – Simon & Schuster, 1967
- Murphy's War – Simon & Schuster, 1969 (made into the film Murphy's War in 1971)
- King Oil – Simon & Schuster, 1970
- The Fattest Bank In New Orleans – Heinemann, 1971
- Sam Casanova – Heinemann, 1973, Signet, 1977
- Mister Midas – M. Joseph, 1976
- The Empty Tiger – St. Martin's, 1977

=== Novels under the pseudonym Simon Kent ===
- Fleur-de-Lys Court – Heinemann, 1950
- For The Love Of Doc – Heinemann, 1951 (published in the US as The Doctor On Bean Street – Crowell, 1952)
- A Hill in Korea – Hutchinson, 1953 (made into the film A Hill in Korea in 1956)
- Fire Down Below – Hutchinson, 1954 (made into the film Fire Down Below in 1957)
- Ferry to Hong Kong – Hutchinson, 1957 (made into the film Ferry to Hong Kong in 1959)
- The Lions At The Kill – Hutchinson, 1959 (made into the film Seven Thieves in 1960)
- Charlie Gallagher My Love! – Hutchinson, 1960, Macmillan, 1961

=== Plays ===
- French Salad, 1934
- Green Waters, 1936
- They Walk Alone, 1938
- Punch without Judy, 1939
