= List of Harlequin Romance novels =

This is a list of Harlequin Romance novels containing books published by Harlequin by year. Publication began in 1949 with The Manatee by Nancy Bruff. This list contains only publications specifically within the Harlequin Romance listings.

== Listed by year ==
- 1949
- 1950
- 1951
- 1952
- 1953
- 1954
- 1955
- 1956
- 1957
- 1958
- 1959
- 1960
- 1961
- 1962
- 1963
- 1964
- 1965
- 1966
- 1967
- 1968
- 1969
- 1970
- 1971
- 1972
- 1973
- 1974
- 1975
- 1976
- 1977
- 1978
- 1979
- 1980
- 1981
- 1982
- 1983
- 1984
- 1985
- 1986
- 1987
- 1988
- 1989
- 1990
- 1991
- 1992
- 1993
- 1994
- 1995
- 1996
- 1997
- 1998
- 1999
- 2000
- 2001
- 2002
- 2003
- 2004
- 2005
- 2006
- 2007
- 2008
- 2009
- 2010
- 2011
- 2012
- 2013
- 2014
- 2015
- 2016
- 2017
- 2018

== Non-romances ==
The list includes more unusual publications, such as The Pocket Purity Cook Book and Livre de cuisine Purity: petit format, which featured Purity Flour Mills publications in a smaller size. #71, titled Bouquet Knitter's Guide, is another early example of Harlequin publishing a non-romance title under their Harlequin Romance brand. Harlequin #162, titled Health, Sex And Birth Control by Percy E. Ryberg, is another example of a Harlequin book that is not a novel, but is, instead, a woman's health book. #186, titled Why Be A Sucker?, is a book for investment in Canada. #391, titled How To Get More From Your Car, is a book for car owners.

There have been several reprints given new numerical releases, despite containing the same text. Gina, by George Albert Glay, was released three times by Harlequin as #19, #112, and #287 in the series.

== See also ==
- Romance novel
- List of romance comics
  - List of romance manga
