= List of Harlequin Romance novels released in 1985 =

List of Harlequin Romance novels published in 1985

This is a list of Harlequin Romance novels released in 1985. (Main index: List of Harlequin Romance novels)

== Releases ==
Number	Title	Author	Date	Citations
# 2665	Peter's Sister	Jeanne Allan	January 1985	
# 2666	Once For All Time	Betty Neels	January 1985	
# 2667	Darker Fire	Morgan Patterson	January 1985	
# 2668	Chateau Villon	Emily Spenser	January 1985	
# 2669	Tormented Rhapsody	Nicola West	January 1985	
# 2670	Catch A Falling Star	Rena Young	January 1985	
# 2671	The Passion And The Pain	Stacy Absalom	February 1985	
# 2672	The Turn Of The Tide	Samantha Day	February 1985	
# 2673	California Dreaming	Sara Francis	February 1985	
# 2674	The Scent of Hibiscus	Rosemary Hammond	February 1985	
# 2675	Silent Stream	Rowan Kirby	February 1985	
# 2676	Echo Of Betrayal	Valerie Marsh	February 1985	
# 2677	To Tame A Proud Lady	Mary Fowlkes	March 1985	
# 2678	Lovers' Knot	Marjorie Lewty	March 1985	
# 2679	Megan's Folly	Maura McGiveny	March 1985	
# 2680	Heidelberg Wedding	Betty Neels	March 1985	
# 2681	Where The Wind Blows Free	Emily Spenser	March 1985	
# 2682	Secret Fire	Violet Winspear	March 1985	
# 2683	Island Of Dolphins	Lillian Cheatham	April 1985	
# 2684	No Last Song	Ann Charlton	April 1985	
# 2685	Love's Good Fortune	Louise Harris	April 1985	
# 2686	Lake Haupiri Moon	Mary Moore	April 1985	
# 2687	No Honourable Compromise	Jessica Steele	April 1985	
# 2688	Winter In	Essie Summers	April 1985	
# 2689	Dark Night Dawning	Stacy Absalom	May 1985	
# 2690	Stag At Bay	Victoria Gordon	May 1985	
# 2691	A Time To Grow	Claudia Jameson	May 1985	
# 2692	Year's Happy Ending	Betty Neels	May 1985	
# 2693	Man And Wife	Valerie Parv	May 1985	
# 2694	Bride By Contract	Margaret Rome	May 1985	
# 2695	A Time Of Deception	Rosemary Badger	June 1985	
# 2696	Kingfisher Morning	Charlotte Lamb	June 1985	
# 2697	The Gabrielli Man	Jeneth Murrey	June 1985	
# 2698	A Tender Season	Sarah Keene	June 1985	
# 2699	Emperor Stone	Sheila Strutt	June 1985	
# 2700	Fallen Idol	Margaret Way	June 1985	
# 2701	Winter Sun, Summer Rain	Ann Charlton	July 1985	
# 2702	Ring Of Crystal	Jane Donnelly	July 1985	
# 2703	Never Kiss A Stranger	Mary Gabriel	July 1985	
# 2704	Dark-Night Encounter	Betsy Page	July 1985	
# 2705	Bluebeard's Bride	Sarah Holland	July 1985	
# 2706	Terebori's Gold	Lynsey Stevens	July 1985	
# 2707	On Wings Of Song	Mary Burchell	August 1985	
# 2708	Passion's Vine	Elizabeth Graham	August 1985	
# 2709	Ice Princess	Madeleine Ker	August 1985	
# 2710	Boss Of Brightlands	Miriam MacGregor	August 1985	
# 2711	Love In The Valley	Susan Napier	August 1985	
# 2712	A Summer Idyll	Betty Neels	August 1985	
# 2713	Southern Sunshine	Gloria Bevan	September 1985	
# 2714	Bushranger's Mountain	Victoria Gordon	September 1985	
# 2715	Big Sur	Elizabeth Graham	September 1985	
# 2716	Hostage	Madeleine Ker	September 1985	
# 2717	The Cotswold Lion	Annabel Murray	September 1985	
# 2718	A Rooted Sorrow	Nicola West	September 1985	
# 2719	Wrecker's Bride	Kathryn Cranmer	October 1985	
# 2720	Desirable Property	Catherine George	October 1985	
# 2721	Dare To Trust	Anne McAllister	October 1985	
# 2722	The Matchmaking Department	Dixie McKeone	October 1985	
# 2723	Sweet Vixen	Susan Napier	October 1985	
# 2724	Eagle's Ridge	Margaret Way	October 1985	
# 2725	Merringannee Bluff	Kerry Allyne	November 1985	
# 2726	After The Stars Fall	Bethany Campbell	November 1985	
# 2727	Cyclone Season	Victoria Gordon	November 1985	
# 2728	Return To Arkady	Jeneth Murrey	November 1985	
# 2729	At The End Of The Day	Betty Neels	November 1985	
# 2730	The Wyomian	Betsy Page	November 1985	
# 2731	Tears Of Gold	Helen Conrad	December 1985	
# 2732	Lord Of The Air	Carol Gregor	December 1985	
# 2733	Spring At Sevenoaks	Miriam MacGregor	December 1985	
# 2734	Wednesday's Child	Leigh Michaels	December 1985	
# 2735	Where The Gods Dwell	Celia Scott	December 1985	
# 2736	Wilderness Bride	Gwen Westwood	December 1985	
