= List of Harlequin Romance novels released in 2008 =

This is a list of Harlequin Romance novels released in 2008. (Main index: List of Harlequin Romance novels)

== Releases ==
Number	Title	Author	Date	Citations
#3997	Her Hand In Marriage	Jessica Steele	January 2008	
#3998	The Rancher's Doorstep Baby	Patricia Thayer	January 2008	
#3999	The Sheikh's Unsuitable Bride	Liz Fielding	January 2008	
#4000	The Bridesmaid's Best Man	Barbara Hannay	January 2008	
#4001	Moonlight And Roses	Jackie Braun	January 2008	
#4002	A Mother In A Million	Melissa James	January 2008	
#4003	Cattle Rancher, Secret Son	Margaret Way	February 2008	
#4004	Rescued By The Sheikh	Barbara McMahon	February 2008	
#4005	The Playboy's Plain Jane	Cara Colter	February 2008	
#4006	Her One And Only Valentine	Trish Wylie	February 2008	
#4007	English Lord, Ordinary Lady	Fiona Harper	February 2008	
#4008	Executive Mother-To-Be	Nicola Marsh	February 2008	
#4009	A Royal Marriage Of Convenience	Marion Lennox	March 2008	
#4010	The Italian Tycoon And The Nanny	Rebecca Winters	March 2008	
#4011	Promoted To Wife And Mother	Jessica Hart	March 2008	
#4012	Falling For The Rebel Heir	Ally Blake	March 2008	
#4013	To Love And To Cherish	Jennie Adams	March 2008	
#4014	The Soldier's Homecoming	Donna Alward	March 2008	
#4015	Wedding Bells At Wandering Creek Ranch	Patricia Thayer	April 2008	
#4016	The Bride's Baby	Liz Fielding	April 2008	
#4017	Sweetheart Lost And Found	Shirley Jump	April 2008	
#4018	Expecting A Miracle	Jackie Braun	April 2008	
#4019	The Single Dad's Patchwork Family	Claire Baxter	April 2008	
#4020	The Loner's Guarded Heart	Michelle Douglas	April 2008	
#4021	Coming Home To The Cattleman	Judy Christenberry	May 2008	
#4022	The Italian Playboy's Secret Son	Rebecca Winters	May 2008	
#4023	The Heir's Convenient Wife	Myrna Mackenzie	May 2008	
#4024	Her Sheikh Boss	Carol Grace	May 2008	
#4025	Wanted: White Wedding	Natasha Oakley	May 2008	
#4026	His Pregnant Housekeeper	Caroline Anderson	May 2008	
#4027	The Pregnancy Promise	Barbara McMahon	June 2008	
#4028	The Italian's Cinderella Bride	Lucy Gordon	June 2008	
#4029	SOS Marry Me!	Melissa McClone	June 2008	
#4030	Her Royal Wedding Wish	Cara Colter	June 2008	
#4031	Saying Yes To The Millionaire	Fiona Harper	June 2008	
#4032	Her Baby, His Proposal	Teresa Carpenter	June 2008	
#4033	Parents In Training	Barbara McMahon	July 2008	
#4034	Newlyweds of Convenience	Jessica Hart	July 2008	
#4035	Winning The Single Mom's Heart	Linda Goodnight	July 2008	
#4036	Adopted: Outback Baby	Barbara Hannay	July 2008	
#4037	The Desert Prince's Proposal	Nicola Marsh	July 2008	
#4038	Boardroom Bride And Groom	Shirley Jump	July 2008	
#4039	The Rancher's Inherited Family	Judy Christenberry	August 2008	
#4040	The Prince's Secret Bride	Raye Morgan	August 2008	
#4041	Millionaire Dad, Nanny Needed!	Susan Meier	August 2008	
#4042	Wanted: Royal Wife And Mother	Marion Lennox	August 2008	
#4043	The Boss's Unconventional Assistant	Jennie Adams	August 2008	
#4044	Falling For Mr. Dark And Dangerous	Donna Alward	August 2008	
#4045	Wedding At Wangaree Valley	Margaret Way	September 2008	
#4046	Abby And The Playboy Prince	Raye Morgan	September 2008	
#4047	The Bridegroom's Secret	Melissa James	September 2008	
#4048	Texas Ranger Takes A Bride	Patricia Thayer	September 2008	
#4049	Crazy About Her Spanish Boss	Rebecca Winters	September 2008	
#4050	The Millionaire's Proposal	Trish Wylie	September 2008	
#4051	Bride At Briar's Ridge	Margaret Way	October 2008	
#4052	Found: His Royal Baby	Raye Morgan	October 2008	
#4053	The Millionaire's Nanny Arrangement	Linda Goodnight	October 2008	
#4054	Last-Minute Proposal	Jessica Hart	October 2008	
#4055	Hired: The Boss's Bride	Ally Blake	October 2008	
#4056	The Single Mom And The Tycoon	Caroline Anderson	October 2008	
#4057	Her Millionaire, His Miracle	Myrna Mackenzie	November 2008	
#4058	Wedded In A Whirlwind	Liz Fielding	November 2008	
#4059	Rescued By The Magic Of Christmas	Melissa McClone	November 2008	
#4060	Blind Date With The Boss	Barbara Hannay	November 2008	
#4061	The Tycoon's Christmas Proposal	Jackie Braun	November 2008	
#4062	Christmas Wishes, Mistletoe Kisses	Fiona Harper	November 2008	
#4063	Cinderella And The Cowboy	Judy Christenberry	December 2008	
#4064	The Italian's Miracle Family	Lucy Gordon	December 2008	
#4065	His Mistletoe Bride	Cara Colter	December 2008	
#4066	Her Baby's First Christmas	Susan Meier	December 2008	
#4067	Marry-Me Christmas	Shirley Jump	December 2008	
#4068	Pregnant: Father Wanted	Claire Baxter	December 2008	
