= List of Harlequin Romance novels released in 2010 =

This is a Harlequin Romance novels released in 2010. (Main index: List of Harlequin Romance novels)

== Releases ==
Number	Title	Author	Date	Citations
#4141	The Italian's Forgotten Baby	Raye Morgan	January 2010	
#4142	The Daredevil Tycoon	Barbara McMahon	January 2010	
#4143	Just Married!: Kiss The Bridesmaid	Cara Colter	January 2010	
#4143	Just Married!: Best Man Says I Do	Shirley Jump	January 2010	
#4144	The Girl from Honeysuckle Farm	Jessica Steele	January 2010	
#4145	One Dance With The Cowboy	Donna Alward	January 2010	
#4146	Hired: Sassy Assistant	Nina Harrington	January 2010	
#4147	Rodeo Bride	Myrna MacKenzie	February 2010	
#4148	Cinderella On His Doorstep	Rebecca Winters	February 2010	
#4149	Her Prince's Secret Son	Linda Goodnight	February 2010	
#4150	Rescued In A Wedding Dress	Cara Colter	February 2010	
#4151	Accidentally Expecting!	Lucy Gordon	February 2010	
#4152	Lights, Camera...Kiss The Boss	Nikki Logan	February 2010	
#4153	Outback Bachelor	Margaret Way	March 2010	
#4154	Accidentally The Sheikh's Wife	Barbara McMahon	March 2010	
#4155	Sheriff Needs A Nanny	Teresa Carpenter	March 2010	
#4156	The Rancher's Adopted Family	Barbara Hannay	March 2010	
#4157	Oh-So-Sensible Secretary	Jessica Hart	March 2010	
#4158	Her Lone Cowboy	Donna Alward	March 2010	
#4159	Tough To Tame	Diana Palmer	April 2010	
#4160	Beauty And The Reclusive Prince	Raye Morgan	April 2010	
#4161	Marrying The Scarred Sheikh	Barbara McMahon	April 2010	
#4162	One Small Miracle	Melissa James	April 2010	
#4163	Australian Boss: Diamond Ring	Jennie Adams	April 2010	
#4164	Housekeeper's Happy-Ever-After	Fiona Harper	April 2010	
#4165	The No. 1 Sheriff In Texas	Patricia Thayer	May 2010	
#4166	Executive: Expecting Tiny Twins	Barbara Hannay	May 2010	
#4167	A Wedding At Leopard Tree Lodge	Liz Fielding	May 2010	
#4168	The Cattleman, The Baby And Me	Michelle Douglas	May 2010	
#4169	Mother of The Bride	Caroline Anderson	May 2010	
#4170	Tipping The Waitress With Diamonds	Nina Harrington	May 2010	
#4171	The Lionhearted Cowboy Returns	Patricia Thayer	June 2010	
#4172	Miracle For The Girl Next Door	Rebecca Winters	June 2010	
#4173	Three Times A Bridesmaid...	Nicola Marsh	June 2010	
#4174	Their Newborn Gift	Nikki Logan	June 2010	
#4175	Saving Cinderella!	Myrna MacKenzie	June 2010	
#4176	A Dinner, A Date, A Desert Sheikh	Jackie Braun	June 2010	
#4177	A Wish And A Wedding: Too Ordinary For The Duke?	Melissa James	July 2010	
#4177	A Wish And A Wedding: Master of Mallarinka	Margaret Way	July 2010	
#4178	The Bridesmaid's Secret	Fiona Harper	July 2010	
#4179	Maid For The Millionaire	Susan Meier	July 2010	
#4180	SOS: Convenient Husband Required	Liz Fielding	July 2010	
#4181	Vegas Pregnancy Surprise	Shirley Jump	July 2010	
#4182	Winning A Groom In 10 Dates	Cara Colter	July 2010	
#4183	Maid For The Single Dad	Susan Meier	August 2010	
#4184	The Cowboy's Adopted Daughter	Patricia Thayer	August 2010	
#4185	Doorstep Twins	Rebecca Winters	August 2010	
#4186	Cinderella: Hired By The Prince	Marion Lennox	August 2010	
#4187	Inconveniently Wed!	Jackie Braun	August 2010	
#4188	The Sheikh's Destiny	Melissa James	August 2010	
#4189	Australia's Most Eligible Bachelor	Margaret Way	September 2010	
#4190	Passionate Chef, Ice Queen Boss	Jennie Adams	September 2010	
#4191	Accidentally Pregnant!	Rebecca Winters	September 2010	
#4192	Sparks Fly With Mr. Mayor	Teresa Carpenter	September 2010	
#4193	Wedding Date With The Best Man	Melissa McClone	September 2010	
#4194	Deserted Island, Dreamy Ex!	Nicola Marsh	September 2010	
#4195	Cattle Baron Needs A Bride	Margaret Way	October 2010	
#4196	America's Star-crossed Sweethearts	Jackie Braun	October 2010	
#4197	Cowgirl Makes Three	Myrna MacKenzie	October 2010	
#4198	A Miracle For His Secret Son	Barbara Hannay	October 2010	
#4199	Juggling Briefcase & Baby	Jessica Hart	October 2010	
#4200	If The Red Slipper Fits...	Shirley Jump	October 2010	
#4201	Secret Prince, Instant Daddy!	Raye Morgan	November 2010	
#4202	Firefighter's Doorstep Baby	Barbara McMahon	November 2010	
#4203	A Fairytale Christmas: Baby Beneath The Christmas Tree	Susan Meier	November 2010	
#4203	A Fairytale Christmas: Magic Under The Mistletoe	Barbara Wallace	November 2010	
#4204	Christmas Magic on The Mountain	Melissa McClone	November 2010	
#4205	Christmas With Her Boss	Marion Lennox	November 2010	
#4206	Mistletoe And The Lost Stiletto	Liz Fielding	November 2010	
#4207	Single Father, Surprise Prince	Raye Morgan	December 2010	
#4208	Daddy By Christmas	Patricia Thayer	December 2010	
#4209	Rescued By His Christmas Angel	Cara Colter	December 2010	
#4210	The Cinderella Bride	Barbara Wallace	December 2010	
#4211	A Mistletoe Proposal	Lucy Gordon	December 2010	
#4212	Christmas At Candlebark Farm	Michelle Douglas	December 2010	
