= List of Harlequin Romance novels released in 1988 =

This is a list of Harlequin Romance novels released in 1988. (Main index: List of Harlequin Romance novels)

== Releases ==
Number	Title	Author	Date	Citations
# 2881	Dream Of Love	Kay Clifford	January 1988	
# 2882	Night Of The Spring Moon	Virginia Hart	January 1988	
# 2883	High Country Governess	Essie Summers	January 1988	
# 2884	Hidden Depths	Nicola West	January 1988	
# 2885	Bitter Deception	Gwen Westwood	January 1988	
# 2886	To Tame A Wild Heart	Quinn Wilder	January 1988	
# 2887	Love's Perjury	Mariana Francis	February 1988	
# 2888	The Chauvinist	Vanessa Grant	February 1988	
# 2889	Temporary Paragon	Emma Goldrick	February 1988	
# 2890	Autumn at Aubrey's	Miriam MacGregor	February 1988	
# 2891	The Doubtful Marriage	Betty Neels	February 1988	
# 2892	Entrance To Eden	Sue Peters	February 1988	
# 2893	When The Night Grows Cold	Lindsay Armstrong	March 1988	
# 2894	Black Diamond	Joanna Mansell	March 1988	
# 2895	Winter Stranger, Summer Lover	Barbara McMahon	March 1988	
# 2896	Man Shy	Valerie Parv	March 1988	
# 2897	To Love Them All	Eva Rutland	March 1988	
# 2898	Where Eagles Soar	Emily Spenser	March 1988	
# 2899	The Game Is Love	Jeanne Allan	April 1988	
# 2900	Blind Date	Emma Darcy	April 1988	
# 2901	Some Sort Of Spell	Frances Roding	April 1988	
# 2902	Gypsy Enchantment	Patricia Knoll	April 1988	
# 2903	Desperate Remedy	Angela Wells	April 1988	
# 2904	Daughter Of The Stars	Quinn Wilder	April 1988	
# 2905	Forecast Of Love	Katherine Arthur	May 1988	
# 2906	No Place To Run	Jane Donnelly	May 1988	
# 2907	Harmonies	Rowan Kirby	May 1988	
# 2908	The Buttercup Dream	Monica Martin	May 1988	
# 2909	Sapphire Nights	Valerie Parv	May 1988	
# 2910	Captive Lover	Kate Walker	May 1988	
# 2911	Flirtation River	Bethany Campbell	June 1988	
# 2912	Recipe For Love	Kay Clifford	June 1988	
# 2913	Clouded Paradise	Rachel Ford	June 1988	
# 2914	A Gentle Awakening	Betty Neels	June 1988	
# 2915	Capture A Nightingale	Sue Peters	June 1988	
# 2916	Unfriendly Alliance	Jessica Steele	June 1988	
# 2917	The Healing Effect	Deborah Davis	July 1988	
# 2918	An Unlikely Combination	Anne Marie Duquette	July 1988	
# 2919	A Star For A Ring	Kay Gregory	July 1988	
# 2920	Man Of Shadows	Kate Walker	July 1988	
# 2921	Fortune's Fool	Angela Wells	July 1988	
# 2922	Bid for Independence	Yvonne Whittal	July 1988	
# 2923	There Must Be Love	Samantha Day	August 1988	
# 2924	Man Of Iron	Catherine George	August 1988	
# 2925	Impossible To Forget	Sally Heywood	August 1988	
# 2926	Tarik's Mountain	Dana James	August 1988	
# 2927	A Golden Touch	Mary Moore	August 1988	
# 2928	Fortunes Of Love	Jessica Steele	August 1988	
# 2929	Losing Battle	Kerry Allyne	September 1988	
# 2930	The Black Sheep	Susan Fox	September 1988	
# 2931	Rider Of The Hills	Miriam MacGregor	September 1988	
# 2932	Heart's Treasure	Annabel Murray	September 1988	
# 2933	The Course Of True Love	Betty Neels	September 1988	
# 2934	Snowy River Man	Valerie Parv	September 1988	
# 2935	Trust In Love	Jeanne Allan	October 1988	
# 2936	Playing Safe	Claudia Jameson	October 1988	
# 2937	Feelings	Margaret Mayo	October 1988	
# 2938	One-Woman Man	Sue Peters	October 1988	
# 2939	Morning Glory	Margaret Way	October 1988	
# 2940	Neptune's Daughter	Anne Weale	October 1988	
# 2941	Whirlpool Of Passion	Emma Darcy	November 1988	
# 2942	This Time Round	Catherine George	November 1988	
# 2943	To Tame A Tycoon	Emma Goldrick	November 1988	
# 2944	At First Sight	Eva Rutland	November 1988	
# 2945	Catch A Dream	Celia Scott	November 1988	
# 2946	A Not-So-Perfect Marriage	Edwina Shore	November 1988	
# 2947	Beneath Wimmera Skies	Kerry Allyne	December 1988	
# 2948	Send Me No Flowers	Katherine Arthur	December 1988	
# 2949	The Diamond Trap	Bethany Campbell	December 1988	
# 2950	You Can Love A Stranger	Charlotte Lamb	December 1988	
# 2951	Strictly Business	Leigh Michaels	December 1988	
# 2952	Colour The Sky Red	Annabel Murray	December 1988	
