= List of Harlequin Romance novels released in 2003 =

This is a list of Harlequin Romance novels released in 2003. (Main index: List of Harlequin Romance novels)

== Releases ==
Number	Title	Author	Date	Citations
# 3731	Maybe Married	Leigh Michaels	January 2003	
# 3732	Assignment: Single Father	Caroline Anderson	January 2003	
# 3733	The Pregnancy Bond	Lucy Gordon	January 2003	
# 3734	The Sheikh's Proposal	Barbara McMahon	January 2003	
# 3735	City Girl In Training	Liz Fielding	February 2003	
# 3736	The Wedding Challenge	Jessica Hart	February 2003	
# 3737	Forever Wife And Mother	Grace Green	February 2003	
# 3738	Nanny By Chance	Betty Neels	February 2003	
# 3739	Bride Fit For A Prince	Rebecca Winters	March 2003	
# 3740	The Prodigal Wife	Susan Fox	March 2003	
# 3741	An Accidental Engagement	Jessica Steele	March 2003	
# 3742	A Millionaire For Molly	Marion Lennox	March 2003	
# 3743	Rush To The Altar	Rebecca Winters	April 2003	
# 3744	The Venetian Playboy's Bride	Lucy Gordon	April 2003	
# 3745	Her Marriage Secret	Darcy Maguire	April 2003	
# 3746	Discovering Daisy	Betty Neels	April 2003	
# 3747	The Independent Bride	Sophie Weston	March 2003	
# 3748	The Marriage Market	Leigh Michaels	May 2003	
# 3749	The Bridesmaid's Reward	Liz Fielding	May 2003	
# 3750	Her Secret Millionaire	Jodi Dawson	May 2003	
# 3751	The Italian Millionaire's Marriage	Lucy Gordon	June 2003	
# 3752	Surrender To A Playboy	Renee Roszel	June 2003	
# 3753	The Tycoon Prince	Barbara McMahon	June 2003	
# 3754	Accidental Bride	Darcy Maguire	June 2003	
# 3755	Manhattan Merger	Rebecca Winters	July 2003	
# 3756	With This Baby...	Caroline Anderson	July 2003	
# 3757	Fiancé Wanted Fast!	Jessica Hart	July 2003	
# 3758	A Good Wife	Betty Neels	July 2003	
# 3759	The Billionaire Bid	Leigh Michaels	August 2003	
# 3760	The Tuscan Tycoon's Wife	Lucy Gordon	August 2003	
# 3761	The Blind-Date Proposal	Jessica Hart	August 2003	
# 3762	Baby Chase	Hannah Bernard	August 2003	
# 3763	A Paper Marriage	Jessica Steele	September 2003	
# 3764	Contract Bride	Susan Fox	September 2003	
# 3765	A Whirlwind Engagement	Jessica Hart	September 2003	
# 3766	Their Miracle Baby	Jodi Dawson	September 2003	
# 3767	Runaway Wife	Margaret Way	October 2003	
# 3768	The Forbidden Marriage	Rebecca Winters	October 2003	
# 3769	The Baby Bonding	Caroline Anderson	October 2003	
# 3770	A Parisian Proposition	Barbara Hannay	October 2003	
# 3771	Outback Bridegroom	Margaret Way	November 2003	
# 3772	The Bride Assignment	Leigh Michaels	November 2003	
# 3773	The Ordinary Princess	Liz Fielding	November 2003	
# 3774	Their Accidental Baby	Hannah Bernard	November 2003	
# 3775	Outback Surrender	Margaret Way	December 2003	
# 3776	The Accidental Mistress	Sophie Weston	December 2003	
# 3777	The Marriage Command	Susan Fox	December 2003	
# 3778	A Bride For The Holidays	Renee Roszel	December 2003	
