= List of Harlequin Romance novels released in 1983 =

Novels released by Canadian publisher

This is a list of Harlequin Romance novels released in 1983. (Main index: List of Harlequin Romance novels)

== Releases ==
Number	Title	Author	Date	Citations
# 2521	Ross's Girl	Jane Corrie	January 1983	
# 2522	The Distance Man	Samantha Harvey	January 1983	
# 2523	Lesson In Love	Claudia Jameson	January 1983	
# 2524	New Boss At Birchfields	Henrietta Reid	January 1983	
# 2525	Daughter Of The Misty Gorges	Essie Summers	January 1983	
# 2526	Devil's Gold	Nicola West	January 1983	
# 2527	Spring Fever	Kerry Allyne	February 1983	
# 2528	Masquerade With Music	Mary Burchell	February 1983	
# 2529	To Be Or Not To Be	Sue Byfield	February 1983	
# 2530	Jungle Antagonist	Diana Gair	February 1983	
# 2531	Dinner At Wyatt's	Victoria Gordon	February 1983	
# 2532	Peacock In The Jungle	Wynne May	February 1983	
# 2533	Moonlight Enough	Sandra Clark	March 1983	
# 2534	My Lord Kasseem	Mons Daveson	March 1983	
# 2535	Reluctant Paragon	Catherine George	March 1983	
# 2536	Lupin Valley	Roumelia Lane	March 1983	
# 2537	Spellbound	Margaret Way	March 1983	
# 2538	House Of Mirrors	Yvonne Whittal	March 1983	
# 2539	The Silver Veil	Margaret Way	April 1983	
# 2540	Battle Of Wills	Victoria Gordon	April 1983	
# 2541	Boy With Kite	Samantha Harvey	April 1983	
# 2542	All Else Confusion	Betty Neels	April 1983	
# 2543	The White Wave	Jocelyn Giffin	April 1983	
# 2544	Suspicion	Jo Sullivan	April 1983	
# 2545	Handmaid To Midas	Jane Arbor	May 1983	
# 2546	Makeshift Marriage	Marjorie Lewty	May 1983	
# 2547	All Our Tomorrows	Jan MacLean	May 1983	
# 2548	Wayside Flower	Wynne May	May 1983	
# 2549	Roots Of Heaven	Annabel Murray	May 1983	
# 2550	A Dream Come True	Betty Neels	May 1983	
# 2551	Man With Two Faces	Jane Corrie	June 1983	
# 2552	Call Up The Storm	Jane Donnelly	June 1983	
# 2553	Rapture Of The Deep	Margaret Rome	June 1983	
# 2554	Catch A Star	Alexandra Scott	June 1983	
# 2555	Distrust Her Shadow	Jessica Steele	June 1983	
# 2556	Hunter's Moon	Margaret Way	June 1983	
# 2557	Dangerous Journey	Margaret Mayo	July 1983	
# 2558	Keegan's Kingdom	Annabel Murray	July 1983	
# 2559	Tame A Proud Heart	Jeneth Murrey	July 1983	
# 2560	Summerhaze	Kate O'Hara	July 1983	
# 2561	Lord of the Land	Margaret Rome	July 1983	
# 2562	The Flight Of The Golden Hawk	Sheila Strutt	July 1983	
# 2563	The Rouseabout Girl	Gloria Bevan	August 1983	
# 2564	Lions Walk Alone	Susanna Firth	August 1983	
# 2565	The Melting Heart	Claudia Jameson	August 1983	
# 2566	Midsummer Star	Betty Neels	August 1983	
# 2567	Forsaking All Other	Jeneth Murrey	August 1983	
# 2568	Seeds of April	Celia Scott	August 1983	
# 2569	Stormy Weather	Sandra Clark	September 1983	
# 2570	Not The Marrying Kind	Helen Dalzell	September 1983	
# 2571	Dream Of Midsummer	Catherine George	September 1983	
# 2572	The Man From Ti Kouka	Rosalie Henaghan	September 1983	
# 2573	The Candleberry Tree	Pamela Pope	September 1983	
# 2574	Closest Place To Heaven	Lynsey Stevens	September 1983	
# 2575	Mackenzie Country	Mons Daveson	October 1983	
# 2576	Face The Tiger	Jane Donnelly	October 1983	
# 2577	The Tides Of Summer	Sandra Field	October 1983	
# 2578	Never Say Never	Claudia Jameson	October 1983	
# 2579	One Who Kisses	Marjorie Lewty	October 1983	
# 2580	Tethered Liberty	Jessica Steele	October 1983	
# 2581	Knave Of Hearts	Stacy Absalom	November 1983	
# 2582	Perhaps Love	Lindsay Armstrong	November 1983	
# 2583	Lightning Strikes Twice	Sue Peters	November 1983	
# 2584	Bay Of Angels	Margaret Rome	November 1983	
# 2585	Love Comes Stealing	Alexandra Scott	November 1983	
# 2586	Secondhand Bride	Gwen Westwood	November 1983	
# 2587	Dangerous Male	Marjorie Lewty	December 1983	
# 2588	Mayan Magic	Laura McGrath	December 1983	
# 2589	The Tall Dark Stranger	Valerie Parv	December 1983	
# 2590	A Mountain For Luenda	Essie Summers	December 1983	
# 2591	The Girl At Cobalt Creek	Margaret Way	December 1983	
# 2592	No Room In His Life	Nicola West	December 1983	
