= List of Harlequin Romance novels released in 1998 =

This is a list of Harlequin Romance novels released in 1998. (Main index: List of Harlequin Romance novels)

== Releases ==
| Number | Title | Author | Date | Citations |
|---|---|---|---|---|
| # 3487 | Marry In Haste | Heather Allison | January 1998 | |
| # 3488 | Married By Mistake! | Renee Roszel | January 1998 | |
| # 3489 | Undercover Husband | Rebecca Winters | January 1998 | |
| # 3490 | The Wedding Trap | Eva Rutland | January 1998 | |
| # 3491 | Dash To The Altar | Ruth Jean Dale | February 1998 | |
| # 3492 | Marrying Mary | Betty Neels | February 1998 | |
| # 3493 | Bargaining With The Boss | Catherine George | February 1998 | |
| # 3494 | McTavish And Twins | Trisha David | February 1998 | |
| # 3495 | The Twenty-Four Hour Bride | Day Leclaire | March 1998 | |
| # 3496 | The Billionaire Date | Leigh Michaels | March 1998 | |
| # 3497 | Marriage On His Terms | Val Daniels | March 1998 | |
| # 3498 | Rachel And The Tough Guy | Jeanne Allan | March 1998 | |
| # 3499 | Married In A Moment | Jessica Steele | April 1998 | |
| # 3500 | The Playboy Assignment | Leigh Michaels | April 1998 | |
| # 3501 | Rent-A-Cowboy | Barbara McMahon | April 1998 | |
| # 3502 | Another Chance for Daddy | Patricia Knoll | April 1998 | |
| # 3503 | Baby In A Million | Rebecca Winters | May 1998 | |
| # 3504 | The Husband Project | Leigh Michaels | May 1998 | |
| # 3505 | One Bride Required! | Emma Richmond | May 1998 | |
| # 3506 | Almost A Father | Pamela Bauer and Judy | May 1998 | |
| # 3507 | Beresford's Bride | Margaret Way | June 1998 | |
| # 3508 | The Boss, The Baby And The Bride | Day Leclaire | June 1998 | |
| # 3509 | A Wedding In The Family | Susan Fox | June 1998 | |
| # 3510 | Mail-Order Mother | Kate Denton | June 1998 | |
| # 3511 | Birthday Bride | Jessica Hart | July 1998 | |
| # 3512 | A Kiss For Julie | Betty Neels | July 1998 | |
| # 3513 | The Bachelor And The Babies | Heather MacAllister | July 1998 | |
| # 3514 | Last Chance Marriage | Rosemary Gibson | July 1998 | |
| # 3515 | The Diamond Dad | Lucy Gordon | August 1998 | |
| # 3516 | Heavenly Husband | Carolyn Greene | August 1998 | |
| # 3517 | The Trouble With Trent | Jessica Steele | August 1998 | |
| # 3518 | The Million-Dollar Marriage | Eva Rutland | August 1998 | |
| # 3519 | Bride By Day | Rebecca Winters | September 1998 | |
| # 3520 | The Bartered Bride | Anne Weale | September 1998 | |
| # 3521 | Wanted: Perfect Wife | Barbara McMahon | September 1998 | |
| # 3522 | The Courting Campaign | Catherine George | September 1998 | |
| # 3523 | The Miracle Wife | Day Leclaire | October 1998 | |
| # 3524 | A Groom For Gwen | Jeanne Allan | October 1998 | |
| # 3525 | Temporary Girlfriend | Jessica Steele | October 1998 | |
| # 3526 | The Wedding Promise | Grace Green | October 1998 | |
| # 3527 | The Vicar's Daughter | Betty Neels | November 1998 | |
| # 3528 | Her Mistletoe Husband | Renee Roszel | November 1998 | |
| # 3529 | Be My Girl! | Lucy Gordon | November 1998 | |
| # 3530 | Wedding Bells | Patricia Knoll | November 1998 | |
| # 3531 | Ready-Made Bride | Janelle Denison | December 1998 | |
| # 3532 | Gabriel's Mission | Margaret Way | December 1998 | |
| # 3533 | One Night Before Christmas | Catherine Leigh | December 1998 | |
| # 3534 | Santa's Special Delivery | Val Daniels | December 1998 | |
