= List of Harlequin Romance novels released in 1993 =

This is a list of Harlequin Romance novels released in 1993. (Main index: List of Harlequin Romance novels)

== Releases ==
Number	Title	Author	Date	Citations
# 3241	Images Of Desire	Anne Beaumont	January 1993	
# 3242	Showdown!	Ruth Jean Dale	January 1993	
# 3243	After The Roses	Kay Gregory	January 1993	
# 3244	Norah	Debbie Macomber	January 1993	
# 3245	No Gentleman	Kate Walker	January 1993	
# 3246	Torrid Conflict	Angela Wells	January 1993	
# 3247	A Roman Marriage	Stephanie Howard	February 1993	
# 3248	Safe In My Heart	Leigh Michaels	February 1993	
# 3249	Romantic Encounter	Betty Neels	February 1993	
# 3250	Pure And Simple	Peggy Nicholson	February 1993	
# 3251	A Bride For Ransom	Renee Roszel	February 1993	
# 3252	Guilty Of Love	Jennifer Taylor	February 1993	
# 3253	Rescued By Love	Anne Marie Duquette	March 1993	
# 3254	Growing Attraction	Ellen James	March 1993	
# 3255	The Orchard King	Miriam MacGregor	March 1993	
# 3256	Destined To Meet	Jessica Steele	March 1993	
# 3257	The Singing Tree	Anne Weale	March 1993	
# 3258	Ride A Storm	Quinn Wilder	March 1993	
# 3259	Temporary Arrangement	Shannon Waverly	April 1993	
# 3260	Add A Little Spice	Bethany Campbell	April 1993	
# 3261	Out Of The Storm	Catherine George	April 1993	
# 3262	No Provocation	Sophie Weston	April 1993	
# 3263	Ties That Blind	Leigh Michaels	May 1993	
# 3264	The Real McCoy	Patricia Knoll	May 1993	
# 3265	Hero On The Loose	Rebecca Winters	May 1993	
# 3266	Barrier To Love	Rosemary Hammond	May 1993	
# 3267	A Happy Meeting	Betty Neels	June 1993	
# 3268	The Bad Penny	Susan Fox	June 1993	
# 3269	Ivy's League	Heather Allison	June 1993	
# 3270	The Perfect Bride	Jasmine Cresswell	June 1993	
# 3271	Lone Star Lovin'	Debbie Macomber	July 1993	
# 3272	Pet Peeves	Virginia Hart	July 1993	
# 3273	Devon's Desire	Quinn Wilder	July 1993	
# 3274	Habit Of Command	Sophie Weston	July 1993	
# 3275	The Lake Effect	Leigh Michaels	August 1993	
# 3276	Stubborn As A Mule	Roz Denny	August 1993	
# 3277	The Lady And The Tomcat	Bethany Campbell	August 1993	
# 3278	Last Summer's Girl	Elizabeth Barnes	August 1993	
# 3279	The Quiet Professor	Betty Neels	September 1993	
# 3280	The Rancher And The Redhead	Rebecca Winters	September 1993	
# 3281	No Objections	Kate Denton	September 1993	
# 3282	Reluctant Lover	Katherine Arthur	September 1993	
# 3283	Foreign Affair	Eva Rutland	October 1993	
# 3284	Haunted Spouse	Heather Allison	October 1993	
# 3285	To Catch A Ghost	Day Leclaire	October 1993	
# 3286	The Cowboy Next Door	Jeanne Allan	October 1993	
# 3287	An Old-Fashioned Guy	Betty Neels	November 1993	
# 3288	Ready For Romance	Debbie Macomber	November 1993	
# 3289	On The Line	Anne Marie Duquette	November 1993	
# 3290	Dating Games	Leigh Michaels	November 1993	
# 3291	Home For Christmas	Ellen James	December 1993	
# 3292	Christmas Angel	Shannon Waverly	December 1993	
# 3293	The Man Who Came For Christmas	Bethany Campbell	December 1993	
# 3294	Hungarian Rhapsody	Jessica Steele	December 1993	
