= List of Harlequin Romance novels released in 1969 =

This is a list of Harlequin Romance novels released in 1969. (Main index: List of Harlequin Romance novels)

== Releases ==
Number	Title	Author	Date	Citations
# 1265	Strange As A Dream	Flora Kidd	January 1969	
# 1266	Where No Stars Shine	Ivy Ferrari	January 1969	
# 1267	Court Of The Veils	Violet Winspear	January 1969	
# 1268	Dark Star	Nerina Hilliard	January 1969	
# 1269	Pretence	Roberta Leigh	January 1969	
# 1270	Though Worlds Apart	Mary Burchell	January 1969	
# 1271	The Man In Command	Anne Weale	January 1969	
# 1272	Devon Interlude	Kay Thorpe	January 1969	
# 1273	The Surgeon Takes a Wife / If They Could Only Forget	Marjorie Norrell	February 1969	
# 1274	Man From The Sea	Pamela Kent	February 1969	
# 1275	Shake Out The Stars	Janice Gray	February 1969	
# 1276	Steeple Ridge	Jill Tahourdin	February 1969	
# 1277	Stranger's Trespass	Jane Arbor	February 1969	
# 1278	The King Of The Castle	Anita Charles	February 1969	
# 1279	Gather Then the Rose	Hilda Nickson	February 1969	
# 1280	The Flight Of The Swan	Eleanor Farnes	February 1969	
# 1281	Nurse Sally's Last Chance	Anne Durham	March 1969	
# 1282	The Shining Star	Hilary Wilde	March 1969	
# 1283	Rosalind Comes Home	Essie Summers	March 1969	
# 1284	Only My Heart to Give	Nan Asquith	March 1969	
# 1285	Out Of A Dream	Jean Curtis	March 1969	
# 1286	Be More Than Dreams	Elizabeth Hoy	March 1969	
# 1287	The Walled Garden	Margaret Malcolm	March 1969	
# 1288	The Last Of The Kintyres	Catherine Airlie	March 1969	
# 1289	The Much-Loved Nurse	Pauline Ash	April 1969	
# 1290	A Summer To Love	Roumelia Lane	April 1969	
# 1291	Master Of Glenkeith	Jean S. MacLeod	April 1969	
# 1292	Falcon's Keep	Henrietta Reid	April 1969	
# 1293	I Know My Love	Sara Seale	April 1969	
# 1294	The Breadth Of Heaven	Rosemary Pollock	April 1969	
# 1295	Suddenly, It Was Spring	Hilda Pressley	April 1969	
# 1296	The Wind And The Spray	Joyce Dingwell	April 1969	
# 1297	Dental Nurse at Denley's	Marjorie Lewty	May 1969	
# 1298	Missing From Home	Mary Burchell	May 1969	
# 1299	The Listening Palms	Juliet Shore	May 1969	
# 1300	A Kiss In A Gondola	Katrina Britt	May 1969	
# 1301	Hotel By The Loch	Iris Danbury	May 1969	
# 1302	Teachers Must Learn	Nerina Hilliard	May 1969	
# 1303	Still Waters	Marguerite Lees	May 1969	
# 1304	Sharlie For Short	Dorothy Rivers	May 1969	
# 1305	Doctor Geyer's Project / The Project and the Lady	Marjorie Norrell	June 1969	
# 1306	A Handful Of Silver	Isobel Chace	June 1969	
# 1307	A Chance To Win	Margaret Rome	June 1969	
# 1308	A Mist In Glen Torran	Amanda Doyle	June 1969	
# 1309	The Hills Of Maketu	Gloria Bevan	June 1969	
# 1310	Tawny Are The Leaves	Wynne May	June 1969	
# 1311	The Marriage Wheel	Susan Barrie	June 1969	
# 1312	Peppercorn Harvest	Ivy Ferrari	June 1969	
# 1313	Mann Of The Medical Wing	Anne Durham	July 1969	
# 1314	Summer Island	Jean S. MacLeod	July 1969	
# 1315	Where The Kowhai Blooms	Mary Moore	July 1969	
# 1316	Can This Be Love?	Margaret Malcolm	July 1969	
# 1317	Beloved Sparrow	Henrietta Reid	July 1969	
# 1318	Palace Of The Peacocks	Violet Winspear	July 1969	
# 1319	Brittle Bondage	Rosalind Brett	July 1969	
# 1320	Spanish Lace	Joyce Dingwell	July 1969	
# 1321	Bush Hospital / Thread of Gold	Gladys Fullbrook	August 1969	
# 1322	Wind Through the Vineyard	Juliet Armstrong	August 1969	
# 1323	Moonlight On The Water	Hilda Nickson	August 1969	
# 1324	Queen Of Hearts	Sara Seale	August 1969	
# 1325	No Sooner Loved	Pauline Garnar	August 1969	
# 1326	Meet On My Ground	Essie Summers	August 1969	
# 1327	More Than Gold	Hilda Pressley	August 1969	
# 1328	A Wind Sighing	Catherine Airlie	August 1969	
# 1329	Nurse Lister's Millstone / The Unexpected Millstone	Marjorie Norrell	September 1969	
# 1330	A Home For Joy	Mary Burchell	September 1969	
# 1331	Hotel Belvedere	Iris Danbury	September 1969	
# 1332	Don't Walk Alone	Jane Donnelly	September 1969	
# 1333	Keeper Of The Heart	Gwen Westwood	September 1969	
# 1334	The Damask Rose	Isobel Chace	September 1969	
# 1335	The Red Cliffs	Eleanor Farnes	September 1969	
# 1336	The Cypress Garden	Jane Arbor	September 1969	
# 1337	The Campbells Are Coming	Felicity Hayle	October 1969	
# 1338	Sea Of Zanj	Roumelia Lane	October 1969	
# 1339	Slave Of The Wind	Jean S. MacLeod	October 1969	
# 1340	The House Of Yesterday	Margaret Malcolm	October 1969	
# 1341	Fire Is For Sharing	Doris E. Smith	October 1969	
# 1342	The Feel of Silk	Joyce Dingwell	October 1969	
# 1343	Tamboti Moon	Wynne May	October 1969	
# 1344	The Dangerous Delight	Violet Winspear	October 1969	
# 1345	Three Nurses	Louise Ellis	November 1969	
# 1346	A House Called Kangaroo	Gladys Fullbrook	November 1969	
# 1347	The Truant Spirit	Sara Seale	November 1969	
# 1348	Revolt, And Virginia	Essie Summers	November 1969	
# 1349	Eternal Summer	Anne Hampson	November 1969	
# 1350	Above Rubies	Mary Cummins	November 1969	
# 1351	The Girl For Gillgong	Amanda Doyle	November 1969	
# 1352	The Mountain Of Stars	Catherine Airlie	November 1969	
# 1353	Nurse Lavinia's Mistake	Marjorie Norrell	December 1969	
# 1354	When Love's Beginning	Mary Burchell	December 1969	
# 1355	Rising Star	Kay Thorpe	December 1969	
# 1356	The Man At Marralomeda	Hilary Wilde	December 1969	
# 1357	Ripples In The Lake	May Coates	December 1969	
# 1358	Home To White Wings	Jean Dunbar	December 1969	
# 1359	Return To Tremarth	Susan Barrie	December 1969	
# 1360	This Desirable Residence	Hilda Nickson	December 1969	
