= List of Harlequin Romance novels released in 2005 =

This is a list of Harlequin Romance novels released in 2005. (Main index: List of Harlequin Romance novels)

== Releases ==
Number	Title	Author	Date	Citations
# 3827	To Win His Heart	Rebecca Winters	January 2005	
# 3828	The Bride Prize	Susan Fox	January 2005	
# 3829	The Dating Resolution	Hannah Bernard	January 2005	
# 3830	Marriage Make-Over	Ally Blake	January 2005	
# 3831	The Monte Carlo Proposal	Lucy Gordon	February 2005	
# 3832	The Last Minute Marriage	Marion Lennox	February 2005	
# 3833	Her Desert Family	Barbara McMahon	February 2005	
# 3834	Hired By Mr. Right	Nicola Marsh	February 2005	
# 3835	To Marry For Duty	Rebecca Winters	March 2005	
# 3836	Assignment: Twins	Leigh Michaels	March 2005	
# 3837	A Wife On Paper	Liz Fielding	March 2005	
# 3838	For Our Children's Sake	Natasha Oakley	March 2005	
# 3839	Vacancy: Wife Of Convenience	Jessica Steele	April 2005	
# 3840	In The Shelter Of His Arms	Jackie Braun	April 2005	
# 3841	The Cattleman's English Rose	Barbara Hannay	April 2005	
# 3842	The Bridal Bet	Trish Wylie	April 2005	
# 3843	A Family For Keeps	Lucy Gordon	May 2005	
# 3844	Here Comes The Bride: The Billionaire's Blind Date	Jessica Hart	May 2005	
# 3844	Here Comes The Bride: The Bridesmaid's Proposal	Rebecca Winters	May 2005	
# 3845	The Blind Date Surprise	Barbara Hannay	May 2005	
# 3846	First Prize: Marriage	Jodi Dawson	May 2005	
# 3847	Their Pregnancy Bombshell	Barbara McMahon	June 2005	
# 3848	His Hired Bride	Susan Fox	June 2005	
# 3849	The Mirrabrook Marriage	Barbara Hannay	June 2005	
# 3850	The Fiancée Charade	Darcy Maguire	June 2005	
# 3851	Pregnant: Father Needed	Barbara McMahon	July 2005	
# 3852	Husband By Request	Rebecca Winters	July 2005	
# 3853	Her Wish-List Bridegroom	Liz Fielding	July 2005	
# 3854	The Business Arrangement	Natasha Oakley	July 2005	
# 3855	The Italian's Rightful Bride	Lucy Gordon	August 2005	
# 3856	Rescued By A Millionaire	Marion Lennox	August 2005	
# 3857	The Corporate Marriage Campaign	Leigh Michaels	August 2005	
# 3858	Parents Of Convenience	Jennie Adams	August 2005	
# 3859	The Outback Engagement	Margaret Way	September 2005	
# 3860	The Billionaire's Bride	Jackie Braun	September 2005	
# 3861	Contracted: Corporate Wife	Jessica Hart	September 2005	
# 3862	The Marriage Adventure	Hannah Bernard	September 2005	
# 3863	Marriage At Murraree	Margaret Way	October 2005	
# 3864	Winning Back His Wife	Barbara McMahon	October 2005	
# 3865	Just Friends To...Just Married	Renee Roszel	October 2005	
# 3866	Impossibly Pregnant	Nicola Marsh	October 2005	
# 3867	Their New-Found Family	Rebecca Winters	November 2005	
# 3868	Strictly Business: The Temp And The Tycoon	Liz Fielding	November 2005	
# 3868	Strictly Business: The Fiancé Deal	Hannah Bernard	November 2005	
# 3869	Mistletoe Marriage	Jessica Hart	November 2005	
# 3870	The Shock Engagement	Ally Blake	November 2005	
# 3871	A Most Suitable Wife	Jessica Steele	December 2005	
# 3872	A Nanny For Keeps	Liz Fielding	December 2005	
# 3873	Christmas Gift: A Family	Barbara Hannay	December 2005	
# 3874	Taking On The Boss	Darcy Maguire	December 2005	
