= List of Harlequin Romance novels released in 2001 =

This is a list of Harlequin Romance novels released in 2001. (Main index: List of Harlequin Romance novels)

== Releases ==
Number	Title	Author	Date	Citations
# 3635	His Very Own Baby	Rebecca Winters	January 2001	
# 3636	Love Can Wait	Betty Neels	January 2001	
# 3637	The Bridal Swap	Leigh Michaels	January 2001	
# 3638	Baby at Bushman's Creek	Jessica Hart	January 2001	
# 3639	The Baby Discovery	Rebecca Winters	February 2001	
# 3640	For The Sake Of His Child	Lucy Gordon	February 2001	
# 3641	Delivered: One Family	Caroline Anderson	February 2001	
# 3642	The Reluctant Tycoon	Emma Richmond	February 2001	
# 3643	The Bachelor's Bargain	Jessica Steele	March 2001	
# 3644	Accidental Fiancée	Renee Roszel	March 2001	
# 3645	His Runaway Bride	Liz Fielding	March 2001	
# 3646	Wedding At Waverley Creek	Jessica Hart	March 2001	
# 3647	An Ideal Wife	Betty Neels	April 2001	
# 3648	The Man She'll Marry	Susan Fox	April 2001	
# 3649	Temporary Father	Barbara McMahon	April 2001	
# 3650	A Child In Need	Marion Lennox	April 2001	
# 3651	The Marriage Project	Day Leclaire	May 2001	
# 3652	Her Ideal Husband	Liz Fielding	May 2001	
# 3653	The Wedding Secret	Janelle Denison	May 2001	
# 3654	A Bride For Barra Creek	Jessica Hart	May 2001	
# 3655	Wife by Arrangement	Lucy Gordon	June 2001	
# 3656	A Convenient Affair	Leigh Michaels	June 2001	
# 3657	The Husband Campaign	Barbara McMahon	June 2001	
# 3658	Twins Included!	Grace Green	June 2001	
# 3659	Husband By Necessity	Lucy Gordon	July 2001	
# 3660	To Catch A Bride	Renee Roszel	July 2001	
# 3661	Midnight Wedding	Sophie Weston	July 2001	
# 3662	Their Baby Bargain	Marion Lennox	July 2001	
# 3663	The Provocative Proposal	Day Leclaire	August 2001	
# 3664	Husbands Of The Outback: Genni's Dilemma	Margaret Way	August 2001	
# 3664	Husbands Of The Outback: Charlotte's Choice	Barbara Hannay	August 2001	
# 3665	Husband For A Year	Rebecca Winters	August 2001	
# 3666	The Bachelor's Baby	Liz Fielding	August 2001	
# 3667	A Suitable Husband	Jessica Steele	September 2001	
# 3668	The Wife He Chose	Susan Fox	September 2001	
# 3669	The Marriage Test	Barbara McMahon	September 2001	
# 3670	Outback With the Boss	Barbara Hannay	September 2001	
# 3671	Master Of Maramba	Margaret Way	October 2001	
# 3672	His Trophy Wife	Leigh Michaels	October 2001	
# 3673	Claiming His Baby	Rebecca Winters	October 2001	
# 3674	Marrying A Doctor	Caroline Anderson & Betty Neels	October 2001	
# 3675	Always And Forever	Betty Neels	November 2001	
# 3676	The Impetuous Bride	Caroline Anderson	November 2001	
# 3677	More Than A Millionaire	Sophie Weston	November 2001	
# 3678	The Wedding Deal	Janelle Denison	November 2001	
# 3679	Outback Fire	Margaret Way	December 2001	
# 3680	Part-Time Marriage	Jessica Steele	December 2001	
# 3681	The Stand-In Bride	Lucy Gordon	December 2001	
# 3682	Her Hired Husband	Renee Roszel	December 2001	
