= List of Harlequin Romance novels released in 1980 =

This is a list of Harlequin Romance novels released in 1980. (Main index: List of Harlequin Romance novels)

== Releases ==
Number	Title	Author	Date	Citations
# 2305	The Man on the Peak	Katrina Britt	January 1980	
# 2306	The Bending Reed	Elizabeth Dawson	January 1980	
# 2307	Dark Encounter	Susanna Firth	January 1980	
# 2308	Scorpio Summer	Jacqueline Gilbert	January 1980	
# 2309	Pride's Master	Jessica Steele	January 1980	
# 2310	The Ice Maiden	Sally Wentworth	January 1980	
# 2311	The Joyous Adventure	Elizabeth Ashton	February 1980	
# 2312	Return To Devil's View	Rosemary Carter	February 1980	
# 2313	The Spanish Uncle	Jane Corrie	February 1980	
# 2314	Midnight Sun's Magic	Betty Neels	February 1980	
# 2315	White Hibiscus	Rosemary Pollock	February 1980	
# 2316	With This Ring	Mary Wibberley	February 1980	
# 2317	The Vital Spark	Angela Carson	March 1980	
# 2318	The Angry Man	Joyce Dingwell	March 1980	
# 2319	Hepburn's Quay	Lucy Gillen	March 1980	
# 2320	Devil on Horseback	Elizabeth Graham	March 1980	
# 2321	Island Of Cyclones	Wynne May	March 1980	
# 2322	One More River to Cross	Essie Summers	March 1980	
# 2323	Across the Great Divide	Kerry Allyne	April 1980	
# 2324	Reluctant Partnership	Elizabeth Ashton	April 1980	
# 2325	A Man To Watch	Jane Donnelly	April 1980	
# 2326	Come Next Spring	Elizabeth Graham	April 1980	
# 2327	Stormy Affair	Margaret Mayo	April 1980	
# 2328	Blue Lotus	Margaret Way	April 1980	
# 2329	The Jasmine Bride	Daphne Clair	May 1980	
# 2330	Rough Justice	Janine Ellis	May 1980	
# 2331	A Certain Smile	Marjorie Lewty	May 1980	
# 2332	Champagne Spring	Margaret Rome	May 1980	
# 2333	The Master of Craighill	Rebecca Stratton	May 1980	
# 2334	Sweet Not Always	Karen Van Der Zee	May 1980	
# 2335	Tasmanian Tangle	Jane Corrie	June 1980	
# 2336	Return to Lanmore	Sheila Douglas	June 1980	
# 2337	Sea Lightning	Linda Harrel	June 1980	
# 2338	Winter Wedding	Betty Neels	June 1980	
# 2339	The Tears Of Venus	Rebecca Stratton	June 1980	
# 2340	A Dangerous Man	Mary Wibberley	June 1980	
# 2341	Sweet Harvest	Kerry Allyne	July 1980	
# 2342	The Devil Drives	Jane Arbor	July 1980	
# 2343	Flowers For My Love	Katrina Britt	July 1980	
# 2344	Prince Of Darkness	Susanna Firth	July 1980	
# 2345	Paradise Plantation	Henrietta Reid	July 1980	
# 2346	The Butterfly And The Baron	Margaret Way	July 1980	
# 2347	The Rekindled Flame	Elizabeth Ashton	August 1980	
# 2348	White Fire	Jan MacLean	August 1980	
# 2349	Man Of The High Country	Mary Moore	August 1980	
# 2350	Autumn Song	Margaret Pargeter	August 1980	
# 2351	Shadow Of An Eagle	Sue Peters	August 1980	
# 2352	Hostage of Dishonour	Jessica Steele	August 1980	
# 2353	Temple Of The Dawn	Anne Hampson	September 1980	
# 2354	Bellefleur	Sondra Stanford	September 1980	
# 2355	Turbulent Covenant	Jessica Steele	September 1980	
# 2356	Apollo's Daughter	Rebecca Stratton	September 1980	
# 2357	The Golden Puma	Margaret Way	September 1980	
# 2358	The Man From Amazibu Bay	Yvonne Whittal	September 1980	
# 2359	Nightingales	Mary Burchell	October 1980	
# 2360	Valley Of The Hawk	Margaret Mayo	October 1980	
# 2361	Garden Of Thorns	Sally Wentworth	October 1980	
# 2362	An Undefended City	Sophie Weston	October 1980	
# 2363	Forgotten Bride	Gwen Westwood	October 1980	
# 2364	Dangerous Marriage	Mary Wibberley	October 1980	
# 2365	The Station Boss	Jane Corrie	November 1980	
# 2366	Brief Enchantment	Jean S. MacLeod	November 1980	
# 2367	Last Fair	Betty Neels	November 1980	
# 2368	Claws Of A Wildcat	Sue Peters	November 1980	
# 2369	Marriage By Capture	Margaret Rome	November 1980	
# 2370	The Other Woman	Jessica Steele	November 1980	
# 2371	Island For Dreams	Katrina Britt	December 1980	
# 2372	Outback Runaway	Dorothy Cork	December 1980	
# 2373	No Way Out	Jane Donnelly	December 1980	
# 2374	Jacintha Point	Elizabeth Graham	December 1980	
# 2375	Kiss of a Tyrant	Margaret Pargeter	December 1980	
# 2376	Traders Cay	Rebecca Stratton	December 1980	
