= List of Harlequin Romance novels released in 1990 =

This is a list of Harlequin Romance novels released in 1990. (Main index: List of Harlequin Romance novels)

== Releases ==
Number	Title	Author	Date	Citations
# 3025	Arafura Pirate	Victoria Gordon	January 1990	
# 3026	Game Plan	Rosemary Hammond	January 1990	
# 3027	Spell Of The Mountains	Rosalie Henaghan	January 1990	
# 3028	Jinxed	Day Leclaire	January 1990	
# 3029	Conflict	Margaret Mayo	January 1990	
# 3030	Foolish Deceiver	Sandra K. Rhoades	January 1990	
# 3031	The Asking Price	Amanda Browning	February 1990	
# 3032	Red Hot Pepper	Roz Denny	February 1990	
# 3033	When We're Alone	Jane Donnelly	February 1990	
# 3034	Island Deception	Elizabeth Duke	February 1990	
# 3035	Queen Of Hearts	Melissa Forsythe	February 1990	
# 3036	No Need To Say Goodbye	Betty Neels	February 1990	
# 3037	Dark Memories	Kerry Allyne	March 1990	
# 3038	A Little Bit Country	Debbie Macomber	March 1990	
# 3039	Impulsive Proposal	Jeneth Murrey	March 1990	
# 3040	Rumor Has It	Celia Scott	March 1990	
# 3041	Farewell To Love	Jessica Steele	March 1990	
# 3042	The Maxton Bequest	Alison York	March 1990	
# 3043	Mountain Lovesong	Katherine Arthur	April 1990	
# 3044	Sweet Illusion	Angela Carson	April 1990	
# 3045	The Heart Of The Sun	Bethany Campbell	April 1990	
# 3046	That Certain Yearning	Claudia Jameson	April 1990	
# 3047	Fully Involved	Rebecca Winters	April 1990	
# 3048	A Song In The Wilderness	Lee Stafford	April 1990	
# 3049	Another Time, Another Love	Anne Beaumont	May 1990	
# 3050	Partners In Passion	Rosemary Carter	May 1990	
# 3051	Face Value	Rosemary Hammond	May 1990	
# 3052	Home For Love	Ellen James	May 1990	
# 3053	The Chain Of Destiny	Betty Neels	May 1990	
# 3054	Rash Contract	Angela Wells	May 1990	
# 3055	Intense Involvement	Jenny Arden	June 1990	
# 3056	Now And Forever	Elizabeth Barnes	June 1990	
# 3057	Home Safe	Kate Denton	June 1990	
# 3058	Impulsive Butterfly	Kay Gregory	June 1990	
# 3059	Country Bride	Debbie Macomber	June 1990	
# 3060	Man Of The House	Miriam MacGregor	June 1990	
# 3061	One More Secret	Katherine Arthur	July 1990	
# 3062	Dancing Sky	Bethany Campbell	July 1990	
# 3063	Passion's Far Shore	Madeleine Ker	July 1990	
# 3064	No Accounting For Love	Eva Rutland	July 1990	
# 3065	Frozen Enchantment	Jessica Steele	July 1990	
# 3066	Master Of Cashel	Sara Wood	July 1990	
# 3067	Another Man's Ring	Angela Carson	August 1990	
# 3068	Love's Ransom	Dana James	August 1990	
# 3069	The Turquoise Heart	Ellen James	August 1990	
# 3070	A Matter Of Principal	Leigh Michaels	August 1990	
# 3071	Hilltop Tryst	Betty Neels	August 1990	
# 3072	A Summer Kind Of Love	Shannon Waverly	August 1990	
# 3073	Bluebirds In The Spring	Jeanne Allan	September 1990	
# 3074	Trust Me, My Love	Sally Heywood	September 1990	
# 3075	Place For The Heart	Catherine Leigh	September 1990	
# 3076	Rainy Day Kisses	Debbie Macomber	September 1990	
# 3077	Passport To Happiness	Jessica Steele	September 1990	
# 3078	Jester's Girl	Kate Walker	September 1990	
# 3079	The Ends Of The Earth	Bethany Campbell	October 1990	
# 3080	Unlikely Places	Anne Marie Duquette	October 1990	
# 3081	Consolation Prize	Catherine George	October 1990	
# 3082	Amber And Amethyst	Kay Gregory	October 1990	
# 3083	Carville's Castle	Miriam MacGregor	October 1990	
# 3084	The Convenient Wife	Betty Neels	October 1990	
# 3085	Pattern Of Deceit	Emma Darcy	November 1990	
# 3086	An Imperfect Love	Leigh Michaels	November 1990	
# 3087	Give Me Your Answer Do	Celia Scott	November 1990	
# 3088	A Perfect Marriage	Lee Stafford	November 1990	
# 3089	Snow Demon	Nicola West	November 1990	
# 3090	The Story Princess	Rebecca Winters	November 1990	
# 3091	Deck the Halls	Heather Allison	December 1990	
# 3092	Silver Bells	Val Daniels	December 1990	
# 3093	Master Of Glen Crannach	Stephanie Howard	December 1990	
# 3094	Duel Of Passion	Madeleine Ker	December 1990	
# 3095	Unfriendly Proposition	Jessica Steele	December 1990	
# 3096	High Heaven	Quinn Wilder	December 1990	
