= List of Harlequin Romance novels released in 1949 =

This is a list of Harlequin Romance novels released in 1949. (Main index: List of Harlequin Romance novels)

== Releases ==
Number	Title	Author	Date released	Citation
# 1	The Manatee	Nancy Bruff	1949	
# 2	Lost House	Frances Shelley Wees	1949	
# 3	Maelstrom	Howard Hunt	1949	
# 4	Double Image	Arthur Herbert Bryant	1949	
# 5	Close To My Heart	Margaret Nichols	1949	
# 6	Wolf Of The Mesas	Charles H. Snow	1949	
# 7	The House On Craig Street	Ronald J. Cooke	1949	
# 8	Honeymoon Mountain	Frances Shelley Wees	1949	
# 9	The Dark Page	Samuel Michael Fuller	1949	
# 10	Here's Blood In Your Eye	Manning Long	1949	
# 11	The Wicked Lady Skelton	Magdalen King-Hall	1949	
# 12	A Killer Is Loose Among Us	Robert Terrall	1949	
# 13	His Wife The Doctor	Joseph Mccord	1949	
# 14	Six-Guns Of Sandoval	Charles H. Snow	1949	
# 15	Virgin With Butterflies	Tom Powers	1949	
# 16	No Nice Girl	Perry Lindsay	1949	
# 17	The D.A.'s Daughter	Herman Petersen	1949	
# 18	Rebel Of Ronde Valley	Charles H. Snow	1949	
# 19	Gina	George Albert Glay	1949	
# 20	Flame Vine	Helen Topping Miller	1949	
# 21	Renegade Ranger	Charles H. Snow	1949	
# 22	Crazy To Kill	Ann Cardwell	1949	
# 23	City For Conquest	Aben Kandel	1949	
# 24	Painted Post Outlaws	Tom Gunn	1949	
# 25	Blondes Don't Cry	Merlda Mace	1949	
# 26	Gambling On Love	Gail Jordon	1949	
