= List of Harlequin Romance novels released in 2006 =

This is a list of Harlequin Romance novels released in 2006. (Main index: List of Harlequin Romance novels)

== Releases ==
Number	Title	Author	Date	Citations
# 3875	Her Spanish Boss	Barbara McMahon	January 2006	
# 3876	In The Arms Of The Sheikh	Sophie Weston	January 2006	
# 3877	A Bride Worth Waiting For	Caroline Anderson	January 2006	
# 3878	A Family To Belong To	Natasha Oakley	January 2006	
# 3879	Wife and Mother Forever	Lucy Gordon	February 2006	
# 3880	Father By Choice	Rebecca Winters	February 2006	
# 3881	A Husband To Belong To	Susan Fox	February 2006	
# 3882	Marriage Lost and Found	Trish Wylie	February 2006	
# 3883	Her Italian Boss's Agenda	Lucy Gordon	March 2006	
# 3884	Princess of Convenience	Marion Lennox	March 2006	
# 3885	The Marriage Miracle	Liz Fielding	March 2006	
# 3886	Her Secret, His Son	Barbara Hannay	March 2006	
# 3887	The Wedding Arrangement	Lucy Gordon	April 2006	
# 3888	His Inherited Wife	Barbara McMahon	April 2006	
# 3889	Marriage Reunited	Jessica Hart	April 2006	
# 3890	A Father In The Making	Ally Blake	April 2006	
# 3891	The Cattle Baron's Bride	Margaret Way	May 2006	
# 3892	Meant-To-Be Marriage	Rebecca Winters	May 2006	
# 3893	The Five-Year Baby Secret	Liz Fielding	May 2006	
# 3894	Ordinary Girl, Society Groom	Natasha Oakley	May 2006	
# 3895	Her Outback Protector	Margaret Way	June 2006	
# 3896	The Doctor's Proposal	Marion Lennox	June 2006	
# 3897	A Woman Worth Loving	Jackie Braun	June 2006	
# 3898	Blue Moon Bride	Renee Roszel	June 2006	
# 3899	The Sheikh's Secret	Barbara McMahon	July 2006	
# 3900	The Heir's Chosen Bride	Marion Lennox	July 2006	
# 3901	Their Unfinished Business	Jackie Braun	July 2006	
# 3902	The Tycoon's Proposal	Leigh Michaels	July 2006	
# 3903	A Nine-To-Five Affair	Jessica Steele	August 2006	
# 3904	Having The Frenchman's Baby	Rebecca Winters	August 2006	
# 3905	Saying Yes To The Boss	Jackie Braun	August 2006	
# 3906	Wife And Mother Wanted	Nicola Marsh	August 2006	
# 3907	Claiming His Family	Barbara Hannay	September 2006	
# 3908	Contract To Marry	Nicola Marsh	September 2006	
# 3909	The Wedding Surprise	Trish Wylie	September 2006	
# 3910	At the Cattleman's Command	Lindsay Armstrong	September 2006	
# 3911	Married Under The Italian Sun	Lucy Gordon	September 2006	
# 3912	The Rebel Prince	Raye Morgan	September 2006	
# 3913	Accepting The Boss's Proposal	Natasha Oakley	September 2006	
# 3914	The Sheikh's Guarded Heart	Liz Fielding	September 2006	
# 3915	Promise Of A Family	Jessica Steele	October 2006	
# 3916	Wanted: Outback Wife	Ally Blake	October 2006	
# 3917	Business Arrangement Bride	Jessica Hart	October 2006	
# 3918	Long-Lost Father	Melissa James	October 2006	
# 3919	Her Christmas Wedding Wish	Judy Christenberry	November 2006	
# 3920	Married Under The Mistletoe	Linda Goodnight	November 2006	
# 3921	Snowbound Reunion	Barbara McMahon	November 2006	
# 3922	Project: Parenthood	Trish Wylie	November 2006	
# 3923	The Bride Of Montefalco	Rebecca Winters	December 2006	
# 3924	Crazy About The Boss	Teresa Southwick	December 2006	
# 3925	Claiming The Cattleman's Heart	Barbara Hannay	December 2006	
# 3926	Inherited: Baby	Nicola Marsh	December 2006	
