= List of Harlequin Romance novels released in 2011 =

This is a list of Harlequin Romance novels released in 2011. (Main index: List of Harlequin Romance novels)

== Releases ==
Number	Title	Author	Date	Citations
#4213	Crown Prince, Pregnant Bride!	Raye Morgan	January 2011	
#4214	Wealthy Australian, Secret Son	Margaret Way	January 2011	
#4215	Midnight Kiss, New Year Wish	Shirley Jump	January 2011	
#4216	The Soldier's Untamed Heart	Nikki Logan	January 2011	
#4217	His Diamond Bride	Lucy Gordon	January 2011	
#4218	Molly Cooper's Dream Date	Barbara Hannay	January 2011	
#4219	The Nanny And The CEO	Rebecca Winters	February 2011	
#4220	The Baby Swap Miracle	Caroline Anderson	February 2011	
#4221	Proud Rancher, Precious Bundle	Donna Alward	February 2011	
#4222	Daycare Mom To Wife	Jennie Adams	February 2011	
#4223	Expecting Royal Twins!	Melissa McClone	February 2011	
#4224	Millionaire's Baby Bombshell	Fiona Harper	February 2011	
#4225	Becoming The Tycoon's Bride: Chosen as The Sheikh's Wife	Liz Fielding	March 2011	
#4225	Becoming The Tycoon's Bride: The Tycoon's Marriage Bid	Patricia Thayer	March 2011	
#4226	To Dance With A Prince	Cara Colter	March 2011	
#4227	Angel Of Smoky Hollow	Barbara McMahon	March 2011	
#4228	The Daddy Diaries	Jackie Braun	March 2011	
#4229	Beauty And The Brooding Boss	Barbara Wallace	March 2011	
#4230	The Last Summer Of Being Single	Nina Harrington	March 2011	
#4231	The Baby Project	Susan Meier	April 2011	
#4232	In The Australian Billionaire's Arms	Margaret Way	April 2011	
#4233	How To Lasso A Cowboy	Shirley Jump	April 2011	
#4234	Riches To Rags Bride	Myrna MacKenzie	April 2011	
#4235	Rancher's Twins: Mom Needed	Barbara Hannay	April 2011	
#4236	Friends To Forever	Nikki Logan	April 2011	
#4237	Second Chance Baby	Susan Meier	May 2011	
#4238	The Boss's Surprise Son	Teresa Carpenter	May 2011	
#4239	Her Desert Prince	Rebecca Winters	May 2011	
#4240	Honeymoon With The Rancher	Donna Alward	May 2011	
#4241	Abby And The Bachelor Cop	Marion Lennox	May 2011	
#4242	What's A Housekeeper To Do?	Jennie Adams	May 2011	
#4243	Baby On The Ranch	Susan Meier	June 2011	
#4244	And Baby Makes Three: Playboy's Surprise Son	Lucy Gordon	June 2011	
#4244	And Baby Makes Three: Adopted Baby, Convenient Wife	Rebecca Winters	June 2011	
#4245	Ordinary Girl In A Tiara	Jessica Hart	June 2011	
#4246	Tempted By Trouble	Liz Fielding	June 2011	
#4247	Misty And The Single Dad	Marion Lennox	June 2011	
#4248	Her Moment In The Spotlight	Nina Harrington	June 2011	
#4249	Her Outback Commander	Margaret Way	July 2011	
#4250	Not-So-Perfect Princess	Melissa McClone	July 2011	
#4251	A Family For The Rugged Rancher	Donna Alward	July 2011	
#4252	Girl In A Vintage Dress	Nicola Marsh	July 2011	
#4253	From Daredevil To Devoted Daddy	Barbara McMahon	July 2011	
#4254	Soldier On Her Doorstep	Soraya Lane	July 2011	
#4255	Little Cowgirl Needs A Mom	Patricia Thayer	August 2011	
#4256	To Wed A Rancher	Myrna MacKenzie	August 2011	
#4257	The Secret Princess	Jessica Hart	August 2011	
#4258	Mr. Right There All Along	Jackie Braun	August 2011	
#4259	A Kiss To Seal The Deal	Nikki Logan	August 2011	
#4260	The Army Ranger's Return	Soraya Lane	August 2011	
#4261	The Lonesome Rancher	Patricia Thayer	September 2011	
#4262	Royal Wedding Bells: The Ordinary King	Nina Harrington	September 2011	
#4262	Royal Wedding Bells: The Prince's Forbidden	Raye Morgan	September 2011	
#4263	The Princess Test	Shirley Jump	September 2011	
#4264	Rescued By The Brooding Tycoon	Lucy Gordon	September 2011	
#4265	Swept Off Her Stilettos	Fiona Harper	September 2011	
#4266	The Heart Of A Hero	Barbara Wallace	September 2011	
#4267	Tall, Dark, Texas Ranger	Patricia Thayer	October 2011	
#4268	Australia's Maverick Millionaire	Margaret Way	October 2011	
#4269	Bridesmaid Says, "I Do!"	Barbara Hannay	October 2011	
#4270	How A Cowboy Stole Her Heart	Donna Alward	October 2011	
#4271	Her Italian Soldier	Rebecca Winters	October 2011	
#4272	Surprise: Outback Proposal	Jennie Adams	October 2011	
#4273	Snowbound With Her Hero	Rebecca Winters	November 2011	
#4274	The Playboy's Gift	Teresa Carpenter	November 2011	
#4275	Firefighter Under The Mistletoe	Melissa McClone	November 2011	
#4276	Blind Date Rivals	Nina Harrington	November 2011	
#4277	The Princess Next Door	Jackie Braun	November 2011	
#4278	Rodeo Daddy	Soraya Lane	November 2011	
#4279	Kisses On Her Christmas List	Susan Meier	December 2011	
#4280	Runaway Bride	Barbara Hannay	December 2011	
#4281	Family Christmas In Riverbend	Shirley Jump	December 2011	
#4282	Flirting With Italian	Liz Fielding	December 2011	
#4283	Nikki And The Lone Wolf	Marion Lennox	December 2011	
#4284	The Secretary's Secret	Michelle Douglas	December 2011	
