= List of Harlequin Romance novels released in 1974 =

This is a list of Harlequin Romance novels released in 1974. (Main index: List of Harlequin Romance novels)

== Releases ==
Number	Title	Author	Date	Citations
# 1745	Nurse At Noongwalla	Roumelia Lane	January 1974	
# 1746	Without Any Amazement	Margaret Malcolm	January 1974	
# 1747	The Fields Of Heaven	Anne Weale	January 1974	
# 1748	The Golden Madonna	Rebecca Stratton	January 1974	
# 1749	Lovely Is The Rose	Belinda Dell	January 1974	
# 1750	The House of Scissors	Isobel Chace	January 1974	
# 1751	Carnival Coast	Charlotte Lamb	January 1974	
# 1752	Miranda's Marriage	Margery Hilton	January 1974	
# 1753	Time Change	Nan Asquith	February 1974	
# 1754	The Pretty Witch	Lucy Gillen	February 1974	
# 1755	School My Heart	Penelope Walsh	February 1974	
# 1756	An Apple In Eden	Kay Thorpe	February 1974	
# 1757	The Girl At Saltbush Flat	Dorothy Cork	February 1974	
# 1758	The Crescent Moon	Elizabeth Hunter	February 1974	
# 1759	The Rest Is Magic	Marjorie Lewty	February 1974	
# 1760	The Guarded Gates	Katrina Britt	February 1974	
# 1761	Stars Through the Mist	Betty Neels	March 1974	
# 1762	Sigh No More	Elizabeth Ashton	March 1974	
# 1763	Cage Of Gold	Rachel Lindsay	March 1974	
# 1764	Bird Of Prey	Henrietta Reid	March 1974	
# 1765	The Splendid Legacy	Eleanor Farnes	March 1974	
# 1766	Storm Over Mandargi	Margaret Way	March 1974	
# 1767	Unbidden Melody	Mary Burchell	March 1974	
# 1768	The Palace Of Gold	Hilary Wilde	March 1974	
# 1769	The Girl In The Green Valley	Elizabeth Hoy	April 1974	
# 1770	Fairwinds	Rebecca Stratton	April 1974	
# 1771	The Silver Stallion	Iris Danbury	April 1974	
# 1772	Sister Pussycat	Joyce Dingwell	April 1974	
# 1773	A Man Of Kent	Isobel Chace	April 1974	
# 1774	The Legend Of The Swans	Flora Kidd	April 1974	
# 1775	Master Of Saramanca	Mary Wibberley	April 1974	
# 1776	The Island Of Pearls	Margaret Rome	April 1974	
# 1777	Enchanting Samantha	Betty Neels	May 1974	
# 1778	A Sense Of Belonging	Lilian Peake	May 1974	
# 1779	The Man At Kambala	Kay Thorpe	May 1974	
# 1780	The Tower Of The Winds	Elizabeth Hunter	May 1974	
# 1781	Cherish This Wayward Heart	Margaret Malcolm	May 1974	
# 1782	Painted Wings	Lucy Gillen	May 1974	
# 1783	Cinderella In Mink	Roberta Leigh	May 1974	
# 1784	The Red Plains of Jounima	Dorothy Cork	May 1974	
# 1785	The Love Theme	Margaret Way	June 1974	
# 1786	Sweeter Than Honey	Hilary Wilde	June 1974	
# 1787	The Runaway Visitors	Eleanor Farnes	June 1974	
# 1788	Errant Bride	Elizabeth Ashton	June 1974	
# 1789	The Velvet Spur	Jane Arbor	June 1974	
# 1790	Laird Of Gaela	Mary Wibberley	June 1974	
# 1791	The Trees Of Tarrentall	Linden Grierson	June 1974	
# 1792	Pay Me Tomorrow	Mary Burchell	June 1974	
# 1793	The King Of Spades	Katrina Britt	July 1974	
# 1794	Pink Sands	Wynne May	July 1974	
# 1795	The Edge Of Beyond	Isobel Chace	July 1974	
# 1796	Gallant's Fancy	Flora Kidd	July 1974	
# 1797	The Darling Pirate	Belinda Dell	July 1974	
# 1798	Nile Dusk	Pamela Kent	July 1974	
# 1799	The Bride Of Romano	Rebecca Stratton	July 1974	
# 1800	Shade Of The Palms	Roberta Leigh	July 1974	
# 1801	Uncertain Summer	Betty Neels	August 1974	
# 1802	The Benedict Man	Mary Wibberley	August 1974	
# 1803	A Family Affair	Charlotte Lamb	August 1974	
# 1804	The Fires Of Torretta	Iris Danbury	August 1974	
# 1805	Return To Blytheburn	Margaret Malcolm	August 1974	
# 1806	The Pengelly Jade	Lucy Gillen	August 1974	
# 1807	The Tree Of Idleness	Elizabeth Hunter	August 1974	
# 1808	There Were Three Princes	Joyce Dingwell	August 1974	
# 1809	Connelly's Castle	Gloria Bevan	September 1974	
# 1810	The Rocks Of Arachenza	Elizabeth Ashton	September 1974	
# 1811	Strangers Marry	Mary Burchell	September 1974	
# 1812	A Promise To Keep	Dorothy Cork	September 1974	
# 1813	Destiny Decrees	Margaret Mann	September 1974	
# 1814	A Time To Love	Ruth Clemence	September 1974	
# 1815	Wind River	Margaret Way	September 1974	
# 1816	Castles In Spain	Rebecca Stratton	September 1974	
# 1817	The Gemel Ring	Betty Neels	October 1974	
# 1818	One Hot Summer	Norrey Ford	October 1974	
# 1819	All Made Of Wishes	Marjorie Lewty	October 1974	
# 1820	Rising River	Linden Grierson	October 1974	
# 1821	When Winter Has Gone	Hilda Pressley	October 1974	
# 1822	The Runaway Bride	Lucy Gillen	October 1974	
# 1823	Across the Lagoon	Roumelia Lane	October 1974	
# 1824	A Handful Of Dreams	Hilary Wilde	October 1974	
# 1825	Shadows On The Sand	Elizabeth Hoy	November 1974	
# 1826	The Habit Of Love	Joyce Dingwell	November 1974	
# 1827	Logan's Island	Mary Wibberley	November 1974	
# 1828	A Bright Particular Star	Margaret Malcolm	November 1974	
# 1829	The Dragon's Cave	Isobel Chace	November 1974	
# 1830	Falcon On The Mountain	Gwyn Lavender	November 1974	
# 1831	Master Of The House	Lilian Peake	November 1974	
# 1832	Meet the Sun Halfway	Jane Arbor	November 1974	
# 1833	The Paper Marriage	Flora Kidd	December 1974	
# 1834	Song Cycle	Mary Burchell	December 1974	
# 1835	Dark Angel	Elizabeth Ashton	December 1974	
# 1836	Kyle's Kingdom	Mary Wibberley	December 1974	
# 1837	The Amethyst Meadows	Iris Danbury	December 1974	
# 1838	Master Of Koros	Jan Andersen	December 1974	
# 1839	Run From The Wind	Rebecca Stratton	December 1974	
# 1840	Return To Belle Amber	Margaret Way	December 1974	
