= List of Harlequin Romance novels released in 1992 =

This is a list of Harlequin Romance novels released in 1992. (Main index: List of Harlequin Romance novels)

== Releases ==
Number	Title	Author	Date	Citations
# 3169	The Cinderella Coach	Roz Denny	January 1992	
# 3170	Windswept	Rosalie Henaghan	January 1992	
# 3171	Garrett's Back In Town	Leigh Michaels	January 1992	
# 3172	Checkmate	Peggy Nicholson	January 1992	
# 3173	Without Knowing Why	Jessica Steele	January 1992	
# 3174	Give And Take	Kate Walker	January 1992	
# 3175	Rancher's Bride	Jeanne Allan	February 1992	
# 3176	Love For Hire	Jasmine Cresswell	February 1992	
# 3177	Unlikely Cupid	Catherine George	February 1992	
# 3178	Magic Carpets	Lucy Keane	February 1992	
# 3179	Cats In The Belfry	Patricia Knoll	February 1992	
# 3180	My Hero	Debbie Macomber	February 1992	
# 3181	Keep My Heart Forever	Katherine Arthur	March 1992	
# 3182	Ariana's Magic	Judy Kaye	March 1992	
# 3183	In The Market	Day Leclaire	March 1992	
# 3184	Old School Ties	Leigh Michaels	March 1992	
# 3185	The Most Marvellous Summer	Betty Neels	March 1992	
# 3186	Gypsy In The Night	Sophie Weston	March 1992	
# 3187	Spellbinder	Bethany Campbell	April 1992	
# 3188	Doubly Delicious	Emma Goldrick	April 1992	
# 3189	A Love That Endures	Claudia Jameson	April 1992	
# 3190	An Impossible Situation	Margaret Mayo	April 1992	
# 3191	Outlaw Heart	Quinn Wilder	April 1992	
# 3192	The Marriage Bracelet	Rebecca Winters	April 1992	
# 3193	The Wrong Kind Of Man	Rosemary Hammond	May 1992	
# 3194	For Love Or Power	Rosalie Henaghan	May 1992	
# 3195	Romantic Journey	Stephanie Howard	May 1992	
# 3196	The Man You'll Marry	Debbie Macomber	May 1992	
# 3197	The Final Touch	Betty Neels	May 1992	
# 3198	Prince Of Delights	Renee Roszel	May 1992	
# 3199	A Cinderella Affair	Anne Beaumont	June 1992	
# 3200	Wild Temptation	Elizabeth Duke	June 1992	
# 3201	Brazilian Enchantment	Catherine George	June 1992	
# 3202	Love Your Enemy	Ellen James	June 1992	
# 3203	Runaway From Love	Jessica Steele	June 1992	
# 3204	New Lease On Love	Shannon Waverly	June 1992	
# 3205	Jean Fireworks!	Ruth Dale	July 1992	
# 3206	Breaking The Ice	Kay Gregory	July 1992	
# 3207	Man Of Truth	Jessica Marchant	July 1992	
# 3208	A Kind of Magic	Betty Neels	July 1992	
# 3209	Far From Over	Valerie Parv	July 1992	
# 3210	Both Of Them	Rebecca Winters	July 1992	
# 3211	Sand Dollar	Bethany Campbell	August 1992	
# 3212	Arrangement With a Rebel	Anne Marie Duquette	August 1992	
# 3213	The Trouble With Love	Jessica Hart	August 1992	
# 3214	The Best-Made Plans	Leigh Michaels	August 1992	
# 3215	His Woman	Jessica Steele	August 1992	
# 3216	Pink Champagne	Anne Weale	August 1992	
# 3217	From The Highest Mountain	Jeanne Allan	September 1992	
# 3218	Jack Of Hearts	Heather Allison	September 1992	
# 3219	A Neighborly Affair	Amanda Clark	September 1992	
# 3220	A Matter Of Honour	Stephanie Howard	September 1992	
# 3221	Island Paradise	Barbara McMahon	September 1992	
# 3222	An Unlikely Romance	Betty Neels	September 1992	
# 3223	To Love And Protect	Kate Denton	October 1992	
# 3224	Anything For You	Rosemary Hammond	October 1992	
# 3225	The Intruder	Miriam MacGregor	October 1992	
# 3226	Weekend Wife	Sue Peters	October 1992	
# 3227	Bad Neighbours	Jessica Steele	October 1992	
# 3228	Meant For Each Other	Rebecca Winters	October 1992	
# 3229	Signs Of Love	Katherine Arthur	November 1992	
# 3230	Only Make-Believe	Bethany Campbell	November 1992	
# 3231	Woman At Willagong Creek	Jessica Hart	November 1992	
# 3232	Valerie	Debbie Macomber	November 1992	
# 3233	The Unexpected Landlord	Leigh Michaels	November 1992	
# 3234	Summer's Echo	Lee Stafford	November 1992	
# 3235	Cause For Love	Kerry Allyne	December 1992	
# 3236	Leader Of The Pack	Catherine George	December 1992	
# 3237	Dangerous Infatuation	Stephanie Howard	December 1992	
# 3238	A Wholesale Arrangement	Day Leclaire	December 1992	
# 3239	Stephanie	Debbie Macomber	December 1992	
# 3240	Always Christmas	Eva Rutland	December 1992	
