= List of Harlequin Romance novels released in 2004 =

This is a list of Harlequin Romance novels released in 2004. (Main index: List of Harlequin Romance novels)

== Releases ==
Number	Title	Author	Date	Citations
# 3779	The Frenchman's Bride	Rebecca Winters	January 2004	
# 3780	The Italian's Baby	Lucy Gordon	January 2004	
# 3781	His Potential Wife	Grace Green	January 2004	
# 3782	The Wedding Wish	Ally Blake	January 2004	
# 3783	Part-Time Fiancé	Leigh Michaels	February 2004	
# 3784	Her Royal Baby	Marion Lennox	February 2004	
# 3785	The Boss's Convenient Proposal	Barbara McMahon	February 2004	
# 3786	A Bride At Birralee	Barbara Hannay	February 2004	
# 3787	Her Boss's Marriage Agenda	Jessica Steele	March 2004	
# 3788	Bride Of Convenience	Susan Fox	March 2004	
# 3789	A Spanish Honeymoon	Anne Weale	March 2004	
# 3790	Assignment: Marriage	Jodi Dawson	March 2004	
# 3791	The Duke's Proposal	Sophie Weston	April 2004	
# 3792	Mission: Marriage	Hannah Bernard	April 2004	
# 3793	The Man From Madrid	Anne Weale	April 2004	
# 3794	A Wedding At Windaroo	Barbara Hannay	April 2004	
# 3795	Rafael's Convenient Proposal	Rebecca Winters	May 2004	
# 3796	A Marriage Worth Waiting For	Susan Fox	May 2004	
# 3797	Her Boss's Baby Plan	Jessica Hart	May 2004	
# 3798	A Family Of His Own	Liz Fielding	May 2004	
# 3799	Rinaldo's Inherited Bride	Lucy Gordon	June 2004	
# 3800	The Takeover Bid	Leigh Michaels	June 2004	
# 3801	A Professional Engagement	Darcy Maguire	June 2004	
# 3802	Marriage Material	Ally Blake	June 2004	
# 3803	Innocent Mistress	Margaret Way	July 2004	
# 3804	Her Stand-In Groom	Jackie Braun	July 2004	
# 3805	The Best Man's Baby	Darcy Maguire	July 2004	
# 3806	The Pregnant Tycoon	Caroline Anderson	July 2004	
# 3807	Gino's Arranged Bride	Lucy Gordon	August 2004	
# 3808	The Baby Proposal	Rebecca Winters	August 2004	
# 3809	A Convenient Groom	Darcy Maguire	August 2004	
# 3810	The Tycoon's Dating Deal	Nicola Marsh	August 2004	
# 3811	His Heiress Wife	Margaret Way	September 2004	
# 3812	The Englishman's Bride	Sophie Weston	September 2004	
# 3813	Marriage In Name Only	Barbara McMahon	September 2004	
# 3814	The Honeymoon Proposal	Hannah Bernard	September 2004	
# 3815	The Husband Sweepstake	Leigh Michaels	October 2004	
# 3816	His Pretend Wife	Lucy Gordon	October 2004	
# 3817	The Billionaire Takes A Bride	Liz Fielding	October 2004	
# 3818	The Wedding Contract	Nicola Marsh	October 2004	
# 3819	To Catch A Groom	Rebecca Winters	November 2004	
# 3820	Christmas Eve Marriage	Jessica Hart	November 2004	
# 3821	A Surprise Christmas Proposal	Liz Fielding	November 2004	
# 3822	His Convenient Fiancée	Barbara McMahon	November 2004	
# 3823	The Australian Tycoon's Proposal	Margaret Way	December 2004	
# 3824	A Pretend Engagement	Jessica Steele	December 2004	
# 3825	The Game Show Bride	Jackie Braun	December 2004	
# 3826	The Pregnancy Surprise	Caroline Anderson	December 2004	
