= List of Harlequin Romance novels released in 1973 =

This is a list of Harlequin Romance novels released in 1973. (Main index: List of Harlequin Romance novels)

== Releases ==
| Number | Title | Author | Date | Citations |
|---|---|---|---|---|
| # 1649 | Sweet Kate | Lucy Gillen | January 1973 | |
| # 1650 | The Real Thing | Lilian Peake | January 1973 | |
| # 1651 | A Scent Of Lemons | Jill Christian | January 1973 | |
| # 1652 | A Pearl For Love | Mary Cummins | January 1973 | |
| # 1653 | The Tartan Touch | Isobel Chace | January 1973 | |
| # 1654 | In The Shade Of The Palms | Roumelia Lane | January 1973 | |
| # 1655 | It's Rumoured in the Village | Mary Burchell | January 1973 | |
| # 1656 | Autumn Of The Witch | Anne Mather | January 1973 | |
| # 1657 | Wife To Sim | Joyce Dingwell | February 1973 | |
| # 1658 | Dear Puritan | Violet Winspear | February 1973 | |
| # 1659 | A Parade Of Peacocks | Elizabeth Ashton | February 1973 | |
| # 1660 | A Stranger Came | Jane Donnelly | February 1973 | |
| # 1661 | Olive Island | Kay Thorpe | February 1973 | |
| # 1662 | A Serpent In Eden | Eleanor Farnes | February 1973 | |
| # 1663 | The Cave Of The White Rose | Flora Kidd | February 1973 | |
| # 1664 | The Faithful Rebel | Margaret Malcolm | February 1973 | |
| # 1665 | The Flower On The Rock | Jane Arbor | March 1973 | |
| # 1666 | Saturday's Child | Betty Neels | March 1973 | |
| # 1667 | A Question Of Marriage | Rachel Lindsay | March 1973 | |
| # 1668 | Summer Mountain | Dorothy Cork | March 1973 | |
| # 1669 | A Time Remembered | Lucy Gillen | March 1973 | |
| # 1670 | Frail Sanctuary | Margery Hilton | March 1973 | |
| # 1671 | Mandolins Of Montori | Iris Danbury | March 1973 | |
| # 1672 | The Rebel Bride | Anne Hampson | March 1973 | |
| # 1673 | A Pride Of Lions | Isobel Chace | April 1973 | |
| # 1674 | Man Out Of Reach | Lilian Peake | April 1973 | |
| # 1675 | Song Above The Clouds | Rosemary Pollock | April 1973 | |
| # 1676 | The Girl At Eagles' Mount | Margaret Rome | April 1973 | |
| # 1677 | Stranger At The Door | May Coates | April 1973 | |
| # 1678 | The Plantation Boss | Anne Hampson | April 1973 | |
| # 1679 | The Gentle Flame | Katrina Britt | April 1973 | |
| # 1680 | Rapture Of The Desert | Violet Winspear | April 1973 | |
| # 1681 | The Long Shadow | Jane Donnelly | May 1973 | |
| # 1682 | The Frost And The Fire | Gloria Bevan | May 1973 | |
| # 1683 | Dangerous Stranger | Lucy Gillen | May 1973 | |
| # 1684 | The Taming Of Lisa | Flora Kidd | May 1973 | |
| # 1685 | The Impossible Dream | Hilary Wilde | May 1973 | |
| # 1686 | Alpenrose | Madeline Charlton | May 1973 | |
| # 1687 | Noonfire | Margaret Way | May 1973 | |
| # 1688 | The Pool Of Pink Lilies | Joyce Dingwell | May 1973 | |
| # 1689 | Cassandra By Chance | Betty Neels | June 1973 | |
| # 1690 | The One And Only | Doris E. Smith | June 1973 | |
| # 1691 | A Bowl Of Stars | Wynne May | June 1973 | |
| # 1692 | Butterfly Montane | Dorothy Cork | June 1973 | |
| # 1693 | Adam's Daughter | Jean S. MacLeod | June 1973 | |
| # 1694 | The Tideless Sea | Juliet Armstrong | June 1973 | |
| # 1695 | That Island Summer | Elizabeth Hoy | June 1973 | |
| # 1696 | My Heart's A Dancer | Roberta Leigh | June 1973 | |
| # 1697 | Healing In The Hills | Ruth Clemence | July 1973 | |
| # 1698 | Cadence Of Portugal | Isobel Chace | July 1973 | |
| # 1699 | Sunshine On The Mountains | Margaret Malcolm | July 1973 | |
| # 1700 | Gone Before Morning | Lilian Peake | July 1973 | |
| # 1701 | Bird Of Paradis | Margaret Rome | July 1973 | |
| # 1702 | A Touch Of Magic / Lodestar In The South | Essie Summers | July 1973 | |
| # 1703 | Reluctant Voyager | Katrina Britt | July 1973 | |
| # 1704 | Except My Love | Mary Burchell | July 1973 | |
| # 1705 | Three For A Wedding | Betty Neels | August 1973 | |
| # 1706 | Shadow Of The Past | Monica Douglas | August 1973 | |
| # 1707 | Garden Of The Sun | Janice Gray | August 1973 | |
| # 1708 | Golden Harvest | Stella Frances Nel | August 1973 | |
| # 1709 | The Man From Coral Bay | Jan Andersen | August 1973 | |
| # 1710 | The Inshine Girl | Margery Hilton | August 1973 | |
| # 1711 | Summer Season | Lucy Gillen | August 1973 | |
| # 1712 | Matai Valley Magic | Mary Moore | August 1973 | |
| # 1713 | Alpine Rhapsody | Elizabeth Ashton | September 1973 | |
| # 1714 | Spirit Of The Sun | Dorothy Cork | September 1973 | |
| # 1715 | In Name Only | Roberta Leigh | September 1973 | |
| # 1716 | Citadel Of Swallows | Gwen Westwood | September 1973 | |
| # 1717 | Black Niall | Mary Wibberley | September 1973 | |
| # 1718 | Lord Of The Forest | Hilda Nickson | September 1973 | |
| # 1719 | The Rainbow Days | Jean S. MacLeod | September 1973 | |
| # 1720 | Intruder At Windgates | Henrietta Reid | September 1973 | |
| # 1721 | The Flamboyant Tree | Isobel Chace | October 1973 | |
| # 1722 | Follow A Stranger | Charlotte Lamb | October 1973 | |
| # 1723 | Rocks Under Shining Water | Jane Donnelly | October 1973 | |
| # 1724 | Wedding At Blue River | Dorothy Quentin | October 1973 | |
| # 1725 | The Extraordinary Engagement | Marjorie Lewty | October 1973 | |
| # 1726 | Man In Charge | Lilian Peake | October 1973 | |
| # 1727 | Strange Bewilderment | Katrina Britt | October 1973 | |
| # 1728 | The Lonely Road | Margaret Malcolm | October 1973 | |
| # 1729 | The Young Doctor | Sheila Douglas | November 1973 | |
| # 1730 | Flame In Fiji | Gloria Bevan | November 1973 | |
| # 1731 | The Forbidden Valley | Essie Summers | November 1973 | |
| # 1732 | Beyond The Sunset | Flora Kidd | November 1973 | |
| # 1733 | Call And I'll Come | Mary Burchell | November 1973 | |
| # 1734 | The Girl From Rome | Nan Asquith | November 1973 | |
| # 1735 | Temptations Of The Moon | Hilary Wilde | November 1973 | |
| # 1736 | The Enchanted Ring | Lucy Gillen | November 1973 | |
| # 1737 | Winter Of Change | Betty Neels | December 1973 | |
| # 1738 | The Mutual Look | Joyce Dingwell | December 1973 | |
| # 1739 | Beloved Enemy | Mary Wibberley | December 1973 | |
| # 1740 | Roman Summer | Jane Arbor | December 1973 | |
| # 1741 | Moorland Magic | Elizabeth Ashton | December 1973 | |
| # 1742 | Alien Corn | Rachel Lindsay | December 1973 | |
| # 1743 | Destiny Is A Flower | Stella Frances Nel | December 1973 | |
| # 1744 | Winter Loving | Janice Gray | December 1973 | |
