= List of Harlequin Romance novels released in 1999 =

This is a list of Harlequin Romance novels released in 1999. (Main index: List of Harlequin Romance novels)

== Releases ==
Number	Title	Author	Date	Citations
# 3535	Hand Picked Husband	Heather MacAllister	January 1999	
# 3536	Agenda: Attraction!	Jessica Steele	January 1999	
# 3537	Only By Chance	Betty Neels	January 1999	
# 3538	Make-Believe Mother	Pamela Bauer and Judy Kaye	January 1999	
# 3539	Bachelor Available!	Ruth Jean Dale	February 1999	
# 3540	Boardroom Proposal	Margaret Way	February 1999	
# 3541	Her Husband-To-Be	Leigh Michaels	February 1999	
# 3542	Branningan's Baby	Grace Green	February 1999	
# 3543	The Nine-Dollar Daddy	Day Leclaire	March 1999	
# 3544	Temporary Engagement	Jessica Hart	March 1999	
# 3545	Undercover Fiancée	Rebecca Winters	March 1999	
# 3546	A Dad For Daniel	Janelle Denison	March 1999	
# 3547	Daddy And Daughters	Barbara McMahon	April 1999	
# 3548	Beauty And The Boss	Lucy Gordon	April 1999	
# 3549	Undercover Bachelor	Rebecca Winters	April 1999	
# 3550	Her Own Prince Charming	Eva Rutland	April 1999	
# 3551	Mail-Order Marriage	Margaret Way	May 1999	
# 3552	The Boss And The Baby	Leigh Michaels	May 1999	
# 3553	Undercover Baby	Rebecca Winters	May 1999	
# 3554	Love And Marriage: Something Blue	Emma Goldrick	May 1999	
# 3554	Love And Marriage: Making Sure Of Sarah	Betty Neels	May 1999	
# 3555	The Boss And The Plain Jayne Bride	Heather MacAllister	June 1999	
# 3556	To Claim A Wife	Susan Fox	June 1999	
# 3557	Parents Wanted	Ruth Jean Dale	June 1999	
# 3558	Falling For Jack	Trisha David	June 1999	
# 3559	The One-Week Marriage	Renee Roszel	July 1999	
# 3560	To Tame A Bride	Susan Fox	July 1999	
# 3561	Farelli's Wife	Lucy Gordon	July 1999	
# 3562	Bachelor Cowboy	Patricia Knoll	July 1999	
# 3563	Making Mr. Right	Val Daniels	August 1999	
# 3564	Shotgun Bridegroom	Day Leclaire	August 1999	
# 3565	Bride Included	Janelle Denison	August 1999	
# 3566	The Daddy Dilemma	Kate Denton	August 1999	
# 3567	Trial Engagement	Barbara McMahon	September 1999	
# 3568	One Bride Delivered	Jeanne Allan	September 1999	
# 3569	A Wedding Worth Waiting For	Jessica Steele	September 1999	
# 3570	And Mother Makes Three	Liz Fielding	September 1999	
# 3571	Claiming His Child	Margaret Way	October 1999	
# 3572	Desert Honeymoon	Anne Weale	October 1999	
# 3573	Marrying Mr. Right	Carolyn Greene	October 1999	
# 3574	The Tycoon's Baby	Leigh Michaels	October 1999	
# 3575	Bridegroom On Approval	Day Leclaire	November 1999	
# 3576	One Mother Wanted	Jeanne Allan	November 1999	
# 3577	An Innocent Bride	Betty Neels	November 1999	
# 3578	Outback Wife And Mother	Barbara Hannay	November 1999	
# 3579	Long Lost Bride	Day Leclaire	December 1999	
# 3580	A Husband For Christmas	Emma Richmond	December 1999	
# 3581	Kissing Santa	Jessica Hart	December 1999	
# 3582	Resolution: Marriage	Patricia Knoll	December 1999	
