= List of Harlequin Romance novels released in 1978 =

This is a list of Harlequin Romance novels released in 1978. (Main index: List of Harlequin Romance novels)

== Releases ==
Number	Title	Author	Date	Citations
# 2129	Wife To Charles	Sophie Weston	January 1978	
# 2130	Isle of Desire	Anne Hampson	January 1978	
# 2131	The Sign Of The Ram	Rebecca Stratton	January 1978	
# 2132	Black Ingo	Margaret Way	January 1978	
# 2133	Adair Of Starlight Peaks	Essie Summers	January 1978	
# 2134	Heron's Point	Lucy Gillen	January 1978	
# 2135	The House Of Strange Music	Margery Hilton	January 1978	
# 2136	Daughter Of The Sun	Mary Wibberley	January 1978	
# 2137	Pineapple Girl	Betty Neels	February 1978	
# 2138	Sweet Is The Web	Anne Hampson	February 1978	
# 2139	Outback Rainbow	Dorothy Cork	February 1978	
# 2140	Flamingo Moon	Margaret Pargeter	February 1978	
# 2141	The Velvet Glove	Rebecca Stratton	February 1978	
# 2142	Island Stranger	Jean S. MacLeod	February 1978	
# 2143	The Silver Tree	Katrina Britt	February 1978	
# 2144	The Time And The Loving	Marjorie Lewty	February 1978	
# 2145	Portrait Of Jaime	Margaret Way	March 1978	
# 2146	To Play With Fire	Flora Kidd	March 1978	
# 2147	Wild Goose	Mary Wibberley	March 1978	
# 2148	Spring In	Essie Summers	March 1978	
# 2149	Plantation Moon	Gloria Bevan	March 1978	
# 2150	Touched By Fire	Jane Donnelly	March 1978	
# 2151	Timber Boss	Kay Thorpe	March 1978	
# 2152	Lion In Venice	Margaret Rome	March 1978	
# 2153	The Little Dragon	Betty Neels	April 1978	
# 2154	Dream Of Winter	Rebecca Stratton	April 1978	
# 2155	Island Masquerade	Sally Wentworth	April 1978	
# 2156	Lure Of The Falcon	Sue Peters	April 1978	
# 2157	Night Of No Moon	Margaret Chapman	April 1978	
# 2158	Man With A Mission	Ruth Clemence	April 1978	
# 2159	Rafferty's Legacy	Jane Corrie	April 1978	
# 2160	The Shadow Between	Anne Hampson	April 1978	
# 2161	Hawk In A Blue Sky	Charlotte Lamb	May 1978	
# 2162	Handful Of Stardust	Yvonne Whittal	May 1978	
# 2163	Fly Beyond The Sunset	Anne Hampson	May 1978	
# 2164	Year Of The Dragon	Joyce Dingwell	May 1978	
# 2165	A Long Way To Go	Una Rothwell	May 1978	
# 2166	Master At Arms	Betty Beaty	May 1978	
# 2167	Patterson's Island	Jane Corrie	May 1978	
# 2168	Wild Inheritance	Margaret Pargeter	May 1978	
# 2169	Britannia All at Sea	Betty Neels	June 1978	
# 2170	Heart Of The Eagle	Elizabeth Graham	June 1978	
# 2171	The Enchanted Woods	Katrina Britt	June 1978	
# 2172	Breeze From The Bosphorus	Elizabeth Ashton	June 1978	
# 2173	Spindrift	Rebecca Stratton	June 1978	
# 2174	Mutiny In Paradise	Margaret Way	June 1978	
# 2175	The Hills Of Home	Helen Bianchin	June 1978	
# 2176	Second Best Wife	Isobel Chace	June 1978	
# 2177	Lord of the Island	Mary Wibberley	July 1978	
# 2178	Back Of Beyond	Lucy Gillen	July 1978	
# 2179	The Questing Heart	Elizabeth Ashton	July 1978	
# 2180	Image Of Love	Rebecca Stratton	July 1978	
# 2181	Master Of Comus	Charlotte Lamb	July 1978	
# 2182	Under Moonglow	Anne Hampson	July 1978	
# 2183	Better To Forget	Margaret Pargeter	July 1978	
# 2184	Tuesday's Jillaroo	Kerry Allyne	July 1978	
# 2185	King Of The Castle	Sally Wentworth	August 1978	
# 2186	Call Of The Veld	Anne Hampson	August 1978	
# 2187	The Black Hunter	Jane Donnelly	August 1978	
# 2188	The Wild Swan	Margaret Way	August 1978	
# 2189	Remember	Joyce Dingwell	August 1978	
# 2190	Mason's Ridge	Elizabeth Graham	August 1978	
# 2191	Search For Yesterday	Jean S. MacLeod	August 1978	
# 2192	The Golden Girl	Elizabeth Ashton	August 1978	
# 2193	Midnight Magic	Margaret Pargeter	September 1978	
# 2194	The Texan Rancher	Jane Corrie	September 1978	
# 2195	Love For A Stranger	Jane Donnelly	September 1978	
# 2196	The Short Engagement	Marjorie Lewty	September 1978	
# 2197	A Streak Of Gold	Daphne Clair	September 1978	
# 2198	Scars Of Yesterday	Yvonne Whittal	September 1978	
# 2199	A Thousand Miles Away	Dorothy Cork	September 1978	
# 2200	Rendezvous In Venice	Elizabeth Ashton	September 1978	
# 2201	Bargain For Paradise	Rebecca Stratton	October 1978	
# 2202	Philomena's Miracle	Betty Neels	October 1978	
# 2203	The Awakening Flame	Margaret Way	October 1978	
# 2204	Entrance To The Harbour	Sue Peters	October 1978	
# 2205	The Wool King	Kerry Allyne	October 1978	
# 2206	Desert Barbarian	Charlotte Lamb	October 1978	
# 2207	Conflict In Paradise	Sally Wentworth	October 1978	
# 2208	A Stranger's Kiss	Sondra Stanford	October 1978	
# 2209	Peacock's Walk	Jane Corrie	November 1978	
# 2210	To Begin Again	Jan MacLean	November 1978	
# 2211	The Jewelled Caftan	Margaret Pargeter	November 1978	
# 2212	Open Not The Door	Katrina Britt	November 1978	
# 2213	The Dark Side of Marriage	Margery Hilton	November 1978	
# 2214	Country Cousin	Jacqueline Gilbert	November 1978	
# 2215	Leaf In The Storm	Anne Hampson	November 1978	
# 2216	All The Days Of Summer	Joyce Dingwell	November 1978	
# 2217	Spell Of The Seven Stones	Jane Donnelly	December 1978	
# 2218	Unexpected Hazard	Sophie Weston	December 1978	
# 2219	Tiger In Darkness	Rosemary Pollock	December 1978	
# 2220	Rebel In Love	Lilian Peake	December 1978	
# 2221	The Taming Of Tamsin	Mary Wibberley	December 1978	
# 2222	Corsican Bandit	Rebecca Stratton	December 1978	
# 2223	New Man At Cedar Hills	Elizabeth Graham	December 1978	
# 2224	Fringe Of Heaven	Gloria Bevan	December 1978	
