= List of Harlequin Romance novels released in 1976 =

This is a list of Harlequin Romance novels released in 1976. (Main index: List of Harlequin Romance novels)

== Releases ==
Number	Title	Author	Date	Citations
# 1937	Henrietta's Own Castle	Betty Neels	January 1976	
# 1938	Sweet Sanctuary	Charlotte Lamb	January 1976	
# 1939	The Girl At Danes' Dyke	Margaret Rome	January 1976	
# 1940	The Sycamore Song	Elizabeth Hunter	January 1976	
# 1941	Love And The Kentish Maid	Betty Beaty	January 1976	
# 1942	The Fire And The Fury	Rebecca Stratton	January 1976	
# 1943	The Garden Of Dreams	Sara Craven	January 1976	
# 1944	Heart In The Sunlight	Lilian Peake	January 1976	
# 1945	The Desert Castle	Isobel Chace	February 1976	
# 1946	Crown Of Willow	Elizabeth Ashton	February 1976	
# 1947	The Girl In The Blue Dress	Mary Burchell	February 1976	
# 1948	Ross Of Silver Ridge	Gwen Westwood	February 1976	
# 1949	Shining Wanderer	Rose Elver	February 1976	
# 1950	The Beach Of Sweet Returns	Margery Hilton	February 1976	
# 1951	Ride A Black Horse	Margaret Pargeter	February 1976	
# 1952	Corporation Boss	Joyce Dingwell	February 1976	
# 1953	Love's Puppet	Henrietta Reid	March 1976	
# 1954	A Star Looks Down	Betty Neels	March 1976	
# 1955	Moon Tide	Rebecca Stratton	March 1976	
# 1956	The Impossible Boss	Jane Corrie	March 1976	
# 1957	Valley Of Paradise	Margaret Rome	March 1976	
# 1958	All The Long Summer	Lucy Gillen	March 1976	
# 1959	Deep Furrows	Sue Peters	March 1976	
# 1960	Return To Tuckarimba	Amanda Doyle	March 1976	
# 1961	Deep In The Forest	Joyce Dingwell	April 1976	
# 1962	Debt of Honour	Margaret Baumann	April 1976	
# 1963	Smoke Into Flame	Jane Arbor	April 1976	
# 1964	Under The Stars Of Paris	Mary Burchell	April 1976	
# 1965	Escape To Happiness	Mary Whistler	April 1976	
# 1966	Red Diamond	Dorothy Cork	April 1976	
# 1967	Sugar Cane Harvest	Kay Thorpe	April 1976	
# 1968	The Wilderness Hut	Mary Wibberley	April 1976	
# 1969	The Spanish Grandee	Katrina Britt	May 1976	
# 1970	Cobweb Morning	Betty Neels	May 1976	
# 1971	The Hearthfire Glows	Margaret Malcolm	May 1976	
# 1972	Lady In The Limelight	Elizabeth Ashton	May 1976	
# 1973	The Kilted Stranger	Margaret Pargeter	May 1976	
# 1974	A Lesson In Loving	Margaret Way	May 1976	
# 1975	Clouded Waters	Sue Peters	May 1976	
# 1976	The Goddess Of Mavisu	Rebecca Stratton	May 1976	
# 1977	The Dance of Courtship	Flora Kidd	June 1976	
# 1978	The Eye Of The Sun	Dorothy Cork	June 1976	
# 1979	A Handful Of Stars	Lucy Gillen	June 1976	
# 1980	Destiny Paradise	Margaret Mayo	June 1976	
# 1981	The New Broom	Joyce Dingwell	June 1976	
# 1982	Scent Of The Maquis	Barbara Cust	June 1976	
# 1983	The Love Goddess	Norrey Ford	June 1976	
# 1984	The Tenant Of San Mateo	Roumelia Lane	June 1976	
# 1985	Wife Made to Measure	Ruth Clemence	July 1976	
# 1986	Man Of The Wild	Rosemary Carter	July 1976	
# 1987	Moon For Lavinia	Betty Neels	July 1976	
# 1988	My Heart's Desire	Sara Seale	July 1976	
# 1989	My Lady Disdain	Elizabeth Ashton	July 1976	
# 1990	The Royal Affair	Kay Thorpe	July 1976	
# 1991	Isle Of The Golden Drum	Rebecca Stratton	July 1976	
# 1992	Smuggled Love	Doris E. Smith	July 1976	
# 1993	Dark Pursuer	Jane Donnelly	August 1976	
# 1994	The Whispering Gate	Mary Wibberley	August 1976	
# 1995	The Hungry Tide	Lucy Gillen	August 1976	
# 1996	Shades Of Autumn	Margaret Mayo	August 1976	
# 1997	Singing In The Wilderness	Isobel Chace	August 1976	
# 1998	The Road Boss	Joyce Dingwell	August 1976	
# 1999	The Summer Wife	Flora Kidd	August 1976	
# 2000	Not by Appointment	Essie Summers	August 1976	
# 2001	Greek Bridal	Henrietta Reid	September 1976	
# 2002	The Slender Thread	Yvonne Whittal	September 1976	
# 2003	Land Of The Sun	Nerina Hilliard	September 1976	
# 2004	Head Of Chancery	Betty Beaty	September 1976	
# 2005	Goblin Court	Sophie Weston	September 1976	
# 2006	Proud Stranger	Rebecca Stratton	September 1976	
# 2007	Beloved Viking	Suzanna Lynne	September 1976	
# 2008	Dolphin Bay	Gloria Bevan	September 1976	
# 2009	Esmeralda	Betty Neels	October 1976	
# 2010	Bewildered Haven	Helen Bianchin	October 1976	
# 2011	The Windmill of Kalakos	Iris Danbury	October 1976	
# 2012	Return To Deepwater	Lucy Gillen	October 1976	
# 2013	Blossoming Gold	Gwen Westwood	October 1976	
# 2014	Moonglade	Janice Gray	October 1976	
# 2015	Sherringdon Hall	Sheila Douglas	October 1976	
# 2016	Flight Into Yesterday	Margaret Way	October 1976	
# 2017	The Emerald Garden	Katrina Britt	November 1976	
# 2018	Chateau D'Armor	Rebecca Stratton	November 1976	
# 2019	Summer Rainfall	Kerry Allyne	November 1976	
# 2020	Rainbow For Megan	Jane Corrie	November 1976	
# 2021	Beyond The Foothills	Essie Summers	November 1976	
# 2022	Hold Me Captive	Margaret Pargeter	November 1976	
# 2023	The Clouded Veil	Isobel Chace	November 1976	
# 2024	Journey Into Spring	Jean S. MacLeod	November 1976	
# 2025	Roses For Christmas	Betty Neels	December 1976	
# 2026	The House Of Kingdom	Lucy Gillen	December 1976	
# 2027	The Silver Cage	Jane Donnelly	December 1976	
# 2028	Perilous Waters	Margaret Mayo	December 1976	
# 2029	A Kiss For Apollo	Janice Gray	December 1976	
# 2030	One Special Rose	Sue Peters	December 1976	
# 2031	The Moon-Dancers	Mary Wibberley	December 1976	
# 2032	The Bride Price	Elizabeth Hunter	December 1976	
