= List of Harlequin Romance novels released in 2000 =

This is a list of Harlequin Romance novels released in 2000. (Main index: List of Harlequin Romance novels)

== Releases ==
Number	Title	Author	Date	Citations
# 3583	The Daughter Of The Manor	Betty Neels	January 2000	
# 3584	One Man To The Altar	Jeanne Allan	January 2000	
# 3585	Bride	Trisha David	January 2000	
# 3586	New Year...New Family	Grace Green	January 2000	
# 3587	Husband Potential	Rebecca Winters	January 2000	
# 3588	The Feisty Fiancé	Jessica Steele	February 2000	
# 3589	The Billionaire Daddy	Renee Roszel	January 2000	
# 3590	An Arranged Marriage	Susan Fox	February 2000	
# 3591	Her Secret Bodyguard	Day Leclaire	February 2000	
# 3592	One Husband Needed	Jeanne Allan	February 2000	
# 3593	Fiancé Wanted!	Ruth Jean Dale	February 2000	
# 3594	Outback Husband	Jessica Hart	February 2000	
# 3595	A Wife At Kimbara	Margaret Way	March 2000	
# 3596	Rico's Secret Child	Lucy Gordon	March 2000	
# 3597	Substitute Father	Janelle Denison	March 2000	
# 3598	Pamela Taming The Boss	Pamela Bauer and Judy	April 2000	
# 3599	Honeymoon Hitch	Renee Roszel	April 2000	
# 3600	Husband On Demand	Leigh Michaels	April 2000	
# 3601	Matilda's Wedding	Betty Neels	April 2000	
# 3602	A Wife Worth Keeping	Rosemary Carter	April 2000	
# 3603	Coming Home To Wed	Renee Roszel	May 2000	
# 3604	Bride On Loan	Leigh Michaels	June 2000	
# 3605	Just Say Yes!	Caroline Anderson	May 2000	
# 3606	The Marriage Bargain	Susan Fox	May 2000	
# 3607	The Bridesmaid's Wedding	Margaret Way	June 2000	
# 3608	Wife On Approval	Leigh Michaels	June 2000	
# 3609	The Boss's Bride	Emma Richmond	June 2000	
# 3610	Project: Daddy	Patricia Knoll	June 2000	
# 3611	The Bride's Proposition	Day Leclaire	July 2000	
# 3612	Marrying Margot	Barbara McMahon	July 2000	
# 3613	The Wedding Countdown	Barbara Hannay	July 2000	
# 3614	The Baby Surprise	Janelle Denison	July 2000	
# 3615	Bachelor In Need	Jessica Steele	August 2000	
# 3616	A Mother for Mollie	Barbara McMahon	August 2000	
# 3617	The Faithful Bride	Rebecca Winters	August 2000	
# 3618	His Desert Rose	Liz Fielding	August 2000	
# 3619	The English Bride	Margaret Way	September 2000	
# 3620	Georgia's Groom	Barbara McMahon	September 2000	
# 3621	Almost A Wife	Eva Rutland	September 2000	
# 3622	The Baby Project	Grace Green	September 2000	
# 3623	To Marry A Sheikh	Day Leclaire	October 2000	
# 3624	The Best Man And The Bridesmaid	Liz Fielding	October 2000	
# 3625	The Paternity Plan	Heather MacAllister	October 2000	
# 3626	A Winter Love Story	Betty Neels	October 2000	
# 3627	Marriage In Mind	Jessica Steele	November 2000	
# 3628	The Corporate Wife	Leigh Michaels	November 2000	
# 3629	The Motherhood Campaign	Heather MacAllister	November 2000	
# 3630	The Sheikh's Bride	Sophie Weston	November 2000	
# 3631	The Baby Gift	Day Leclaire	December 2000	
# 3632	The Billionaire and the Baby	Rebecca Winters	December 2000	
# 3633	Worthy Of Marriage	Anne Weale	December 2000	
# 3634	The Sheikh's Reward	Lucy Gordon	December 2000	
