= List of Harlequin Romance novels released in 1979 =

This is a list of Harlequin Romance novels released in 1979. (Main index: List of Harlequin Romance novels)

== Releases ==
Number	Title	Author	Date	Citations
# 2225	The Boss's Daughter	Joyce Dingwell	January 1979	
# 2226	Never While The Grass Grows	Betty Neels	January 1979	
# 2227	The Wild Rowan	Margaret Pargeter	January 1979	
# 2228	The Bargain Bride	Flora Kidd	January 1979	
# 2229	Hidden Rapture	Roumelia Lane	January 1979	
# 2230	Harbour Of Love	Anne Hampson	January 1979	
# 2231	Return To Silbersee	Jane Arbor	January 1979	
# 2232	The Wilderness Trail	Kay Thorpe	January 1979	
# 2233	To Tame A Vixen	Anne Hampson	February 1979	
# 2234	Full Circle	Kay Thorpe	February 1979	
# 2235	Son Of Adam	Margaret Rome	February 1979	
# 2236	Sand Through My Fingers	Lee Naughton	February 1979	
# 2237	Return To Silver Creek	Elizabeth Graham	February 1979	
# 2238	The Hills Beyond	Katrina Britt	February 1979	
# 2239	The Lake Of The Kingfisher	Essie Summers	February 1979	
# 2240	Victoria And The Nightingale	Susan Barrie	February 1979	
# 2241	A Man Called Cameron	Margaret Pargeter	March 1979	
# 2242	Forget And Forgive	Dorothy Cork	March 1979	
# 2243	Magic Of The Baobab	Yvonne Whittal	March 1979	
# 2244	Tiger Sky	Rose Elver	March 1979	
# 2245	Witchwood	Mary Wibberley	March 1979	
# 2246	For Love Of A Pagan	Anne Hampson	March 1979	
# 2247	The Willing Hostage	Elizabeth Ashton	March 1979	
# 2248	West Of The Waminda	Kerry Allyne	March 1979	
# 2249	Love Is Eternal	Yvonne Whittal	April 1979	
# 2250	Ring In A Teacup	Betty Neels	April 1979	
# 2251	Late Rapture	Jane Arbor	April 1979	
# 2252	Summer's Lease	Margaret Malcolm	April 1979	
# 2253	Heart Of The Whirlwind	Dorothy Cork	April 1979	
# 2254	Rightful Possession	Sally Wentworth	April 1979	
# 2255	Forest Of The Night	Jane Donnelly	April 1979	
# 2256	The Garden Of The Gods	Elizabeth Ashton	April 1979	
# 2257	The Island Bride	Jane Corrie	May 1979	
# 2258	Wake The Sleeping Tiger	Margaret Way	May 1979	
# 2259	Island Of Escape	Dorothy Cork	May 1979	
# 2260	Marriage Impossible	Margaret Pargeter	May 1979	
# 2261	Lost Heritage	Rebecca Stratton	May 1979	
# 2262	Liberated Lady	Sally Wentworth	May 1979	
# 2263	Man From Down Under	Elizabeth Graham	June 1979	
# 2264	Isle Of Calypso	Margaret Rome	June 1979	
# 2265	The Winds Of Heaven	Margaret Way	June 1979	
# 2266	South Of The Moon	Anne Hampson	June 1979	
# 2267	Love's Sweet Revenge	Mary Wibberley	June 1979	
# 2268	The Eagle Of The Vincella	Rebecca Stratton	June 1979	
# 2269	The Midnight Sun	Katrina Britt	July 1979	
# 2270	Behind A Closed Door	Jane Donnelly	July 1979	
# 2271	Shadow Of Celia	Elizabeth Jeffrey	July 1979	
# 2272	Where The South Wind Blows	Anne Hampson	July 1979	
# 2273	Sweet Compulsion	Victoria Woolf	July 1979	
# 2274	Lark In An Alien Sky	Rebecca Stratton	July 1979	
# 2275	Sun And Candlelight	Betty Neels	August 1979	
# 2276	White Magnolia	Margaret Way	August 1979	
# 2277	The Dark Warrior	Mary Wibberley	August 1979	
# 2278	Kowhai Country	Gloria Bevan	August 1979	
# 2279	Stranger On The Beach	Lilian Peake	August 1979	
# 2280	Afraid To Love	Margaret Mayo	August 1979	
# 2281	My Lady Of The Fuchsias	Essie Summers	September 1979	
# 2282	A Very Special Man	Marjorie Lewty	September 1979	
# 2283	The Plains Of Promise	Kerry Allyne	September 1979	
# 2284	Only You	Margaret Pargeter	September 1979	
# 2285	Caribbean Cocktail	Jane Corrie	September 1979	
# 2286	A Scarf Of Flame	Wynne May	September 1979	
# 2287	Bitter Homecoming	Jan MacLean	October 1979	
# 2288	Walkabout Wife	Dorothy Cork	October 1979	
# 2289	Spring Girl	Jessica Steele	October 1979	
# 2290	Bargain Wife	Mary Burchell	October 1979	
# 2291	Valley Of The Moon	Margaret Way	October 1979	
# 2292	The Sleeping Fire	Daphne Clair	October 1979	
# 2293	A Savage Sanctuary	Jane Donnelly	November 1979	
# 2294	Heart Of The Scorpion	Janice Gray	November 1979	
# 2295	Early Summer	Jan MacLean	November 1979	
# 2296	The Devil's Bride	Margaret Pargeter	November 1979	
# 2297	The Icicle Heart	Jessica Steele	November 1979	
# 2298	Runaway Marriage	Mary Wibberley	November 1979	
# 2299	Pact Without Desire	Jane Arbor	December 1979	
# 2300	Moonlight On The Nile	Elizabeth Ashton	December 1979	
# 2301	The Promise Of Happiness	Betty Neels	December 1979	
# 2302	Hostile Engagement	Jessica Steele	December 1979	
# 2303	Close To The Heart	Rebecca Stratton	December 1979	
# 2304	Bitter Enchantment	Yvonne Whittal	December 1979	
