= List of Harlequin Romance novels released in 2007 =

This is a list of List of Harlequin Romance novels released in 2007. (Main index: List of Harlequin Romance novels)

== Releases ==
Number	Title	Author	Date	Citations
# 3927	Outback Man Seeks Wife	Margaret Way	January 2007	
# 3928	The Nanny And The Sheikh	Barbara McMahon	January 2007	
# 3929	The Businessman's Bride	Jackie Braun	January 2007	
# 3930	Meant-To-Be Mother	Ally Blake	January 2007	
# 3931	Rancher And Protector	Judy Christenberry	February 2007	
# 3932	The Valentine Bride	Liz Fielding	February 2007	
# 3933	One Summer In Italy...	Lucy Gordon	February 2007	
# 3934	The Boss's Pregnancy Proposal	Raye Morgan	February 2007	
# 3935	Crowned: An Ordinary Girl	Natasha Oakley	February 2007	
# 3936	Outback Baby Miracle	Melissa James	February 2007	
# 3937	Cattle Rancher -Convenient Wife	Margaret Way	March 2007	
# 3938	The Maid And The Millionaire	Myrna Mackenzie	March 2007	
# 3939	Barefoot Bride	Jessica Hart	March 2007	
# 3940	The Prince And The Nanny	Cara Colter	March 2007	
# 3941	Their Very Special Gift	Jackie Braun	March 2007	
# 3942	Her Parenthood Assignment	Fiona Harper	March 2007	
# 3943	Raising The Rancher's Family	Patricia Thayer	April 2007	
# 3944	Matrimony With His Majesty	Rebecca Winters	April 2007	
# 3945	The Sheikh's Reluctant Bride	Teresa Southwick	April 2007	
# 3946	In The Heart Of The Outback...	Barbara Hannay	April 2007	
# 3947	Marriage For Baby	Melissa McClone	April 2007	
# 3948	Rescued: Mother-To-Be	Trish Wylie	April 2007	
# 3949	The Sheriff's Pregnant Wife	Patricia Thayer	May 2007	
# 3950	The Prince's Outback Bride	Marion Lennox	May 2007	
# 3951	The Secret Life Of Lady Gabriella	Liz Fielding	May 2007	
# 3952	Back To Mr & Mrs	Shirley Jump	May 2007	
# 3953	Memo: Marry Me?	Jennie Adams	May 2007	
# 3954	Hired By The Cowboy	Donna Alward	May 2007	
# 3955	A Mother For The Tycoon's Child	Patricia Thayer	June 2007	
# 3956	The Boss And His Secretary	Jessica Steele	June 2007	
# 3957	The Sheikh's Contract Bride	Teresa Southwick	June 2007	
# 3958	Married By Morning	Shirley Jump	June 2007	
# 3959	Billionaire On Her Doorstep	Ally Blake	June 2007	
# 3960	Princess Australia	Nicola Marsh	June 2007	
# 3961	The Cowboy's Secret Son	Judy Christenberry	July 2007	
# 3962	The Lazaridis Marriage	Rebecca Winters	July 2007	
# 3963	The Forbidden Brother	Barbara McMahon	July 2007	
# 3964	Bride Of The Emerald Isle	Trish Wylie	July 2007	
# 3965	Her Outback Knight	Melissa James	July 2007	
# 3966	Best Friend...Future Wife	Claire Baxter	July 2007	
# 3967	Marrying Her Billionaire Boss	Myrna Mackenzie	August 2007	
# 3968	The Italian's Wife By Sunset	Lucy Gordon	August 2007	
# 3969	His Miracle Bride	Marion Lennox	August 2007	
# 3970	Reunited: Marriage In A Million	Liz Fielding	August 2007	
# 3971	Baby Twins: Parents Needed	Teresa Carpenter	August 2007	
# 3972	Break Up To Make Up	Fiona Harper	August 2007	
# 3973	Promoted: Nanny To Wife	Margaret Way	September 2007	
# 3974	The Bridal Contract	Susan Fox	September 2007	
# 3975	Outback boss - City Bride	Jessica Hart	September 2007	
# 3976	Needed: Her Mr. Right	Barbara Hannay	September 2007	
# 3977	The Italian Single Dad	Jennie Adams	September 2007	
# 3978	Marriage At Circle M	Donna Alward	September 2007	
# 3979	The Duke's Baby	Rebecca Winters	October 2007	
# 3980	The Mediterranean Rebel's Bride	Lucy Gordon	October 2007	
# 3981	Her Pregnancy Surprise	Susan Meier	October 2007	
# 3982	Found: Her Long Lost Husband	Jackie Braun	October 2007	
# 3983	Their Christmas Wish Come True	Cara Colter	October 2007	
# 3984	Millionaire To The Rescue	Ally Blake	October 2007	
# 3985	Winter Roses	Diana Palmer	November 2007	
# 3986	The Cowboy's Christmas Proposal	Judy Christenberry	November 2007	
# 3987	Appointment At The Altar	Jessica Hart	November 2007	
# 3988	The Boss's Double Trouble Twins	Raye Morgan	November 2007	
# 3989	Caring For His Baby	Caroline Anderson	November 2007	
# 3990	Miracle On Christmas Eve	Shirley Jump	November 2007	
# 3991	Snowbound With Mr. Right	Judy Christenberry	December 2007	
# 3992	The Millionaire Tycoon's English Rose	Lucy Gordon	December 2007	
# 3993	The Boss's Little Miracle	Barbara McMahon	December 2007	
# 3994	Their Greek Island Reunion	Carol Grace	December 2007	
# 3995	Win, Lose...Or Wed!	Melissa Mcclone	December 2007	
# 3996	His Christmas Angel	Michelle Douglas	December 2007	
