= List of Harlequin Romance novels released in 1997 =

This is a list of Harlequin Romance novels released in 1997. (Main index: List of Harlequin Romance novels)

== Releases ==
Number	Title	Author	Date	Citations
# 3439	Marriage Bait	Eva Rutland	January 1997	
# 3440	Shotgun Marriage	Day Leclaire	January 1997	
# 3441	Runaway Honeymoon	Ruth Jean Dale	January 1997	
# 3442	Two-Parent Family	Patricia Knoll	January 1997	
# 3443	Three Little Miracles	Rebecca Winters	February 1997	
# 3444	The Perfect Divorce!	Leigh Michaels	February 1997	
# 3445	Marry Me	Heather Allison	February 1997	
# 3446	Sweet Valentine	Val Daniels	February 1997	
# 3447	Wife-To-Be	Jessica Hart	March 1997	
# 3448	Getting Over Harry	Renee Roszel	March 1997	
# 3449	The Second Bride	Catherine George	March 1997	
# 3450	His Brother's Child	Lucy Gordon	March 1997	
# 3451	Angel Bride	Barbara McMahon	April 1997	
# 3452	The Wedding Escapade	Kate Denton	April 1997	
# 3453	First-Time Father	Emma Richmond	April 1997	
# 3454	Fate Takes A Hand	Betty Neels	April 1997	
# 3455	Georgia And The Tycoon	Margaret Way	May 1997	
# 3456	Needed: One Dad	Jeanne Allan	May 1997	
# 3457	The Secret Baby	Day Leclaire	May 1997	
# 3458	Borrowed Wife	Patricia Wilson	May 1997	
# 3459	With His Ring	Jessica Steele	June 1997	
# 3460	Second-Best Wife	Rebecca Winters	June 1997	
# 3461	For Baby's Sake	Val Daniels	June 1997	
# 3462	A Double Wedding	Patricia Knoll	June 1997	
# 3463	Baby, You're Mine!	Leigh Michaels	July 1997	
# 3464	The Ninety-Day Wife	Emma Goldrick	July 1997	
# 3465	Breakfast In Bed	Ruth Jean Dale	July 1997	
# 3466	His Cinderella Bride	Heather Allison	July 1997	
# 3467	The Right Kind Of Girl	Betty Neels	August 1997	
# 3468	Wild At Heart	Susan Fox	August 1997	
# 3469	Rebel Without A Bride	Catherine Leigh	August 1997	
# 3470	To Marry A Stranger	Renee Roszel	August 1997	
# 3471	Do You Take This Cowboy?	Jeanne Allan	September 1997	
# 3472	McAllister's Baby	Trisha David	September 1997	
# 3473	Bride On The Ranch	Barbara McMahon	September 1997	
# 3474	A Marriage Has Been Arranged	Anne Weale	September 1997	
# 3475	Found: One Father	Shannon Waverly	October 1997	
# 3476	Holding On To Alex	Margaret Way	October 1997	
# 3477	No Wife Required!	Rebecca Winters	October 1997	
# 3478	The Fake Fiancé!	Leigh Michaels	October 1997	
# 3479	A Business Engagement	Jessica Steele	November 1997	
# 3480	Daniel And Daughter	Lucy Gordon	November 1997	
# 3481	Baby In The Boardroom	Rosemary Gibson	November 1997	
# 3482	A Marriage Worth Keeping	Kate Denton	November 1997	
# 3483	The Mistletoe Kiss	Betty Neels	December 1997	
# 3484	Reform Of The Rake	Catherine George	December 1997	
# 3485	A Wife For Christmas	Pamela Bauer and Judy Kaye	December 1997	
# 3486	Her Secret Santa	Day Leclaire	December 1997	
