= List of Harlequin Romance novels released in 1955 =

This is a list of Harlequin Romance novels released in 1955. (Main index: List of Harlequin Romance novels)

== Releases ==
Number	Title	Author	Date	Citations
# 323	Tiger By The Tail	James Hadley Chase	1955	
# 324	West End Nurse	Lucy Agnes Hancock	1955	
# 325	Satan's Range	Al Cody	1955	
# 326	Girl Intern	Elizabeth Seifert	1955	
# 327	The World's Worst Women	Bernard O'Donnell	1955	
# 328	The Wife Traders	Arthur Stringer	1955	
# 329	People Of The Night	Victor Russell	1955	
# 330	Convict Town	E.V. Timms	1955	
# 331	Woman In Chains	E.V. Timms	1955	
# 332	Staff Nurse	Lucy Agnes Hancock	1955	
# 333	Resident Nurse	Lucy Agnes Hancock	1955	
# 334	The Square Emerald	Edgar Wallace	1955	
# 335	Hoodlum Alley	Albert E. Ullman	1955	
# 336	The Good And The Bad	Joan Fleming	1955	
# 337	The Man in the Brown Suit	Agatha Christie	1955	
# 338	District Nurse	Lucy Agnes Hancock	1955	
# 339	Nurses Are People	Lucy Agnes Hancock	1955	
# 340	The Pick-Up	Raymond Marshall	1955	
# 341	Ruthless	Raymond Marshall	1955	
# 342	Nancy Craig, R.N.	Marcia Ford	1955	
# 343	Gun Thunder Valley	Al Cody	1955	
# 344	Village Doctor	Lucy Agnes Hancock	1955	
# 345	The Gunman	Al Cody	1955	
# 346	Doctor Bill	Lucy Agnes Hancock	1955	
# 347	Pat Whitney, R.N.	Lucy Agnes Hancock	1955	
