= List of Harlequin Romance novels released in 1996 =

This is a list of Harlequin Romance novels released in 1996. (Main index: List of Harlequin Romance novels)

== Releases ==
Number	Title	Author	Date	Citation
# 3391	A Faulkner Possession	Margaret Way	January 1996	
# 3392	Husband Material	Emma Goldrick	January 1996	
# 3393	Tomorrow's Bride	Alexandra Scott	January 1996	
# 3394	Passion's Prey	Rebecca King	January 1996	
# 3395	Because of the Baby	Debbie Macomber	February 1996	
# 3396	Fallen Hero	Catherine George	February 1996	
# 3397	To Lasso a Lady	Renee Roszel	February 1996	
# 3398	Valentine, Texas	Kate Denton	February 1996	
# 3399	Falling for Him	Debbie Macomber	March 1996	
# 3400	Waiting for Deborah	Betty Neels	March 1996	
# 3401	The Only Man for Maggie	Leigh Michaels	March 1996	
# 3402	Clanton's Woman	Patricia Knoll	March 1996	
# 3403	Ending in Marriage	Debbie Macomber	April 1996	
# 3404	Make Believe Engagement	Day Leclaire	April 1996	
# 3405	A Dangerous Magic	Patricia Wilson	April 1996	
# 3406	The Right Kind of Man	Jessica Hart	April 1996	
# 3407	The Marriage Business	Jessica Steele	May 1996	
# 3408	Moving in with Adam	Jeanne Allan	May 1996	
# 3409	The Badlands Bride	Rebecca Winters	May 1996	
# 3410	For the Love of Emma	Lucy Gordon	May 1996	
# 3411	The Daddy Trap	Leigh Michaels	June 1996	
# 3412	Private Dancer	Eva Rutland	June 1996	
# 3413	Runaway Wedding	Ruth Jean Dale	June 1996	
# 3414	The Bride's Daughter	Rosemary Gibson	June 1996	
# 3415	The Bachelor's Wedding	Betty Neels	July 1996	
# 3416	A Wife in Waiting	Jessica Steele	July 1996	
# 3417	Coming Home	Patricia Wilson	July 1996	
# 3418	A Ranch, a Ring and Everything	Val Daniels	July 1996	
# 3419	Kit and the Cowboy	Rebecca Winters	August 1996	
# 3420	Earthbound Angel	Catherine George	August 1996	
# 3421	Temporary Texan	Heather Allison	August 1996	
# 3422	Desperately Seeking Annie	Patricia Knoll	August 1996	
# 3423	Marrying the Boss!	Leigh Michaels	September 1996	
# 3424	A Simple Texas Wedding	Ruth Jean Dale	September 1996	
# 3425	Rebel in Disguise	Lucy Gordon	September 1996	
# 3426	Something Old, Something New	Catherine Leigh	September 1996	
# 3427	Husbands on Horseback	Diana Palmer & Margaret Way	October 1996	
# 3428	Wyoming Wedding	Barbara McMahon	October 1996	
# 3429	Working Girl	Jessica Hart	October 1996	
# 3430	The Bachelor Chase	Emma Richmond	October 1996	
# 3431	Bringing Up Babies	Emma Goldrick	November 1996	
# 3432	The Cowboy Wants a Wife!	Susan Fox	November 1996	
# 3433	Temporary Husband	Day Leclaire	November 1996	
# 3434	Dream Wedding	Helen Brooks	November 1996	
# 3435	Dearest Mary Jane	Betty Neels	December 1996	
# 3436	Unexpected Engagement	Jessica Steele	December 1996	
# 3437	A Mistletoe Marriage	Jeanne Allan	December 1996	
# 3438	Accidental Wife	Day Leclaire	December 1996	
