= List of Harlequin Romance novels released in 1977 =

This is a list of Harlequin Romance novels released in 1977. (Main index: List of Harlequin Romance novels)

== Releases ==
Number	Title	Author	Date	Citations
# 2033	Tree Of Paradise	Jane Arbor	January 1977	
# 2034	Green Folly	Marguerite Lees	January 1977	
# 2035	A Canopy Of Rose Leaves	Isobel Chace	January 1977	
# 2036	The Road To Gafsa	Rebecca Stratton	January 1977	
# 2037	Flight To Fantasy	Margaret Malcolm	January 1977	
# 2038	Sinclair Territory	Jane Corrie	January 1977	
# 2039	If Today Be Sweet	Katrina Britt	January 1977	
# 2040	Sister To Meryl	Nerina Hilliard	January 1977	
# 2041	The Edge Of Winter	Betty Neels	February 1977	
# 2042	The Scented Island	Iris Danbury	February 1977	
# 2043	Elusive Harmony	Mary Burchell	February 1977	
# 2044	Mountain Heritage	Elizabeth Ashton	February 1977	
# 2045	Child Of Tahiti	Rebecca Caine	February 1977	
# 2046	Safari South	Kay Thorpe	February 1977	
# 2047	Inland Paradise	Joyce Dingwell	February 1977	
# 2048	The Realms Of Gold	Elizabeth Hunter	February 1977	
# 2049	The Tartan Ribbon	Henrietta Reid	March 1977	
# 2050	Gemini Child	Rebecca Stratton	March 1977	
# 2051	Land Of Ice And Fire	Margaret Mayo	March 1977	
# 2052	Bride Of Zarco	Margaret Rome	March 1977	
# 2053	Green Paddocks	Jane Corrie	March 1977	
# 2054	Fire Mountain	Rose Elver	March 1977	
# 2055	A Sense Of Words	Madeline Charlton	March 1977	
# 2056	The Black Knight	Flora Kidd	March 1977	
# 2057	Dreamtime At Big Sky	Dorothy Cork	April 1977	
# 2058	Blue Skies, Dark Waters	Margaret Pargeter	April 1977	
# 2059	The Silver Link	Mary Wibberley	April 1977	
# 2060	The Man On Half-Moon	Margaret Way	April 1977	
# 2061	Honey	Mary Burchell	April 1977	
# 2062	The Girl From Finlay's River	Elizabeth Graham	April 1977	
# 2063	A Gem Of A Girl	Betty Neels	April 1977	
# 2064	The Intruder	Jane Donnelly	April 1977	
# 2065	The Whistling Thorn	Isobel Chace	May 1977	
# 2066	Two Pins In A Fountain	Jane Arbor	May 1977	
# 2067	Summer Comes Slowly	Rosemary Pollock	May 1977	
# 2068	Goblin Hill	Essie Summers	May 1977	
# 2069	Fly Away, Love	Betty Beaty	May 1977	
# 2070	The Villa Faustino	Katrina Britt	May 1977	
# 2071	Wild Heart	Doris E. Smith	May 1977	
# 2072	The Bahamian Pirate	Jane Corrie	May 1977	
# 2073	Bachelor Territory	Gloria Bevan	June 1977	
# 2074	Swans' Reach	Margaret Way	June 1977	
# 2075	To Catch A Butterfly	Marjorie Lewty	June 1977	
# 2076	Aegean Quest	Elizabeth Ashton	June 1977	
# 2077	Devil's Gateway	Yvonne Whittal	June 1977	
# 2078	Girl In A White Hat	Rebecca Stratton	June 1977	
# 2079	The River Lord	Kay Thorpe	June 1977	
# 2080	A Small Slice of Summer	Betty Neels	June 1977	
# 2081	Bride Of Bonamour	Gwen Westwood	July 1977	
# 2082	Call Of The Outback	Anne Hampson	July 1977	
# 2083	Festival Summer	Charlotte Lamb	July 1977	
# 2084	Avenging Angel	Helen Bianchin	July 1977	
# 2085	Dark Venturer	Mary Wibberley	July 1977	
# 2086	Rainbow Magic	Margaret Mayo	July 1977	
# 2087	Dangerous Alliance	Jane Corrie	July 1977	
# 2088	The Shores Of Eden	Elizabeth Graham	July 1977	
# 2089	Green For A Season	Janice Gray	August 1977	
# 2090	Dear Caliban	Jane Donnelly	August 1977	
# 2091	Inherit The Sun	Rebecca Stratton	August 1977	
# 2092	Master Of Ben Ross	Lucy Gillen	August 1977	
# 2093	Voyage Of Enchantment	Elizabeth Ashton	August 1977	
# 2094	Bound For Marandoo	Kerry Allyne	August 1977	
# 2095	A Matter Of Chance	Betty Neels	August 1977	
# 2096	The Thistle And The Rose	Margaret Rome	August 1977	
# 2097	The Reluctant Neighbour	Sheila Douglas	September 1977	
# 2098	Rimmer's Way	Jane Corrie	September 1977	
# 2099	Boss Of Bali Creek	Anne Hampson	September 1977	
# 2100	A Plantation of Vines	Wynne May	September 1977	
# 2101	Where Seagulls Cry	Yvonne Whittal	September 1977	
# 2102	Every Wise Man	Jacqueline Gilbert	September 1977	
# 2103	Florentine Spring	Charlotte Lamb	September 1977	
# 2104	Portrait Of Paradise	Sue Peters	September 1977	
# 2105	Wildcat Tamed	Mary Wibberley	October 1977	
# 2106	More Than A Dream	Rebecca Stratton	October 1977	
# 2107	Bamboo Wedding	Roumelia Lane	October 1977	
# 2108	A Growing Moon	Jane Arbor	October 1977	
# 2109	Storm Passage	Kay Thorpe	October 1977	
# 2110	The Hasty Marriage	Betty Neels	October 1977	
# 2111	One Way Ticket	Margaret Way	October 1977	
# 2112	Never Go Back	Margaret Pargeter	October 1977	
# 2113	Push The Past Behind	Henrietta Reid	November 1977	
# 2114	The Mouth Of Truth	Isobel Chace	November 1977	
# 2115	Breakers On The Beach	Dorothy Cork	November 1977	
# 2116	Green Harvest	Elizabeth Ashton	November 1977	
# 2117	The Fountain of Love	Norrey Ford	November 1977	
# 2118	Sea Gypsy	Margaret Mayo	November 1977	
# 2119	Moon Without Stars	Anne Hampson	November 1977	
# 2120	Pride Of Madeira	Elizabeth Hunter	November 1977	
# 2121	The Faithful Heart	Katrina Britt	December 1977	
# 2122	The Painted Palace	Iris Danbury	December 1977	
# 2123	A Drift Of Jasmine	Joyce Dingwell	December 1977	
# 2124	Four Weeks In Winter	Jane Donnelly	December 1977	
# 2125	The Gift Of Love	Margaret Chapman	December 1977	
# 2126	Fraser's Bride	Elizabeth Graham	December 1977	
# 2127	Grasp A Nettle	Betty Neels	December 1977	
# 2128	Price Of Happiness	Yvonne Whittal	December 1977	
