= List of Harlequin Romance novels released in 1989 =

This is a list of Harlequin Romance novels released in 1989.

== Releases ==
Number	Title	Author	Date	Citations
# 2953	Blind To Love	Rebecca Winters	January 1989	
# 2954	Fetters Of Gold	Jane Donnelly	January 1989	
# 2955	Unexpected Inheritance	Margaret Mayo	January 1989	
# 2956	When Two Paths Meet	Betty Neels	January 1989	
# 2957	The Cinderella Trap	Kate Walker	January 1989	
# 2958	Devil Moon	Margaret Way	January 1989	
# 2959	Painted Lady	Diana Hamilton	February 1989	
# 2960	Only My Dreams	Rowan Kirby	February 1989	
# 2961	Always A Bridesmaid	Patricia Knoll	February 1989	
# 2962	Storm Clouds Gathering	Edwina Shore	February 1989	
# 2963	Yesterday's Enemy	Lee Stafford	February 1989	
# 2964	Without Love	Jessica Steele	February 1989	
# 2965	No Greater Joy	Rosemary Carter	March 1989	
# 2966	A Business Arrangement	Kate Denton	March 1989	
# 2967	The Latimore Bride	Emma Goldrick	March 1989	
# 2968	Model For Love	Rosemary Hammond	March 1989	
# 2969	Centrefold	Valerie Parv	March 1989	
# 2970	That Dear Perfection	Alison York	March 1989	
# 2971	Remember, In Jamaica	Katherine Arthur	April 1989	
# 2972	No Love In Return	Elizabeth Barnes	April 1989	
# 2973	Snowfire	Dana James	April 1989	
# 2974	Sympathetic Strangers	Annabel Murray	April 1989	
# 2975	Bed, Breakfast and Bedlam	Marcella Thompson	April 1989	
# 2976	Mowana Magic	Margaret Way	April 1989	
# 2977	Ransomed Heart	Ann Charlton	May 1989	
# 2978	Song Of Love	Rachel Elliot	May 1989	
# 2979	The Wild Side	Diana Hamilton	May 1989	
# 2980	Without Rainbows	Virginia Hart	May 1989	
# 2981	Alien Moonlight	Kate Kingston	May 1989	
# 2982	When The Loving Stopped	Jessica Steele	May 1989	
# 2983	Not Part Of The Bargain	Susan Fox	June 1989	
# 2984	Pilgrim's Promise	Emma Goldrick	June 1989	
# 2985	Bittersweet Honeymoon	Marjorie Lewty	June 1989	
# 2986	A Stranger's Glance	Jessica Marchant	June 1989	
# 2987	Just A Normal Marriage	Leigh Michaels	June 1989	
# 2988	But Never Love	Lynsey Stevens	June 1989	
# 2989	One Reckless Moment	Jeanne Allan	July 1989	
# 2990	Man Of The High Plains	Kerry Allyne	July 1989	
# 2991	Through Eyes of Love	Katherine Arthur	July 1989	
# 2992	Pool Of Dreaming	Dana James	July 1989	
# 2993	Yours And Mine	Debbie Macomber	July 1989	
# 2994	Eye Of Heaven	Michelle Reid	July 1989	
# 2995	Some Enchanted Evening	Jenny Arden	August 1989	
# 2996	Lord Of The Lodge	Miriam MacGregor	August 1989	
# 2997	Shades Of Yesterday	Leigh Michaels	August 1989	
# 2998	Love On A String	Celia Scott	August 1989	
# 2999	The Hungry Heart	Margaret Way	August 1989	
# 3000	The Lost Moon Flower	Bethany Campbell	August 1989	
# 3001	Unconditional Love	Claudia Jameson	September 1989	
# 3002	Send In The Clown	Patricia Knoll	September 1989	
# 3003	Bittersweet Pursuit	Margaret Mayo	September 1989	
# 3004	Paradise For Two	Betty Neels	September 1989	
# 3005	Crocodile Creek	Valerie Parv	September 1989	
# 3006	Still Temptation	Angela Wells	September 1989	
# 3007	Blueprint For Love	Amanda Clark	October 1989	
# 3008	Heart Of Marble	Helena Dawson	October 1989	
# 3009	Tender Offer	Peggy Nicholson	October 1989	
# 3010	No Place Like Home	Leigh Michaels	October 1989	
# 3011	To Stay Forever	Jessica Steele	October 1989	
# 3012	Rise Of An Eagle	Margaret Way	October 1989	
# 3013	The Marrying Game	Lindsay Armstrong	November 1989	
# 3014	Loving Deceiver	Katherine Arthur	November 1989	
# 3015	Under A Summer Sun	Samantha Day	November 1989	
# 3016	A Perfect Beast	Kay Gregory	November 1989	
# 3017	Troublemaker	Madeleine Ker	November 1989	
# 3018	Unwilling Woman	Sue Peters	November 1989	
# 3019	The Snow Garden	Bethany Campbell	December 1989	
# 3020	Folly To Love	Lynn Jacobs	December 1989	
# 3021	Letters Of Love	Judy Kaye	December 1989	
# 3022	Riddell Of Rivermoon	Miriam MacGregor	December 1989	
# 3023	Let Me Count The Ways	Leigh Michaels	December 1989	
# 3024	The Fateful Bargain	Betty Neels	December 1989	
