= List of Harlequin Romance novels released in 1957 =

This is a list of Harlequin Romance novels released in 1957. (Main index: List of Harlequin Romance novels)

== Releases ==
Number	Title	Author	Date	Citations
# 376	Blake Hospital	Dorothy Worley	1957	
# 377	The Secret of Chimneys	Agatha Christie	1957	
# 378	The Ringer	Edgar Wallace	1957	
# 379	The Doctor Takes A Wife	Elizabeth Seifert	1957	
# 380	The River's End	James Oliver Curwood	1957	
# 381	Doctor Joel	Watkins E. Wright	1957	
# 382	Never Trust A Woman	Raymond Marshall	1957	
# 383	The Valley of Silent Men	James Oliver Curwood	1957	
# 384	Nurse Ellen	Peggy Dern	1957	
# 385	Eve	James Hadley Chase	1957	
# 386	The Faro Kid	Leslie Ernenwein	1957	
# 387	White Face	Edgar Wallace	1957	
# 388	Doctor Scott	Peggy Dern	1957	
# 389	Circle F Cowboy	Chuck Martin	1957	
# 390	Adopted Derelicts	Bluebell S. Phillips	1957	
# 391	How To Get More From Your Car	W.J. Young, E.R. McCrea	1957	
# 392	Doctor of Mercy	Elizabeth Seifert	1957	
# 393	A Forest of Eyes	Victor Canning	1957	
# 394	Lady Doctor	Peggy Gaddis	1957	
# 395	The Angel of Terror	Edgar Wallace	1957	
# 396	Double Cross Ranch	Will Watson	1957	
# 397	The Shorn Lamb	Lucy Agnes Hancock	1957	
# 398	Sagebrush	Wade Hamilton	1957	
# 399	Royce of the Royal Mounted	Amos Moore	1957	
# 400	The Cage	Sydney Horler	1957 (Note: Reprint)	
# 401	The Doctor Disagrees	Elizabeth Seifert	1957	
# 402	The Football Gravy Train	Frank O'Rourke	1957	
# 403	Next of Kin	George Goodchild	1957	
# 404	Law in the Saddle	Paul Evan Lehman	1957	
# 405	City Nurse	Peggy Gaddis	1957	
# 406	The Flaming Forest	James Oliver Curwood	1957	
# 407	The Hospital in Buwambo	Anne Vinton	1957	
# 408	Rink Rat	Don MacMillan	1957 (Note: Reprint)	
