= Golden Salamander =

Golden Salamander may refer to

- The Golden Salamander, a 1949 thriller novel by Victor Canning
- Golden Salamander (film), a 1950 film adaptation starring Trevor Howard
- "The Golden Salamander", a song on the Acoustic Squabs album Baroque & Roll

== See also ==
- Salamandra atra aurorae, often called the golden alpine salamander, a subspecies of the alpine salamander
