= Finchley (disambiguation) =

Finchley is an area of London.

Finchley may also refer to:

- East Finchley, London
- Municipal Borough of Finchley, former local authority
- Finchley (electoral division), former Greater London Council electoral division
- Finchley (UK Parliament constituency), former constituency
- Mr. Finchley, a fictional character in three comic novels by Victor Canning
- Sondra Finchley, a character in the 1925 novel An American Tragedy by Theodore Dreiser

== See also ==
- Finchley Central (disambiguation)
