= Adrian Spies =

American screenwriter (1920–1998)

- Born: Newark, New Jersey, United States
- Died: October 2, 1998 (aged 78); Los Angeles, California, United States
- Occupation: Screenwriter

Adrian Spies (April 17, 1920 – October 2, 1998) was an American screenwriter, active from the 1940s through to the 1980s.

He won an Edgar Award for an episode of Studio One in Hollywood and was nominated for an Emmy Award for an episode of Dr. Kildare.

Spies died during heart surgery in 1998.

== Filmography ==
=== Films ===
Year	Film	Credit	Notes
1963	Niets dan de waarheid	Screenplay By	
1967	The Scorpio Letters	Screenplay By	Based on the novel The Scorpio Letters By "Victor Canning"
1968	Dark of the Sun	Screenplay By	Co-Wrote Screenplay with "Quentin Werty", Based on the novel "The Dark of the Sun" By "Wilbur Smith"
1970	Hauser's Memory	Screenplay By	Based on the novel "Hauser's Memory" By "Curt Siodmak"
1971	The Failing of Raymond	Written By	
1974	The Family Kovack	Written By	Co-Wrote screenplay with "Elinor Karpf"
1976	Risko	Written By	Co-Wrote screenplay with "Bill Driskill"
1979	The Ordeal of Patty Hearst	Written By	
1979	Hanging By a Thread	Written By	

=== Television ===
Year	TV Series	Credit	Notes
1949	The Crisis	Actor	
1950	Star of the Family	Writer	
1950–55	Robert Montgomery Presents	Writer	16 Episodes
1952	The Doctor	Writer	1 Episode
1953-57	Schlitz Playhouse	Writer	3 Episodes
1953-57	Valiant Lady	Writer	
1953–58	Studio One in Hollywood	Writer	3 Episodes
1954	Waterfront	Writer	1 Episode
1955–57	Climax!	Writer	7 Episodes
1956	Front Row Center	Writer	1 Episode
1956	Matinee Theater	Writer	1 Episode
1956	General Electric Summer Originals	Writer	1 Episode
1957	Wagon Train	Writer	1 Episode
1957–58	The Walter Winchell File	Writer	4 Episodes
1958	Panic!	Writer	1 Episode
1958	Pursuit	Writer	1 Episode
1958	Alcoa Theatre	Writer	2 Episodes
1958–60	Westinghouse Desilu Playhouse	Writer	6 Episodes
1959–60	Playhouse 90	Writer	2 Episodes
1960	The Chevy Mystery Show	Writer	2 Episodes
1961	The Untouchables	Writer	1 Episode
1961	Drama 61-67	Writer	1 Episode
1961	The Asphalt Jungle	Writer	1 Episode
1961	The Defenders	Writer	1 Episode
1961-62	The Dick Powell Show	Writer	3 Episodes
1961-62	Target: The Corruptors!	Writer	3 Episodes
1962	Kraft Mystery Theater	Writer	1 Episode
1962	Saints And Sinners	Writer, Creator, Producer	
1963	The Doctors and the Nurses	Writer	1 Episode
1963–65	Dr.Kildare	Writer	5 Episodes
1966	A Man Called Shenandoah	Writer	1 Episode
1966	Felony Squad	Writer	2 Episodes
1966	Star Trek: The Original Series	Writer	1 Episode
1967	The Danny Thomas Hour	Writer	1 Episode
1969	The Bold Ones: The Protectors	Writer	1 Episode
1970	Bracken's World	Writer	1 Episode
1971	Hawaii Five-O	Writer	2 Episodes
1971	The Man and the City	Writer	1 Episode
1971-72	Ironside	Writer	2 Episodes
1971-72	Marcus Welby, M.D.	Writer	2 Episodes
1973	Police Story	Writer	1 Episode
1975	Doctors' Hospital	Writer	1 Episode
1976	Baretta	Writer	1 Episode
1976	Gibbsville	Writer	1 Episode
1977	Hunter	Writer	1 Episode
1985	T.J. Hooker	Writer	1 Episode
1989	In the Heat of the Night	Writer	1 Episode
