= Mr. Finchley Takes the Road =

1938 novel

- First edition
- Author: Victor Canning
- Language: English
- Genre: Comedy
- Publisher: Hodder and Stoughton
- Publication date: 1940
- Publication place: United Kingdom
- Media type: Print
- Pages: 320
- ISBN: 9781788421638
- Preceded by: Mr. Finchley Goes to Paris

Mr. Finchley Takes the Road is a 1940 comedy novel by the British writer Victor Canning. It was the final part of a trilogy featuring the mild-mannered Edgar Finchley who had been introduced in the 1934 novel Mr. Finchley Discovers His England. First publication was by Hodder and Stoughton with an American edition by Carrick and Evans. It was included in the 1973 Uniform Edition by Heinemann, and has been reissued by Farrago Books in 2019. In 1993 it was adapted for radio by the BBC starring Richard Griffiths.

== Synopsis ==
The newly married Mr. Finchley takes a fancy to a horse-drawn caravan and buys it. He travels around Kent while house hunting and enjoys a fresh series of adventures.

== Bibliography ==
- Ehland, Christoph and Wächter, Cornelia. Middlebrow and Gender, 1890-1945. BRILL, 2016.
- Reilly, John M. Twentieth Century Crime & Mystery Writers. Springer, 2015.
