= Matthew Silverman (novel) =

1937 novel

- First edition
- Author: Victor Canning
- Language: English
- Genre: Drama
- Publisher: Hodder & Stoughton
- Publication date: 1937
- Publication place: United Kingdom
- Media type: Print
- Pages: 316
- ISBN: 9781788421782

Matthew Silverman is a 1937 novel by the British writer Victor Canning, his sixth. Canning had made his name with the comedy novel Mr. Finchley Discovers His England and wrote a number of works focusing on more everyday aspects of British life before later switching to be a well-known author of thrillers. The first publisher was Hodder and Stoughton, but a new edition has recently (2019) appeared from Farrago Books under the title The Uncertain Future of the Silvermans.

== Synopsis ==
The story revolves around the title character, the editor of a local newspaper in Swanbridge around fifty miles from London. He is the fourth generation to manage the business, established by his great-grandfather, but to his dismay his eldest son George shows no interest in journalism and instead devotes himself to missionary work with the London poor. The second son Alexander reluctantly forsakes a career in architecture and brings his friend Harold in to assist. Together they help revolutionize the newspaper, reversing its decline under Matthew's management. Matthew's daughter Loraine is attracted both to Harold and a fashionable novelist Austin Swing.

== Bibliography ==
- Reilly, John M. Twentieth Century Crime & Mystery Writers. Springer, 2015.
