= Barbara Harris (actress) =

American actress (1935–2018)

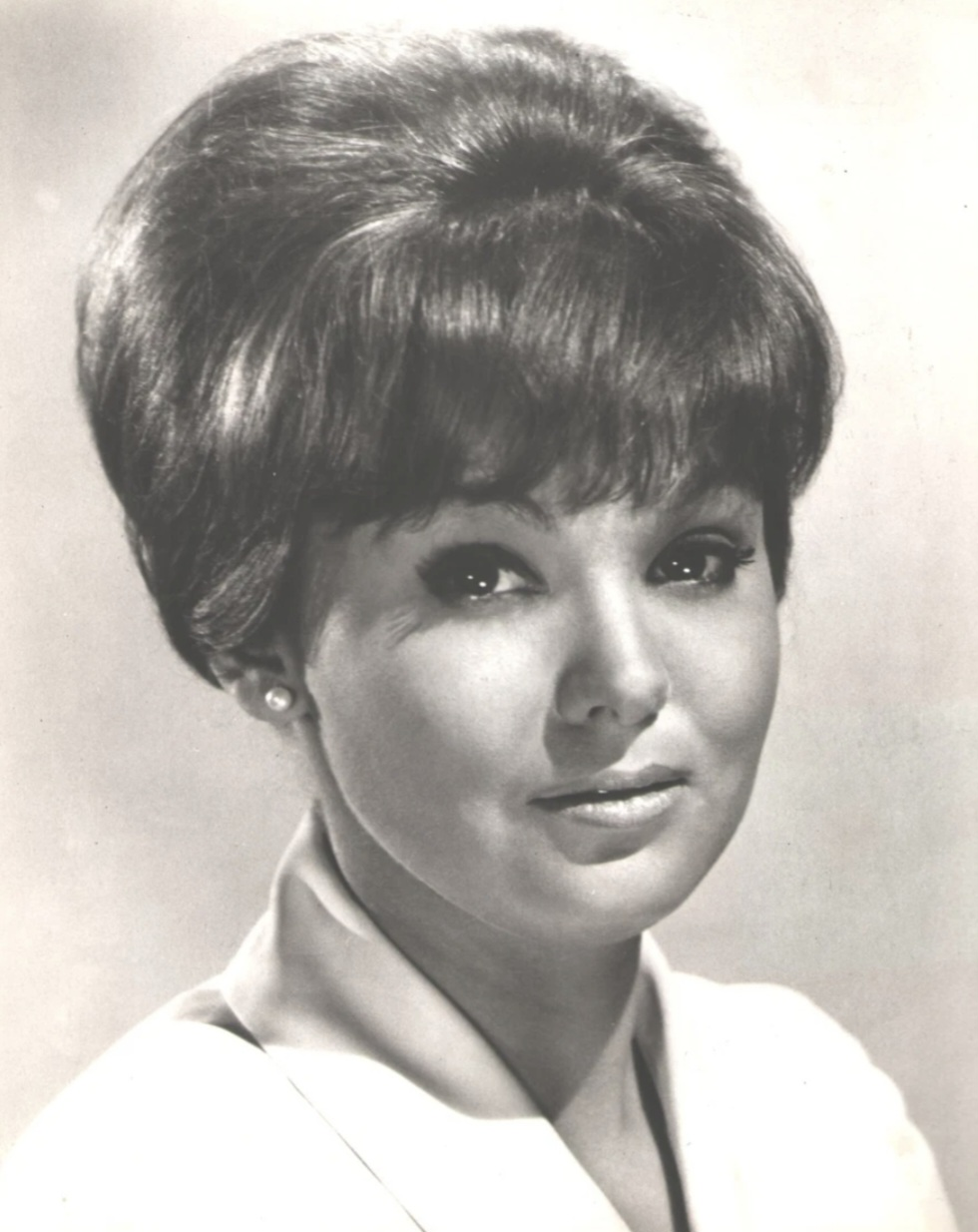
- Harris in 1974
- Born: Barbara Densmoor Harris; July 25, 1935; Evanston, Illinois, U.S.
- Died: August 21, 2018 (aged 83); Scottsdale, Arizona, U.S.
- Education: Wilbur Wright College
- Occupation: Actress
- Years active: 1959–1997
- Spouse: Paul Sills (m. 1955; div. 1958)

Barbara Densmoor Harris (July 25, 1935 – August 21, 2018) was an American actress. She won a Tony Award for Best Actress in a Musical for her performance in The Apple Tree (1966), and was nominated for an Academy Award for Best Supporting Actress for Who Is Harry Kellerman and Why Is He Saying Those Terrible Things About Me? (1971). She was also a four-time Golden Globe nominee.

== Early life ==
Harris was born in Evanston, Illinois, the daughter of Natalie (née Densmoor), a pianist, and Oscar Graham Harris, an arborist who later became a businessman. She was the youngest of four children. In her youth, Harris attended Senn High School and then Wilbur Wright College. She began her stage career as a teenager at the Playwrights Theatre in Chicago. Her fellow players included Edward Asner, Elaine May and Mike Nichols.

She was also a member of the Compass Players, the first ongoing improvisational theatre troupe in the United States, directed by Paul Sills, to whom she was married at that time. Though the Compass Players closed in disarray, a second theatre directed by Sills called The Second City opened in Chicago in 1959 and attracted national attention. Despite Sills and Harris having divorced by this time, Sills cast her in this company and brought her to New York to play in a Broadway edition at the Royale Theatre, opening on September 26, 1961. For her performance in this, she received her first Tony Award nomination.

== Broadway career ==
A life member of the Actors Studio, Harris received a Tony nomination in 1962 for Outstanding Featured Actress in a Musical for her Broadway debut in the original musical revue production From the Second City, which ran at the Royale Theatre from September 26, 1961 to December 9, 1961. The revue also featured the young Alan Arkin and Paul Sand. Produced by Max Liebman (among others) and directed by Paul Sills, the production presented Harris in such sketches as Caesar's Wife, First Affair, Museum Piece, and The Bergman Film.

In a 2002 interview with the Phoenix New Times, Harris recalled her ambivalence about even bringing the troupe to New York from Chicago. She said, "When I was at Second City, there was a vote about whether we should take our show to Broadway or not. Andrew Duncan and I voted no. I stayed in New York, but only because Richard Rodgers and Alan Jay Lerner came and said, 'We want to write a musical for you!' Well, I wasn't big on musical theater. I had seen part of South Pacific in Chicago and I walked out. But it was Richard Rodgers calling!"

While Rodgers and Lerner were busy working on their original musical for her, she won the Theatre World Award for her role in playwright Arthur Kopit's dark comedic farce, Oh Dad, Poor Dad, Mamma's Hung You in the Closet and I'm Feelin' So Sad. She earned a nomination for the 1966 Tony for Best Actress in a Musical for On a Clear Day You Can See Forever (1965), a Broadway musical created for her by Alan Jay Lerner and Burton Lane. She starred as Daisy Gamble, a New Yorker who seeks out the help of a psychiatrist to stop smoking. Under hypnosis, the apparently kooky, brash, and quirky character reveals unexpected hidden depths. During her hypnotic trances, she becomes fascinating to the psychiatrist as she reveals herself as a woman who has lived many past lives, one of them ending tragically. While critics were divided over the merits of the show, they praised Harris's performance. The show opened on October 14, 1965 at the Mark Hellinger Theatre and ran for 280 performances, earning a total of three Tony nominations. Harris performed numbers from the show with John Cullum on The Bell Telephone Hour ("The Lyrics of Alan Jay Lerner", broadcast on February 27, 1966). She had previously appeared on Broadway with Anne Bancroft in a 1963 production of Bertolt Brecht's Mother Courage and Her Children, staged by Jerome Robbins, at the Martin Beck Theater; the production received five Tony nominations.

Harris gave another well-received performance in The Apple Tree, another Broadway musical created for her, this time by the team of composer Jerry Bock and lyricist Sheldon Harnick. The show, in which Harris co-starred with Alan Alda and Larry Blyden and was directed by Mike Nichols, opened at the Shubert Theater on October 5, 1966 and closed on November 25, 1967. The show was based on three tales by Mark Twain, Frank R. Stockton, and Jules Feiffer and Harris starred in all three. She played Eve in Twain's The Diary of Adam and Eve, a melodramatically campy temptress in The Lady, or the Tiger?, and two roles in Jules Feiffer's Passionella. She was the forlorn, soot-stained nasal-congested chimney-sweep who wants only to be "a beautiful glamorous movie star, for its own sake", and, by virtue of an instantaneous costume-change, the huge-bosomed, gold-gowned, blonde bombshell of a movie star she always dreamed she'd be. Richard Watts Jr. of the New York Post wrote "[t]here are many high triumphs of the imagination in the vastly original musical comedy ... [b]ut it is Miss Harris who provides it with the extra touch of magic." Walter Kerr called her "the square root of noisy sex" and "sweetness carried well into infinity". Harris captured the 1967 Tony for Best Actress in a Musical as well as Cue Magazine's "Entertainer of the Year" award. Of her friend and colleague Mike Nichols, she said in 2002, "Mike Nichols was a toughie. He could be very kind, but if you weren't first-rate, watch out. He'd let you know."

After reading scripts for David Merrick, Harris directed a Broadway production of The Penny Wars by Elliott Baker in 1969 starring Kim Hunter, George Voskovec, and Kristoffer Tabori. She stopped appearing on stage after The Apple Tree, except for the off-Broadway first American production of Brecht and Weill's Mahagonny in 1970, in which she played the role of Jenny, originally created by Lotte Lenya. In the 2002 interview, Harris said, "Who wants to be up on the stage all the time? It isn't easy. You have to be awfully invested in the fame aspect, and I really never was. What I cared about was the discipline of acting, whether I did well or not."

== Hollywood career ==
=== Early film and television work ===
From 1961 through 1964, she appeared as a guest star on such popular television series as Alfred Hitchcock Presents, Naked City, Channing and The Defenders. In 1965, she made an auspicious feature film debut as social worker Sandra Markowitz in the screen version of A Thousand Clowns. She co-starred opposite Jason Robards Jr., who played the freewheeling, eternally optimistic guardian of his teenage nephew, the custody of whom is threatened by authorities' dim view of his bohemian lifestyle. The New York Times critic wrote on December 9, 1965 that the movie "has the new and sensational Barbara Harris playing the appropriately light-headed girl". Harris and Robards won Golden Globe Award nominations. She then appeared in the screen version of Arthur Kopit's darkly comic Oh Dad, Poor Dad, Mamma's Hung You in the Closet and I'm Feelin' So Sad (1967) with Rosalind Russell as the monstrous mother of Robert Morse who takes the stuffed corpse of her dead husband along on trips. Reviewing the latter film for The New York Times on February 16, 1967, critic Bosley Crowther wrote, "Barbara Harris from the original play cast is as wacky as she was on the stage — casual and direct and totally blasé about the boisterous business of sex. Her tussle to accomplish her purpose, with the corpse falling out into the room every time she is about to score a field goal, is still the funniest scene."

In Neil Simon's Plaza Suite (1971) with Walter Matthau, the British entertainment magazine Time Out called the "delightful" Harris' gifts "wasted". She had only slightly better opportunities in The War Between Men and Women (1972) with Jack Lemmon.

She earned an Oscar nomination for the 1971 film (which co-starred Dustin Hoffman) Who Is Harry Kellerman and Why Is He Saying Those Terrible Things About Me?, about a rich, successful, womanizing pop songwriter suffering a debilitating but oddly liberating mental crisis. The script was by Herb Gardner, who also wrote A Thousand Clowns.

=== Harris and two master directors ===
In 1975, Harris appeared in one of her signature film roles in Robert Altman's masterpiece Nashville, playing Winifred Albuquerque, a ditzy, scantily clad country singing hopeful who may be far more opportunistic and calculating than she would first appear. Accounts of the film's chaotic and inspired production, particularly in Jan Stuart's book The Nashville Chronicles: The Making of Robert Altman's Masterpiece, indicate a clash between actress and director. Harris earned a Golden Globe nomination (one of 11 for the film--an all-time Golden Globes record); as Oscar-nominated co-star Lily Tomlin put it, "I was the hugest of Barbara Harris fans; I thought she was so stunning and original." Although the two were set to reunite with Altman in a sequel, that film was never made.

The following year, Alfred Hitchcock cast her in Family Plot as a bogus spiritualist who searches for a missing heir and a family fortune with her cab driver boyfriend. Among a cast that includes Bruce Dern, Karen Black and William Devane, Hitchcock was particularly delighted by Harris' quirkiness, skill and intelligence. She received praise from critics and earned a Golden Globe nomination for the film, which was based on the novel The Rainbird Pattern by Victor Canning, and which marked a reunion of Hitchcock with Ernest Lehman, who had created the original screenplay for North by Northwest. In her 2002 Phoenix New Times interview, she admitted that she "turned down Alfred Hitchcock when he first asked me to be in one of his movies". After agreeing to star in Family Plot, she recalled that "Hitchcock was a wonderful man." The film was Hitchcock's last and inasmuch as Harris appears by herself in its final shot (in which she winks at the audience), she has the distinction of being the actor who, so to speak, ended Alfred Hitchcock's long and illustrious career.

=== Later career and retirement ===
Harris continued to appear in films of the 1970s-80s, including another Golden Globe-nominated turn, in Freaky Friday (1976) with a young Jodie Foster, Movie Movie for director Stanley Donen, and The North Avenue Irregulars (1979) with Edward Herrmann and Cloris Leachman. She co-starred in The Seduction of Joe Tynan (1979) with one of her former Broadway leading men, Alan Alda (who also wrote the screenplay), a tale of a liberal Washington Senator caught in an affair with a younger woman, played by Meryl Streep.

In 1981, she starred in Second-Hand Hearts for esteemed director Hal Ashby as "Dinette Dusty", a recently widowed waitress and would-be singer who marries a boozy carwash worker named "Loyal", played by Robert Blake, to get back her children from their paternal grandparents. The film, based on a highly sought-after "road movie" screenplay by Charles K. Eastman, was a critical and box office disaster that tarnished the careers of all concerned. Critic Vincent Canby in his negative The New York Times review on May 8, 1981 opined, "[t]he film's one bright spot is Barbara Harris, who plays Dinette as sincerely as possible under awful conditions. She looks great even when she's supposed to be tacky, and is genuinely funny as she tries to make sense out of Loyal's muddled philosophizing, which, of course, the screenplay requires her to match." Harris was offscreen until 1986 when she played the mother of Kathleen Turner in Peggy Sue Got Married. Her last films were Dirty Rotten Scoundrels (1988) and Grosse Pointe Blank (1997).

Harris retired from acting and began teaching. When asked in 2002 if she would resume her acting career, she said, "Well, if someone handed me something fantastic for $10 million, I'd work again. But I haven't worked in a long time as an actor. I don't miss it. I think the only thing that drew me to acting in the first place was the group of people I was working with: Ed Asner, Paul Sills, Mike Nichols, Elaine May. And all I really wanted to do back then was rehearsal. I was in it for the process, and I really resented having to go out and do a performance for an audience, because the process stopped; it had to freeze and be the same every night. It wasn't as interesting."

In 2005, she briefly resurfaced, guest starring as The Queen and as Spunky Brandburn on Anne Manx on Amazonia, an audio drama by the Radio Repertory Company of America, which aired on XM Satellite Radio.

== Death ==
Harris died of lung cancer in Scottsdale, Arizona, on August 21, 2018, aged 83. She is buried at Markesan Memorial Cemetery in Markesan, Wisconsin, where her mother and grandparents are buried.

== Filmography ==
Year	Title	Role	Notes
1965	A Thousand Clowns	Dr. Sandra Markowitz	Nominated—Golden Globe Award for Best Actress in a Motion Picture – Musical or Comedy
1967	Oh Dad, Poor Dad, Mamma's Hung You in the Closet and I'm Feelin' So Sad	Rosalie	
1971	Plaza Suite	Muriel Tate	
1971	Who Is Harry Kellerman and Why Is He Saying Those Terrible Things About Me?	Allison Densmore	Nominated—Academy Award for Best Supporting Actress
1972	The War Between Men and Women	Theresa Alice Kozlenko	
1974	Mixed Company	Kathy Morrison	
1975	The Manchu Eagle Murder Caper Mystery	Miss Helen Fredericks	
1975	Nashville	Winifred/Albuquerque	Nominated—Golden Globe Award for Best Supporting Actress – Motion Picture
1976	Family Plot	Blanche Tyler	Nominated—Golden Globe Award for Best Actress in a Motion Picture – Musical or Comedy
1976	Freaky Friday	Ellen Andrews	Nominated—Golden Globe Award for Best Actress in a Motion Picture – Musical or Comedy
1978	Movie Movie	Trixie Lane	Segment: Baxter's Beauties of 1933
1979	The North Avenue Irregulars	Vickie Simms	
1979	The Seduction of Joe Tynan	Ellie Tynan	
1981	Second-Hand Hearts	Dinette Dusty	
1986	Peggy Sue Got Married	Evelyn Kelcher	
1987	Nice Girls Don't Explode	Mom	
1988	Dirty Rotten Scoundrels	Fanny Eubanks	
1997	Grosse Pointe Blank	Mary Blank	Final Film Role

== Television ==
Year	Title	Role	Notes
1961	Alfred Hitchcock Presents	Beth	Season 7 Episode 6: "Beta Delta Gamma"
1962	As Caesar Sees It	Self	TV comedy featuring insights of Sid Caesar
1962	Naked City	Helga Royd	Season 4 Episode 3: "Daughter Am I in My Father's House"
1963	Chronicle		Episode: "The French, They Are So French"
1963	Channing	Sophie Kannakos	Season 1 Episode 4: "No Wild Games for Sophie"
1963	What's Going on Here?		WNEW-produced TV comedy film
1964	The Defenders	Margit Wolsung	Season 3 Episode 14: "Claire Cheval Died in Boston"
1964	The Doctors and the Nurses	Anna Faye	Season 2 Episode 31: "White on White"
1964	The Doctors and the Nurses	Elaine Radnitz	Season 3 Episode 10: "So Some Girls Play the Cello"
1964	The Garry Moore Show	Self	
1964	The Jack Paar Show	Self	
1966	The Bell Telephone Hour	Self - singer	"The Lyrics of Alan Jay Lerner" w/Florence Henderson, Edward Villella, Patricia McBride, John Cullum and Stanley Holloway
1967	The Merv Griffin Show	Self	
1971	Stand Up and Cheer	Self	
1977	A Doonesbury Special	Joanie Caucus	Voice only (animated)
1989	Days of Our Lives	Susan Faraday	5 episodes (Season 1 Episodes 16, 17, 19, 21, 22)
1992	Middle Ages	Jean	Season 1 Episode 4: "Night Moves"

== Theater ==
Year	Title	Role	Notes
1961	From the Second City		Broadway debut Nominated—Tony Award for Best Supporting or Featured Actress in a Musical
1962	Oh Dad, Poor Dad, Mamma's Hung You in the Closet and I'm Feelin' So Sad	Rosalie	Obie Award for Distinguished Performance by an Actress
1963	Mother Courage and Her Children	Yvette Pottier	
1965	On a Clear Day You Can See Forever	Daisy Gamble	Nominated—Tony Award for Best Leading Actress in a Musical
1966	The Apple Tree	Eve - The Diary of Adam and Eve; Passionella - Passionella; Princess Barbara - The Lady, or the Tiger?	Tony Award for Best Leading Actress in a Musical
1970	Mahagonny	Jenny	Off-Broadway production
