= Fountain Inn =

Fountain Inn may refer to:

- Fountain Inn, South Carolina, a town in Greenville and Laurens Counties, South Carolina, United States
- Fountain Inn, Ashurst, a 16th-century public house in West Sussex, England
- Fountain Inn (novel), a 1939 mystery novel by Victor Canning
