= Young Doctor Galahad =

1938 novel by Elizabeth Seifert

- Author: Elizabeth Seifert
- Language: English
- Genre: Novel
- Publisher: Dodd, Mead & Company
- Publication date: 1938
- Publication place: United States
- Media type: Print (hardcover)

Young Doctor Galahad is a 1938 novel by American author Elizabeth Seifert. The novel was Seifert's debut work of fiction and immediately garnered critical acclaim, winning a $10,000 prize from Redbook magazine and Dodd, Mead & Company.

While Young Doctor Galahad was Seifert's first published novel, she had been writing since the age of 10. At the time of the book's publication, Seifert was 40 years old and the mother of four children.

== Background ==
In 1937, Seifert's husband was declared totally disabled due to war injuries, and with four teenage children to support, Seifert began writing more seriously in her spare time to supplement the family's income. That year, she completed her first manuscript, Young Doctor Galahad. Seifert sent the manuscript to her sister, Shirley Seifert, a writer of historical fiction, who forwarded it to her publisher. Her publisher recognized it as an exceptional first novel and helped Seifert enter it in a contest held by Dodd, Mead & Co., and sponsored by Redbook, where it won a $10,000 (roughly US$223,958 today) award. The book, published the following year, was originally priced at US$2.50 (roughly US$57 today).

== Plot summary ==
The novel centers on Dr. Anthony "Tony" McNeill, a young Canadian doctor who leaves his home country to take a position at the private Westwood Hospital in the small Missouri town of Darcey. Despite his idealistic commitment to providing excellent medical care, Tony quickly finds himself at odds with the more commercially minded local doctors who prioritize profits over patients.

Tony's crusade to reform the medical system and make quality care available to all earns him the nickname “Galahad” from his cynical peers. He becomes embroiled in battles against unethical practices, including an illegal abortion ring operated by a local midwife. Tony also joins the state health department's efforts to establish a free community health clinic, further antagonizing the town's conservative medical establishment.

Reviews of the novel commented on the plot's illustration of the “vicious circle” that often forces doctors to prioritize financial concerns over patient welfare.

== Critical reception ==
Reviews of the novel were generally positive. The Vancouver Sun called the novel "good fiction" that “has all the ingredients of a good novel.” The reviewer acknowledged that the story “tends a little towards melodrama, perhaps, and exaggerates extremes” at times. However, they commended Seifert's character development, noting that “even the bad eggs of the drama enlist a certain amount of sympathy.”

In a review for the Montreal Gazette, the novel was favorably compared to A. J. Cronin's acclaimed work The Citadel, both of which exposed the “ills of the flesh” and “nasty skeletons” lurking within the medical profession. The Gazette review called the book “enthralling”.

The Youngstown Vindicator hailed Young Doctor Galahad as “noteworthy both as a novel and as evidence of the growing sentiment in this country in favor of socialized medicine, or at least in favor of more public health insurance and less commercialism in medical practice.” The reviewer saw Seifert as a “moderate believer in socialized medicine” who advocated for reform through cooperative initiatives rather than centralized bureaucracy.

== Bibliography ==
- Dains, Mary K. "Seifert, Elizabeth (1897-1983), novelist.” American National Biography. 1 Feb. 2000; Accessed 27 Apr. 2024.
