= Vincent Beck =

American actor (1924–1984)

- Vincent Beck in The Wild, Wild West 1968
- Born: August 15, 1924; Manhattan, New York City, New York, U.S.
- Died: July 24, 1984 (aged 59); Manhattan, New York City, New York, U.S
- Occupation: Actor
- Years active: 1946–1982

Vincent Beck (August 15, 1924 – July 24, 1984) was an American character actor who began his career as on stage. He was also a prolific film and television actor who acted in films such as Santa Claus Conquers the Martians (1964), The Spy in the Green Hat (1967), The Scorpio Letters (1967), The Pink Jungle (1968), The Bamboo Saucer (1968) and Vigilante (1983). He also appeared in numerous television shows including The Monkees, Get Smart, Daniel Boone, The Man from U.N.C.L.E., Bonanza, The Time Tunnel, and Lost in Space.

== Background ==
A prolific actor, he became recognized for his roles on film early in his career. A portion of the television roles in his career consisted of villains, aliens and other interesting characters. From 1982, he was third vice president of Actors Equity. He was also president of the New York branch of the Screen Actors Guild, having held that position since 1983.

== Stage ==
In 1946, he appeared on Broadway in A Flag Is Born on Broadway which marked his stage debut. Other stage roles included The World of Sholom Aleichem, The Merchant of Venice, Oliver, Irma la Douce, Gypsy and Bells Are Ringing.

In 1950, Beck was appearing as The Young Covey in the Sean O'Casey play, The Plough and the Stars which had been playing at the Hudson Guild Theater since Jan 30th. Along with Sy Travers and Osna Palmer, Beck was noted by The Billboard reviewer Dennis McDonald for his fine performance. In April, he appeared in James Barrie's Peter Pan which had been playing at the Imperial Theater in New York since the 24th of that month. Beck was playing the part of Whibbles. In April 1951, he was playing the part of Teddy in the Clifford Odets comedy, Night Music, which had been playing at the ANTA Playhouse. Rod Steiger was also in the play.

In 1955, he appeared in the musical, Almost Crazy, which played at the Longacre Theater from June 20, 1955 to July 2.

In early 1965, Beck was playing the part of the evil Bill Sikes in the stage production Oliver. The reviewer in The Des Moines Register said he was "properly menacing as the all-time bad guy Sikes".

== Film and television career ==
=== 1960s ===
Beck's earliest film role was that of the evil Martian leader Voldar in the 1964 film Santa Claus Conquers the Martians which was directed by Nicholas Webster. In 1965 he appeared on Gilligan's Island (S2/EP9 - as Russian cosmonaut Igor), in the Anybody Got a Zebra? episode of Mister Ed as Krona. He played the part of Benjamin Luger in The Man from U.N.C.L.E. film The Spy in the Green Hat which was released in 1967. He played the part of Zagorsky in the Frank Telford directed sci-fi film The Bamboo Saucer which was released in 1968.

=== 1970s to 1980s ===
Beck appeared as Kevin Archer in an episode of Mannix in which Joe Mannix is targeted by a crime boss who thinks he knows too much about a missing corpse. The episode aired on January 30, 1971. Later that year Beck appeared in another episode of Mannix as Frankie West in Catspaw. The following year, he was in Mission Impossible as Bolt in the Double Dead episode which aired on 12 February 1972. The following year he was in The Magician, a series that starred Bill Bixby. The episode he appeared in was The Manhunters in which played the part of Stanley Owens. It aired on October 2, 1973. He appeared in The F.B.I. in the Deadly Ambition episode which aired in 1974 and another episode of Mannix, Hardball which aired the following year in 1975. He played the part of Trilling in the Michael Winner directed 1979 film, Firepower which starred Sophia Loren and James Coburn.

His last acting role was that of the corrupt Judge Sinclair in the William Lustig directed Vigilante, a film about an average man who becomes a vigilante after his wife and young son are murdered by a street gang. It also starred Fred Williamson, Robert Forster, Joe Spinell and Woody Strode. It was released in 1983. Judge Sinclair obviously got a share in the bribe-money which lawyer Einsberg (played by Joe Spinell) received from the gang and the killers basically walk free. Lustig later recalled that, as a representative of Screen Actors Guild, Beck «made his life miserable» on set by checking him up for rules and regulations and that Lustig used to «curse his name every day».

== Death ==
Beck died at age 59 of cancer at his Manhattan home in July 1984.

== Filmography ==
Film
Title	Year	Role	Director	Notes #
Santa Claus Conquers the Martians	1964	Voldar	Nicholas Webster	
The Spy in the Green Hat	1967	Benjamin Luger	Joseph Sargent	
The Scorpio Letters	1967	Paul Fretoni	Richard Thorpe	TV movie
Don't Just Stand There	1968	Painter	Ron Winston	
The Pink Jungle	1968	Sanchez	Delbert Mann	
The Bamboo Saucer	1968	Zagorsky	Frank Telford	Filmed in 1966
Firepower	1979	Trilling	Michael Winner	
...And Justice for All.	1979	Officer Leary	Norman Jewison	
Vigilante	1983	Judge Sinclair	William Lustig	(final film role)

Television 1960s
Title	Episode #	Role	Director	Year	Notes #
Mister Ed	Anybody Got a Zebra?	Krona	Arthur Lubin	1965	Aired 17 October 1965
Gilligan's Island	Nyet, Nyet, Not Yet	Igor	Jack Arnold	1965	Aired 18 November 1965
Get Smart	My Nephew the Spy	Salesman	Bruce Bilson	1965	Aired 4 December 1965
Gunsmoke	Outlaw's Woman	Coley Martin	Mark Rydell	1965	Aired 11 December 1965
Honey West	Rockabye the Hard Way	John raven	Bill Colleran	1965	Aired 24 December 1965
Daniel Boone	Gabriel	Gabriel	Gerd Oswald	1966	Aired 6 January 1966
The Man from U.N.C.L.E.	The Birds and the Bees Affair	Vince Maples	Alvin Ganzer	1966	Aired 21 January 1966
The Girl from U.N.C.L.E.	The Prisoner of Zalamar Affair	Kassim	Herschel Daugherty	1966	Aired 20 September 1966
Bonanza	The Pursued: Part 1	Grant Carbo	William Witney	1966	Aired 2 October 1966
Bonanza	The Pursued: Part 2	Grant Carbo	William Witney	1966	Aired 9 October 1966
The Man from U.N.C.L.E.	The Concrete Overcoat Affair: Part I	Luger	Joseph Sargent	1966	Aired 25 November 1966
T.H.E. Cat	King of Limpets	Vasco	Boris Sagal	1966	Aired 9 December 1966
The Monkees	Royal Flush	Sigmund	James Frawley	1966	Aired 12 September 1966
The Monkees	S1:E16, Son of a Gypsy	Marco	James Frawley	1966	Aired 26 December 1966
Iron Horse	Hellcat	Lanker	Samuel Fuller	1966	Aired 26 December 1966
The Time Tunnel	Merlin the Magician	Wogan	Harry Harris	1967	Aired 17 March 1967
The Time Tunnel	Town of Terror	Alien Leader	Herschel Daugherty	1967	Aired 7 April 1967
Lost in Space	Hunter's Moon	Megazor	Don Richardson	1967	Aired 27 September 1967
The Monkees	S2:E9, The Card Carrying Red Shoes	Ivan	James Frawley	1967	Aired 6 November 1967
Adam-12	Log 11: It's Just a Little Dent, Isn't It?	Joe Claver	Hollingsworth Morse	1968	Ared 5 October 1968
The Wild Wild West	The Night of the Pelican	Corporal Simon	Alex Nicol	1968	Aired 27 December 1968
The Immortal	Pilot	Locke	Joseph Sargent	1969	Aired 30 September 1969

Television 1970s
Title	Episode #	Role	Director	Year	Notes #
The F.B.I.	The Dealer	Frank Brokaw	Jesse Hibbs	1970	Aired 22 February 1970
Mannix	The Crime That Wasn't	Kevin Archer	Barry Crane	1971	Aired 30 January 1971
Alias Smith and Jones	The Great Shell Game	Steward	Richard Benedict	1971	Aired 18 February 1971
Ironside	The Summer Soldier	Bedros Demirjian	Don Weis	1971	Aired 4 March 1971
Mannix	Catspaw	Frankie West	Harry Harvey Jr.	1971	Aired 8 December 1971
Mission: Impossible	Double Dead	Bolt	Barry Crane	1972	Aired 12 February 1972
Banyon	A Date with Death	Floyd Vender	Charles S. Dubin	1972	Aired 24 November 1972
The Magician	The Manhunters	Stanley Owens	Sutton Roley	1973	Aired 2 October 1973
Medical Center	The Torn Man	Lewie Tappie	Vincent Sherman	1972	Aired 11 October 1972
Medical Center	Woman for Hire	Jerry Sanders	Vincent Sherman	1973	Aired 19 November 1973
The F.B.I.	Deadly Ambition	Fisher	Don Medford	1974	Aired 17 March 1974
McMillan & Wife	Love, Honor and Swindle	Dan Hagstrom	Lou Antonio	1975	Aired 16 February 1975
Medical Center	Aftershock	Winchell	Joseph Pevney	1975	Aired 10 March 1975
Mannix	Hardball	Frank Sartino	Bill Bixby	1975	Aired 13 April 1975
The Invisible Man	The Fine Art of Diplomacy	Gregario	Sigmund Neufeld Jr.	1975	Aired 15 September 1975
Petrocelli	Mark of Cain	Parker	Leonard Katzman	1975	Aired 17 September 1975
