= The Melting Man =

1968 novel

- First edition
- Author: Victor Canning
- Language: English
- Series: Rex Carver
- Genre: Spy thriller
- Publisher: Heinemann
- Publication date: 1968
- Publication place: United Kingdom
- Media type: Print
- Preceded by: The Python Project

The Melting Man is a 1968 thriller novel by the British Victor Canning. It is the fourth and final entry in a series novels about Rex Carver, a private detective drawn back into his old profession of espionage. It features the French secret agent Aristide de la Dole, who had previously appeared in Doubled in Diamonds.

== Synopsis ==
Carver is hired by the millionaire Cavan O’Dowda to recover his missing Mercedes which has disappeared somewhere between Evian and Cannes with crucial documents inside.

== Bibliography ==
- Burton, Alan. Historical Dictionary of British Spy Fiction. Rowman & Littlefield, 2016.
- Murphy, Bruce F. The Encyclopedia of Murder and Mystery. Springer, 1999.
- Reilly, John M. Twentieth Century Crime & Mystery Writers. Springer, 2015.
