= Queen's Pawn (novel) =

1969 novel

- First edition
- Author: Victor Canning
- Language: English
- Genre: Thriller
- Publisher: Heinemann
- Publication date: 1969
- Publication place: United Kingdom
- Media type: Print

Queen's Pawn is a 1969 thriller novel by the British writer Victor Canning. The title is a reference to the chess opening of the same name and the fact that much of the novel's action centres around the Queen Elizabeth 2 ocean liner. It was his first novel after finishing the Rex Carver series of spy adventures.

== Synopsis ==
Andrew Raikes, a confidence trickster, is trying to raise enough money to reclaim his family's ancestral home, which had been lost by his father's mismanagement. Barely two months after achieving this, he and his erstwhile partner are blackmailed into taking part in a heist on a cruise liner, and make great efforts to identify and eliminate the blackmailer.

== Bibliography ==
- Murphy, Bruce F. The Encyclopedia of Murder and Mystery. Springer, 1999.
- Reilly, John M. Twentieth Century Crime & Mystery Writers. Springer, 2015.
