= Family Plot =

1976 film by Alfred Hitchcock

- Theatrical release poster
- Directed by: Alfred Hitchcock
- Written by: Ernest Lehman
- Based on: The Rainbird Pattern by Victor Canning
- Produced by: Alfred Hitchcock
- Starring: Karen Black; Bruce Dern; Barbara Harris; William Devane
- Cinematography: Leonard J. South
- Edited by: J. Terry Williams
- Music by: John Williams
- Distributed by: Universal Pictures
- Release date: April 9, 1976
- Running time: 120 minutes
- Country: United States
- Language: English
- Budget: $4.5 million
- Box office: $13 million

Family Plot is a 1976 American black comedy thriller film directed by Alfred Hitchcock in his final directorial feature, and starring Karen Black, Bruce Dern, Barbara Harris, and William Devane. It was based on Victor Canning's 1972 novel The Rainbird Pattern, which Ernest Lehman adapted for the screen.

The film was screened at the 1976 Cannes Film Festival but was not entered into the main competition.

== Plot ==
Fake psychic Blanche Tyler and her boyfriend, George Lumley, attempt to locate the nephew of wealthy, guilt-ridden, elderly Julia Rainbird. Julia's deceased sister gave the baby boy up for adoption, but Julia now wants to make him her heir and will pay Blanche $10,000 to find him. Julia knows almost nothing about the infant. During his investigation George discovers that the boy was given the name Edward Shoebridge and is thought to have died while still young. However, George tracks down a man, Joseph Maloney, who paid for Edward's tombstone years after his supposed death, and discovers the grave is empty. George and Blanche bicker frequently.

Meanwhile, Arthur Adamson and his live-in girlfriend Fran kidnap millionaires and dignitaries, confining them in a secure room in the cellar of their home, and return them in exchange for ransoms in the form of valuable diamonds. Arthur conceals the latest diamond "where everyone can see it," within a crystal chandelier hanging above the home's main staircase.

When Arthur learns that George is investigating him, he enlists Maloney (the two had murdered Arthur's adoptive parents long ago) to kill Blanche and George. Maloney contacts Blanche and George, telling them to meet him at a café on a mountain road. There, he cuts the brakeline of Blanche's car, but they manage to survive their dangerous high-speed descent. Maloney then tries to run them over, but dies in a fiery explosion when he swerves to avoid an oncoming car and drives over the edge.

At Maloney's funeral, his wife tearfully confesses, under pressure of George's questioning, that Shoebridge's name is now Arthur Adamson. George must go to work driving his taxi for an evening shift, so Blanche tracks down various A. Adamsons in San Francisco, eventually reaching the jewelry store that Arthur Adamson owns as it closes for the day. Arthur's assistant Mrs. Clay offers to let Blanche leave a note. Blanche tricks Mrs. Clay into giving her Arthur's home address.

Arthur and Fran are bundling their latest kidnap victim, Bishop Wood, into their car when Blanche rings their doorbell. They attempt to drive out of their garage, but Blanche's car blocks their way. Blanche tells Arthur that his aunt wants to make him her heir. Then Blanche sees the unconscious bishop, and she is abducted by the couple. Arthur drugs her and leaves her in the cellar, planning to deal with her after they exchange the bishop for ransom.

Searching for Blanche, George finds her car outside Arthur and Fran's house. When no one answers the door, he breaks in and searches for her. He finds her handbag with blood stains on it and indications of a struggle. When Arthur and Fran return home, George hides upstairs. He overhears Arthur telling Fran about his plan to kill Blanche and make her death seem like a suicide. George manages to talk to Blanche, who is faking unconsciousness in the cellar's hidden room (left open by Arthur when he went to check on her). Arthur and Fran enter to carry Blanche out to the car, but she knocks them down and runs out, and George locks the kidnappers in.

Blanche then goes into what appears to be a genuine trance. She walks out of the basement, climbs halfway up the main staircase, stops, and points at the huge diamond hidden in the chandelier. Blanche then "wakes" and asks George what she is doing there. He excitedly tells her that she is indeed a real psychic. He calls the police to collect the reward for capturing the kidnappers and finding the jewels. A smiling Blanche winks at the camera.

== Cast ==
- Karen Black as Fran
- Bruce Dern as George Lumley
- Barbara Harris as Blanche Tyler
- William Devane as Arthur Adamson/Edward Shoebridge
- Cathleen Nesbitt as Julia Rainbird
- Ed Lauter as Joseph P. Maloney
- Katherine Helmond as Mrs. Maloney
- Warren J. Kemmerling as Grandison
- Nicholas Colasanto as Victor Constantine
- Edith Atwater as Mrs. Clay
- William Prince as Bishop Wood
- Marge Redmond as Vera Hannagan
- John Lehne as Andy Bush
- Charles Tyner as Wheeler
- Alexander Lockwood as Parson
- Martin West as Sanger
- Elisabeth Brooks as Woman in cafe with priest
- Carl Byrd as Lieutenant Peterson (Uncredited)

== Production ==
In 1973, Alfred Hitchcock's wife Alma Reville encouraged him to read a selection of novels chosen by his personal assistant Peggy Robertson. Hitchcock read Victor Canning's 1972 novel The Rainbird Pattern and assigned Anthony Shaffer to adapt it into a screenplay. Shaffer, who had also read the novel, commented, "I thought it had possibilities but I wasn't eager for the sort of version that Hitch was describing — a sort of light, Noël Coward–Madame Arcati thing with Margaret Rutherford." Shaffer agreed to think about the project before he left for a vacation in France. A week later, Hitchcock phoned Shaffer to state his agent had made excessive demands, including a percentage of the box office gross. According to Shaffer, he fervently denied any such matter was discussed. Regardless, Hitchcock canceled their collaboration and moved on with Ernest Lehman.

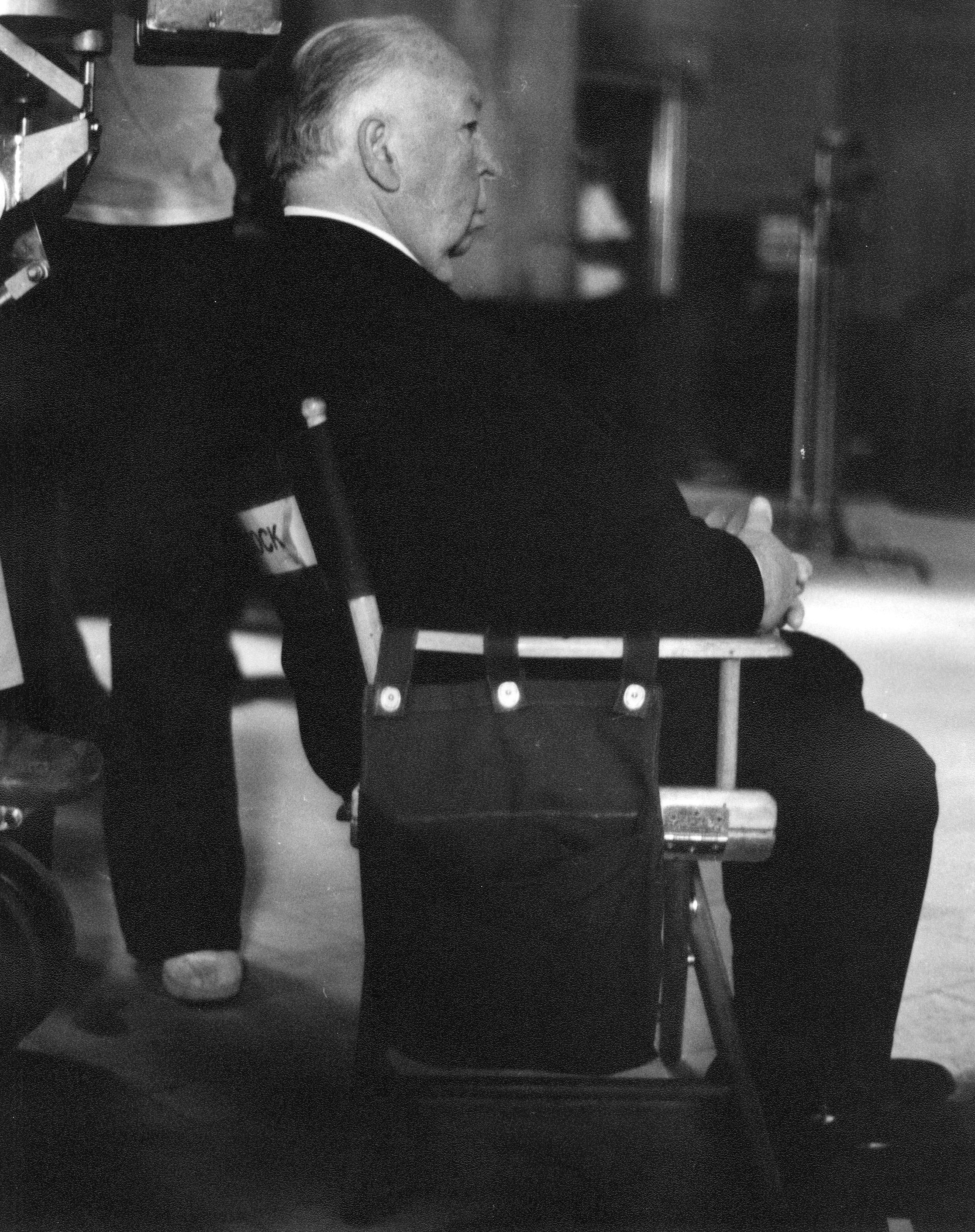
Hitchcock at work on location in San Francisco for Family Plot

Although Lehman had previously declined the offer, by November 1973, he had been persuaded to do the adaptation again. He observed that Hitchcock had "none of his former stamina, and I found that I had far less inclination, in the beginning of our story conferences, to do creative battle with this legendary and physically weakened man." By April 1974, Lehman submitted a first draft of the screenplay, tentatively titled Deception. Afterwards, the working title was changed to Deceit. Within a week, Hitchcock sent back the script with his annotated queries and suggestions. Hitchcock further outlined the opening shot of the film and suggested revisions for the characters' motivations and plot construction.

Filming began on May 12, 1975. However, Hitchcock decided to deliberately leave the story's location unspecific. He told his first assistant director Howard Kazanjian that he wanted all the road signs and references to northern California removed.

Before the film's production, Hitchcock had suffered a heart attack in September 1974 and was rushed to the UCLA Medical Center. There, he had a pacemaker inserted under the skin of his shoulder bone. By July 1975, with only a few weeks of filming left, Hitchcock was physically exhausted and anxious. One day, he halted further filming after four o'clock PST and to stay on schedule and within budget, Hitchcock simplified certain scenes and sacrificed clarity for the sake of speed.

That same month, the film's final title had not been decided. A person within Universal's publicity department suggested the title Family Plot. Hitchcock was not entirely pleased but could not think of an alternative, and agreed to the final title. Variety reported that the film's new title on July 16.

Hitchcock's signature cameo in Family Plot can be seen 40 minutes into the film. He appears in silhouette through the glass door of the Registrar of Births and Deaths.

=== Casting ===
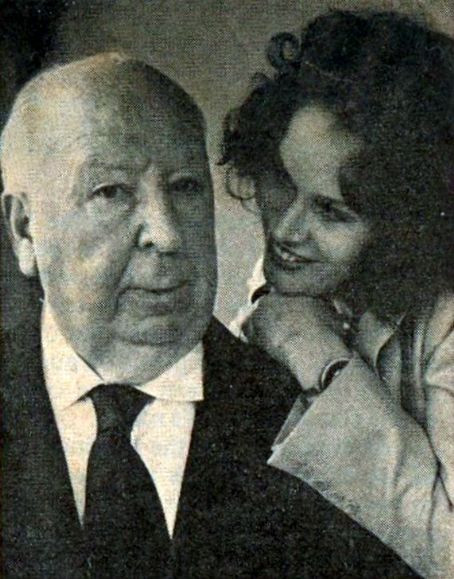
Alfred Hitchcock and Karen Black

Hitchcock considered Jack Nicholson among several actors for George Lumbley after he had seen Easy Rider (1969), but Nicholson was not available as he was preparing for One Flew Over the Cuckoo's Nest (1975). Hitchcock decided to cast Bruce Dern, who had co-starred with Nicholson on The King of Marvin Gardens (1972). Dern had previously starred in several episodes of Alfred Hitchcock Presents and in Marnie (1964), in which he had a brief role in a flashback playing a doomed sailor.

Cybill Shepherd wrote in her memoir that she had hoped to play the part of Fran, which eventually went to Karen Black. Black met with Hitchcock in February 1975, and he immediately decided to cast her.

Universal Pictures suggested Liza Minnelli for the part of Blanche Tyler, but Hitchcock was not interested and felt her salary would be too expensive. Instead, Hitchcock cast Barbara Harris after he had watched A Thousand Clowns (1965). Although Lillian Gish offered to do a screen test, Hitchcock decided to cast Cathleen Nesbitt as Julia Rainbird.

A month into filming, Roy Thinnes had been cast as Adamson but Hitchcock was unhappy with his performance, so he was fired and replaced by William Devane.

=== Music ===
For the score, Universal's music executive, Harry Garfield, recommended John Williams to Hitchcock, following the Oscar and critical acclaim of his music score for Jaws.

The film was the only Hitchcock production to be scored by Williams, who has stated that Hitchcock wanted choir voices for Madame Blanche to make her seem psychic towards the beginning, and that Hitchcock was at the scoring sessions most of the time and would often give him suggestions. For the scene in which Maloney suddenly disappears from Adamson's office, Hitchcock suggested that Williams stop the music when the camera cuts to the open window to indicate to the audience that Maloney has left through it. Hitchcock then went on to say, "Mr. Williams, murder can be fun", when he suggested that he should conduct the music lightly for a darker scene of the film. Williams stated that it was a great privilege, and that he had a wonderful working experience with the director.

The complete soundtrack was not released upon the film's release date. Few themes from the film were released on John Williams and Alfred Hitchcock compilation albums. For years afterwards, the original soundtrack was not available, spawning many bootleg copies of the complete scoring sessions of the film over the internet. Finally in 2010, Varèse Sarabande officially released a limited edition of the complete Original Motion Picture Soundtrack, 34 years after the film's initial release.

Original Motion Picture Soundtrack
| No. | Title | Length |
|---|---|---|
| 1. | "The First Séance" | 5:29 |
| 2. | "Blanche's Challenge" | 2:09 |
| 3. | "The Mystery Woman" | 3:27 |
| 4. | "The Rescue of Constantine / The Diamond Chandelier" | 2:21 |
| 5. | "Kitchen Pranks" | 2:08 |
| 6. | "The Shoebridge Headstone" | 2:23 |
| 7. | "Maloney's Visit to the Jewelry Store / Maloney's Knife / The Stake Out" | 4:58 |
| 8. | "The Second Séance" | 2:20 |
| 9. | "Nothing Held Back" | 0:37 |
| 10. | "The White Mustang" | 1:19 |
| 11. | "Blanche and George" | 1:17 |
| 12. | "Maloney's Exit" | 2:03 |
| 13. | "Share and Share Alike" | 0:54 |
| 14. | "The Mondrian Shot / The Revealed Identity" | 1:47 |
| 15. | "The Search Montage" | 3:41 |
| 16. | "Blanche's Arrival / Blanche's Note" | 2:29 |
| 17. | "Blanche Gets the Needle" | 3:03 |
| 18. | "Breaking Into the House" | 5:16 |
| 19. | "The Secret Door / Blanche Wakes Up" | 1:39 |
| 20. | "End Cast" | 4:14 |
| 21. | "Family Plot Theme" | 2:38 |
| 22. | "The Stonecutter" | 6:35 |

== Release ==
Released in the year of the United States Bicentennial, Family Plot was chosen to open the 1976 Filmex (Los Angeles International Film Exposition) to honor American cinematography.

== Reception ==
=== Box office ===
Family Plot earned over $6.8 million in domestic rentals from the United States and Canada.

=== Critical reaction ===
Vincent Canby of The New York Times called the film "a witty, relaxed lark", adding that it was "certainly Hitchcock's most cheerful film in a long time, but it's hardly innocent."

Roger Ebert gave the film three out of four stars, saying of it: "And it's a delight for two contradictory reasons: because it's pure Hitchcock, with its meticulous construction and attention to detail, and because it's something new for Hitchcock—a macabre comedy, essentially. He doesn't go for shock here, or for violent effects, but for the gradual tightening of a narrative noose."

Variety called the film "a dazzling achievement for Alfred Hitchcock. Masterfully controlling finely-tuned shifts from comedy to drama throughout a highly complex mystery-suspense plot, Hitchcock has created a film that has the involving detail work and teasing fascination of a novel to be read in front of a crackling fire on a rainy evening."

Charles Champlin of the Los Angeles Times praised the film as "atmospheric, characterful, precisely paced, intricately plotted, exciting and suspenseful, beautifully acted and, perhaps more than anything else, amusing."

Penelope Gilliatt of The New Yorker called Family Plot "one of the saltiest and most endearing" films Hitchcock ever directed, adding, "Sometimes in his career, Hitchcock has seemed to manipulate the audience; in this, his fifty-third film, he is our accomplice, turning his sense of play to our benefit."

Richard Combs of The Monthly Film Bulletin praised "the compact allusiveness and crisp elegance of Ernest Lehman's writing, which so deftly builds its own tongue-in-cheek attitudes into the material," and found that Bruce Dern and Barbara Harris made "a delightfully nuanced comic duet."

Dave Kehr of the Chicago Reader called the film "[A] small masterpiece, one of Hitchcock's most adventurous and expressive experiments in narrative form."

Gene Siskel of the Chicago Tribune gave the film two-and-a-half stars and calls it a "disappointment", finding that it "descends into dull jokes, plastic characters, and a television sitcom conclusion." Gary Arnold of The Washington Post calls the film "a chore to sit through", adding, "Lehman and Hitchcock are trying to recapture the old magic, but they've lost their touch."

Family Plot holds a 90% approval rating on Rotten Tomatoes, based on 40 reviews, and an average rating of 7 out of 10. The site's critical consensus reads: "The Master of Suspense's swan song finds him aiming for pulpy thrills and hitting the target, delivering a twisty crime story with pleasurable bite."

On Metacritic, the film has a weighted average score of 79 out of 100 based on eight critics, indicating "generally favorable reviews".

Barbara Harris was nominated for Best Actress – Motion Picture Comedy or Musical at the 34th Golden Globe Awards. Lehman's screenplay earned him a 1977 Edgar Award from the Mystery Writers of America.

== Sources ==
- Ackroyd, Peter (2015). Alfred Hitchcock. London: Chatto & Windus. ISBN 978-0-701-16993-0.
- Kapsis, Robert E. (1992). Hitchcock: The Making of a Reputation. Chicago, Illinois: University of Chicago Press. ISBN 978-0-226-42487-3.
- McGilligan, Patrick (2003). Alfred Hitchcock: A Life in Darkness and Light. New York: Regan Books. ISBN 978-0-06-039322-9.
- Segaloff, Nat (2013). Final Cuts: The Last Films of 50 Great Directors. Bear Manor Media. ISBN 978-1-593-93233-6.
- Spoto, Donald (1983). The Dark Side of Genius: The Life of Alfred Hitchcock. New York: Da Capo Press. ISBN 978-0-306-80932-3.
