= Green Battlefield =

1943 novel

- First edition
- Author: Victor Canning
- Language: English
- Genre: War thriller
- Publisher: Hodder & Stoughton
- Publication date: 1943
- Publication place: United Kingdom
- Media type: Print
- Pages: 184

Green Battlefield is a 1943 war thriller novel by the British writer Victor Canning. It was published by Hodder & Stoughton and was the only novel he wrote during his military service in the Royal Artillery. Although comparatively successful, and reprinted in 1944, Canning himself was later dismissive of the novel saying "It was a topical book. I spun it off to cash in on the war story thing. It was quite a competent story, but nothing I’d want in the canon of works!." Nevertheless, it was translated into Italian and French, the first time his work had appeared in those languages.

== Synopsis ==
During the Second World War British pilot Patrick Orleigh is shot down over Occupied Normandy and parachutes to safety. He is taken in by local landowner Arlenne Resant. Trouble arises when her elderly but patriotic servant drunkenly shoots dead several German soldiers who have been billeted on her house. Orleigh and Resant now attempt to flee to the coast and escape to England.

== Bibliography ==
- Reilly, John M. Twentieth Century Crime & Mystery Writers. Springer, 2015.
- Higgins, John. A Rex Carver Companion. Marlodge. 2016. ISBN 0557093716
