= The Scorpio Letters =

1964 novel

- First edition
- Author: Victor Canning
- Language: English
- Genre: Thriller
- Publisher: Heinemann
- Publication date: 1964
- Publication place: United Kingdom
- Media type: Print

The Scorpio Letters is a 1964 thriller novel by the British writer Victor Canning. Following this stand-alone novel he began his Rex Carver series with The Whip Hand the following year.

== Synopsis ==
George Constantine is a friend of a professor being targeted by a blackmail ring, which is similarly threatening three other prominent British figures - a politician, a businessman and an actress. Joining forces with the actress' daughter, Constantine sets out to tackle the gang behind the operation, a mission that takes them across France and Switzerland.

== Adaptation ==
In 1967 it was adapted into a film of the same title produced by MGM Television, which aired on American television but was also given a cinematic release in several countries. Directed by Richard Thorpe it starred Alex Cord, Shirley Eaton and Laurence Naismith.

== Bibliography ==
- Goble, Alan. The Complete Index to Literary Sources in Film. Walter de Gruyter, 1999.
- Reilly, John M. Twentieth Century Crime & Mystery Writers. Springer, 2015.
