= Castle Minerva =

1954 novel

- First edition (UK)
- Author: Victor Canning
- Language: English
- Genre: Spy thriller
- Publisher: Hodder & Stoughton (UK); Sloane (US)
- Publication date: 1954
- Publication place: United Kingdom
- Media type: Print

Castle Minerva is a 1954 spy thriller novel by the British writer Victor Canning. It was published in the United States under the alternative title of A Handful of Silver. A contemporary review in The Sunday Times concluded "Castle Minerva not only brilliantly entertains; it satisfies".

== Synopsis ==
While taking a climbing holiday in North Wales, David Fraser encounters his old wartime comrade Colonel Drexel. Drexel wants him to go to Southern France for him to protect a young Arab prince whose country has valuable oil reserves and will sign a treaty once he comes of age. However, only a few days after arriving in Banyuls-sur-Mer in the Pyrenees, the prince goes missing and Fraser is blamed.

== Film adaptation ==
It was adapted into the British film Masquerade directed by Basil Dearden and starring Cliff Robertson, Jack Hawkins and Marisa Mell.

== Bibliography ==
- Goble, Alan. The Complete Index to Literary Sources in Film. Walter de Gruyter, 1999.
- Reilly, John M. Twentieth Century Crime & Mystery Writers. Springer, 2015.
