= Spy Hunt =

1950 film by George Sherman

- Directed by: George Sherman
- Screenplay by: George Zuckerman; Leonard Lee
- Based on: Panther's Moon by Victor Canning
- Produced by: Ralph Dietrich
- Starring: Howard Duff; Märta Torén
- Cinematography: Irving Glassberg
- Edited by: Ted J. Kent
- Production company: Universal-International Pictures
- Distributed by: Universal Pictures
- Release date: 1950
- Running time: 74 minutes
- Country: United States
- Language: English

Spy Hunt, also known as Panther's Moon, is a 1950 American espionage film noir, based on the novel Panther's Moon by Victor Canning, directed by George Sherman, and starring Howard Duff and Märta Torén. It was produced by Universal-International Pictures.

== Plot ==
In Milan, Catherine Uilven, an agent for the legitimate democratic government of an unnamed Central European country, conceals top secret microfilm in the collar of one of two circus panthers that are being transported by train to be taken to America. Steve Quain, an American stranded in Europe without money, has taken the job of accompanying the panthers so he can get back to America. Unaware of the microfilm, but attracted to Uilven whom he meets briefly when she poses as a reporter, he is in the final car of the freight train with the caged panthers when saboteurs, in the pay of the usurping government, detach it from the train in Switzerland. The car is derailed and crashes, injuring Quain and freeing the panthers.

Quain awakens from concussion in a small mountain hotel run by a non-practicing doctor, Dr Stahl. News quickly spreads about the panthers, and several shady characters descend on the hotel, including Uilven, a man claiming to be a game hunter, a man claiming to be an artist, and a man claiming to be a reporter, as well as troops from the Swiss army. When Quain disturbs one of the men threatening Uilven, he knocks the man out, and he and Uilven team up. One of the troops is killed by a panther. One of the panthers is killed, but it is not the one with the microfilm. The hotel's guests all venture out at night, hunting for the remaining panther.

== Cast ==
- Howard Duff as Steve Quain
- Märta Torén as Catherine Uilven
- Philip Friend as Chris Denson
- Robert Douglas as Paradou
- Philip Dorn as Paul Kopel
- Walter Slezak as Doctor Stahl
- Kurt Kreuger as Captain Heimer
- Aram Katcher as Georg

== See also ==
- List of American films of 1950
