= Masquerade (1965 film) =

1965 British film by Basil Dearden

- Theatrical release poster by Jack Rickard
- Directed by: Basil Dearden
- Written by: William Goldman; Michael Relph
- Based on: Castle Minerva by Victor Canning
- Produced by: Michael Relph
- Starring: Cliff Robertson; Jack Hawkins; Marisa Mell
- Cinematography: Otto Heller
- Edited by: John D. Guthridge
- Music by: Phillip Green
- Production company: Michael Relph Productions
- Distributed by: United Artists
- Release dates: 13 April 1965 (London); 28 April 1965 (New York City)
- Running time: 102 minutes
- Country: United Kingdom
- Language: English

Masquerade is a 1965 British comedy thriller film directed by Basil Dearden based on the 1954 novel Castle Minerva by Victor Canning. It stars Cliff Robertson and Jack Hawkins and was filmed in the U.K. and in Spain.

== Plot ==
The contract giving Britain the right to the oil fields in the fictitious country of Ramat in the Middle East is coming to an end. The current ruler wishes to sell the rights to the Eastern Bloc. However, the heir to the throne, prince Jamil, is coming of age (turning 14) and is more lenient to British interests.

To protect the rights of the British and the Anglo Oil Media Company, the British government, led by Sir Robert, launch a secret mission to kidnap the prince (with his consent) to protect him from assassination before he can take control of the oil. Colonel Drexel forces stuffy spy Benson to allow his old America buddy David Frazer, who fought with him in Ramat in WWII, to help. Frazer is promised £500 for the work. He agrees to help and is sent to Spain to wait at the safe house where they will hide the prince.

Frazer arrives in Spain and immediately meets beautiful French girl Sophie who offers him a ride to his villa. In the car, Frazer meets her friends including a big man with a gun. They take an interest in the boat at Fraser's villa. Frazer suspects they might be smugglers.

Frazer takes the boat out in the hopes of investigating the gang and running into Sophie, which he does and they make out on the boat. Meanwhile, Drexel successfully spirits the prince out of Ramat and back to the villa in Spain.

The next day, Sophie attempts to break into the boat house, but Frazer stops her as they continue to flirt. He also stops English tourist Dunwoody from hanging out in front of the house. Sophie then appears from the shadows and tells him to take care, kisses him, and steals his key.

Frazer heads back inside and gets a call from the gang saying they want the boat. Frazer heads to the dock to stop them, but when he arrives he gets knocked out from behind. When he awakens the prince is gone and Benson believes he was an accomplice. Benson tries to take him in for questioning, but on the way the gang abduct Frazer and drive him to an abandoned castle inside a wine barrel which makes him drunk.

In his drunken state, Sophie appears before him and he kisses her. The gang show this to the prince and frame Frazer as the leader of the kidnapping. Frazer is mad at Sophie, but later escapes with her help. He learns that the betrayer who set him up is his old friend Drexel, who wants to ransom the prince back to the British to get a huge pay off from the Oil company.

Drexel offers to cut Frazer in and pay him £50,000, but Frazer refuses and they fight. Frazer wins just as Dunwoody arrives. Dunwoody reveals he is actually a private detective sent to track down Drexel by his wife who wants a divorce. Frazer and Dunwoody team up and realize that the gang, consisting of a knife thrower, a little person, and performing dog, are circus people.

Frazer goes to the circus where he makes a plan with Sophie to travel to the gang's hide out, but is caught. It turns out he was betrayed again. This time by Dunwoody. He is working for the current ruler of Ramat who will pay him to kill the prince

Fraiser and Sophie are kept in a circus cage, where they make out some more, while Dunwoody negotiates. When he is shown the prince he moves to kill him, but the knife throwing man tries to stop him and is killed. Drexel then arrives and stops Dunwoody.

Drexel then flees with the prince telling the circus people to take care of Frazer. Instead of killing him they let him go saying they should never have gotten involved. Fraser wants to go after the prince and asks Sophie if she is coming. She says no because she is actually married to the big guy. Frazer leaves with no hard feelings, but before he does Sophie and him share one final kiss.

Dunwoody and Fraser arrive as Drexel tries to cross a dam construction site with the prince, who says he knows Drexel is the real kidnapper. In the ensuing shoot-out, Dunwoody is killed and, after a bridge collapses, Frazer saves the lives of both the prince and Drexel. Despite this, Drexel again tries to kill Frazer, but before he can, the police and Benson arrive.

Back in the Sir Robert's office, the group celebrate a job well done. Benson says it was obvious that Dunwoody was the mastermind behind the double kidnapping, while Drexel celebrates his new job with the oil company, for which he smugly says they are paying him an embarrassing amount. Sir Robert says he is glad that the prince let go of his ridiculous idea that Drexel was involved. Frazer is simply happy to have his £500. However, when it is handed to him, Sir Robert happily informs him that they took care of some problems he was having with the American IRS, and therefore is only paid £11 for his adventure.

== Cast ==
- Cliff Robertson as David Frazer
- Jack Hawkins as Colonel Drexel
- Marisa Mell as Sophie
- Michel Piccoli as George Sarrassin
- Bill Fraser as Dunwoody
- Charles Gray as Benson
- John Le Mesurier as Sir Robert
- Felix Aylmer as Henrickson
- Ernest Clark as Minister
- Tutte Lemkow as Paviot
- Keith Pyott as Gustave

== Production ==
Rex Harrison was originally meant to star but he dropped out and Cliff Robertson was hired to replace him. The film was the first screen credit for novelist William Goldman who had been hired to Americanize the dialogue for Robertson (Robertson had just commissioned Goldman to adapt Flowers for Algernon into the screenplay for Charly). Filming started on 3 June 1964 at Pinewood Studios under the title The Shabby Tiger. The unit then shifted to Madrid. Robertson's work on the film meant he had to turn down an offered part in Judith.

== Reception ==
Relph called it "really quite good... one of those pure entertainment films. But it really was quite entertaining, I think."

Filmink wrote the movie "isn't very good, incidentally – there's some clever twists and Marisa Mell is hugely fun, but it's emotionally hollow at the core, there's no stakes, and Robertson simply doesn't have the personality to carry the movie on charm alone."
