= Oh Dad, Poor Dad, Mamma's Hung You in the Closet and I'm Feelin' So Sad =

1963 play by Arthur Kopit

Oh Dad, Poor Dad, Mamma's Hung You in the Closet and I'm Feelin' So Sad: A Pseudoclassical Tragifarce in a Bastard French Tradition
- Original language: English
- Written by: Arthur Kopit
- Genre: Farce

Premiere
- Date: 1961
- Place: United States

Oh Dad, Poor Dad, Mamma's Hung You in the Closet and I'm Feelin' So Sad: A Pseudoclassical Tragifarce in a Bastard French Tradition was the first play written by Arthur Kopit.

== Plot ==
Described by the author as a "farce in three scenes", the story involves an overbearing mother who travels to a luxury resort in the Caribbean, bringing along her son and her deceased husband, preserved and in his casket.

== Background ==
Kopit was on a postgraduate scholarship from Harvard University when he entered the play in a playwriting contest. The play won the contest and an undergraduate production at Harvard, and gained the notice of the Phoenix Theatre in New York. Kopit explained: "I had been writing short stories, and I was having a lot of trouble with the narrative point of view. When I wrote a play, I found that I lost myself as Arthur Kopit and I just wrote down what the characters said. I wasn't anywhere in the play, and I liked that. In my fiction I was everywhere, and I didn't like that."

== Productions ==
The play was first presented at Harvard in February 1960 with a cast of undergraduates, directed by future filmmaker Michael Ritchie. The production attracted immediate interest. It premiered at London's Lyric Theatre on July 5, 1961, after a preview week at the Cambridge Arts Theatre. The cast was led by Stella Adler (Madame Rosepettle), Andrew Ray (Jonathan), Susan Burnet (Rosalie) and Ferdy Mayne (Commodore Roseabove). Steven Berkoff was cast as one of the play's seven hotel bellboys, and the director was Frank Corsaro. It then opened off-Broadway at the Phoenix Repertory Theatre on February 26, 1962. The director was Jerome Robbins and the cast featured Jo Van Fleet (Madame Rosepettle), Austin Pendleton (Jonathan), Barbara Harris (Rosalie) and Sándor Szabó (Commodore Roseabove). Kopit won the 1962 Drama Desk Award for the play, which then transferred to Broadway, opening at the Morosco Theatre on August 27, 1963 and closing on October 5. The principal roles were taken by Hermione Gingold (Madame Rosepettle), Sam Waterston (Jonathan), Alix Elias (Rosalie) and Sándor Szabó (Commodore Roseabove). The director was, again, Jerome Robbins.

In 1965, the play made its debut in London's West End, opening on October 6 at the Piccadilly Theatre. Directed by Charles Forsythe, it starred Hermione Gingold (Madame Rosepettle), Murray Melvin (Jonathan), Alix Elias (Rosalie) and Gerard Heinz (Commodore Roseabove).

Also in 1965, the play was turned into a film of the same name starring Rosalind Russell, Robert Morse, Barbara Harris (reprising her role from the 1962 Off-Broadway production) and Hugh Griffith, and directed by Richard Quine. The film's release was delayed until February 1967.
