= His Bones are Coral =

1955 novel

- First edition
- Author: Victor Canning
- Language: English
- Genre: Thriller
- Publisher: Hodder & Stoughton (UK); Sloane (US)
- Publication date: 1955
- Publication place: United Kingdom
- Media type: Print

His Bones are Coral is a 1955 thriller novel by the British writer Victor Canning. It was published in the United States with the alternative title of Twist of the Knife. The title is a reference to William Shakespeare's Full fathom five from The Tempest.

== Synopsis ==
Howard Smith, a pilot flying between Cairo and Port Sudan with a cargo of illicit drugs crash-lands in the desert near a port on the Red Sea. Escaping from the wreckage and needing to find a way out of his problems, he accept an offer from a marine biologist to take part in a coral-finding expedition in shark-infested waters.

== Film adaptation ==
It was adapted into the 1969 American film Shark! directed by Samuel Fuller and starring Burt Reynolds, Arthur Kennedy and Silvia Pinal.

== Bibliography ==
- Goble, Alan. The Complete Index to Literary Sources in Film. Walter de Gruyter, 1999.
- Reilly, John M. Twentieth Century Crime & Mystery Writers. Springer, 2015.
