= Shark! =

1969 Mexican-American action film by Samuel Fuller

- Directed by: Samuel Fuller
- Written by: Samuel Fuller; John Kingsbridge
- Based on: His Bones are Coral by Victor Canning
- Produced by: José Luis Calderón; Mark Cooper; Skip Steloff
- Starring: Burt Reynolds; Arthur Kennedy; Manuel Alvarado; Carlos Barry; Silvia Pinal
- Cinematography: Raúl Martínez Solares
- Edited by: Carlos Savage
- Music by: Rafael Moroyoqui
- Production companies: Cinematográfica Calderón S.A. Heritage Entertainment Inc.
- Distributed by: Excelsior Pictures
- Release date: October 8, 1969
- Running time: 92 minutes
- Countries: United States; Mexico
- Language: English
- Budget: $300,000

Shark! (also known as Caine and Man-Eater) is a 1969 Mexican-American action film directed by Samuel Fuller and starring Burt Reynolds and Silvia Pinal. In the film, a stranded gunrunner is recruited for a treasure hunting expedition in the Red Sea. The mission requires him to dive into shark-infested waters.

== Plot ==
Caine, a gunrunner, becomes stranded in a small port on the Red Sea. While there, he meets an attractive woman, Anna, who propositions him to dive into shark-infested waters off the coast. Though she alleges the purpose of the dive is scientific research, Caine eventually realizes that the woman and her partner are actually treasure hunters, and sees an opportunity to utilize the riches from the wreck they hope to raid to compensate for the earlier loss of his cargo.

== Cast ==
- Burt Reynolds as Caine
- Arthur Kennedy as Doc
- Barry Sullivan as Professor Dan Malair
- Silvia Pinal as Anna
- Francisco Reiguera as Joseph (credited as Francisco Reyguera)
- Enrique Lucero as Inspector Barok
- Manuel Alvarado as Latalah
- Carlos Barry as Runt

== Production ==
=== Development ===
The film was based on the novel His Bones are Coral by Victor Canning. This was serialized in 1954 and published in 1955. The original screenplay was written by Ken Hughes.

In July 1966 it was announced Gaumont Pictures would make a film from the novel, directed by Byron Haskin, starring George Montgomery and produced by Mark Cooper. It was to be called Twist of the Knife and to be filmed in Mexico in July. Filming did not proceed.

=== Sam Fuller ===
In April 1967 it was announced Twist of the Knife would be produced by Skip Steloff for Calderon-Stell and directed by Sam Fuller, his first film since The Naked Kiss. The cast would include Burt Reynolds, Arthur Kennedy and Barry Sullivan.

The film was to be the first in a series of co productions between Skip Steloff, Marc Cooper's Heritage Productions, and Jose Luis Calderon's Cinemtographia Calderon.

When Sam Fuller joined the project, he rewrote the script and retitled it Caine. He shared writing credit with John Kingsbridge.

Fuller later said "I liked the idea of making a story where, for once, the hero is really the heavy, the heavy is the girl, there's another heavy, and you find out in the end they're all heavies."

He elaborated, saying he liked "doing a story about four amoral characters... to show not only a double cross on a double cross but when we think we know who the heavy is, we find out the real heavy behind it all is the girl... I have the hero not only allow her to die, but he shrugs it off. I thought that was exciting... I had such fun because I went beyond the average switch of revealing the villain. I also didn't have the guy just let the girl go to jail; he lets her be eaten by sharks."

Even before filming began, the producers announced they had signed Fuller to a four-picture deal, including a sequel to Caine.

=== Shooting ===
Filming took place for nine weeks in 1967, in Manzanillo, Colima, Mexico, which stood in for the Sudan.

It has been claimed that while shooting in the waters of Isla Mujeres, one of the film's stuntmen, José Marco, was attacked and killed on camera by a shark that broke through protective netting. This supposed attack was said to be captured on film and prompted a photo spread in Life magazine. It has been claimed that the title was changed to Shark! to cash in on the controversy. However, in an investigation published in Skin Diver magazine, dive-shop operator Dewey Bergman claimed to have been unable to find any record of the supposed attack, receiving statements from local port authorities and medical officials which denied any knowledge of such an incident. Bergman concluded that the photographs published in Life were "of a dead or drugged grey shark", and later received a statement from Life's editorial counsel that the story "may, it turns out, have been a hoax". Marine biologist Richard Ellis wrote that "[i]t was a perfectly harmless sequence in which no one was hurt except the shark, which subsequently died", and claimed the photographs published in Life were accomplished with "lots of ketchup".

=== Post-production ===
Fuller supervised editing in Mexico City for four weeks. His cut was later re-edited by Herbert L. Strock without Fuller's approval. When he finally saw the version that was released to theaters, he said he thought it was "terrible. I told them I wanted to restore my original cut. They said they didn't know if they could get it from Mexico."

Fuller demanded the producers take his name off it. The producers refused.

== Release ==
=== Critical reception ===
The New York Times thought the film "still suggests the imagination of" Fuller.

=== Re-releases ===
The film was re-released by Hallmark in 1975 as Man-Eater to cash in on the success of Jaws. Advertising focused on the supposed death of the stuntman in the film.

The Los Angeles Times called this version "threadbare".

== See also ==
- List of American films of 1969

== Bibliography ==
- Dombrowski, Lisa (2008). The Films of Samuel Fuller: If You Die, I'll Kill You. Wesleyan University Press. ISBN 9780819568663.
- Fuller, Samuel (2012). Samuel Fuller: Interviews. Univ. Press of Mississippi. ISBN 9781617033063.
