= The Chasm (novel) =

1947 novel

- First edition (UK)
- Author: Victor Canning
- Language: English
- Genre: Thriller
- Publisher: Hodder & Stoughton (UK); M. S. Mill Co (US)
- Publication date: 1947
- Publication place: United Kingdom
- Media type: Print
- Pages: 316

The Chasm is a 1947 thriller novel by the British writer Victor Canning. It was his first novel since the Second World War during which he had served in the Royal Artillery and was largely absent from the writing world. The novel is inspired by the events of the partisan republic of Corniolo, on the Forlì Apennines. He increasingly turned to espionage and crime novels. It takes place in Italy where Canning had served during the Italian campaign.

== Synopsis ==
In postwar Italy Edward Burgess, a former British army officer still suffering from the effects of shell shock is working for the United Nations Relief and Rehabilitation Administration visits Florence. He believes he recognises a man he encounters in the street as William Martel an old university acquaintance, but who turns out to be an Italian art dealer. On a trip to the nearby countryside he encounters him again, posing as a local landowner. Burgess believes he really is Martel, now lying low because of his past collaboration with the Nazis. This knowledge in turn puts his own life in danger.

== Bibliography ==
- Burton, Alan. Historical Dictionary of British Spy Fiction. Rowman & Littlefield, 2016.
- Higgins, John. A Rex Carver Companion, Marlodge. 2016. ISBN 0557093716
- Reilly, John M. Twentieth Century Crime & Mystery Writers. Springer, 2015.
