= The Limbo Line =

1968 British film by Samuel Gallu

- Directed by: Samuel Gallu
- Written by: Donald James
- Based on: The Limbo Line by Victor Canning
- Produced by: Frank Bevis; William J. Gell
- Starring: Craig Stevens; Kate O'Mara; Eugene Deckers
- Cinematography: John Wilcox
- Edited by: Peter Weatherley
- Music by: Johnnie Spence
- Production companies: Trio Films; London Independent Producers
- Distributed by: London Independent Producers
- Release date: 10 December 1968
- Running time: 99 minutes
- Country: United Kingdom
- Language: English

The Limbo Line is a 1968 British spy thriller film directed by Samuel Gallu and starring Craig Stevens, Kate O'Mara and Eugene Deckers. It was written by Donald James based on the 1963 novel of the same title by Victor Canning. It was made as part of a 1960s boom in spy films in the wake of the success of the James Bond series.

== Plot ==
Through a network known as the "Limbo Line", the KGB is kidnapping figures who have recently defected to the West and returning them to the Soviet Union for punishment. A British intelligence agent identifies the ballerina Irina Tovskia as the next victim, and sets out to rescue her in a mission that takes him from London, to Amsterdam and finally to Lübeck on the East German border. He is able to destroy the Limbo Line, but not prevent Irina being taken to Moscow.

== Production ==
It was shot at Pinewood Studios with sets designed by the art director Scott MacGregor.

== Reception ==
The Monthly Film Bulletin wrote: "Naively propagandist espionage thriller. Hackneyed dialogue, feeble direction and ludicrous histrionics from most of the cast give the impression of something left over from the worst days of the Cold War."

Kine Weekly wrote: "A quite ingenious plot makes this an adventure acceptable to most types of audience. ... The story starts with some mystery, maybe a little too much, but once the main plot is established it moves confidently from one piece of robust action to the next, boils up to an exciting final chase and just elimination of most of the nasties, and then has a surprising, but appropriate, unhappy ending. It's all good, clean mayhem. American tough-guy actor Craig Stevens plays the part of Richard with athleticism and a vicious ability in the frequent hand-to-hand fights, and Vladek Sheybal is a heavy-lidded, villainous Oleg in the best sinister traditions. Kate O'Mara is the unfortunate Irina, and Moira Redmond is a deadly Ludmilla, whose good looks belie her evil ways."

Variety wrote: "Crammed with gunplay, scrapping and double-crossing this is one of those spy actioners that get a bit complicated plotwise but are useful entertainment as blenders with a contrasting film in easy-going situations. ... Donald James' screenplay, from Victor Canning's novel, is a bit short on wit and some of the dialog is limp and corny."

The Times called it old-fashioned.

The Morning Star reviewed it as "disastrously incompetent".

== Cast ==
- Craig Stevens as Richard Manston
- Kate O'Mara as Irina Tovskia
- Eugene Deckers as Cadillet
- Moira Redmond as Ludmilla
- Vladek Sheybal as Oleg
- Yolande Turner as Pauline
- Jean Marsh as Dilys
- Rosemary Rogers as Joan Halst
- Hugo De Vernier as Halst
- Alan Barry as Williams
- James Thornhill as Pieter
- Norman Bird as John Chivers
- Frederick Jaeger as Alex
- Eric Mason as Castle
- Denys Peek as Jan
- Robert Urquhart as Edward Hardwick
- Ferdy Mayne as Sutcliffe
- Joan Benham as Lady Faraday
- John Horsley as Richards

== Bibliography ==
- Burton, Alan. Looking-Glass Wars: Spies on British Screens since 1960. Vernon Press, 2018.
