= Firecrest (novel) =

1971 novel

- First edition (UK)
- Author: Victor Canning
- Language: English
- Genre: Spy thriller
- Publisher: Heinemann (UK); Morrow (US)
- Publication date: 1971
- Publication place: United Kingdom
- Media type: Print

Firecrest is a 1971 spy thriller novel by the British writer Victor Canning. A stand-alone novel, it introduced a more modern, darker and naturalistic style compared to Canning's previous novels. It marked the first appearance of "The Department", a shadowy dirty tricks agency working for the British government which featured in subsequent novels.

== Synopsis ==
The scientist Henry Dilling dies shortly after agreeing to sell some vital research to the British government. The papers are now missing and The Department assigns one of his agents John Grimster to track them down. Grimster was once a promising star of British intelligence but is now disgruntled as he believes that his superiors may have arranged the traffic accident that killed the Swedish woman he planned to marry, but who they regarded as a security risk.

== Bibliography ==
- Burton, Alan. Historical Dictionary of British Spy Fiction. Rowman & Littlefield, 2016. ISBN 978-1-4422-5586-9.
- Reilly, John M. Twentieth Century Crime & Mystery Writers. Springer, 2015.
