= The Rainbird Pattern =

1972 novel by Victor Canning

- First edition cover
- Author: Victor Canning
- Language: English
- Genre: Thriller, suspense
- Publisher: Heinemann
- Publication date: 1972
- Publication place: England, United Kingdom
- Media type: Print (Hardback & Paperback)
- Pages: 244

The Rainbird Pattern is a thriller novel by Victor Canning, published by Heinemann in 1972. The novel has been described as Canning's best work in the thriller genre.

== Synopsis ==
Elderly spinster Julia Rainbird, under sessions by medium Blanche Tyler, or "Madame Blanche", promises her a large sum of money to locate her illegitimate nephew, Edward Shoebridge. Blanche and her boyfriend, George Lumley, begin making inquiries around their area about the Shoebridges, despite no one knowing where Edward is, or if he is alive.

Meanwhile, Edward Shoebridge, alive and under the pseudonym of "the Trader", has been organising small kidnappings around the area, but is planning a larger score, the Archbishop of Canterbury, whom he will hold for a large ransom.

== Adaptations ==
The novel was adapted by writer Ernest Lehman into the film Family Plot, directed by Alfred Hitchcock, becoming his fifty-third and final motion picture. The film featured Barbara Harris and Bruce Dern as Blanche Tyler and George Lumley, with Karen Black as Francine and William Devane as Edward Shoebridge/Arthur Adamson.

The film deviates quite heavily from the book, with the most noticeable difference being that the film was adapted as a black comedy. Other small changes include the switching of setting from England to Northern California, and the fact that in the book, Blanche actually has psychic abilities, while in the film, she fakes them for financial gain.
