= The House of the Seven Flies =

1952 novel

- First edition (UK)
- Author: Victor Canning
- Language: English
- Genre: Thriller
- Publisher: Hodder & Stoughton (UK); William Morrow (US)
- Publication date: 1952
- Publication place: United Kingdom
- Media type: Print

The House of the Seven Flies is a 1952 thriller novel by the British writer Victor Canning. The plot revolves around a quarter of a million pounds worth of diamonds stolen from an Amsterdam bank, and the death of the man to whom ex-British Army officer Edward Furse rents out his boat.

== Film adaptation ==
In 1959 it was adapted into the film The House of the Seven Hawks directed by Richard Thorpe and starring Robert Taylor, Nicole Maurey and Linda Christian.

== Bibliography ==
- Goble, Alan. The Complete Index to Literary Sources in Film. Walter de Gruyter, 1999.
- Reilly, John M. Twentieth Century Crime & Mystery Writers. Springer, 2015.
