= The Python Project =

1967 novel

- First edition
- Author: Victor Canning
- Language: English
- Series: Rex Carver
- Genre: Spy thriller
- Publisher: Heinemann
- Publication date: 1967
- Publication place: United Kingdom
- Media type: Print
- Preceded by: Doubled in Diamonds
- Followed by: The Melting Man

The Python Project is a 1967 spy thriller novel by the British Victor Canning. It is the third in a series of four novels about Rex Carver, a private detective drawn back into his old profession of espionage. A complex plot which involves a jewel robbery and the exchange of prisoners between the British and Soviet intelligence services takes place in a variety of locations including London, Paris, Libya and the Balearic Islands.

== Bibliography ==
- Burton, Alan. Historical Dictionary of British Spy Fiction. Rowman & Littlefield, 2016.
- Murphy, Bruce F. The Encyclopedia of Murder and Mystery. Springer, 1999.
- Reilly, John M. Twentieth Century Crime & Mystery Writers. Springer, 2015.
