= Mr. Finchley Goes to Paris =

1938 novel

- First edition
- Author: Victor Canning
- Language: English
- Genre: Comedy
- Publisher: Hodder and Stoughton
- Publication date: 1938
- Publication place: United Kingdom
- Media type: Print
- Pages: 320
- ISBN: 9781788421621
- Preceded by: Mr. Finchley Discovers His England
- Followed by: Mr. Finchley Takes the Road

Mr. Finchley Goes to Paris is a comedy novel by the British writer Victor Canning.

== History ==
It was the second of a trilogy featuring the mild-mannered Edgar Finchley. The first publication in 1938 was by Hodder and Stoughton in the UK and Carrick and Evans in the USA. It was included in the Heinemann Uniform Edition of 1974, and a new edition has recently appeared (2019) from Farrago Books. In 1994 it was adapted for radio by the BBC starring Richard Griffiths

== Synopsis ==
The mild-mannered clerk Mr. Finchley is just about to propose marriage, when he is sent by his firm to Paris where he enjoys a further series of adventures, returning a week later with an orphan boy. He completes his proposal and they adopt the boy.

== Bibliography ==
- Ehland, Christoph and Wächter, Cornelia. Middlebrow and Gender, 1890-1945. BRILL, 2016.
- Reilly, John M. Twentieth Century Crime & Mystery Writers. Springer, 2015.
