= The Scorpio Letters (film) =

1967 film by Richard Thorpe

- DVD cover
- Based on: The Scorpio Letters by Victor Canning
- Teleplay by: Jo Eisinger; Adrian Spies
- Directed by: Richard Thorpe
- Starring: Alex Cord; Shirley Eaton; Laurence Naismith
- Music by: Dave Grusin
- Countries of origin: United Kingdom; United States
- Original language: English

Production
- Producer: Richard Thorpe
- Cinematography: Ellsworth Fredricks
- Editor: Richard W. Farrell
- Running time: 120 minutes
- Production company: Metro-Goldwyn-Mayer
- Budget: $900,000

Original release
- Network: ABC
- Release: 19 February 1967

The Scorpio Letters is a 1967 American-British made-for-TV movie directed by Richard Thorpe and starring Alex Cord, Shirley Eaton and Laurence Naismith. It was written by Jo Eisinger and Adrian Spies based on the 1964 novel of the same title by Victor Canning.

== Plot ==
Joe Christopher an American in London working for British Intelligence joins forces with Phoebe Stewart to investigate the death of a fellow agent who was the victim of a blackmail plot. Their pursuit of the truth takes them to Paris and an Alpine ski resort.

== Cast ==
- Alex Cord as Joe Christopher
- Shirley Eaton as Phoebe Stewart
- Laurence Naismith as Burr
- Oscar Beregi Jr. as Philippe Soriel (Scorpio)
- Lester Matthews as Mr. Harris
- Antoinette Bower as Terry
- Arthur Malet as Hinton
- Barry Ford as Bratter
- Émile Genest as Garin
- Vincent Beck as Paul Fretoni
- Ilka Windish as Miss Gunther
- Laurie Main as Tyson
- Andre Philippe as Gian
- Harry Raybould as Lodel
- Danielle De Metz as Marie
- Milton Parsons as Mr. Atkinson
- Ivor Barry as Rt. Hon. John Murney

== Production ==
The film was produced by MGM Television and shot mainly at MGM studios in Hollywood. It was the last film directed by Thorpe in a lengthy and prolific career.

There are significant differences between the book and the film version, which was designed to take advantage of the spy boom following the success of James Bond. Eaton was imported from Britain to play the female lead and her Bond link was advertised by billing her as "The Goldfinger Girl".

The film's sets were designed by the art directors Addison Hehr and George W. Davis. As it was intended for a cinematic run in several markets, particularly in Europe, it was made with higher production values than was often common for television films.

== Release ==
It was broadcast by ABC in the United States while being given a theatrical release in several countries including Britain.

== Reception ==
The Monthly Film Bulletin wrote: "This latest imitation Bond is a dud from start to finish, mainly because it ignores the basic rules of the spy thriller formula (original gimmicks to frost over the implausible and villains mean enough to be worth tracking down in the first place). Here the criminal organisation to be destroyed is about as threatening as a set of toy poodles, and Alex Cord as the agent looks more like an irate scoutmaster than an iron man of action. Some awkward plot continuity might have been broken up by fast cutting, but instead the script pauses at regular intervals to explain what it's all about. The result is a plodding piece of hokum without a whit of originality."

Kine Weekly wrote: "A rather complicated and talkative adventure, this will, however, be acceptable in most situations. Routine double-programmer. ... The trouble with this film in its role as a thriller is that it has too much mystery and not enough action. It starts with promise, when a man falls to his death from a high window, but subsequently loses its way on the track of red herrings wilfully created by having not only a ubiquitous organisation of villains but also two mildly rival British secret service agencies operating on the same problem apparently without liaison. The result is a certain amount of unnecessary confusion and a great deal of explanatory dialogue at the expense of action."

Variety described it as "very hip".
