= Plaza Suite (film) =

1971 film by Arthur Hiller

- Theatrical release poster
- Directed by: Arthur Hiller
- Written by: Neil Simon
- Based on: Plaza Suite; 1968 play by Neil Simon
- Produced by: Howard W. Koch
- Starring: Walter Matthau; Maureen Stapleton; Barbara Harris; Lee Grant
- Cinematography: Jack Marta
- Edited by: Frank Bracht
- Music by: Maurice Jarre
- Distributed by: Paramount Pictures
- Release date: May 12, 1971
- Running time: 114 minutes
- Country: United States
- Language: English
- Box office: $4 million (rentals)

Plaza Suite is a 1971 American comedy film directed by Arthur Hiller. The screenplay by Neil Simon is based on his 1968 play of the same title. The film stars Walter Matthau, Maureen Stapleton, Barbara Harris and Lee Grant.

== Plot ==
Like the play, the film is divided into three acts, all set in Suite 719 of New York City's Plaza Hotel. The first act focuses on not-so-blissfully wedded couple Sam and Karen Nash, who are revisiting their honeymoon suite in an attempt—by Karen—to bring back the love to their marriage. Her plan backfires, and the two become embroiled in a heated argument about whether Sam is having an affair with his secretary Miss McCormack. Sam eventually walks out, allegedly to attend to urgent business, and Karen remains to reflect on how things have changed since they were newlyweds.

The second act involves a meeting between Hollywood movie producer Jesse Kiplinger and his old flame, suburban housewife Muriel Tate. Muriel, aware of his reputation as a smooth-talking ladies' man, has come to the hotel for nothing more than a chat between old friends, promising herself that she will not stay long. Jesse, however, has other plans in mind and repeatedly attempts to seduce her.

The third act involves married couple Roy and Norma Hubley on the wedding day of their daughter Mimsey, who has locked herself in the suite's bathroom and stubbornly refuses to come out. Her parents frantically attempt to cajole her into attending her wedding while the gathered guests await the trio's arrival downstairs. Her fiancé eventually arrives and talks sense to her.

== Cast ==
- Walter Matthau as Sam Nash/Jesse Kiplinger/Roy Hubley
- Maureen Stapleton as Karen Nash
- Barbara Harris as Muriel Tate
- Lee Grant as Norma Hubley
- Louise Sorel as Jean McCormack
- Jenny Sullivan as Mimsey Hubley
- Alan North as Mr. Eisler

== Production ==
In the Broadway production of the original play, all three couples were played by George C. Scott and Maureen Stapleton. For the film adaptation, director Arthur Hiller decided to cast Walter Matthau in the three male roles. He used Stapleton, but only in the first segment; instead using Barbara Harris in the second segment and Lee Grant in the third.

Screenwriter Neil Simon was unhappy with the results. "I didn't like the cast. I didn't like the picture. I would only have used Walter in the last sequence and probably Lee Grant. I think Walter Matthau was wrong to play all three parts. That's a trick Peter Sellers can do." He continued, "I have to accept some of the blame for the film. I kept all the action in one room. It was rather confining. We could have gone into other suites. I didn't think it out, but I learned from that." A decade later, Matthau would work with Lee Grant's daughter and future actress Dinah Manoff in I Ought to Be in Pictures.

== Critical reception ==
On Rotten Tomatoes, Plaza Suite holds a rating of 67%, based on 21 reviews.

Vincent Canby of The New York Times called the film "an aggressively tiresome movie", writing that in the transition from stage to screen, "I don't have the feeling that anything much has been lost, but rather that nothing much was ever there".

Gene Siskel of the Chicago Tribune gave the film 3½ stars out of four, and wrote, "Well written, directed and acted, 'Plaza Suite' is one of the most diverting films of the year".

Arthur D. Murphy of Variety called the film an "excellent adaptation" of the play, with "generally very good direction".

Charles Champlin of the Los Angeles Times called the film "a bright, diverting comedy" that was "enriched by not one but four stop-the-presses performances".

Megan Rosenfeld of The Washington Post stated that "what was amusing on the stage looks stiff and unfunny on the screen. The three playlets that make up the script get progressively worse, going from bad to terrible to execrable."

Tom Milne of The Monthly Film Bulletin wrote, "Some pleasantly witty dialogue and sound performances make Plaza Suite a relatively painless experience, though Arthur Hiller's direction is killingly dull, and the very theatricality of the whole conception makes it look dangerously thin and pointless as a film."

== Awards and nominations ==
The film was nominated for the Golden Globe Award for Best Motion Picture – Musical or Comedy but lost to Fiddler on the Roof. Maureen Stapleton was nominated for the Golden Globe Award for Best Supporting Actress – Motion Picture but lost to Ann-Margret in Carnal Knowledge.

== Home media ==
The film was released on Region 1 DVD on November 25, 2003. It is in anamorphic widescreen format, with audio tracks in English and French, and subtitles in English.

== See also ==
- List of American films of 1971
