= The Bamboo Saucer =

1968 film

- Theatrical release poster
- Directed by: Frank Telford
- Screenplay by: Frank Telford
- Story by: Alford Van Ronkle (as Rip Von Ronkle); John P. Fulton (as John Fulton)
- Produced by: Charles E. Burns; Jerry Fairbanks
- Starring: Dan Duryea; John Ericson; Lois Nettleton
- Cinematography: Hal Mohr
- Edited by: Richard A. Harris (as Richard Harris)
- Music by: Edward Paul
- Production companies: National Telefilm Associates; Jerry Fairbanks Productions
- Distributed by: World Entertainment Corp.
- Release dates: October 23, 1968 (Boston, Massachusetts)
- Running time: 103 minutes
- Country: United States
- Language: English

The Bamboo Saucer is an independently made 1968 Cold War science fiction film drama about competing American and Russian teams that discover a flying saucer in Communist China. The film was re-released in 1969 under the title Collision Course with a reduced edited runtime of 90 minutes.

This was the final film for both actors Dan Duryea and Nan Leslie.

== Plot ==
Test pilot Fred Norwood is flying the experimental X-109 (actually an U.S. Airforce Lockheed F-104 Starfighter jet aircraft accompanied by a chase plane, another F-104). During the flight Norwood finds himself pursued by a flying saucer and has to engage in a series of tricky aerobatics to protect himself. Once on the ground, Norwood is informed that the radar tracking his jet picked up no other aircraft near him except the chase plane. Though Norwood insists on what he saw, his superiors believe he has had a series of hallucinations and order him off the project. Blanchard, under pressure from the USAF, testifies that the UFO was an optical illusion caused by aerial inversion.

Norwood decides to prove what he saw by patrolling the area in a surplus North American P-51 Mustang equipped with futuristic laser radar until he reaches the point of exhaustion. As Norwood sleeps, his best friend, Joe Vetry, a fellow pilot who is married to Norwood's sister Dorothy, takes off in the Mustang when the radar set picks up an unidentified flying object. Fred and Dorothy see Joe's aircraft vanish off the radar screen; later Federal Aviation Administration crash investigators tell Fred that the Mustang disintegrated in mid air in a manner similar to the accounts of the Mantell UFO incident.

Norwood is summoned to Washington D.C. to meet with Hank Peters, a member of an unnamed US government agency. Peters believes Norwood's account and shows him a sketch that Norwood identifies as the same blue saucer that buzzed the X-109. Peters tells Norwood that the sketch was provided from intelligence sources based in Red China. Because of Norwood's familiarity with a variety of aircraft, he is asked to accompany Peters and two scientists who will be parachuted into Red China. Peters informs Norwood that there are reliable sources that report the two humanoid aliens in the saucer died, likely from exposure to Earth bacteria. Due to rapid deterioration, their bodies were reported as cremated by Chinese peasants.

At the Chinese drop zone, they are met by American agent Sam Archibald who leads them to the saucer now hidden inside the ruins of a Catholic church. While evading units of the People's Liberation Army, they run across a party of Russian scientists led by Comrade Zagorsky. Among the group of Russians is gorgeous scientist Anna Karachev. After some tense moments the two competing parties begrudgingly decide to cooperate in investigating the hidden saucer.

They are soon discovered by the Chinese Army, and a firefight ensues. The three survivors - two Americans and one of the Russian scientists - board the saucer and fly out of Chinese airspace. A pre-programmed autopilot takes control and flies them away from Earth and on a collision course with Saturn. Working together, in less than one minute they are successful in regaining control of the saucer and return to Earth. A quote from President John F. Kennedy about mutual human cooperation in space flashes on screen.

== Cast ==
- Dan Duryea as Hank Peters, Duryea in his final film, movie was released post humously
- John Ericson as Test Pilot Fred Norwood
- Lois Nettleton as Anna Karachev
- Robert Hastings as Garson (credited as Bob Hastings)
- Vincent Beck as Zagorsky
- Bernard Fox as Ephram
- Robert Dane as Miller
- Rico Cattani as Dubovsky
- James Hong as Sam Archibald
- Bartlett Robinson as Rhodes
- Nick Katurich as Gadyakoff
- William Mims as Joe Vetry (credited as Bill Mims)
- Nan Leslie as Dorothy Vetry
- Andy Romano as Blanchard
- Frank Gerstle uncredited as control room technician

== Production ==
Jerry Fairbanks was a producer and sometimes director of a variety of cinematic short subjects series such as Strange as It Seems and Popular Science. A 1954 film trade article stated that Fairbanks was preparing his first theatrical motion picture, titled Project Saucer that was to be filmed in widescreen and color. A 1964 article stated that Fairbanks was moving production of his film Operation Blue Book from a runaway production in Spain to be filmed in the USA.

Fairbanks persevered and had a collaborator, Frank Telford, rewrite the screenplay by Alford "Rip" Van Ronkel and special effects man John P. Fulton with Telford directing the film in 1966. Fairbanks contacted the office of the United States Secretary of Defense about his screenplay. In an April 12, 1966 reply, the Office of the Assistant Secretary of Defense informed Fairbanks that they had a "negative reaction" to Project Saucer. They recommended that the screenplay delete any reference to the CIA, saying it would not be appropriate to place one of their operatives in the fictionalized situation. Furthermore, the flying saucer investigation was not factually set up; the Air Force's General was an unnecessarily uncomplimentary character and would not act as he does in the screenplay; it was also not clear just what part the Air Force played in the aircraft testing; any one of the aircraft manufacturers could clarify the film's opening sequence; finally, the Air Force should not be utilized or included in the air drop inside Chinese air space.

Fairbanks incorporated the changes in the finished screenplay. Co-screenwriter, associate producer, and special effects expert John P. Fulton died during filming. The film was retitled The Bamboo Saucer, though it had no relation to the 1967 published science fiction novel The Flight of the Bamboo Saucer. The experimental X-109 aircraft was actually Air Force stock footage of a Lockheed F-104 Starfighter. The film was shot in 1966 by cinematographer Hal Mohr at Lone Pine, California, where a standing Western Street set was turned into a Chinese village for the production.

== Critical reception ==
Writing on DVD Talk, film critic Glenn Erickson described the film as a "real turnip of a sci-fi thriller", that "it stumbles badly in the special effects department," and that "almost nothing happens in the film, even after the flying saucer finally shows up in the last reel."

== Soundtrack ==
- Yablochko

composed by Reinhold Glière

== Home media ==
The Bamboo Saucer was released on DVD and Blu-ray in April 2014 by Olive Films, formatted in the anamorphic widescreen 1.78:1 aspect ratio. It is also available for viewing at YouTube.

== See also ==
- List of American films of 1968
- The 1950 independently made Cold War science fiction film The Flying Saucer
- Hangar 18, a similar film from 1980
- 2010: The Year We Make Contact, a film from 1984 featuring US-Soviet collaboration
