= The House of the Seven Hawks =

- Theatrical Film Poster
- Directed by: Richard Thorpe
- Screenplay by: Jo Eisinger
- Based on: The House of the Seven Flies; 1952 novel by Victor Canning
- Produced by: David Rose
- Starring: Robert Taylor; Nicole Maurey; Linda Christian
- Cinematography: Ted Scaife
- Edited by: Ernest Walter
- Music by: Clifton Parker
- Production company: Coronado Productions
- Distributed by: Metro-Goldwyn-Mayer
- Release date: 29 October 1959
- Running time: 92 minutes
- Country: United Kingdom
- Language: English
- Budget: $535,000
- Box office: $1,065,000

The House of the Seven Hawks is a 1959 British mystery film directed by Richard Thorpe and starring Robert Taylor, Nicole Maurey and Linda Christian. It was written by Jo Eisinger based on the 1952 Victor Canning novel The House of the Seven Flies. It was the final film by Robert Taylor under his twenty five-year contract with MGM. The film follows an American captain searching for sunken treasure who becomes entangled with criminals and is arrested by the Dutch police.

== Plot ==
American skipper John Nordley becomes entangled with the Dutch police and international crooks over sunken Nazi treasure but survives and finds romance.

== Cast ==
- Robert Taylor as John Nordley
- Nicole Maurey as Constanta Sluiter
- Linda Christian as Elsa
- Donald Wolfit as Inspector Van Der Stoor
- David Kossoff as Wilhelm Dekker
- Eric Pohlmann as Captain Rohner
- Philo Hauser as Charlie Ponz
- Gerard Heinz as Inspector Sluiter
- Paul Hardtmuth as Beukleman
- Lily Kann as Gerta
- Richard Shaw as Police Sgt. Straatman
- André van Gyseghem as hotel clerk
- Leslie Weston as Tulper
- Guy Deghy as Desk Lieutenant
- Peter Welch as Gannett
- Peter Lannagan as Peter

== Reception ==
=== Critical ===
The Monthly Film Bulletin wrote: "The plot is over-complicated to the point of confusion, and much time is wasted as the characters try to explain it to each other. In all other respects, despite the Dutch setting and a prolonged night sequence on tinted stock a little hard to look at, this is the usual thriller about an American adventurer's skirmishes with dishonest Europeans, briefly enlivened by David Kossoff's performance as a fussy, timid little crook."

Picturegoer wrote: "It's the kind of unpretentious, fast, unfussy modern swashbuckling that is wholly entertaining. And is due to a workable, if corny, plot served up with an acid twist of humour. Heading a first-rate supporting staff is David Kosoff, as an efieminate thug, and Philo Hauser, as a spiv Dutch dealer. Nicole Maurey and Linda Christian amply serve the glamour department. But it's Taylor's comeback as an animated actor that makes this jaunt across the North Sea a joy."

The New York Times called the film "an unpretentious but satisfying entertainment."

In The Radio Times Guide to Films Adrian Turner gave the film 2/5 stars, writing: "Workhorse director Richard Thorpe had just completed some uncredited second unit work on MGM epic Ben-Hur when he was sent by the studio to Britain and Holland to direct this bland 'B' movie."

=== Box office ===
According to MGM records, the film earned $415,000 in the U.S. and Canada and $650,000 elsewhere, resulting in a loss of $20,000.

== See also ==
- List of British films of 1959
