= Panther's Moon =

1948 novel

- First edition
- Author: Victor Canning
- Language: English
- Genre: Thriller
- Publisher: Hodder & Stoughton
- Publication date: 1948
- Publication place: United Kingdom
- Media type: Print

Panther's Moon is a 1948 spy thriller novel by the British writer Victor Canning. It was his second post-war novel, following The Chasm, as he had largely taken a break from writing during his wartime service.

== Synopsis ==
Roger Quain is tasked by his circus owner uncle to bring a couple of black panthers from Milan to Paris. The next day before he leaves Italy, he is approached by an attractive young woman who identifies herself as a member of British intelligence. Urgently needing to smuggle microfilm out of Italy, she believes that the panthers offer the perfect opportunity to get them across the border. Things go wrong, however, when their train is derailed in the Swiss Alps and both the panthers and the microfilm disappear.

== Film adaptation ==
In 1950 it was adapted into the American film Spy Hunt directed by George Sherman and starring Howard Duff, Märta Torén and Philip Friend.

== Bibliography ==
- Burton, Alan. Historical Dictionary of British Spy Fiction. Rowman & Littlefield, 2016.
- Goble, Alan. The Complete Index to Literary Sources in Film. Walter de Gruyter, 1999.
- Reilly, John M. Twentieth Century Crime & Mystery Writers. Springer, 2015.
