= Oh Dad, Poor Dad, Mamma's Hung You in the Closet and I'm Feelin' So Sad (film) =

1967 American film by Richard Quine

- Directed by: Richard Quine
- Written by: Ian Bernard
- Based on: Oh Dad, Poor Dad, Mamma's Hung You in the Closet and I'm Feelin' So Sad (play) by Arthur L. Kopit
- Produced by: Stanley Rubin; Ray Stark
- Starring: Rosalind Russell; Robert Morse; Barbara Harris; Hugh Griffith; Jonathan Winters
- Cinematography: Geoffrey Unsworth; Charles Lawton Jr.(Uncredited)
- Edited by: Warren Low; David Wages
- Music by: Neal Hefti
- Production company: Seven Arts Productions
- Distributed by: Paramount Pictures
- Release date: February 15, 1967
- Running time: 86 minutes
- Country: United States
- Language: English
- Budget: $2.175 million or $3.5 million

Oh Dad, Poor Dad, Mamma's Hung You in the Closet and I'm Feelin' So Sad is a 1967 American black comedy film directed by Richard Quine, based on the 1962 play of the same name by Arthur L. Kopit. The screenplay was written by Ian Bernard. The film stars Rosalind Russell, Robert Morse and Barbara Harris; Harris was the only main cast member who had also appeared in the original, Off-Broadway production of the play.

== Plot ==
Described by Kopit as a "farce in three scenes", the story involves an overbearing mother who travels to a luxury resort in the Caribbean, bringing along her son and her deceased husband, preserved and in his casket.

== Cast ==
- Rosalind Russell as Madame Rosepettle
- Robert Morse as Jonathan
- Barbara Harris as Rosalie
- Hugh Griffith as Commodore Roseabove
- Jonathan Winters as Dad (Narrator)
- Lionel Jeffries as Airport Commander
- Cyril Delevanti as Hawkins
- Hiram Sherman as Breckenduff
- George Kirby as Moses
- Janis Hansen as The Other Woman

== Production ==
Although filming was completed by July, 1965, the movie was shelved for re-editing and the shooting of additional scenes after it was poorly received during previews. New scenes were directed by Alexander Mackendrick. An entirely new music score was also added. The film was released in February 1967. It was the last film produced by Seven Arts Productions and released by Paramount Pictures following the purchasing of Warner Bros. by Seven Arts in November 1966.
