= The Whip Hand (novel) =

1965 novel

- First edition
- Author: Victor Canning
- Language: English
- Series: Rex Carver
- Genre: Spy thriller
- Publisher: Heinemann
- Publication date: 1965
- Publication place: United Kingdom
- Media type: Print
- Followed by: Doubled in Diamonds

The Whip Hand is a 1965 spy novel by the British writer Victor Canning. It is the first in a series of four novels about Rex Carver, a private detective drawn back into his old profession of espionage. The novel also features the secret service agent Manston who had also appeared in The Limbo Line, Canning's previous novel.

== Synopsis ==
Carver is hired to find Katerina, a missing German au pair who has gone missing in Brighton. His pursuit takes him to Paris, Dubrovnik, Venice and finally to Germany, where he finds the matter revolves around former Nazis.

== Bibliography ==
- Burton, Alan. Historical Dictionary of British Spy Fiction. Rowman & Littlefield, 2016.
- Murphy, Bruce F. The Encyclopedia of Murder and Mystery. Springer, 1999.
- Reilly, John M. Twentieth Century Crime & Mystery Writers. Springer, 2015.
