= Fountain Inn (novel) =

1939 novel

- First edition
- Author: Victor Canning
- Language: English
- Genre: Mystery
- Publisher: Hodder and Stoughton
- Publication date: 1939
- Publication place: United Kingdom
- Media type: Print
- Pages: 270
- ISBN: 9781788421799

Fountain Inn is a 1939 mystery detective novel by the British writer Victor Canning. Canning had made his name with his comedy novels featuring Mr. Finchley. This was his first attempt at a thriller, but after the war he increasingly switched to writing thrillers. It received positive reviews with The Guardian noting "Fountain Inn, which is extremely well written, is the attractive kind of detective story in which the main interest is not “Who?” but “How?”". The first edition was by Hodder and Stoughton, but there was a reissue in 1974 by Heinemann, and it was republished in 2019 by Farrago Books.

== Synopsis ==
The plot revolves around the Fountain Inn building, part of the Inns of Chancery complex near Holborn, where several businesses are based including the husband and wife detective agency run by Helen and Ben Brown. The Browns are hired to investigate another organisation in the building, the Society for Progressive Rehabilitation, which has recently received a large bequest under possibly dubious circumstances. The Brown's own secretary Grace has connections with the Society, and due to information she has overheard, is kidnapped.

== Bibliography ==
- Reilly, John M. Twentieth Century Crime & Mystery Writers. Springer, 2015.
