= A Forest of Eyes =

1950 novel by Victor Canning

- First edition
- Author: Victor Canning
- Language: English
- Genre: Thriller
- Publisher: Hodder & Stoughton
- Publication date: 1950
- Publication place: United Kingdom
- Media type: Print

A Forest of Eyes is a 1950 spy thriller novel by the British writer Victor Canning. Stylistically it owed a debt to Canning's friend, the writer Eric Ambler.

The novel is set in Yugoslavia then located behind the Iron Curtain before the Tito–Stalin split. Robert Hudson, an engineer in Dubrovnik falls foul of the local police chief Zarko who believes is responsible for the death of a fellow Englishman, likely involved in espionage. Rather reluctantly Hudson finds himself taking over the dead man's mission.

== Bibliography ==
- Burton, Alan. Historical Dictionary of British Spy Fiction. Rowman & Littlefield, 2016.
- Murphy, Bruce F. The Encyclopedia of Murder and Mystery. Springer, 1999.
- Reilly, John M. Twentieth Century Crime & Mystery Writers. Springer, 2015.
