= Golden Salamander (film) =

- Directed by: Ronald Neame
- Written by: Ronald Neame; Victor Canning; Lesley Storm
- Based on: The Golden Salamander by Victor Canning
- Produced by: Alexander Galperson
- Starring: Trevor Howard; Anouk Aimée; Herbert Lom; Jacques Sernas
- Cinematography: Oswald Morris
- Edited by: Jack Harris
- Music by: William Alwyn
- Production company: Pinewood Films
- Distributed by: General Film Distributors; Eagle-Lion (US)
- Release date: 1 February 1950 (London)
- Running time: 87 minutes
- Country: United Kingdom
- Language: English

Golden Salamander is a 1950 British adventure film directed by Ronald Neame and starring Trevor Howard, Anouk Aimée and Herbert Lom. It won an award at the 1950 Locarno International Film Festival. It is based on Victor Canning's 1949 novel The Golden Salamander, about a British archaeologist in North Africa who runs afoul of a crime syndicate.

It was shot at Pinewood Studios, with sets designed by the art director John Bryan. Extensive location shooting took place in Tunisia, including the ruins of Carthage. The score was composed by William Alwyn who incorporated Arabic themes into his work. It was given an American release by Eagle-Lion the following year.

== Plot ==
Sent by the British Museum to take charge of the shipping to London of important artefacts, David Redfern's route along an isolated Tunisian road is blocked by a landslide. During a heavy rain he makes his way to the town, but not before witnessing a gun-running operation. At the café in the town he meets Anna, a young Frenchwoman who with her brother Max had moved to North Africa during the wartime German occupation of France. Realising that Max is mixed up in the gun-running, Redfern decides to remain silent about what he has witnessed and concentrate instead on his job of removing the artefacts as quickly as he can.

As he spends time in Anna's company, Redfern falls in love with her and decides to help Max escape from the criminal existence in which he has become trapped and send him to Paris where as a talented painter he can make a fresh start. However Max is killed by his associate on the way to Tunis.

Realising that Redfern knows too much about their operations, Serafis, the head of the criminal outfit, and his henchman Rankl plan to kill him and make it look like an accident. With the help of a friend, Redfern is able to escape. Tracked by his enemies during the town's annual boar hunt, he manages to demonstrate to the authorities that the gang have murdered Max.

== Cast ==
- Trevor Howard as David Redfern
- Anouk Aimée as Anna
- Herbert Lom as Rankl
- Jacques Sernas as Max
- Walter Rilla as Serafis
- Miles Malleson as Douvet
- Wilfrid Hyde-White as Agno
- Peter Copley as Aribi
- Marcel Poncin as Dommic
- Kathleen Boutall as Mme. Guillard
- Eugene Deckers as Police Chief
- Percy Walsh as Guillard
- Sybille Binder as Mme. Labree
- Valentine Dyall as Ben Ahrim
- Henry Edwards as Jeffries

== Bibliography ==
- Ian Johnson. William Alwyn: The Art of Film Music. Boydell Press, 2005.
