= Shirley Seifert =

American historical fiction author

Shirley Seifert (May 22, 1888 – 1971) was an American historical fiction author. She was best known as the author of The Proud Way (1953), which tells the story of the courtship between Confederate President Jefferson Davis and his second wife, Varina Howell, and The Wayfarer (1938), which was nominated for a Pulitzer Prize. Seifert was a founding member of the St. Louis Writers Guild and was twice named a "St. Louis Woman of Distinction."

== Life ==
Born in St. Peters, Missouri on May 22, 1888, Seifert was the older sister of fellow writers Adele and Elizabeth Seifert and majored in classical and modern languages at Washington University in St. Louis. After working as a teacher for three years, Seifert took courses in journalism at the University of Wisconsin–Madison School of Journalism and began writing fiction.

Seifert died in 1971 at the age of 83.

== Literary career ==
Seifert wrote several historical novels, many of which are set in the American South and Midwest in the years during and preceding the American Civil War. Several of her novels were inspired by the lives of real historical figures.

Short stories by Seifert have appeared in The Saturday Evening Post, McCall's, New York Herald-Tribune, Redbook, and The American Magazine.

=== Bibliography ===
==== Novels ====
- Land of Tomorrow
- The Wayfarer (1938)
- River Out of Eden (1940)
- Never No More
- Three Lives of Elizabeth (1952)
- The Proud Way (1953)
- Captain Grant
- Waters of the Wilderness
- The Senator's Lady (1967)

==== Short stories ====
- "The Girl Who Was Too Good Looking" (1919)
- "To-Morrow" (1920)
