= The Limbo Line (novel) =

1963 novel

- First edition
- Author: Victor Canning
- Language: English
- Genre: Spy thriller
- Publisher: Heinemann
- Publication date: 1963
- Publication place: United Kingdom
- Media type: Print

The Limbo Line is a 1963 spy thriller novel by the British writer Victor Canning. A former British secret service agent Richard Manston is called out of retirement to tackle a Soviet spy network kidnapping recent defectors to be taken back to Moscow.

The book acts as a prequel to the four Rex Carver novels in that it introduces the Government agency that Carver is later unwillingly drawn into. Manston also appears as a character in some of the Rex Carver books.

== Film adaptation ==
In 1968 the novel was turned into a film of the same title directed by Samuel Gallu and starring Craig Stevens and Kate O'Mara. The story was reissued by Pan Books as a tie-in with the film release.

== Bibliography ==
- Burton, Alan. Looking-Glass Wars: Spies on British Screens since 1960. Vernon Press, 2018.
- Goble, Alan. The Complete Index to Literary Sources in Film. Walter de Gruyter, 1999.
