= The Golden Salamander =

1949 novel by Victor Canning

- First edition (UK)
- Author: Victor Canning
- Cover artist: Leslie Wood
- Language: English
- Genre: Thriller
- Publisher: Hodder & Stoughton
- Publication date: 1949
- Publication place: United Kingdom
- Media type: Print

The Golden Salamander is a 1949 thriller novel by the British writer Victor Canning.

== Plot ==
On a visit to a sleepy North African town on a mission to catalogue relics for a British museum, professor of ethnology and former covert agent David Redfern becomes involved in an arms smuggling racket and a romance with a local woman.

== Reception ==
The novel was positively reviewed in The News and Observer, The Sun, The Capital Times, the Star-Phoenix, and the Hartford Courant. In The New York Times, Orville Prescott called it "good clean fun".

== Film adaptation ==
In 1949 the novel was adapted into the film Golden Salamander, directed by Ronald Neame, and starring Trevor Howard, Anouk Aimée, and Herbert Lom.
