= Elizabeth Seifert =

American writer

- Born: Elizabeth Seifert; June 19, 1897; Washington, Missouri, U.S.
- Died: June 18, 1983 (aged 85); Moberly, Missouri, U.S.
- Education: Washington University in St. Louis
- Occupation: Novelist
- Spouse: John J. Gasparotti (m. 1920–1959)
- Children: 4
- Writing career
- Pen name: Ashley, Ellen
- Genres: Romance, Medical fiction
- Notable awards: Redbook Award

Bess Gasparotti (June 19, 1897 – June 18, 1983), commonly known under her pen name of Elizabeth Seifert, was an American novelist known for her novels centered around the medical profession. She was reported by the St. Louis Globe-Democrat to be one of the two of "Moberly's Most Famous Women".

== Biography ==
Seifert was born in Washington, Missouri, the daughter of Richard Chester Seifert, a railroad engineer, and Anna Sanford. She had two sisters, Shirley and Adele Seifert, who were authors based in St. Louis. In 1918, she received an A.B. degree from Washington University in St. Louis, where she majored in English. Seifert had initially enrolled in the university's medical school, where she was the only female student, intending to become a doctor, but dropped out after a year and a half when her family did not encourage her ambition and university officials told her that as a woman, she could complete her medical training but would not be awarded a degree. She continued taking some medical courses, including anatomy, physiology, and medical dietetics, and also audited a creative writing class.

After leaving medical school, Seifert worked in various capacities in hospitals and in the Social Hygiene Bureau during World War I. In 1920, she married John J. Gasparotti, a World War I veteran, and the couple moved to Moberly, Missouri, where Gasparotti operated an ice plant. They had four children together.

In 1937, Seifert's husband was declared totally disabled due to war injuries, and with four teenage children to support, Seifert began writing more seriously in her spare time to supplement the family's income. That year, she completed her first manuscript, Young Doctor Galahad. Seifert sent the manuscript to her sister, Shirley Seifert, a writer of historical fiction, who forwarded it to her publisher, who recognized it as an exceptional first novel and helped Seifert enter it in a contest held by Dodd, Mead & Co., and sponsored by Redbook, where it won a $10,000 (roughly US$223,958 today) award.

Following the success of Young Doctor Galahad in 1938, Seifert quit her hospital job and began writing full-time, with the goal of producing two novels per year. All of her stories dealt with the lives of doctors, and she published over 80 novels under her maiden name. Her work was widely popular, with most of her novels being translated into multiple languages, serialized, and appearing in various formats.

In 1942, Seifert found herself the subject of an unflattering article in the St. Louis Globe-Democrat newspaper. Written by reporter Mildred Planthold, the article portrayed Seifert as aloof and disliking the town of Moberly, where she had lived for over two decades. Seifert strongly disputed the article's claims, calling it full of "inaccuracies and distortions." She rejected the assertion that she "openly admits" to not liking Moberly, pointing out that she had many close friends in the community. Seifert also corrected the article's misleading statements about the availability and sales of her novels at the local bookstore. Though she found the article "regrettable" and "unkind," Seifert believed the controversy it stirred up may have ultimately led to greater understanding between herself and the people of Moberly.

In addition to her writing career, Seifert enjoyed reading and traveling, until a fall in the late 1970s that injured her shoulder. This injury forced her to adapt her typing technique, learning to type with one hand. Seifert was active in various organizations and was known for her generosity with her time, often speaking at events. Seifert died on June 18, 1983, in Moberly, Missouri.

== Selected works ==
Notable titles:

- Young Doctor Galahad (1938)
- Hillbilly Doctor (1941)
- Army Doctor (1942)
- Surgeon In Charge (1942)
- A Certain Doctor (1943)
- Dusty Spring (1947)
- Take Three Doctors (1947)
- Hospital Zone (1948)
- Miss Doctor (1951)
- Hometown Doctor (1959)
- Rival Doctors (1967)

== Bibliography ==
- Dains, Mary K. (February 2000). "Seifert, Elizabeth (1897-1983), novelist". American National Biography. New York: Oxford University Press. doi:10.1093/anb/9780198606697.article.1602811. (subscription required)
