= Doubled in Diamonds =

1966 novel

- First edition
- Author: Victor Canning
- Language: English
- Series: Rex Carver
- Genre: Spy thriller
- Publisher: Heinemann
- Publication date: 1966
- Publication place: United Kingdom
- Media type: Print
- Preceded by: The Whip Hand
- Followed by: The Python Project

Doubled in Diamonds is a 1966 spy thriller novel by the British Victor Canning. It is the second in a series of four novels about Rex Carver, a private detective drawn back into his old profession of espionage.

== Synopsis ==
Carver is hired to find a man who has failed to claim an inheritance, who is turns out has been involved in a diamond heist. His mission takes him to Dublin and France, and draws him into a plot overseen by two Chinese twins, who are agents of the communist government, to sell drugs and earn hard currency for their country.

== Bibliography ==
- Burton, Alan. Historical Dictionary of British Spy Fiction. Rowman & Littlefield, 2016.
- Murphy, Bruce F. The Encyclopedia of Murder and Mystery. Springer, 1999.
- Reilly, John M. Twentieth Century Crime & Mystery Writers. Springer, 2015.
