= Finchley Central =

Finchley Central may refer to:

- Finchley Central tube station
- Finchley Central (game), mind game
- Church End, Finchley, also known as Finchley Central
- A song by The New Vaudeville Band
