= Mr. Finchley =

Fictional character created by Victor Canning

Mr. Finchley is a fictional character in three comic novels by Victor Canning, a novelist who later gained great success with thrillers. He first appears in Canning's very first book, Mr. Finchley Discovers His England, published in 1934 and as Mr. Finchley's Holiday in the USA in 1935.

== Notable adventures ==
He is introduced as a 45-year-old London solicitor's clerk who is told by his boss to take a holiday for the first time in his life. On his way to the railway station he agrees to keep watch on a car, goes to sleep on the back seat, and wakes to find it being driven off by a thief and pursued by the police. This is the first of around 20 disconnected episodes which take Mr Finchley gradually west to Land's End and then back to London.

In the second book, Mr. Finchley Goes to Paris (1938), he befriends and in the end adopts an orphan boy, and in the third, Mr. Finchley Takes the Road (1940), he marries and explores the county of Kent in a horse-drawn caravan.

== In other media ==
A series of radio dramatisations were made by the BBC in the 1980s featuring Richard Griffiths, and these were rebroadcast in 2005 on BBC 7 and currently (2021) being broadcast on BBC Radio4 Extra and available on BBC Sounds.

== Notes ==
In an early draft of his first book, Canning called his character "Mr. Pitcheley". His address is Nassington Avenue, Hampstead, which does not exist although Nassington Road does.
