= Rex Carver =

Rex Carver is a fictional British private eye created by the prolific writer Victor Canning. He appeared in four fast-paced, irreverently narrated novels in the 1960s.

In the book preceding the novels, The Limbo Line (1963), the Government agency that Carver is unwillingly drawn into is described for the first time. It introduces Richard Manston, a retired agent drawn back into the world of spies, who also appears as a character in some of the later Rex Carver books.

Although strictly a private investigator, Carver knows a number of people who work for a shadowy British undercover agency and he frequently runs into both enemy agents and hostile British agents during his adventures. It is by no means a stretch to call his adventures spy thrillers or to consider Carver himself a secret agent of sorts.

== Rex Carver novels ==
- The Whip Hand (1965). Carver agrees to track down a German au pair, Katerina Saxmann, who has gone missing in Brighton. But when the security services show up at his apartment within hours of him accepting the assignment, he realises there is far more going on. As the search leads Carver around the pleasure spots of Europe, the investigation, and his feelings for Katerina, get more complicated. But when a spectre from the continent’s past rears its head, Rex realises he might be in too deep.
- Doubled in Diamonds (1966). When Rex Carver is taken on by a solicitor’s firm to trace the sole beneficiary, one Arthur Finch, of an estate worth £6,000, he barely considers the job worth going out into the freezing weather for. But there is far more ice involved than Carver could have imagined. When he connects the seemingly innocuous yet hard-to-find Finch with a Hatton Garden diamond heist, he books the first flight to Finch’s bolthole in Ireland, determined to smoke him out.
- The Python Project (1967). An antique gold python bracelet, with diamonds for eyes and emeralds for scales, has been stolen from the home of its owner. The insurance company accountable for the jewellery wants it found, and hires Carver to recover it. When he discovers that the thief has also disappeared, an international chase around the Mediterranean ensues. But as he closes in on his target, so too does the net constrict around him. Rex must slip the coils of this snake while he can still breathe.
- The Melting Man (1968). Rex Carver wants a holiday, and is determined to have one. So when millionaire Cavan O’Dowda attempts to hire him to track down some stolen property, the answer is a flat ‘No’. Until, that is, Cavan’s beautiful daughter, Julia, arrives to collect him. The property in question is a top-of-the-range Mercedes, missing in France somewhere between Evian and Cannes; the driver turned up in Cannes without the car, and with no memory of the prior 48 hours. O’Dowda wants the vehicle, and the papers concealed within it, recovered at any cost.
