= Mr. Finchley Discovers His England =

1934 novel

- First edition
- Author: Victor Canning
- Language: English
- Genre: Comedy
- Publisher: Hodder and Stoughton
- Publication date: 1934
- Publication place: United Kingdom
- Media type: Print
- Pages: 352
- ISBN: 9781788421614
- Followed by: Mr. Finchley Goes to Paris

Mr. Finchley Discovers His England is a 1934 comedy novel by the British writer Victor Canning. It was published by Hodder and Stoughton, and a US edition published by Reynal and Hitchcock appeared in 1935 under the title Mr. Finchley's Holiday. Subsequently there were post-war editions from Pan Books, Heinemann and, most recently (2019), from Farrago Books. It was the first of a trilogy starring the mild-mannered Edgar Finchley. The novel was a bestseller and allowed Canning to leave his job and devote himself full time to writing, later becoming known in particular for his thrillers.

== Synopsis ==
Mister Finchley a middle-aged solicitor's clerk is told to take a holiday, for the first time in his working life. He plans to go to the seaside but enjoys a series of comic adventures on the way, and learns to love his native England.

== Bibliography ==
- Burton, Alan. Historical Dictionary of British Spy Fiction. Rowman & Littlefield, 2016.
- Ehland, Christoph and Wächter, Cornelia. Middlebrow and Gender, 1890-1945. BRILL, 2016.
