= Booth Review =

Booth review or Booth Review may refer to:

- Chicago Booth Review, published by the University of Chicago Booth School of Business
- Instant replay; specifically,
  - Instant replay in football officiating, when initiated by the Replay Assistant, as opposed to a coach's challenge.

== See also ==
- Instant replay (disambiguation)
