= Robert P. Davis =

American novelist

- Born: October 8, 1929
- Died: November 7, 2005 (aged 76); Providence, RI, U.S.
- Occupations: Screenwriter, author
- Writing career
- Genre: Aviation
- Notable work: The Pilot

Robert P. Davis (October 8, 1929 – November 7, 2005) was an American author, screenwriter, and film director whose works are primarily centered on aviation.

His 1960 short film Day of the Painter won an Academy Award in 1961 for Best Short Subject.

Davis's 1976 novel The Pilot, about an alcohol-abusing airline captain, served as the source material for his screenplay for the motion picture of the same title, released in 1980, in which Cliff Robertson acted out the lead role and which Robertson also directed.

== Movies and TV ==
- Day of the Painter (short film) (1960)
- The Pilot (1980)
- Final Descent (TV) (1997), based on The Glass Cockpit

== Books ==
- The Pilot (New York: Morrow, 1976)
- Cat Five (New York: Pocket Books, 1977)
- Control Tower (New York: Putnam's, 1980)
- The Glass Cockpit (1991)
