= I Shot Down the Red Baron, I Think =

Incomplete Hollywood film

- Directed by: Cliff Robertson
- Screenplay by: William Kerby
- Story by: Cliff Robertson
- Produced by: Cliff Robertson
- Starring: Cliff Robertson
- Production company: Cinerama
- Country: United States
- Language: English

I Shot Down the Red Baron, I Think is an incomplete film directed and produced by Cliff Robertson who also starred. The screenplay was written by William Kerby. Robertson wrote the original story, which he called "a sociological comedy".

== Production ==
=== Development ===
After the success of Charly, for which he won an Academy Award for Best Actor, Robertson, who was a flying enthusiast, wanted to make a film for which he had written a treatment called I Shot Down the Red Baron, I Think. It was to be a period comedy portraying the Red Baron as a homosexual. Robertson was approached by a man in Ireland who had several World War I planes in excellent condition. Cinerama agreed to finance filming of aerial footage at a cost of $150,000. The deal was negotiated by Robertson's then-agent David Begelman. As Robertson understood it, if Cinerama liked the footage they would finance the rest of the film; if they did not Robertson would have the option of reimbursing them the money.

=== Initial shooting ===
Robertson began filming in Ireland in mid 1969, shooting the aerial footage. Cinerama financed 13 days of filming. Robertson estimated this was twenty percent of the film. He then edited the footage and sought financing to complete the rest of the movie.

In July 1970 it was reported AIP had signed a deal with Robertson who was working on the script with William Kerby. Principal photography was to be continued in Spain.

=== Financial issues ===
Cinerama ran into financial trouble and elected not to proceed with the movie. They demanded Robertson repay them but he argued he only had an option to do this. Robertson's own agent, David Begelman, lied when he sided with Cinerama in the dispute. Because of Begelman's deception, Robertson was ordered to pay Cinerama the full amount; unable to trust Begelman, Robertson fired him. Begelman would later forge Robertson's signature on a check, causing a scandal in Hollywood.

The film, which would have been Robertson's directorial debut and first produced film, was never finished although as late as 1975 Robertson was still hopeful of making it; Dina Merrill, his wife, mentioned it was her next project in January 1976. Robertson later made other flying-themed movies such as Ace Eli and Rodger of the Skies and The Pilot.

== Notes ==
- McClintick, David (1983). Indecent exposure : a true story of Hollywood and Wall Street. New York.
