= Instant replay (disambiguation) =

Instant replay is the process of replaying previously occurred events through the use of video technology.

Instant replay may also refer to:

== Media ==
- Instant Replay (Dan Hartman album), 1978
- Instant Replay (magazine-format video)
- Instant Replay (The Monkees album), 1969
- Instant Replay (Pizzicato Five album), 1993
- "Instant Replay" (song), a 1978 song by Dan Hartman
- Instant Replay (book), a 1968 book by Jerry Kramer

== Sports ==
- Instant replay in American and Canadian football
- Instant replay in Major League Baseball
- Instant Replay, a weekly sports highlight program on WGN-TV
- Instant Replay Game, a National Football League (NFL) game notable for its controversial use of instant replay
