= Instant Replay (video series) =

- Format: VHS and Beta-format videocassette
- Publisher: Chuck Azar
- Founder: Chuck Azar
- Founded: 1977
- Final issue: 1982
- Company: Instant Replay Video Magazine Inc.
- Country: United States
- Based in: Miami, Florida
- Language: English
- Website: irvm.com

Instant Replay was the first magazine-format, direct-to-video program for home-video consumers. Established by Miami, Florida, entrepreneur Chuck Azar in 1977, and released on VHS and Beta-format videocassettes through 1982, it contained segments devoted to live music performances, reports from technology and electronics conventions, interviews, bloopers and other off-air content from network- and cable-television satellite feeds, and home-video hobbyists' contributions, among other content. It was predated by a direct-to-video trade magazine, Videofashion, sold to fashion-industry professionals on industrial U-Matic videocassettes.

== History ==
Instant Replay was established by Miami, Florida, entrepreneur Chuck Azar in 1977 as the first magazine-format, direct-to-video program for home-video consumers. Based in the city's Coconut Grove district, the namesake company, Instant Replay Video Magazine Inc., produced numerous editions of its magazine-format video, which ran two hours each and retailed for $59.95 initially and later $80 through 1982. Yearly subscriptions sold for $1,000 and included access to a 10,000-hour library of recorded video. Instant Replay was available both by mail order and at a small number of retail outlets.

While the magazine-format video program ceased production in 1982, the company itself continues to exist as of at least 2016, as a video library of over 30,000 hours.

Previously, a direct-to-video trade magazine, Videofashion, from the New York City-based Videofashion Inc., was sold to fashion-industry professionals on industrial U-Matic videocassettes, beginning in 1976. It became nominally a consumer magazine in 1979, with one-hour videocassettes available through the Time-Life Video Club for $395 each.

== Content ==
Each edition of Instant Replay contained approximately 10 regular segments. The "First Anniversary Issue" included:

- Video News
- Video Art
- Commercial Potential, consisting of commercials from other countries, not otherwise available in the U.S. at the time
- Sports Spot, generally in the form of sports footage set to music, in the manner of proto-music videos
- Illustrated Music, including David Bowie's "Space Oddity" set to NASA footage or Steppenwolf's "Magic Carpet Ride" set against footage shot from a roller coaster
- Did You Miss This?, consisting of "odds and ends from broadcast TV, HBO and elsewhere," such as "Saturday Night Live's Bill Murray popping a Polaroid flash on the Weekend Update set, thereby burning a hole in the sensitive lens of a $10,000 TV camera and giving viewers a brown spot on their screens for the rest of the show whenever that camera was used."
- Technical Corner
- Satellite News, focusing on home satellite dishes and including non-aired footage captured by hobbyists recording the continuous satellite feeds.
- Segments featuring clips sent in by "correspondents"
- Interviews, including with Jack Valenti, head of the Motion Picture Association of America; telecommunications mogul Ted Turner; television pioneer Vladimir Zworykin.

== Editions ==
Two hours each unless otherwise indicated. Source:

- Video Art Issue

Budokan video concert, Ron Hays' Odyssey, computer artist Saul Bernstein, 1980 Consumer Electronics Show, more, including "Technical Corner" with video artist Skip Sweeney on creating visuals using video feedback.

- Video Music Issue

Billy Preston interview, segments featuring Devo and The Doors, more.

- First Anniversary Issue

Ron Hays' Star Wars concert, Jack Valenti interview, reports on Magnavox videodisc player, backyard satellite dishes, and Anthony Quinn, more.

- Flight Issue

Bob Hoover "video stuntride", Evel Knievel biography, Cliff Robertson interview on film The Pilot, more.

- Funkausstellung Issue

Report from the Internationale Funkausstellung Berlin.

Special editions

- International Air Race & Show (90 minutes)

Reports on stunt pilot Bob Hoover, author Martin Caidin, The Amazing Sonic Acrojets

- C.E.S. 1979 (40 minutes)
- C.E.S. 1980 (60 minutes)

Reports from the Consumer Electronics Show

- Ecological Jazz Band (45 minutes)

Concert featuring band including Duffy Jackson of Count Basie's Orchestra and trumpeter Frankie Man.

- SPTS '80 (60 minutes)

Report from the National Conference of Home Satellite Pioneers

- 1980 Bacardi Speedboat Race (30 minutes)

Report from the Florida speedboat competition.

- Madness Takes Its Toll (30 minutes)

Richard O'Brien interview, report from a The Rocky Horror Picture Show event.

- Test Tape (running time n.a.)

Color bars, grids, crosshatches, patterns and other tools for testing VCR and TV quality

- IR Sampler (running time n.a.)

== Critical analysis and legacy ==
Magazine-format video programs, which one writer in 1980 dubbed "videozines," became common by the mid-1980s, running the gamut from McGraw-Hill's Aviation Week to Karl-Lorimar Home Video's Playboy Video Magazine. As one journalist wrote in 1988,

Although this is a concept that's now starting to gain widespread attention, the notion of a true magazine on videocassette is hardly new. More than a decade ago … Chuck Azar founded the form with Instant Replay, a one-hour [sic] magazine that provided information about the latest video equipment, along with tips and techniques for the home consumer. Issued sporadically, the video magazine was … way ahead of its time.

Azar remained active in the video and electronics industries, serving on the policy-making council of the RIAA's video division, and through his company produced the pre-MTV half-hour weekly music-video program Rock 'n' Roll 'n' Vision on the Miami, Florida, TV station WPLG. He invented a multi-standard VCR, branded as the Instant Replay Image Translator, that could play and record both US-format NTSC and international PAL-format videocassettes.
