= Washington: Behind Closed Doors =

1977 American television miniseries

- 3-disc DVD cover
- Genre: Drama
- Created by: David W. Rintels
- Based on: The Company by John Ehrlichman
- Written by: Eric Bercovici; John Ehrlichman; David W. Rintels
- Directed by: Gary Nelson
- Starring: Cliff Robertson; Jason Robards; Stefanie Powers
- Theme music composer: Dominic Frontiere (5 episodes); Richard Markowitz (1 episode)
- Country of origin: United States
- Original language: English
- No. of episodes: 6

Production
- Producers: Eric Bercovici; Frank Cardea; Stanley Kallis; Norman S. Powell; David W. Rintels
- Cinematography: Joseph F. Biroc (6 episodes); Jack Swain (5 episodes)
- Editors: Gerard Wilson (6 episodes); Harry Kaye (3 episodes); Arthur Hilton
- Running time: 750 minutes
- Production company: Paramount Television

Original release
- Network: ABC
- Release: September 6 – September 11, 1977

Washington: Behind Closed Doors is a 1977 American television miniseries produced by Paramount Television, that was broadcast in six parts, airing across six consecutive nights on ABC, from September 6 to September 11, 1977.

The fictional story is loosely based on John Ehrlichman's 1976 book The Company, a novel inspired by the author's tenure as a top aide in the Nixon administration.

== Plot ==
The film is a lavish fictionalized re-telling of the Watergate story (loosely based on ex-Nixon aide John Ehrlichman's novel The Company) mixing political intrigue and personal drama and centering on the rise of a power-hungry American president and the men with whom he surrounds himself in order to keep his grip on his office. The story builds from a soap-opera start into a trenchant study of power that corrupts.

== Primary cast ==
- Cliff Robertson as William Martin (Richard Helms, Director of Central Intelligence)
- Jason Robards as President Richard Monckton (Richard M. Nixon, 37th President)
- Stefanie Powers as Sally Whalen
- Robert Vaughn as Frank Flaherty (Harry R. Haldeman, White House Chief of Staff)
- Lois Nettleton as Linda Martin
- Barry Nelson as Bob Bailey
- Harold Gould as Carl Tessler (Henry Kissinger, Assistant to the President for National Security Affairs)
- Tony Bill as Adam Gardiner (Jeb Stuart Magruder, Special Assistant to the President)
- Andy Griffith as President Esker Scott Anderson (Lyndon B. Johnson, 36th President)
- John Houseman as Myron Dunn
- David Selby as Roger Castle
- Meg Foster as Jenny Jamison
- Peter Coffield as Eli McGinn
- Frances Lee McCain as Paula Stoner Gardiner
- Barry Primus as Joe Wisnovsky
- Diana Ewing as Kathy Ferris
- Lara Parker as Wanda Elliott
- John Lehne as Tucker Tallford (John Ehrlichman, Assistant to the President for Domestic Affairs)
- Alan Oppenheimer as Simon Cappell
- Nicholas Pryor as Hank Ferris (Ronald L. Ziegler, White House Press Secretary)
- Frank Marth as Lawrence Allison
- Thayer David as Elmer Morse (John Edgar Hoover, Director of the Federal Bureau of Investigation)
- George Gaynes as Brewster Perry
- Linden Chiles as Jack Atherton
- Skip Homeier as Lars Haglund
- John Randolph as Bennett Lowman
- Bonnie Bartlett as Joan Bailey
- Joseph Sirola as Ozymandias

== Production ==
Washington: Behind Closed Doors cost $8 million to film and produce.

== Release ==
The 12 ½‐hour television miniseries was broadcast in 6 parts, airing across six consecutive nights on ABC from September 6 to September 11, 1977. The DVD was released on June 5, 2012.

== Reception ==
The show did well in the Nielsen ratings. The last segment (Sunday September 11) was the third-highest rated prime time program of the week (23.6 rating, 17.2 million homes); the Thursday episode was fourth (23 rating, 16.7 million); and the debut Tuesday episode ranked eighth (22 rating, or 16 million). Other parts finished 16th (Friday), 17th (Wednesday), and 25th (Saturday; typically a low viewership night) for the same week.

=== Critical response ===
John J. O'Connor of The New York Times wrote: "There are serious flaws in Washington: Behind Closed Doors. Some of the spy stuff is ludicrous. The secretcode telephone calls of one woman agent could have been snatched intact from a Lily Tomlin routine. But if the production can be brought back to the main plot, dispensing with its unnecessary distractions, it could serve nicely as a giant slice of escapism drenched in titillating reality. The series certainly beats most of the competition it will be facing this week."

=== Awards and nominations ===
Robert Vaughn received an Emmy Award for his performance as the President's Chief of Staff, with other nominations going to the show itself as Outstanding Series, to Jason Robards for his portrayal of President Richard Monckton with its overt Nixonian images, director Gary Nelson, cinematographers Joseph Biroc and Jack Swain, art directors Jack DeShields and Jamie Claytor and set decorator Barbara Kreiger.

- Primetime Emmy Award for Outstanding Supporting Actor in a Drama Series - Robert Vaughn (won)
- Primetime Emmy Award for Outstanding Miniseries (nominated)
- Primetime Emmy Award for Outstanding Lead Actor in a Miniseries or a Movie - Jason Robards (nominated)
