= Malone (film) =

1987 film by Harley Cokeliss

- Theatrical release poster
- Directed by: Harley Cokeliss (as Harley Cokliss)
- Screenplay by: Christopher Frank; Rudy Wurlitzer (uncredited)
- Based on: Shotgun by William Wingate
- Produced by: Leo L. Fuchs
- Starring: Burt Reynolds; Kenneth McMillan; Cynthia Gibb; Lauren Hutton; Cliff Robertson
- Cinematography: Gerald Hirschfeld
- Edited by: Todd Ramsay
- Music by: David Newman
- Distributed by: Orion Pictures
- Release date: May 1, 1987
- Running time: 92 minutes
- Country: United States
- Language: English
- Budget: $10 million
- Box office: $3,060,858

Malone is a 1987 American action thriller film starring Burt Reynolds in the eponymous role alongside Cliff Robertson, Cynthia Gibb, Lauren Hutton, Scott Wilson, and Kenneth McMillan. It is an adaptation of William Wingate's novel Shotgun, written by Christopher Frank and Rudy Wurlitzer, and directed by Harley Cokeliss (credited under his birth name Harley Cokliss).

== Plot ==
Richard Malone is a covert CIA operative specializing in assassinations, but has grown disillusioned with his line of work and suddenly resigns, much to the chagrin of his superiors. Malone begins driving aimlessly before his Ford Mustang breaks down in a rural Oregon valley. Malone pushes it to a gas station and garage owned by Paul Barlow, who runs the station with his 17-year-old daughter Jo. Barlow suggests the fastest way to repair the car is to tow it 60 miles to a larger service station. Malone opts to wait for the necessary parts to arrive. Paul invites Malone to stay in the spare room. Malone and Paul become friends as they discuss their respective military service in the Vietnam War.

Jo snoops through Malone's possessions, finding a handgun. Malone helps Paul with his repair work and sizes up the town, which is under the thumb of Charles Delaney, who buys up all the property he can and forces people to sell if they first refuse. Outwardly a respectable and affluent businessman, Delaney is, in fact, a white nationalist leading a group of terrorist cells throughout the country, turning the property he buys into havens for his cause. A group of Delaney's thugs harass Malone and Jo on a bridge and refuse to let them pass. Malone defends himself when he is attacked. He severely beats the ringleader, Dan Bollard, sending him to the hospital. Dan's brother, Calvin, is goaded into killing Malone by Delaney's right-hand man Madrid. Calvin tries to shoot Malone at the local barber shop, but Malone shoots and kills Calvin instead.

While Sheriff Hawkins is holding Malone at the jail, Delaney breezes in to introduce himself. Delaney tells the sheriff to let him go, then orders Madrid to arrange a hit on Malone. The next day, two hitmen come to the service station. Malone kills both with a shotgun that he had concealed in his room, but is badly wounded in the shootout. Hawkins instructs a deputy to drive Malone to the hospital. The deputy drives offroad, with Malone bouncing in the back seat. Realizing that the deputy is trying to kill him, Malone grabs the wheel and crashes the car.

Once he’s in the hospital, Malone's CIA handler Jamie arrives — sent by her superiors to assassinate Malone (by poisoning him) before Malone is wounded. They hole up together in a safe house where they rekindle their romance.

When Malone goes to pick up his car from the Barlows, Madrid leads an attack on the safe house. Jamie shoots one of the attackers but is captured by Madrid and his thugs. Madrid tortures Jamie to find out where Malone is located. She refuses to break and Madrid murders Jamie by suffocating her with a plastic bag. Malone returns to find Jamie's body with the bag still around her head.

An angry Malone soon infiltrates Delaney's sprawling compound, killing the henchmen, including Madrid, to avenge Jamie's death. Delaney retreats to his secret command center, where he tells Malone that he is part of a vast conspiracy of like-minded "patriots" who are buying up land and electing Congressmen to retake the country from "mongrels". Malone proceeds to kill Delaney and blow up his compound, then walks away, burning his Virginia driver's license.

== Cast ==
- Burt Reynolds as CIA Agent John Haggerty / Richard Malone
- Lauren Hutton as CIA Agent Jamie
- Cliff Robertson as Charles Delaney
- Kenneth McMillan as Sheriff Hawkins
- Cynthia Gibb as Jo Barlow
- Scott Wilson as Paul Barlow
- Alex Diakun as Madrid
- Philip Anglim as Harvey
- Tracey Walter as Calvin Bollard
- Dennis Burkley as Dan Bollard

== Production ==
The film was based on the novel Shotgun by William Wingate, which was published in 1980. The New York Times wrote "There is nothing at all new in" the book "but Mr. Wingate tells his story very well, and there is something in all of us that responds joyously to the sight of an avenging angel destroying bullies and the forces of evil."

Reynolds was paid $3 million for the role. He said at the time:

I was attracted to Malone because I thought there was a chance the movie might be more than a guy running away from his past. Let's be honest. The film is Shane. I am an ex-CIA man whose car breaks down in a small town who then gets close to a family and attempts to battle a Lyndon LaRouche character played by Cliff [Robertson]. I'm not doing Clint in Pale Rider. There's a little bit of Stallone from First Blood in this, but I'm not playing the damaged-goods-guy Sly became in Rambo. Just to show you how movies change, Gérard Depardieu and Christopher Lambert at one point were going to play Malone. I wonder how this guy got rewritten into me.

It was a difficult period in Reynolds' career. His last few films had been flops, there were rumors he had AIDS, and he was being sued for punching director Dick Richards on his previous film.

Filming started in August 1986 in Hedley, Canada.

== Release ==
=== Box office ===
Malone grossed $1,377,691 in its first weekend at theatres. Overall the film grossed $3,060,858 at theatres.

=== Home media ===
Malone was released on Blu-ray on August 29, 2023, by Kino Lorber.

== Reception ==
On the review aggregator website Rotten Tomatoes, 29% of 7 critics' reviews are positive, with an average rating of 2.9/10. The website's consensus reads: "An unoriginal modernization of the western Shane, often criticizing the predictable plot and Reynolds' performance, but praising the action scenes."

=== Critical response ===
Walter Goodman of The New York Times write: "Nobody could make Malone believable, but the director, Harley Cokliss, makes it watchable. He is fortunate in his cast."
