= Heartwood (film) =

- Directed by: Lanny Cotler
- Written by: Lanny Cotler; Stephen L. Cotler
- Produced by: Stephen L. Cotler
- Starring: Jason Robards; Hilary Swank
- Cinematography: Rob Sweeney
- Music by: Ray Colcord
- Release date: 1998
- Running time: 92 minutes
- Country: United States
- Language: English

Heartwood is a 1998 American independent drama film written and directed by Lanny Cotler and starring Jason Robards and Hilary Swank.

== Cast ==
- Jason Robards as Logan Reeser
- Eddie Mills as Frank Burris
- Hilary Swank as Sylvia Orsini
- John Terry as Joe Orsini
- Randall Batinkoff as Johnny Purfitt
- John Dennis Johnston as Carl Burris
