= Day of the Painter =

1960 film

- Promotional art by Tom Jung
- Directed by: Robert P. Davis
- Written by: Robert P. Davis
- Produced by: Ezra Reuben Baker, Production supervised by Duard Slattery
- Starring: Ezra Reuben Baker
- Music by: Eddy Lawrence Manson
- Distributed by: Union Film Distributors, Inc.
- Release date: September 1960
- Running time: 15 minutes
- Country: United States
- Language: English

Day of the Painter is a 1960 American short film directed by Robert P. Davis. It was filmed at Mamaroneck Harbor in Mamaroneck, NY.

Day of the Painter promotional mailing. Created by Tom Jung, 1960

== Plot and critical response ==
Time magazine:

An extremely funny 15-minute film, may be taken as a solemn leg-pull of the recent vogue for dribble-and-splotch painters, those athletic canvas-coverers whose style owes less to Van Gogh's brush technique than to Stan Laurel's custard pie stance. Or it may be taken as an explicit set of instructions for getting rich.

The film, a first-time effort by three ex-admen, begins with a loving shot of wharfs, fishing shacks and sounding sea-the sort of vista once sketched avidly by artists and now appreciated chiefly by retired couples who tour Cape Cod in late September. The artist is a burly fellow (Ezra Reuben Baker), recognizably aesthetic in paint-smeared dungarees, scurrilous red sweater and combat boots. He trundles a cart filled with paint buckets along a dock, then throws an enormous sheet of wallboard down on a mud flat ten feet below.

Soberly, with exquisite skill, using first a vigorous forehand, then a precisely executed backhand, the painter slops color from buckets. Clearly he is a master, for his stroke with the long-handled hoe is sure and strong, his touch with the dribble-stick more than Japanese in its delicacy. And when he fills a flare pistol with paint and fires the last accent of orange at his abstraction, he does not pull the trigger. He squeezes.

When the thing dries, he hacks it up in random rectangles with a power saw, then carefully signs each fragment. A seaplane, labeled "Galerie des Abstracts, Paris-New York," touches down. A man debarks whose rich, dark overcoat obviously proclaims him an art dealer. He strokes his jaw as he examines the paintings, eventually selects a small one, shakes hands with the painter and takes off. Pleased with himself, the painter matter-of-factly shoves the remaining works of art into the ocean. This, as the screen truly proclaims, is the end.

New York Herald Tribune:

A hilarious good - natured spoof of abstract-expressionist painting has been made the subject of a colored film-short called "Day of the Painter." .........Without sound or sub-titles (except for a delightful musical score somewhat reminiscent of that which accompanied the Alex Guinness film, "The Horse's Mouth") the film begins with the artist's awakening in a crumbling shack on a rickety pier reaching out over a picturesque stream. His "Wall Street Journal" is delivered by boat, and, having ascertained that his investments are doing well, he loads a wheelbarrow with assorted cans of paint, long sticks, and a spray gun, has two helpers carry his enormous blank canvas, and sets off to his muddy "studio" by the side of the stream. All day long he flings, scatters, shoots, pushes paint all over his canvas and himself. The picture grows, and, actually, turns out to be quite handsome-in the Jackson Pollock manner, of course, but attractive for all it imitativeness. Sea gulls and swans waddle by, their expressions rather suggesting that of critics.

At last the painter is finished, carefully studies his work-and then proceeds to cut the enormous canvas up into pieces.

At the end of the day a small seaplane comes by, docks alongside the pier, while the passenger-pilot, looking like any 57th St. dealer you care to name, surveys the day's work. He examines carefully, he ponders, and he finally selects one small segment of the canvas, places it in the plane, and takes off.

The painter takes all the other pieces, tosses them into the stream, and they float away with the gulls and swans, not unlike the unforgettable Gulley Jimson, in "The Horse's Mouth," floating gallantly out to sea in his battered tugboat.

Audiences, apparently, are enjoying the film-except for a group the other night who were plainly pro-abstract-expressionism, and hissed when the rest of the house applauded. None of it was ill-natured, however, probably because the abstract-expressionism picture being kidded looks so agreeable.

== Awards ==
Day of the Painter won an Oscar at the 33rd Academy Awards in 1961 for Best Short Subject.
