= Jason Robards =

American actor (1922–2000)

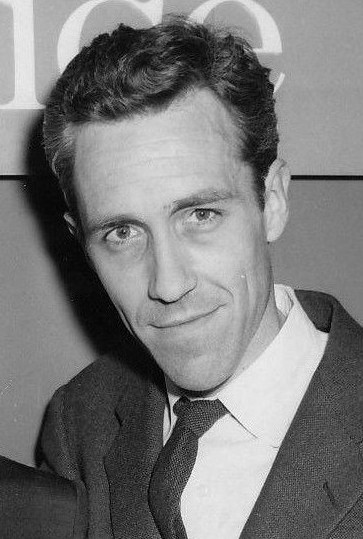
- Robards in 1956
- Born: Jason Nelson Robards Jr. July 26, 1922; Chicago, Illinois, U.S.
- Died: December 26, 2000 (aged 78); Bridgeport, Connecticut, U.S.
- Resting place: Oak Lawn Cemetery; Fairfield, Connecticut, U.S.
- Other name: Jason Robards Jr.
- Education: Hollywood High School; American Academy of Dramatic Arts
- Occupation: Actor
- Years active: 1947–2000
- Spouses: Eleanor Pittman (m. 1948; div. 1958) Rachel Taylor (m. 1959; div. 1961) Lauren Bacall (m. 1961; div. 1969) Lois O'Connor (m. 1970)
- Children: 6, including Sam Robards
- Parent: Jason Robards Sr. (father)
- Military career
- Allegiance: United States
- Branch: United States Navy
- Service years: 1940–1946
- Rank: Radioman first class
- Units: USS Northampton (CA-26); USS Nashville (CL-43)
- Conflicts: World War II: Pacific Theater; Battle of Tassafaronga
- Awards: Navy Good Conduct Medal; American Defense Service Medal; American Campaign Medal; Asiatic–Pacific Campaign Medal; World War II Victory Medal

Jason Nelson Robards Jr. (July 26, 1922 – December 26, 2000) was an American actor. Known for his roles on stage and screen, he gained a reputation as an interpreter of the works of playwright Eugene O'Neill. Robards received numerous accolades and is one of 24 performers to have achieved the Triple Crown of Acting having earned competitive wins for two Academy Awards, a Tony Award and a Primetime Emmy Award. In addition to these plaudits, Robards was nominated for five Golden Globes, two BAFTAs, an Actor Award, a Laurel Award and a Grammy Award. He was inducted into the American Theatre Hall of Fame in 1979, earned the National Medal of Arts in 1997, and the Kennedy Center Honors in 1999.

Robards started his career in theatre, making his Broadway debut playing James Tyrone Jr. in the 1956 revival of the Eugene O'Neill play Long Day's Journey into Night earning a Theatre World Award. He earned the Tony Award for Best Actor in a Play for his role in the Budd Schulberg play The Disenchanted (1959). His other Tony-nominated roles were in Long Day's Journey into Night (1956). Toys in the Attic (1960), After the Fall (1964), Hughie (1965), The Country Girl (1972), A Moon for the Misbegotten (1973), and A Touch of the Poet (1978).

He made his feature film debut in The Journey (1959). He went on to win two consecutive Academy Awards for Best Supporting Actor for playing Ben Bradlee in All the President's Men (1976), and Dashiell Hammett in Julia (1977). He was Oscar-nominated for playing Howard Hughes in Melvin and Howard (1980). His other notable films include Long Day's Journey into Night (1962), A Thousand Clowns (1965), Once Upon a Time in the West (1968), Tora! Tora! Tora! (1970), Parenthood (1989), Philadelphia (1993), Enemy of the State (1998), and Magnolia (1999).

On television, Robards won the Primetime Emmy Award for Outstanding Lead Actor in a Limited or Anthology Series or Movie for his performance as Henry Drummond in the NBC television adaptation Inherit the Wind (1988). His other Emmy-nominated roles were in Abe Lincoln in Illinois (1964), A Moon for the Misbegotten (1975), Washington: Behind Closed Doors (1977), and F.D.R.: The Last Year (1980).

== Early life and education ==
=== Family ===
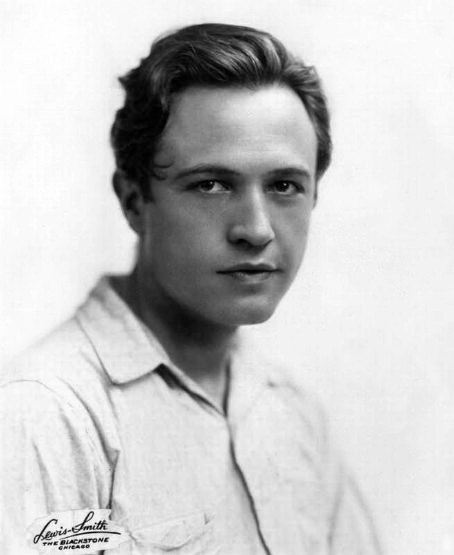
Jason Robards Sr. circa 1915

Robards was born July 26, 1922, in Chicago, Illinois, the son of actor Jason Robards Sr. and Hope Maxine Robards (née Glanville). He was of German, English, Welsh, Irish, and Swedish descent. The family moved to New York City when Jason Jr. was still a toddler, and then moved to Los Angeles when he was six years old. Later interviews with Robards suggested that the trauma of his parents' divorce, which occurred during his grade-school years, greatly affected his personality and world view. From his parents' first marriage together, he had a younger brother named Glenn. He had little or no contact with his mother after the divorce. She later married a second time to Arthur Milburn, making him his stepfather, although he may or may not have known about it at the time. His father married a second time to Agnes Lynch. He was probably closer to his stepmother than his biological one. From his father's second marriage, he had a half-sister named Laurel.

As a youth, Robards also experienced the decline of his father's acting career. The elder Robards had enjoyed considerable success during the era of silent films, but he fell out of favor after the advent of sound film, leaving the younger Robards soured on the Hollywood film industry. The teenage Robards excelled in athletics at Hollywood High School in Los Angeles. Although his prowess in sports attracted interest from several universities, Robards decided to enlist in the United States Navy upon his graduation in 1940.

=== Naval service ===
Following the completion of recruit training and radio school, Robards was assigned to the heavy cruiser USS Northampton in 1941 as a radioman 3rd class. On December 7, 1941, Northampton was at sea in the Pacific Ocean about 100 miles (160 km) off Hawaii. Contrary to some stories, he did not see the devastation of the Japanese attack on Hawaii until Northampton returned to Pearl Harbor two days later. Northampton was later directed into the Guadalcanal campaign in World War II's Pacific theater, where she participated in the Battle of the Santa Cruz Islands.

During the Battle of Tassafaronga in the waters north of Guadalcanal on the night of November 30, 1942, Northampton was sunk by hits from two Japanese torpedoes. Robards found himself treading water until near daybreak, when he was rescued by an American destroyer. For its service in the war, Northampton was awarded six battle stars. Two years later, in November 1944, Robards was radioman aboard the light cruiser USS Nashville, the flagship for the invasion of Mindoro in the northern Philippines. On December 13, she was struck by a kamikaze aircraft off Negros Island in the Philippines. The aircraft hit one of the port five-inch gun mounts, while the plane's two bombs set the midsection of the ship ablaze. With this damage and 223 casualties, Nashville was forced to return to Pearl Harbor and then to the Puget Sound Naval Shipyard in Bremerton, Washington, for repairs.

Robards served honorably during the war, but was not a recipient of the U.S. Navy Cross, contrary to what has been reported in numerous sources. The inaccurate story derives from a 1979 column by Hy Gardner. Aboard Nashville, Robards first found a copy of Eugene O'Neill's play Strange Interlude in the ship's library. Also while in the Navy, he first started thinking seriously about becoming an actor. He had emceed for a Navy band in Pearl Harbor, got a few laughs, and decided he liked it. His father suggested he enroll in the American Academy of Dramatic Arts (AADA) in New York City, from which he graduated in 1948. Robards left the Navy in 1946 as a Petty officer first class. He was awarded the Good Conduct Medal of the Navy, the American Defense Service Medal, the American Campaign Medal, the Asiatic–Pacific Campaign Medal, and the World War II Victory Medal.

== Career ==
=== 1947–1961: Theatre debut and breakthrough ===
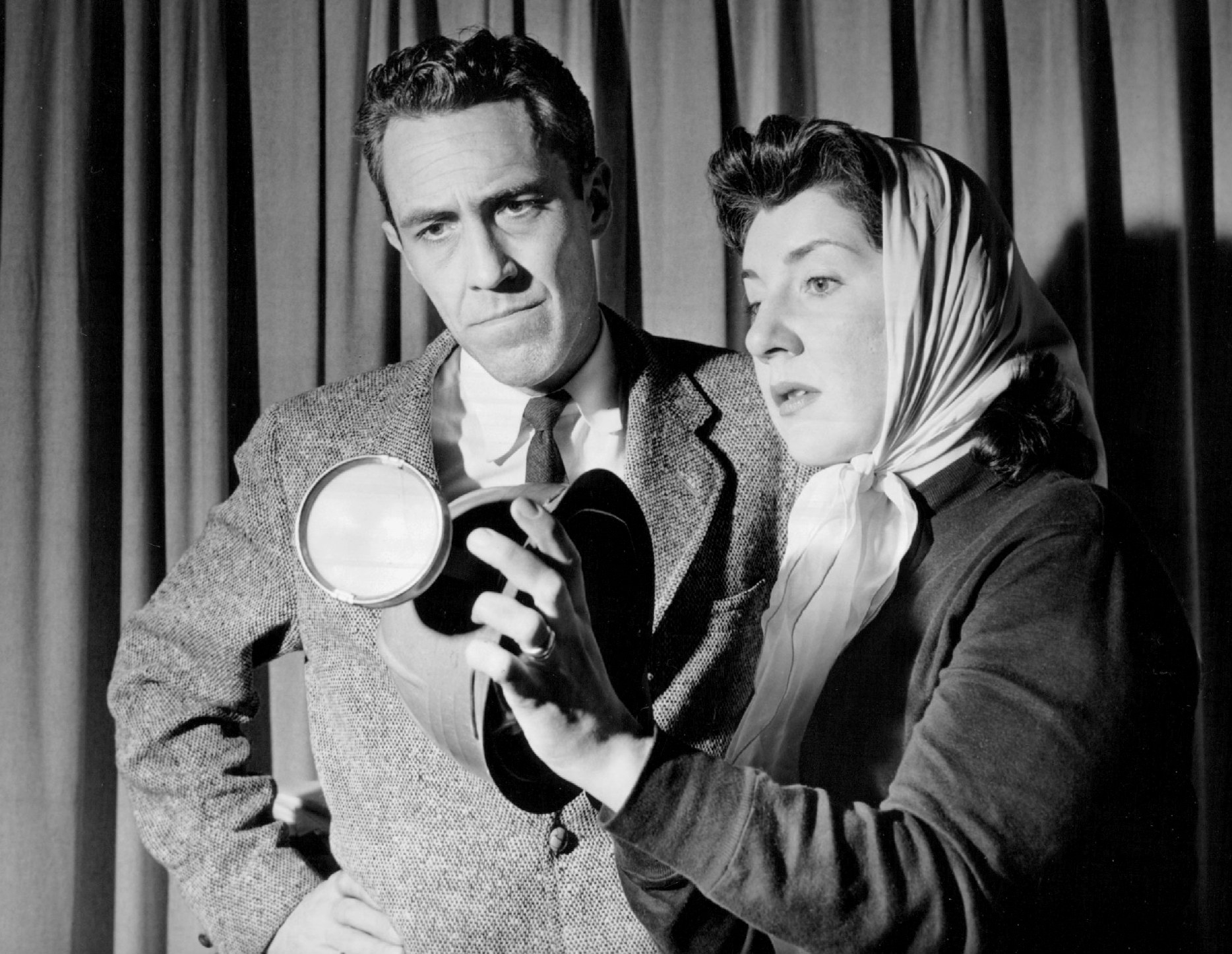
Robards and Maureen Stapleton in Toys in the Attic (Broadway, 1960)

Robards moved to New York City and began working on radio and stage. His first role was the 1947 short film Follow That Music. He made his Broadway debut in the popular hit Stalag 17, joining the cast during its run; Robards also worked as an assistant stage manager. In 1953 he appeared in American Gothic directed by Jose Quintero. Robards also began getting roles in some television dramas, such as episodes of The Magnavox Theatre, Mama, The Man Behind the Badge, The Big Story, Philco Television Playhouse (including Gore Vidal's "The Death of Billy the Kid"), Armstrong Circle Theatre, Appointment with Adventure, Justice, Star Tonight and Goodyear Playhouse.

Robards' big break was landing the starring role in José Quintero's 1956 off Broadway theatre revival production - and the later 1960 television film - of O'Neill's The Iceman Cometh, portraying the philosophical salesman Hickey; he won an Obie Award for his stage performance. He later portrayed Hickey again in another 1985 Broadway revival also staged by Quintero.

Robards originated the role of Jamie Tyrone Jr. in the original Broadway production of O'Neill's Pulitzer Prize- and Tony Award-winning Long Day's Journey into Night (1956), which was also directed by Quintero and ran for 390 performances. Robards appeared alongside Fredric March, Florence Eldridge and Bradford Dillman. Robards earned the Theatre World Award for his performance and was also nominated for the Tony Award for Best Featured Actor in a Play.

Robards continued to be busy on television, guest starring in The Alcoa Hour, Seven Lively Arts, Studio One and Omnibus.

After his Broadway success, Robards was invited to make his feature film debut in the Anatole Litvak directed drama The Journey (1959) starring Yul Brynner and Deborah Kerr.

He returned to Broadway acting in Budd Schulberg's play The Disenchanted, winning the Tony Award for Best Actor in a Play. It only had a short run but the Lillian Hellman play Toys in the Attic (1960), where Robards acted opposite Maureen Stapleton and Irene Worth, ran 456 performances. For the role he was nominated for the Tony Award for Best Actor in a Play.

Robards starred in the TV version of For Whom the Bell Tolls for Playhouse 90, Billy Budd for The Dupont Show of the Month, A Doll's House, and The Iceman Cometh.

In 1961 Robards starred in Big Fish, Little Fish by Hugh Wheeler directed by John Gielgud. This was followed by the enormously popular Broadway hit A Thousand Clowns (1962–63) by Herb Gardner. In Hollywood Robards appeared in two flop films, By Love Possessed (1961) and Tender is the Night (1962).

=== 1962–1980: Film stardom and acclaim ===
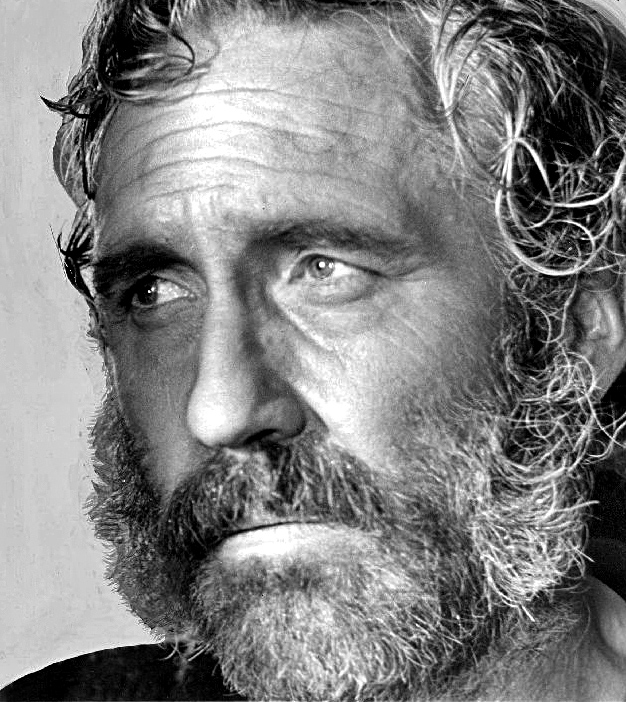
Robards in a publicity photo for Once Upon a Time in the West (1968)

He became a familiar face to movie audiences throughout the 1960s. He repeated his role in Long Day's Journey into Night in the 1962 film and played playwright George S. Kaufman in the film Act One (1963) based on the Moss Hart play of the same name. In the latter Robards acted alongside George Hamilton, George Segal, Jack Klugman and Eli Wallach.

Robards returned to Broadway to appear in two plays directed by Elia Kazan, Arthur Miller's After the Fall (1964) and S.N. Behrman's But For Whom Charlie (1964). Roberts was also in Eugene O'Neil's Hughie (1964) directed by Quintero

In films, Robards played Abe Lincoln in Illinois (1964) for television and Murray Burns in the comedy-drama A Thousand Clowns (1965) repeating his stage performance, for which he was nominated for the Golden Globe Award for Best Actor – Motion Picture Musical or Comedy. He was in two episodes of Bob Hope Presents the Chrysler Theatre including an adaptation of One Day in the Life of Ivan Denisovich.

His films included Big Hand for the Little Lady (1966), a comedy Western, and Any Wednesday (1966), an adaptation of a popular Broadway hit. Robards did Noon Wine (1966) for Sam Peckinpah on television, the film that revived Peckinpah's career. On Broadway he was in The Devils (1966), which only had a short run.

In 1967 Robards portrayed Doc Holliday in the western film Hour of the Gun and played Al Capone in The St. Valentine's Day Massacre. That same year he acted in Divorce American Style acting alongside Dick Van Dyke, Debbie Reynolds, Van Johnson, and Jean Simmons.

The following year he played Manuel "Cheyenne" Gutiérrez in the Sergio Leone western film Once Upon a Time in the West (1968). He acted opposite Henry Fonda, Charles Bronson, and Claudia Cardinale. That year he also acted in the William Friedkin directed musical comedy The Night They Raided Minsky's (1968) and the biographical drama Isadora.

Robards did The Strange Case of Dr Jekyll and Mr Hyde for television and on Broadway Robards was in We Bombed in New Haven (1968) a play by Joseph Heller.

Robards acted in the 1970 film Tora! Tora! Tora!, a depiction of the attack on Pearl Harbor on December 7, 1941, that led the United States into World War II. Robards played Brutus in Julius Caesar (1970) opposite Charlton Heston, did Rosolino Paternò, soldato... (1970) in Italy and played the lead in The Ballad of Cable Hogue (1970) for Peckinpah. Robards starred in Fools (1970), Johnny Got His Gun (1971), Murders in the Rue Morgue (1971) for AIP, and The War Between Men and Women (1972). On television he did The House Without a Christmas Tree (1972), The Thanksgiving Treasure and Old Faithful (1973).

Robards continued to appear on Broadway in revivals such as The Country Girl (1972) and A Moon for the Misbegotten (1973). He repeated his performance in Moon for television in 1975.

Robards had a small role in Peckinpah's Pat Garrett & Billy the Kid (1973). He was also in A Boy and His Dog (1975), The Easter Promise (1975), Mr. Sycamore (1975), and Addie and the King of Hearts (1976).

Robards appeared in two dramatizations based on the Watergate scandal; in 1976, he portrayed Washington Post executive editor Ben Bradlee in the film All the President's Men, based on the book by Carl Bernstein and Bob Woodward. He won the Academy Award for Best Supporting Actor, denying Network a chance to sweep all four acting categories (something only Humphrey Bogart had done previously). The next year, he played fictional president Richard Monckton (based on Richard Nixon) in the 1977 television miniseries Washington: Behind Closed Doors, based on John Ehrlichman's roman à clef The Company.

Robards was reunited with O'Neill and Quintero for A Touch of the Poet on stage in 1977. He was also in The Spy Who Never Was (1977), Julia (1977), Comes a Horseman (1978), A Christmas to Remember (1978), Hurricane (1979), Cabo Blanco (1980), Haywire (1980) (as Leland Hayward, F.D.R.: The Last Year (1980), Raise the Titanic (1980), Melvin and Howard (1980) (as Howard Hughes), and The Legend of the Lone Ranger (1981). On stage, Robards was in Hughie (1981). Robard's performance in Melvin and Howard earned him another Oscar nomination.

=== 1981–2000: Established actor and final roles ===
Robards had lead roles in Max Dugan Returns (1983) by Neil Simon and Something Wicked This Way Comes (1983) from the novel by Ray Bradbury. He played Dr. Russell Oakes in the 1983 television film The Day After.

In 1983 Robards appeared in a popular Broadway revival of You Can't Take It With You, a 1985 revival of The Iceman Cometh with Quintero and A Month of Sundays (1987) directed by Gene Saks. Robards appeared in the lead role of James Tyrone Sr., in a 1988 production of Long Day's Journey into Night directed by Quintero.

For television Robards did Sakharov (1984), The Atlanta Child Murders (1984), The Long Hot Summer (1985), Johnny Bull (1986), The Last Frontier (1986), Laguna Heat (1987), Breaking Home Ties (1987), Inherit the Wind (1988) and The Christmas Wife (1988). For films he made Square Dance (1987), Bright Lights, Big City (1988), and The Good Mother (1988). Robards also appeared onstage in a revival of O'Neill's Ah, Wilderness! (1988) directed by Arvin Brown, Love Letters (1990) with Colleen Dewhurst, Park Your Car in Harvard Yard (1991) by Israel Horovitz, as well as Harold Pinter's No Man's Land (1994).

In 1989 he acted in the Ron Howard directed comedy-drama Parenthood starring Steve Martin and Dianne Wiest and the British drama Reunion with a screenplay by Harold Pinter. That year he also acted in the comedy Dream a Little Dream and the psychological thriller Black Rainbow.

The following year he acted in the crime comedy Quick Change starring Bill Murray, Geena Davis, and Randy Quaid. On TV he did The Perfect Tribute (1991), Chernobyl: The Final Warning (1991), An Inconvenient Woman (1991), Mark Twain and Me (1991), and Heidi (1993). For films Robards was in Storyville (1992), The Adventures of Huck Finn (1992) and in 1993 he acted in Harold Pinter's British legal film The Trial opposite Kyle MacLachlan and Anthony Hopkins and the AIDS legal drama Philadelphia starring Tom Hanks and Denzel Washington.

Robards portrayed three presidents in films. He played Abraham Lincoln in the television films Abe Lincoln in Illinois (1964) and The Perfect Tribute (1991), and supplied the voice for the 1992 television documentary miniseries Lincoln. He also played the role of Ulysses S. Grant in The Legend of the Lone Ranger (1981) and supplied the Union General's voice in the PBS miniseries The Civil War (1990). He also played Franklin D. Roosevelt in F.D.R.: The Last Year (1980). Robards appeared in the documentary Empire of the Air: The Men Who Made Radio (1992).

Robards appeared in The Roots of Roe (1993), The Paper (1994), Little Big League (1994), The Enemy Within (1994), My Antonia (1995), Crimson Tide (1995), Journey (1995), A Thousand Acres (1997), Heartwood (1998), The Real Macaw (1998), and Beloved (1998) In 1995 Robards appeared on stage in Molly Sweeney. He played a congressman in Tony Scott's political thriller Enemy of the State starring Will Smith (1998). In his final film role, he played a cancer patient in the Paul Thomas Anderson directed drama Magnolia (1999). His last TV appearance was in Going Home (2000).

== Personal life ==
=== Marriages and family ===
Robards was married four times and had six children. With his first wife, Eleanor Pittman, Robards had three children, including Jason Robards III. His second marriage to actress Rachel Taylor lasted from April 1959 to May 1961. He and actress Lauren Bacall, his third wife, to whom he was married from 1961 to 1969, had a son, actor Sam Robards. Robards and Bacall divorced in part due to his alcoholism. Robards had two more children with his fourth wife, Lois O'Connor, and they remained married until his death.

=== Health problems and death ===
In 1972, Robards was seriously injured in an automobile crash when he drove his car into the side of a mountain on a winding California road, requiring extensive surgery and facial reconstruction. The crash may have been related to his alcoholism. Robards overcame his addiction and went on to publicly campaign for alcoholism awareness.

Robards was an American Civil War buff and scholar, an interest which informed his portrayal of the voice of Ulysses S. Grant in The Civil War series by filmmaker Ken Burns.

Robards was a resident of the Southport section of Fairfield, Connecticut. He died of lung cancer in Bridgeport, Connecticut, on December 26, 2000. His remains were buried at Oak Lawn Cemetery in Fairfield.

== Acting credits ==
=== Film ===
Year	Title	Role	Notes
1959	The Journey	Paul Kedes	
1961	By Love Possessed	Julius Penrose	
1962	Tender Is the Night	Dr. Richard "Dick" Diver	
1962	Long Day's Journey into Night	Jamie Tyrone	
1963	Act One	George S. Kaufman	
1965	A Thousand Clowns	Murray Burns	
1966	A Big Hand for the Little Lady	Henry Drummond	
1966	Any Wednesday	John Cleves	
1967	Divorce American Style	Nelson Downes	
1967	The St. Valentine's Day Massacre	Al Capone	
1967	Hour of the Gun	Doc Holliday	
1968	Isadora	Singer	
1968	Once Upon a Time in the West	Manuel "Cheyenne" Gutiérrez	
1968	The Night They Raided Minsky's	Raymond Paine	
1970	Rosolino Paternò, soldato…	Sam Armstrong	
1970	The Ballad of Cable Hogue	Cable Hogue	
1970	Julius Caesar	Marcus Junius Brutus	
1970	Tora! Tora! Tora!	Lt. Gen. Walter C. Short	
1970	Fools	Matthew South	
1971	Jud		
1971	Johnny Got His Gun	Joe's Father	
1971	Murders in the Rue Morgue	Cesar Charron	
1972	The War Between Men and Women	Stephen Kozlenko	
1973	Pat Garrett and Billy the Kid	Governor Wallace	
1975	A Boy and His Dog	Lou Craddock	
1975	Mr. Sycamore	John Gwilt	
1976	All the President's Men	Ben Bradlee	
1976	The Spy Who Never Was	Inspector Barkan	
1977	Julia	Dashiell Hammett	
1978	Comes a Horseman	Jacob "J.W." Ewing	
1979	Hurricane	Captain Bruckner	
1980	Cabo Blanco	Gunther Beckdorff	
1980	Raise the Titanic	Admiral James Sandecker	
1980	Melvin and Howard	Howard Hughes	
1981	The Legend of the Lone Ranger	Ulysses S. Grant	
1983	Max Dugan Returns	Max Dugan	
1983	Something Wicked This Way Comes	Charles Halloway	
1987	Square Dance	Dillard	
1988	Bright Lights, Big City	Mr. Hardy	Uncredited
1988	The Good Mother	Muth	
1989	Dream a Little Dream	Coleman Ettinger	
1989	Reunion	Harry Strauss	
1989	Parenthood	Frank Buckman	
1989	Black Rainbow	Walter Travis	
1990	Quick Change	Chief Rotzinger	
1992	Storyville	Clifford Fowler	
1993	The Adventures of Huck Finn	The King	
1993	The Trial	Doctor Huld	
1993	Philadelphia	Charles Wheeler	
1994	The Paper	Graham Keighley	
1994	The Enemy Within	General R. Pendleton Lloyd	
1994	Little Big League	Thomas Heywood	
1995	Crimson Tide	Rear Admiral Anderson	Uncredited
1997	A Thousand Acres	Larry Cook	
1998	The Real Macaw	Grandpa Girdis	
1998	Beloved	Mr. Bodwin	
1998	Enemy of the State	Congressman Phillip Hammersley	Uncredited
1998	Heartwood	Logan Reeser	
1999	Magnolia	Earl Partridge	

=== Television ===
Year	Title	Role	Notes
1951–1954	The Big Story	Mr. Simms; Aaron Dudley	Episode: "Arthur Mielke of the Washington Times Herald"; Episode: "Aaron Dudley, Reporter"
1955	The Philco Television Playhouse	Mason; Joe Grant	Episode: "The Outsiders"; Episode: "The Death of Billy the Kid"
1955	Star Tonight	Abraham Lincoln	Episode: "Flame and Ice"
1955–1956	Armstrong Circle Theatre	Paul Foster; Ralph Sawyer; Reinhardt Schmidt	Episode: "Man in Shadow"; Episode: "The Town That Refused to Die"; Episode: "Lost $2 Billion: The Story of Hurricane Diane"
1955–1956	Justice	Karder	Episode: "Pattern of Lies"; Episode: "Decision by Panic"
1956–1957	The Alcoa Hour	Jayson; Bert Palmer; Bridger	Episode: "Night"; Episode: "The Big Build-Up"; Episode: "Even the Weariest River"
1955–1957	Studio One in Hollywood	Prisoner; Leonard O'Brien; Cameron	Episode: "Twenty-Four Hours"; Episode: "The Incredible World of Horace Ford"; Episode: "A Picture in the Paper"
1958	Omnibus	Prime Minister	Episode: "Moment of Truth"
1959	Playhouse 90	Robert Jordan	Episode: "For Whom the Bell Tolls: Part 2"
1959	NBC Sunday Showcase	Alex Reed	Episode: "People Kill People Sometimes"
1959	A Doll's House	Dr. Rank	TV Movie
1960	Dow Hour of Great Mysteries	Detective Anderson	Episode: "The Bat" by Mary Roberts Rinehart
1960	The Play of the Week	Theodore 'Hickey' Hickman	Episode: "The Iceman Cometh"
1962	That's Where the Town is Going	Hobart Cramm	TV Movie
1964	Abe Lincoln in Illinois	Abraham Lincoln	TV Movie
1963–1966	Bob Hope Presents the Chrysler Theatre	Irish LaFontain; Ivan Denisovich	Episode: "Shipwrecked"; Episode: "One Day in the Life of Ivan Denisovich"
1966	ABC Stage 67	Royal Earle Thompson	Episode: "Noon Wine"
1969	Spoon River	Reader	TV Movie
1972	Circle of Fear	Elliot Brent	Episode: "The Dead We Leave Behind"
1972	The House Without a Christmas Tree	Jamie Mills	TV Movie
1973	The Thanksgiving Treasure	James Mills	TV Movie
1974	The Country Girl	Frank Elgin	TV Movie
1975	The Easter Promise	Jamie	TV Movie
1975	A Moon for the Misbegotten	James Tyrone Jr.	TV Special
1976	Addie and the King of Hearts	Jamie Mills	TV Movie
1977	Washington: Behind Closed Doors	President Richard Monckton	Miniseries; 6 episodes
1978	A Christmas to Remember	Daniel Larson	TV movie
1980	F.D.R.: The Last Year	President Franklin D. Roosevelt	TV movie
1980	Haywire	Leland Hayward	TV movie
1983	The Day After	Russell Oakes	TV Movie
1984	American Playhouse	Erie Smith	Episode: "Hughie"
1984	Sakharov	Andrei Sakharov	TV Movie
1984	Great Performances	Grandpa Martin Vanderhof	Episode: "You Can't Take It with You"
1985	The Atlanta Child Murders	Alvin Binder	2 episodes
1985	The Long Hot Summer	Will Varner	2 episodes
1986	Johnny Bull	Stephen Kovacs	TV Movie
1986	The Last Frontier	Ed Stenning	TV Movie
1987	Laguna Heat	Wade Shepard	TV Movie
1987	Breaking Home Ties	Lloyd	TV Movie
1988	Inherit the Wind	Henry Drummond	TV Movie
1988	The Christmas Wife	John Tanner	TV movie
1988	Thomas Hart Benton	Narrator	TV movie
1990	The Civil War	Ulysses S. Grant (voice)	Nine episodes
1991	The Perfect Tribute	Abraham Lincoln	TV Movie
1991	Chernobyl: The Final Warning	Armand Hammer	TV Movie
1991	An Inconvenient Woman	Jules Mendelson	2 episodes
1991	On the Waterways	Narrator	13 episodes
1991	Mark Twain and Me	Mark Twain	TV movie
1991–1997	American Experience	Narrator	7 episodes
1992	Lincoln	Abraham Lincoln	Voice; TV movie
1993	Heidi	Grandfather	Miniseries; 2 episodes
1994	The Enemy Within	General R. Pendleton Lloyd	TV Movie
1995	My Antonia	Josea Burden	TV Movie
1995	Journey	Marcus	TV Movie
2000	Going Home	Charles Barton	Final appearance

=== Theatre ===
Year	Production	Role	Venue	Ref.
1956–1958	Long Day's Journey into Night	James Tyrone Jr.	Helen Hayes Theatre, Broadway	
1958	Henry IV, Part 1	Hotspur	Stratford Shakespearean Festival	
1958	The Winter's Tale	Polixenes	Stratford Shakespearean Festival	
1958–1959	The Disenchanted	Manley Halliday	Coronet Theatre, Broadway	
1960–1961	Toys in the Attic	Julian Berniers	Hudson Theatre, Broadway	
1961	Big Fish, Little Fish	William Baker	ANTA Playhouse, Broadway	
1962–1963	A Thousand Clowns	Murray Burns	Eugene O'Neill Theatre, Broadway	
1964–1965	After the Fall	Quentin	ANTA Theatre, Broadway	
1964	But for Whom Charlie	Seymour Rosenthal	ANTA Theatre, Broadway	
1964–1965	Hughie	"Erie" Smith	Royale Theatre, Broadway	
1965–1966	The Devils	Urbain Grandier	Broadway Theatre, Broadway	
1968	We Bombed in New Haven	Captain Starkey	Ambassador Theatre, Broadway	
1972	The Country Girl	Frank Elgin	Billy Rose Theatre, Broadway	
1973–1974	A Moon for the Misbegotten	James Tyrone Jr.	Morosco Theatre, Broadway	
1977–1978	A Touch of the Poet	Cornelius Melody	Helen Hayes Theatre, Broadway	
1983–1984	You Can't Take It with You	Martin Vanderhof	Plymouth Theatre, Broadway	
1985	The Iceman Cometh	Theodore Hickman "Hickey"	Lunt-Fontanne Theatre, Broadway	
1987	A Month of Sundays	Cooper	Ritz Theatre, Broadway	
1988	Ah, Wilderness!	Nat Miller	Neil Simon Theatre, Broadway	
1988	Long Day's Journey into Night	James Tyrone	Neil Simon Theatre, Broadway	
1989–1990	Love Letters	Andrew Makepiece Ladd III	Edison Theatre, Broadway	
1991–1992	Park Your Car in Harvard Yard	Jacob Brackish	Music Box Theatre, Broadway	
1994	No Man's Land	Hirst	Criterion Center Stage, Broadway	

Source: "Jason Robards, Jr". Playbill Vault.

== Accolades and honors ==
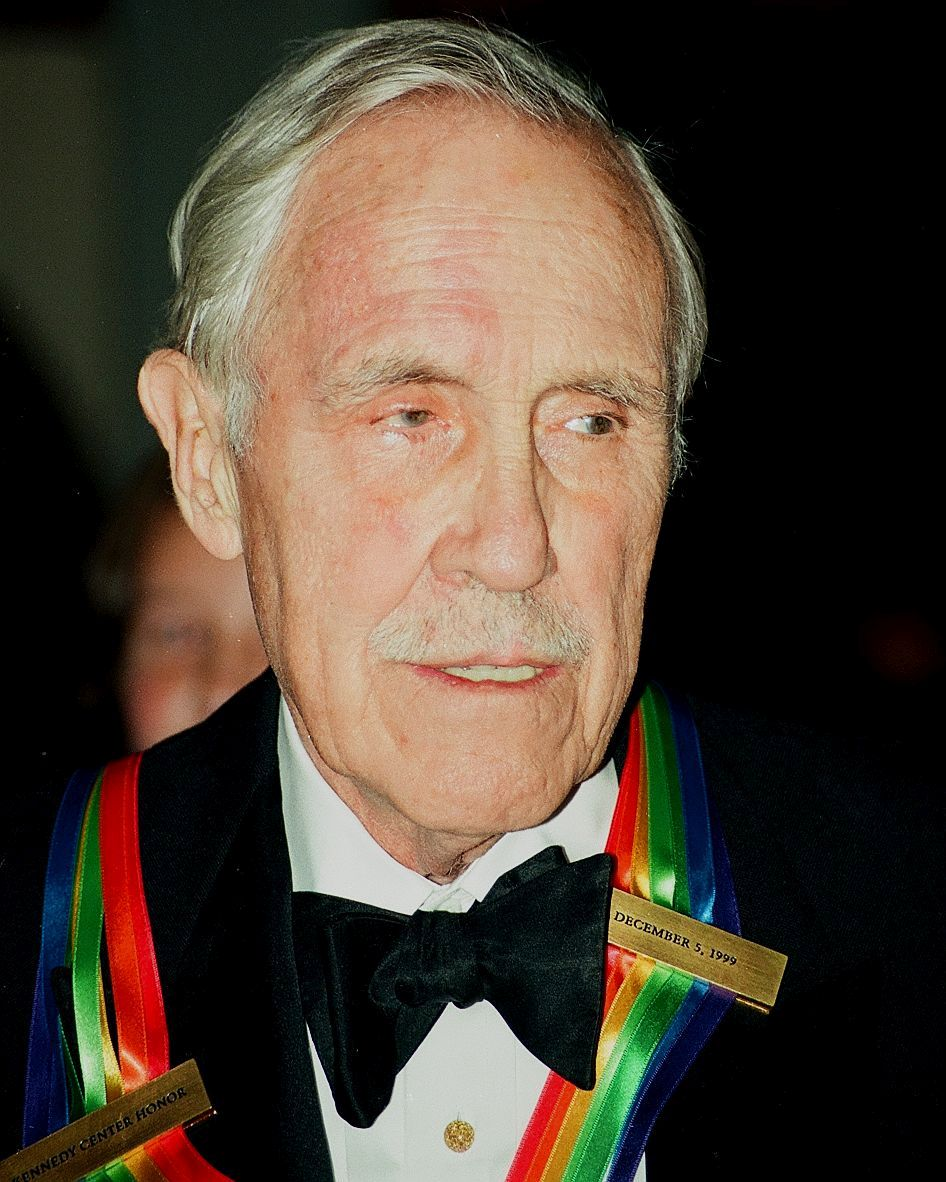
Robards in 1999, upon receiving the Kennedy Center Honors ribbon

Robards received eight Tony Award nominations, the second most nominations among male actors as of 2026. He won the Tony for Best Performance by a Leading Actor in a Play for his work in The Disenchanted (1959); this was also his only stage appearance with his father. He received the Academy Award for Best Supporting Actor in consecutive years: for All the President's Men (1976), portraying Washington Post editor Ben Bradlee, and for Julia (1977), portraying writer Dashiell Hammett. He was also nominated for another Academy Award for his role as Howard Hughes in Melvin and Howard (1980).

Robards received the Primetime Emmy Award for Outstanding Lead Actor in a Limited Series or Movie for his role in the television film Inherit the Wind (1988). In 1997, Robards received the U.S. National Medal of Arts, the highest honor conferred to an individual artist on behalf of the people. Recipients are selected by the U.S. National Endowment for the Arts and the medal is awarded by the President of the United States. In 1999, he was among the recipients at the Kennedy Center Honors, an annual honor given to those in the performing arts for their lifetime of contributions to American culture. In 2000, Robards received the first Monte Cristo Award, presented by the Eugene O'Neill Theater Center, and named after O'Neill's home. Subsequent recipients have included Edward Albee, Kevin Spacey, Wendy Wasserstein, and Christopher Plummer.

Robards narrated the public radio documentary, Schizophrenia: Voices of an Illness, produced by Lichtenstein Creative Media, which was awarded a 1994 George Foster Peabody Award for Excellence in Broadcasting. According to Time, Robards offered to narrate the schizophrenia program, saying that his first wife had been institutionalized for that illness. Robards is in the American Theater Hall of Fame, inducted in 1979. The Jason Robards Award was created by the Roundabout Theatre Company in New York City in his honor and his relationship with the theater.

=== Awards and nominations ===
Theatre Awards
Year	Association	Category	Project	Result	Ref.
1956	Theatre World Award		Long Day's Journey into Night	Won	
1956	Tony Award	Best Featured Actor in a Play	Long Day's Journey into Night	Nominated	
1959	Tony Award	Best Actor in a Play	The Disenchanted	Won	
1960	Tony Award	Best Actor in a Play	Toys in the Attic	Nominated	
1964	Tony Award	Best Actor in a Play	After the Fall	Nominated	
1965	Tony Award	Best Actor in a Play	Hughie	Nominated	
1972	Tony Award	Best Actor in a Play	The Country Girl	Nominated	
1974	Tony Award	Best Actor in a Play	A Moon for the Misbegotten	Nominated	
1978	Tony Award	Best Actor in a Play	A Touch of the Poet	Nominated	
Film Awards
1962	Cannes Film Festival	Best Actor	Long Day's Journey into Night	Won	
1962	National Board of Review	Best Actor	Long Day's Journey into Night	Won	
1965	Golden Globe Award	Best Actor – Motion Picture Musical or Comedy	A Thousand Clowns	Nominated	
1976	Academy Award	Best Supporting Actor	All the President's Men	Won	
1976	BAFTA Award	Best Supporting Actor	All the President's Men	Nominated	
1976	Golden Globe Award	Best Supporting Actor – Motion Picture	All the President's Men	Nominated	
1976	National Board of Review	Best Supporting Actor	All the President's Men	Won	
1976	National Society of Film Critics	Best Supporting Actor	All the President's Men	Won	
1976	New York Film Critics Circle	Best Supporting Actor	All the President's Men	Won	
1977	Academy Award	Best Supporting Actor	Julia	Won	
1977	BAFTA Award	Best Supporting Actor	Julia	Nominated	
1977	Golden Globe Award	Best Supporting Actor – Motion Picture	Julia	Nominated	
1977	Los Angeles Film Critics Association	Best Supporting Actor	Julia	Won	
1980	Academy Award	Best Supporting Actor	Melvin and Howard	Nominated	
1980	Golden Globe Award	Best Supporting Actor – Motion Picture	Melvin and Howard	Nominated	
1980	Boston Society of Film Critics	Best Supporting Actor	Melvin and Howard	Won	
1980	National Society of Film Critics	Best Supporting Actor	Melvin and Howard	3rd Place	
1980	New York Film Critics Circle	Best Supporting Actor	Melvin and Howard	2nd Place	
1999	Actor Award	Outstanding Cast in a Motion Picture	Magnolia	Nominated	
1999	Florida Film Critics Circle	Best Cast	Magnolia	Won	
Television Awards
1964	Primetime Emmy Award	Outstanding Single Performance by an Actor in a Leading Role	Abe Lincoln in Illinois	Nominated	
1975	Primetime Emmy Award	Outstanding Lead Actor in a Drama or Comedy Special	A Moon for the Misbegotten	Nominated	
1977	Primetime Emmy Award	Outstanding Lead Actor in a Limited Series	Washington: Behind Closed Doors	Nominated	
1980	Primetime Emmy Award	Outstanding Lead Actor in a Limited Series or a Special	F.D.R.: The Last Year	Nominated	
1984	Golden Globe Award	Best Actor – Miniseries or Television Film	Sakharov	Nominated	
1988	Primetime Emmy Award	Outstanding Lead Actor in a Miniseries or a Special	Inherit the Wind	Won	

=== Military awards ===

1st Row	Navy Good Conduct Medal		American Defense Service Medal
2nd Row	American Campaign Medal	Asiatic-Pacific Campaign Medal	World War II Victory Medal
