= The Company (Ehrlichman novel) =

1976 novel by John Ehrlichman

- First edition
- Author: John Ehrlichman
- Language: English
- Genre: Political fiction
- Publisher: Simon & Schuster
- Publication date: 1976
- Publication place: United States
- Media type: Print (hardback)

The Company is a political fiction roman à clef novel written by John Ehrlichman, a former close aide to President Richard Nixon and a figure in the Watergate scandal, first published in 1976 by Simon & Schuster. The title is an insider nickname for the Central Intelligence Agency. The plot is loosely based on events leading up to the Watergate coverup, centered on Nixon administration attempts to cover up its own illegal activity and that of the CIA dating back to the Kennedy administration. Although all characters are fictional, most are based on real-life political figures, and journalists such as columnist Jack Anderson.

The book was critical of Nixon depicting the fictional president Monckton as a paranoid alcoholic, but places the blame for his downfall as the result of CIA conspiracy.

== Plot summary ==
The protagonist is Director of Central Intelligence (DCI) William "Bill" Martin, a longtime CIA agent who was appointed DCI by Democratic President Esker Scott Anderson. Anderson, as vice president, succeeded William Curry, who was killed in a crash of Air Force One in the early 1960s. Martin's friendship with Anderson dates from the 1950s, when he was a lower-level agent and Anderson held a great deal of power as Senate Majority Leader.

As Deputy CIA Director, Martin was responsible for planning an undercover invasion of the Dominican Republic by emigres trained and supported by the U.S. However, President Curry, worried about negative repercussions from the invasion, ordered the murder of a priest who led the rebel movement, in order to ensure the invasion's failure. CIA Inspector General, Major-General Antonio Primula, wrote a report blaming Martin, then-DCI Horace McFall and, in part, President Curry for the invasion's failure, and recommending the firing of McFall and Martin. After Curry's death, Anderson appointed Martin as DCI and promised to keep the Primula report secret, in return for Martin's loyalty.

Anderson becomes seriously ill during his elected term and declines to run for a second, leaving his Vice President Ed Gilley as the Democratic nominee. Despite Martin's hard work behind the scenes to help elect Gilley, he is defeated by Republican Richard Monckton. Martin sees Monckton, a longtime political enemy of Curry and Anderson, as a threat to himself and the CIA.

But Martin retains his position, due mainly to the support of Monckton's National Security Advisor Carl Tessler, a former foreign affairs aide to Governor Thomas J. Forville. Despite his relatively weak position in the new administration, Martin discovers illegal practices of Monckton administration operatives, and uses this knowledge to make a deal with Monckton: he must destroy the Primula Report and assign Martin as ambassador to Jamaica in exchange for Martin's silence on Monckton's illegal activity.

Despite Martin's efforts, Monckton's activities are revealed by an investigative reporter, initiating the fall of his administration.

== Key to real-life inspirations ==
- Director of Central Intelligence William Martin - DCI Richard Helms
- President Richard "Dick" Monckton of Illinois - President Richard Nixon of California
- President Esker Scott "ESA" Anderson of Oregon - President Lyndon B. Johnson of Texas
- President William Arthur "Bill" Curry of New York - President John F. Kennedy of Massachusetts
- Vice President Edward Miller "Ed" Gilley of Pennsylvania - Vice President Hubert Humphrey of Minnesota
- Secretary of the Treasury Myron Dunn - John N. Mitchell
- Governor Thomas J. Froville of New Jersey - Governor Nelson Rockefeller of New York
- National Security Advisor Dr. Carl Tessler - National Security Advisor Dr. Henry Kissinger
- President's Monckton Aide Frank Flaherty - White House Chief of Staff H. R. Haldeman
- FBI Director Elmer Morse - FBI Director J. Edgar Hoover
- Walter Tulloch - G. Gordon Liddy
- Roger Castle - Jeb Magruder

== Release ==
The initial by publisher Simon & Schuster was 50,000 copies It made the best-seller lists upon its release and then returned a year later when the television mini-series was released. Reviews were positive on the quality of Ehrlichman's writing and the vivid depiction of life within the White House.

== Television adaptation ==
In 1977, ABC television broadcast a six-part mini-series adaptation of the book, titled Washington: Behind Closed Doors, starring Cliff Robertson as William Martin, Jason Robards as President Monkton, Andy Griffith as President Anderson, Robert Vaughn as Frank Flaherty, and Harold Gould as Carl Tessler. The mini-series was produced by Paramount Television.
