= Dead Reckoning (1990 film) =

- Genre: Thriller
- Teleplay by: Neill D. Hicks; Andie McCuaig
- Directed by: Robert Michael Lewis
- Starring: Cliff Robertson; Rick Springfield; Susan Blakely
- Music by: Mark Snow
- Country of origin: United States
- Original language: English

Production
- Executive producer: Barry J. Weitz
- Producer: Robert Michael Lewis
- Cinematography: Richard Leiterman
- Editor: Les Green
- Running time: 100 minutes
- Production company: Houston Lady Productions

Original release
- Release: May 23, 1990

Dead Reckoning is a 1990 television film, directed by Robert Michael Lewis, starring Cliff Robertson, Rick Springfield, and Susan Blakely. The film score was composed by Mark Snow. The film was featured on USA Up All Night.

== Plot ==
The central character, a doctor, finds his life at stake on an island with his wife and her lover.

== Cast ==
- Cliff Robertson: Daniel Barnard
- Rick Springfield: Kyle Rath
- Susan Blakely: Alex Barnard
- Linda Darlow: Chi Chi
- Michael MacRae: Sheriff
