= Cliff Robertson =

American actor (1923–2011)

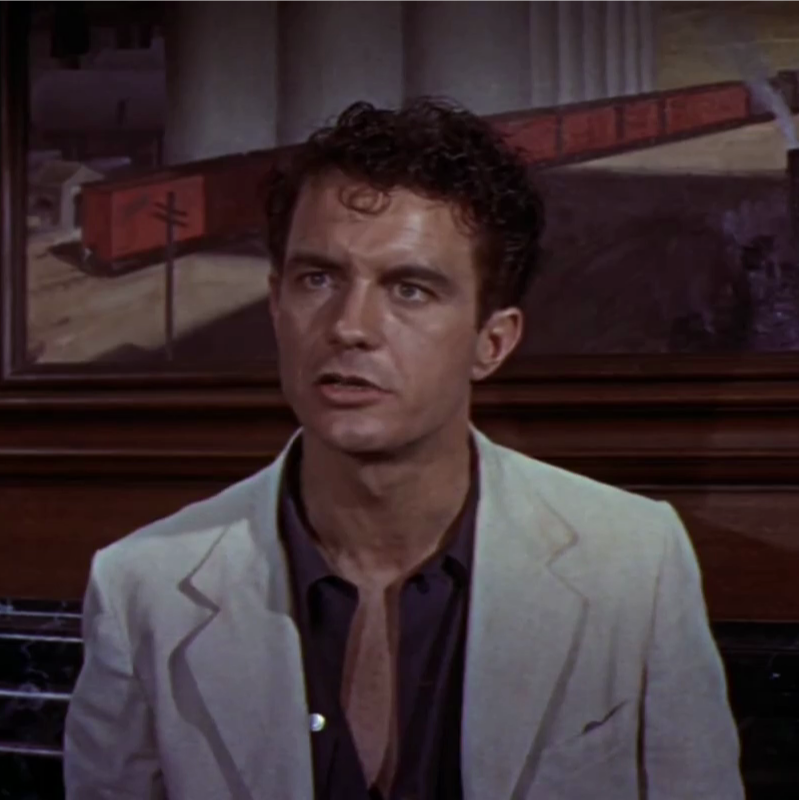
- Robertson in the trailer for Picnic (1955)
- Born: Clifford Parker Robertson III; September 9, 1923; San Diego, California, U.S.
- Died: September 10, 2011 (aged 88); Stony Brook, New York, U.S.
- Resting place: Cedar Lawn Cemetery, East Hampton, New York, U.S.
- Education: La Jolla High School; Antioch College
- Occupation: Actor
- Years active: 1943–2007
- Political party: Democratic
- Spouses: Cynthia Stone (m. 1957; div. 1959) Dina Merrill (m. 1966; div. 1989)
- Children: 2

Clifford Parker Robertson III (September 9, 1923 – September 10, 2011) was an American actor whose career in film and television spanned over six decades. Robertson portrayed a young John F. Kennedy in the 1963 film PT 109, and won the 1968 Academy Award for Best Actor for his role in the film Charly.

On television, Robertson portrayed retired astronaut Buzz Aldrin in the 1976 TV film adaptation of Aldrin's autobiographic Return to Earth, played a fictional character based on Director of Central Intelligence Richard Helms in the 1977 miniseries Washington: Behind Closed Doors, and portrayed Henry Ford in Ford: The Man and the Machine (1987). His last well-known film appearances were as Uncle Ben in the 2002–2007 Spider-Man film trilogy.

Robertson was an accomplished aviator who served as the founding chairman of the Experimental Aircraft Association (EAA)'s Young Eagles Program at its inception in the early 1990s. It became the most successful aviation youth advocacy program in history.

== Early life and education ==
Robertson was born in La Jolla, California, the son of Clifford Parker Robertson Jr. (1902–1968) and his first wife, Audrey Olga Robertson (née Willingham; 1903–1925). (Note: Several obituaries have stated that Robertson was adopted by his parents. However, the California Birth Index of 1905–1995 states that Clifford P. Robertson was born to a mother whose maiden name was Willingham, in Los Angeles County, California, on September 9, 1923. He was adopted by his maternal grandmother upon his mother's death.) His Texas-born father was described as "the idle heir to a tidy sum of ranching money". Robertson once said, "[My father] was a very romantic figure – tall, handsome. He married four or five times, and between marriages he'd pop in to see me. He was a great raconteur, and he was always surrounded by sycophants who let him pick up the tab. During the Great Depression, he tapped the trust for $500,000, and six months later he was back for more."

Robertson's parents divorced when he was one, and his mother died of peritonitis a year later in El Paso, Texas, at the age of 21. He was raised by his maternal grandmother, Mary Eleanor "Eleanora" Willingham (née Sawyer, 1875–1957), in California, and rarely saw his father. He graduated in 1941 from La Jolla High School, where he was known as "The Walking Phoenix".

He served as a third mate in the U.S. Merchant Marine during World War II, before attending Antioch College in Yellow Springs, Ohio, and dropping out to work for a short time as a journalist.

== Career ==
Robertson studied at the Actors Studio, becoming a life member. In the early 1950s he worked steadily in television, including a stint as the lead of Rod Brown of the Rocket Rangers (1953–1954). He appeared in Broadway in Late Love (1953–1954) and The Wisteria Trees (1955), the latter written by Joshua Logan.

=== Columbia ===
Robertson made his film debut in Picnic (1955), directed by Logan. Robertson played the role of William Holden's best friend – a part originated on stage by Paul Newman. Newman was under contract to Warner Bros. when the film was being made and was then considered too big a star to reprise his stage performance. Logan's wife recommended Robertson after seeing him in a revival of The Wisteria Trees, and the director remembered him from a Chicago production of Mister Roberts.

The film was a box office success and Robertson was promoted to Joan Crawford's co-star in Autumn Leaves (1956), also at Columbia Pictures, playing her mentally unstable younger lover. This meant he had to pass up the chance to replace Ben Gazzara on Broadway in Cat on a Hot Tin Roof. However he did return to Broadway to appear in Orpheus Descending by Tennessee Williams, which only had a short run.

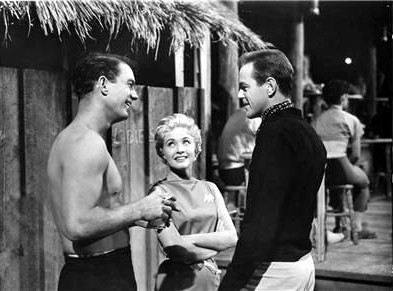
Robertson, Jane Powell, and Keith Andes in the 1958 film, The Girl Most Likely

Robertson went to RKO to make two films: The Naked and the Dead (1958), an adaptation of the famous novel, co-starring Aldo Ray; and The Girl Most Likely (1958), a musical – the last film made by RKO Studios. Robertson received superb reviews for Days of Wine and Roses on TV with Piper Laurie.

He was in Columbia's Gidget (1959), appearing opposite Sandra Dee as the Big Kahuna. It was popular and led to two sequels, neither of which Robertson appeared in. Less successful was a war film at Columbia, Battle of the Coral Sea (1959).

In 1961, he was the third lead in Paramount's All in a Night's Work, starred in Samuel Fuller's Underworld U.S.A. at Columbia, and supported Esther Williams in The Big Show. He had his first film hit since Gidget with Columbia's The Interns (1962) which was a big hit. After supporting Debbie Reynolds in My Six Loves (1963), Robertson was President John F. Kennedy's personal choice to play him in 1963's PT 109. The film was not a success at the box office.

More popular was Sunday in New York (1963), where Robertson supported Rod Taylor and Jane Fonda, and The Best Man where he was a ruthless presidential candidate. Filmink said the film "reminded everyone what a good actor he could be." Robertson appeared in a popular war film 633 Squadron (1964) then supported Lana Turner in a melodrama, Love Has Many Faces (1965). In 1965 he said his contract with Columbia was for one film a year.

=== Charly ===
In 1961, Robertson played the lead role in a United States Steel Hour television production titled "The Two Worlds of Charlie Gordon", based on the novel Flowers for Algernon by Daniel Keyes. Frustrated at the progress of his career, Robertson optioned the rights to the teleplay and hired William Goldman to write a script. Before Goldman completed his work, Robertson arranged for Goldman to be hired to Americanize the dialogue for Masquerade (1965), a spy spoof which Robertson starred in, replacing Rex Harrison.

Robertson then made a war film, Up from the Beach (1965) for Fox and guest-starred on that studio's TV show, Batman (1966). He co-starred with Harrison in The Honey Pot (1967) for Joseph L. Mankiewicz then appeared in another war film, The Devil's Brigade (1968) with William Holden.

Robertson disliked Goldman's Algernon script and replaced the writer with Stirling Silliphant for what became Charly (1968). The film was another box office success and Robertson won the 1968 Academy Award for Best Actor for his portrayal of a mentally challenged man. The movie was also a financial success.

=== Stardom ===
Charly was made by ABC Pictures, which insisted that Robert Aldrich use Robertson in Too Late the Hero (1970), a war film with Michael Caine that was a disappointment at the box office. Robertson turned down roles in The Anderson Tapes, Straw Dogs (before Peckinpah was involved), and Dirty Harry. Instead Robertson co-wrote, starred in, and directed J. W. Coop (1971), another commercial disappointment despite excellent reviews.

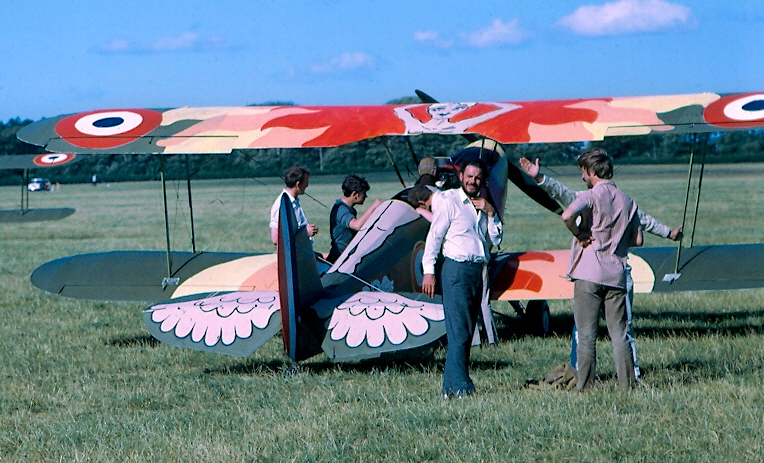
Lynn Garrison's Stampe-Vertongen SV.4 painted for a Robertson film project, Weston, Ireland, 1969

Looking back on his career, Robertson said: "nobody made more mediocre movies than I did. Nobody ever did such a wide variety of mediocrity".

In 1969, immediately after winning the Academy Award for Charly, Robertson, a lifelong aviation enthusiast, attempted to produce and direct an aviation film, I Shot Down the Red Baron, I Think, featuring World War I aerial combat, using Lynn Garrison's Irish aviation facility. The comedic storyline portrayed the Red Baron as gay. The aircraft featured garish paint schemes. The film was never completed or released.

Robertson played Cole Younger in The Great Northfield, Minnesota Raid (1972) and a pilot in Ace Eli and Rodger of the Skies (1973). He appeared in the 1974 thriller Man on a Swing and the 1975 British drama Out of Season.

=== Later career ===
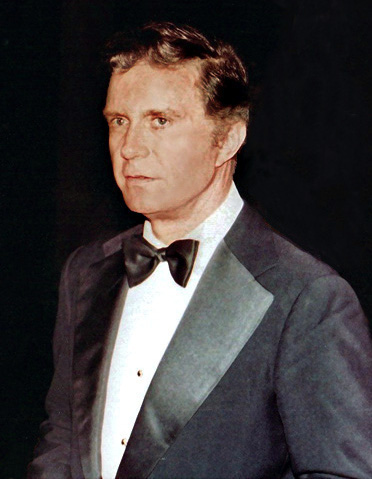
Robertson in 1981

Robertson returned to supporting parts in Three Days of the Condor (1975), which was a big hit. He played the lead in Obsession (1976), a popular thriller from Brian De Palma and Paul Schrader, and in the Canadian drama Shoot (1976). He was also one of several stars in Midway (1976).

Robertson turned to television for Washington: Behind Closed Doors (1977), then had the lead in a thriller, Dominique (1978). He returned to directing for The Pilot (1980), also playing the title role, an alcoholic flyer. Robertson played Hugh Hefner in Star 80 (1983). He attempted to make Charly II in 1980 but it did not happen.

From the 1980s and 1990s onwards, Robertson was predominantly a character actor. He played villains in Class (1983) and Brainstorm (1983). He did have the lead in Shaker Run (1985) in New Zealand, and Dreams of Gold: The Mel Fisher Story (1986) on TV.

In addition, he served as the company spokesperson for AT&T from 1983 to 1992 and appeared in various commercials for their long-distance service and consumer telephones.

He was a villain in Malone (1987), did Dead Reckoning (1990) on TV and supported in Wild Hearts Can't Be Broken (1991), Wind (1992), Renaissance Man (1994) and John Carpenter's Escape from L.A. (1996).

Late in his life, Robertson's career had a resurgence. He appeared as Uncle Ben Parker in Sam Raimi's Spider-Man (2002), as well as in the sequels Spider-Man 2 (2004) and Spider-Man 3 (2007; his last acting role). He commented on his website: "Since Spider-Man 1 and 2, I seem to have a whole new generation of fans. That in itself is a fine residual." He also starred in and wrote 13th Child (2002) and appeared in Riding the Bullet (2004), both horror films.

In 1989, he was a member of the jury at the 39th Berlin International Film Festival.

=== Television ===
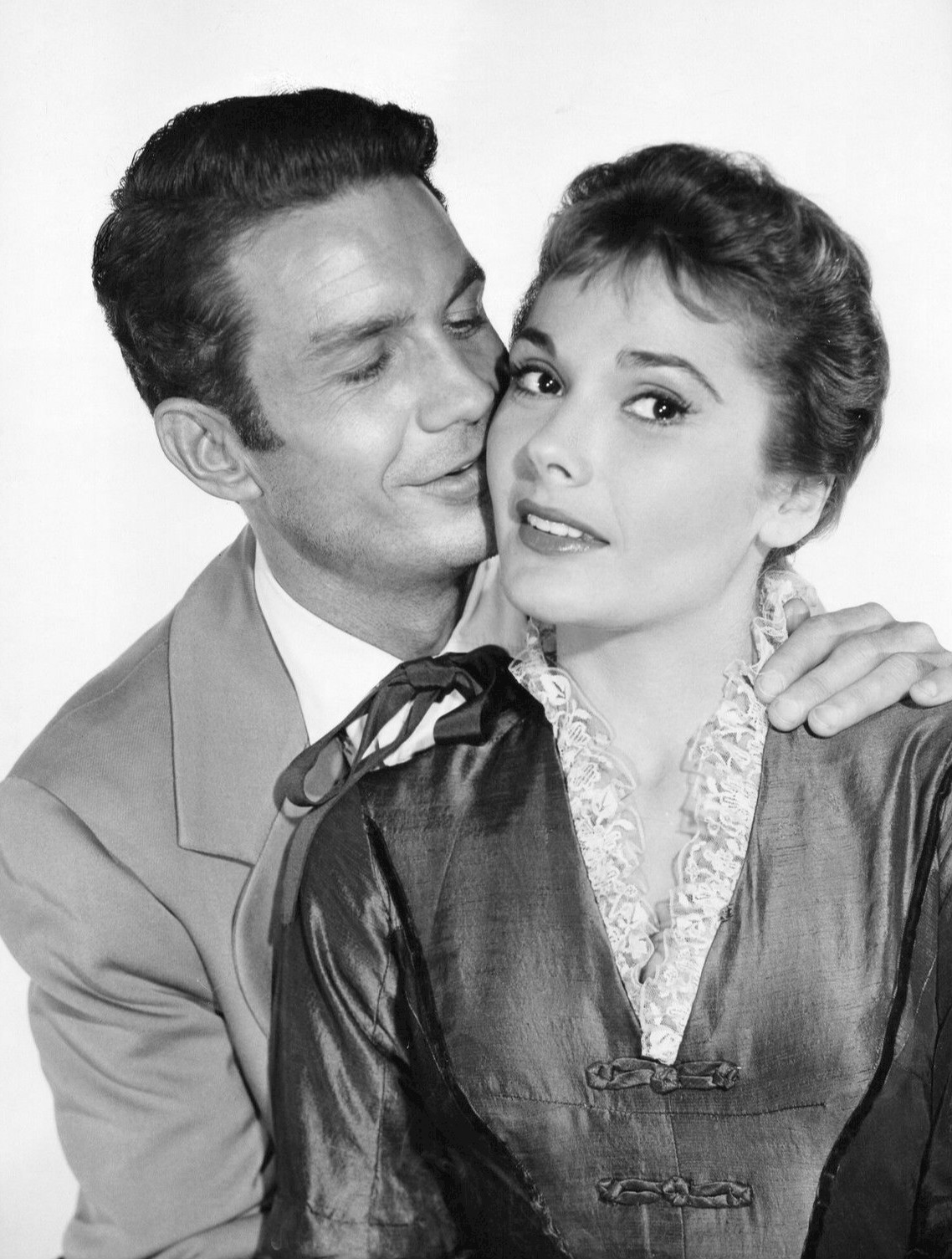
Robertson and Felicia Farr in the Playhouse 90 presentation of "Natchez"

Robertson's early television appearances included a starring role in the live space opera Rod Brown of the Rocket Rangers (1953–1954), as well as recurring roles on Hallmark Hall of Fame (1952), Alcoa Theatre (1959), and Playhouse 90 (1958, 1960), Outlaws (three episodes). Robertson also appeared as a special guest star on Wagon Train for one episode, portraying an Irish immigrant.

In 1958, Robertson portrayed Joe Clay in the first broadcast of Playhouse 90's Days of Wine and Roses. In 1960, he was cast as Martinus Van Der Brig, a con man, in the episode "End of a Dream" of Riverboat.

Other appearances included: "Wagon Train" (1958), The Twilight Zone episodes "A Hundred Yards Over the Rim" (1961) and "The Dummy" (1962), followed by The Eleventh Hour in the 1963 episode "The Man Who Came Home Late". He guest-starred on such television series as The Greatest Show on Earth, Breaking Point and ABC Stage 67. He had starring roles in episodes of both the 1960s and 1990s versions of The Outer Limits, including "The Galaxy Being", the first episode of the original series. He was awarded an Emmy for his leading role in a 1965 episode, "The Game" of Bob Hope Presents the Chrysler Theatre. He appeared as a villain on five episodes of ABC's Batman series as the gunfighter "Shame" (1966 and 1968), the second time with his wife, Dina Merrill, as "Calamity Jan".

In 1976, he portrayed a retired Buzz Aldrin in an adaptation of Aldrin's autobiography Return to Earth. The next year, he portrayed a fictional Director of Central Intelligence (based on Richard Helms) in Washington: Behind Closed Doors, an adaptation of John Ehrlichman's roman à clef The Company, in turn based on the Watergate scandal. In 1987, he portrayed Henry Ford in Ford: The Man and The Machine. From 1983 to 1984, he played Dr. Michael Ranson in Falcon Crest.

== Columbia Pictures embezzlement scandal ==
In 1977, Robertson discovered that his signature had been forged on a $10,000 check payable to him, although it was for work he had not performed. He also learned that the forgery had been carried out by then-Columbia Pictures head David Begelman. On reporting it, Robertson inadvertently triggered one of the biggest Hollywood scandals of the 1970s. Begelman was charged with embezzlement, convicted, and later fired from Columbia. Despite pressure to remain quiet, Robertson and his wife Dina Merrill spoke to the press. As a result of coming forward with the scandal, the studio blacklisted him and refused to make another film with him in it until 2002's Spider-Man.

He finally returned to studio film five years later, starring in Brainstorm (1983). The story of the scandal is told in David McClintick's 1982 bestseller, Indecent Exposure.

== Personal life ==
In 1957, Robertson married actress Cynthia Stone, the former wife of actor Jack Lemmon. They had a daughter, Stephanie, before divorcing in 1959; he also had a stepson, Chris Lemmon, by this marriage. In 1966, he married actress and Post Cereals heiress Dina Merrill, the former wife of Stanley M. Rumbough Jr.; they had a daughter, Heather (1968–2007), before divorcing. He resided in Water Mill, New York.

Robertson was a Democrat and supported Arizona congressman Morris K. Udall during the 1976 Democratic presidential primaries.

=== Aviation ===
A certified private pilot, one of Robertson's main hobbies was flying and, among other aircraft, he owned several de Havilland Tiger Moths, a Messerschmitt Bf 108, and a genuine World War II–era Mk. IX Supermarine Spitfire (MK923). His first plane flight was in a Lockheed Model 9 Orion. As a 13-year-old, he cleaned hangars for airplane rides. He met Paul Mantz, Art Scholl, and Charles Lindbergh while flying at local California airports. His piloting skills helped him get the part as the Wing Commander in the British war film 633 Squadron. He entered balloon races, including one in 1964 from the mainland to Catalina Island that ended with him being rescued from the Pacific Ocean. He was also a glider pilot and owned a Grob Astir.

In 1969, during the civil war conflict in Nigeria, Robertson helped organize an effort to fly food and medical supplies into the area. He also organized flights of supplies to the ravaged country of Ethiopia when it experienced famine in 1978.

Robertson was flying a private Beechcraft Baron over New York City on the morning of September 11, 2001, two days after his 78th birthday. He was directly above the World Trade Center, climbing through 7,500 feet when the first Boeing 767 struck. He was instructed by air traffic control to land immediately at the nearest airport after a nationwide order to ground all civilian and commercial aircraft following the attacks.

==== Young Eagles ====
He was a longtime member of the Experimental Aircraft Association (EAA), working his way through the ranks in prominence and eventually co-founding the Young Eagles Program with EAA president Tom Poberezny. Robertson chaired the program from its 1992 inception to 1994 (succeeded by former test pilot Chuck Yeager). Along with educating youth about aviation, the initial goal of the Young Eagles was to fly one million children (many of them never having flown before) prior to the 100th Anniversary of Flight celebration on December 17, 2003. That goal was achieved on November 13, 2003. On July 28, 2016, the two millionth Young Eagle was flown by actor Harrison Ford. Within the EAA, he also founded the Cliff Robertson Work Experience in 1993, which offers youths the chance to work for flight and ground school instruction.

== Death ==
On September 10, 2011, one day after his 88th birthday, Robertson died of natural causes in Stony Brook, New York. A private funeral was held at St. Luke's Episcopal Church in East Hampton, New York, and his remains were interred at the Cedar Lawn Cemetery.

== Filmography ==
=== Film ===
Year	Title	Role	Director(s)	Notes
1943	We've Never Been Licked	Adams	John Rawlins	World War II propaganda film Uncredited
1943	Corvette K-225	Lookout	Richard Rosson; Howard Hawks	War film Uncredited
1955	Picnic	Alan Benson	Joshua Logan	Romantic comedy-drama film
1956	Autumn Leaves	Burt Hanson	Robert Aldrich	Psychological drama film
1958	The Naked and the Dead	Lieutenant Robert Hearn	Raoul Walsh	War film Based on the novel of the same name by Norman Mailer
1958	The Girl Most Likely	Pete	Mitchell Leisen	Musical comedy film Last film made by RKO Studios
1959	Gidget	'The Big Kahuna'	Paul Wendkos	Comedy film Made using CinemaScope
1959	Battle of the Coral Sea	Lieutenant Commander Jeff Conway	Paul Wendkos	War film
1959	As the Sea Rages	Clements	Horst Hächler	Drama film Also known as Raubfischer in Hellas
1961	All in a Night's Work	Warren Kingsley Jr.	Joseph Anthony	Romantic screwball comedy film Made in Technicolor
1961	Underworld U.S.A.	'Tolly' Devlin	Samuel Fuller	Neo-noir film
1961	The Big Show	Josef Everard	James B. Clark	Drama film Based on the 1941 novel I'll Never Go There Any More by Jerome Weidman
1962	The Interns	Dr. John Paul Otis	David Swift	Drama film
1963	My Six Loves	Reverend Jim Larkin	Gower Champion	Comedy film Filmed in Technicolor
1963	PT 109	Lt. (j.g.) John F. Kennedy	Leslie H. Martinson; Lewis Milestone	Biographical war film Based on John F. Kennedy in World War II by Robert J. Donovan
1963	Sunday in New York	Adam Tyler	Peter Tewksbury	Romantic comedy film Based on the 1961 play of the same name by Norman Krasna
1964	The Best Man	Joe Cantwell	Franklin J. Schaffner	Political drama film Based on the 1960 play of the same name by Gore Vidal
1964	The Wandering Wind	Self	George Bookasta	Short film
1964	633 Squadron	Wing Commander Roy Grant	Walter Grauman	War film Based on the 1956 novel of the same name by Frederick E. Smith
1965	Love Has Many Faces	Pete Jordon	Alexander Singer	Drama film
1965	Masquerade	David Frazer	Basil Dearden	Comedy thriller film Based on the 1954 novel Castle Minerva by Victor Canning
1965	Up from the Beach	Sergeant Edward Baxter	Robert Parrish	War film Based on the 1958 novel Epitaph for an Enemy by George Barr
1967	The Honey Pot	William McFly	Joseph L. Mankiewicz	Crime comedy-drama film
1968	The Devil's Brigade	Major Alan Crown	David L. Wolper	War film Filmed in DeLuxe Color; Based on the 1966 book of the same name co-written by American novelist and historian Robert H. Adleman and Col. George Walton
1968	Charly	Charly Gordon	Ralph Nelson	Science fiction drama film Based on the 1966 novel Flowers for Algernon by Daniel Keyes; Academy Award for Best Actor; National Board of Review Award for Best Actor; Nominated—Golden Globe Award for Best Actor – Motion Picture Drama; Nominated—Laurel Award for Best Male Dramatic Performance
1970	Too Late the Hero	Lieutenant Sam Lawson	Robert Aldrich	War film
1971	J. W. Coop	J. W. Coop	Cliff Robertson	Western film co-producer and co-writer
1972	The Great Northfield, Minnesota Raid	Cole Younger	Philip Kaufman	Western film
1973	The Men Who Made the Movies: Alfred Hitchcock	Narrator	Richard Schickel	Biographical documentary film
1973	Ace Eli and Rodger of the Skies	Eli 'Ace' Walford	John Erman	Adventure comedy film
1974	Man on a Swing	Lee Tucker	Frank Perry	Thriller film
1975	Out of Season	Joe Tanner	Alan Bridges	Drama film Entered into the 25th Berlin International Film Festival
1975	Three Days of the Condor	J. Higgins	Sydney Pollack	Spy thriller film Based on the 1974 novel Six Days of the Condor by James Grady
1976	Shoot	Rex	Harvey Hart	Action film Based on the novel of the same name by Douglas Fairbairn.
1976	Midway	Commander Carl Jessop	Jack Smight	War film
1976	Obsession	Michael Courtland	Brian De Palma	Psychological thriller film
1977	Fraternity Row	Narrator	Thomas J. Tobin	Drama film
1979	Dominique	David Ballard	Michael Anderson	Psychological horror film
1979	The Little Prince	Narrator	Will Vinton	Short animated film
1980	The Pilot	Mike Hagan	Cliff Robertson	Action drama film
1983	Star 80	Hugh Hefner	Bob Fosse	Biographical crime drama film
1983	Class	Mr. Burroughs	Lewis John Carlino	Comedy drama film
1983	Brainstorm	Alex Terson	Douglas Trumbull	Science fiction film
1985	Shaker Run	Judd Pierson	Bruce Morrison	Action film
1987	Malone	Charles Delaney	Harley Cokliss	Action thriller film Based the 1980 novel Shotgun by William Wingate
1991	Wild Hearts Can't Be Broken	Dr. Carver	Steve Miner	Drama film
1992	Wind	Morgan Weld	Steve Miner	Drama film Based on the 1961 novel A Girl and Five Brave Horses by Sonora Webster Carver
1994	Renaissance Man	Colonel James	Penny Marshall	Comedy film
1995	Pakten	Ted Roth	Leidulv Risan	Comedy crime drama film Also known as The Sunset Boys
1996	Escape from L.A.	President Adam	John Carpenter	Post-apocalyptic action film
1998	Melting Pot	Jack Durman	Tom Musca	Drama film
1999	Family Tree	Larry	Duane Clark	Family drama film
2000	Mach 2	Vice President Pike	Fred Olen Ray	Direct-to-video action disaster thriller film
2001	Falcon Down	'Buzz' Thomas	Phillip J. Roth	Science fiction film
2002	Spider-Man	Ben Parker	Sam Raimi	Superhero film
2002	13th Child	Mr. Shroud	Thomas Ashley<nr/>Steven Stockage	Direct-to-video horror film Co-screenwriter
2004	Spider-Man 2	Ben Parker	Sam Raimi	Superhero film Cameo
2004	Riding the Bullet	Farmer	Mick Garris	Horror film Based on the 2000 novella of the same name by Stephen King
2007	Spider-Man 3	Ben Parker	Sam Raimi	Superhero film Cameo (final acting role)
2018	Spider-Man: Into the Spider-Verse	Ben Parker	Bob Persichetti; Peter Ramsey; Rodney Rothman	Animated superhero film Archival audio
2023	Spider-Man: Across the Spider-Verse	Ben Parker	Joaquim Dos Santos; Kemp Powers; Justin K. Thompson	Animated superhero film Archival footage from 2002 film

=== Television ===
Year	Title	Role	Notes
1950	Lux Video Theatre	Fireman #2	Episode: "The Token"
1951	The Philco Television Playhouse	Guest	Episode: "A Secret Island"
1951–55	Armstrong Circle Theatre	Various	4 episodes
1952	Hallmark Hall of Fame	Guest	Episode: "The Bride's Teapot"
1952	The Campbell Playhouse	Guest	Episode: "Forty Odd"
1952	Hallmark Hall of Fame	Guest	Episode: "Faith Is a Nine-Letter Word"
1952	Short Short Dramas	Guest	Episode: "A Portrait of General Garrity"
1952	Hallmark Hall of Fame	Guest	Episode: "Ten Thousand Words"
1952–54	Robert Montgomery Presents	Various	10 episodes
1953–54	Rod Brown of the Rocket Rangers	Rod Brown	59 episodes
1954	Modern Romances	Guest	Episode: "Grandma for an Hour, Part 1"
1956–61	The United States Steel Hour	Various	4 episodes
1956	Celebrity Playhouse	Jed Warron	Episode: "They Fire by Night"
1957	Kraft Theatre	Various	2 episodes
1957	11th Tony Awards	Self	Presenter
1958	Wagon Train	Liam Fitzmorgan	Episode: "The Liam Fitzmorgan Story"
1958	Playhouse 90	Danny Carson; Joe Clay	Episodes: "Natchez"; "Days of Wine and Roses"
1959	Westinghouse Desilu Playhouse	Johnny Garth	Episode: "The Hard Road"
1959	Alcoa Theatre	Johnny Keegan; Parker Sefton	Episodes: "Goodbye Johnny"; "Shadow of Evil"
1959	The Untouchables	Frank Holloway	Episode: "The Underground Railway"
1960	Playhouse 90	Lieutenant Carvet	Episode: "The Cruel Day"
1960	Riverboat	Martinus Van Der Brig	Episode: "End of a Dream"
1960–62	Outlaws	Various	3 episodes
1961	General Electric Theater	Pegosi	Episode: "The Small Elephants"
1961	The Dick Powell Theatre	Danny Langdon	Episode: "The Geetas Box"
1961	The Twilight Zone	Christian Horn Sr.	Episode: "A Hundred Yards Over the Rim"
1962	Bus Stop	Charlie Vansinger	Episode: "How Does Charlie Feel?"
1962	Golden Showcase	Rims O'Neil	Episode: "Saturday's Children"
1962	Ben Casey	Eddie Smith	Episode: "For the Ladybug....One Dozen Roses"
1962	Alcoa Premiere	Hoby Dunlap	Episode: "Second Chance"
1962	The Twilight Zone	Jerry Etherson	Episode: "The Dummy"
1963	20th Golden Globes	Self	Presenter
1963	The Eleventh Hour	Jeff Dillon	Episode: "The Man Who Came Home Late"
1963	The Outer Limits	Alan Maxwell	Episode: "The Galaxy Being"
1963	I've Got a Secret	Self	Episode: "Cliff Robertson"
1963	The Greatest Show on Earth	Willie Simple	Episode: "The Circus Never Came to Town"
1963–67	Password	Self	11 episodes
1963–73	The Tonight Show Starring Johnny Carson	Self	12 episodes
1964–65	People Will Talk	Self	3 episodes Also known as The Celebrity Game
1964	Breaking Point	Evan Ross	Episode: "So Many Pretty Girls, So Little Time"
1964	Suspense	Guest	Episode: "Protection"
1964–67	Bob Hope Presents the Chrysler Theatre	Various	4 episodes
1965	The Les Crane Show	Self	Episode: "#1.63"
1965	That Regis Philbin Show	Self	Episode: "#1.88"
1965	Grand écran (Big screen)	Self	Episode: "Compartiment Tueurs, Le Jour d'après"
1965	To Tell the Truth	Self	10 episodes
1965	The Price Is Right	Self	Episode: "August 10, 1965"
1965–68	The Match Game	Self	33 episodes
1966	House Party	Self	Episode: "August 10, 1966"
1966	Batman	Shame	Episodes: "Come Back, Shame"; "It's How You Play the Game"
1967	I've Got a Secret	Self	Episode: "Cliff Robertson"
1967	The Red Skelton Hour	Self; Arthur Artbuff	Episode: "A Bum for All Seasons"
1967	ABC Stage 67	Ben Weldon	Episode: "The Trap of Solid Gold"
1967–68	Hollywood Squares	Self	10 episodes
1967–68	Personality	Self	6 episodes
1967–68	Snap Judgment	Self	10 episodes
1968	The Sunshine Patriot	Christopher Ross; Arthur Selby	Made-for-TV movie directed by Joseph Sargent
1968	Batman	Shame	Episodes: "The Great Escape"; "The Great Train Robbery"
1968–69	Rowan & Martin's Laugh-In	Guest	2 episodes
1969	Bracken's World	Guest	Episode: "Stop Date"
1970	42nd Academy Awards	Self	Presenter
1973	The Man Without a Country	Philip Nolan	Made-for-TV movie directed by Delbert Mann
1974	Lincoln: Trial by Fire	Narrator	Made-for-TV movie directed by Ed Spiegel
1974	A Tree Grows in Brooklyn	Johnny Nolan	Made-for-TV movie directed by Joseph Hardy; Based on the 1943 novel of the same name by Betty Smith
1974	American Heritage	Narrator	Episode: "The Yanks Are Coming"
1975	My Father's House	Tom Lindholm Jr.	Made-for-TV movie directed by Alex Segal
1976	Return to Earth	Buzz Aldrin	Made-for-TV movie directed by Jud Taylor
1977	Washington: Behind Closed Doors	William Martin	Miniseries directed by Gary Nelson; Based on the novel The Company by John Ehrlichman
1978	Overboard	Mitch Garrison	Made-for-TV movie directed by John Newland
1982	Two of a Kind	Frank Minor	Made-for-TV-movie directed by Roger Young
1983–84	Falcon Crest	Dr. Michael Ranson	Season 3; 28 episodes
1985	The Key to Rebecca	Major William Vandam	Made-for-TV movie directed by David Hemmings
1986	Dreams of Gold: The Mel Fisher Story	Mel Fisher	Made-for-TV movie directed by James Goldstone
1987	Ford: The Man and the Machine	Henry Ford	Made-for-TV movie directed by Allan Eastman; Based on the biographical book about Ford by Robert Lacey
1990	Dead Reckoning	Daniel Barnard	Made-for-TV movie directed by Robert Michael Lewis
1992	Lincoln	Noah Brooks (voice)	Made-for-TV movie directed by James A. Edgar and Peter W. Kunhardt
1994	The American Revolution	George Washington (voice)	Miniseries directed by Lisa Bourgoujian
1995	Biography	Narrator	Episode: "P.T. Barnum: America's Greatest Showman"
1995	Dazzle	Mike Kilkullen	Made-for-TV movie directed by Richard A. Colla
1998	Assignment Berlin	Cliff Garret	Made-for-TV movie directed by Tony Randel
1999	The Outer Limits	Theodore Harris	Episode: "Joyride"
2003	The Lyon's Den	Hal Malloy	4 episodes

== Awards ==
Robertson was inducted into the National Aviation Hall of Fame in 2006. He received the Rebecca Rice Alumni Award from Antioch College in 2007. In addition to his Oscar and Emmy and several lifetime achievement awards from various film festivals, Robertson has a star on the Hollywood Walk of Fame at 6801 Hollywood Blvd. He was also awarded the 2008 Ambassador of Good Will Aviation Award by the National Transportation Safety Board (NTSB) Bar Association in Alexandria, Virginia, for his leadership in and promotion of general aviation. In 2009, Robertson was inducted into the International Air & Space Hall of Fame at the San Diego Air & Space Museum, and was part of the Living Legends of Aviation.
