= William Wingate =

South African lawyer and writer

- Born: 1939
- Died: 28 August 2012
- Occupations: poet lawyer, jurist, writer

William P. Wingate (1939 – August 2012) was an author. His work includes the novel Shotgun, which was adapted into the 1987 film Malone starring Burt Reynolds.

== Life and works ==
Wingate was born Ronald Ivan Grbich in South Africa. He was a lawyer as well as a writer.

The book Malone was based on was originally published as Hardacre's Way. The U.S. edition was published under the title Shotgun. Kirkus gave Shotgun an unfavorable review calling it a retread of Shane. A review of the book in New York Times states that "There is nothing at all new in the book, but Mr. Wingate tells his story very well, and there is something in all of us that responds joyously to the sight of an avenging angel destroying bullies and the forces of evil." The book takes place in the Blue Ridge Mountains, but the movie is set in Oregon.

== Bibliography ==
- Fireplay (1977)
- Blood Bath (1978)
- Shotgun (1981), also known as Hardacre or Hardacre's Way
- Crystal (1983)
- The Don: How to Run a Mafia Family
- Hong Kong, Let Candice Go!
- Doneska
- Wake Up Late, Read This ... Play Winning Poker Before Noon (2011), non-fiction book about playing poker
