= Replay review in gridiron football =

Use of instant replay to review on-field calls

In gridiron football, replay review is a method of reviewing a play using cameras at various angles to determine the accuracy of the initial call of the officials. An instant replay can take place in the event of a close or otherwise controversial call, either at the request of a team's head coach (with limitations) or the officials themselves.

Replay reviews are utilized in some high school games, and also for many games at the college level and above. Before the 2019 season, the National Federation of State High School Associations (NFHS), which establishes the rules for most high school and youth organizations in the United States (though not for Texas high schools), did not allow replay reviews even when the equipment exists to enable the practice. Effective in 2019, NFHS gave its member associations the option to allow replay review, but only in postseason games. In those leagues that utilize replay reviews, there are restrictions on what types of plays can be reviewed. In general, most penalty calls or lack thereof cannot be reviewed, nor can a play that is whistled dead by the officials before the play could come to its rightful end.

American and Canadian football leagues vary in their application and use of instant replay review.

== National Football League ==
=== 1986 to 1991 ===
The NFL first adopted a limited Instant Replay system in 1986. A Replay Official was stationed in the press box to monitor game play and video. The replay official communicated with the on-field game officials via two-way radio transmitters, and would decide which plays to review and made the final ruling. Reviews were limited to:

- Possession: fumbles, receptions, and interceptions
- Boundaries: sidelines, endlines, goal lines, and line of scrimmage
- Number of players on the field.

There was no time limit on how long the replay official could review a play in question, and this often led to lengthy game delays. In addition, the technology of the day was a limiting factor; in many instances, the video replays proved inconclusive, requiring the officials to revert to the call on the field. Between 1986 and 1991, only 12.7% of reviewed plays were reversed. During the six seasons it was utilized, instant replay was widely controversial and frequently criticized. Purists generally opposed it, while a majority of fans supported it. In 1990, a restriction was added which limited the review time to a maximum of two minutes. In addition, the audio would henceforth be muted from the video replays viewed by the Replay Official, in order to prevent the television commentators from influencing his decision. On January 5, 1991, a crucial instant replay review during the Redskins–Eagles Wild Card game was cited as a reason that owners voted to keep the system in place for at least one more season. After the conclusion of the 1991 season, however, NFL owners voted to scrap the system for 1992, citing several factors.

=== 1992 to 1998 ===
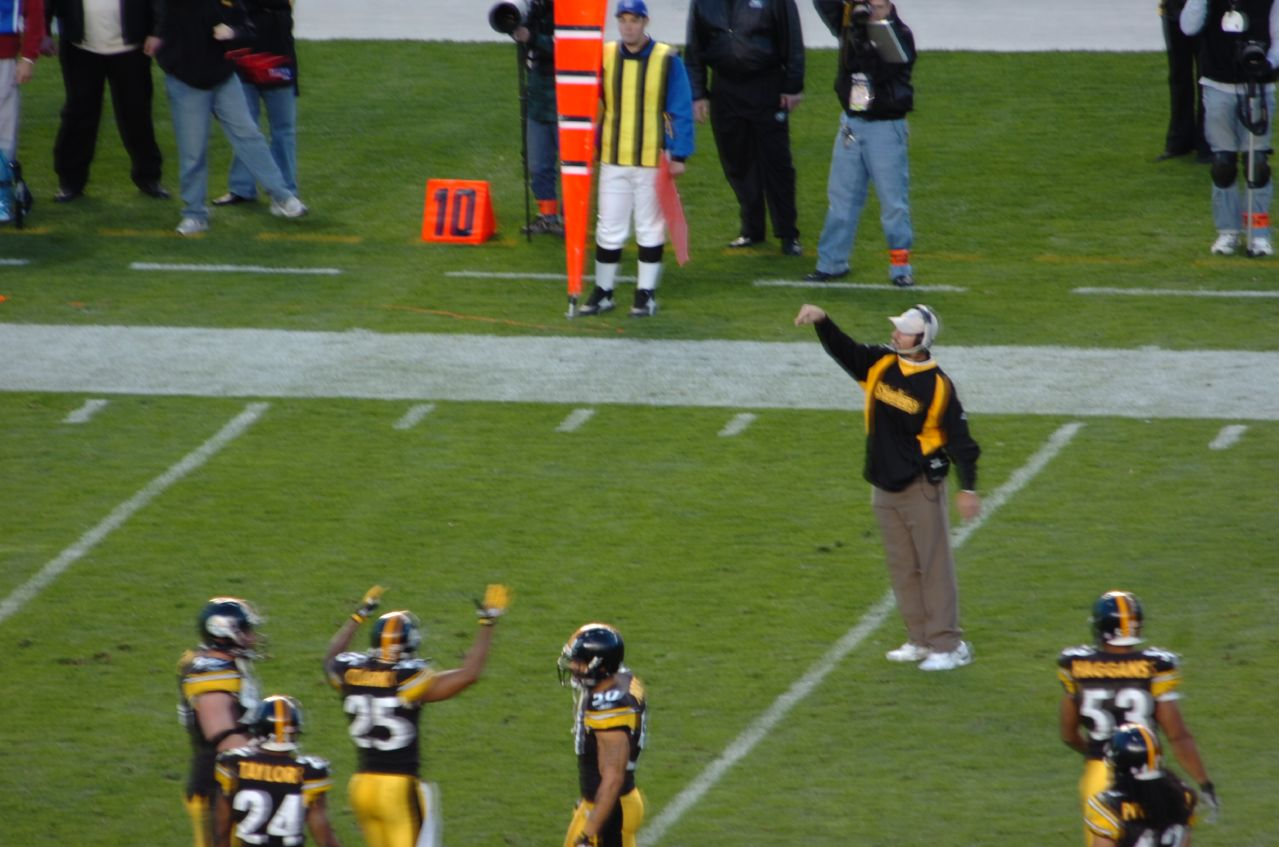
Bill Cowher, then head coach of the Pittsburgh Steelers, throws the red challenge flag (visible in the upper left corner of the picture), indicating his desire to challenge the officials' ruling.

No instant replay system was in use during the NFL regular season or postseason games from 1992 to 1998. In 1996, an experimental system was tested out during selected preseason games. This new system replaced the press box replay review with an on-field review by the game's officiating crew. Multiple monitors were installed at field level to provide quick access and to reduce delay. Each head coach was allowed three challenges per half, and most importantly, the replay stoppage time was limited to two minutes. The coach would throw a red flag to signal to the officials the desire to challenge a call on the field. Three categories of plays were deemed reviewable:

- Whether a player crossed the goal line, or is in his own end zone with possession of the ball
- Whether a player is in bounds as he runs with the ball, tried to make a catch/interception, or tries to recover a fumble
- Whether a team has the appropriate number of players on the field.

The system received generally positive reviews, but there were certain criticisms. There was no penalty for a failed challenge; coaches worried that the three challenges allowed per half could be abused and used simply as extra timeouts. Also, the scope of which plays were reviewable was deemed too narrow. The system was praised, however, as it shifted the focus towards correcting bad calls at critical moments that affected the outcome of the games, rather than wasting time on innocuous plays. In March 1997, despite some proposed tweaks, owners voted to reject adopting the system for the regular season.

In 1998, the NFL again tested instant replay during the preseason. The aforementioned 1996 system was tweaked, reducing the number of challenges to two per game (per team). A penalty was added such that a team would lose a timeout for a failed challenge that occurred inside the two-minute warning. The changes were made to ensure that replay would only be used for critical calls, and to avoid lengthy delays which interrupted the flow of the game.

After nearly seven full seasons without any instant replay system in place during regular and postseason, there was a renewed interest in bringing back replay for 1999. A succession of controversial calls in 1998 culminated in Week 14 during a crucial game between Seattle and the New York Jets on December 6. Facing a 4th & Goal at the 5 yard line, Jets quarterback Vinny Testaverde scored a game-winning touchdown with 20 second left in regulation. Television replays, however, showed that on Testaverde's scramble, his helmet crossed the goal line, but the ball did not. With no replay available, the call stood, and the Jets won the game 32–31. The loss all but knocked the Seahawks out of playoff contention, and three weeks later, head coach Dennis Erickson was fired. The loss to the Jets was described as the 'worst officiating call of the year'.

=== 1999 system ===
Instant replay was brought back for the 1999 season. The system resembled a setup used by the now-defunct USFL in 1985, and was a derivative of the experimental systems tested during the preseason in 1996 and 1998. Each head coach is given two Coach's Challenges per game which can be used on certain reviewable plays. The play must have commenced before the two-minute warning and the challenging team must have least one timeout remaining in the half. For 1999, the head coach was given two methods to signal his intent to challenge a call: a vibrating electronic pager and a red flag. The red flag was originally conceived as the "backup" method if the pager were to fail, but over time proved to be prompter and more popular. After 2005, the electronic pagers were eliminated for coaches and used henceforth only by the Replay Assistant upstairs.

The referee was permitted up to 90 seconds to watch video replays of the play in question and decide if the original call was correct. A strict time limit was put in place in order to minimize game delays, which were a frequent complaint of the former system. Initially, the referee departed the field of play to a covered booth on the sidelines equipped with a CRT television monitor to consult the video replays. Over time, the equipment was upgraded, first to high-definition, then to touch screen monitors under the hood. Eventually the booth was abandoned in favor of portable Microsoft Surface tablets held by an assistant. The referee must see "incontrovertible visual evidence" that the original call was incorrect for a call to be overturned. If the challenge fails, the original ruling on the field stands, and the challenging team is charged with a timeout. If the call is overturned, adjustments are then made – if necessary – to the score, the game clock, the play clock, and/or placement of the ball for the next play. No timeout is charged for a successful challenge.

For all plays inside the two-minute warning of each half, and for all plays during overtime, all reviews are initiated by the Replay Assistant, an official who sits in the press box and monitors the video feeds of the game play – similar in concept to the 1986–1991 system. These reviews are referred to as Booth Reviews. The Coaches Challenge is not permitted during these times, and the Replay Assistant is allowed an unlimited number of challenges. The procedure for the review is otherwise the same. When a review is requested from upstairs, the Replay Assistant buzzes down to the referee on the field using the electronic pager. The Booth Review was a compromise included as part of the 1999 system in order to protect the teams at such critical stages of the game. It helps prevent a bad call in the last two minutes (and overtime) from changing the outcome of the game. In addition, the booth review protects the teams as they do not have to feel compelled to "save" their Coach's Challenges to the very end. Since the Booth Reviews are initiated by the Replay Assistant, the team it affects need not have challenges and/or timeouts remaining for it to proceed.

The on-field Referee at the stadium was the sole arbiter of the replay, and was the only official permitted to watch the video clips. He was allowed to consult only briefly via headset with the Replay assistant, and was responsible for making the final ruling. Beginning in 2004, the rules were amended to award a third challenge if both of a team's original two challenges were successful. Teams had voiced concerns that in situations of obvious bad calls (even if it was easily overturned), they were still effectively being penalized, having to spend one of their two valuable challenges. In 2024 the rule was revised further, allowing a third challenge if either of the original two challenges were successful.

Because of the limited number of challenges allotted, and the penalty of a losing a timeout for an unsuccessful challenge, coaches typically reserve their challenges for key plays and for crucial times. A questionable call may not be challenged once the next play has been snapped, so coaches often have to make quick decisions with or without the benefit of seeing good replays on the stadium screen. If a questionable call is made, the offense may line up and try to snap the ball quickly to prevent the opposing coach from having a opportunity to challenge. Players on the field may also signal to the coach if they believe the play should be challenged.

=== Reviewable plays and rules ===
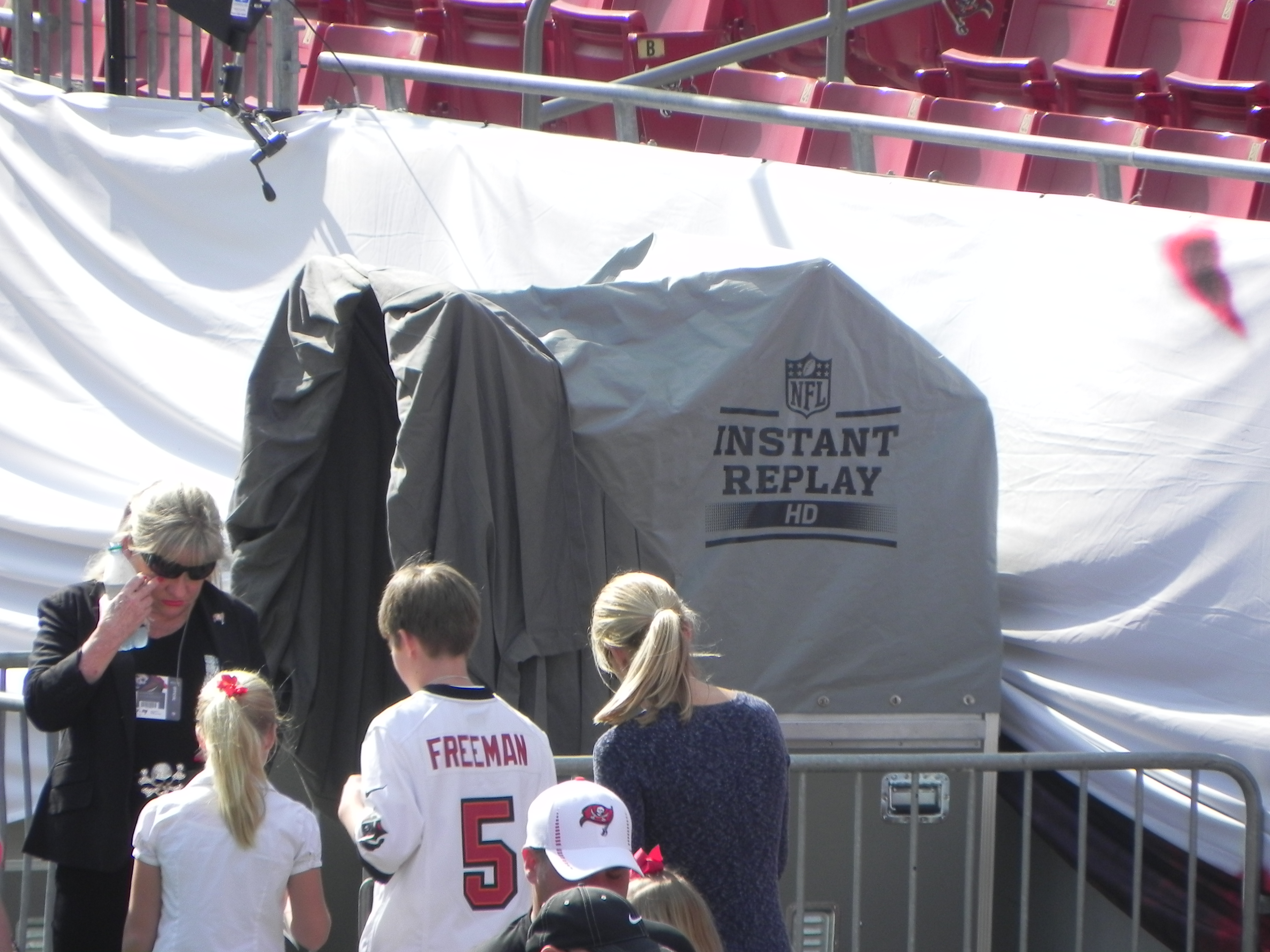
Instant Replay booth at Raymond James Stadium

The NFL replay system currently covers the following situations:

- All scoring plays
- All turnovers (including plays involving a turnover on downs)
- Pass complete/incomplete/intercepted
- Runner/receiver out of bounds (sidelines and endlines)
- Forward progress in regard to a first down
- Recovery of a loose ball in or out of bounds
- Touching of a forward pass, either by an ineligible receiver or a defensive player
- Quarterback pass or fumble
- Quarterback down by contact or stepping out of bounds before throwing a pass
- Illegal forward pass
- Forward or backward pass
- Runner ruled not down by contact
- Touching of a kick
- Whether a legal number of players is on the field at the time of the snap
- Ejections
- Whether time should be put back on the game clock at the end of any period (or after a play)
- Whether the game clock expired prior to the snap
- Game administration (correct application of the playing rules, proper down, spot of the foul for penalty application, "specific, objective aspects of a play")

The spot of the ball may be challenged in certain cases. A decision to re-spot the football after review, however, is not always considered enough to win the challenge. Only when the ball is re-spotted and the ruling on the field is reversed by re-measurement (e.g., the re-spotting of the ball results in a first down being awarded), is the challenging team not charged with a timeout.

If a review takes place while the game clock is running, the clock will be stopped for the review, and then it will re-start once the ball is set and ready for play. If a team commits a procedural penalty before the snap (e.g. Delay of Game or False Start), the opposing team still has the opportunity to challenge, provided it is done before the ensuing snap. Likewise, if a team calls a timeout, the opposing team is still permitted to challenge the previous play prior to the ensuing snap.

Inside the two-minute warning, if a team calls a timeout in the normal course of play, but the Replay Official buzzes down for a review of the previous play, the initial timeout is ignored and restored in favor of the replay stoppage. Starting in 2010, if the clock is running inside the final 60 seconds of either half, and the Replay Assistant buzzes down for a review, a ten-second runoff will be incurred if the call on the field is reversed. Either team may preserve the runoff by spending a timeout. In 2017, the runoff requirement was changed to inside the final two minutes of either half.

In 2005, a rule was added for the situation in which a coach sought a review when the team had no challenges left, was out of timeouts, or requested a challenge when they were not allowed (inside the two minute warning or during overtime), or for a non-challengeable call. Previously, the referee simply denied the challenge; instead the team would be now be assessed a Unsportsmanlike Conduct penalty. This was to close a perceived loophole preventing coaches from stopping the game clock, and/or just to argue with officials. Furthermore, in 2012, the penalty was expanded to include a loss of a timeout and the inability for the play in question to subsequently be reviewed by the Replay Assistant. The latter was rescinded in 2013, provided the rule is not abused.

For the 2019 season only, pass interference was reviewable as a response to the 2018 NFC Championship Game.

=== Automatic reviews (since 2011) ===
Starting in 2011, all scoring plays at any point during the game became subject to review by the Replay Assistant upstairs. Previously only plays that occurred inside the two minute warning were reviewable by the Replay Assistant. This change eased the burden on head coaches and teams, no longer requiring them to potentially waste a challenge on an obvious bad call involving a scoring play. In 2012, the automatic review was expanded to include all turnovers (interceptions and fumbles). It was further expanded to include scoring plays and turnovers negated by a foul, any successful or unsuccessful Try attempt, and plays involving a turnover on downs.

The automatic review only applies to plays in which the call on the field was a score (or a turnover). The head coach still must use a challenge if the call on the field was not a score (or a turnover), but the team believes it should have been. With the advent of automatic review, scoring plays and turnovers effectively became non-reviewable with respect to the Coaches Challenge, and thus a coach could incur a penalty for throwing the red flag on such a play.

=== Centralized system and Expedited Review ===
Beginning in 2014, all replays reviews are overseen centrally at the league's headquarters in New York. Consultants at "Art McNally GameDay Central" monitor all games across the league and queue up the best replay angles and directly assist the referee in making the decision. The move streamlines the process and assures that reviews are consistent across the league. It was loosely inspired by a similar setup employed by the NHL. It allows input from multiple experts, to ensure that rules are enforced properly and that no rules are accidentally overlooked. Previously, the on-site game referee was the sole arbiter of the review (with limited input allowed only from the Replay Official in the press box). The new system eases the burden on the game referee, allowing the crew assembled in New York to do most or all of the video examination in an isolated, controlled environment, with large screen high-definition monitors, and access to the rulebook at their fingertips. This allows the referee to focus instead on the on-site mechanics of the process. Initially the on-field referee still made the final decision, after the consultation with New York. Starting in 2017, the final ruling is now made in New York, with the on-field referee reduced to providing input, announcing the decision, and putting the ball back into play.

As technology has improved, starting in 2022 the NFL now employs what it calls Expedited Review. If the Replay Official or New York sees a "clear and obvious" error at any time during the course of play, they are allowed to communicate to the referee through his headset to immediately correct the error. These reviews are designed with quickness and efficiency in mind, and are completed on the spot without the need of a formal game stoppage and superfluous review.

== NCAA football ==
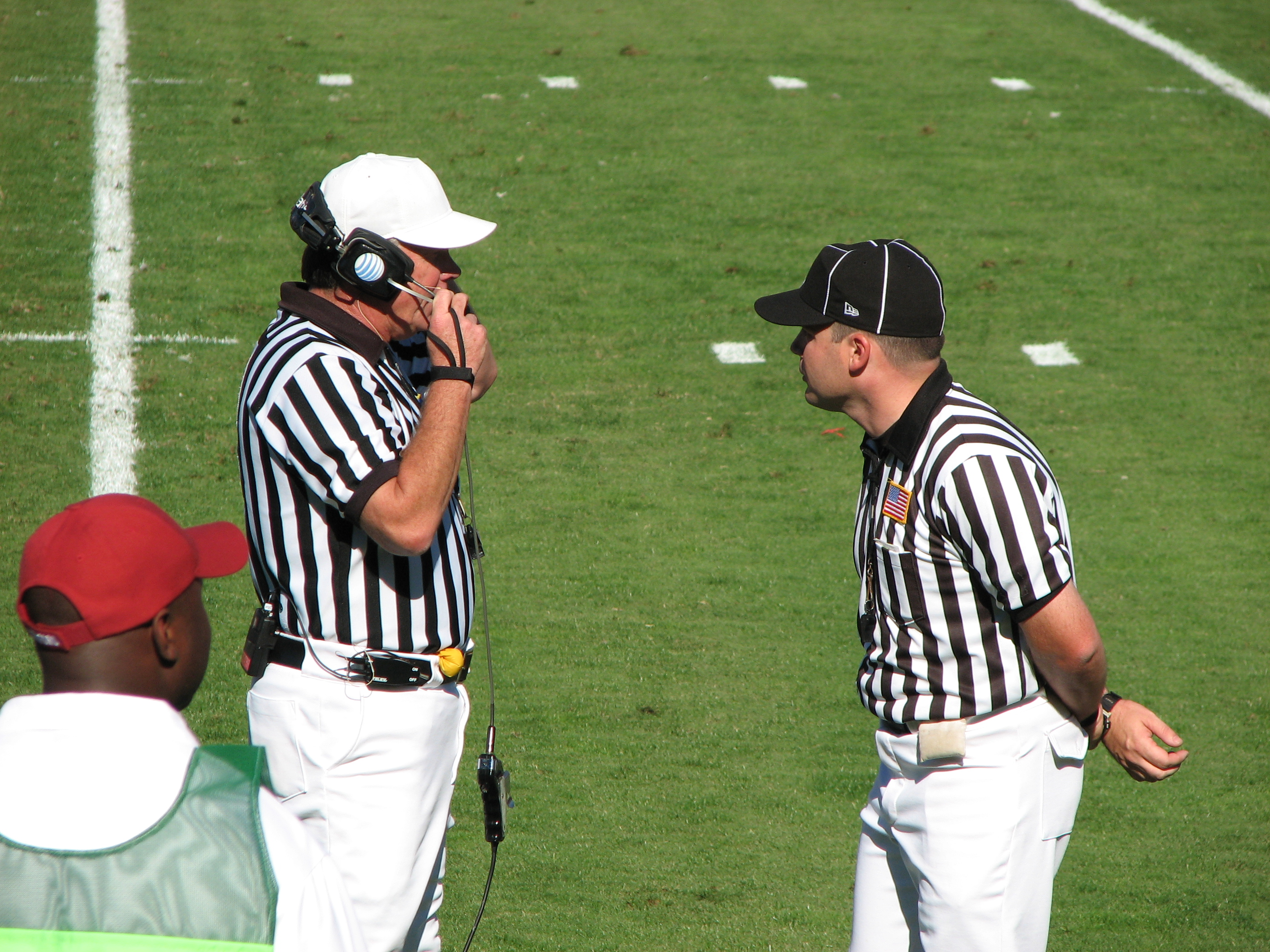
Referee (left) talking with the replay official

In 2006, the NCAA Football Rules Committee enacted instant replay guidelines and added them to the football playing rules. For games involving two schools from the same conference, league policy determines whether replay will be used. For non-conference games, the home team makes the determination.

Plays involving the sideline, goal line, end zone and end line, as well as other detectable situations, are reviewable (e.g., fumble/no fumble, pass complete/incomplete, touchdown/no touchdown, runner down/not down, player or ball inbounds/out of bounds, clock adjustments). Most fouls (e.g., holding, offside, pass interference) are not reviewable, except that in 2006, illegal forward passes, handoffs and punts from beyond the line of scrimmage, and too many players on the field are reviewable, and the foul may be called after replay review. Also, while pass interference is not reviewable, it can be overturned on review based on touching of the pass. By rule, pass interference cannot apply after a pass has been touched by any player, and the touching of a pass is a reviewable event. Most plays are routine and the game continues without interruption. If, however, the following criteria are met, the replay official (in a secure booth in the press box) may interrupt the contest by paging the game officials to stop the game before the next play starts. The criteria are:

- There is reasonable evidence to believe an error was made in the initial on-field ruling.
- The play is reviewable.
- Any reversal of the on-field ruling, which can only result from indisputable video evidence, would have a direct, competitive impact on the game.

Once per game, each head coach may also call a timeout and challenge the ruling on the previous play before the next play starts. A coach must have at least one timeout remaining in order to challenge (teams receive three timeouts per half). If the challenge is successful and the on-field ruling is overturned, the team keeps its timeout and is allowed only one more challenge. If unsuccessful, the team loses its timeout and is allowed no more challenges.

After reviewing the play from available video angles, the replay official decides if the call should be upheld or overturned. If the call is overturned, the replay official provides the information to restart the play, such as the team in possession, the yard line where the ball should be placed, the correct down and distance, and the correct time on the stadium clock. If an overturned call nullifies a scoring play, the score is changed back.

Beginning in 2025, NCAA referees making announcements regarding replay decisions may now only say that a ruling has been "upheld" or "overturned". Previously, officials would say whether a ruling was "confirmed" (meaning indisputable video evidence supported the initial call), "stands" (meaning the replay footage could not provide adequate proof to overturn the on-field call), or "reversed/overturned".

=== History ===
College football instant replay was started by the Big Ten Conference in the 2004 season, because of what happened in the 2000 Michigan vs. Illinois football game, when reviews were used experimentally in the Big Ten Conference only. In the 2005 season, all conferences were allowed to use instant replay. Among Division I Football Bowl Subdivision (see Division I-A) conferences, the Atlantic Coast Conference, Big East (since succeeded in football by the American Athletic Conference), Big Ten, Big 12, Conference USA, MAC, Mountain West Conference, Pac-10, and SEC used replay in 2005. The Sun Belt and Western Athletic (the latter of which did not sponsor football from 2013–2020, and now plays FCS football) did not.

In 2005, the Big 12 initially sought to provide field monitors to allow the on-field referee to assist the replay official; however, by the first game of the season, they decided to only provide equipment to the instant replay booth. Conference USA used a similar system, but the on-field referee made the decision after viewing a TV monitor on the sideline. The Mountain West Conference was the only league to allow a head coach's challenge. Each head coach got one challenge per half. If the call was overturned, the challenging coach kept his timeout and got a second challenge for that half. If not, the challenging coach lost one of his three timeouts for the half. No more than two challenges per half per coach were allowed.

There is not currently an instant replay equipment standard, each conference must choose (and purchase) its own equipment. Therefore, systems are quite disparate: they can be as complex as the high-tech custom systems similar as those used in the NFL to as simple as several large screens hooked to a digital video recorder using the direct-to-air feed of the broadcasting entity televising the game or a venue's internal coverage unit. Television coverage of NCAA games varies widely depending on the athletic conference, with most lower-level games not televised at all and many middle-level games only covered through rudimentary local or Internet broadcasts; the quality of replay camera angles thus varies accordingly. Eventually, most conferences in Division I FBS have adopted a shared system manufactured by the firm DVSport, which uses an on-field monitor for the head referee as well as a multi-feed application for the replay official.

In 2005, the Big Ten, MAC, and SEC only allowed broadcast video (for games that are televised) to be used to determine the correct call. The other conferences allowed broadcast video and scoreboard video. Most conferences provided video equipment for games that were not televised.

Instant replay was used in post-season games for the first time in the 2005 season. It was used in all 28 bowl games as well as the Division I Football Championship Subdivision (FCS, née I-AA), Division II and Division III national championship playoff games.

Beginning in the 2024 season, the NCAA permitted Division I FBS conferences to adopt a "collaborative" instant replay system where instead of separate replay officials being stationed at each stadium, a group of replay officials could watch and adjudicate multiple games from a centralized command center. The Big Ten had been the first to adopt a "bunker"-style setup on an experimental basis a year prior, centralizing all replay operations from conference headquarters in Rosemont, Illinois. 2025 saw the ACC given permission to air raw replay video and conversations between its replay officials (stationed within league offices in Charlotte, North Carolina) and game referees as part of selected television broadcasts.

== High school football ==
While NFHS rules prohibited the use of instant replay before 2019, Texas uses NCAA rules as its base set, allowing for the possibility of replay reviews. Through the 2018 season, Massachusetts also based its rules on those of the NCAA, but the state's governing body adopted NFHS rules effective with the 2019 season.

In Texas, the governing body for public-school sports, the University Interscholastic League (UIL), allows replay only in televised state championship games, and only if approved beforehand by the UIL. The UIL's list of reviewable plays is identical that of the NCAA. However, the UIL's rule differs in that coaches cannot challenge calls, replay officials cannot create targeting fouls that were not called on the field, and the UIL does not provide for collaborative replay experiments. By contrast, the main governing body for non-public schools, the Texas Association of Private and Parochial Schools, follows the pre-2019 NFHS rules in banning replay review.

Beginning in 2019, the NFHS allowed its individual state associations to devise their own instant replay review processes. While some states permit instant replay for regular season contests, in practice the majority of games where replay is available are state playoff or championship games, usually held in NFL or college venues with access to additional camera angles and suitable equipment. As of 2025, 17 states permit instant replay to be used in the state postseason at a minimum.

== Canadian Football League ==
The Canadian Football League board of governors approved the use of instant replay starting in 2006. When implemented, the CFL system appeared to be modeled largely on the NFL's, although some differences had been incorporated to accommodate differences between the two codes.

CFL teams are allowed only one challenge per game. A team must have at least one timeout in order to challenge, unless the challenge occurs in overtime, in which a team does not need a timeout to challenge a play. If a challenge is unsuccessful, a timeout is charged. Regardless of the outcome, teams do not get any additional challenges. After the three-minute warning in the fourth quarter, unused challenges are lost for the remainder of the game.

The current rule was instituted by new CFL commissioner Randy Ambrosie in August 2017 and took immediate effect. Ambrosie said that fans had been very clear they wanted a change concerning the video review system. He added that "Too many challenges and reviews are interrupting the game," and the last thing the game needs is an "artificial impediment" to the fans' enjoyment.

Previously, the CFL rules had been similar to the NFL in that teams were allowed two challenges per game, with a third challenge awarded if both challenges were successful. Prior to 2013, when CFL teams were allowed only one timeout per half, a timeout was charged only if the team's second challenge was not successful.

Another difference between CFL and NFL replay rules is that the CFL allows replay review of certain judgment calls. Since 2014, defensive pass interference situations have been reviewable, with replay officials authorized to overturn called fouls even if the pass had not been touched before the foul, and also to impose fouls that were not called on the field. Notably, the Edmonton Eskimos scored what proved to be the game-winning touchdown in the 2015 Grey Cup after they had successfully challenged an incompletion on the grounds of a missed pass interference call. The CFL added several other penalties, among them offensive pass interference, illegal contact, and roughing the kicker or passer, to its list of reviewable calls in 2016. These penalties can be reviewed only if challenged by a coach—replay officials have no authority to review penalties during automatic review situations, or after the three-minute warning in the fourth quarter.

The CFL Command Centre in Toronto has replay officials which conduct all reviews, rather than using a booth on the sidelines. Replay officials review all challenges, all scoring plays (including open-field plays that could have resulted in a touchdown), all unsuccessful convert attempts, and turnovers from fumbles or interceptions. They can also initiate a review for all plays after the three-minute warning in the fourth quarter. There is no time limit to make a decision.

== U Sports football ==
In 2017, the Ontario University Athletics (OUA) Governance and Nominations Committee ruled that the OUA would allow video sideline replay, the first conference in U Sports football to do so. By 2018, sideline instant replay software was being used by teams across the OUA conference and in 2019 all U Sports conferences decided to allow sideline instant replay.

Sideline instant replay is used almost entirely as a coaching tool at the U Sports level, as video instant replay is not used by officials to review calls in real-time at the U Sports level.

Video replay is used by the referees and governing bodies, only with the interest of improving safety and deterring egregious actions within sport. For this intent, videos that demonstrate an egregious offence within sport must undergo the appropriate video submission process whereby a member must provide a written request to review the incident, to the conference's chief operating officer, and copy the opposing institution within 48 hours after the conclusion of the game.

A review completed by a chief operating officer will occur only if one or many of the following cases has occurred during a game:

- A violent/dangerous act resulting in serious injury accompanied with potential for significant lost playing time.
- An act that meets the definition of Reckless Disregard
- Conduct of a person or coach which violates the OUA Code of Conduct and Ethics.

Once the review has concluded, the chief operating officer will provide a report stating whether or not a violation occurred. This decision is final and cannot be appealed. If the behaviour under review is deemed to have been a violation, the officer may impose sanctions reflecting the severity of the action, which are effective immediately. If it is determined by the officer that no violation has occurred, the matter is resolved.
