= The Pilot (film) =

1980 film by Cliff Robertson

- 1980 Theatrical Poster
- Directed by: Cliff Robertson
- Written by: Robert P. Davis
- Produced by: C. Gregory Earls
- Starring: Cliff Robertson; Diane Baker; Frank Converse; Gordon MacRae
- Cinematography: Walter Lassally
- Edited by: Evan A. Lottman
- Music by: John Addison
- Distributed by: Summit Films
- Release date: 1980
- Running time: 92 minutes
- Country: United States
- Language: English
- Budget: $2.5 million

The Pilot (also known as Danger in the Skies) is a 1980 American action-drama film by director and star Cliff Robertson and is based on the novel of the same name by Robert P. Davis. The movie had a notably troubled production.

== Plot summary ==
Mike Hagan is an airline pilot of nineteen years experience. He started off in the open cockpit as a crop duster. A cool, capable aviator, he is being considered by his airline for its pilot of the year award. However, this façade conceals a troubled man with a failing marriage who is an alcoholic. The film opens as he awakens hungover and begins the day with a stiff drink and an argument with his shrewish wife. The only bright spots in his life are his loving relationship with his daughter Cricket and his girlfriend Pat.

Hagan's skill at the controls is shown when he guides his plane through turbulence that almost causes another airliner to crash. However, a stewardess and Hagan's co-pilot begin to suspect trouble when they notice him continually going to the lavatory with a cup. Hagan keeps a bottle hidden there and begins to drink while he is flying. In denial, he keeps saying that he has it under control. After a harrowing flight in which Hagan makes an emergency landing, almost running out of fuel, his co-pilot refuses to fly with him again.

Hagan consults Dr. O'Brian, a psychiatrist, who teaches him how to cut down on his drinking and gives him medication. The airline assigns a veteran aviator, Larry Zanoff, as Hagan's co-pilot with a secret mission of monitoring Hagan's behavior to determine if Hagan has a problem. The psychiatric therapy is working as Hagan reduces his drinking. Zanoff begins to like Hagan and respect his abilities as a pilot. The film ends as Hagan narrowly averts disaster as the plane's engines catch fire during takeoff. He is acclaimed as a hero. But Hagan's uniform jacket had fallen to the flight deck in the cockpit during the engine fire incident and Zanoff inadvertently finds a small liquor flask in the jacket as he picks up the jacket so he could hand it to Hagan. Hagan tells Zanoff the truth. He resigns his job with the airline and goes back to cropdusting. However, he finally comes to terms with his addiction and plans a happy future with Pat. His doctor tells him the motto of Alcoholics Anonymous: "Take it one day at a time."

== Cast ==
- Cliff Robertson as Mike Hagan
- Diane Baker as Pat Simpson
- Frank Converse as Jim Cochran
- Gordon MacRae as Joe Barnes
- Milo O'Shea as Dr. O'Brian
- Dana Andrews as Randolph Evers
- Edward Binns as Larry Zanoff

== Production ==
The film was based on a novel by Robert Davis. Film rights were bought by real estate developer Gregory Earls. It was originally going to star George Kennedy.

Eventually Robertson agreed to star and co write. He was to be paid $300,000 plus a percentage of the profits. The budget was set at $1.5 million originally.

The film was shot in Florida in November 1978 in Marathon, Palm Beach and Opa Locka. Davis began as director but was replaced by Robertson during filming. Filming was difficult and the budget blew out. Ronee Blakely was hired to play a role but was fired during the shoot. The film finished four weeks' behind schedule and a reported $700,000 over budget (accounts vary).

Davis hired Emil Smith as an aviation consultant; Smith won a judgement against Davis for unpaid fees of $7,725, and Davis sought to recover the amount against his partner Gregory Earls. There were several other law suits involving the film. "The picture got out of control and there was no money to pay for it," said Davis.

Robertson's director's cut of the film was trimmed by Earls by 22 minutes. "It's been an unhappy experience for me," said Robertson. "Cliff gave it his best shot but he was overwhelmed by the material," claimed Earls.
