= List of Harlequin Romance novels released in 1959 =

This is a list of Harlequin Romance novels released in 1959. (Main index: List of Harlequin Romance novels)

== Releases ==
Number	Title	Author	Date	Citations
# 447	The Crimson Circle	Edgar Wallace	1959	
# 448	Bridal Array	Elizabeth Cadell	1959	
# 449	Come Back, My Dream (Nurse In Training)	Elizabeth Hoy and Paul Anna Solk	1959	
# 450	Gay Canadian Rogues	Frank Rasky	1959	
# 451	Air Ambulance	Jean S. MacLeod	1959	
# 452	Crescent Dream Book And Fortune Teller	None Listed	1959	
# 453	The Corner Cupboard	Carlyle Allison	1959	
# 454	Nurse In Love	Jane Arbor	1959	
# 455	Smoke Over Sikanaska	J.S. Gowland	1959	
# 456	The Yellow Snake	Edgar Wallace	1959	
# 457	Physical Fitness for All The Family	Lloyd Percival	1959	
# 458	Next Patient, Doctor Anne	Elizabeth Gilzean	1959	
# 459	Ring For The Nurse	Marjorie Moore	1959	
# 460	At The Villa Rose	A.E.W. Mason	1959	
# 461	For Ever And Ever	Mary Burchell	1959	
# 462	Love From A Surgeon	Elizabeth Gilzean	1959	
# 463	Nurse Brodie	Kate Norway	1959	
# 464	The Captain's Table	Alex Stuart	1959	
# 465	My Greatest Crime Story	Kurt Singer	1959	
# 466	The Traitor's Gate	Edgar Wallace	1959	
# 467	Nurse To The Island	Caroline Trench	1959	
# 468	Surgeon Of Distinction	Mary Burchell	1959	
# 469	Maggy	Sara Seale	1959	
# 470	The Cat In The Convoy	William G. Schofield	1959	
# 471	Nurse Hilary	Peggy Gaddis	1959	
# 472	Young Doctor Kirkdene	Elizabeth Hoy	1959	
# 473	The Cuckoo In Spring	Elizabeth Cadell	1959	
# 474	Towards The Dawn	Jane Arbor	1959	
# 475	The Mind Of Mr. J.G. Reeder	Edgar Wallace	1959	
# 476	Nurse Jess	Joyce Dingwell	1959	
# 477	Hospital Blue	Anne Vinton	1959	
# 478	Dear Trustee	Mary Burchell	1959	
# 479	The Case Of The Ebony Queen	Cleo Adkins	1959	
# 480	Grey Cup Cavalcade	Tony Allan	1959	
# 481	Bachelor Of Medicine	Alex Stuart	1959	
# 482	Nurse Harlowe	Jane Arbor	1959	
# 483	My Heart Has Wings	Elizabeth Hoy	1959	
# 484	The Northing Tramp	Edgar Wallace	1959	
# 485	Island Hospital	Elizabeth Houghton	1959	
# 486	Nurse Caril's New Post	Caroline Trench	1959	
# 487	The Happy Enterprise	Eleanor Farnes	1959	
# 488	The Man Who Died Twice	Sydney Horler	1959	
# 489	Consulting Surgeon	Jane Arbor	1959	
# 490	Nurse MacLean Goes West	Elizabeth Gilzean	1959	
# 491	Nurse Tennant	Elizabeth Hoy	1959	
# 492	Follow A Dream (Hospital Pro)	Marjorie Moore	1959	
# 493	The Man At The Carlton	Edgar Wallace	1959	
# 494	Love Is My Reason	Mary Burchell	1959	
# 495	Nurse With A Dream	Norrey Ford	1959	
# 496	Nurse In White	Lucy Agnes Hancock	1959	
# 497	You Took My Heart (Doctor Garth)	Elizabeth Hoy	1959	
# 498	The Eternal Circle (Nurse Atholl Returns)	Jane Arbor	1959	
# 499	Junior Pro	Kate Norway	1959	
# 500	Honorary Surgeon	Marjorie Moore	1959	
# 501	Do Something Dangerous	Elizabeth Hoy	1959	
