= Cameo Theatre =

American TV anthology series (1950–1955)

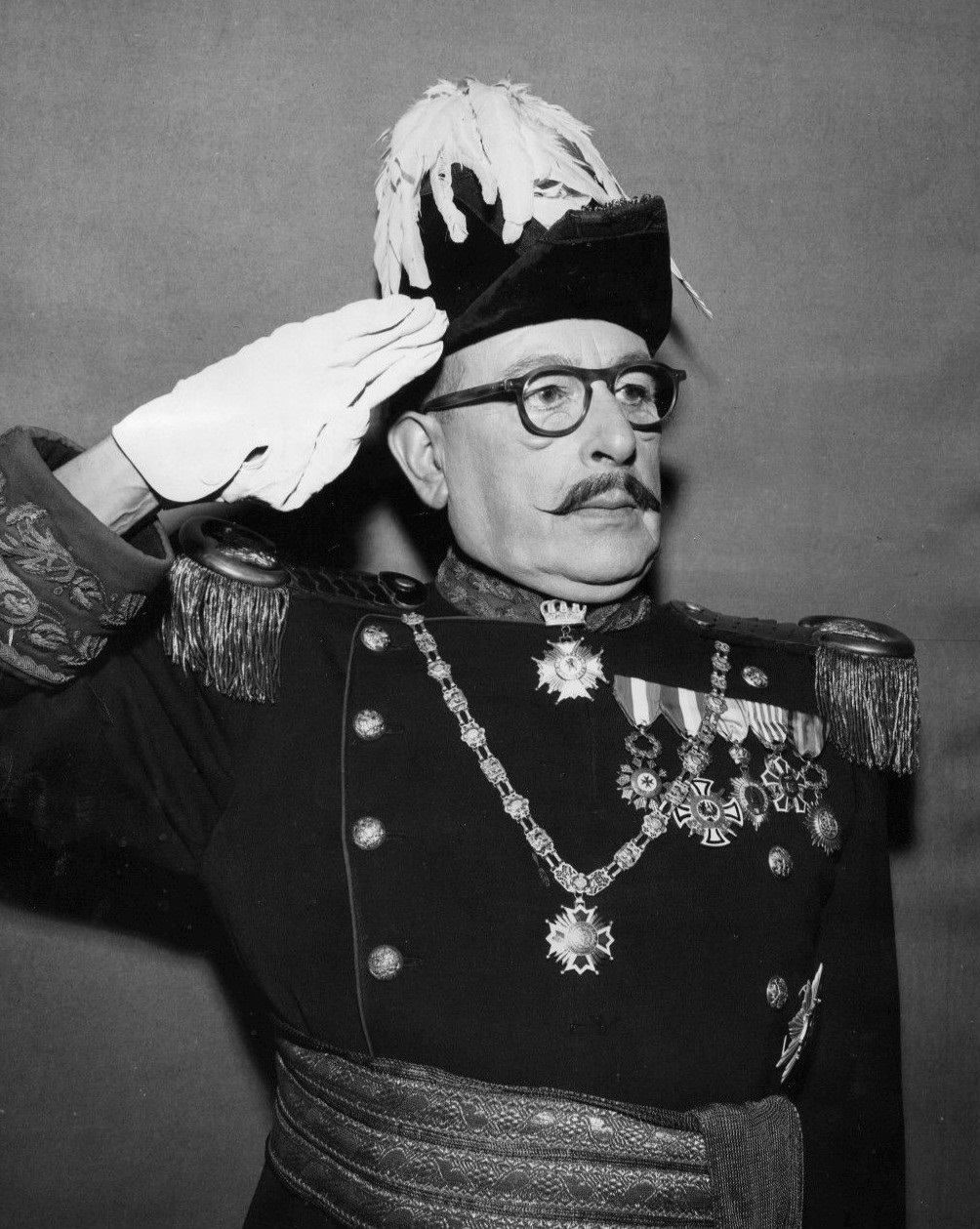
- Sir Cedric Hardwicke in George Bernard Shaw's "The Inca of Perusalem", 1955
- Genre: Drama
- Written by: Arthur Miller; Rod Coneybeare; Raphael Hayes; Shirley Jackson
- Country of origin: United States
- Original language: English
- No. of seasons: 4
- No. of episodes: 38

Production
- Running time: 30 minutes

Original release
- Network: NBC
- Release: 16 May 1950 – 7 August 1955

Cameo Theatre is an American anthology series that aired on NBC during the Golden Age of Television, from 1950 to 1955, three times as a summer replacement and once as a mid-season replacement for other series.

== Television in the round ==
The live series, produced by Albert McCleery, introduced to television the concept of theater-in-the-round, which had been well established and popularized since 1947 by Margo Jones with her Theatre '47 in Dallas, Texas. McCleery's method of staging employed minimal sets and props well lit within a black background, enabling cameras to move about with much freedom in the darkness, picking up shots from any angle. McCleery's skill with this type of staging led directly to his producer role with NBC's Matinee Theatre. The technique put the focus directly on the characters and dialogue rather than scenery. The way that McCleery used cameras became known as the "cameo shot" and was imitated widely.

Jim Buckley of the Pewter Plough Playhouse (Cambria, California) recalled:

When Al McCleery got back to the States, he originated a most ambitious theatrical TV series for NBC called Matinee Theatre: to televise five different stage plays per week live, airing around noon in order to promote color TV (which had just been developed) to the American housewife as she labored over her ironing. Al was the producer. He hired five directors and five art directors. Richard Bennett, one of our first early presidents of the Pewter Plough Corporation, was one of the directors and I was one of the art directors and, as soon as we were through televising one play, we had lunch and then met to plan next week’s show. That was over 50 years ago, and I’m trying to think; I believe the TV art director is (or was) his own set decorator (selecting furnishings and hand props)—yes, of course! It had to be, since one of McCleery’s chief claims to favor with the producers was his elimination of the setting per se and simply decorating the scene with a minimum of props. It took a bit of ingenuity.

== Story sources ==
Cameo Theatre featured adaptations from the short stories of Roald Dahl, Shirley Jackson, Irwin Shaw, and others. The Paley Center for Media detailed the scripting contribution of Ellen M. Violett:

Her first teleplay to be produced was an adaptation of Shirley Jackson’s "short shocker", "The Lottery" for NBC’s sustaining Cameo Theatre in 1950. Created and produced by Albert McCleery, Cameo Theatre was, as described by Tim Brooks and Earle Marsh in The Complete Directory to Prime Time Network and Cable TV Shows, 1946 to Present, “An interesting early experiment in the unique dramatic possibilities of television… produced in the round, using a minimum of props. It made considerable use of closeups and other camera techniques to focus attention on the characterizations of individual actors. High quality scripts were used, both originals and adaptations for television.” Broadcast on June 14, 1950, Violett’s adaptation of “The Lottery” was the fifth episode of Cameo Theatre, and helped McCleery establish his reputation as a television innovator with his Cameo “technique” of no scenery. “The Lottery” episode was awarded the Single Program Award by the National Conference for Community and Justice, for “promotion of mutual tolerance between people of different races and religions,” and thereby caused quite a stir in the middle of the era of blacklisting, especially as it was the subject of articles in both Time and Life magazines. “Without scenery, well-known actors or advance fanfare,” wrote Time in its issue dated June 26, 1950, “Cameo Theater… last week presented one of the most exciting plays ever shown on U.S. television.” Violett’s teleplay was produced again on August 31, 1951, as an episode of Fireside Theatre, starring Margaret Hayes.

Cameo Theatre was notable for developing young writers. Scripter Raphael Hayes recalled entering broadcasting after he left the Army:

I came out and got a job in the WNEW radio station in New York, as what we called a continuity writer, which paid enough, I suppose, to eat. And at that time television was beginning, and I figured why not try it and see what I could do. I had a little story in my head and I wrote it. You know the phrase “throw it over the transom?” That’s what I did–to the slush pile over at NBC. “A Little Night Music,” it was called, and I think it was a Cameo Theatre. And, my God, the telephone rang one day when I was working at WNEW, and I picked up the phone and listened very carefully, and she said, “We want to do your script.” I was stunned. I hung up, and everybody else in the office looked at me with vengeance. That’s where it began, professionally, where I was able to make some money out of the craft. After that happened, I began to figure out that if I did one television script a month, and they paid me at least $500 for that month, I could quit this job and live that way, doing one script a month for things like Cameo Theatre and other things that were around.

== Guest stars ==
- Ed Begley
- Constance Bennett
- Richard Carlson (actor)
- Angie Dickinson
- James Drury
- Nina Foch
- Cedric Hardwicke
- June Havoc
- Claire Luce
- Douglass Montgomery
- Mildred Natwick
- Judy Parrish
- Ernest Truex
- Sam Wanamaker

== Summer and mid-season replacements ==
NBC carried the series as a replacement show four times: It was telecast from June 14 to September 27, 1950, as a summer replacement for the second half-hour of Four Star Revue. From June 18, 1951, to August 6, 1951, it replaced What's My name?. It replaced Leave It to the Girls from January 6 to April 13, 1952. The series concluded in 1955 as a summer replacement (July 3 to August 21) for The Loretta Young Show.

Time slots for the broadcasts were as follows:

- 1950 - Wednesdays 8:30-9 p.m. Eastern Time
- 1951 - Mondays 8-8:30 p.m. E.T.
- 1952 - Sundays 10-10:30 p.m. E.T.
- 1955 - Sundays 10-10:30 p.m. E.T.

Each episode ended with McCleery's trademark closing tag, a hand holding chalk and writing "Albert McCleery" on a blackboard. The hand, however, was not McCleery's; although realistic in appearance, it was actually a mannequin hand holding the chalk.

== Episodes ==
The premiere episode was "It Takes a Thief". Other presentations were adaptations of Dark of the Moon and (in three parts in March 1952) Peer Gynt. Additional episodes included those shown in the table below.

Partial List of Episodes of Cameo Theatre
Date	Title	Actor(s)
May 30, 1950	"The Long Walk"	Richard Carlyle, Patricia Breslin
June 21, 1950	"Weep for the Heart"	--
June 28, 1950	"A Daughter to Think About"	--
September 20, 1950	"The Paper Sack"	Dennis Harrison, Pat Malone, John Marley, Pat O'Malley, James Little, John Gerstad, Tom Heaphy, Robert Bolger, Harry Kingston, John Harvey
June 25, 1951	"Blackout"	Jeffrey Lynn, Barbara Britton, Harry Hugenot, Robert Bolger, James Little, Paul Lilly, Bob Warren, Ann Anderson
July 23, 1951	"Of Unsound Mind"	Claire Luce, Philip Reed, Donald Briggs
July 30, 1951	"The Third Time"	Ilona Massey, Dan Morgan, Larry Kerr, Sanford Gold, Phil Sterling, Roger De Koven, Lyn Merrill, James Van Dyk, Rita Shaw, Bob Bolger
August 27, 1951	"Heart's Choice"	Tod Andrews, Miriam Goldina, Beverly Whitney, Constance Ford, Vinton Hayworth, Joe Roman, Jack Henderson
August 14, 1955	"The Man From The South"	Charles Addams, Joseph Schildkraut

== Production ==
Episodes emphasized content of the stories presented rather than visual elements. "No props, scenery, or fancy costumes were used in the productions." David Crandall directed. The program originated from WNBT-TV. In 1951, Noxzema was the sponsor, and Harry W. Junkin was the writer.
