= The Gates of Aulis =

1942 novel by Gladys Schmitt

- First edition
- Author: Gladys Schmitt
- Language: English
- Publisher: The Dial Press
- Publication date: 1942
- Publication place: United States
- Media type: Print (hardback)
- Pages: 652
- OCLC: 2557101
- Followed by: David the King

The Gates of Aulis is the first novel by the American writer Gladys Schmitt (1909–1972) set in 1940s Pittsburgh, Pennsylvania.

The novel tells the story of Carl Hasselmann and his sister Ellie, provincial, super-sensitive Americans who wrestle with existential questions.
