= George Lowther (writer) =

American screenwriter

- Born: George F. Lowther; April 9, 1913; New York City, New York, United States
- Died: April 28, 1975 (aged 62)
- Occupations: Writer, producer, director

George F. Lowther (April 9, 1913 – April 28, 1975) was a writer, producer, director in the earliest days of radio and television.

During the 1940s, he was a scriptwriter for the Superman radio programs on the Mutual Radio Network and the author of The Adventures of Superman (1942).

Born in New York City, Lowther broke into radio at 13 as an NBC page. Eventually, he wrote episodes for radio's Dick Tracy and Terry and the Pirates, as well as The Adventures of Superman. He also scripted for the Roy Rogers and Tom Mix radio programs. In later years, he wrote, produced and directed many dramas for The United States Steel Hour and Armstrong Circle Theatre and also wrote for The Edge of Night and The Secret Storm.

He later worked as a writer, director and producer for the Guy Lombardo and Morton Downey radio programs, as well as Broadway Calling with Gertrude Lawrence. Lowther joined the DuMont Television Network as an executive producer starting with its inception in 1945. He also wrote several adventure novels for children. By 1963 he had joined the Famous Writers School.

From 1974 to 1975, he wrote 44 episodes of the CBS Radio Mystery Theater. He also performed in the 1974 episode "The Headstrong Corpse".

== Personal life and death ==
Lowther married the former Florence Wagner. They had two sons, Kevin and Sean, and lived in Westport, Connecticut, where Lowther died on April 28, 1975, aged 62..

== Television credits ==
=== Producer ===
- Matinee Theatre (executive producer) (55 episodes, 1955–1956)
- The Secret Storm (1954) TV series (producer) (1955)
- Kraft Television Theatre (executive producer) (50 episodes, 1953–1954), also known as "Ponds Theater"
- The United States Steel Hour (executive producer) (23 episodes, 1953–1954), also known as "The U.S. Steel Hour"
- Armstrong Circle Theatre (producer) (62 episodes, 1950–1951)

=== Writer ===
- The Edge of Night, also known as Edge of Night (1956) TV series (unknown number of episodes, 1966)
- "Matinee Theatre" (wrote four episodes, from 1955 to 1957)
  - "Nine-Finger Jack" (1957) TV episode (screenplay)
  - "Make-Believe Affair" (1957) TV episode (adaptation)
  - "We Won't Be Any Trouble" (1957) TV episode (writer)
  - "The House on Wildwood Lane" (1955) TV episode (writer)
- "True Story" (1957) TV series (wrote an unknown number of episodes)
- "Star Tonight" (wrote one episode, "Will Power", in 1956)
- "General Electric Theater", also known as "G.E. Theater" (wrote one episode, "O'Hoolihan and the Leprechaun", 1956)
- "Climax!", also known as "Climax Mystery Theater", (wrote one episode, "Flame-Out in T-6", in 1956)
- "The United States Steel Hour" (also known as "The U.S. Steel Hour") (wrote one episode, "Freighter", in 1955)
- "Armstrong Circle Theatre" (wrote one episode, "The Bells of Cockaigne" (1953) TV
- "Kraft Television Theatre" (also known as "Ponds Theater") (1953) TV Series (wrote an unknown number of episodes)
- "Captain Video and His Video Rangers" (also known as "Captain Video") (wrote 4 episodes in 1952)
- "Tom Corbett, Space Cadet" (1950) TV series (wrote an unknown number of episodes)
- Kraft Television Theatre (1947) TV series (wrote an unknown number of episodes)

=== Director ===
- A Christmas Carol (1943) (TV)
