= The Persistent Image =

1955 novel by Gladys Schmitt

- First edition
- Author: Gladys Schmitt
- Language: English
- Genre: Novel
- Publisher: The Dial Press
- Publication date: 1955
- Publication place: United States
- Media type: Print (hardback)
- Pages: 308
- OCLC: 1263265

The Persistent Image is a novel by the American writer Gladys Schmitt (1909–1972), It set in a fictional version of 1950s Pittsburgh, Pennsylvania.

A romance, John Reiber and Helen Cameron overcome the obstacles that stand between them: his resentment of her higher class, his inability to forgive her for her former marriage, and his hatred of the divorced husband. Reiber's shame lessens gradually over his own family's lower middle class pretensions, and he confronts reality.

Novelist Gladys Schmitt, a Pittsburgh native, taught literature and writing at Carnegie Mellon University from 1942 to 1972.
