= The Adventures of Superman (novel) =

1942 novel by George Lowther

- Author: George Lowther
- Illustrator: Joe Shuster
- Language: English
- Genre: Superhero fiction
- Publication date: 1942
- Publication place: USA

The Adventures of Superman is a novel by George Lowther. It was first published in 1942 with illustrations by Joe Shuster, the co-creator of Superman. Upon its release in 1942, it was advertised as being "approved by the children's book committee of the Child Study Association of America". A facsimile edition was released in 1995 by Applewood Books, with a new introduction by Roger Stern.

== Background ==
This book is the first novelization of a comic book character, and also the first Superman story credited to someone other than Jerry Siegel. It was Lowther who first provided many now-familiar details of Superman's birth and early life. The first two chapters provide the first detailed description of the planet Krypton, and renamed Kal-El's parents Jor-El and Lara who previously had been named Jor-L and Lora. The next three chapters deal with Clark Kent's childhood on the farm of his adoptive parents, Eben and Sarah Kent (in the comics, the Kents went through many name changes before settling on Jonathan and Martha in 1952). In the sixth chapter, Clark arrives in Metropolis and gets a job with the Daily Planet, while the remaining eleven chapters deal with a mystery involving ghost ships and Nazi spies.

The book is illustrated with four full-page color illustrations, six full-page black-and-white illustrations, and numerous sketches, all examples of Joe Shuster's work. The book was published as Armed Services Edition #656 in May 1945.

== Reception ==
Michael Rogers wrote in the Library Journal that the novel is "a great piece of Americana", and was published to "cash in on the man of steel's popularity in comics as well as on radio for which Lowther was a scriptwriter". He points out though that it was "originally written for a young adult audience ... and is probably a little too sophisticated for today's youth and will probably find a wider readership among adults who enjoyed Superman as kids".

The Chicago Sun-Times opined that when Lowther gave Superman and his father the last name of El, which is a Hebrew word for God, "from that point forward, with the father christened Jor-El and the son christened Kal-El, the Superman story became one of El (God) the father sending El (God) the son to save the Earth".

J.J. Sedelmaier of Print Magazine praised the artwork of Joe Shuster, noting how each chapter page "includes a black and white pen/brush and ink illustration" ... that are "tasty, gestural pieces of inspiration" ... and the illustrations are "immediate and almost impulsive ... and not what I would expect from a book produced in 1942". He opined that including this artwork "puts a focus on the artist as opposed to the character" and is "daring in its loose expression and vitality".
