= Albert McCleery =

American television producer

Albert McCleery (December 30, 1911 – May 13, 1972) was an American pioneering television producer during the 1950s. He had a reputation "as an innovative contributor to some of television's most esteemed theatrical productions".

McCleery was the son of Mr. and Mrs. J. C. McCleery. He spent much of his youth in Fort Worth, Texas, and graduated from R. L. Paschal High School there. He helped to found a dramatic club at the school, and as a senior he was named the best actor in one-act play competition in Austin, Texas. He went on to attend Northwestern University and Pasadena Community Playhouse.

McCleery had a background in American community theatres, having helped in the creation of experimental theatre companies across the United States. He explained his failing out of the School of Speech and Theatre Arts at Northwestern by saying that he worked so hard on creating the Georgian Little Theatre (the first arena theatre in the midwestern United States) that "I didn't have time to listen to the professor spout theory".

In 1939, Pittman Publishing Company published Curtains Going Up, by McCleery and Carl Glick. The book explored the community theatre movement, which a review described as "one of the newer social forces in modern American life". McCleery also wrote a column, "West of Broadway" for Stage Magazine. After that publication ceased, he began his own magazine, American Theater, in 1940, with his column as one component.

McCleery left Columbia Studios in September 1942 to become a second lieutenant in the U. S. Army. In March 1945 he transferred from the Signal Corps to become a paratrooper. He commanded a photographic crew in the 101st Airborne Division during the invasion of Germany. He left the Army in February 1946 as a lieutenant colonel. While serving he received the Bronze Star, the Silver Star, and three campaign stars.

He was head of the arena theatre at Fordham University before his television debut as a director of NBC Repertory Theatre. After that, he directed The Philco Television Playhouse, but an error-laden episode of that program led to his reassignment in 1949 to directing a puppet show.

McCleery advocating the elimination of elaborate, expensive scenery for television programs, preferring instead to use more close-ups of faces and more rudimentary backgrounds. He said that approach saved money that could be spent more wisely in other ways: "So why spend the money on scenery when you can spend it on good writers instead?"

He created his innovative Cameo Theatre for television in 1950. A weekly live production, it continued until 1955. On this half-hour series, McCleery offered dramas seen against pure black backgrounds instead of walls of a set. This enabled cameras in the darkness to pick up shots from any angle. His work with Cameo Theatre led to his position with NBC's Matinee Theatre in 1955.

McCleery was the creator and producer of NBC Matinee Theater. Jim Buckley of the Pewter Plough Playhouse (Cambria, California) recalled:

When Al McCleery got back to the States, he originated a most ambitious theatrical TV series for NBC called Matinee Theatre: to televise five different stage plays per week live, airing around noon in order to promote color TV (which had just been developed) to the American housewife as she labored over her ironing. Al was the producer. He hired five directors and five art directors. Richard Bennett, one of our first early presidents of the Pewter Plough Corporation, was one of the directors and I was one of the art directors and, as soon as we were through televising one play, we had lunch and then met to plan next week's show. That was over 50 years ago, and I'm trying to think; I believe the TV art director is (or was) his own set decorator (selecting furnishings and hand props)—yes, of course! It had to be, since one of McCleery's chief claims to favor with the producers was his elimination of the setting per se and simply decorating the scene with a minimum of props. It took a bit of ingenuity.

McCleery was producer and director of the Hallmark Hall of Fame. In 1953, he directed a two-hour television production of Hamlet for the Hallmark Hall of Fame. The production starred Maurice Evans. It was the first time Hamlet was presented on TV, the longest drama presented on TV up to that time, and Evans's only portrayal of the role on television, after having played it on Broadway in several productions.

McCleery also produced The Further Adventures of Ellery Queen on NBC beginning in 1958.

By 1960, McCleery had moved to CBS, where he was producer of The CBS TV Workshop.

McCleery became director and executive producer of the Pasadena Playhouse in July 1966. He had been on its board of directors for 13 years prior to the appointment.

McCleery married Sannye Sue Bailey in 1939.
