= NBC Matinee Theater =

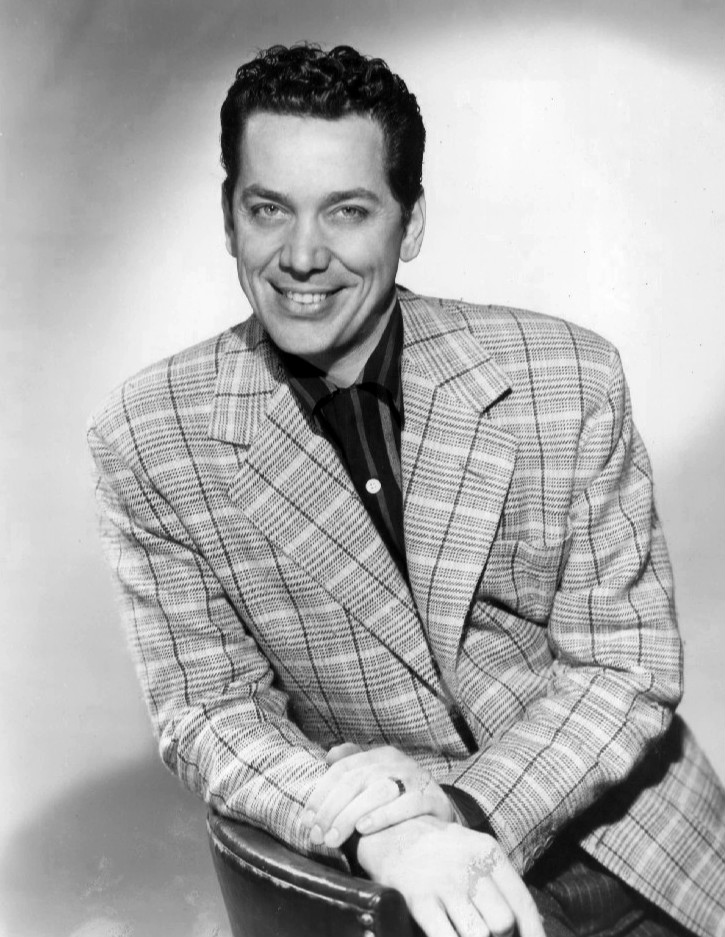
- Host John Conte
- Also known as: Matinee Theater
- Genre: Anthology
- Directed by: John Drew Barrymore; Alan Cooke; Walter Grauman; Arthur Hiller; Lamont Johnson; Sherman Marks; Lawrence Menkin; Albert McCleery; Boris Sagal; Pace Woods; Alan Hanson
- Presented by: John Conte
- Country of origin: United States
- Original language: English
- No. of seasons: 3
- No. of episodes: 650

Production
- Executive producer: George Lowther
- Producers: George Cahan; Albert McCleery; Frank Price; Darrell Ross
- Running time: 45–48 minutes
- Production company: NBC Television Network

Original release
- Network: NBC
- Release: October 31, 1955 – June 27, 1958

Matinee Theater is an American anthology series that aired on NBC during the Golden Age of Television, from October 31, 1955, to June 27, 1958. Its name is often seen as Matinee Theatre.

The series, which ran daily from 3 p.m. to 4 p.m. Eastern Time, was usually broadcast live and most of the time in color. Its live dramas were presented with minimal sets and costumes. It was the first daily hour-long dramatic series on television.

When it was broadcast, Matinee Theater was the most heavily promoted regularly scheduled daytime program on U.S. television. Along with NBC's Home, the show was part of the network's effort to "provide quality 'adult' entertainment" in daytime programming.

In its second season, the program had an audience of 7 million daily viewers.

The series ended in 1958 due to its high budget; much higher than any other daytime program in television. In 1956, the program's budget was "about $73,000" to produce five episodes per week. A few of the later episodes were preserved on color film for later rerun syndication under different titles. The scripts of the series' episodes are archived at the University of California, Los Angeles. Several episodes are preserved at the UCLA Film & Television Archive, The Paley Center, and the Library of Congress.

== Buckley's comments ==
Jim Buckley of the Pewter Plough Playhouse (Cambria, California) recalled:

When Al McCleery got back to the States, he originated a most ambitious theatrical TV series for NBC called Matinee Theater: to televise five different stage plays per week. This series aired live at 3 p.m. Eastern time and 12 noon Pacific, in order to promote color TV (which had just been developed) to the American housewife as she labored over her ironing. Al [McCleery] was the producer. He hired five directors and five art directors. Richard Bennett, one of our first early presidents of the Pewter Plough Corporation, was one of the directors and I was one of the art directors and, as soon as we were through televising one play, we had lunch and then met to plan next week’s show. That was over 50 years ago, and I’m trying to think; I believe the TV art director is (or was) his own set decorator (selecting furnishings and hand props)—yes, of course! It had to be, since one of McCleery’s chief claims to favor with the producers was his elimination of the setting per se and simply decorating the scene with a minimum of props. It took a bit of ingenuity.

== Personnel and production ==
Directors included Walter Grauman, Boris Sagal, Lamont Johnson, Arthur Hiller, Lawrence Schwab, Allen A. Buckhantz, Alan Cooke, and Livia Granito. The show initially had 16 directors, but McCleery released those who could not promptly answer questions about what they needed or wanted for episodes.

A staff of about a dozen people searched through books, magazines, and material in the public domain, looking for ideas, and about the same number of writers produced material for the program.

While one episode of the program was being broadcast, the next day's episode was in final rehearsal. Both occurred in the same studio, with a soundproof curtain separating the activities. Two crews of 75 technicians each worked on the projects. Meanwhile, four future episodes were being rehearsed in four rehearsal halls in a facility at the corner of Vine and Selma in Los Angeles.

== Notable guest stars ==
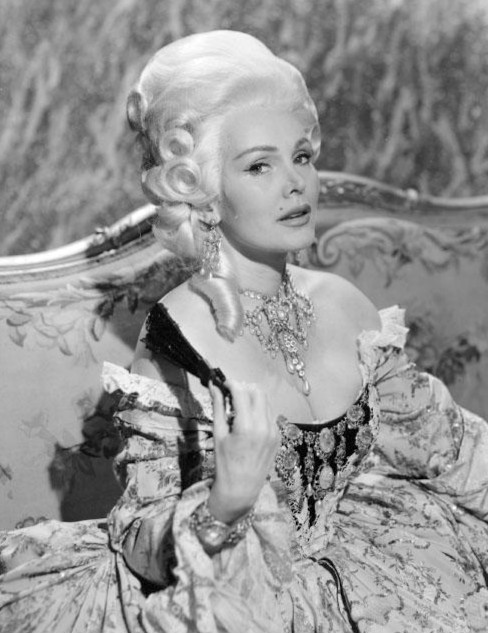
Zsa Zsa Gabor as Madame Brillon in The Last Voyage, 1957.

- Anna Maria Alberghetti
- Steve Allen
- Mary Astor
- Jim Backus
- Patricia Barry
- Jacques Bergerac
- Richard Boone
- Laurie Carroll
- Leo G. Carroll
- Chuck Connors
- Richard Crenna
- Jane Darwell
- Bradford Dillman
- Joanne Dru
- Shelley Fabares
- Frances Farmer
- Nina Foch
- Eva Gabor
- Edmund Gwenn
- June Havoc
- Wendy Hiller
- Dennis Hopper
- Edward Everett Horton
- Vivi Janiss
- David Janssen
- Cecil Kellaway
- DeForest Kelley
- Shirley Knight
- Michael Landon
- Cloris Leachman
- Anita Louise
- Roddy McDowall
- Darren McGavin
- Martin Milner
- Agnes Moorehead
- Rita Moreno
- Jack Nicholson
- Hugh O'Brian
- Margaret O'Brien
- Arthur O'Connell
- Maureen O'Sullivan
- Susan Oliver
- Geraldine Page
- Suzanne Pleshette
- Mala Powers
- Barbara Rush
- George Peppard
- Vincent Price
- Cesar Romero
- Marian Seldes
- Pat Sheehan
- Marilyn Simms
- Wim Sonneveld
- Dean Stockwell
- Phyllis Thaxter
- Marshall Thompson
- Rudy Vallee
- Ethel Waters
- James Whitmore
- Mary Wickes
- Fay Wray
- Alan Young

== Award nominations ==
Year	Award	Category	Nominee(s)	Result	Ref.
1956	Emmy Award	Best Contributing to Daytime Programming	NBC Matinee Theater	Won	
1957	Golden Globe Award	Television Achievement	NBC Matinee Theater	Tied (Note: Tied with The Mickey Mouse Club, Cheyenne, Playhouse 90, and This Is Your Life)	

== Notable episodes ==
The program's initial presentation was "Beginning Now", by John P. Marquand, starring Louis Hayward.

== Episodes ==
=== Season 1 (1955–56) ===
No. overall	No. in season	Title	Directed by	Written by	Original release date
1	1	"Beginning Now"	Albert McCleery	Story by : John P. Marquand; Teleplay by : Frank Gilroy	October 31, 1955
2	2	"Make Believe Mother"	Unknown	Story by : Ricky Zurex; Teleplay by : Nicholas E. Baehr	November 1, 1955
3	3	"The Persistent Image"	Unknown	Story by : Gladys Schmitt; Teleplay by : Helene Hanff	November 2, 1955
4	4	"I'm Straight With The World"	Boris Sagal	Theodore Apstein	November 3, 1955
5	5	"Progress And Minnie Sweeney"	Larry Schwab	Edmond Kelso	November 4, 1955
6	6	"The House On Wildwood Lane"	Unknown	George Lowther	November 7, 1955
7	7	"Beyond A Reasonable Doubt"	Unknown	Henry Misrock	November 8, 1955
8	8	"One For The Road"	Unknown	Ellis St. Joseph	November 9, 1955
9	9	"An Apple For Miss Myrtle"	Unknown	Story by : Margaret Cousins; Teleplay by : Robert Howard Lindsay and Kathleen Lindsey	November 10, 1955
10	10	"The Man Without A Country"	Lamont Johnson	Story by : Edward Everett Hale; Teleplay by : Elihu Winer	November 11, 1955
TBA	TBA	"Big Hearted Herbert"	TBA	Story by : Sophie Kerr; Teleplay by : Kay Arthur	TBA
11	11	"Jigsaw"	Unknown	Seymour Stern	November 14, 1955
12	12	"She's The One With The Funny Face"	Unknown	Story by : Robert Barbash; Teleplay by : Helene Hanff	November 15, 1955
13	13	"All The Hoffmeyers In The World"	Walter Grauman	Anthony Spinner	November 16, 1955
14	14	"The Aspern Papers"	Arthur Hiller	Story by : Henry James; Teleplay by : Michael Dyne	November 17, 1955
15	15	"Roman Fever"	Sherman Marks	Story by : Edith Wharton; Teleplay by : Hoffman R. Hays	November 18, 1955
16	16	"Midsummer"	Boris Sagal	Story by : Nancy Hale; Teleplay by : Speed Lamkin	November 21, 1955
17	17	"The Lady Chooses"	Unknown	William McCleery	November 22, 1955
18	18	"The Courtship Of Miles Standish"	Lamont Johnson	Story by : Henry Wadsworth Longfellow; Teleplay by : Ellen & Richard McCracken	November 23, 1955
19	19	"The Dispossessed"	Allan A. Buckhantz	Story by : Nedra Tyre; Teleplay by : Elizabeth Hart and James Hart	November 25, 1955
20	20	"One For The Road (II)"	Unknown	Ellis St. Joseph	November 28, 1955
21	21	"The Touchstone"	Arthur Hiller	Story by : Edith Wharton; Teleplay by : Jerome Rose and Lois Jacoby	November 29, 1955
22	22	"Wuthering Heights"	Lamont Johnson	Story by : Emily Bronte; Teleplay by : Lois Jacoby	November 30, 1955
23	23	"The Brass Ring"	Unknown	Story by : Jacqueline Rhodes; Teleplay by : Herman Knight, James Leo Herlihy, & William Noble	December 1, 1955
24	24	"Jason"	Unknown	Story by : Samson Raphaelson; Teleplay by : Lawrence Hazard	December 2, 1955
25	25	"Arrowsmith"	Boris Sagal	Story by : Sinclair Lewis; Teleplay by : Robert Howard Lindsay and Kathleen Lindsey	December 5, 1955
26	26	"Passing Strange"	Unknown	E. Jack Neuman	December 6, 1955
27	27	"For These Services"	Unknown	Theodore Ferro and Mathilde Ferro	December 7, 1955
TBA	28	"Cordially - With Bombs"	Unknown	Story by : Phillip S. Goodman & Robert Nathe; Teleplay by : Harold Callen	December 8, 1955
29	29	"White-Oaks"	Allan Buckhantz	Story by : Mazo De La Roche; Teleplay by : Kay Arthur	December 9, 1955
30	30	"O'Toole From Moscow"	Laurence Schwab	Rod Serling	December 12, 1955
31	31	"The Milwaukee Rocket"	Jim Jordan	Story by : Ted Prideaux; Teleplay by : Dale Wasserman	December 13, 1955
32	32	"This One Is Different"	Livia Granito	S.S. Schweitzer	December 14, 1955
33	33	"The Sins Of The Fathers"	Boris Sagal	David Davidson	December 15, 1955
34	34	"See You On Sunday"	Unknown	Charles Mergendahl	December 16, 1955
35	35	"Coming Of Age"	Tad Danielewski	Harold & Johanna Brodky	December 19, 1955
36	36	"Technique"	Unknown	Story by : Thyra Samter Winslow; Teleplay by : Lois Jacoby	December 20, 1955
37	37	"Gallin, All-American"	Unknown	Nicholas E. Baehr	December 21, 1955
38	38	"Santa Is No Saint"	Arthur Hiller	Frank and Doris Hursley	December 22, 1955
39	39	"The Unwelcomed"	Unknown	Story by : Gladys Schmitt; Teleplay by : Ann Elmo	December 23, 1955
40	40	"The Red Sanders Story"	Walter Grauman	Story by : George Bruce; Teleplay by : Wilton Schiller	December 26, 1955
41	41	"Elisha And The Long Knives"	Unknown	Dale Wasserman And Jack Balch	December 27, 1955
42	42	"Horns Of Dilemma"	Unknown	Harold Callen	December 28, 1955
43	43	"It Sometimes Happens Twice"	Unknown	George Baxt	December 29, 1955
44	44	"The Shot"	Allan A. Buckhantz	E. Jack Neuman	December 30, 1955
45	45	"Mr.Krane"	Boris Sagal	Arthur Rodney Conebeare	January 3, 1956
46	46	"Yesterday Is Gone"	Unknown	Story by : Eileen and Robert Mason Patrick; Teleplay by : Peggy Phillip	January 4, 1956
47	47	"Double Door"	Unknown	Story by : Elizabeth McFadden; Teleplay by : Kay Arthur	January 5, 1956
48	48	"The Happy Rest"	Unknown	N.Richard Nash	January 6, 1956
49	49	"The Gate"	Unknown	Katherine Lindsay	January 9, 1956
50	50	"One Left Over"	Unknown	Robert Howard Lindsay	January 10, 1956
51	51	"All The Trees In The Field"	Alan Neuman	Sylvia Richards	January 11, 1956
52	52	"Mr.Candido"	Unknown	Walt Anderson	January 12, 1956
53	53	"Friday The 13th"	Allan Buckhantz	Sumner Locke Elliott	January 13, 1956
54	54	"The Old Maid"	Lamont Johnson	Story by : Edith Wharton; Teleplay by : Zoe Akins	January 16, 1956
55	55	"Mother Was A Bachelor"	Unknown	Story by : Myna Lockwood; Teleplay by : Irving W. Phillips	January 17, 1956
56	56	"The Bottom Of The River"	Unknown	Arnold Schulman	January 18, 1956
57	57	"Company Manners"	Unknown	Story by : Sumner Locke Elliott; Teleplay by : William McCleery	January 19, 1956
58	58	"The Child And The Muse"	Unknown	Greer Johnson	January 20, 1956
59	59	"The Big Box"	Boris Sagal	Arnold M. Auerbach	January 23, 1956
60	60	"Sincerely Yours, Charlie Fisher"	Unknown	Donald Symington and Dean Harens	January 24, 1956
61	61	"Doc"	Unknown	Berry Grove	January 25, 1956
62	62	"The Amateur"	Unknown	Mort Thaw	January 26, 1956
63	63	"Light and Shadow"	Unknown	Glenn P. Wolfe and Elaine Wolfe	January 27, 1956
64	64	"Romney"	Unknown	Story by : A.L. Barker; Teleplay by : Lois Landauer	January 30, 1956
65	65	"O Promise Me"	Unknown	Greer Johnson	January 31, 1956
66	66	"Hold My Hand And Run"	Unknown	Jeanette and Francis Letton	February 1, 1956
67	67	"Dark Possession"	Lamont Johnson	Gore Vidal	February 2, 1956
68	68	"The Diamond"	Boris Sagal	David Chandler	February 3, 1956
69	69	"Susan And God"	Walter Grauman	Story by : Rachel Crothers; Teleplay by : Lawrence Hazard	February 6, 1956
70	70	"As Young As You Feel"	Unknown	Story by : Virginia Faulkner; Teleplay by : Lois Jacoby	February 7, 1956
71	71	"The White Knight"	Unknown	Jack Laird	February 8, 1956
72	72	"The Anxious Years"	Unknown	Story by : Thyra Samter Winslow; Teleplay by : Kathleen and Robert Howard Lindsay	February 9, 1956
73	73	"The Heart Of Mary Lincoln"	Unknown	Story by : Mary W. Ballard; Teleplay by : Kathleen and Robert Howard Lindsay	February 10, 1956
74	74	"The Middle Son"	Unknown	Nicolas Baehr	February 13, 1956
75	75	"Valentine's Day"	Unknown	Virginia Rooks	February 14, 1956
76	76	"Summer Cannot Last"	Unknown	Story by : Diana Tutton; Teleplay by : Elizabeth Hart	February 15, 1956
77	77	"The Last Battlefield"	Unknown	Harold Callen	February 16, 1956
78	78	"The Catbird Seat"	Sherman Marks	Story by : James Thurber; Teleplay by : Robert J. Shaw	February 17, 1956
79	79	"Dream House"	Unknown	Arthur Cavanaugh	February 20, 1956
80	80	"The Runaways"	Unknown	Alfred Brenner	February 21, 1956
81	81	"The Ledger"	Unknown	Jack Laird	February 22, 1956
82	82	"When The Bough Breaks"	Unknown	Michele Cousin	February 23, 1956
83	83	"I Want To March"	Unknown	Hoffman R. Hays	February 24, 1956
84	84	"Skylark"	Arthur Hiller	Story by : Lawrence Hazard; Teleplay by : Sam Raphaelson	February 27, 1956
85	85	"Tall, Dark Stranger"	Unknown	Peter Barry	February 28, 1956
86	86	"Anything But Love"	Unknown	William McCleery	February 29, 1956
87	87	"Robin Daw"	Unknown	Ira Avery	March 1, 1956
88	88	"Letter To A Stranger"	Boris Sagal	Story by : Elswyth Thane; Teleplay by : Helene Hanff	March 2, 1956
89	89	"Dinner At Antoine's"	Allan Buckhantz	Story by : Frances Parkinson Keyes; Teleplay by : Samuel W. Taylor	March 5, 1956
90	90	"The Mating Of Watkins Tottle"	Lamont Johnson	Story by : Charles Dickens; Teleplay by : William Kozlenko & Meyer Dolinsky	March 6, 1956
91	91	"Her Son's Wife"	Unknown	Story by : Claire Wallis; Teleplay by : Peggy Phillips	March 7, 1956
92	92	"The Shining Place"	Unknown	Peggy Phillips	March 8, 1956
93	93	"The Odd Ones"	Livia Granito	Betty Ulius	March 9, 1956
94	94	"A Cowboy For Chris"	Unknown	Walter Black and William Mendrek	March 12, 1956
95	95	"The Rocking Chair"	Unknown	Story by : Bob Barbash; Teleplay by : Anthony Spinner	March 13, 1956
96	96	"The Big Guy"	Unknown	Leonard Freeman	March 14, 1956
97	97	"Statue Of Limitations"	Unknown	A.J. Russell	March 15, 1956
98	98	"The Baron And The Banshees"	Unknown	Story by : Seamus White; Teleplay by : Jack Laird	March 16, 1956
99	99	"Notebook Warrior"	Unknown	Ira Levin	March 19, 1956
100	100	"Temptation For A King"	Unknown	Story by : John Secondari; Teleplay by : Michael Dyne	March 20, 1956
101	101	"The Antidote"	Unknown	Richard McCracken	March 21, 1956
102	102	"Shadows"	Unknown	Jane and Ira Avery	March 22, 1956
103	103	"'M' Is For The Many..."	Livia Granito	Joan Cunningham	March 23, 1956
104	104	"Silent Partner"	Unknown	Joseph Liss	March 26, 1956
105	105	"Winter In April"	Unknown	Story by : Robert Nathan; Teleplay by : Helene Hanff	March 27, 1956
106	106	"Bread Upon The Waters"	Unknown	Story by : Ray Lukshis; Teleplay by : Nicholas E. Baehr and Irwin Shaw	March 28, 1956
107	107	"The Giant Killer"	Unknown	Joseph K. Caldwell	March 29, 1956
108	108	"The Book Of Ruth"	Lamont Johnson	Howard Rodman	March 30, 1956
109	109	"Singer In The Valley"	Unknown	Story by : Dorothy Rood Stewart; Teleplay by : Helene Hanff	April 1, 1956
110	110	"The Heart Of A Husband"	Unknown	Story by : Margaret Culkin Banning; Teleplay by : Mort Thaw	April 3, 1956
111	111	"From The Desk Of Margaret Tydings"	Boris Sagal	Story by : Blanche Gregory; Teleplay by : Robert Esson	April 4, 1956
112	112	"But You Look Like Sisters"	Unknown	Story by : Fannie Hurst; Teleplay by : Lois Jacoby	April 5, 1956
113	113	"The House Of Seven Gables"	Allan Buckhantz	Story by : Nathaniel Hawthorne; Teleplay by : Elihu Winer	April 6, 1956
114	114	"Fiddlin' Man"	Lamont Johnson	Story by : William Brandon; Teleplay by : Dale Wasserman	April 9, 1956
115	115	"The Hollow Woman"	Unknown	Bruce Kimes	April 10, 1956
116	116	"People In Glass Houses"	Unknown	Kathleen and Robert Howard Lindsay	April 11, 1956
117	117	"One Of The Family"	Unknown	S.S. Schweitzer	April 12, 1956
118	118	"Young Hands, Young Feet"	Unknown	Steve Gethers	April 13, 1956
119	119	"The Lark Shall Sing"	Unknown	Story by : Elizabeth Cadell; Teleplay by : Peggy Phillips	April 16, 1956
120	120	"The Doctor's Wife"	Unknown	Story by : Nella Gardner White; Teleplay by : Nicholas E. Baehr	April 17, 1956
121	121	"In Dread Of Winter"	Unknown	Jess Greg	April 18, 1956
122	122	"The Babylonian Heart"	Unknown	Story by : Robert Arthur; Teleplay by : Henry Misrock	April 19, 1956
123	123	"Ask Me No Questions"	Unknown	Max Wilk	April 20, 1956
124	124	"Whom Death Has Joined Together"	Boris Sagal	Alvin Sapinsley	April 23, 1956
125	125	"Tin Wedding"	Unknown	Hagar Wilde and Judson O'Donnell	April 24, 1956
126	126	"The Reckoning"	Unknown	Daniel Morgan	April 25, 1956
127	127	"A Woman Named Ruby"	Unknown	Story by : Isabella Taves; Teleplay by : Doris Gilbert and Christie Munro	April 26, 1956
128	128	"The Bright Boy"	Unknown	John Bouruff	April 27, 1956
129	129	"The Carefree Tree"	Unknown	Story by : Aldyth Morris; Teleplay by : Helene Hanff	April 30, 1956
130	130	"Greybeards and Witches"	Unknown	Robert Easton	May 1, 1956
131	131	"The Legend Of Jenny Lind"	Walter Grauman	Irve Tunick	May 2, 1956
132	132	"Daughter Of The Seventh"	Unknown	S.S. Schweitzer	May 3, 1956
133	133	"Night Must Fall"	Sherman Marks	Emlyn Williams	May 4, 1956
134	134	"The 25th Hour"	Unknown	Dorothy Tyler and James Blumgarten	May 7, 1956
135	135	"A Man And A Maid"	Unknown	Therese Lewis	May 8, 1956
136	136	"Perspective"	Unknown	Hoffman R. Hays	May 9, 1956
137	137	"The Catamaran"	Unknown	J.P. Miller	May 10, 1956
138	138	"Johnny Came Marching Home"	Unknown	Anthony Spinner	May 11, 1956
139	139	"A Family Affair"	Unknown	Henry Misrock	May 14, 1956
TBA	TBA	"Statue of Limitations"	Unknown	Story by : A.J. Russell; Teleplay by :	May 15, 1956
140	140	"Blind Date"	Unknown	Joan Cunningham	May 16, 1956
141	141	"To Have And To Hold"	Unknown	Story by : Irving Elman; Teleplay by : Wilton Schiller	May 17, 1956
142	142	"Edwina Black"	Unknown	Story by : William Dinner & William Morum; Teleplay by : Warner Law	May 18, 1956
143	143	"The Spare Room"	Unknown	Story by : Nelia Gardner White; Teleplay by : Peggy Phillips	May 21, 1956
144	144	"The Bottle Imp"	Livia Granito	Story by : Robert Louis Stevenson; Teleplay by : Bill Templeton	May 22, 1956
145	145	"Brief Music"	Unknown	Story by : Emmet Lavery; Teleplay by : Irving Phillips	May 23, 1956
146	146	"The Girl From Boro Park"	Unknown	Albert Meglin	May 24, 1956
147	147	"To Whom It May Concern"	Unknown	Ralph Rose Jr.	May 25, 1956
148	148	"Bachelor Buttons"	Unknown	Michelle Cousin	May 28, 1956
149	149	"The Children Of Papa Juan"	Unknown	Story by : Guy de Maupassant; Teleplay by : Robert Claborne	May 29, 1956
150	150	"Herself Alone"	Unknown	Story by : Charles Mergendahl; Teleplay by : Roger Marston	May 30, 1956
151	151	"Three For The Money"	Unknown	Story by : James McConnaughey; Teleplay by : Jack Laird	May 31, 1956
152	152	"Taxi To The Moon"	Unknown	Sheppard Kerman	June 1, 1956
153	153	"The Good-Time Boys"	Unknown	Story by : Jane and Ira Avery; Teleplay by : Nicholas E. Baehr	June 4, 1956
154	154	"The American"	Pace Woods	Story by : Henry James; Teleplay by : Michael Dyne	June 5, 1956
155	155	"The Luck Of Amos Currie"	Unknown	Katherine Lindsay and Robert Howard Lindsay	June 6, 1956
156	156	"Fight The Whole World"	Allan Buckhantz	Caleb Gray	June 7, 1956
157	157	"Autumn Crocus"	Unknown	Story by : C.L. Anthony; Teleplay by : Elizabeth Hart	June 8, 1956
158	158	"George Has A Birthday"	Unknown	Jean Clifford Raymond	June 11, 1956
159	159	"The Serpent's Tooth"	Unknown	B.M. Atkinson Jr.	June 12, 1956
160	160	"Crime At Blossom's"	Unknown	Story by : Mordaunt Shairp; Teleplay by : Jerome Ross	June 13, 1956
161	161	"Cause For Suspicion"	Unknown	Story by : Peggy Lamson; Teleplay by : Joseph Liss	June 14, 1956
162	162	"Alison's House"	Unknown	Story by : Susan Glaspell; Teleplay by : Richard McCracken	June 15, 1956
163	163	"A Safe Place"	Unknown	Story by : Melba Marlett; Teleplay by : S.S. Schweitzer	June 18, 1956
164	164	"The Guest Cottage"	Unknown	William McCleery	June 19, 1956
165	165	"Forsaking All Others"	Unknown	Story by : Alice Duer Miller; Teleplay by : Barbara Kay Davidson and Peggy Phillips	June 20, 1956
A chronicle of what happens when circumstances bring together a beautiful woman and a handsome man, each of whom is married to an invalid. Note: Based on the novel of the same name by Alice Duer Miller
166	166	"Love, Honor And O'Day"	Unknown	Eileen Mason and Robert Mason Pollock	June 21, 1956
A light hearted story of a sponsor's wife who tries to reunite the TV man-and-wife team of Johnny and Amanda O'Day for her husbands sponsors.
167	167	"The Damask Cheek"	Unknown	Story by : John Van Druten and Lloyd Morris; Teleplay by : Theodore Apstein	June 22, 1956
The story of a young woman who comes to visit relatives in this country and winds up in the middle of two romances being carried on by her two cousins. Note: Based on the Play of the same name by John Van Druten and Lloyd Morris
168	168	"The Lighted Window"	Lamont Johnson	Story by : Pearl S. Buck; Teleplay by : Betty Ulius	June 25, 1956
An unhappily married New York executive's wife involves herself in the romantic and financial problems of an artist. Note: Based on the short story "Moon Over Manhattan" by Pearl S. Buck
169	169	"But Fear Itself"	Unknown	Story by : Stuart Hawkins; Teleplay by : Martin Grupsmith	June 26, 1956
An ex film star comes out of 14 years retirement to appear on a television show.
170	170	"The Birthday Present aka Red Letter Day"	Unknown	Andrew Rosenthal	June 27, 1956
An attractive wife's world falls apart.
171	171	"The Ghost Of Greenwich Village"	Boris Sagal	Story by : Elsie Milnes; Teleplay by : Robert Esson	June 28, 1956
Note: Based on the Novel by Elsie Milnes
172	172	"The Young And The Damned"	Walter Grauman	Story by : Roy Hargrave and Kenneth Phillips Britton; Teleplay by : Warner Law	June 29, 1956
A college boy's efforts to cover up his murder of an off-campus bad girl who accuses him fathering her expected child. Note: Based on the play "Houseparty" by Roy Hargrave & Kenneth Phillips Britton
173	173	"There's Always Juliet"	Arthur Hiller	Story by : John Van Druten; Teleplay by : Helene Hanff	July 2, 1956
A young Englishwoman is swept off her feet by the attentions of a handsome American. But he doubts that their sudden love can be real or lasting. Note: Based on the play of the same name by John Van Druten
174	174	"Seasoned Timber"	Allan Buckhantz	Story by : Dorothy Canfield Fisher; Teleplay by : Elihu Winer	July 3, 1956
The principal of a Vermont Academy opposes one of the school's trustees who wants to alter the curriculum in order to make the academy more exclusive. Note: Based on a Novel by Dorothy Canfield Fisher
175	175	"The Declaration"	Unknown	Stephen R. Callahan and John Vlahos	July 4, 1956
The aristocratic father of a young man decries the Declaration of Independence and such 'rebels' as Franklin, Jefferson and Adams. Loyal to the king, the father orders his son out of the house when the young man persists in his radical ideas
176	176	"The High Places"	Unknown	Roger Garis	July 5, 1956
A newspaper editor feels that his principles are being compromised by his publisher's policies. But when it comes to his private life, he is knee high-principled.
177	177	"Black Chiffon"	Unknown	Story by : Leslie Storm; Teleplay by : Phillip Barry Jr.	July 6, 1956
Two days before the marriage of her son, a woman who has an absolutely untarnished reputation unaccountably steals a black chiffon nightgown. Note: Based on a play by Leslie Storm
178	178	"Class Of '58"	Unknown	Louis S. Peterson	July 9, 1956
A college freshman is expelled from school and is returning home to uncertainty when he meets a business man who changes his life.
179	179	"Marriage By The Millions"	Unknown	George Lowther	July 11, 1956
A successful woman marriage counselor's husband asks for a divorce.
180	180	"Backfire"	Unknown	Marc Brandel	July 12, 1956
A fame-seeking professor and the lawyer suitor of his daughter feel guilty over a murder suspect.
181	181	"The Bishop Misbehaves"	Unknown	Story by : Frederick Jackson; Teleplay by : Kay Arthur	July 13, 1956
An English Bishop finds himself in the middle of a robbery. Note: Based on the play of the same name by Frederick J. Jackson
182	182	"The Remittance Man"	Unknown	James Elward	July 16, 1956
An imaginative old man's fanciful anecdotes change the lives of the family with whom he boards.
183	183	"Beg, Borrow or Steal"	Unknown	Jay Presson Allen	July 17, 1956
A respected attorney's career of embezzlement catches up with him on the eve of his daughter's marriage to his junior law partner.
184	184	"Summer Pavilion"	Unknown	Gore Vidal	July 18, 1956
An outwardly docile Southern girl who falls in love with the engineer who is tearing up the heirloom summer house of her matriarchal mother.
185	185	"The Feast"	Unknown	Story by : Margaret Kennedy; Teleplay by : Hoffman R. Hays	July 19, 1956
The story of the life of the eccentric residents of a guest house perched on the edge of a cliff. Note: Based on the Novel of the same name by Margaret Kennedy
186	186	"The Rich Full Life"	Unknown	Story by : Vina Delmar; Teleplay by : Jack Paritz	July 20, 1956
A wife in a humdrum marriage battles her husband and her husband's family to save her daughter from a similar fate. Note: Based on the play of the same name by Vina Delmar
187	187	"The Reverberator"	Arthur Hiller	Story by : Henry James; Teleplay by : Lois Jacoby	July 23, 1956
A Parisian family is exploited by the American tabloids and causes a scandal. Note: Based on the novel of the same name by Henry James
188	188	"Woman At The Window"	Walter Grauman	Story by : Nelia Gardner White; Teleplay by : Nicolas E. Baehr	July 24, 1956
A young woman is about to free herself from the limitation of her charming sister when tragedy turns the latter into a dependent invalid.
189	189	"Another Sky"	Alan Cooke	Story by : Naomi Lane Babson; Teleplay by : Betty Ulius	July 25, 1956
A young girl's silent adoration of first a missionary, then a sea captain finally brings her fulfillment of her dreams.
190	190	"Letter Of Introduction"	Unknown	Story by : James Carhartt and Nicolas Winter; Teleplay by : William Templeton	July 26, 1956
The story of an American divorcee, transplanted to Paris who receives a letter stating that she is about to be visited by a young man who doesn't know she is his mother.
191	191	"Home At Seven"	Unknown	Story by : R.C. Sherriff; Teleplay by : S.S. Schweitzer	July 27, 1956
A bank employee suffers a 24-hour lapse of memory. Note: Based on the play of the same name by R.C. Sherriff
192	192	"The Cypress Tree"	Unknown	Robert J. Shaw	July 30, 1956
The story of a recently widowed woman's determination to rebuild her own life despite her sister's strange insistence on mournful respect for the dead.
193	193	"Belong To Me"	Livia Granita	Story by : Ann Pinchot; Teleplay by : Gail Ingram	July 31, 1956
A young governess to a child whose parents are divorced is attracted to the father. Note: Based on an unpublished novelette "Love Wears A Golden Crown" by Ann Pinchot
194	194	"Pygmalion Jones"	Unknown	Story by : Dorothy Kilgallen and Richard Kollmar; Teleplay by : Gail Ingram Clement	August 1, 1956
The story of an accidental photograph that catapults an obscure young woman from school teacher to pin-up girl and playgirl.
195	195	"Gretel"	Lamont Johnson	Vance Bourjaily	August 2, 1956
A young boy marries an Immigrant girl then must explain to his parents his reasons.
196	196	"Some Man Will Want You"	Unknown	Story by : Margaret Culkin Banning; Teleplay by : Helene Hanff	August 3, 1956
A girl is tossed into the tension of a presidential nominating convention.
197	197	"The Fall Of The House Of Usher"	Boris Sagal	Story by : Edgar Allan Poe; Teleplay by : Robert Esson	August 6, 1956
A friend pays a visit to a man who lives in a sinister, dark mansion. The day he arrives, his host's sister is taken mysteriously ill and is not seen again. Note: Based on the short story of the same name by Edgar Allan Poe
198	198	"Cupid Road A Horse"	Unknown	B.M. Atkinson Jr.	August 7, 1956
Grandpa Hoyt will be sent back to Iowa if he doesn't stop betting on the horses. The old man's grandsons want to keep him around, so they try and fix him up with wealthy Mrs. Conkwright.
199	199	"The Old Payola"	Unknown	Abby Mann and Jack Wilson	August 8, 1956
A crooner turns rock 'n' roll hipster at his manager's request to pick up a fast buck.
TBA	TBA	"The Century Plant"	Albert McCleery	Story by : Theodore Apstein; Teleplay by :	August 9, 1956
200	200	"The Perfect Alibi"	Unknown	Story by : A.A. Milne; Teleplay by : Nikki Justin and William Noble	August 10, 1956
The young ward of a man whom police believe committed suicide, sets out to prove that it was murder.

=== Season 2 (1956-57) ===
No. overall	No. in season	Title	Directed by	Written by	Original release date
201	1	"The House On 5th Avenue"	Sherman Marks	Henry Misrock	August 28, 1956
202	2	"Yankee Doodler"	Arthur Hiller	Allen Swift	August 29, 1956
203	3	"The Pink Hippopotamus"	Allan Buckhantz	Story by : Robert G. Deindorfer; Teleplay by : Adrian Spies	August 30, 1956 (Note: Broadcast a second time after the Hungarian revolution, because of its relevance.)
Thriller about refugees from communist Europe.
204	4	"September Tide"	Laurence Schwab Jr.	Story by : Daphne du Maurier; Teleplay by : Richard McCracken	September 3, 1956
205	5	"Are You Listening?"	Unknown	Jack Laird	September 3, 1956
The story of a young jazz musician who learns that note-by-note imitation is not the way to perpetuate the memory of his famous musician father
206	6	"The Lady's Maid's Bell"	Unknown	Story by : Edith Wharton; Teleplay by : Robert Esson	September 4, 1956
207	7	"One Hundred Red Convertibles"	Unknown	Roger Garis	September 5, 1956
208	8	"The Ivy Curtain"	Albert McCleery	Anthony Spinner	September 6, 1956
209	9	"Gramercy Ghost"	Arthur Hiller	Story by : John Cecil Holm; Teleplay by : Richard McCracken	September 7, 1956
210	10	"The Lovers"	Unknown	Marion C. Baker	September 10, 1956
211	11	"Reach For The Stars"	Unknown	B.L. Hunter	September 11, 1956
212	12	"I Like It Here"	Sherman Marks	A.B. Shiffrin	September 12, 1956
213	13	"A Question Of Balance"	Unknown	Story by : Stuart Dunham; Teleplay by : Wood Fitchette	September 13, 1956
214	14	"Marriage Royal"	Unknown	Robert Wallsten	September 14, 1956
215	15	"Mad Money"	Unknown	Story by : Max Wilk, Lee Rogow, and Dick Lewine; Teleplay by : Max Wilk	September 19, 1956
216	16	"A Letter From Johnny Brack"	Unknown	Story by : Sophie Kerr; Teleplay by : Harold Callen	September 20, 1956
217	17	"Uncle Harry"	Unknown	Thomas Job	September 21, 1956
TBA	TBA	"The Starmaster"	Unknown	Story by : Will Schneider and Herman Goldberg; Teleplay by :	September 23, 1956
218	18	"At Mrs. Leland's"	Unknown	Story by : Fannie Hurst; Teleplay by : Elizabeth Hart	September 24, 1956
219	19	"The House Next Door"	Unknown	Story by : Vera Blackwell; Teleplay by : William Templeton	September 25, 1956
220	20	"The Alumni Reunion"	Boris Sagal	Nicholas E. Baehr	September 26, 1956
221	21	"Sound Of Fear"	George Cahan	Bill Barrett	September 27, 1956
222	22	"Late Date"	Unknown	William Kendall Clarke	September 28, 1956
223	23	"Pride & Prejudice"	Sherman Marks	Story by : Jane Austen; Teleplay by : Helene Hanff	October 1, 1956
224	24	"The Pearls Of Sheba"	Unknown	Story by : Vivian Cornell; Teleplay by : Henry Misrock	October 2, 1956
225	25	"The Stamp Caddy"	Unknown	Hal Hackady	October 15, 1956
226	26	"The Egoist"	Lamont Johnson	Story by : George Meredith; Teleplay by : Richard McCracken	October 16, 1956
227	27	"The Family Man"	Unknown	William McCleery	October 17, 1956
228	28	"Sight Unseen"	Unknown	Story by : Rosemary Foster and Warner Law; Teleplay by : Warner Law	October 18, 1956
229	29	"The Eye Of The Storm"	Sherman Marks	Norman Jacob	October 19, 1956
230	30	"Man In Seven League Boots"	Unknown	Anthony Spinner	October 22, 1956
231	31	"Woman Across The Hall"	Unknown	Robert Wallsten	October 23, 1956
232	32	"And Then There Were Three"	Unknown	S.V.P. Rand	October 24, 1956
233	33	"Shake The Stars Down"	Unknown	Story by : Pamela Frankau; Teleplay by : Gail Ingram	October 29, 1956
234	34	"Horsepower"	Sherman Marks	Mona Kent and Alfred Ryder	October 30, 1956
235	35	"Without Sanction"	Unknown	Story by : Hans Kades; Teleplay by : Theodore Apstein	October 31, 1956
236	36	"The Outing"	Unknown	Arnold Rabin	November 2, 1956
237	37	"Thank You, Edmondo"	Allan Buckhantz	Mac Shoub	November 5, 1956
238	38	"The Tell-Tale Heart"	Boris Sagal	Story by : Edgar Allan Poe; Teleplay by : William Templeton	November 6, 1956
239	39	"Strangers On A Honeymoon"	Unknown	Robert Freud Rodgers	November 7, 1956
240	40	"A Dram Of Poison"	Pace Woods	Story by : Charlotte Armstrong; Teleplay by : Henry Misrock	November 8, 1956
241	41	"The Shining Hour"	Sherman Marks	Story by : Keith Winter; Teleplay by : Richard McCracken	November 9, 1956
242	42	"Love, Marriage & Five Thousand Dollars"	Walter Grauman	Story by : Alfred Brenner; Teleplay by : Kathleen and Robert Howard Lindsay	November 12, 1956
243	43	"Step Into Darkness"	Unknown	Story by : Elizabeth Denham; Teleplay by : Betty Ulius	November 13, 1956
254	44	"A Candle In The Dark"	Unknown	Paul Tabori	November 14, 1956
245	45	"Savrola"	Albert McCleery	Story by : Winston Churchill; Teleplay by : Frank and Doris Hursley	November 15, 1956
246	46	"A Table Set At Night"	Unknown	Peter Berneis	November 16, 1956
247	47	"Madame De Treymes"	Walter Grauman	Story by : Edith Wharton; Teleplay by : William Templeton	November 19, 1956
248	48	"The People Vs. John Tarr"	Unknown	Eunice Luccock Corfman	November 20, 1956
249	49	"The Location Of Roycemore College"	Unknown	Malcolm Shaw and Dan Blue	November 21, 1956
250	50	"Dracula"	Lamont Johnson	Story by : Bram Stoker; Teleplay by : Robert Esson	November 23, 1956
251	51	"Cease From Anger"	Unknown	Eugene Francis	November 26, 1956
252	52	"The Empty Nest"	Unknown	Josephine Lawrence	November 27, 1956
253	53	"Spare Your Pity"	Unknown	C. Stafford Dickens	November 28, 1956
254	54	"The Last Leaf"	Unknown	Ross Claiborne and Frances Banks	November 30, 1956
255	55	"Therese"	Walter Grauman	Story by : Elizabeth Hart and Thomas Job; Teleplay by : Emile Zola	December 3, 1956
256	56	"The House Of Mirth"	Unknown	Edith Wharton	December 4, 1956
257	57	"Julie"	Unknown	David Davidson	December 5, 1956
258	58	"The Refugee"	Unknown	Story by : Thelma Nurenberg; Teleplay by : Nicholas E. Baehr	December 6, 1956
259	59	"Jenny Kissed Me"	Unknown	Story by : Jean Kerr; Teleplay by : Richard McCracken	December 7, 1956
260	60	"Miracle At Carville"	Unknown	Story by : Betty Martin; Teleplay by : William Mourne	December 10, 1956
261	61	"The Upper Hand"	Unknown	Story by : Nathaniel Benchley; Teleplay by : George Lowther	December 11, 1956
262	62	"Love Is A Locksmith"	Unknown	William McCleery	December 12, 1956
263	63	"Captain Brassbound's Conversion"	Boris Sagal	Story by : George Bernard Shaw; Teleplay by : Boris Segal	December 13, 1956
264	64	"The Wisp End"	Unknown	Richard Wendley	December 14, 1956
265	65	"Prominent Citizens"	Unknown	Story by : A.B. Shiffrin; Teleplay by : Richard Wendley	December 17, 1956
266	66	"Head Of The Family"	Unknown	S.S. Schweitzer	December 18, 1956
267	67	"The Password"	Unknown	Helen Cotton	December 19, 1956
268	68	"Late Love"	Unknown	Story by : Rosemary Casey; Teleplay by : Gail Ingram	December 20, 1956
269	69	"Eugene Grandet"	Unknown	Story by : Honore de Balzac; Teleplay by : Betty Ulius	December 21, 1956
270	70	"Cold Christmas"	Unknown	Story by : Anna Marie Barlow and S. Brooke White; Teleplay by : Theodore Apstein	December 24, 1956
271	71	"Little Women"	Unknown	Story by : Louisa May Alcott; Teleplay by : Elaine Ryan	December 25, 1956
272	72	"Sweetheart, Wife Or Mother"	Unknown	Story by : Lemora Mattingly Weber; Teleplay by : Helene Hanff	December 26, 1956
273	73	"Smilin' Thru"	Sherman Marks	Story by : Allan Langdon Martin; Teleplay by : Richard McCracken	December 27, 1956
274	74	"Strong Medicine"	Unknown	William Mourne	December 28, 1956
275	75	"Everything Is Relative"	Unknown	Dan Beaumont	December 31, 1956
276	76	"Miss Morissa"	Unknown	Story by : Mari Sandoz; Teleplay by : Helene Hanff	January 2, 1957
277	77	"The Scandalous Priest"	Unknown	Frank and Doris Hursley	January 3, 1957
278	78	"Dark Victory"	Walter Grauman	Story by : George Emerson Brewer Jr. and Bertram Block; Teleplay by : Kathleen Lindsay and Robert Howard Lindsay	January 4, 1957
279	79	"The Lonely Look"	Unknown	Herman Raucher	January 7, 1957
280	80	"The Sudden Truth"	Unknown	Charles Cagle	January 8, 1956
281	81	"The Man In Half-Moon Street"	Unknown	Story by : Barre Lyndon; Teleplay by : Kathleen Lindsay and Robert Howard Lindsay	January 9, 1957
282	82	"The Hex"	Unknown	Gene Feldman	January 10, 1956
283	83	"If This Be Error"	Unknown	Story by : Rachel Grieve; Teleplay by : William Kendall Clark	January 11, 1957
284	84	"On The Trail Of The Klingsfield"	Unknown	Philip Kalfur	January 14, 1957
285	85	"Here We Are"	Unknown	Sol Saks	January 15, 1957
286	86	"Arms And The Man"	Alan Cooke	George Bernard Shaw	January 16, 1957
287	87	"Home Is The Hunter"	Unknown	Howard Berk	January 17, 1957
288	88	"Madam Ava"	Unknown	Story by : Aurand Harris; Teleplay by : Richard McCracken	January 18, 1957
289	89	"The Outting"	Unknown	Arnold Rubin	January 21, 1957
290	90	"Night Train To Chicago"	Unknown	Franklin Barton	January 22, 1957
291	91	"This Language Called Love"	Unknown	Story by : Hila Colman; Teleplay by : Barbara Davidson	January 23, 1957
292	92	"The Thirteenth Crypt"	Unknown	Anthony Spinner	January 24, 1957
293	93	"Mr. Pim Passes By"	Unknown	Story by : A.A. Milne; Teleplay by : Warner Law	January 25, 1957
294	94	"Anything For A Laugh"	Unknown	Story by : Doris Gilbert; Teleplay by : Eve Greene	January 29, 1957
295	95	"The Realms Of Gold"	Unknown	Howard Lawrence Davis	January 30, 1957
296	96	"Deacon Of Oak Ridge"	Unknown	Story by : Teleplay by : Harold Gast	January 31, 1957
297	97	"Accent On Youth"	Unknown	Samson Raphaelson	February 1, 1957
298	98	"Three Kids"	Unknown	Martin Donovan	February 4, 1957
299	99	"Frankenstein"	Walter Grauman	Story by : Mary Shelley; Teleplay by : Robert Esson	February 5, 1957
300	100	"The Most Dangerous Man"	Unknown	Irving Richin	February 6, 1957
301	101	"One"	Unknown	David Karp	February 7, 1957
302	102	"The Importance Of Being Earnest"	Alan Cooke	Oscar Wilde	February 8, 1957
303	103	"The Brat's House"	Unknown	Roy Hargrave and Joseph Di Reda	February 11, 1957
304	104	"The Mysterious Mr. Todd"	Unknown	George Sumner Albee	February 12, 1957
305	105	"A Case Of Pure Fiction"	Unknown	Jerome Ross	February 13, 1957
306	106	"The Master Builder"	Sherman Marks	Henrik Ibsen	February 14, 1957
307	107	"The Others"	Unknown	Story by : Henry James; Teleplay by : Michael Dyne	February 15, 1957
308	108	"The Remarkable Mr. Jerome"	Unknown	Story by : Anita Leslie; Teleplay by : Helene Hanff	February 19, 1957
309	109	"Bobbie"	Unknown	Narda Stokes	February 20, 1957
310	110	"The Hickory Limb"	Unknown	Story by : Meade Roberts; Teleplay by : John Van Druten	February 21, 1957
311	111	"The Bridge"	Alan Hanson	Story by : Narda Stokes; Teleplay by : Joseph Caldwell	February 22, 1957
312	112	"The Serpent's Tooth"	Unknown	B.M. Atkinson Jr.	February 25, 1957
313	113	"Voyage To Mandok"	Livia Granito	Peter Barry	February 26, 1957
314	114	"The Day Before The Wedding"	Walter Grauman	Anthony Spinner	February 27, 1957
315	115	"Queen Of Spades"	Unknown	Story by : Alexander S. Pushkin; Teleplay by : Michael Dyne	February 28, 1957
316	116	"Shadow And Substance"	Unknown	Paul Vincent Carroll	March 1, 1957
317	117	"You Touched Me"	Unknown	Story by : Tennessee Williams; Teleplay by : Donald Windham	March 4, 1957
318	118	"The Hemlock Cup"	Alan Hanson	Story by : Edward Hunt; Teleplay by : Richard McCracken	March 5, 1957
319	119	"Papa's Wife"	Unknown	Story by : Thyra Ferre Bjorn; Teleplay by : Elizabeth Hart	March 6, 1957
320	120	"The Prizewinner"	Unknown	Jerome Ross	March 7, 1957
321	121	"Dr. Jekyll And Mr. Hyde"	Allan Buckhantz	Story by : Robert Louis Stevenson; Teleplay by : Robert Esson	March 8, 1957
322	122	"Yesterday’s Magic"	Unknown	Story by : Luigi Parandello; Teleplay by : Michael Dyne	March 14, 1957
323	123	"Tongue Of Silver"	Sherman Marks	Michael Dyne	March 15, 1957
324	124	"The Peaceable Kingdob"	Unknown	Arthur Arent	March 18, 1957
325	125	"The Nineteenth Hole"	Unknown	Story by : Frank Craven; Teleplay by : Warner Law	March 19, 1957
326	126	"Wedding Of The Family"	Unknown	Story by : Dale Fife; Teleplay by : Betty Ulius	March 20, 1957
327	127	"The Ways Of Courage"	Unknown	Will Lorin	March 25, 1957
328	128	"Journey Into Darkness"	Walter Grauman	Story by : Selwyn James; Teleplay by : Theodore Apstein	March 26, 1957
329	129	"Barricade At The Big Black"	Unknown	Story by : Terrence Kilpatrick; Teleplay by : Anthony Spinner	March 27, 1957
330	130	"The Vicarious Years"	Unknown	Story by : John Van Druten; Teleplay by : Peggy Lamson	March 28, 1957
331	131	"The First Year"	Unknown	Frank Craven	March 29, 1957
332	132	"End Of A Rope"	Alan Hanson	Sheldon Stark	April 1, 1957
333	133	"We Won't Be Any Trouble"	Unknown	Story by : John and Ward Hawkins; Teleplay by : George Lowther	April 2, 1957
334	134	"The Daughter Of Mata Hari"	Unknown	Story by : Kurt Singer; Teleplay by : Alvin Boretz	April 3, 1957
335	135	"Talk You Of Killing"	Unknown	Joe Barry	April 4, 1957
336	136	"The Pursuit Of Happiness"	Unknown	Lawrence Langner and Armina Marshall Langner	April 5, 1957
337	137	"Wuthering Heights"	Unknown	Story by : Emily Bronte; Teleplay by : Lois Jacoby	April 8, 1957
338	138	"The Long Distance"	Unknown	Story by : Reita Lambert; Teleplay by : George Lowther	April 9, 1957
339	139	"Point Of Clearing"	Unknown	Robert E. Thompson	April 10, 1957
340	140	"The Sport"	Unknown	Helene Hanff	April 11, 1957
341	141	"The Flashing Stream"	Unknown	Story by : Charles Morgan; Teleplay by : Kathleen Lindsay and Robert Howard Lindsay	April 12, 1957
342	142	"Thread That Runs So True"	Lamont Johnson	Harold Gast	April 15, 1957
343	143	"Jamie Picks A Wife"	Unknown	Story by : Gertrude Schweitzer; Teleplay by : Peggy Phillips	April 16, 1957
344	144	"Blind Man's Bluff"	Unknown	Story by : Nelia Gardner White; Teleplay by : Richard Wendley	April 17, 1957
345	145	"The Story Of Joseph"	Unknown	Howard Rodman	April 19, 1957
346	146	"The Pushover"	Sherman Marks	Story by : Harriet Frank Jr. Teleplay by : William McCleery	April 24, 1957
347	147	"Ashes In The Wind"	Walter Grauman	Mac Shoub	April 25, 1957
348	148	"A Hat, A Coat, A Glove"	Unknown	Story by : Wilhem Speyer; Teleplay by : Luther Reed and Monique Jean	April 26, 1957
349	149	"The Professional"	Unknown	Stan Cutler	April 29, 1957
350	150	"Guardians Of The Temple"	Lamont Johnson	Gene Feldman	April 30, 1957
351	151	"The Short Safari Of B'wana Ben"	Unknown	Story by : Stanley d. Schneider; Teleplay by : Nicholas E. Baehr	May 1, 1957
352	152	"Church On Sunday"	Unknown	Marjorie Duhan Adler	May 2, 1957
353	153	"The Gioconda Smile"	Boris Sagal	Story by : Aldous Huxley; Teleplay by : Anthony Spinner	May 3, 1957
354	154	"Show Of Strength"	Unknown	Herman J. Epstein	May 6, 1957
355	155	"Make-Believe Affair"	Unknown	Story by : Robert Standish; Teleplay by : George Lowther	May 7, 1957
356	156	"Hymn To The Dedicated"	Unknown	Mikhail Rykoff	May 8, 1957
357	157	"Thursday’s Child"	Unknown	Story by : Mary George Kochos; Teleplay by : Ellen McCracken	May 9, 1957
358	158	"Big Hearted Herbert"	Unknown	Story by : Sophie Kerr, A.J. Richardson, and Anna Steese Richardson; Teleplay by : Kay Arthur	May 10, 1957
359	159	"Embattled Maiden"	Unknown	Story by : Giraud Chester; Teleplay by : Betty Ulius	May 13, 1957
360	160	"The Middle-Aged Freshman"	Unknown	Story by : Samson Raphaelson; Teleplay by : Robert J. Shaw	May 14, 1957
361	161	"The Best Friend In Town"	Unknown	Theodore Apstein	May 15, 1957
362	162	"Jane Eyre"	Lamont Johnson	Story by : Charlotte Bronte; Teleplay by : Robert Esson	May 16, 1957
363	163	"Liza"	Unknown	Story by : Faith Baldwin; Teleplay by : Elsie Lee	May 17, 1957
364	164	"Aftermath"	Unknown	Howard Berk	May 20, 1957
365	165	"A Guest At The Embassy"	Unknown	Jerome Ross	May 21, 1957
366	166	"Second Hand Lover"	Unknown	George Lowther	May 22, 1957
367	167	"The Avenging Of Anne Leete"	Lamont Johnson	Story by : Marjorie Bowen; Teleplay by : Robert Esson	May 23, 1957
368	168	"Lonesome Husband"	Unknown	Story by : Phyllis Duganne; Teleplay by : Warner Law	May 24, 1957
369	169	"Puzzle In The Stars"	Unknown	Story by : David Eynon; Teleplay by : Harold Gast	May 27, 1957
370	170	"The Gwendolen Harleth Story"	Walter Grauman	Story by : George Eliot; Teleplay by : Elizabeth Hart	May 28, 1957
371	171	"Three Girls Named Almayna"	Unknown	Story by : Matt Taylor; Teleplay by : George Lowther	May 29, 1957
372	172	"The Dream That Was Fixed"	Unknown	Harry Julian Fink and Arthur Geller	May 30, 1957
373	173	"A Growing Wonder"	Unknown	Story by : Hildegarde Dolson; Teleplay by : Gail Ingram Clement	May 31, 1957
374	174	"Bachelor Father"	Unknown	Story by : Don Stanford; Teleplay by : Helene Hanff	June 3, 1957
375	175	"The Golden Door"	Unknown	Story by : Sylvia Regan; Teleplay by : Melba Redman	June 4, 1957
376	176	"Rain In The Morning"	Lamont Johnson	Story by : Marjorie Kellogg; Teleplay by : Paula Fox	June 5, 1957
377	177	"Rich Man, Poor Man"	Unknown	Story by : Lawrence Williams; Teleplay by : Theodore Apstein	June 10, 1957
378	178	"The Party Dress"	Unknown	Story by : Brenda Weisberg; Teleplay by : Ellen McCracken	June 11, 1957
379	179	"The White-Headed Boy"	Unknown	Lennox Robinson	June 12, 1957
380	180	"Sound Of Fear"	Unknown	Bill Barrett	June 13, 1957
381	181	"The Man With Pointed Toes"	Robert Ellis Miller	Helen Root and Lynn Root	June 17, 1957
382	182	"A Question Of Balance"	Unknown	Wood Fitchette and Stuart Dunham	June 18, 1957
383	183	"The Heart's Desire"	Unknown	Helene Hanff	June 19, 1957
TBA	TBA	"Pigeons and People"	TBA	Story by : George M. Cohan; Teleplay by : Joseph Schrank	TBA
TBA	TBA	"Things Hoped For"	TBA	Story by : Lula Vollmer; Teleplay by : Nicholas E. Baehr	TBA
384	184	"The Man Without A Country"	Lamont Johnson	Story by : Edward Everett Hale; Teleplay by : Elihu Winer	June 20, 1957
385	185	"Mr. Windigo"	Unknown	Story by : Charles Allen; Teleplay by : S.S. Schweitzer	June 21, 1957
386	186	"Stopover"	Unknown	Story by : Samson Raphaelson; Teleplay by : Richard Wendley	June 24, 1957
387	187	"A Light In The Sky"	Unknown	Story by : Jim Davis; Teleplay by : Harold Gast	June 25, 1957
388	188	"The Charmer"	Allan Buckhantz	Gertrude Schweitzer	June 26, 1957
389	189	"Brief Candle"	Unknown	Story by : Robert Hare Powell; Teleplay by : Richard McCracken	June 28, 1957
TBA	TBA	"Too Much Johnson"	Unknown	Story by : William Gilette; Teleplay by :	July 1, 1957
TBA	TBA	"Money In The Bank"	Unknown	Story by : Henry S. Maxfield; Teleplay by : George Lowther	July 2, 1957
TBA	TBA	"The Trouble Train"	Unknown	Story by : Ellen & Richard McCracken; Teleplay by :	July 3, 1957
390	190	"The Last Voyage"	Unknown	James Truex	July 4, 1957
TBA	TBA	"Price of Scandal"	Unknown	Story by : Harriet Frank, Jr. Teleplay by : Theodore Apstein	July 5, 1957
391	191	"...But When She Was Bad"	Lamont Johnson	Marjorie Duhan Adler	July 11, 1957
392	192	"The Fable Of Harry"	Unknown	Frank P. DeFellitta	July 12, 1957
TBA	TBA	"Portrait In Miniature"	Unknown	Story by : George Lowther; Teleplay by :	July 15, 1957
393	193	"The Cask Of Amontillado"	Walter Grauman	Story by : Edgar Allan Poe; Teleplay by : Robert Esson	July 16, 1957
394	194	"The Richest Man In The World"	Alan Cooke	Warner Law	July 17, 1957
TBA	TBA	"The Last Hour"	Unknown	Story by : Bob and Wanda Duncan; Teleplay by : Alvin Boretz	July 18, 1957
395	195	"The First Captain"	Unknown	Henry Misrock	July 22, 1957
396	196	"The Shuttered Heart"	Unknown	Story by : Mary Jane Waldo; Teleplay by : Ellen McCracken	July 24, 1957
397	197	"One For All"	John Barrymore Jr.	Story by : James Skardon; Teleplay by : Harold Gast	July 25, 1957
398	198	"Call It A Day"	Unknown	Dodie Smith	July 26, 1957
399	199	"Ann Veronica"	Walter Grauman	Story by : H.G. Wells; Teleplay by : Greer Johnson	July 29, 1957
400	200	"Boys Will Be Men"	Unknown	Harry W. Junkin	July 30, 1957
401	201	"The Forbidden Search"	Unknown	Story by : Don Stanford; Teleplay by : William M. Altman	July 31, 1957
402	202	"The Fawn"	Unknown	Lucille Duffy	August 1, 1957
403	203	"Sunday In Sonora"	Unknown	Story by : Jay Albert; Teleplay by : Sheldon Stark	August 2, 1957
404	204	"The Rose Bush"	Unknown	Blanche Hanalis	August 5, 1957
405	205	"Finley's Fan Club"	Unknown	Robert Dozier	August 6, 1957
406	206	"Laugh A Little Tear"	Alan Hanson	Story by : Gerald Sanford; Teleplay by : Robert E. Thompson	August 7, 1957
407	207	"The Invisible Man"	Larry Schwab	Story by : H.G. Wells; Teleplay by : Robert Esson	August 8, 1957
408	208	"Where Angels Fear To Tread"	Unknown	Story by : Edwin Rutt; Teleplay by : George Lowther	August 9, 1957
409	209	"First Love"	Unknown	Story by : Gertrude Schweitzer; Teleplay by : Ellen McCracken	August 13, 1957
410	210	"The Lost Survivors"	Unknown	Story by : Matt Taylor; Teleplay by : Richard Wendley	August 14, 1957
411	211	"Time For Action"	Unknown	Story by : David Lamson; Teleplay by : Greer Johnson	August 15, 1957
412	212	"Haven's End"	Unknown	Story by : John P. Marquand; Teleplay by : David Davidson	August 20, 1957
413	213	"Heed The Falling Sparrow"	Unknown	Story by : Sol Offsey; Teleplay by : Alvin Boretz	August 21, 1957
414	214	"The President's Child Bride"	Unknown	Story by : Leo Guild; Teleplay by : Abby Mann	August 22, 1957
415	215	"Now Or Never"	Unknown	Martha Wilkerson	August 23, 1957
416	216	"The Awakening"	Unknown	Richard Wendley	August 27, 1957
417	217	"Angel Face"	Unknown	Story by : Jean C. Beckett; Teleplay by : Mary McCarthy, Melville Burke, and Ellen McCracken	August 28, 1957
418	218	"The Star Sapphire"	Unknown	Story by : Ben Hecht and Charles Lederer; Teleplay by : Alvin Boretz	August 29, 1957
419	219	"Women Have Ways"	Unknown	Story by : David Lamson; Teleplay by : George Lowther	August 30, 1957

=== Season 3 (1957-58) ===
No. overall	No. in season	Title	Directed by	Written by	Original release date
420	1	"The Jewel Box"	Unknown	Dick Moore	September 2, 1957
421	2	"Molly Morgan"	Unknown	Story by : John Steinbeck; Teleplay by : Reginald Lawrence	September 3, 1957
422	3	"Woman Alone"	Unknown	Story by : Shelley Smith; Teleplay by : Elizabeth Hart	September 4, 1957
423	4	"Among Strangers"	Unknown	Carol Warner Gluck	September 5, 1957
424	5	"The Broom And The Groom"	Unknown	Story by : Kurtz Gordon; Teleplay by : Robert Emmett	September 6, 1957
425	6	"The Adjustable Mr. Willing"	Larry Schwab	Story by : Lucy Cores; Teleplay by : George Lowther	September 9, 1957
426	7	"Freedom Comes Later"	Unknown	Sidney Paine	September 10, 1957
427	8	"In The Fog"	Walter Grauman	Story by : Richard Harding Davis; Teleplay by : Robert Esson	September 11, 1957
428	9	"Son Of Thirty-Seven Fathers"	Unknown	Jack Lewis	September 12, 1957
429	10	"Hand-Me-Down"	Unknown	Helen Cotton	September 13, 1957
430	11	"Emma"	Alan Cooke	Story by : Jane Austen; Teleplay by : Helene Hanff	September 16, 1957
431	12	"The Personal Equation"	Unknown	Irving Gaynor Neiman	September 17, 1957
432	13	"Night Cry"	Unknown	Story by : William L. Stuart; Teleplay by : Robert E. Thompson	September 18, 1957
433	14	"Mysterious Disappearance"	Unknown	Story by : Jacob Hay; Teleplay by : George Lowther	September 19, 1957
434	15	"The Impersonal Touch"	Unknown	Story by : Oscar Schisgall; Teleplay by : Theodore Apstein	September 20, 1957
435	16	"The Story Of Sarah"	Unknown	Marjorie Duhan Adler	September 23, 1957
436	17	"The Waiting Swan"	Unknown	Will Schneider and Herman Goldberg	September 24, 1957
An aging playboy chief of a film studio is repudiated by his son for foiling his dissolute ways.
437	18	"One Mummy Too Many"	Unknown	Alvin Sapinsley	September 25, 1957
438	19	"Hearthstones"	Unknown	Story by : Bernice Kelly Harris; Teleplay by : Betty Ulius	September 26, 1957
439	20	"The Reluctant Heiress"	Unknown	Story by : Harriet Frank Jr. Teleplay by : Harold Gast	September 27, 1957
440	21	"Father Came Home"	Unknown	Story by : Robert Carson; Teleplay by : Warner Law	October 15, 1957
441	22	"Villa Of The Angels"	Unknown	Story by : Alec Coppel; Teleplay by : Robert Esson	October 16, 1957
442	23	"The Tone Of Time"	Lamont Johnson	Story by : Henry James; Teleplay by : Theodore Apstein	October 17, 1957
443	24	"Almost Any Man Will Do"	Unknown	Story by : Isabel Landis; Teleplay by : Ellen McCracken	October 18, 1957
444	25	"Sing For Me"	Alan Hanson	Jack Paritz	October 21, 1957
445	26	"Run For The Money"	Unknown	Frank D. Gilroy	October 22, 1957
446	27	"Crusade For Freedom"	Unknown	Unknown	October 23, 1957
TBA	TBA	"Lest We Forget"	TBA	Story by : Frank F. Bukvic; Teleplay by : Will Schneider and Herman Goldberg	TBA
447	28	"The Glass Hill"	Unknown	Story by : Kenneth Evans; Teleplay by : Sheldon Stark	October 24, 1957
448	29	"Out Of The Frying Pan"	Unknown	Story by : Francis Swann; Teleplay by : Frank Price	October 25, 1957
449	30	"The Last Stop"	Lamont Johnson	Story by : William McLeod Raine; Teleplay by : Anthony Spinner	October 28, 1957
450	31	"The Weak And The Strong"	Unknown	Albert Meglin	October 29, 1957
451	32	"Nine-Finger Jack"	Alan Cooke	Story by : Anthony Boucher; Teleplay by : Frank Price and George Lowther	October 30, 1957
452	33	"Elementals"	Walter Grauman	Story by : Stephen Vincent Benet; Teleplay by : Nicholas E. Baehr	October 31, 1957
453	34	"A Plummer In Paradise"	Unknown	Story by : I.A.R. White; Teleplay by : Theodore Apstein	November 1, 1957
454	35	"Something About A Dollar"	Unknown	Story by : James Gould Cozzens; Teleplay by : Harold Gast	November 4, 1957
455	36	"Return In Winter"	Unknown	Story by : Nathan Teitel; Teleplay by : S.S. Schweitzer	November 7, 1957
456	37	"Grandmama And The Grandfather Clock"	Unknown	Story by : Charles Collins; Teleplay by : Warner Law	November 8, 1957
457	38	"Aesop And Rhodope"	Dennis Patrick	Helene Hanff	November 11, 1957
458	39	"All Over The World"	Unknown	Story by : I.A.R. Wylie; Teleplay by : Betty Ulius	November 12, 1957
459	40	"The Ransom Of Sigmund Freud"	Livia Granito	Harold Callen	November 13, 1957
460	41	"Iris"	Alan Hanson	Arnold Rabin	November 14, 1957
461	42	"Remember Me Kindly"	Unknown	Sonya Roberts	November 15, 1957
462	43	"Embassy House"	Unknown	Bernard C. Schoenfeld	November 18, 1957
463	44	"Witness To Murder"	Unknown	Story by : Richard Stern; Teleplay by : Sheldon Stark	November 19, 1957
464	45	"The Johnson House"	Unknown	Donald Symington	November 20, 1957
465	46	"Out Of My Darkness"	Alan Hanson	Story by : Frank Hursley and Doris Hursley; Teleplay by : Theodore Apstein	November 21, 1957
466	47	"The Tender Leaves"	Unknown	Robert J. Shaw	November 22, 1957
467	48	"Cadenza"	Unknown	Story by : Philip Freund and Joel Ross; Teleplay by : Will Schneider and Herman Goldberg	November 25, 1957
468	49	"The Green Shores"	Lamont Johnson	Story by : C.P. Breen; Teleplay by : Michael Dyne	November 26, 1957
469	50	"A Question Of Balance"	Unknown	Story by : Stuart Dunham; Teleplay by : Wood Fitchette	November 27, 1957
470	51	"Daniel Webster And The Sea Serpent"	Alan Cooke	Story by : Stephen Vincent Benet; Teleplay by : George Lowther	November 29, 1957
471	52	"The Conversation Table"	Unknown	Story by : Marjorie Worthington; Teleplay by : Sam Hall	December 2, 1957
472	53	"The Man That Corrupted Hadleyburg"	Walter Grauman	Story by : Samuel Clemens; Teleplay by : Dale Wasserman	December 4, 1957
473	54	"A Cloud For Jeri"	Lamont Johnson	Mort Thaw	December 6, 1957
474	55	"The Consul"	Unknown	Story by : Richard Harding Davis; Teleplay by : Kathleen and Robert Howard Lindsay	December 9, 1957
475	56	"The Old Friend"	Unknown	Story by : Eugene Raskin; Teleplay by : Will Schneider and Herman Goldberg	December 10, 1957
476	57	"Give Me A Wand"	Unknown	Robert E. Thompson	December 11, 1957
TBA	TBA	"The Sure Thing"	TBA	Story by : George Loveridge; Teleplay by : George Lowther	TBA
477	58	"Black Sheep Son"	Unknown	Unknown	December 12, 1957
478	59	"Dark Of The Moon"	Albert McCleery	Howard Richardson and William Berney	December 13, 1957
479	60	"The Gift And The Giver"	Unknown	Story by : Nelia Gardner White; Teleplay by : Harold Gast	December 16, 1957
480	61	"No Time For Comedy"	Alan Cooke	S.N. Behrman	December 17, 1957
481	62	"A Gentleman Of Fortune"	Unknown	Story by : Stephen Vincent Benet; Teleplay by : Warner Law	December 18, 1957
482	63	"The Gentleman Caller"	Unknown	Story by : Veronica Parker Jones; Teleplay by : George Lowther	December 19, 1957
TBA	TBA	"The Tender Leaves"	Unknown	Story by : Robert J. Shaw; Teleplay by :	December 20, 1957
483	64	"In Twenty-Five Words Or Less"	Unknown	Story by : George Bradshaw; Teleplay by : Ellen McCracken	December 23, 1957
484	65	"Sara Crewe"	Livia Granito	Story by : Frances Hodgson Burnett; Teleplay by : Elizabeth Hart	December 24, 1957
485	66	"Amahl And The Night Visitors"	Unknown	Gian Carlo Menotti	December 25, 1957
486	67	"The Little Minister"	Livia Granito	Story by : J.M. Barrie; Teleplay by : Helene Hanff	December 26, 1957
487	68	"Daughter Of Kings"	Unknown	Story by : Lesley Conger; Teleplay by : Elaine Ryan	December 31, 1957
488	69	"Survival Kit"	Unknown	Story by : Joseph Stocker; Teleplay by : S.S. Schweitzer	January 2, 1958
489	70	"A House With Golden Streets"	Unknown	Bob Duncan and Wanda Duncan	January 3, 1958
490	71	"The European"	Lamont Johnson	Story by : Henry James; Teleplay by : Theodore Apstein	January 6, 1958
491	72	"The Collected Letters Of Mr. Sage"	Unknown	Story by : Robert John Corcoran; Teleplay by : Harold Gast	January 7, 1958
492	73	"Two-Picture Deal"	Unknown	George Bellak	January 8, 1958
493	74	"The Great Obstacle Courtship"	Unknown	Story by : Harlan Ware; Teleplay by : Greer Johnson	January 9, 1958
494	75	"A Chance To Die"	Unknown	Leonard Kantor and Robert Wallsten	January 10, 1958
495	76	"Home On The Range"	Unknown	Story by : Robert Carson; Teleplay by : George Lowther	January 13, 1958
496	77	"The Makropoulos Secret"	Unknown	Story by : Karl Capek; Teleplay by : Randal C. Burrell and Michael Dyne	January 14, 1958
497	78	"More Than A Man"	Unknown	Arthur W. Rabin	January 15, 1958
498	79	"Something Stolen, Something Blue"	Allan Buckhantz	William Mourne	January 16, 1958
499	80	"The Thunderbolt"	Unknown	Arthur Wing Pinero	January 17, 1958
500	81	"Daisy Mayme"	Unknown	George Kelly	January 20, 1958
501	82	"The Man Who Wanted To Hate"	Unknown	Story by : Jan Cox Speas; Teleplay by : Nicolas E. Baehr	January 21, 1958
502	83	"The Golden Fleecing"	Unknown	Lorenzo Semple Jr.	January 22, 1958
503	84	"Forever And Ever"	Unknown	Kathleen and Robert Howard Lindsay	January 23, 1958
504	85	"Decision"	Unknown	Story by : Joseph Cochran; Teleplay by : S.S. Schweitzer	January 24, 1958
505	86	"Soldier's Boy"	Richard Goode	Story by : James Warner Bellah; Teleplay by : Abby Mann	January 27, 1958
506	87	"The 10th Muse"	Unknown	Sam Hall	January 30, 1958
507	88	"Love Out Of Town"	Alan Hanson	William McCleery	January 31, 1958
508	89	"Cave-In"	Boris Segal	Jack Oleck	February 3, 1958
509	90	"The Iceman"	Albert McCleery	Anthony Spinner	February 4, 1958
510	91	"The Long, Long Laugh"	Unknown	Bernard Slade	February 5, 1958
511	92	"Charcoal Pink"	Unknown	Story by : Edward Emerson; Teleplay by : Sheldon Stark	February 10, 1958
512	93	"Monsieur Beaucaire"	Alan Cooke	Story by : Booth Tarkington; Teleplay by : S.S. Schweitzer	February 11, 1958
513	94	"Life Upon A Wicked Stage"	Unknown	Jerome Kern	February 12, 1958
514	95	"Without Fear Or Favor"	Unknown	H.R. Hays	February 13, 1958
515	96	"The Third Person"	Robert Ellis Miller	Story by : Henry James; Teleplay by : Warner Law	February 14, 1958
516	97	"Eden End"	Unknown	Story by : J.B. Priestley; Teleplay by : Greer Johnson	February 17, 1958
517	98	"Goodbye On Thursday"	Unknown	Story by : Mil Smith; Teleplay by : Harold Gast	February 20, 1958
518	99	"Marriage Of Convenience"	Unknown	Robert E. Thompson	February 24, 1958
519	100	"The Suicide Club"	Walter Grauman	Story by : Robert Louis Stevenson; Teleplay by : Robert Esson	February 25, 1958
520	101	"The 65th Floor"	Unknown	Story by : Newt Arnold; Teleplay by : Nicholas E. Baehr	February 26, 1958
521	102	"The Hickory Heart"	Unknown	Story by : Demma Oldham; Teleplay by : Greer Johnson	February 27, 1958
522	103	"The Devil’s Violin"	Unknown	Will Schneider and Herman Goldberg	February 28, 1958
523	104	"The Prophet Hosea"	Unknown	Marjorie Duhan Adler	March 3, 1958
524	105	"The Vigilante"	Walter Grauman	Story by : Thomas Thompson; Teleplay by : Anthony Spinner	March 4, 1958
525	106	"Wednesday's Child"	Unknown	Story by : Leopold Atlas; Teleplay by : Abby Mann	March 5, 1958
526	107	"Mrs. Moonlight"	Unknown	Story by : Benn W. Levy; Teleplay by : Lois Jacoby	March 7, 1958
527	108	"The Mask Of Venus"	Unknown	Story by : Nelia Gardner White; Teleplay by : Theodore Apstein	March 10, 1958
528	109	"With Love We Live"	Unknown	Will Schneider and Herman Goldberg	March 11, 1958
529	110	"You and I"	Unknown	Philip Barry	March 12, 1958
530	111	"Career Angel"	Unknown	Story by : Frank Price; Teleplay by : Gerard Murray	March 13, 1958
531	112	"The Contingent Fee"	Unknown	S.S. Schweitzer	March 14, 1958
532	113	"Anxious Night"	Unknown	Story by : George Lowther; Teleplay by : David Lamson	March 18, 1958
533	114	"On Approval"	Unknown	Story by : Frederick Lonsdale; Teleplay by : Guy de Vry	March 19, 1958
534	115	"Dandy Dick"	Unknown	Story by : Arthur Pinero; Teleplay by : Alan Cooke	March 20, 1958
535	116	"Hush, Mahala, Hush"	Unknown	Mac Shoub	March 21, 1958
536	117	"O'Rourke's House"	Unknown	Tim Kelly	March 25, 1958
537	118	"The Alleyway"	Unknown	Robert Esson	March 26, 1958
538	119	"The Vagabond"	Unknown	Story by : Colette; Teleplay by : Betty Ulius	March 27, 1958
539	120	"The Silver Spider"	Dennis Patrick	John W. Bloch and Robert Wallsten	March 28, 1958
540	121	"Design For Glory"	Unknown	Story by : Maxine Wood; Teleplay by : Harold Gast	April 1, 1958
541	122	"The Inspector General"	Sherman Marks	Story by : Nikolai Gogol; Teleplay by : Warner Law	April 2, 1958
542	123	"The Two Mrs. Carrolls"	Unknown	Story by : Martin Vale; Teleplay by : Alan Cooke	April 3, 1958
543	124	"The Velvet Glove"	Alan Hanson	Story by : Rosemary Carey; Teleplay by : Helen Taini	April 4, 1958
544	125	"The Lost Survivors"	Unknown	Unknown	April 7, 1958
545	126	"Death Takes A Holiday"	Unknown	Story by : Alberto Castella; Teleplay by : Michael Dyne and Walter Ferris	April 7, 1958
546	127	"Man Of The House"	Unknown	Story by : Carl Leo Glass and Ben Zavin; Teleplay by : Rosemary Foster	April 9, 1958
547	128	"A Case Of Fear"	Unknown	Will Schneider and Herman Goldberg	April 10, 1958
548	129	"Walk The Sky"	Unknown	George Lowther	April 11, 1958
549	130	"The Canterville Ghost"	Robert Ellis Miller	Story by : Oscar Wilde; Teleplay by : George Lowther	April 15, 1958
550	131	"Found Money"	Unknown	Leonard Stadd	April 17, 1958
551	132	"Washington Whispers Murder"	Unknown	Story by : Leslie Ford; Teleplay by : S.S. Schweitzer	April 18, 1958
552	133	"A Boy Grows Up"	Unknown	Story by : Dorothy R. Stewart; Teleplay by : Harold Gast	April 22, 1958
553	134	"The Phony Venus"	Unknown	Story by : George Bradshaw; Teleplay by : Robert Wallsten	April 23, 1958
554	135	"Some Blessed People"	Unknown	Story by : Jean Leslie; Teleplay by : Greer Johnson	April 24, 1958
555	136	"The Quiet Street"	Unknown	Story by : Zelda Popkin; Teleplay by : Theodore Apstein	April 25, 1958
556	137	"Great Big Guy"	Unknown	Biff McGuire	April 29, 1958
557	138	"It Came From Out Of Town"	Unknown	Story by : Robert Dozier; Teleplay by : Robert James	April 30, 1958
558	139	"Prosper's Old Mother"	Unknown	Story by : Bret Harte; Teleplay by : S.S. Schweitzer	May 1, 1958
559	140	"End Of A Sentence"	Unknown	Theodore Apstein	May 2, 1958
560	141	"Top Platter"	Unknown	Warner Law	May 6, 1958
561	142	"The Guest Of Quesnay"	Allan Buckhantz	Story by : Booth Tarkington; Teleplay by : Robert Esson	May 7, 1958
562	143	"Good Housekeeping"	Unknown	William McCleery	May 8, 1958
563	144	"Angel Street"	Walter Grauman	Story by : Patrick Hamilton; Teleplay by : Walter Grauman	May 9, 1958
564	145	"The Cause"	Albert McCleery	Rod Serling	May 12, 1958
565	146	"Much Ado About Nothing: Part 1"	Alan Cooke	Story by : William Shakespeare; Teleplay by : Alan Cooke	May 20, 1958
566	147	"Much Ado About Nothing: Part 2"	Alan Cooke	Story by : William Shakespeare; Teleplay by : Alan Cooke	May 21, 1958
567	148	"Day Of Discoveries"	Unknown	Sheldon Stark	May 22, 1958
568	149	"The Young And The Fair"	Unknown	N. Richard Nash	May 23, 1958
569	150	"The Riddle Of Mary Murray"	Livia Granito	Helene Hanff	May 27, 1958
570	151	"The Gardenia Bush"	Unknown	Bob Duncan and Wanda Duncan	May 28, 1958
571	152	"Button Button"	Allan Buckhantz	Story by : Nelson Bond; Teleplay by : Harold Gast	May 29, 1958
572	153	"Hands"	Unknown	Robert Esson	May 30, 1958
573	154	"The End Of The Season"	Unknown	Story by : Bernard Schubert; Teleplay by : S.S. Schweitzer	June 3, 1958
574	155	"Look Out For John Tucker"	Unknown	Story by : John and Ward Hawkins; Teleplay by : George Lowther	June 4, 1958
575	156	"The Road To Recovery"	Allan Buckhantz	Story by : Budd Schulberg; Teleplay by : Nicholas E. Baehr	June 5, 1958
576	157	"The Nightbird Crying"	Unknown	Jack Paritz	June 6, 1958
577	158	"The Story Of Marcia Gordon"	Dennis Patrick	Marjorie Duhan Adler	June 10, 1958
578	159	"Town In Turmoil"	Livia Granito	Story by : Burnham Carter; Teleplay by : George Lowther	June 11, 1958
579	160	"Washington Square"	Alan Cooke	Story by : Henry James; Teleplay by : Michael Dyne	June 12, 1958
580	161	"Course For Collision"	Walter Grauman	Arthur Hailey	June 13, 1958
