= Elizabeth Cadell =

British writer (1903–1989)

- Born: Violet Elizabeth Vandyke; 10 November 1903; Calcutta, British India
- Died: 9 October 1989 (aged 85); Portugal
- Other names: Elizabeth Cadell, Harriet Ainsworth
- Occupation: writer
- Years active: 1946–1987

Violet Elizabeth Cadell, née Vandyke (10 November 1903 – 9 October 1989) was a 20th-century British writer. She sometimes used the pseudonym, Harriet Ainsworth.

== Biography ==
Violet Elizabeth Vandyke was born and raised in Calcutta, British Raj, daughter of Elizabeth Lynch and Frederick Reginald Vandyke, a colonial officer. She later was educated in England. In 1928, she married Henry Dunlop Raymond Mallock "H.D.R.M." Cadell; they had two children. In 1960, she moved to Portugal, where she spent her last years.

== Writing ==
In Last Straw for Harriet (1947), Cadell writes a "social comedy of the first order, hilarious, gay and given just the right touch", according to The Courier-Journal. Her third novel, Gay Pursuit (1948), tells the story of an American woman who marries into a British family who live in Devonshire. Kirkus Reviews described the book as light entertainment. The movie rights for Gay Pursuit were purchased by Twentieth Century Fox for $27,000 in 1948 with Rex Harrison meant to be the main star. Later, it was decided that Harrison was "too old" to play the lead. Gene Tierney was also meant to star in the picture. Her next novel, River Lodge (1948), was called "a pleasant, gay book which grips the attention from start to finish" by The Age. Iris in Winter (1949) was considered a light, fun read by the Oakland Tribune.

In 1950, she published the humorous ghost story, Brimstone in the Garden. Elsa J. Radcliffe wrote in Gothic Novels of the Twentieth Century (1979) that the ghost in the novel was "one of the most amusing ghosts it has been my pleasure to meet". Cadell's next novel, Enter Mrs. Belchamber (1951), told the story of a young man who needs to rely on the help of the "grim" Mrs. Belchamber. Spring Green (1953) was called by The Observer an "unexpectedly good light romance of gentry, and Americans, love and mystery, in a remote English village". The Marshfield News-Herald called Crystal Clear (1953) a book that "belongs in the category of English feminine comedy". Around the Rugged Rock (1954) is set in Andalusia and is a light comedic romance. Money to Burn (1955) was reviewed by Virginia Jones for the Paducah Sun, which said, "If you want to start the New Year off in a spirit of utter good humor, read "Money to Burn"." Jones later reviewed The Lark Shall Sing (1955) and described it as a fun, easy read. This novel was adapted for an episode of NBC Matinee Theater in 1956. Shadows on the Water (1957) is a murder mystery set in Lisbon.

In 1960, her novel The Yellow Brick Road was chosen by the American Library Association as an "Interesting Adult Book of 1960 for Young People". The Yellow Brick Road is a story that has both suspense and fantasy elements. In 1961, she wrote Six Impossible Things which centered on the Wayne family who had already been featured in other stories by her. The Corner Shop (1967) had "intriguing" reviews, according to Ann Matthews in the Medina County Gazette. The Baltimore Sun praised The Corner Shop for its "brisk pace" and "crisp dialogue". The Golden Collar (1969) is another entertaining romantic story that Kirkus Reviews calls a "proper treat".

In The Past Tense of Love (1970), a young woman is reunited with her long lost mother in France. Marcia M. Baker in The Cincinnati Enquirer, wrote that The Past Tense of Love was "good for reading while under a hairdryer, or on the beach, or in a hammock". Cadell's twenty-fifth novel, The Friendly Air, was published in 1971 and was set in Portugal. A review in The Daily News-Journal called it an "engaging, fascinating, moving and romantically-mysterious" book. Home for the Wedding (1972) was reviewed by The Morning Call which called it "formula fiction by a veteran author who specializes in love stories". Library Journal found the plot of The Fledgling to be "implausible, but absorbing and entertaining".

Library Journal found The Marrying Kind (1980) to be a "witty tale" set in both England and Paris. A Lion In the Way (1982) is set in India and was recommended for most library collections by Library Journal. Library Journal called The Waiting Game (1985) a "deftly plotted story of misdirected love and unrealized relationships".

== Novels ==
=== Waynes of Wood Mount series ===
- The Lark Shall Sing or The Singing Heart (1955)
- The Blue Sky of Spring (1956)
- Six Impossible Things (1961)

=== Other novels ===
- My Dear Aunt Flora (1946)
- Last Straw for Harriet or Fishy, Said the Admiral (1947)
- Gay Pursuit (1948)
- River Lodge (1948)
- Iris in Winter (1949)
- Brimstone in the Garden (1950)
- Enter Mrs. Belchamber or The Frenchman and the Lady (1951)
- The Greenwood Shady (1951)
- Sun in the Morning (1951)
- Men and Angels (1952)
- Journey’s Eve ou Crystal Clear (1953)
- Spring Green (1953)
- When Gentlemen Go By or Around the Rugged Rock (1954)
- The Cuckoo in Spring (1954)
- Money to Burn (1955)
- Consider the Lilies (1955), as Harriet Ainsworth
- I Love a Lass (1956)
- Bridal Array (1957)
- Shadow on the Water (1957)
- Sugar Candy Cottage (1958)
- The Green Empress (1958)
- Death and Miss Dane (1959)
- Honey for Tea (1961)
- The Toy Sword or Language of the Heart (1962)
- Mixed Marriage: The Diary of a Portuguese Bride (1963)
- Letter to My Love (1963)
- Be My Guest (1964)
- Death Among Friends (1964)
- The Fox from his Lair (1965)
- The Corner Shop (1966)
- The Stratton Story or Mrs. Westerby Changes Course (1967)
- The Golden Collar (1969)
- The Friendly Air (1970)
- The Past Tense of Love (1970)
- Come Be My Guest (1971)
- Home for the Wedding (1971)
- The Haymaker (1972)
- Royal Summons (1972)
- Deck with Flowers (1973)
- The Fledgling (1975)
- Game in Diamonds (1976)
- Return Match (1976)
- Parson’s House (1977)
- The Round Dozen (1978)
- Family Gathering (1979)
- The Marrying Kind (1980)
- Any Two Can Play (1981)
- A Lion in the Way (1982)
- Remains to Be Seen (1983)
- The Waiting Game (1985)
- The Empty Nest (1986)
- Out of the Rain (1987)

=== Crime novels (partial list) ===
- Consider the Lilies (1955)
- Shadow on the Water (1958)
- Alice, Where are Thou? (1959)
- The Yellow Brick Road (1960)
- Canary Yellow (1965)
- The Fox From His Lair (1965)
- The Stratton Story (1967)
- Deck with Flowers (1989)
