= Gladys Schmitt =

American writer (1909–1972)

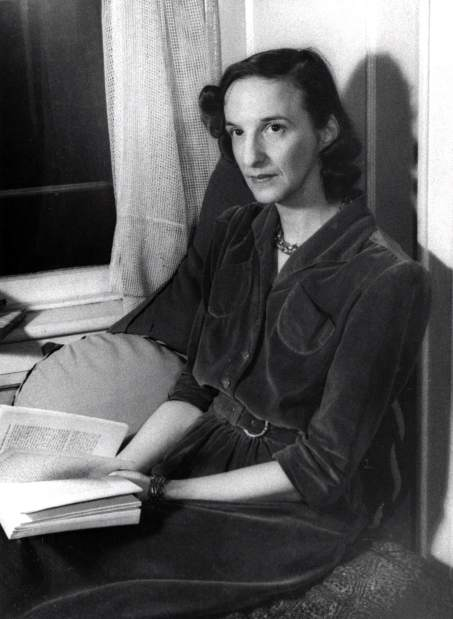
- Born: Gladys Leonore Schmitt; May 31, 1909; Pittsburgh, Pennsylvania
- Died: October 3, 1972 (aged 63); Pittsburgh, Pennsylvania
- Resting place: St. Peter's Lutheran Cemetery, Belmar, Pennsylvania
- Education: University of Pittsburgh, 1932
- Occupations: Author and professor
- Spouse: Simon Goldfield (1939-1972, her death)
- Writing career
- Genre: Fiction
- Notable works: The Gates of Aulis (1942); David the King (1946); Rembrandt (1961)
- Notable awards: Distinguished Daughter of Pennsylvania (1961); Ryan Award for Teaching, Carnegie Mellon University (1972)

Gladys Leonore Schmitt (May 31, 1909 in Pittsburgh, Pennsylvania – October 3, 1972 in Pittsburgh, Pennsylvania) was an American writer, editor, and professor.

Described by the Pittsburgh Sun-Telegraph in 1942 as one of the city's "literary lights, her second novel, David the King became a Literary Guild selection which rose to number one on national bestseller lists.

== Formative years ==
Born on Osceola Street in the Shadyside neighborhood of Pittsburgh, Pennsylvania on May 31, 1909, Gladys Schmitt was a daughter of Henry and Leonore (Link) Schmitt. As a student at Pittsburgh's Schenley High School, she wrote four plays. Subsequently enrolled at the Pennsylvania College for Women (now Chatham University), she transferred to the University of Pittsburgh after receiving a scholarship.

A member of Phi Beta Kappa, she graduated from Pitt in 1932.

On November 27, 1939, she married Simon Goldfield, whom she had met while attending Schenley High, and had one child, Betty Schmitt Culley, a niece whom they adopted.

== Literary career ==
In September 1929, Poetry Magazine published Schmitt's poem, Progeny."

Following her graduation from the University of Pittsburgh, Schmitt was hired as an editor for Scholastic Magazine, working from 1933 to 1942, first in Pittsburgh and then in New York. During this time, several of her short stories were published in Story and The Atlantic Monthly.

Employed from 1942 to 1972 at Carnegie-Mellon University, she rose to the rank of professor of English and fine arts. She was also responsible for founding the university's creative writing department in 1967.

It was during this period of her life that her novels were published. Her first, The Gates of Aulis, was released to the public in 1942. In October of that year, she presented a lecture about her novel to members of The Reviewers, a large book club associated with the Woman's Club of Mt. Lebanon in Mt. Lebanon, Pennsylvania. That first book sold 7,500 copies.

Her second novel David the King (1946) was a Literary Guild selection and #1 bestseller. This book sold more than one million copies and was translated into ten languages.

By 1961, she had produced six novels, including Rembrandt, which was published by Random House on June 26 of that year. Chosen as the Literary Guild's featured selection for July 1961, three publishing firms reportedly competed for the right to publish the work in England, according to Bennett Cerf, the head of Random House.

== Later years, death and interment ==
During their later years, Schmitt and her husband resided in Pittsburgh's Squirrel Hill neighborhood.

Schmitt died at the age of sixty-three at the Shadyside Hospital in Pittsburgh on October 3, 1972. The cause of death was a heart attack.

Her funeral was held at H. Samson, Inc. in Oakland on October 5, 1972; she was interred at St. Peter's Lutheran Cemetery in Belmar.

== Awards ==
Schmitt was recognized with the following awards:

- Witter Byner Prize, Scholastic Magazine, (third place, 1927; for her poem, Lucrezia Borgia)
- Distinguished Daughter of Pennsylvania (1961)
- Ryan Award for Teaching, Carnegie Mellon University (1972)

== Works ==
- The Gates of Aulis, Dial (New York, NY), 1942.
- David the King (Literary Guild choice), Dial (New York, NY), 1946, reprinted, 1973.
- Alexandra, Dial (New York, NY), 1947.
- Confessors of the Name (Literary Guild selection), Dial (New York, NY), 1952.
- The Persistent Image, Dial (New York, NY), 1955.
- A Small Fire, Dial (New York, NY), 1957.
- Rembrandt (Literary Guild selection), Random House, 1961.
- The Heroic Deeds of Beowulf, Retold (juvenile), Random House, 1962.
- Electra (novel), Harcourt, 1965.
- Boris, the Lopsided Bear (juvenile), Collier, 1966.
- The Godforgotten, Harcourt, 1972.
- Sonnets for an Analyst, Harcourt, 1973.
