= Bird's nest =

A bird nest is a place where birds lay and hatch eggs.

Bird's nest may also refer to:

== Places ==
- Nickname for the Beijing National Stadium
- The Bird's Nest (house), Newport, Rhode Island
- Bird's Nest (Shelby County, Kentucky)

== Cuisine ==
- Bird's nest soup, a delicacy made from the salivary excretions of the swiftlet
- Bird's nest pudding, traditions of desserts said to resemble a bird's nest
- Seafood birdsnest, southern Chinese dish made of taro
- Another name for egg in the basket

== Plants and fungi ==
- Bird's nest plant, carrot (Daucus carota)
- Bird's nest fern, several species of ferns in the genus Asplenium
- Bird's nest orchid, Neottia nidus-avis
- Bird's nest fungi, several fungi in the order Nidulariales

== Books ==
- The Bird's Nest (novel), by Shirley Jackson

== Other ==
- Birds Nest (horse), a British Thoroughbred racehorse
- Bird's nest (Song), a Hebrew children's poem by Hayim Nahman Bialik
