= Shirley (2020 film) =

2020 film by Josephine Decker

- Release poster
- Directed by: Josephine Decker
- Screenplay by: Sarah Gubbins
- Based on: Shirley by Susan Scarf Merrell
- Produced by: Jeffrey Soros; Simon Horsman; Christine Vachon; David Hinojosa; Elisabeth Moss; Sue Naegle; Sarah Gubbins
- Starring: Elisabeth Moss; Michael Stuhlbarg; Odessa Young; Logan Lerman; Victoria Pedretti; Orlagh Cassidy; Robert Wuhl
- Cinematography: Sturla Brandth Grøvlen
- Edited by: David Barker
- Music by: Tamar-kali
- Production companies: Los Angeles Media Fund; Killer Films
- Distributed by: Neon
- Release dates: January 25, 2020 (Sundance); June 5, 2020 (United States)
- Running time: 107 minutes
- Country: United States
- Language: English
- Box office: $309,641

Shirley is a 2020 American biographical drama film directed by Josephine Decker from a screenplay by Sarah Gubbins, based on the 2014 novel by Susan Scarf Merrell, which formed a "largely fictional story" around novelist Shirley Jackson during the time period she was writing her 1951 novel Hangsaman. The film stars Elisabeth Moss as Jackson, with Michael Stuhlbarg, Odessa Young, and Logan Lerman in supporting roles. Martin Scorsese serves as an executive producer.

Shirley had its world premiere at the Sundance Film Festival on January 25, 2020, where Decker won the Special Jury Award for Auteur Filmmaking. The film was released in the United States on June 5, 2020, by Neon to positive reviews, with praise for Moss's performance.

== Plot ==
Fred and Rose Nemser are newlyweds relocating to Bennington College for Fred's job as a lecturer. Fred is about to work for Stanley Hyman while Rose, still a student, is already enthralled by the work of Stanley's wife, Shirley Jackson, writer of "The Lottery", the dark short story which shocked readers of The New Yorker when it was published on June 26, 1948.

Minutes after their first meeting, Shirley asks Rose about her (not yet announced) pregnancy, saying "I'm a witch, didn't you know?" Soon after, Stanley asks Rose to help with menial jobs around the house because Shirley is struggling to write after suffering another bout of agoraphobia. Fred and Rose reluctantly assent and move into the house. Rose realizes that she has unwittingly agreed to serve as the family housekeeper. She also sees the pathology of Stanley and Shirley's marriage: in his worship of Shirley's genius as a writer, Stanley enables her drinking and her lethargy; in turn, Shirley tolerates Stanley's posturing and pomposity, and she winks at his serial love affairs.

The Nemsers move into the Jackson-Hyman house. Shirley is deliberately dismissive of and even cruel to Rose, who has apparently given up on her studies in order to manage the household. Shirley begins to write again, announcing a new work based on Paula Jean Welden, a young woman who recently disappeared from Bennington's campus. Stanley is obsessive and controlling about Shirley's writing process; he asserts that she is a genius, but he wheedles and cajoles her to stay on task. Despite her initial harsh treatment of Rose, Shirley begins to think of the younger woman as somewhat of a muse. Shirley opens up to Rose, having her do research for the new book, including stealing the medical files for Paula Jean Welden. As the two grow closer, Rose falls more and more under Shirley's spell. She is enraptured by and protective of Shirley. A sexual flirtation builds between them, but is never acknowledged or consummated by the two.

In the meantime, the relationship between Stanley and Fred deteriorates as Stanley seeks to tamp down Fred's ambitions and to torpedo his career as an academic.

Rose's baby is born, yet Shirley remains wrapt in the cocoon of her writing; the arrival of a baby has little effect on life in the Jackson/Hyman household. Now feeling that the Nemsers have served their purpose, Stanley arranges for them to move out. Desperate to stay, Rose writes the name of Paula Jean Welden in a Bennington College library book and gives it to Shirley, hoping she'll infer that Paula had been Stanley's student and had been having an affair with him. To Rose's shock, Shirley is unaffected, saying that she's well aware of Stanley's love affairs and that she knows Paula was not one of his lovers. She also reveals that Rose's husband Fred is just the same as Stanley — that he too has been having sex with his students.

After confronting Fred about his infidelity, Rose runs off. As she walks along the road, with her baby daughter in her arms, Shirley pulls up next to her in a car and offers to drive her wherever she would like. Rose wants to see the trail where Paula disappeared. When Shirley arrives, Rose hands her the baby and then follows the trail into the woods. Shirley finds her at the edge of a cliff, where Rose is clearly weighing whether or not to jump. After a tense moment, Rose gives in and turns away from the edge. Her safe return home isn't a capitulation, though. When she and Fred finally drive away from the Jackson-Hyman house, Rose vows never to return to being a docile wife devoted to a life of domesticity.

Alone at last, Shirley allows Stanley to read her work on Hangsaman. He declares it to be a work of genius. Shirley acknowledges his praise. It's obviously a familiar pattern in their peculiar partnership. The two celebrate by drinking and dancing — together and yet alone in their cluttered house.

== Cast ==
- Elisabeth Moss as Shirley Jackson
- Michael Stuhlbarg as Stanley Edgar Hyman
- Odessa Young as Rose Nemser/Paula
- Logan Lerman as Fred Nemser
- Victoria Pedretti as Katherine
- Orlagh Cassidy as Caroline
- Robert Wuhl as Randy Fisher
- Ryan Spahn as Drunk Cad

== Production ==
On May 16, 2018, it was announced that Josephine Decker was set to direct an adaptation of Susan Scarf Merrell's novel Shirley, based on a screenplay by Sarah Gubbins. Producers were set to include Jeffrey Soros, Simon Horsman, Christine Vachon, David Hinojosa, Elisabeth Moss, Sue Naegle, and Gubbins. Production companies involved with the film were slated to consist of Los Angeles Media Fund and Killer Films. Martin Scorsese serves as an executive producer.

Alongside the initial production announcement, it was confirmed that Elisabeth Moss and Michael Stuhlbarg had been cast as Shirley Jackson and Stanley Hyman, respectively. On September 6, 2018, it was announced that Odessa Young and Logan Lerman had joined the cast of the film.

Principal photography for the film began in late July 2018 in Jefferson Heights, New York. Scenes were also filmed at Vassar College, which stood in for Bennington College.

== Release ==
Shirley had its world premiere at the Sundance Film Festival on January 25, 2020. Decker won a U.S. Dramatic Special Jury Award for Auteur Filmmaking. Shortly afterward, Neon acquired distribution rights to the film. It was released in the United States on Hulu and video on demand and in select drive-in theaters on June 5, 2020.

== Reception ==
=== Critical response ===
On the review aggregator website Rotten Tomatoes, the film holds an approval rating of 87% based on 251 reviews, with an average rating of 7.4/10. The website's critics consensus reads, "Elevated by outstanding work from Elisabeth Moss, Shirley pays tribute to its subject's pioneering legacy with a biopic that ignores the commonly accepted boundaries of the form." On Metacritic, the film has a weighted average score of 76 out of 100, based on 43 critics, indicating "generally favorable" reviews.

Laurence Jackson Hyman, Jackson's son, criticized the movie's portrayal of his parents, noting that "If someone comes to the movie not knowing anything about my parents, they will certainly leave thinking that my mother was a crazy alcoholic and my father was a mean critic." He also expressed that, in his opinion, the movie failed to portray Jackson's sense of humor.

Harper's Bazaar considered the film "a gripping, psychologically unsettling drama", noting it to be "loosely based on real life... far from a traditional biopic, instead playing on the horror tropes of Jackson's own work to lure viewers inside the author's brilliant but troubled mind."

NBC News, stating that the film "captures the chills-down-your-spine feeling that Jackson's writing so skillfully masters" observed that "while many of the characters are real, most of Merrel's [sic] book is fictional, which might confuse the casual film-watcher" and noted that "the quandary of fictionalizing a real life is not new, and it remains an ethically weird endeavor"; "After watching "Shirley" there may be people who think Shirley Jackson was vicious, childless and incapable of keeping herself bathed and fed. And that is unfortunate."

=== Accolades ===
Award	Date of ceremony	Category	Recipient(s)	Result	Ref.
Sundance Film Festival	February 1, 2020	U.S. Dramatic Special Jury Award: Auteur Filmmaking	Josephine Decker	Won	
Sundance Film Festival	February 1, 2020	U.S. Dramatic Competition Grand Jury Prize	Josephine Decker	Nominated	
Hollywood Critics Association Midseason Awards	July 2, 2020	Best Picture	Shirley	Nominated	
Hollywood Critics Association Midseason Awards	July 2, 2020	Best Actress	Elisabeth Moss	Nominated	
Hollywood Critics Association Midseason Awards	July 2, 2020	Best Supporting Actress	Odessa Young	Nominated	
Hollywood Critics Association Midseason Awards	July 2, 2020	Best Supporting Actor	Michael Stuhlbarg	Nominated	
Hollywood Critics Association Midseason Awards	July 2, 2020	Best Female Director	Josephine Decker	Nominated	
Hollywood Critics Association Midseason Awards	July 2, 2020	Best Adapted Screenplay	Sarah Gubbins	Nominated	
Hollywood Critics Association Midseason Awards	July 2, 2020	Best Indie Film	Shirley	Won	
Florida Film Critics Circle	December 21, 2020	Best Actress	Elisabeth Moss	Nominated	
Florida Film Critics Circle	December 21, 2020	Best Art Direction/Production Design	Kirby Feagan	Nominated	
Florida Film Critics Circle	December 21, 2020	Breakout Award	Odessa Young	Nominated	
Hollywood Music in Media Awards	January 27, 2021	Best Original Score in an Independent Film	Tamar-kali	Nominated	
Saturn Awards	October 26, 2021	Best Film Presentation in Streaming Media	Shirley	Nominated	

== Factual and fictional elements ==
The Nemsers are fictional characters; the New Yorker observed that at the time depicted in the film (the writing of Hangsaman) Jackson and Hyman had four children, who do not appear in the film.
