= What a Thought =

Short stories by Shirley Jackson

"What a Thought" is a short story by Shirley Jackson. It was published posthumously within the short-story collection Just an Ordinary Day in 1996.

== Plot summary ==
The story concerns a bored housewife who, while reflecting on herself, her husband, and the relationship between them, fantasizes about the potential ways in which she could kill him and worries about her future beyond his death, intermixed and accompanied by these thoughts are various anxieties and rejections of them. Throughout the story she questions why she is continuing to imagine such thoughts, the story ultimately culminating with the wife striking her husband's head with an ashtray, while denying her desire to kill him immediately before, the last line being: ""I don't want to," she said as she struck him."
