= Disappearance of Paula Jean Welden =

1946 disappearance in Vermont, US

Paula Welden
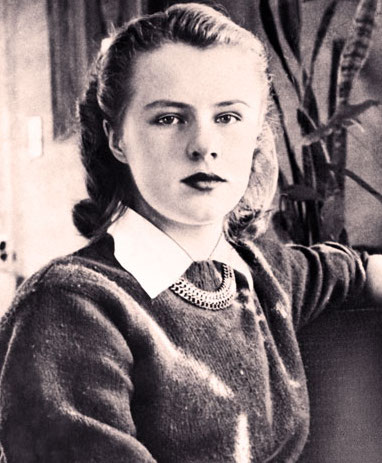
- Circulated photograph of Welden
- Born: Paula Jean Welden; October 19, 1928; Stamford, Connecticut, U.S.
- Disappeared: December 1, 1946 (aged 18); Bennington, Vermont, U.S.
- Status: Declared dead in absentia (1956)
- Education: Bennington College
- Height: 5 ft 5 in (1.65 m)

Paula Jean Welden (born October 19, 1928—disappeared December 1, 1946) was an American college student who disappeared while walking on the Long Trail hiking route in Vermont. Local sheriffs were criticized for errors made in the investigation, which led to the creation of the Vermont State Police (VSP). Welden's fate remains unsolved and was one of several unexplained disappearances in the same area, dubbed the "Bennington Triangle," during a five-year span.

== Background ==
Paula Jean Welden was the eldest of four daughters of industrial engineer, architect and designer William Archibald Welden (1900–1970) and his wife Jean Douglas (née Wilson; 1901–1976) of Stamford, Connecticut. Employed by the Revere Copper and Brass Company, Welden's father was the designer of many familiar household utensils, as well as stylish cocktail shakers and other objects. Welden herself was a 1945 graduate of Stamford High School.

In 1946, Welden was a sophomore at Bennington College in North Bennington, Vermont. Her college dormitory was Dewey House, one of the older dormitories on the college grounds, and which remains standing. In late November of that year, Welden resolved to find and walk a portion of the Long Trail, a hiking route located a few miles from the campus. She tried to get some other students to join her, but they were busy; she ventured onto the trail alone.

== Disappearance ==
On December 1, after finishing her shift in the Bennington College dining hall, Welden returned to her room and changed into walking clothes. Her clothing was adequate for the weather that afternoon but not for the anticipated drop in temperature that night. She packed no bag, took no extra clothing, and did not take any extra money. From all appearances, Welden did not expect to be gone more than a few hours.

Welden walked to the campus entrance and hitched a ride from State Route 67A to a point on State Route 9 near the Furnace Bridge, between downtown Bennington and Woodford Hollow. Local contractor Louis Knapp picked Welden up and drove her as far as his house on Route 9, about 2.5 miles (4.0 km) from the Long Trail. From this point, Welden either hitched or walked the rest of the way to the start of the trail in Woodford Hollow.

A group of hikers were walking down the Long Trail as Welden was walking up. She approached them and asked them a few questions about the trail. Welden continued walking in a northerly direction on the road portion of the trail now known as Harbour Road. She was on the trail late in the afternoon, and darkness was falling as she approached the end of Harbour Road. She may have continued into quickly darkening woods. It was presumed that she must have continued her walk along the Bolles Brook valley, although there are no known confirmed sightings of her past the Fay Fuller Camp.

== Search ==
Original missing person flyer for Welden, dated 1946

Welden did not return to campus. Her roommate thought she must have gone to the library to study for exams, but the next morning Welden still had not returned. Once the college administrators were notified, they immediately started a search of the campus itself. The Bennington County state's attorney was notified, and the county sheriff was brought in to help with the search. Over the next couple of days, Welden's visit to the Long Trail was discovered when one of the hikers she had approached identified her from the photo in the Bennington Banner newspaper, where he worked.

Weeks of searching ensued. Bennington College closed for several days, and students and faculty participated in organized searches. Hundreds of volunteers, family members, National Guard troops, and firefighters searched for Welden to no avail. Ground and air searches concentrated on the Long Trail up as far as Glastenbury Mountain (10 miles [16 km] to the north), the trail's various branches, and along Route 9 from Bennington to Brattleboro. Most of those searching assumed Welden had gotten lost in the woods. When no clues were found as to her whereabouts, other theories started to be considered.

== Connecticut State Police investigation ==
Alternative theories speculated that Welden had been in unusually high spirits and had decided to run away to start a new life, was going to meet a secret lover and eloped with him, or had become injured and suffered from amnesia. Darker theories speculated that Welden was depressed and may have died by suicide, or that she had been kidnapped or murdered.

At the time of Welden's disappearance, there was no state police organization in Vermont, and the state's attorney, county sheriff and state investigator Almo Franzoni were responsible for finding clues. Welden's father pressed the investigators and Governor Mortimer R. Proctor to bring in additional professional law enforcement help. Proctor asked Governor Raymond E. Baldwin of Connecticut to lend assistance. Connecticut State Police detective Robert Rundle and state policewoman Dorothy Scoville were assigned to the case. They interviewed every person who saw, or thought they saw, Welden, and every person who lived along the route she took or who were simply in the vicinity of the Long Trail on that December afternoon.

Investigators discovered that one of the last people to see Welden alive was a lumberjack named Fred Gaudette, (Note: The lumberjack's surname consistently appeared as "Gaudette" in 1952 newspaper reports; it appears as "Gadette" in various online content about Welden's disappearance.) who lived along Harbour Road. Gaudette was in the midst of an argument with his girlfriend when Welden walked by. He stormed off in a jealous rage shortly thereafter and, depending on different statements he made, went to his shack and spent the evening by himself or he drove up the travel portion of the trail (where Welden was heading). He lied to police on several occasions and was a person of interest, both in 1946 and when the case was revisited in 1952. Reportedly, Gaudette told at least two people that he knew within one hundred feet (30 m) where Welden was buried, but later claimed it was just idle talk. When no evidence was found that a crime had been committed, no body was discovered, and no forensic clues were identified, this avenue of the investigation ended.

== Aftermath ==
The manner in which Welden's disappearance was handled by local law enforcement was sharply criticized by her father and many others. Welden's father pointed out that the lack of a statewide law enforcement organization and the lack of training of local sheriffs contributed to a poorly run investigation. Within seven months of Welden's disappearance, the Vermont legislature created the Vermont State Police.

=== Other cases ===
Disappearance locations of Welden (Bennington in 1946), Hull (Lebanon Springs in 1936), and Smith (Lakeville in 1952)

In the same general area where Welden disappeared, at least four other unexplained vanishings were reported to have taken place between 1945 and 1950. Due to the strangeness of these events, Vermont broadcaster and author Joseph A. Citro dubbed the wilderness area northeast of Bennington "the Bennington Triangle"—a reference to unexplained disappearances in the Bermuda Triangle.

Other females disappeared under similar circumstances within the New England region during the same era, (Note: The disappearances of Hull, Welden, and Smith span 16 years and 3 months (April 1936 to July 1952).) and there has been speculation that all three might have been victims of an unidentified serial killer. In addition to Welden:

- Katherine Hull, aged 22, vanished from Lebanon Springs, New York, on April 2, 1936. She went for a walk and did not return. She may have been hitchhiking, per some contemporary reports. Remains found by a hunting party more than seven years later, in December 1943, near the New York state border in Hancock, Massachusetts, close to where Hull disappeared, were tentatively identified as hers.
- Constance Christine "Connie" Smith, a 10-year-old girl, ran away from Camp Sloane in Lakeville, Connecticut, on July 16, 1952, and was last seen hitchhiking along U.S. Route 44. Her disappearance has never been solved.

Lebanon Springs, New York, is located 40 miles (64 km) south of Bennington, Vermont, and 46 miles (74 km) north of Lakeville, Connecticut. Since Connie Smith appeared to be older than she actually was, one author speculated that she might have been a victim of a serial killer with a preference for young women in their late teens, such as Welden, or early twenties, such as Hull.

=== In literature ===
- Author Shirley Jackson (1916–1965) was possibly inspired by Welden's vanishing when she wrote her novel Hangsaman (1951), as indicated by Jackson's papers in the Library of Congress. At the time of Welden's disappearance in 1946, Jackson was living in North Bennington, where her husband was employed at Bennington College. Jackson's short story "The Missing Girl", included in Just An Ordinary Day (the 1996 collection of her previously unpublished/uncollected short stories), also references the Welden case.
- In turn, Shirley Jackson's interest in Welden's disappearance is a throughline in Susan Scarf Merrell's 2014 novel Shirley, on which a 2020 film was based. The novel's narrator is obsessed by Jackson's artistic relationship to the case.
- Author Hillary Waugh's 1952 novel Last Seen Wearing... is generally acknowledged to have been inspired by, if not directly based on, Welden's disappearance.
- Author Donna Tartt has stated that Welden’s disappearance was one of her inspirations for starting her novel The Secret History.

== See also ==
- List of people who disappeared mysteriously (1910–1970)
