= The Possibility of Evil =

1965 short story by Shirley Jackson

"The Possibility of Evil" is a 1965 short story by Shirley Jackson. Published on December 18, 1965, in the Saturday Evening Post, a few months after her death, it won the 1966 Edgar Allan Poe Award for best mystery short story. It has since been reprinted in the collections Just an Ordinary Day (1996) and Dark Tales (2016).

While not as well-known or read as her 1948 classic, "The Lottery", it later became a set work in high school English classes and appeared as "Elements of English 10".

== Plot ==
Miss Adela Strangeworth is a 71-year-old spinster living in an unnamed small town. She is described prominently as a harmless old lady at the beginning of the story. Through her conversations with various other townspeople, it is evident that Miss Strangeworth feels a sense of ownership towards the town, never having left it for longer than a day, and has great interest in its residents. She also takes great pride in the orderliness of her house, as well as her family roses, which were planted by her grandmother and tended by her mother before her. However, Miss Strangeworth is not such a quiet figure in her town; she often writes anonymous poison pen letters to her neighbors, which are rarely based on fact and more on what gossip she has heard during her walks down the streets. When she is mailing some of them, one is dropped on the ground and one of her neighbors (whom she had once made a subject of her uncouth letters) notices, and, feeling kind, delivers it to the intended recipient (unaware the letter is meant to be anonymous). The next morning, Miss Strangeworth receives a similarly written letter, informing her that her roses, a source of her familial pride, have been destroyed.

== Style ==
Like "The Lottery," it deals with the "casual cruelty in the everyday" that Jackson explores in almost all of her short stories.

== Themes ==
This short story explores themes such as a person's duality (two-facedness) among their peers, the dents that people make upon a community and how they restore them, and the revenge of the wronged.

There is also a frequently commented-upon debate on the symbolism of the roses. The most common metaphor is that the roses represent the impression Strangeworth has made on her community seen throughout the story; they represent her respect among the townspeople. Upon the discovery of her cruel "anonymous" letter, though, as her reputation is tarnished, so are her roses. Others argue that the roses represent Strangeworth's cruelty hidden behind her polished exterior: while sweetly fragrant and beautiful on the outside, a closer look reveals thorns.

== Critical reception ==
Joyce Carol Oates described the story as 'terrifying' and it is generally regarded as one of Jackson's finest works.

It was commented in an unrelated Daily Telegraph article that this was the point in which Shirley Jackson had reached maturity as an author, a process that began and continued long after the early & famous publication of Jackson's controversial short story, "The Lottery." This is a common opinion that has also been voiced by many other admirers of Jackson such as Paul Theroux and Neil Gaiman.

It has even been commented by some critics to be Shirley Jackson's masterpiece, and superior to "The Lottery," We Have Always Lived in the Castle, and The Haunting of Hill House.
