= Just an Ordinary Day =

1996 posthumous collection of short stories by Shirley Jackson

- Cover of the 1st US edition
- Author: Shirley Jackson
- Cover artist: Tom Hallman
- Language: English
- Genre: Short stories
- Publisher: Bantam Books
- Publication date: 1996
- Publication place: United States
- Media type: Print (hardcover)
- Pages: 388
- ISBN: 9780553103038

Just An Ordinary Day is a posthumous collection of short stories by American writer Shirley Jackson, first published in 1996 by Bantam Books.

== Background ==
According to Jackson's children, Laurence Jackson Hyman and Sarah Hyman DeWitt, an old box bearing no return address (apparently discovered in a Vermont barn), mysteriously appeared on Hyman's front porch at some point during the early 1990s. Inside were the original manuscript for The Haunting of Hill House, six unpublished stories, and many pages of notes. This discovery led Hyman and Dewitt to produce a new collection of their mother's work titled Just An Ordinary Day, which contains thirty-two new stories—some of which came from Jackson's unsorted papers that had been sent by her husband to the Library of Congress as well as from the San Francisco Public Library—and twenty-one which had appeared in periodicals, but had never been collected in book form.

== Contents and brief summary of stories ==
The introduction to the collection is written by Hyman and DeWitt; there is also a preface by Jackson entitled "All I Can Remember."

Part One: Unpublished Stories

- "The Smoking Room": The devil appears to a college student while she is writing a paper and asks her to sign a contract selling her soul, but is tricked into selling his soul to her instead.
- "I Don't Kiss Strangers"
- "Summer Afternoon"
- "Indians Live in Tents"
- "The Very Hot Sun in Bermuda"
- "Nightmare"
- "Dinner For A Gentleman": A young woman is aided in preparing dinner for her future husband by her fairy godmother.
- "Party of Boys"
- "Jack the Ripper"
- "The Honeymoon of Mrs. Smith" (Versions I & II)
- "The Sister"
- "Arch-Criminal"
- "Mrs. Anderson"
- "Come To The Fair"
- "Portrait"
- "Gnarly The King of the Jungle"
- "The Good Wife"
- "Devil of a Tale"
- "The Mouse"
- "My Grandmother and the World Of Cats"
- "Maybe It Was The Car"
- "Lovers Meeting"
- "My Recollections of S.B. Fairchild": Kafkaesque story of a family that tries to return a defective tape recorder to the department store where it was purchased.
- "Deck the Halls"
- "Lord of the Castle": Medieval-era tale about a young nobleman who enlists the powers of darkness to avenge the death of his father.
- "What a Thought"
- "When Barry Was Seven"
- "Before Autumn"
- "The Story We Used To Tell": As a woman consoles her friend on the death of her husband, the two are drawn to a mysterious painting of the old house in which they are staying.
- "My Uncle In The Garden"

Part Two: Uncollected Stories (with periodical of first publication)

- "On The House" (The New Yorker, October 30, 1943, p. 77): A liquor store clerk gets into an argument with a blind man who believes he has been short-changed.
- "Little Old Lady in Great Need" (Mademoiselle, September 1944, as "Little Old Lady")
- "When Things Get Dark" (The New Yorker, December 30, 1944, p. 40)
- "Whistler's Grandmother" (The New Yorker, May 5, 1945, p. 59)
- "Family Magician" (Woman's Home Companion, September 1949): A mysterious housekeeper magically solves a family's various problems.
- "The Wishing Dime" (Good Housekeeping, September 1949)
- "About Two Nice People" (Ladies Home Journal, July 1951)
- "Mrs. Melville Makes a Purchase" (Charm, October 1951)
- "Journey With A Lady" (Harper's, July 1952)
- "The Most Wonderful Thing" (Good Housekeeping, June 1952)
- "The Friends" (Charm, November 1953)
- "Alone in a Den of Cubs" (Woman's Day, December 1953)
- "The Order of Charlotte's Going" (Charm, July 1954)
- "One Ordinary Day, With Peanuts" (The Magazine of Fantasy & Science Fiction, January 1955): Mr. Johnson wanders around the city doing various good deeds: babysitting a small child, playing matchmaker between a boy and girl, and helping a man find a place to live. At the end of the day, he goes home to his wife, from whom he learns that she has spent her day sending dogs to the pound, insulting a waitress, and getting a bus conductor fired. They then casually agree to switch their roles for the next day.
- "The Missing Girl" (The Magazine of Fantasy and Science Fiction, December 1957)
- "The Omen" (Fantasy & Science FIction, March 1958)
- "The Very Strange House Next Door"
- "A Great Voice Stilled" (Playboy, March 1960)
- "All She Said Was Yes" (Vogue, November 1, 1962)
- "Home" (Ladies Home Journal, August 1965)
- "I.O.U." (Gentleman's Quarterly, December 1965)
- "The Possibility of Evil" (Saturday Evening Post, December 18, 1965)

== Reception ==
Publishers Weekly describes Just An Ordinary Day as a "feast" "[f]or Jackson devotees, as well as first-time readers . . . a virtuoso collection," while Kirkus Reviews writes: "There's rather a lot of inchoate work here . . . and many of the bland titles were obviously only preliminary. Of the unpublished stories, best are such Saki-like models of compact menace . . . as well as two of Jackson's most amusing pictures of embattled motherhood. The uncollected pieces, many of them first published in popular magazines, are nevertheless generally much stronger . . . Even at a bit below the level of her best work, it's nice to have Jackson back again."
