= The Bird's Nest (novel) =

1954 novel by Shirley Jackson

- First edition
- Author: Shirley Jackson
- Language: English
- Genre: Realistic fiction; Thriller; Gothic
- Published: 1954
- Publisher: Farrar, Straus and Young
- Publication date: 1954
- Publication place: United States
- Media type: hardcover book
- Pages: 276
- ISBN: 978-0143107033
- Preceded by: Hangsaman; 1951
- Followed by: The Sundial; 1958

The Bird's Nest is a 1954 novel by Shirley Jackson. The plot concerns a young woman, Elizabeth Richmond, with multiple personality disorder.

== Writing and background ==
While writing The Bird's Nest, Jackson suffered from insomnia, backaches, and paranoia, symptoms similar to those the main character of the novel is afflicted with. She took a break from writing the novel in the summer of 1953, but the symptoms returned when she continued writing the book that fall.

== Plot ==
Almost every chapter of the novel follows a specific character. Chapter one follows Elizabeth, a shy young woman who lives with her Aunt Morgen and works as a secretary at a museum. She frequently suffers headaches, backaches, and insomnia. Elizabeth begins receiving threatening, handwritten letters addressing her as "dirty dirty lizzie." One morning, Morgen accuses Elizabeth of sneaking out of the house at night; Elizabeth has no memory of doing so. Aunt Morgen takes her to a doctor when Elizabeth makes vulgar comments at a dinner party without being aware of doing so. The doctor is unable to help Elizabeth but refers her to Dr. Wright, a psychiatrist.

The next chapter follows Dr. Victor Wright. He interviews Elizabeth and gains her trust, convincing her to submit to hypnosis so he can better understand her problem. In this hypnosis, he succeeds in temporarily calming Elizabeth's head and backaches. During his second attempt, he encounters two of Elizabeth's alter personalities: Beth, a calm and friendly girl, and Betsy, who is immature, childlike, and frightens him. He procures details as to Elizabeth's mother's whereabouts (who died several years before), which he believes to be the root of the problem. Betsy threatens to take over Elizabeth and does so one night. Dr. Wright believes that he's subdued her and agrees to let her be in control for a day. He then tries to summon Beth to tell her to fight Betsy's impulses but instead speaks to Betsy, who is pretending to be Beth. He later gets a call from Morgen informing him that Elizabeth has run away from home.

The third chapter focuses on Betsy, who takes a bus to New York City, where she believes she will find her mother. While on the bus, Betsy recalls an event in which she went to the beach with her mother and Robin, her mother's then-boyfriend. While at the beach, she overhears Robin telling her mother that he hates Elizabeth and wishes she'd stayed at home with Morgen; unable to remember how her mother responded, Betsy tells herself that her mother defended her. Once she has returned to reality and exited the bus, she gets a hotel room and goes to a restaurant, befriending a man whom she eats with. It is revealed that he is a doctor, and Betsy, convinced that he is Dr. Wright in disguise, flees the restaurant. She then boards a city bus and informs another passenger that she is searching for her mother. The woman, going by a description Betsy gives of the home, suggests that she look on the West Side. Betsy obeys but continually runs into people whom she believes to be enemies from her past. Beth and Elizabeth occasionally take control of her, climaxing when Elizabeth overpowers Betsy and renders her unconscious. Elizabeth wakes up in a hospital with her fourth personality, Bess, in charge for the first time in the novel.

The fourth chapter is narrated from the perspective of Dr. Wright again. He calls Elizabeth to his office once she is discharged from the hospital and attempts to get information about why she went to the city. Bess, the alter now at the helm of Elizabeth's personality, is uncooperative and discusses little except her money and her hatred for her aunt, who she believes wants to steal it. Betsy sometimes takes control of Elizabeth and often plays practical jokes on Bess, but Bess grows more powerful. Eventually, Betsy resorts to controlling Bess' hand and writing messages on a piece of paper. Bess, who is frightened because she insists she's not doing the writing herself, refuses to believe that it is either she or Betsy who is writing. Instead, she blames Dr. Wright and insists that it must be a magic trick. Dr. Wright writes a note to Elizabeth's aunt, asking her to phone him, but receives a reply berating him for a vulgar note. Dr. Wright figures out that Betsy rewrote the note to scare off her aunt. When questioned about her motive, Betsy confesses that she is unsure why she doesn't want Dr. Wright to contact her aunt. Eventually, the doctor schedules an appointment with Aunt Morgen to discuss the condition of her niece. The meeting starts well, but Aunt Morgen becomes intoxicated and begins shouting at the doctor. Bess then returns home and announces that she wants Dr. Wright and Aunt Morgen out of her life. Dr. Wright storms off in a rage and vows to never work with Elizabeth again.

The fifth chapter follows Aunt Morgen. She wakes up hungover the next morning and talks with Betsy. After a short conversation in which Betsy tries to get Morgen to say she likes her best, Morgen heads upstairs to take a nap. When she goes downstairs later, she finds her refrigerator full of mud. Horrified, returns to bed, waking late in the afternoon. That night, she yells at Elizabeth, then, feeling guilty, offers to let her use some of her new bath salts in a warm bath. Elizabeth obliges, but when she gets out, she has changed to Beth, who wants to take her bath, then Bess, then finally Betsy, who uses the last of the bath salts. The next morning, fed up with Bess's insolence, Morgen calls Dr. Wright and convinces him to come to the house and straighten out Elizabeth. When he arrives, Bess attempts to fight Morgen and keep her away from the door, but Morgen defeats her and lets Dr. Wright in. She explains to Betsy and the doctor the complete circumstances regarding Elizabeth's mother's death. According to Aunt Morgen, Elizabeth's mother was an alcoholic who was not emotionally available, and following an incident where she disappointed her daughter, Elizabeth shook her mother violently. Elizabeth's mother died shortly afterwards. Heartbroken, Elizabeth declares, "I am going to close my eyes now and you will never see me again" as each of her fractured personalities vacates her body.

The sixth and final chapter follows a now nameless Elizabeth Richmond. Having absorbed, or "eaten," all of her previous identities, Elizabeth is slowly recovering from her illness and establishing her independence. At the novel's conclusion, she is offered two new names by Dr. Wright and her aunt, Victoria and Morgen, and their two combinations Victoria Morgen and Morgen Victoria. She laughs and announces, "I'm happy...I know who I am."

== Critical reception ==
The novel initially garnered lukewarm reviews from critics, some of whom felt that Elizabeth's personalities were too simple. Kirkus Book Reviews was more positive, however, commenting that, while the story could be quite unusual, that for "a special audience, an exploratory of precarious and unpredictable variations, this has a certain fascination."

More recently, however, the book has become the subject of more positive reviews. Flavorwire praised the novel, commenting that it "displays Shirley Jackson’s groundbreaking narrative abilities," and calling the novel "a masterwork of psychological fiction, and one that deserves as much attention as Jackson’s more popular writings", while The New York Times praised the book as a "dryly unsettling [...] novel".

== Release ==
In 2014, Penguin Publishing reprinted the novel, along with Jackson's 1958 work The Sundial.

== Film adaptation ==
A film adaptation of the book, titled Lizzie, was filmed in 1957 and released the following year. It was directed by Hugo Haas and starred Eleanor Parker as the titular character. The film was a modest success, grossing more than $500,000 at the box office with a $361,000 budget, but Jackson reportedly disliked the movie, particularly its portrayal of Aunt Morgen as a flirtatious floozy rather than the caring and steady woman depicted in the book. She described the film as "Abbott and Costello meet a multiple personality." However, upon seeing the film she changed her mind and "thought it was extremely good, and enormously improved over the first script I saw."
