= Louisa, Please Come Home =

Short story by Shirley Jackson

"Louisa, Please Come Home" is a short story by Shirley Jackson first published in 1960 in May's edition of Ladies Home Journal entitled "Louisa, Please". It has since been reprinted in the collections Come Along with Me (1968), Troubled Daughters, Twisted Wives (edited by Sarah Weinman, 2013) and Dark Tales (2016).

The story often appears as set work in high school English classes.

== Background ==
Biographers believe this short story — along with "The Missing Girl" — is inspired by the seven people who disappeared in the woods around Bennington, Vermont between 1945 and 1950, near where Shirley Jackson lived from 1945 until her death.

== Plot ==
Set in the 1950s, 19-year-old Louisa Tether leaves her Rockville family home the day before her sister Carol's wedding. She had been planning to leave for a while, and had put a lot of thought into her disappearance. She travels on a bus and a train before arriving at Chandler, one of the biggest cities in the state, where she blends in as an average girl, taking up the false identity of "Lois Taylor". Louisa finds a nice room in a rooming house, befriending its owner, Mrs. Peacock, and while intending to sign up for a secretary course, she winds up getting a good job at a stationery store instead. On the anniversary of her disappearance, she hears her mother's voice on the radio, asking her to return home. Three years after leaving home, Louisa encounters Paul, a neighbor from Rockville, in Chandler. Paul persuades her to come back home so that he may claim the reward being offered for finding her, but when they return to Rockville, her family does not believe her; Paul had already tried to claim that two girls were their daughter before. Looking around in her former home, Louisa begins to realize that she wants to stay, but with Paul unable to convince her family, she leaves to return to Chandler, giving Paul the money her parents had given her as travel fare. The story ends with Louisa mentioning that her mother still calls out for her on the radio every year on the anniversary of her running away.

== Themes ==
The story contains two themes: showing that people do not appreciate what they have until they have lost it and also that people may know you but do not see the real you.
