= Paranoia (short story) =

2013 short story by Shirley Jackson

Illustration from The New Yorker

"Paranoia" is a short story by Shirley Jackson first published on August 5, 2013 in The New Yorker long after the author's death in 1965. Jackson's children found the story in her papers in the Library of Congress. It has since been reprinted in Dark Tales (2016).

== Background ==
According to Jackson's son, Laurence Jackson Hyman, in an interview with The New Yorker:

the story was most likely written in the early 1940s, during World War II. So there would have been a constant sense of danger and distrust in the air, both in relation to foreign countries and in relation to the U.S. government's attempts to uncover espionage at home.

== Plot ==
In Manhattan, businessman Mr. Halloran Beresford leaves his office happy and jolly after a busy day at work pleased with remembering his wife's birthday. He buys chocolates on the way home and plans to take his wife out to a romantic dinner and a show. But on his commute home, he repeatedly comes across a man in a light hat who he believes is stalking him. Trying to escape the man, he is repeatedly accosted by other strangers who seem to be part of the plot. Finally he arrives home, where his wife comforts him, only to lock him in the room and make a phone call, saying "Listen, he came here after all. I've got him."
