= Come Along with Me (collection) =

Collection of works by Shirley Jackson

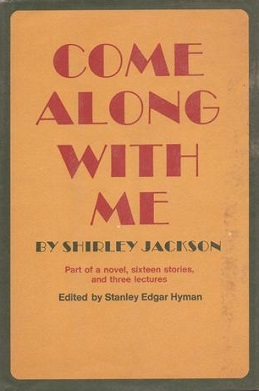
- First edition
- Author: Shirley Jackson
- Language: English
- Genre: Gothic fiction
- Published: 1968 (Viking Press)
- Publication place: United States

Come Along with Me is a posthumous collection of works by American writer Shirley Jackson. It contains the incomplete titular novel, on which Jackson was working at the time of her death, three lectures delivered by Jackson, and sixteen short stories, mostly in the gothic genre, including Jackson's best known work, "The Lottery".

The collection was published by Jackson's husband, Stanley Edgar Hyman, in 1968, three years after Jackson's death, and includes a preface by him. It was listed by The New York Times Book Review among the best fiction of 1968. In 2013, Come Along with Me was reprinted by Penguin Classics.

As of 2015, Come Along with Me was featured in the collections of more than 1,000 libraries.

== Summary ==
The incomplete titular novel, Come Along with Me, centres on the inner life of a cheerful middle-aged widow who calls herself Angela Motorman. After the death of her husband, Hughie, Angela sells her house and personal belongings in order to move to a strange city, where she sets up a business as a medium in her new boarding house. It is written in a more light-hearted style than many of Jackson's other works.

=== Contents ===
- Come Along with Me
- "Janice"
- "Tootie in Peonage"
- "A Cauliflower in Her Hair"
- "I Know Who I Love"
- "The Beautiful Stranger"
- "The Summer People"
- "Island"
- "A Visit"
- "The Rock"
- "A Day in the Jungle"
- "Pajama Party"
- "Louisa, Please Come Home"
- "The Little House"
- "The Bus"
- Experience and Fiction
- "The Night We All had Grippe"
- Biography of a Story
- "The Lottery"
- Notes for a Young Writer

== Adaptations ==
Joanne Woodward directed an adaptation of the novel Come Along with Me as an episode of the PBS anthology series American Playhouse in 1982, with a cast led by Estelle Parsons and Sylvia Sidney. The episode originally aired on February 16, 1982.
