= Martha Samuelson =

American businesswoman

- Citizenship: American
- Education: Yale University (BA); Harvard Law School (JD); MIT Sloan School of Management (MBA)
- Occupations: Chairman, Analysis Group

Martha S. Samuelson is Chairman of Analysis Group, Inc. Samuelson is an expert in antitrust, finance, and valuation, combining her training in finance and economics with five years of experience as a practicing trial attorney. A critical aspect of her work is the direction of economic analyses for large-scale litigations. Since joining Analysis Group in 1992, Samuelson has played a key role in the company's growth and diversification and has brought significant new clients, academic affiliates, and professional staff to the firm.

== Early life and education ==
Samuelson was born to the daughter of journalist Maggie Scarf and economist Herbert Scarf. Her sister, Susan Scarf Merrell, is a noted author. Samuelson received her a B.A. from Yale University, her J.D. from Harvard Law School, and her M.B.A. from the MIT Sloan School of Management. In 1981, she married Paul R. Samuelson, the son of economist Paul Samuelson.

== Recognition ==
Samuelson was elected to Global Competition Review's Women in Antitrust (2016), the International Who's Who of Competition Lawyers and Economists (2012), and Euromoney's Guide to the World's Leading Competition and Antitrust Lawyers/Economists (2012).

Samuelson wrote about the importance of thoughtful decision making and meaningful work in a 2015 article published in Harvard Business Review. She also participated in a 2011 executive roundtable discussion on finding and retaining talented people, published as part of the Boston Globe "Top Places to Work" feature, and discussed how the organization fosters leadership, accountability, and mentoring relationships in a 2010 interview with the New York Times.
