= The Lovely House =

Short story

"The Lovely House" is a gothic short story and weird tale by American writer Shirley Jackson, first published in 1950. The story features several overtly gothic elements, including a possibly haunted house, doubling, and the blurring of real and imaginary. It appeared under the title "A Visit" in New World Writing, No. 2, 1952.

The story was later reprinted in Jackson's posthumous collection Come Along With Me in 1968 (published by Viking Press and reprinted by Penguin Classics in 2013) under the title "A Visit." It was also reprinted in the anthology American Gothic Tales, edited by Joyce Carol Oates, in 1996.

American literary critic S.T. Joshi claims that "The Lovely House" exemplifies the "'quiet weird tale' at its pinnacle" in its embodiment of "the manner in which a house can subsume its occupants."

== Plot summary ==
"The Lovely House" consists of three main parts. In part one, the main character Margaret starts her summer vacation with her friend Carla Montague. The Montagues' home is a huge and beautifully decorated house that is set among lavish grounds. The house has many themed rooms; for example, there is a fan room, a painted room, and a room with a tile mosaic on the floor. Every room contains one or more tapestries with a picture of the house on it. In the room with the tiles, there is a mosaic of a girl, with the words "Here is Margaret, who died for love."

In part two, Carla's long-anticipated brother arrives with a friend. Paul, the Captain, Carla, and Margaret pass time in various parts of the grounds. Margaret and Paul often separate from the other two, which seems to disturb Carla. One afternoon when Margaret and Paul are looking at the river, they discuss the tower and Paul tells Margaret that there is an old lady, an Aunt or a Great Aunt or a Great-Great Aunt, that hides away in the tower because she hates the tapestries. Eventually Margaret ascends the tower and meets the old lady, whose name is also Margaret. The encounter goes strangely and Margaret leaves in a hurry.

In part three, the Montagues say farewell to their son by hosting a ball. The old lady shows up at the ball to see and reminisce with Paul. Margaret overhears part of a strange conversation between the two that implies they were young together even though now they appear to be quite different ages. After the ball, the Captain points out the many ways in which the house needs repair. The family immediately become defensive and the meal ends. After breakfast, Margaret and Paul are in the drawing room. Paul becomes defensive about the state of the house, then abruptly takes his leave of Margaret. The family then says goodbye to the Captain. It is at this point in the story that the story makes clear that the Captain is Carla's brother. The story leaves ambiguous what the relationship is between Paul, Margaret, and the elderly Margaret.

== Main themes ==
=== Familial relations ===
When Carla's brother comes home, the family seems to the reader to be complete once again.

=== Gothic architecture ===
The tower is old and ruined; this symbolizes Margaret's death and her never-dying love for Paul.
