= Lizzie (1957 film) =

1957 film by Hugo Haas

- Film ad
- Directed by: Hugo Haas
- Screenplay by: Mel Dinelli
- Based on: The Bird's Nest; 1954 novel by Shirley Jackson
- Produced by: Jerry Bresler
- Starring: Eleanor Parker; Richard Boone; Joan Blondell
- Cinematography: Paul Ivano
- Edited by: Leon Barsha
- Music by: Leith Stevens
- Color process: Black and white
- Production company: Bryna Productions
- Distributed by: Metro-Goldwyn-Mayer
- Release date: March 15, 1957
- Running time: 81 minutes
- Country: United States
- Language: English
- Budget: $361,000
- Box office: $555,000

Lizzie is a 1957 American film noir drama film directed by Hugo Haas. The film is based on the 1954 novel The Bird's Nest by Shirley Jackson and stars Eleanor Parker, Richard Boone and Joan Blondell. The popular songs "It's Not for Me to Say" and "Warm and Tender" were written for this film, and performed by Johnny Mathis, who played a piano player/singer in the film. The film was produced by MGM Studios.

== Plot ==
Elizabeth (Eleanor Parker) has recurring headaches and is plagued with insomnia. She is receiving letters from a woman called Lizzie, but Elizabeth can't remember knowing anyone named Lizzie. When Elizabeth is under hypnosis, her psychiatrist, Dr. Wright (Richard Boone), discovers Elizabeth has three personalities: The shy Elizabeth, the Mr. Hyde-like Lizzie, and the kind, well-adjusted Beth, the woman she always should have been. It is up to Dr. Wright to help Elizabeth to become Beth completely. In the end, the events of young Elizabeth's birthday are revealed: Her mother—an abusive alcoholic—came late to the child's birthday with her drunken boyfriend in tow. Elizabeth lost her temper with her, and she collapsed and died. Elizabeth blames herself for her mother's death. Elizabeth's Aunt Morgan, who has shown little sympathy for her niece's suffering, knew about this. Then Elizabeth retrieves another memory of that day: Her mother's boyfriend raped her. (This is shown through a prolonged sequence in which he slowly pursues her up the stairs and into her bedroom, concluding with a closeup of the girl's face.) She never told anyone. Aunt Morgan is angry, shocked, and genuinely sorry.

In the present, alone in her bedroom, a three-way mirror is the stage on which Beth fights and wins the battle for dominance. Dr. Wright promises that he will continue to help her learn to live.

== Cast ==
- Eleanor Parker as Elizabeth Richmondt
- Richard Boone as Dr. Neal Wright
- Joan Blondell as Aunt Morgan
- Hugo Haas as Walter Brenner
- Ric Roman as Johnny Valenzo
- Dorothy Arnold as Elizabeth's mother
- Marion Ross as Ruth Seaton
- Johnny Mathis as Piano Singer

== Production ==
The film was produced by Bryna Productions, which was Kirk Douglas' company.

Johnny Mathis made his film debut in Lizzie. "It's Not for Me to Say" became one of his big hits during his career. Both this song and "Warm and Tender", which appear in the film, were subsequently included in Mathis' fifth album, Johnny's Greatest Hits.

TCM.com reports that Lizzie's producers sued Fox to postpone the release of the film The Three Faces of Eve, starring Joanne Woodward, because of the similarity of their plots. Fox did delay until early in 1957 after the publication of the biography on which The Three Faces of Eve was based.

== Reception ==
According to MGM records, the film earned $280,000 in the U.S. and Canada and $275,000 in other markets, resulting in a loss of $154,000.

Shirley Jackson, the author of the novel on which Lizzie was based, was reportedly unimpressed with the screenplay, writing "I have read the screen play and it sounds a little like Ma and Pa Kettle, or Abbott and Costello meet a multiple personality." but when she saw the movie, she "thought it was extremely good, and enormously improved over the first script I saw."

== See also ==
- List of American films of 1957
