= Susan Scarf Merrell =

American author

- Education: Cornell University College of Arts and Sciences; Bennington College (MFA)
- Occupation: Author
- Spouse: James Merrell
- Parent(s): Herbert Scarf; Maggie Scarf
- Relatives: Martha Samuelson (sister)
- Website: www.susanscarfmerrell.com

Susan Scarf Merrell is an American author who has published novels, short stories, and essays. Her second novel, Shirley, about a young woman who goes to live with novelist Shirley Jackson and Stanley Edgar Hyman in their Bennington, Vermont home in 1964, was published June 12, 2014 by Blue Rider/Penguin Books.

Her short stories and essays have been published in Los Angeles Review of Books, Tin House, The Writer's Chronicle, The Southampton Review, and The New Haven Review. Her debut novel, A Member of the Family, was published in 2001 after her publication of The Accidental Bond: How Sibling Connections Influence Adult Relationships in 1997.

A graduate of Cornell University's College of Arts & Sciences, Merrell received her MFA from the Bennington Writing Seminars at Bennington College and teaches in the MFA program at Stony Brook Southampton. She is also director of the Southampton Writers Conference.

Merrell is married to James Merrell. She is the daughter of journalist Maggie Scarf and economist Herbert Scarf. She has two sisters, Martha Samuelson and Betsy S. Stone.

In 2020, a movie rendition of her novel, Shirley, was released, directed by Josephine Decker and starring Elisabeth Moss as the novelist Shirley Jackson.

== Publications ==
- The Accidental Bond: How Sibling Connections Influence Adult Relationships (1997) ISBN 978-0449911198
- A Member of the Family: A Novel (2001) ISBN 978-0060930097
- Shirley: A Novel (2014) ISBN 978-0147516190
