= The Road Through the Wall =

Book by Shirley Jackson

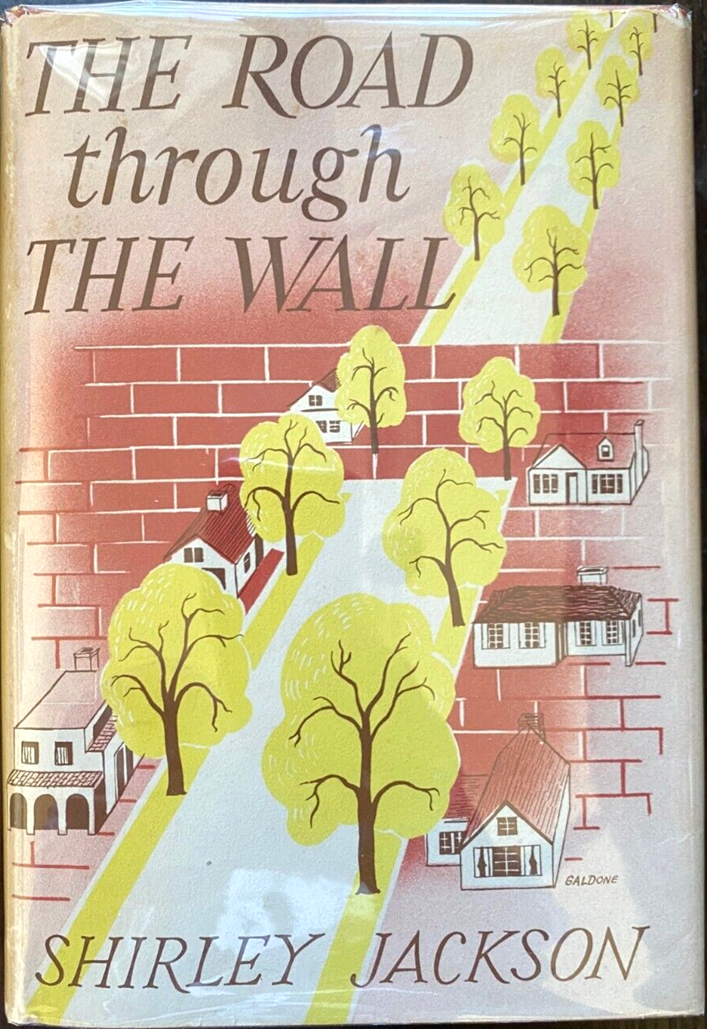
- First edition
- Author: Shirley Jackson
- Cover artist: Paul Galdone
- Language: English
- Genre: Gothic; Realism; Thriller
- Set in: 1936
- Publisher: Farrar, Straus
- Publication date: 1948
- Publication place: United States
- Media type: hardcover novel; paperback
- Pages: 220
- ISBN: 978-0445031289 second edition, 1976
- Followed by: Hangsaman

The Road Through the Wall is a 1948 novel by author Shirley Jackson. It draws upon Jackson's own experiences growing up in Burlingame, California.

== Background ==
The Road Through the Wall was Jackson's first novel. She began writing it while her husband, literature critic Stanley Edgar Hyman, was writing a book of literary analysis, titled The Armed Vision. Jackson loosely based the novel on her childhood, growing up in an affluent California neighborhood. She also admitted that she wrote the book, in part, to get back at her parents, whom she resented for their narrow-mindedness and greed, stating that a writer's first novel has to be the one in which they get back at their parents.

== Plot summary ==
Pepper Street, an upper-middle-class neighborhood in Cabrillo, California, is separated from lower-class neighboring streets by the wall of a sprawling, wealthy estate. The residents of Pepper Street consider themselves upstanding citizens, when in fact their numerous prejudices have filtered down to their children. Pepper Street is abuzz with news that the wall is soon to be torn down to make way for a new housing subdivision. All Pepper Street is concerned with what unsavory elements this will allow into their neighborhood.

The only rental home on Pepper Street is taken by a family consisting of a rarely seen single mother and her two daughters, who instantly become objects of suspicion. The older daughter Beverley appears to be developmentally disabled, while the younger girl, Frederica, cares for both her ill mother and her sister. Virginia Donald, the most popular girl on Pepper Street, learns that Beverley often possesses large amounts of money. Virginia and her friend Mary begin to take advantage of Beverley, convincing her to buy them gifts while secretly mocking her.

Marilyn Perlman and Harriet Merriam, two imaginative young girls, become friends due to their isolation: Marilyn is rejected because she is the only Jewish child in the neighborhood, Harriet because she is overweight. The girls form a close bond and begin to imagine a shared future in which they are always friends. However, Harriet's mother, who secretly fears losing control of her daughter, orders Harriet to break off the friendship on the grounds of Marilyn's religion. Harriet complies and is left completely alone.

Caroline Desmond, a delightful three-year-old, is beloved by the entire neighborhood. One evening at a neighborhood party, Caroline goes missing. The neighbors organize to find her, only to discover she has been bludgeoned to death. Tod Donald, an outcast teen, commits suicide immediately after the event. Though it is uncertain who killed Caroline, the residents presume Tod's guilt in order to restore normalcy.

The story ends with the wall's destruction, leaving insular Pepper Street exposed to the rest of the world.

== Critical reception ==
Reviewing Jackson's first novel in the Montreal Gazette, Wilbur Atchison wrote: "Miss Jackson is no Sinclair Lewis; she is only 28. But she does in her most recent work show a remarkable talent for putting on paper the everyday happenings which at times make life a pleasure and sometimes make it pretty grim."
