= Hangsaman =

1951 gothic novel by Shirley Jackson

- Cover of first edition
- Author: Shirley Jackson
- Language: English
- Genre: Bildungsroman | Gothic fiction
- Publisher: Farrar, Straus and Young
- Publication date: 1951
- Publication place: United States
- Pages: 191
- ISBN: 978-0143107040 current edition, published by Penguin
- Preceded by: The Road Through the Wall
- Followed by: The Lottery and Other Stories

Hangsaman is a 1951 gothic novel by American author Shirley Jackson. The second of Jackson's published novels, Hangsaman is a bildungsroman about 17-year-old Natalie Waite's struggles with her family, alienation, and distinguishing reality from imagination in her freshman year at a liberal arts college. The novel takes its title from "The Maid Freed from the Gallows", an old folk ballad. Jackson's text mixes satire with psychological elements as her protagonist spends half her time in an imaginary world.

The official publisher's description of Hangsaman says the novel is "loosely based on the real-life disappearance of a Bennington College sophomore in 1946," referencing the case of Paula Jean Welden. At the time, Jackson was living in Bennington, Vermont, as her husband, Stanley Edgar Hyman, was employed at Bennington College, where Welden had been a student. However, Ruth Franklin's research for her 2016 biography of Jackson found no evidence the novel was inspired by Welden's disappearance.

== Plot ==
=== Chapter one ===
Natalie Waite is a 17-year-old, college bound girl who prefers her imagination to life with her overbearing, harshly critical father, a writer, and her depressed, emotionally unstable housewife mother. One Sunday, Natalie imagines herself being interrogated by a detective for the murder of her father as she goes about her day. Her father forces her to submit her writing to ruthlessly critique her. Later, her mother breaks down crying as they cook together, warning Natalie not to marry a man like him. Natalie struggles to stay grounded against her detective fantasy during her parent's dinner party, as she drinks alcohol for the first time and mingles with guests. An older man takes advantage of her state to sexually assault her on a log in the woods behind her home. The next day, Natalie convinces herself that the assault did not happen.

=== Chapter two ===
Natalie seeks a fresh start at the college her father chose for her, a "progressive" all-female school run by all-male professors, but struggles to fit-in after refusing a hazing ritual. She meets Elizabeth Langdon, the 21-year-old wife and former student of the English professor, Arthur Langdon. Elizabeth confesses she hates her life and begs for Natalie's friendship, until Arthur arrives with two students, Anne and Vicki, who coyly flirt with him, and passive aggressively insult Elizabeth. Spending time with all four, Natalie develops a crush on Arthur. While her dorm struggles with thefts, an intruder, the death of a girl from a failed abortion, and a violent sleepwalker, Natalie writes letters to her father portraying a happier college life. She saves Elizabeth from a home fire, implied to be a suicide attempt. Another day, Anne and Vicki invite the Langdons over and get Elizabeth drunk, then push Natalie to take her home so they can spend the night alone with Arthur. One night, Natalie is woken up by a naked girl and led to a room showing all the stolen belongings reported missing. She flees and encounters a girl called Tony, infamous for her eccentricity.

=== Chapter three ===
Shortly afterwards, Natalie visits home for Thanksgiving, but realizing things are no longer the same, goes back to college early. She starts to hate her peers, and imagines destroying them as a giant. Natalie becomes close to Tony, damaging her reputation along the way. The two go out in town, play games where they try to spot tarot symbols in public, and sing poems from Through the Looking-Glass. One evening, Tony takes them on a bus to the forest beyond an abandoned amusement park. Natalie loses Tony in the dark and sits on a log to wait for her. When she reappears, Natalie begs to go home and Tony refuses, appealing to their intimacy for her to stay. Natalie runs out of the woods and is found by a couple in a car, who drop her back to a bridge near the college. Natalie climbs the bridge railing, hesitates, then steps down to safety. Finally, she turns back towards the college feeling "grown-up, and powerful, and not at all afraid."

== Themes ==
=== Coming of age ===
Speller argues that Hangsaman reflects a broader theme in Jackson’s work, that of the female coming of age and its associated vulnerability to sexual assault. This is explored primarily through Natalie’s assault, but also through Arthur Langdon’s inappropriate relationships with his students, mirroring Jackson's husband's affairs with students at the all-girl's college he taught at.

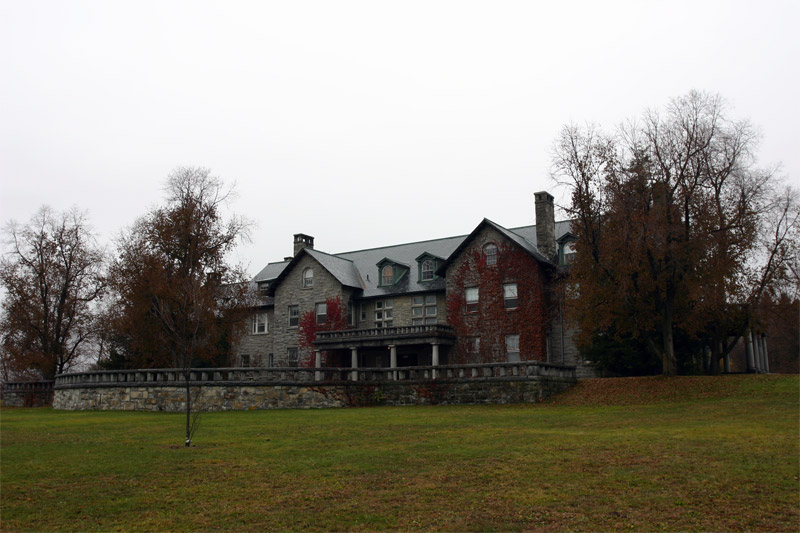
Bennington College, the formerly all-female school in Vermont, where Jackson's husband Stanley Edgar Hyman taught.

The ballad that the novel takes its title from describes an unmarried girl begging the ‘hangsaman’ to wait before hanging her so either her lover or father may rescue her, who either save her or arrive just to see her hanged, depending on the version. Behrens takes note of this, pointing out that Natalie’s assault occurred as a result of her father’s party, encouragement for her to drink, and he consistently erodes Natalie’s sense of self by forcing her to submit her private journals for critique, claiming they are depending on each other for their identities, and even characterizing their relationship as ‘a captive princess’ and her knight. In this sense, the vulnerability associated with coming-of-age for a young woman begins at home; Rubenstein explores how Mrs. Waite’s warnings go unheeded by Natalie, used to her father positing her mother as an outsider to them both, culminating in her crush on her professor, who parallels Mr. Waite.

=== Trauma and mental illness ===
Some critics see Jackson’s ambiguous, subjective style, where the reader struggles to distinguish reality from Natalie’s interpretation of it, as a reflection of Natalie’s fractured mental state resulting from the trauma, identifying it as a dissociative disorder, a personality disorder, schizophrenia, or post-traumatic stress disorder. Behrens makes a case that Tony is a fragment of Natalie’s own personality, much like the detective at the start of the story, evidenced by the vague descriptions of Tony in the text as difficult to distinguish from Natalie; her rejection of Tony allows her to overcome her mental illness and realize herself.

Meg Toth reads the novel as the process of survivorship, where Natalie’s initial rejection of the trauma by denying it occurred is transformed by the end of the book, where she is able to re-narrativize it through the interaction with Tony, in a scene paralleling the setting where she is assaulted, able to come away feeling “powerful” and fearless. Natalie’s coming of age, therefore, is associated with her ability to regain a sense of control after being damaged by her assault.

=== Language ===
With the narration centered around Natalie's subjective thought process, much of the book is fixated on language's role in forming identity. Tehlan writes on how language is the means by which Natalie safeguards her reality and identity, and her father's criticism of her written work is another form of eroding her identity:

"Natalie makes her father voice her so that it becomes unheard until it is lost here in the internal speech of Elizabeth Submarine, which Jackson has recreated stylistically using second, third, or vague pronouns and varying narrative point of view. The reader is frequently unable to tell whether the thought is that of Natalie or of the paternal voice that is in her. Such a linguistic confusion plays out the act of psychic colonization: the identity of Natalie is erased by the language of patriarchal authority."

Behren argues that Natalie emphasizes names for concepts over their identity, which mirrors her own ambiguous sense of self.

== Reception ==
Hangsaman released to a lukewarm reception in 1951, with critics calling the book "opaque" and "obscure," and the first printing not selling out. Prescott of The New York Times wrote: “‘Hangsaman’” is a beautifully written and thoroughly exasperating novel."

It remained relatively unappreciated compared to Jackson's other novels during her lifetime, but has since found its own acclaim. The 2020 film Shirley is a fictionalized account of the time in which Jackson was writing Hangsaman, depicting the novel's creation as being inspired both by the Welden disappearance and the life of a newly married couple boarding in the home of Jackson and her husband. Francine Prose wrote in the foreword to the Penguin Classics edition:

"Hangsaman is indeed a very strange novel, but what it shared with the others on my list... is not only oddity but beauty, originality, a certain visionary intensity and the ability to make us feel as if we have been invited into a private, very intimate world with striking similarities to our world, whatever that might be."
