= The Sundial =

1958 novel by Shirley Jackson

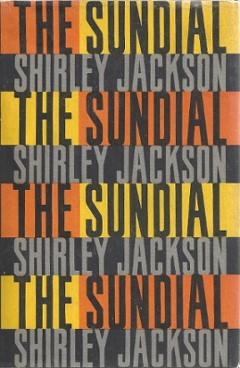
- First edition
- Author: Shirley Jackson
- Language: English
- Genre: Gothic fiction
- Publisher: Farrar, Straus, & Cudahy
- Publication date: 1958
- Publication place: United States
- Media type: Print

The Sundial is a 1958 novel by American writer Shirley Jackson.

== Plot summary ==
The Sundial tells the story of the residents of the Halloran house, opening on the evening of the funeral of Lionel Halloran, the house's master. Lionel's wife, Maryjane, is convinced that Lionel was pushed down the stairs and murdered by his mother, Orianna Halloran, who stands to inherit the house; only hours after the funeral, Maryjane teaches her young daughter, Fancy, to repeat the phrase "Granny killed my daddy." Also living at Halloran house are the aged Richard Halloran, who uses a wheelchair to move around, and is kept by a nurse; Essex, a young man hired to catalogue the library (it is implied that his real reason for employment is to be a kept man to the elder Mrs. Halloran); Fanny, Richard Halloran's sister; and Miss Ogilvie, young Fancy's governess.

The Halloran house was built by a man who became wealthy later in life. Its grounds include a large garden with a hedge maze, a summer house, and an artificial lake and grotto. The sundial stands in the center of the grounds and bears the inscription "WHAT IS THIS WORLD?" (a quotation from Chaucer's Canterbury Tales, in "The Knight's Tale").

Immediately upon the death of her son, Orianna seizes ownership of the house and begins to exert her power over its occupants: Miss Ogilvie and Essex are to be dismissed, Maryjane sent away, and Fanny allowed to live in the house only by Orianna's good graces. Young Fancy, who Orianna claims will inherit the house upon her grandmother's death, will remain. Amid the uproar following this announcement, Fanny receives a vision while walking in the Halloran gardens: the ghost of her father warns her that the world is soon to end and that only those in the Halloran house will be spared. As Fanny tells the others of the coming destruction, a snake seems to manifest on the floor; this is taken as an omen from the ghost of Fanny's father. Orianna, shaken, reconsiders and allows everyone to remain in the house.

Soon after this, Orianna sends for Mrs. Willow, an old friend of hers. Mrs. Willow arrives with her two daughters, Julia and Arabella; all three women seem intent on winning their way into the Halloran’s money, but become frightened when they hear of the coming destruction and refuse to be sent away. Only a few days after, another young woman named Gloria arrives. Gloria is seventeen, a daughter of a cousin of Orianna, who asks to stay with the Hallorans while her father is out of the country. Mrs. Willow, meanwhile, suggests they try to view the future through an oil-coated mirror, a parlor game from her adolescent years. Gloria volunteers to try it, and describes visions of the end of the world and the Eden-like paradise that will come afterwards. The visions terrify Gloria and the others must pressure her to see for them. Finally, a last member of the party is brought into the house: a stranger whom Fanny and Miss Ogilvie meet at random in the village. Upon making his acquaintance, Aunt Fanny dubs him "Captain Scarabombardon." His real first name is later revealed to be Harry.

At first the small group is excited, using the opportunity to spend Halloran money to stock up on items for the "next world." They burn books in the library to make room for supplies. At first the items are useful, but gradually, as the pampered residents begin to think of luxuries they might miss in "Eden", the supplies grow fanciful to the point of ridiculousness. Orianna soon begins to issue edicts and laws regarding behaviour after the world ends, setting herself up as the queen of the coming paradise. The more she commands and postures, the more the others ignore her as they grow more and more caught up by Gloria's increasingly detailed visions of the beauty of the next world. When doubt is again expressed by Orianna, another omen—the spontaneous shattering of a window overlooking the sundial—is attributed to Fanny's dead father.

There are at least two dissenters in the group. Julia, who finds the concept of the end of the world ridiculous, wishes to leave with Captain Scarabombardon. Orianna offers the captain a very large sum of money to take with them, because she will not have any need for it; this causes him to realize that she really believes the outside world will be destroyed, and he decides to stay. Julia goes on alone, but after a ride with a terrifying, sadistic cabbie, she flees back to the safety of the house. Gloria, meanwhile, has befriended Essex, and talks about her dream to live out the rest of her life—no matter how short it might be—in a real world, rather than the artificial, insulated world of the Halloran manor. Essex betrays Gloria by alerting Orianna of the young woman's plans of leaving.

A less obvious dissenter is Fancy. A spoiled and frightening child, Fancy resents the idea that the world will be destroyed before she has a chance to live in it, and plays obsessively with her dollhouse (which itself is a small model of the Halloran house), taking as much delight in ordering her dolls about as Orianna takes in lording over the residents of Halloran House. Fancy has taken her grandmother's promise of inheritance to heart, and claims that she will smash the dollhouse when her grandmother dies because she "won't need it anymore."

The evening before the world is due to end, Orianna plans a great party (outdoors, so that no one will comment on the preparations inside the house) and invites the whole village to attend for a final feast. This party takes on the air of a coronation when Orianna appears wearing a small gold crown to symbolise her position in the next world. Orianna vows never to remove the crown until she passes it on to Fancy. The day after the party is spent sending away the servants and covering up the windows of the house so that no one will have to see the destruction that will happen that night.

A violent storm begins, and the lights go out as the residents prepare to gather for the night in a single room. As the group goes downstairs, they discover Orianna dead on the landing. "I was certainly wondering about all those instructions and rules of hers," observes one character. "I kept thinking maybe she was going to a different place than ours." As they speculate on what might have happened, Fancy dashes down to take the crown from her grandmother's head and put it on her own. The two men brave the storm to carry Orianna's body to the sundial, where it is implied she will be swept away in the destruction. Then all the players gather together to wait for the coming morning, and the novel ends.

== Themes and criticism ==
Like many of Jackson's writings, The Sundial ends with a number of unanswered questions and unsettling speculations: it is uncertain if the world will end after the storm has passed, but if it does, are these unpleasant people to inherit the earth? Jackson offers no certainties.

Upon reading a contemporary review of The Sundial that claimed that the house represented the Catholic Church and that the squabbling characters represented dissenting Protestant factions, Jackson, herself an agnostic, remarked that she knew very little about the Catholic Church but was pleased that she had somehow gotten so much of it in.

Jackson herself was fond of joking of an "architectural gene" that cropped up in her family once every few generations, and the house presented in The Sundial might foreshadow the infamous Hill House in The Haunting of Hill House. There are many striking similarities between the two houses: both Hill House and Halloran House were built by husbands as gifts for wives who died shortly before or shortly after seeing the house for the first time, and both houses become the source of conflict between various family members who disputed the house's ownership. The "mathematically perfect" grounds and the jarring sundial might remind readers again of Hill House, where all the floors and walls are said to be slightly off-centre. Halloran House, while never openly "haunted" in the sense that Hill House claimed to be, is the site of at least two ghostly visitations.

The Sundial, like the earlier Jackson novel The Road Through the Wall, contains a great number of characters, none of whom are very sympathetic. An abundance of unpleasant characters — in addition to the eleven main characters, there are several other minor characters who appear throughout the novel as comic relief—populate the narrative.

John G. Park, in his article "Waiting For the End: Shirley Jackson's "The Sundial"," points to several instances of "confining narcissism" on the part of the novel's primary characters. Stephen King, in his Danse Macabre, summarized this concept as "a growing obsession with one's own problems; a turning inward instead of a growing outward." Throughout the novel, most of the characters' conversations are really competing monologues, with no one listening; moreover, both Orianna and Aunt Fanny attempt to manipulate the other adults in the same way that Fancy controls her dolls.

See also Richard Pascal, "New world miniatures: Shirley Jackson's The Sundial and Postwar American Society." Journal of American & Comparative Cultures Volume 23 Page 99 - Fall 2000.
