= Maggie Scarf =

American writer, journalist, and lecturer (born 1932)

- Born: Margaret Klein; May 13, 1932 (age 94)
- Occupations: Writer; journalist; lecturer
- Spouse: Herbert Scarf (died 2015)
- Children: 3, including Susan and Martha

Margaret Scarf (née Klein; May 13, 1932) is an American writer, journalist, and lecturer.

== Life and career ==
Her award-winning books and articles specialize in women, family relationships, and marriage in particular, including the best-selling books Unfinished Business: Pressure Points in the Lives of Women (Doubleday, 1980) and Intimate Partners: Patterns in Love and Marriage (Random House, 1987). She is a former Visiting Fellow at the Whitney Humanities Center, Yale University, and at Jonathan Edwards College, Yale University, as well as a Senior Fellow at the Bush Center in Child Development and Social Policy at Yale. She was a Contributing Editor to The New Republic, and a member of the advisory board of the American Psychiatric Press.

Maggie Scarf resided in Sag Harbor, New York with her husband Herbert Scarf (1930–2015), economist and Sterling Professor of Economics at Yale University. They have three daughters: Susan Scarf Merrell, Martha Samuelson, and Betsy S. Stone. She has eight grandchildren.

== Public and media appearances ==
Scarf has lectured widely and made several television appearances (The Oprah Winfrey Show, five times; The Phil Donahue Show; The David Letterman Show; CBS News; Good Morning America; The Today Show; and radio shows including the Larry King Show.) She has been interviewed extensively on radio and for magazines and newspapers.

As of 2014, she blogs for Psychology Today.

== Bibliography ==
- Body, Mind, Behavior, New Republic Press, 1976, ISBN 0440307651
- Unfinished Business: Pressure Points in the Lives of Women, Doubleday and Co., Inc., 1980, ISBN 0345471733
- Intimate Partners: Patterns in Love and Marriage, Random House, 1987, ISBN 039455485X
- Intimate Worlds: How Families Thrive and Why They Fail, Ballantine Books, 1997, ISBN 0345406672
- Meet Ben Franklin, Random House Books for Young Readers, 2002, ISBN 0375815244
- Secrets, Lies, Betrayals: How the Body Holds the Secrets of a Life, and How to Unlock Them, Ballantine Books, 2005; Reprint edition. ISBN 0345481178
- September Songs: The Good News About Marriage in the Later Years, Riverhead, 2009, ISBN 978-1594483998
- The Remarriage Blueprint: How Remarried Couples and Their Families Succeed or Fail, Scribner, 2013, ISBN 978-1439169544

== Representative Articles ==
- Brain researcher Jose Delgado asks: What Kind of Humans Would We Like to Construct? New York Times, Nov 15, 1970
- The Man Who Gave Us 'Inferiority Complex,' 'Compensation,' `Overcompensation.' New York Times, Feb 28, 1971.
- Oh, For a Decent Night's Sleep! New York Times, Oct 21, 1973.
- From Joy to Depression. New York Times, Apr 24, 1977.
- The More Sorrowful Sex. Psychology Today, April 1979.
- The Mind of the Unabomber. The New Republic, Jun 10, 1996.

== Honors, Fellowships, and Prizes ==
- Ford Foundation Fellow, 1973–74
- Nieman Fellow in Journalism (Harvard) 1975-76
- Fellow, Center for Advanced Study in the Behavioral Sciences, 1977–78
- Alicia Patterson Foundation Fellow, 1978–79
- Fellow, Center for Advanced Study in the Behavioral Sciences, 1985–86
- Grantee, The Smith Richardson Foundation, Inc., 1991, 1992, 1993, 1994
- National Media Award, American Psychological Foundation, 1971
- First Prize, National Media Award, American Psychological Foundation, 1974
- National Media Award, American Psychological Foundation, 1977
- Connecticut United Nations Award: Outstanding Connecticut Women, 1987
- Connecticut Psychological Association: Certificate of Appreciation, "in recognition of her contribution to the public understanding of psychological knowledge," 1988
- Certificate of Commendation, Robert T. Morse Writer's Competition, American Psychiatric Association, 1997
- Honoree of the New York State Society for Clinical Social Work, 1998

== Professional memberships ==
- PEN Writer's Association
- Connecticut Society of Psychoanalytic Psychologists
- The Elizabethan Club of Yale University
