= Shirley Jackson =

American novelist, short-story writer (1916–1965)

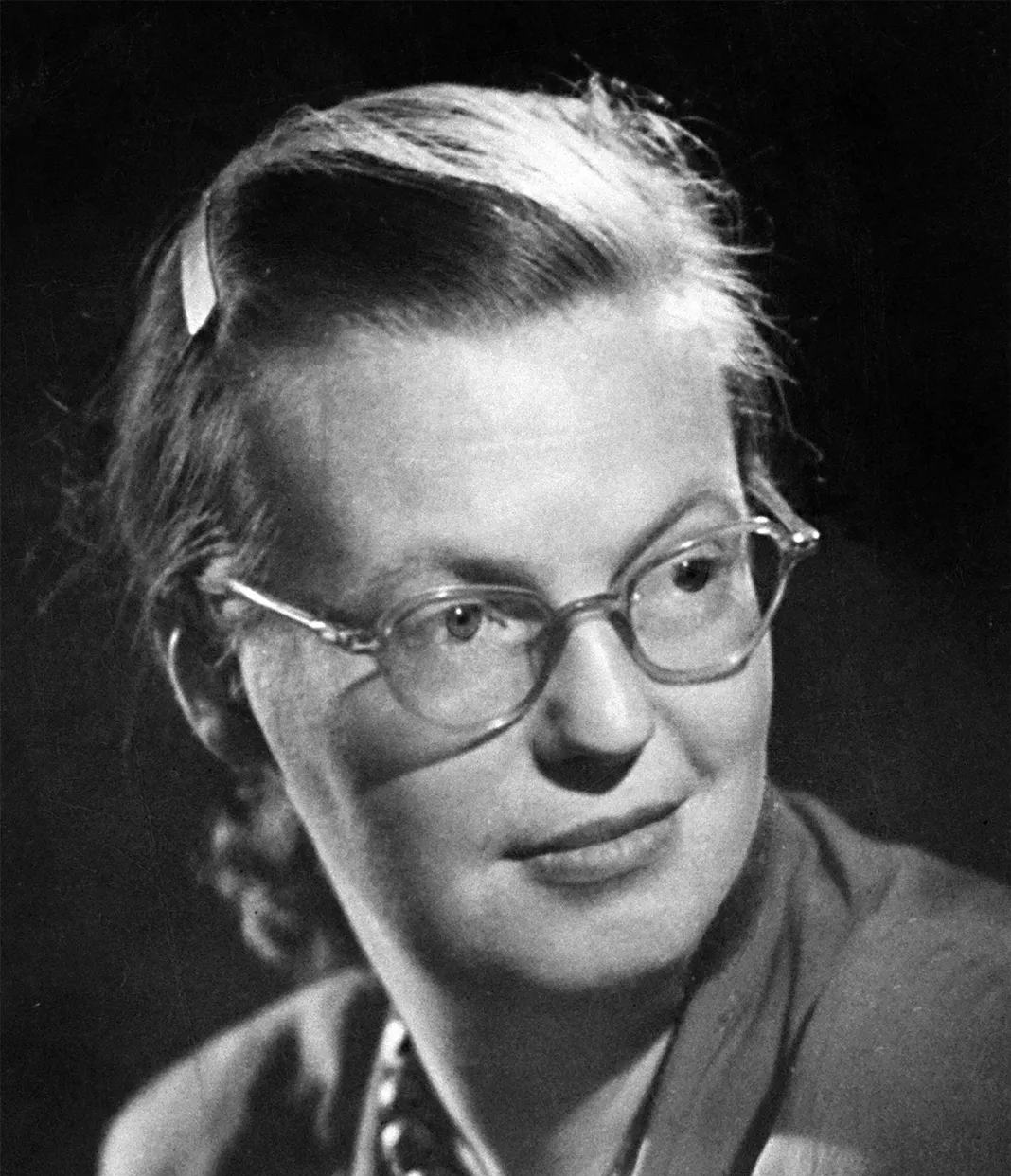
- Jackson c. 1940s
- Born: Shirley Hardie Jackson; December 14, 1916; San Francisco, California, U.S.
- Died: August 8, 1965 (aged 48); North Bennington, Vermont, U.S.
- Education: Syracuse University (BA)
- Occupation: Writer
- Spouse: Stanley Edgar Hyman (m. 1940)
- Children: 4
- Writing career
- Years active: 1943–1965
- Genres: Horror; mystery; gothic
- Notable works: "The Lottery"; Life Among the Savages; The Haunting of Hill House; We Have Always Lived in the Castle

Shirley Hardie Jackson (December 14, 1916 – August 8, 1965) was an American writer known primarily for her works of horror and mystery. Her writing career spanned over two decades, during which she composed six novels, two memoirs, and more than 200 short stories.

Born in San Francisco, California, Jackson attended Syracuse University in New York, where she became involved with the university's literary magazine and met her future husband Stanley Edgar Hyman. After they graduated, the couple moved to New York City and began contributing to The New Yorker, with Jackson as a fiction writer and Hyman as a contributor to "Talk of the Town". The couple settled in North Bennington, Vermont, in 1945, after the birth of their first child, when Hyman joined the faculty of Bennington College.

After publishing her debut novel, The Road Through the Wall (1948), a semi-autobiographical account of her childhood in California, Jackson gained significant public attention for her short story "The Lottery", which presents the sinister underside of a bucolic American village. She continued to publish numerous short stories in literary journals and magazines throughout the 1950s, some of which were assembled and reissued in her 1953 memoir Life Among the Savages. In 1959, she published The Haunting of Hill House, a supernatural horror novel widely considered to be one of the best ghost stories ever written. (Note: The Haunting of Hill House has been ranked as the 8th "Scariest Novel of All Time" by horrornovelreviews.com, and in Paste magazine's unsorted "30 Best Horror Books of All Time", Tyler R. Kane said, "If you go by the consensus of the literary community, Haunting of Hill House isn't only a book that revolutionized the modern ghost story—it's also the best.") Jackson's final work, the 1962 novel We Have Always Lived in the Castle, is a Gothic psychological horror novel that has been described as her masterpiece.

By the 1960s, Jackson's health began to deteriorate significantly, ultimately leading to her death due to a heart condition in 1965 at the age of 48.

== Ancestry ==
Jackson was of English ancestry, and her mother Geraldine traced her family heritage to the Revolutionary War hero General Nathanael Greene. Jackson's maternal great-grandfather, John Stephenson, had been a prominent lawyer in San Francisco—later a Superior Court Judge in Alaska—while her great-great grandfather was Samuel Charles Bugbee, an architect whose works included the homes of Leland Stanford and Charles Crocker and the Mendocino Presbyterian Church. Jackson said:

My grandfather was an architect, and his father, and his father. One of them built houses only for millionaires in California and that's where the family wealth came from, and one of them was certain that houses could be made to stand on the sand dunes of San Francisco, and that's where the family wealth went.

Jackson's maternal grandmother, nicknamed "Mimi", was a Christian Science practitioner who continued to practice spiritual healing on members of the family after her retirement. Jackson was known to critically assess such attempts, recounting a time when Mimi claimed to have broken her leg and healed it through prayer overnight, though she had really only lightly sprained her ankle. When Mimi died, Jackson told her daughter that she "died of Christian Science." While she believed that religion could easily become a vehicle for harm, the religious influences from her childhood are clear in Jackson's writing, which includes themes of mysticism, mental power, and witchcraft.

== Early life ==
Jackson was born December 14, 1916, in San Francisco, California, to Leslie Jackson and his wife Geraldine (née Bugby). (Note: Jackson would later claim to have been born in 1919 to appear younger than her husband, though she was in fact born in 1916. Most biographical material published in Jackson's lifetime reports the 1919 date.)

Jackson was raised in Burlingame, California, an affluent suburb of San Francisco, where her family resided in a two-story home located at 1609 Forest View Road. Her relationship with her mother was strained, as her parents had married young and Geraldine had been disappointed when she immediately became pregnant with Shirley, as she had been looking forward to "spending time with her dashing husband". Jackson was often unable to fit in with other children and spent much of her time writing, much to her mother's distress. Geraldine made no attempt to hide her favoritism towards her son, Barry, who explained his mother's antagonism towards Shirley by saying, "[Geraldine] was just a deeply conventional woman who was horrified by the idea that her daughter was not going to be deeply conventional." When Shirley was a teenager, her weight fluctuated, resulting in a lack of confidence that she would struggle with throughout her life.

She attended Burlingame High School, where she played violin in the school orchestra. During her senior year of high school, the Jackson family relocated to Rochester, New York, after which she attended Brighton High School, receiving her diploma in 1934. She then attended the nearby University of Rochester, where her parents felt they could maintain supervision over her studies. Jackson was unhappy in her classes there, and took a year-long hiatus from her studies before transferring to Syracuse University, where she flourished both creatively and socially. Here she received her bachelor's degree in journalism. While a student at Syracuse, Jackson became involved with the campus literary magazine, through which she met her future husband, Stanley Edgar Hyman, who later became a noted literary critic. While attending Syracuse, the university's literary magazine published Jackson's first story, "Janice", about a teenager's suicide attempt.

== Marriage ==
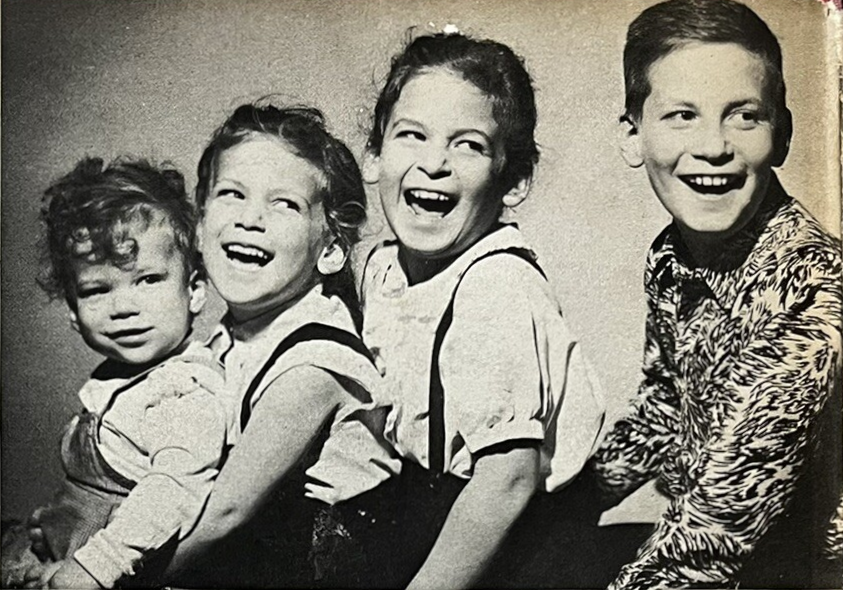
From left to right: Barry, Sally, Jannie, and Laurie c. 1953

After graduating, Jackson and Hyman married in 1940, and had brief sojourns in New York City and Westport, Connecticut, ultimately settling in North Bennington, Vermont, where Hyman had been hired as an instructor at Bennington College. Jackson began writing material as Hyman established himself as a critic. Jackson and Hyman were known for being colorful, generous hosts who surrounded themselves with literary talents, including Ralph Ellison. They were both enthusiastic readers whose personal library was estimated at 25,000 books. They had four children, Laurence (Laurie), Joanne (Jannie), Sarah (Sally), and Barry, who later achieved their own brand of literary fame as fictionalized versions of themselves in their mother's short stories. In an era when women were not encouraged to work outside the home, Jackson became the chief breadwinner while also raising the couple's children. "She did work hard," her son Laurence said. "She was always writing, or thinking about writing, and she did all the shopping and cooking, too. The meals were always on time. But she also loved to laugh and tell jokes. She was very buoyant that way." For examples of her wit, he refers readers to her many humorous cartoons, one of which depicts a husband cautioning a wife not to carry heavy things during pregnancy, but not offering to help.

According to Jackson's biographers, her marriage was plagued by Hyman's infidelities, notably with his students, and she reluctantly agreed to his proposition of maintaining an open relationship. Hyman also controlled their finances (meting out portions of her earnings to her as he saw fit), despite the fact that after the success of "The Lottery" and later work she earned far more than he did.

== Writing career ==
=== "The Lottery" and early publications ===
In 1948, Jackson published her debut novel, The Road Through the Wall, which tells a semi-autobiographical account of her childhood growing up in Burlingame, California, in the 1920s. Jackson's most famous story, "The Lottery", first published in The New Yorker on June 26, 1948, established her reputation as a master of the horror tale. The story prompted over 300 letters from readers, many of them outraged at its conjuring of a dark aspect of human nature, characterized by, as Jackson put it, "bewilderment, speculation, and old-fashioned abuse". In the July 22, 1948, issue of the San Francisco Chronicle, Jackson offered the following in response to persistent queries from her readers about her intentions: "Explaining just what I had hoped the story to say is very difficult. I suppose I hoped, by setting a particularly brutal ancient rite in the present and in my own village, to shock the story's readers with a graphic dramatization of the pointless violence and general inhumanity in their own lives."

The critical reaction to the story was unequivocally positive; the story quickly became a standard in anthologies and was adapted for television in 1952. In 1949, "The Lottery" was published in a short story collection of Jackson's titled The Lottery and Other Stories.

Jackson's second novel, Hangsaman (1951), contained elements similar to the mysterious real-life December 1, 1946, disappearance of an 18-year-old Bennington College sophomore Paula Jean Welden. This event, which remains unsolved to this day, took place in the wooded wilderness of Glastenbury Mountain near Bennington in southern Vermont, where Jackson and her family were living at the time. The fictional college depicted in Hangsaman is based in part on Jackson's experiences at Bennington College, as indicated by Jackson's papers in the Library of Congress. The event also served as inspiration for her short story "The Missing Girl" (first published in The Magazine of Fantasy and Science Fiction in 1957, and posthumously in Just an Ordinary Day [1996]).

The following year, she published Life Among the Savages, a semi-autobiographical collection of short stories based on her own life with her four children, many of which had been published prior in popular magazines such as Good Housekeeping, Woman's Day and Collier's. Semi-fictionalized versions of her marriage and the experience of bringing up four children, these works are "true-to-life funny-housewife stories" of the type later popularized by such writers as Jean Kerr and Erma Bombeck during the 1950s and 1960s.

Reluctant to discuss her work with the public, Jackson wrote in Stanley J. Kunitz and Howard Haycraft's Twentieth Century Authors (1955):

I very much dislike writing about myself or my work, and when pressed for autobiographical material can only give a bare chronological outline which contains, naturally, no pertinent facts. I was born in San Francisco in 1919 [sic] and spent most of my early life in California. I was married in 1940 to Stanley Edgar Hyman, critic and numismatist, and we live in Vermont, in a quiet rural community with fine scenery and comfortably far away from city life. Our major exports are books and children, both of which we produce in abundance. The children are Laurence, Joanne, Sarah, and Barry: my books include three novels, The Road Through the Wall, Hangsaman, The Bird's Nest and a collection of short stories, The Lottery. Life Among the Savages is a disrespectful memoir of my children.

"The persona that Jackson presented to the world was powerful, witty, even imposing," wrote Zoë Heller in The New Yorker. "She could be sharp and aggressive with fey Bennington girls and salesclerks and people who interrupted her writing. Her letters are filled with tartly funny observations. Describing the bewildered response of The New Yorker readers to 'The Lottery,' she notes, 'The number of people who expected Mrs. Hutchinson to win a Bendix washing machine at the end would amaze you.'"

=== The Haunting of Hill House and other works ===
In 1954, Jackson published The Bird's Nest (1954), which detailed a woman with multiple personalities and her relationship with her psychiatrist. One of Jackson's publishers, Roger Straus, deemed The Bird's Nest "a perfect novel", but the publishing house marketed it as a psychological horror story, which displeased her. Her following novel, The Sundial, was published four years later and concerned a family of wealthy eccentrics who believe they have been chosen to survive the end of the world. She later published two memoirs, Life Among the Savages and Raising Demons.

Jackson's fifth novel, The Haunting of Hill House (1959), follows a group of individuals participating in a paranormal study at a reportedly haunted mansion. The novel, which interpolated supernatural phenomena with psychology, went on to become a critically esteemed example of the haunted house story, described by Joanne Harris as "not only the best haunted-house story ever written, but also a quiet subversion of the ingénue trope in horror fiction, with a nod to Sartre's Huis Clos with its toxic menage a trois" and by Stephen King as one of the most important horror novels of the twentieth century.

Also in 1959, Jackson published the one-act children's musical The Bad Children, based on Hansel and Gretel.

=== Declining health and death ===
By the time The Haunting of Hill House had been published, Jackson suffered numerous health problems. She was a heavy smoker, resulting in chronic asthma. She also suffered from joint pain, exhaustion, and dizziness leading to fainting spells, which were attributed to a heart problem. Near the end of her life, Jackson also saw a psychiatrist for severe anxiety that had kept her housebound for extended periods of time, a problem worsened by a diagnosis of colitis, which made it physically difficult to travel even short distances from her home. To ease her anxiety and agoraphobia, the doctor prescribed barbiturates, which at that time were considered a safe, harmless drug. For many years, she also had periodic prescriptions for amphetamines for weight loss, which may have inadvertently aggravated her anxiety, leading to a cycle of prescription drug abuse using the two medications to counteract each other's effects. Any of these factors, or a combination of all of them, may have contributed to her declining health. Jackson confided to friends that she felt patronized in her role as a "faculty wife" and ostracized by the townspeople of North Bennington. Her dislike of this situation led to her increasing abuse of alcohol in addition to tranquilizers and amphetamines.

Despite her failing health, Jackson continued to write and publish several works in the 1960s, including her final novel, We Have Always Lived in the Castle (1962), a Gothic psychological horror novel. It was named by Time magazine as one of the "Ten Best Novels" of 1962. The following year, she published Nine Magic Wishes, an illustrated children's novel about a child who encounters a magician who grants him numerous enchanting wishes. The psychological aspects of her illness responded well to therapy, and by 1964 she began to resume normal activities, including a round of speaking engagements at writers' conferences, as well as planning a new novel titled Come Along with Me, which was to be a major departure from the style and subject matter of her previous works.

In 1965, Jackson died in her sleep at her home in North Bennington, at the age of 48. Her death was attributed to a coronary occlusion due to arteriosclerosis or cardiac arrest. She was cremated, as was her wish.

=== Posthumous publications ===
In 1968, Jackson's husband released a posthumous volume of her work, Come Along with Me, containing her unfinished last novel, as well as 14 previously uncollected short stories (among them "Louisa, Please Come Home") and three lectures she gave at colleges or writers' conferences in her last years.

In 1996, a crate of unpublished stories was found in a barn behind Jackson's house. A selection of those stories, along with previously uncollected stories from various magazines, were published in the 1996 volume Just an Ordinary Day. The title was taken from one of her stories for The Magazine of Fantasy & Science Fiction, "One Ordinary Day, with Peanuts".

Jackson's papers are available in the Library of Congress. In its August 5, 2013, issue The New Yorker published "Paranoia", which the magazine said was discovered at the library. Let Me Tell You, a collection of stories and essays by Jackson (mostly unpublished) was released in 2015.

In December 2020, the short story "Adventure on a Bad Night" was published for the first time, appearing in The Strand Magazine.

== Adaptations ==
- "The Lottery" has been adapted for radio, television, theater, and film (three times), notably, in 1969, as a short film that director Larry Yust made for Encyclopædia Britannica Films. The Academic Film Archive cited Yust's short "as one of the two bestselling educational films ever".
- Eleanor Parker starred in Hugo Haas' Lizzie (1957), based on The Bird's Nest, with a cast that included Richard Boone, Joan Blondell, and Marion Ross.
- In 1963, screenwriter Nelson Gidding adapted The Haunting of Hill House into the screenplay for the film The Haunting, with Julie Harris and Claire Bloom, directed by Robert Wise.
- Jackson's 1962 novel We Have Always Lived in the Castle was adapted for the stage by Hugh Wheeler in the mid-1960s. Directed by Garson Kanin, starring Shirley Knight, it opened on Broadway on October 19, 1966. The David Merrick production closed after only nine performances at the Ethel Barrymore Theatre, but Wheeler's play continues to be staged by regional theater companies.
- Joanne Woodward directed Come Along with Me (1982), adapted from Jackson's unfinished novel as an episode of American Playhouse, with a cast headed by Estelle Parsons and Sylvia Sidney.
- In 1999, The Haunting of Hill House was adapted a second time, into the critically panned The Haunting, directed by Jan de Bont and starring Lili Taylor, Liam Neeson, and Catherine Zeta-Jones.
- In 2010, We Have Always Lived in the Castle was adapted into a musical drama by Adam Bock and Todd Almond and premiered at Yale Repertory Theatre on September 17, 2010; the production was directed by Anne Kauffman.
- A film adaptation of We Have Always Lived in the Castle began production in 2016, with a release date originally set for summer of 2017, but premiered in September 2018. It stars Alexandra Daddario, Crispin Glover, Sebastian Stan, and Taissa Farmiga. The executive producer is Michael Douglas, with Jackson's son and literary executor, Laurence Jackson Hyman, as co-executive producer. Hyman was disappointed by earlier screen versions of his mother's work and, as such, decided to take a more active role.
- In 2018, Netflix produced The Haunting of Hill House, a ten-episode horror series loosely based on Jackson's 1959 novel of the same name. The series was released on October 12.
- In 2018, Kennedy/Marshall began development through Paramount Pictures of a feature-length film based on Jackson's short story "The Lottery". The screenplay will be written by Jake Wade Wall.

== Awards and honors ==
- 1944 – Best American Short Stories 1944: "Come Dance with Me in Ireland"
- 1949 – O. Henry Prize Stories 1949: "The Lottery"
- 1951 – Best American Short Stories 1951: "The Summer People"
- 1956 – Best American Short Stories 1956: "One Ordinary Day, with Peanuts"
- 1959 – New York Times Book Review's "Best Fiction of 1959" includes The Haunting of Hill House.
- 1960 – National Book Award nomination: The Haunting of Hill House
- 1961 – Mystery Writers of America Edgar Allan Poe Award nomination for Best Short Story: "Louisa, Please Come Home"
- 1962 – Time magazine's "Ten Best Novels" of the year includes We Have Always Lived in the Castle.
- 1964 – Best American Short Stories 1964: "Birthday Party"
- 1966 – Mystery Writers of America Edgar Allan Poe Award for Best Short Story: "The Possibility of Evil"
- 1966 – New York Times Book Review's "Best Fiction of 1966" includes The Magic of Shirley Jackson.
- 1968 – New York Times Book Review's "Best Fiction of 1968" includes Come Along with Me.
- 2006 - Mystery Writers of America Edgar Allan Poe Award nomination for Best Short Story: "Family Treasures"
- 2007 – The Shirley Jackson Award is established for outstanding achievement in the literature of psychological suspense, horror, and the dark fantastic.

== Legacy ==
In 2007, the Shirley Jackson Awards were established with permission of Jackson's estate. They are in recognition of her legacy in writing, and are awarded for outstanding achievement in the literature of psychological suspense, horror, and the dark fantastic. The awards are presented at Readercon.

In 2014, Susan Scarf Merrell published a well-received thriller, Shirley: A Novel, about Jackson, her husband, a fictional couple who move in with them, and a missing girl. In 2020, the novel was adapted into a feature film, Shirley, directed by Josephine Decker. Elisabeth Moss portrays Jackson and Michael Stuhlbarg costars as Stanley Edgar Hyman.

In 2016, journalist Ruth Franklin published Shirley Jackson: A Rather Haunted Life, a biography examining the influence of Jackson's upbringing, marriage, and addictions upon her work, while positioning Jackson as a major figure in American literature and examiner of postwar American anxieties via "domestic horror." Franklin's biography would go on to receive the National Book Critics Circle Award for Biography, the Edgar Award for Critical/Biographical Work, and the Bram Stoker Award for Best Non-Fiction. Franklin also wrote the foreword for the 2021 publication Shirley Jackson: A Companion. This collection features comprehensive critical engagement with Jackson's works, including those that have received less scholarly attention.

Since at least 2015, Jackson's adopted home of North Bennington has honored her legacy by celebrating Shirley Jackson Day on June 27, the day the fictional story "The Lottery" took place.

Jackson has been cited as an influence on a diverse set of authors, including Neil Gaiman, Stephen King, Donna Tartt, Sarah Waters, Nigel Kneale, Claire Fuller, Joanne Harris, and Richard Matheson.

=== Critical assessment ===
Lenemaja Friedman's Shirley Jackson (Twayne Publishers, 1975) was the first published survey of Jackson's life and work. Judy Oppenheimer also covers Shirley Jackson's life and career in Private Demons: The Life of Shirley Jackson (Putnam, 1988). S. T. Joshi's The Modern Weird Tale (2001) offers a critical essay on Jackson's work.

A comprehensive overview of Jackson's short fiction is Joan Wylie Hall's Shirley Jackson: A Study of the Short Fiction (Twayne Publishers, 1993). The only critical bibliography of Jackson's work is Paul N. Reinsch's A Critical Bibliography of Shirley Jackson, American Writer (1919–1965): Reviews, Criticism, Adaptations (Lewiston, New York: Edwin Mellen Press, 2001). Darryl Hattenhauer also provides a comprehensive survey of all of Jackson's fiction in Shirley Jackson's American Gothic (State University of New York Press, 2003). Bernice Murphy's Shirley Jackson: Essays on the Literary Legacy (McFarland & Company, 2005) is a collection of commentaries on Jackson's work. Colin Hains's Frightened by a Word: Shirley Jackson & Lesbian Gothic (2007) explores the lesbian themes in Jackson's major novels.

According to the post-feminist critic Elaine Showalter, Jackson's work is the single most important mid-twentieth-century body of literary output yet to have its value reevaluated by critics. In a March 4, 2009, podcast distributed by the business publisher The Economist, Showalter also noted that Joyce Carol Oates had edited a collection of Jackson's work called Shirley Jackson Novels and Stories that was published in the Library of America series.

Oates wrote of Jackson's fiction: "Characterized by the caprice and fatalism of fairy tales, the fiction of Shirley Jackson exerts a mordant, hypnotic spell."

Jackson's husband wrote in his preface to a posthumous anthology of her work that "she consistently refused to be interviewed, to explain or promote her work in any fashion, or to take public stands and be the pundit of the Sunday supplements. She believed that her books would speak for her clearly enough over the years". Hyman insisted that the dark visions found in Jackson's work were not, as some critics claimed, the product of "personal, even neurotic, fantasies", but, rather, comprised "a sensitive and faithful anatomy" of the Cold War era in which she lived, "fitting symbols for [a] distressing world of the concentration camp and the Bomb". Jackson may even have taken pleasure in the subversive impact of her work, as indicated by Hyman's statement that she "was always proud that the Union of South Africa banned 'The Lottery', and she felt that they at least understood the story".

The 1980s witnessed considerable scholarly interest in Jackson's work. Peter Kosenko, a Marxist critic, advanced an economic interpretation of "The Lottery" that focused on "the inequitable stratification of the social order". Sue Veregge Lape argued in her Ph.D. thesis that feminist critics who did not consider Jackson to be a feminist played a significant role in her lack of earlier critical attention. In contrast, Jacob Appel has written that Jackson was an "anti-regionalist writer" whose criticism of New England proved unpalatable to the American literary establishment.

In 2009, critic Harold Bloom published an extensive study of Jackson's work, challenging the notion that it was worthy of inclusion in the Western canon; Bloom wrote of "The Lottery", specifically: "Her art of narration [stays] on the surface, and could not depict individual identities. Even 'The Lottery' wounds you once, and once only."

== Works ==
=== Novels ===
- The Road Through the Wall (Farrar, Straus, 1948)
- Hangsaman (Farrar, Straus and Young, 1951)
- The Bird's Nest (Farrar, Straus and Young, 1954)
- The Sundial (Farrar, Straus and Cudahy, 1958)
- The Haunting of Hill House (Viking, 1959)
- We Have Always Lived in the Castle (Viking, 1962)
- Shirley Jackson: Four Novels of the 1940s & 50s, ed. Ruth Franklin (Library of America, 2020)

=== Short fiction ===
==== Collections ====
- The Lottery and Other Stories (Farrar, Straus, 1949)
- The Magic of Shirley Jackson (ed. Stanley Edgar Hyman; Farrar, Straus, 1966) Contains eleven short stories, all previously appearing in The Lottery and Other Stories, along with The Bird's Nest, Life Among the Savages, and Raising Demons.
- Come Along with Me: Part of a Novel, Sixteen Stories, and Three Lectures (ed. Stanley Edgar Hyman; Viking, 1968)
- Just an Ordinary Day (ed. Laurence & Sarah Hyman; Bantam, 1996)
- Shirley Jackson: Novels & Stories (ed. Joyce Carol Oates; Library of America, 2010)
- Let Me Tell You: New Stories, Essays, and Other Writings (ed. Laurence & Sarah Hyman; Random House, 2015)
- Dark Tales (Penguin, 2016) Contains seventeen stories, previously appearing in Come Along with Me, Just an Ordinary Day, and Let Me Tell You, with a preface by Ottessa Moshfegh.

==== Short stories ====
- "About Two Nice People", Ladies' Home Journal, July 1951
- "Account Closed", Good Housekeeping, April 1950
- "After You, My Dear Alphonse", The New Yorker, January 1943
- "Afternoon in Linen", The New Yorker, September 4, 1943
- "All the Girls Were Dancing", Collier's, November 11, 1950
- "All She Said Was Yes", Vogue, November 1, 1962
- "Alone in a Den of Cubs", Woman's Day, December 1953
- "Aunt Gertrude", Harper's, April 1954
- "The Bakery", Peacock Alley, November 1944
- "The Beautiful Stranger", Come Along with Me (Viking, 1968)
- "Birthday Party", Vogue, January 1, 1963
- "The Box", Woman's Home Companion, November 1952
- "Bulletin", The Magazine of Fantasy and Science Fiction, March 1954
- "The Bus", The Saturday Evening Post, March 27, 1965
- "Call Me Ishmael", Spectre, Fall 1939
- "A Cauliflower in Her Hair", Mademoiselle, December 1944
- "Charles", Mademoiselle, July 1948
- "The Clothespin Dolls", Woman's Day, March 1953
- "Colloquy", The New Yorker, August 5, 1944
- "Come Dance with Me in Ireland", The New Yorker, May 15, 1943
- "Concerning … Tomorrow", Syracusan, March 1939
- "The Daemon Lover ['The Phantom Lover']", Woman's Home Companion, February 1949
- "Daughter, Come Home", Charm, May 1944
- "Day of Glory", Woman's Day, February 1953
- "Dinner for a Gentleman", Shirley Jackson: A Rather Haunted Life, September 2016
- "Don't Tell Daddy", Woman's Home Companion, February 1954
- "Dorothy and My Grandmother and the Sailors", The Lottery and Other Stories (Farrar, Straus, 1949)
- "The Dummy", April 1949
- "Elizabeth", The Lottery and Other Stories (Farrar, Straus, 1949)
- "Every Boy Should Learn to Play the Trumpet", Woman's Home Companion, October 1956
- "Family Magician", Woman's Home Companion, September 1949
- "Family Treasures", Let Me Tell You, (Random House, 2015)
- "A Fine Old Firm", The New Yorker, March 4, 1944
- "The First Car Is the Hardest", Harper's, February 1952
- "Flower Garden", The Lottery and Other Stories (Farrar, Straus, 1949)
- "The Friends", Charm, November 1953
- "The Gift", Charm, December 1944
- "The Good Wife", Just an Ordinary Day (Bantam, 1996)
- "Got a Letter from Jimmy", The Lottery and Other Stories (Farrar, Straus, 1949)
- "A Great Voice Stilled", Playboy, March 1960
- "Had We But World Enough", Spectre, Spring 1940
- "Happy Birthday to Baby", Charm, November 1952
- "Home", Ladies' Home Journal, August 1965
- "The Homecoming", Charm, April 1945
- "The Honeymoon of Mrs Smith", Just an Ordinary Day (Bantam, 1996)
- "The House", Woman's Day, May 1952
- "I Don't Kiss Strangers", Just an Ordinary Day (Bantam, 1996)
- "Indians Live in Tents", Just an Ordinary Day (Bantam, 1996)
- "An International Incident", The New Yorker, September 12, 1943
- "I.O.U"., Just an Ordinary Day (Bantam, 1996)
- "The Island", New Mexico Quarterly Review, 1950, vol. 3
- "It Isn't the Money", The New Yorker, August 25, 1945
- "It's Only a Game", Harper's, May 1956
- "Jack the Ripper", Just an Ordinary Day (Bantam, 1996)
- "Journey with a Lady", Harper's, July 1952
- "Liaison a la Cockroach", Syracusan, April 1939
- "Like Mother Used to Make", The Lottery and Other Stories (Farrar, Straus, 1949)
- "Little Dog Lost", Charm, October 1943
- "A Little Magic", Woman's Home Companion, January 1956
- "Little Old Lady", Mademoiselle, September 1944
- "The Lottery", The New Yorker, June 26, 1948
- "Louisa, Please Come Home", Ladies' Home Journal, May 1960
- "The Lovely House", New World Writing, n.2, 1952
- "The Lovely Night", Collier's, April 8, 1950
- "Lucky to Get Away", Woman's Day, August 1953
- "The Man in the Woods", The New Yorker, April 28, 2014
- "Men with Their Big Shoes", Yale Review, March 1947
- "The Missing Girl", The Magazine of Fantasy and Science Fiction, December 1957
- "Monday Morning", Woman's Home Companion, November 1951
- "The Most Wonderful Thing", Good Housekeeping, June 1952
- "Mother Is a Fortune Hunter", Woman's Home Companion, May 1954
- "Mrs. Melville Makes a Purchase", Charm, October 1951
- "My Friend", Syracusan, December 1938
- "My Life in Cats", Spectre, Summer 1940
- "My Life with R.H. Macy", The New Republic, December 22, 1941
- "My Son and the Bully", Good Housekeeping, October 1949
- "Nice Day for a Baby", Woman's Home Companion, July 1952
- "Night We All Had Grippe", Harper's, January 1952
- "Nothing to Worry About", Charm, July 1953
- "Of Course", The Lottery and Other Stories (Farrar, Straus, 1949)
- "The Omen", The Magazine of Fantasy and Science Fiction, March 1958
- "On the House", The New Yorker, October 30, 1943
- "One Last Chance to Call", McCall's, April 1956
- "One Ordinary Day, With Peanuts", The Magazine of Fantasy and Science Fiction, January 1955
- "The Order of Charlotte's Going", Charm, July 1954
- "Paranoia", The New Yorker, August 5, 2013
- "Pillar of Salt", Mademoiselle, October 1948
- "The Possibility of Evil", The Saturday Evening Post, December 18, 1965
- "Queen of the May", McCall's, April 1955
- "The Renegade", Harper's, November 1949
- "Root of Evil", Fantastic, March–April 1953
- "The Second Mrs. Ellenoy", Reader's Digest, July 1953
- "Seven Types of Ambiguity", Story, 1943
- "Shopping Trip", Woman's Home Companion, June 1953
- "The Smoking Room", Just an Ordinary Day (Bantam, 1996)
- "The Sneaker Crisis", Woman's Day, October 1956
- "So Late on Sunday Morning", Woman's Home Companion, September 1953
- "The Sorcerer's Apprentice", McSweeney's #47, 2014
- "The Story We Used to Tell", Just an Ordinary Day (Bantam, 1996)
- "The Strangers", Collier's, May 10, 1952
- "Strangers in Town", The Saturday Evening Post, May 30, 1959
- "Summer Afternoon", Just an Ordinary Day (Bantam, 1996)
- "The Summer People", Charm, 1950
- "The Third Baby's the Easiest", Harper's, May 1949
- "The Tooth", The Hudson Review, 1949, vol. 1, no. 4
- "Trial by Combat", The New Yorker, December 16, 1944
- "The Very Strange House Next Door", Just an Ordinary Day (Bantam, 1996)
- "The Villager", The American Mercury, August 1944
- "Visions of Sugarplums", Woman's Home Companion, December 1952
- "What a Thought", Just an Ordinary Day (Bantam, 1996)
- "When Things Get Dark", The New Yorker, December 30, 1944
- "Whistler's Grandmother", The New Yorker, May 5, 1945
- "The Wishing Dime", Good Housekeeping, September 1949
- "The Witch", The Lottery and Other Stories (Farrar, Straus, 1949)
- "Worldly Goods", Woman's Day, May 1953
- "Y and I", Syracusan, October 1938
- "Y and I and the Ouija Board", Syracusan, November 1938

=== Children's works ===
- The Witchcraft of Salem Village (Random House, 1956)
- The Bad Children: A Play in One Act for Bad Children (Dramatic Publishing Company, 1958)
- Nine Magic Wishes (Crowell-Collier, 1963)
- Famous Sally (Harlin Quist, 1966)

=== Memoirs ===
- Life Among the Savages: An Uneasy Chronicle (Farrar, Straus and Young, 1953)
- Raising Demons (Farrar, Straus and Cudahy, 1957)
- Special Delivery: A Useful Book for Brand-New Mothers (Little, Brown, 1960)

== Works cited ==
- Bloom, Harold (2009). Shirley Jackson. Infobase Publishing. ISBN 978-1-438-11631-0.
- Franklin, Ruth (2016). Shirley Jackson: A Rather Haunted Life. Liveright. ISBN 978-0-871-40313-1.
- King, Stephen. Danse Macabre. Everest House, 1981.
- Kittredge, Mary (1985). "The Other Side of Magic: A Few Remarks About Shirley Jackson". In Schweitzer, Darrell (ed.). Discovering Modern Horror Fiction. Mercer Island, WA: Starmont House. pp. 3–12.
- Kosenko, Peter. "A Reading of Shirley Jackson's The Lottery. New Orleans Review, vol. 12, no. 1 (Spring 1985), pp. 27–32.
- Kunitz, Stanley (1973) [1955]. Twentieth Century Authors: A Biographical Dictionary of Modern Literature. Vol. 1. H. W. Wilson. ISBN 978-0-824-20049-7.
- Murphy, Bernice M., ed. (October 5, 2005). Shirley Jackson: Essays on the Literary Legacy. McFarland & Company. ISBN 978-0-7864-2312-5.
  - Downey, Dara; Jones, Darryl (October 5, 2005). "Shirley Jackson and Stephen King". In Murphy, Bernice M. (ed.). Shirley Jackson: Essays on the Literary Legacy. McFarland & Company. pp. 214–236. ISBN 978-0-7864-2312-5.
  - Murphy, Bernice M. (October 5, 2005). "'Do You Know Who I Am?': Reconsidering Shirley Jackson". In Murphy, Bernice M. (ed.). Shirley Jackson: Essays on the Literary Legacy. McFarland & Company. pp. 1–23. ISBN 978-0-7864-2312-5.
- Oppenheimer, Judy (1988). Private Demons: The Life of Shirley Jackson. Putnam. ISBN 978-0-449-90405-3.
- Shapiro, Laura. Something from the Oven: Reinventing Dinner in 1950s America.
- Shirley Jackson Papers. Library of Congress, Washington, DC
