= Bird's Nest (Shelby County, Kentucky) =

- U.S. National Register of Historic Places
- Location within Kentucky
- Location: On Kentucky Route 43 in Shelby County, Kentucky, 3 miles (4.8 km) south of Cropper, Kentucky
- Coordinates: 38°16′54″N 85°07′18″W
- Area: 1.3 acres (0.53 ha)
- Built: 1850
- Architectural style: Greek Revival
- MPS: Shelby County MRA
- NRHP reference No.: 88002859
- Added to NRHP: December 27, 1988

The Bird's Nest is a historic residence built c.1850 in Shelby County, Kentucky, about 3 miles (4.8 km) south of Cropper, Kentucky. It is listed on the National Register of Historic Places since 1988. The NRHP listing included two other contributing buildings and a non-contributing building.

== History ==
The property, with a house on it, was purchased by Philemon Bird from Amos Hall in 1845. Hall's house was demolished when the Bird's Nest house was built in 1850–51. It was a "family tradition" (meaning there is no documentation) that a Louisville "architect" built the house. It is in the Greek Revival style.

One of Philomen Bird's sons, Henry Bird was given a 100 acres (40 ha) parcel across Kentucky Route 43. A barn on that property is also listed on the National Register, as Bird Octagonal Mule Barn.

The Bird's Nest house property was passed to another of Philemon's sons, George Caldwell Bird, and then to his son, George Caldwell Bird Jr.

The buildings have been demolished or otherwise are no longer on the site. A concrete cylinder remains (38.28040°N 85.12256°W) and possibly house foundations. A likely former location of house is 38.2808°N 85.12449°W, at the top of the rise where a metal barn or other building now stands. Another likely location is forward on the rise at Bison corral (photographed) is at 38.28259°N 85.12697°W. Intersection of driveway with Cropper Rd., location from which Google Streetview is available: 38.28480°N 85.12766°W. Supposed location of Bird Octagonal Mule Barn: 38.28773°N 85.12725°W, which has also apparently disappeared.

Locations may be seen together in Map of all coordinates: OpenStreetMap (clickable link available to the right of this page).

Its NRHP listing followed a 1986–1987 study of the historic resources of Shelby County. It is located within study area for routing of a new highway connecting Interstate 65 and Interstate 71 avoiding Louisville.

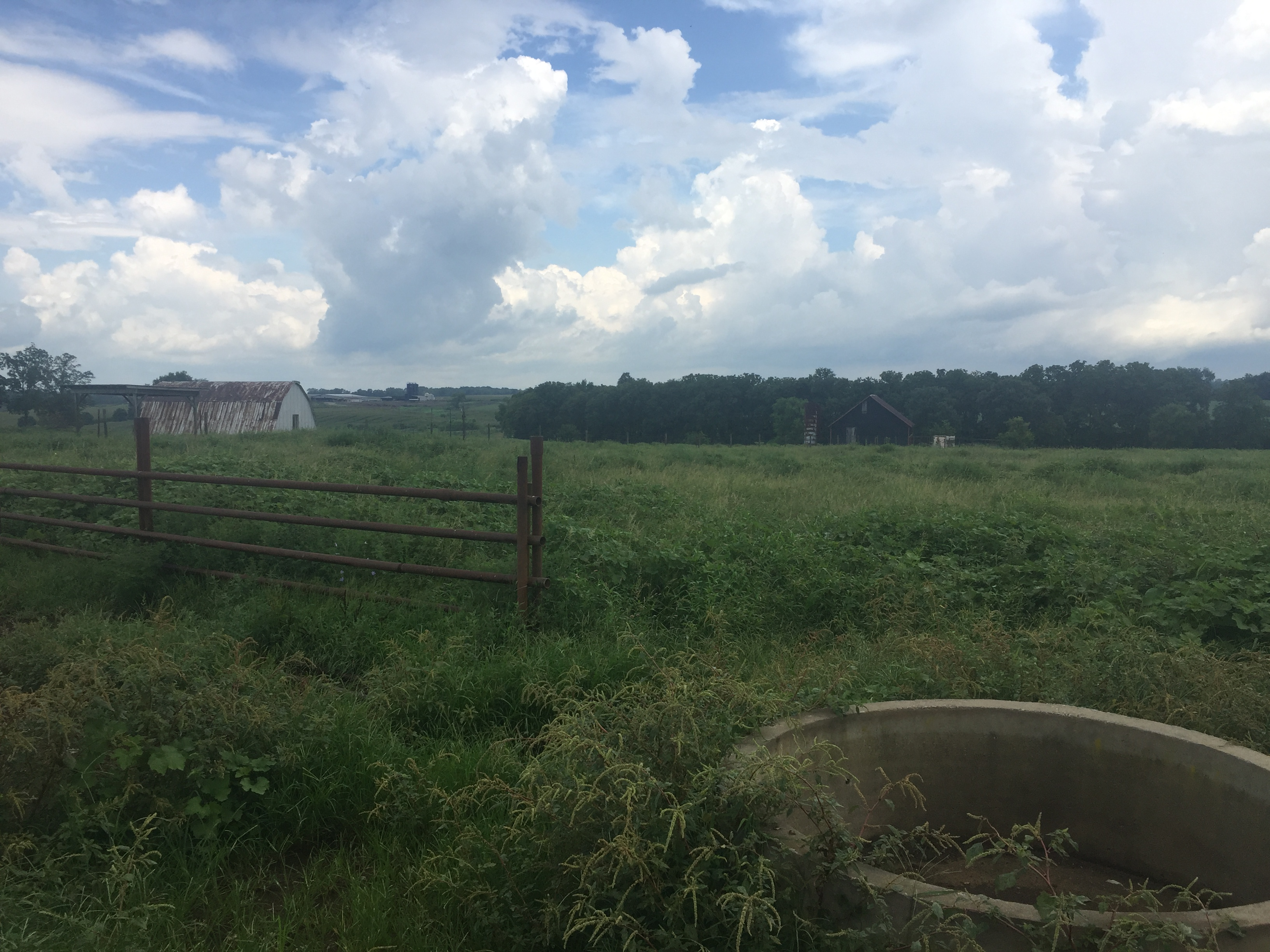
View of cylinder with a barn and a house beyond

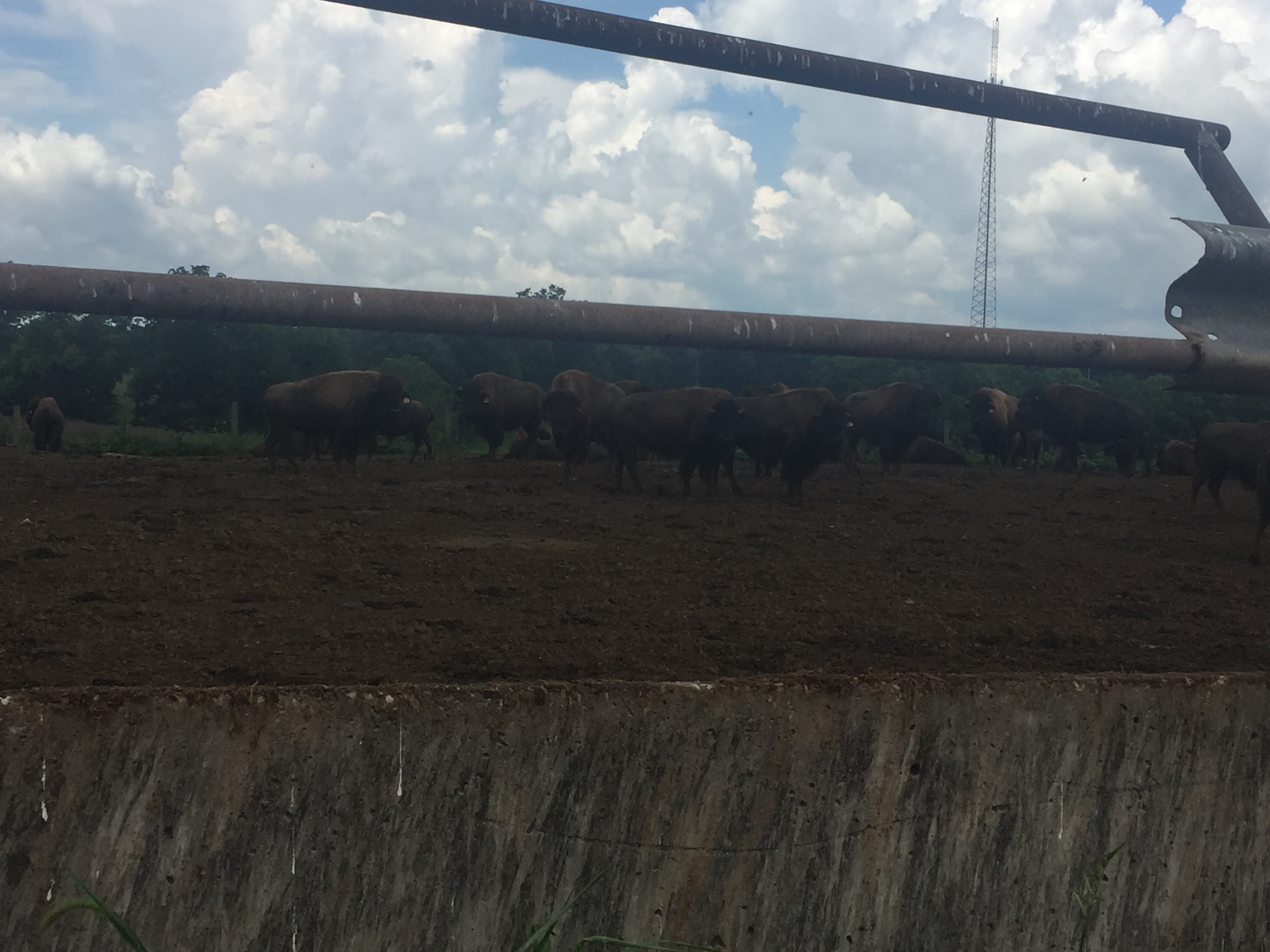
Bison pen

== See also ==
- Philomen Bird House, also owned by Philomen Bird and NRHP-listed
