= Ken Tzipor =

Hebrew children's poem by Hayim Nahman Bialik

"Ken Tzipor קן ציפור"

Song
- Language: Hebrew
- Written: by Hayim Nahman Bialik
- Genre: Children's song
- Composer: Yitzhak Edel

Ken Tzipor (Hebrew: קַן צִפּוֹר) is a Hebrew children's poem by Hayim Nahman Bialik, later set to music by Yitzhak Edel and other composers. The poem describes a bird's nest nestled among the trees, holding three eggs, each with a tiny chick asleep inside.

== Poem text ==
A nest for the bird
Between the trees,
And in the nest
Three little eggs.

And in each egg
Hush, do not wake
There sleeps
A tiny chick.

== Background ==
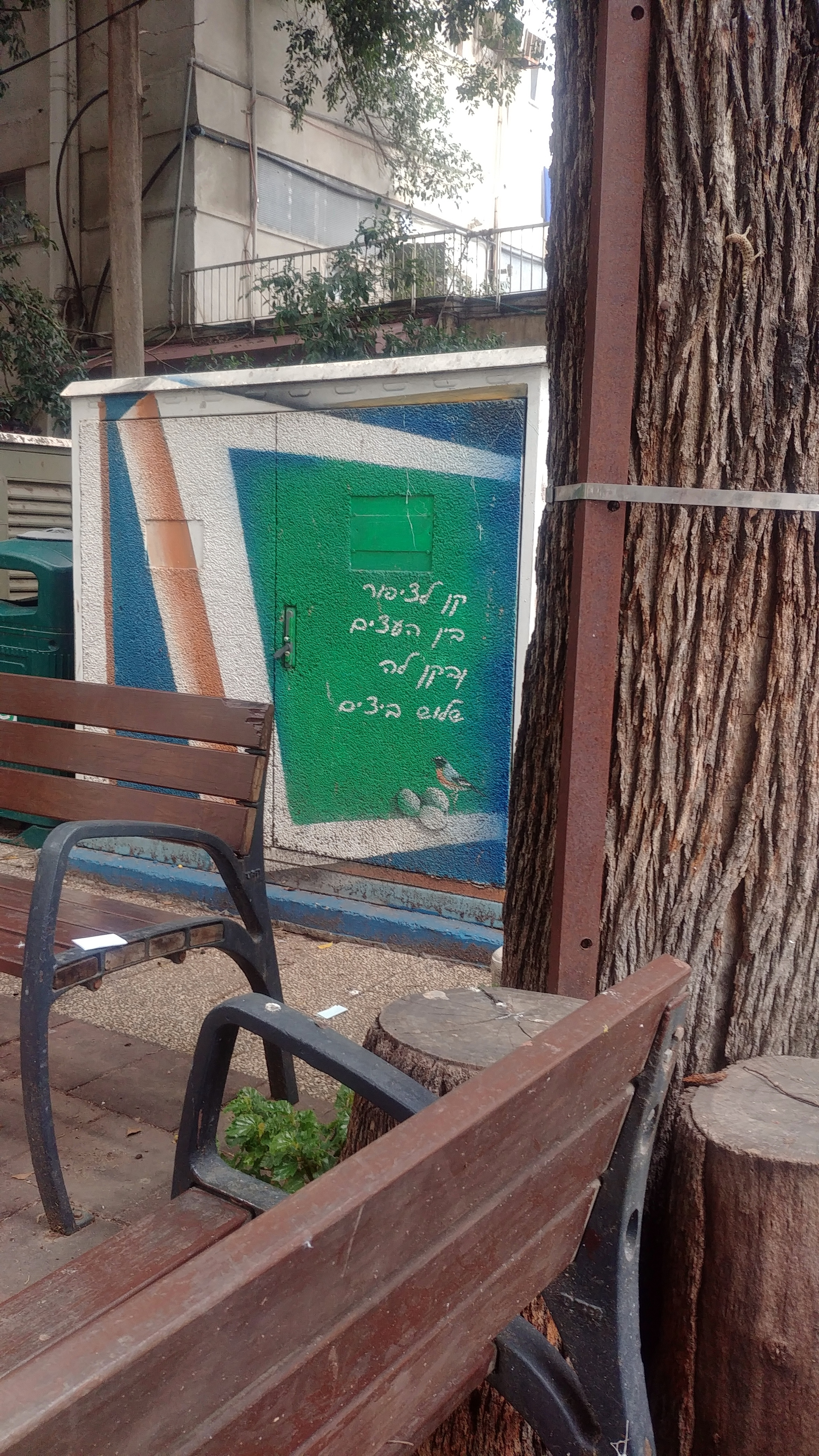
"Ken Tzipor" (Bird's nest) a children's song by the poet Haim Nachman Bialik was painted on a wall near the city hall of Ramat Gan in Israel

At the time the poem was written, the Hebrew word "ephroach" (אפרוח) was a synonym for "gozal" (גוזל), both meaning chick or fledgling. The poem focuses on the natural world and its rhythm, capturing the serenity and anticipation of new life.

The poem was widely disseminated in collections of children's songs and became part of the educational curriculum in preschools and elementary schools in Mandatory Palestine and later the State of Israel.

== Musical settings ==
"Bird's Nest" was composed by Yitzhak Edel and has been performed by several prominent musicians and arrangers, including Nahum Nardi and Uri Gevaon. The opening melody is notably similar to that of the Hanukkah song "Ner Li", though it is not identical.

== Cultural impact ==
Literary scholar Ziva Shamir analyzed the poem's structure as concentric circles (like a matryoshka doll), guiding the reader's focus inward—from the trees, to the nest, to the egg, and finally to the chick. She notes that this pattern also appears in some of Bialik's canonical adult poems.

Public art installations have been inspired by the poem. On Chen Boulevard in Rehovot, four colorful sculptures illustrate the imagery of "Bird's Nest": a bird with three egg-shaped hollows, two egg-shaped benches, and a large hollow egg with a bench encircling a chick inside. The sculptures are accompanied by signage featuring the full text of the poem.

Graffiti of the poem has also appeared on public walls in Ramat Gan, including near the municipal building and the Ramat Gan Safari.
