= The Lottery =

1948 short story by Shirley Jackson

- Short story by Shirley Jackson
- Country: United States
- Language: English
- Genres: Short story Dystopian

Publication
- Publisher: The New Yorker
- Publication date: June 26, 1948

"The Lottery" is a short story by Shirley Jackson that was first published in The New Yorker on June 26, 1948. (Note: The story was reprinted in the issue dated July 27, 2020.) The story describes a fictional small American community that observes an annual tradition known as "the lottery", which is intended to ensure a good harvest and purge the town of bad omens. The lottery, its preparations, and its execution are all described in detail, though it is not revealed until the end what actually happens to the person selected by the random lottery: the selected member of the community is stoned to death by the other townspeople.

Jackson and The New Yorker were both surprised by the initial negative response from readers; subscriptions were canceled and large amounts of hate mail were sent throughout the summer of its first publication, with Jackson receiving at least 10 letters per day. The Union of South Africa banned it.

The story has been dramatized several times, including as a radio drama, film, and graphic novel. It has been subjected to considerable sociological and literary analysis and has been described as one of the most famous short stories in the history of American literature.

== Plot ==
Details of contemporary small-town American life are embroidered upon a description of an annual rite known as "the lottery". In a small, unnamed village of about 300 residents, the locals are in an excited yet nervous mood on June 27. Children pile up stones as the adults assemble for their annual event, practiced to ensure a good harvest; Old Man Warner quotes an old proverb, "Lottery in June, corn be heavy soon." However, some nearby villages have already discontinued the lottery, and rumors are spreading that others are considering doing the same. Some in the village respond that the lottery has always been conducted and should continue every year henceforth.

The lottery preparations start the night before, with coal merchant Mr. Summers and postmaster Mr. Graves drawing up a list of all the extended families in town and preparing one paper slip per family. The slips are folded and placed in an age-stained black wooden box which is stored in a safe at Mr. Summers' office until the lottery is scheduled to begin.

The initial drawing takes place to choose one family. There is a sense of relief in those not chosen. In one case, a family member is sent to pass word to their injured father that their family was not picked. Bill Hutchinson draws the only marked slip in the box, and his wife Tessie complains that he was rushed into making his choice, despite her having been in a previously jovial mood and seemingly unbothered by the lottery system. Since their family consists of only one household, the second drawing to choose a household is skipped.

For the final drawing, one slip is placed in the box for each member of the Hutchinson household: Bill, Tessie, and each of their three children. Tessie tries to force her older married daughter and her husband to participate with them, even though it is a known rule that daughters draw with their husband's families. Each of the five draws a slip, and Tessie gets the marked one. The townspeople, including Tessie's young son Davy, pick up the gathered stones and begin throwing them at her as Tessie screams about the unfairness of the lottery.

== Reception ==
=== Readers ===
The New Yorker received a "torrent of letters" inquiring about the story, "the most mail the magazine had ever received in response to a work of fiction". Many readers demanded an explanation of the situation in the story, and a month after the initial publication, Jackson responded in the San Francisco Chronicle (July 22, 1948):

Explaining just what I had hoped the story to say is very difficult. I suppose, I hoped, by setting a particularly brutal ancient rite in the present and in my own village to shock the story's readers with a graphic dramatization of the pointless violence and general inhumanity in their own lives.

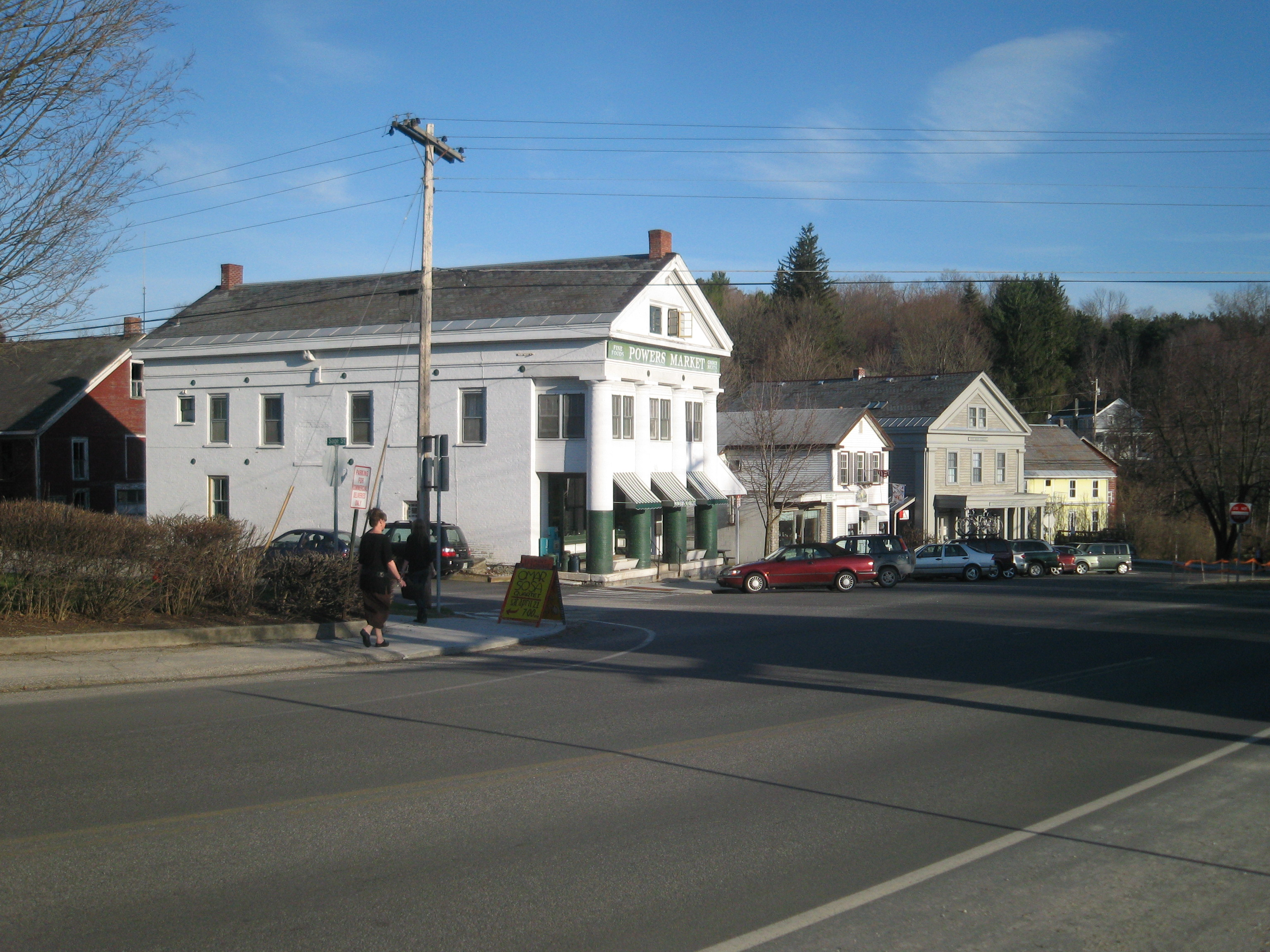
North Bennington, Vermont

Jackson lived in North Bennington, Vermont, and her comment reveals that she had Bennington in mind when she wrote "The Lottery". In a 1960 lecture, printed in her 1968 collection Come Along with Me, she recalled the hate mail she received in 1948:

One of the most terrifying aspects of publishing stories and books is the realization that they are going to be read, and read by strangers. I had never fully realized this before, although I had of course in my imagination dwelt lovingly upon the thought of the millions and millions of people who were going to be uplifted and enriched and delighted by the stories I wrote. It had simply never occurred to me that these millions and millions of people might be so far from being uplifted that they would sit down and write me letters I was downright scared to open; of the three-hundred-odd letters that I received that summer I can count only thirteen that spoke kindly to me, and they were mostly from friends. Even my mother scolded me: "Dad and I did not care at all for your story in The New Yorker", she wrote sternly; "it does seem, dear, that this gloomy kind of story is what all you young people think about these days. Why don't you write something to cheer people up?"

The New Yorker kept no records of the phone calls, but letters addressed to Jackson were forwarded to her. That summer she regularly took home 10 to 12 forwarded letters each day. She also received weekly packages from The New Yorker containing letters and questions addressed to the magazine or editor Harold Ross, plus carbon copies of the magazine's responses mailed to letter writers.

Curiously, there are three main themes which dominate the letters of that first summer—three themes which might be identified as bewilderment, speculation and plain old-fashioned abuse. In the years since then, during which the story has been anthologized, dramatized, televised, and even—in one completely mystifying transformation—made into a ballet, the tenor of letters I receive has changed. I am addressed more politely, as a rule, and the letters largely confine themselves to questions like what does this story mean? The general tone of the early letters, however, was a kind of wide-eyed, shocked innocence. People at first were not so much concerned with what the story meant; what they wanted to know was where these lotteries were held, and whether they could go there and watch.

— Shirley Jackson, Come Along with Me

=== Critical interpretations ===
Helen E. Nebeker's essay "'The Lottery': Symbolic Tour de Force" in American Literature (March 1974) claims that every major name in the story has a special significance.

By the end of the first two paragraphs, Jackson has carefully indicated the season, time of ancient excess and sacrifice, and the stones, most ancient of sacrificial weapons. She has also hinted at larger meanings through name symbolism. "Martin", Bobby's surname, derives from a Middle English word signifying ape or monkey. This, juxtaposed with "Harry Jones" (in all its commonness) and "Dickie Delacroix" (of-the-Cross) urges us to an awareness of the Hairy Ape within us all, veneered by a Christianity as perverted as "Delacroix", vulgarized to "Dellacroy" by the villagers. Horribly, at the end of the story, it will be Mrs. Delacroix, warm and friendly in her natural state, who will select a stone "so large she had to pick it up with both hands" and will encourage her friends to follow suit... "Mr. Adams", at once progenitor and martyr in the Judeo-Christian myth of man, stands with "Mrs. Graves"—the ultimate refuge or escape of all mankind—in the forefront of the crowd.

Fritz Oehlschlaeger, in "The Stoning of Mistress Hutchinson: Meaning and Context in 'The Lottery'" (Essays in Literature, 1988), wrote:

The name of Jackson's victim links her to Anne Hutchinson, whose Antinomian beliefs, found to be heretical by the Puritan hierarchy, resulted in her banishment from Massachusetts in 1638. While Tessie Hutchinson is no spiritual rebel, to be sure, Jackson's allusion to Anne Hutchinson reinforces her suggestions of a rebellion lurking within the women of her imaginary village. Since Tessie Hutchinson is the protagonist of "The Lottery", there is every indication that her name is indeed an allusion to Anne Hutchinson, the American religious dissenter. She was excommunicated despite an unfair trial, while Tessie questions the tradition and correctness of the lottery as well as her humble status as a wife. It might as well be this insubordination that leads to her selection by the lottery and stoning by the angry mob of villagers.

The Lottery has been compared to the Biblical story of Achan, Joshua 7. In both accounts, there is the drawing of lots by family heads, then by individuals. Then the marked person is stoned.

In "Arbitrary Condemnation and Sanctioned Violence in Shirley Jackson's 'The Lottery'" (December 2004), Patrick J. Shields suggests there is a connection between the death penalty and "The Lottery" when writing:

Though these ritual executions seem to have the support of the entire community and have been carried out for as long as everyone can seem to remember, a doubt seems to linger. Mrs. Adams tells us, "Some places have already quit the lotteries" (S. Jackson, 1999, p.77). On another level, we as readers feel quite uncomfortable observing such blind obedience to tradition among the villagers. And further, we as readers may be likely to make a connection as we witness modern day executions and realize that there is arbitrariness in these instances as well... It is hard for some to imagine abolition of capital punishment in our culture. They equate abolition with undermining law and morality. But it is precisely law and morality that are being undermined by the arbitrary practice of capital punishment.

In her 2005 book Shirley Jackson: Essays on the Literary Legacy, Bernice Murphy comments on the 1992 Simpsons episode "Dog of Death" making reference to "The Lottery". In the Simpsons episode, news anchor Kent Brockman reports that excited state lottery players have borrowed every copy of Shirley Jackson's "The Lottery" from the local library in search of strategies to win the jackpot. Brockman clarifies, "Of course, the book does not contain any hints on how to win the lottery. It is, rather, a chilling tale of conformity gone mad." This prompts protagonist Homer Simpson to discard his own copy of the book. Murphy comments that this scene displays some of the most contradictory things about Jackson: "It says a lot about the visibility of Jackson's most notorious tale that more than 50 years after its initial creation it is still famous enough to warrant a mention in the world's most famous sitcom. The fact that Springfield's citizenry also miss the point of Jackson's story completely ... can perhaps be seen as an indication of a more general misrepresentation of Jackson and her work."

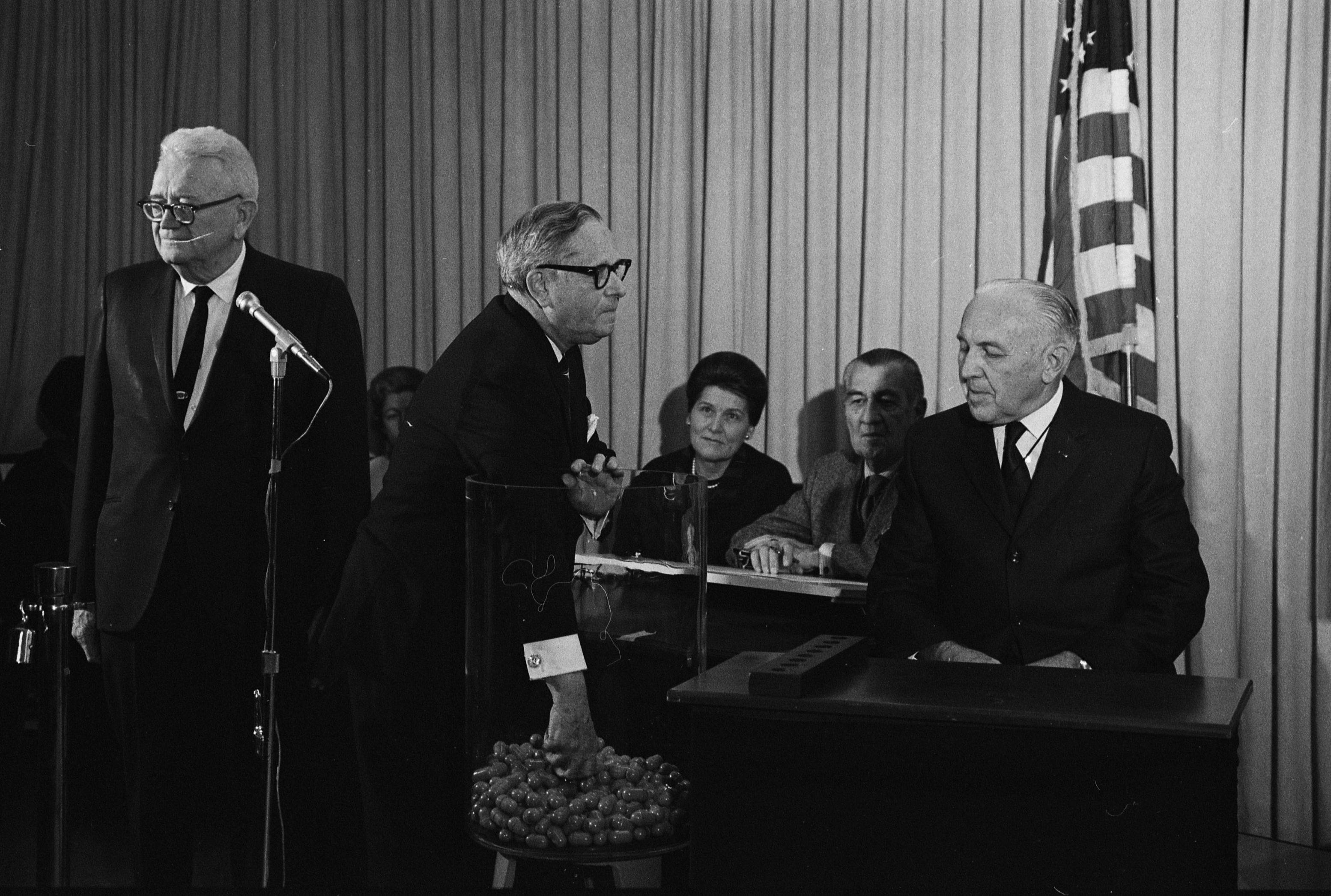
Image of the 1969 draft lottery to choose conscripts for the Vietnam War.

Others have made comparisons between the lottery and the military draft, whereby young men aged 18–25 were selected at random for military service by the Selective Service System. The story was written just three years after the end of World War II, in which ten million American men were drafted and over 400,000 died, and was published just two days after the enactment of the Military Selective Service Act, which re-established the draft.

== Adaptations ==
In addition to numerous reprints in magazines, anthologies, and textbooks as well as comic adaptation, "The Lottery" has been adapted for radio, live television, a 1953 ballet, films in 1969 and 1996, a TV movie, an opera, and a one-act play by Brainerd Duffield.

=== 1951 radio version ===
A radio adaptation by NBC was broadcast March 14, 1951, as an episode of the anthology series NBC Presents: Short Story. Writer Ernest Kinoy expanded the plot to include scenes at various characters' homes before the lottery and a conversation between Bill and Tessie Hutchinson (Bill suggests leaving town before the lottery happens, but Tessie refuses because she wants to go shopping at Floyd Summers's store after the lottery is over). Kinoy deleted certain characters, including two of the Hutchinsons' three children, and added at least one character, John Gunderson, a schoolteacher who publicly objects to the lottery being held, and at first refuses to draw. Finally, Kinoy included an ending scene describing the townspeople's post-lottery activities and an afterword, in which the narrator suggested: "Next year, maybe there won't be a Lottery. It's up to all of us. Chances are, there will be, though." The production was directed by Andrew C. Love.

=== Television adaptations ===
Ellen M. Violett wrote the first television adaptation, seen on Albert McCleery's Cameo Theatre (1950–1955).

The story served as the inspiration for the 2008 South Park episode "Britney's New Look".

The story was also parodied in the 2014 Regular Show episode "Terror Tales of the Park IV", in the segment "The Hole" (a.k.a. "The Wonderful Adventure of the Mysterious Hole in the Park"), described as "reimagining some classic literature".

=== 1969 film ===
Larry Yust's short film The Lottery (1969), produced as part of Encyclopædia Britannica's "Short Story Showcase" series, was ranked by the Academic Film Archive "as one of the two bestselling educational films ever". It has an accompanying ten-minute commentary film Discussion of "The Lottery" by University of Southern California English professor James Durbin. Featuring Olive Dunbar, Jim Bowles, William Fawcett, Irene Tedrow and Ed Begley Jr. in his third film appearance, Yust's adaptation has an atmosphere of naturalism and small-town authenticity with its shots of pickup trucks in Fellows, California, and the townspeople of Fellows and Taft, California.

=== 1996 TV film ===
Anthony Spinner's feature-length TV film The Lottery, which premiered September 29, 1996, on NBC, expands upon the original Shirley Jackson story. It was nominated for a 1997 Saturn Award for Best Single Genre Television Presentation.

=== Graphic novel ===
In 2016, Miles Hyman, a grandson of Jackson, created a graphic novel adaption titled Shirley Jackson's "The Lottery": The Authorized Graphic Adaptation. His version abbreviates the wording of the source work and relies on graphics to portray other aspects of the narrative. He also wrote his own introduction. Alyson Ward of the Houston Chronicle wrote the graphics "push a little further than his grandmother's words did", though she stated Hyman's version reveals details of the story earlier than in the original work.

== See also ==
- "The Lottery in Babylon"
- The Wicker Man
- Midsommar
- "The Ones Who Walk Away from Omelas"
- Curdle Creek
