= Stanley Edgar Hyman =

American literary critic

- Born: June 11, 1919; Brooklyn, New York City, U.S.
- Died: July 29, 1970 (aged 51); North Bennington, Vermont, U.S.
- Education: Syracuse University
- Occupations: Writer; critic; academic
- Spouses: Shirley Jackson (m. 1940; died 1965) Phoebe Pettingell (m. 1966)
- Children: 5
- Writing career
- Period: 1940–1970

Stanley Edgar Hyman (June 11, 1919 – July 29, 1970) was an American literary critic who wrote primarily about critical methods: the distinct strategies critics use in approaching literary texts. He was the husband of writer Shirley Jackson.

== Life ==
Hyman was born in the Brooklyn borough of New York, the son of Moe Hyman, and raised Orthodox Jewish. He graduated from Syracuse University in 1940, where he met Shirley Jackson. After reading one of Jackson's stories, Hyman declared that he was going to marry the author. They had four children together. He was a staff writer for The New Yorker for much of his life, and although he did not possess a graduate degree, taught at Bennington College in Bennington, Vermont. From 1961 to 1965, Hyman was the literary critic of The New Leader. He did not believe in monogamy and had numerous affairs during their marriage, often with his students.

Hyman was a consistent supporter of his wife's work and resented the lack of recognition she received during her lifetime. He wrote, "I think that the future will find her powerful visions of suffering and inhumanity increasingly significant and meaningful, and that Shirley Jackson's work is among that small body of literature produced in our time that seems apt to survive." Hyman also controlled their finances (meting out portions of Jackson's earnings to her as he saw fit), despite the fact that after the success of "The Lottery" and later work she earned far more than he did.

A year after Jackson's death in 1965, Hyman married Phoebe Pettingell, who had been a classmate of his daughter, Joanne, and his student at Bennington College. Three months after Hyman's death from a suspected heart attack on July 29, 1970, she gave birth to his last child, a son named Malcolm (1970–2009), who became a research fellow in the Department of Classics at Harvard University and later at the Max Planck Institute for the History of Science.

Although more likely to be remembered today as the husband of Jackson (he edited a posthumous collection of her work), Hyman was influential in the development of literary theory during the 1940s and 1950s. Equally skeptical of every major critical methodology of his time, he worked out an early instance of a critical theory, exploring ways that critics can be foiled by their own methods. "Each critic," Hyman wrote in The Armed Vision, "tends to have a master metaphor or series of metaphors in terms of which he sees the critical function ... this metaphor then shapes, informs, and sometimes limits his work." Hyman saw it as his own critical task to point out these overriding themes by which, tacitly, other critics organized their work and their thinking.

Hyman was also a noted jazz critic, who wrote hundreds of essays on the subject in addition to his career as a writer and teacher. He had an important influence on Ralph Ellison's career, although they had many disagreements.

== Bibliography ==
=== Books ===
- The Armed Vision: A Study in the Methods of Modern Literary Criticism. New York: Knopf, 1947.
- The Critical Performance: An Anthology of American and British Literary Criticism in Our Century. New York: Vintage Books, 1956.
- Poetry and Criticism: Five Revolutions in Literary Taste. New York: Atheneum, 1961.
- The Tangled Bank: Darwin, Marx, Frazer and Freud as Imaginative Writers. New York: Atheneum, 1962.
- The Critic's Credentials: Essays and Reviews. Ed. Phoebe Pettingell. New York: Atheneum, 1978.
- Standards: A Chronicle of Books for Our Time. New York: Horizon Press, 1966.
- Iago: Some Approaches to the Illusion of His Motivation. New York: Atheneum, 1970.

=== Essays and reporting ===
- "Notes and Comment". The Talk of the Town. The New Yorker. 25 (50): 21. February 4, 1950. (Note: Discusses the merits of different phonograph record playing speeds.)

———————
