= Andrew Hewitt =

- Born: 28 March 1976 (age 50); England, UK
- Genres: Film scores
- Occupations: Composer, musician
- Years active: 2000–present
- Website: www.andrewhewitt.co

Andrew Hewitt (born 28 March 1976) is an English composer based in Los Angeles.

== Training ==
Hewitt received classical training from childhood as a pianist and tenor singer. He earned music scholarships to the Westminster Abbey Choir, Uppingham School, the National Youth Music Theatre, St John's College, Cambridge, and the Guildhall School of Music and Drama. Before university, he toured globally with choral groups, and after graduating in 2000, he continued performing in concerts, tours, and CD recordings with classical ensembles such as John Eliot Gardiner's Monteverdi Choir, Robert King's The King's Consort, The John Rutter Singers, Synergy, Opera Rara, the London Voices, and Metro Voices. His performances spanned contemporary premieres, session choirs, and baroque, classical, and avant-garde works.

At Abbey Road and Air Studios he performed on many film scores for such conductors as John Williams and Howard Shore, including The Lord of the Rings film trilogy, Harry Potter, Star Wars, and Pirates of the Caribbean.

== Film scoring ==
Hewitt is an associate member of PRS for Music and has recently joined the World Soundtrack Academy and BAFTA. He combines his passion for film with classical training, recording, and concert experience, orchestrating and conducting his scores, which he enhances with electronic textures in his studio.

=== Awards and nominations ===
- BAFTA Nomination as Best New Composer for Film and TV

=== Motion pictures ===
- We Have Always Lived in the Castle – directed by Stacie Passon
- Old Boys – directed by Toby MacDonald, prod Luke Morris
- A Crooked Somebody – directed by Trevor White, starring Ed Harris, Rich Sommer
- The Divide – directed by Katharine Round, featuring Kwame Anthony Appiah, Noam Chomsky, Kate Pickett, Richard Wilkinson
- Mojave – directed by William Monahan, starring Garrett Hedlund, Oscar Isaac, Mark Wahlberg
- The Stanford Prison Experiment – directed by Kyle Alvarez, starring Michael Angarano, Ezra Miller
- Bill – directed by Richard Bracewell, starring Ben Willbond, Laurence Rickard
- The Double – directed by Richard Ayoade, starring Jesse Eisenberg & Mia Wasikowska
- The Sea – directed by Stephen Brown, starring Ciarán Hinds, violin soloist Hilary Hahn
- The Brass Teapot – directed by Ramaa Mosley, starring Juno Temple & Michael Angarano
- Four Horsemen – directed by Ross Ashcroft, Motherlode, with Noam Chomsky
- Submarine – directed by Richard Ayoade, Warp Films, starring Sally Hawkins, prod Ben Stiller
- Cuckoo – directed by Richard Bracewell, Punk Cinema, starring Richard E. Grant

=== Television series ===
- Hindenburg: Titanic of the Skies – created by Sean Grundy, TV movie, Pioneer
- Garth Marenghi's Darkplace – created by Richard Ayoade, Avalon
- Man to Man with Dean Learner – created by Richard Ayoade, Avalon
- Catastrophe – Discovery US, Pioneer, C4
- Extreme Hotels – Pioneer, Travel
- National Geographic – three documentaries
- The Stuarts – BBC
- Whatever Happened to Harry Hill?
- Globe Trekker
- Parking Tribunal – BBC
- Parasomnias – BBC
- Krystal Klairvoyant
