= Bristol Festival of Ideas =

Annual UK discussion and debate event

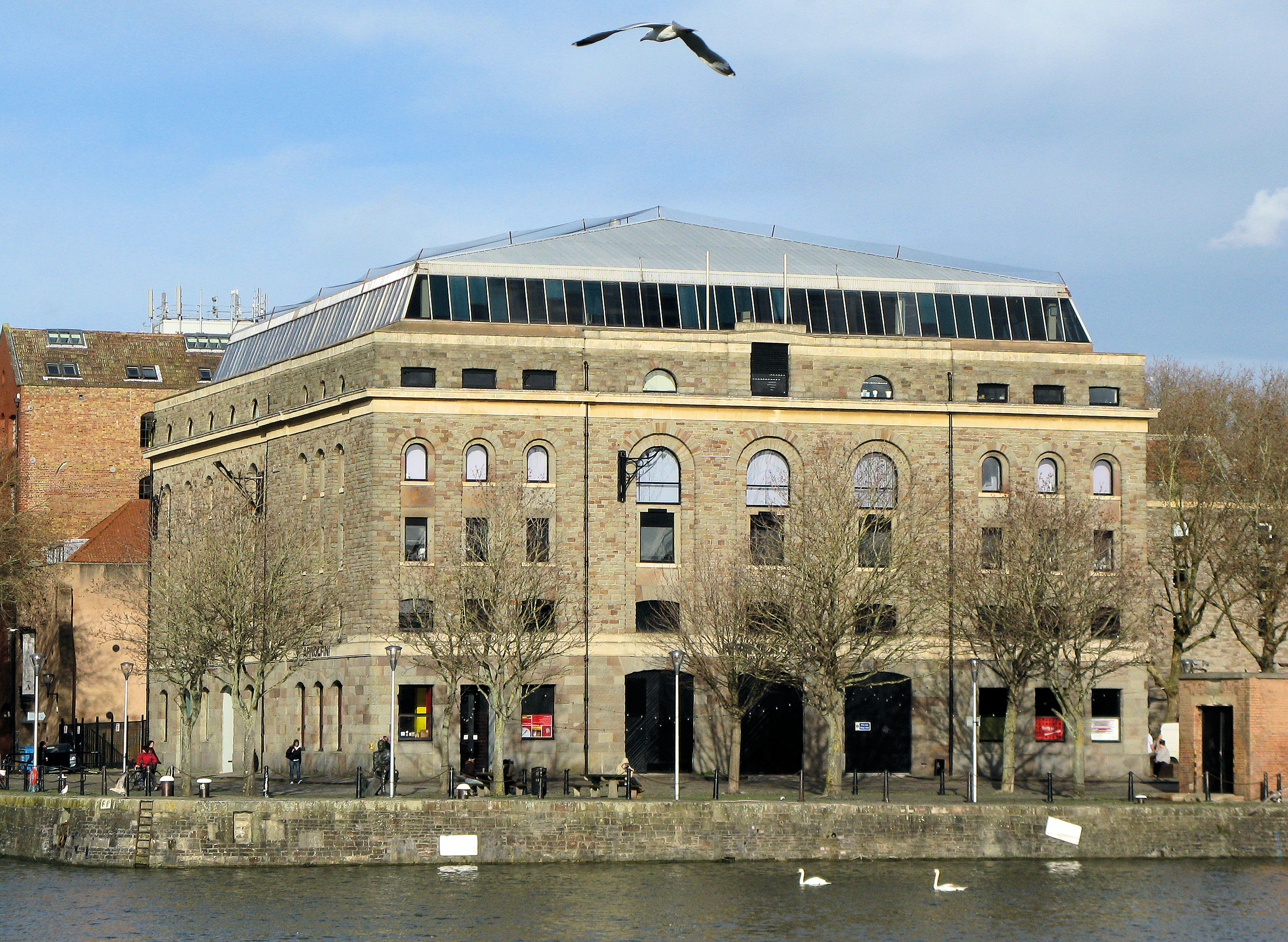
- The Arnolfini, Bristol, one of the main venues for Festival events
- Genre: Arts, science, culture, literature, politics, etc.
- Dates: Throughout year: main Festival programme each May
- Locations: Bristol, England – Arnolfini, Watershed Media Centre, St. George's, We The Curious, City Hall, Tobacco Factory, Victoria Rooms, Wills Memorial Building, etc.
- Years active: 2005–2024
- Website: Bristol Festival of Ideas

The Bristol Festival of Ideas is a project established in Bristol, England, which aims "to stimulate people's minds and passions with an inspiring programme of discussion and debate". It was first set up in 2005, as part of the city's ultimately unsuccessful bid to become the European Capital of Culture for 2008, and continues to maintain a programme of debates and other events, including an annual festival each May.

The Festival also awards an annual book prize, worth £7,500, to a book which "presents new, important and challenging ideas, which is rigorously argued, and which is engaging and accessible". It is one of the largest book prizes in the United Kingdom.

The Festival takes place in a range of venues across the city, including the Arnolfini, the Watershed Media Centre, St. George's, We The Curious, City Hall, the Tobacco Factory, and the Victoria Rooms. It is organised by Bristol Creative Projects (BCP – formerly the Bristol Cultural Development Partnership), Arts Council England, Bristol City Council, and GWE BusinessWest, a private sector organisation promoting economic development in the area, and also works closely with universities in the area and other agencies. The Director of the Festival is Andrew Kelly, who was appointed Director of the Bristol Cultural Development Partnership in 1993.

As of 2023 the festival is a project of Bristol Ideas, which replaced BCDP in March 2021.

== Events and contributors ==
=== 2005 ===
The first festival, held 16–21 May 2005, included speakers Paul Ormerod, A. C. Grayling, Julia Neuberger, Joanna Bourke, John N. Gray, Colin Tudge, Marek Kohn, Jack Cohen, Ian Stewart, John Carey, John Mortimer, Francis Spufford, Deyan Sudjic, Nick Hornby, Julian Baggini, Claudia Hammond, Dick King-Smith, Roger McGough, Brian Patten, David Crystal, Ben Crystal, and Pat Kane Kane – formerly a musician in the band Hue and Cry – was appointed as the UK's first "thinker in residence", with a remit to be "a 'constructive heckler' – identifying broad themes that emerge from the discussions, making connections between realms of knowledge ... being a 'contrarian catalyst'".

=== 2006 ===
The festival, from 9–25 May, was themed around the bicentenary of Isambard Kingdom Brunel. It looked at "Brunellian themes of creativity and progress and apply[ing] these to issues of contemporary concern and opportunity." Speakers included Richard Dowden, Ekow Eshun, A. C. Grayling, Christopher Hitchens, Andrew Roberts, Lola Young, Jeremy Isaacs, Geoff Dyer, Jonathan Kaplan, Andrea Levy, Tariq Ramadan, Tariq Modood, Julia Hobsbawm, Bryan Appleyard, Joan Bakewell, Tim Harford, Lewis Wolpert, Geoff Mulgan, Philip Ball, Carmen Callil, Lesley Chamberlain, Geoff Mulgan, Chris Smith, Eric Sykes, Roy Hattersley, James Lovelock, Charles Handy, Pankaj Mishra, Paul Rusesabagina, Sebastian Junger, and Margaret Atwood

=== 2007 ===
The 2007 festival, held 9–30 May, sought to explore "questions on the arts, Englishness, happiness and affluence, Africa, big business, spirituality, crime and justice, science and peace." Speakers included Wole Soyinka, Steve Fuller, Clive Stafford Smith, Steve Bell, John Tusa, Billy Bragg, Graham Swift, Oliver James, William Dalrymple, Paddy Ashdown, Nick Cohen, Jasper Fforde, Ziauddin Sardar, David Edgerton, and Kiran Desai. The Festival also ran a short autumn season of lectures, with Steven Pinker, A. C. Grayling, and Martin Bell. The Festival cancelled an appearance by Nobel Prize-winning scientist James Watson after controversy about his statements on race.

=== 2008 ===
The 2008 spring festival, 3–29 May, aimed to address "many issues including schisms in the Christian Church, the impact of globalisation, science today... fair trade and transition to a greener society, changing America, the media and truth, and what the world would be like without human beings." Speakers included John Cornwell, Julian Baggini, Alan Sokal, Harriet Lamb, Astrid Proll, Andrew Anthony, Sheila Rowbotham, Dominic Sandbrook, Peter Tatchell, Raymond Tallis, Charles Leadbeater, George Ferguson, Jon Ronson, Jean Moorcroft Wilson, Adrian Tinniswood, Andrew Mawson, Ben Macintyre, Gerry Anderson, Susan Greenfield, Nick Davies, Simon Singh, Edzard Ernst, Patrick Cockburn, Philippe Sands, Matt Frei, Naomi Klein, Alan Weisman, Kate Mosse, Gary Marcus, and John Bolton.

A series of special events were held in autumn 2008, featuring Alaa Al Aswany, Tariq Ali, Deyan Sudjic, Richard Evans, Kate Adie, Niall Ferguson, Chris Patten, Colin Blakemore, Jonathan Miller, Richard Gregory, Robert Winston, A. S. Byatt, Semir Zeki, Richard Wentworth and Paul Nurse. Other speakers during the year included John Prescott, Muhammad Yunus, and Tony Benn.

=== 2009 ===
The 2009 festival focused on three themes – Thirty years of Thatcherism; Darwin and Darwinism; and Arts and Science, fifty years after scientist C. P. Snow's influential lecture, The Two Cultures. Events during the main Festival featured speakers Aravind Adiga, Tariq Modood, Peter Singer, James Lovelock, A. C. Grayling, Christopher Caldwell, John Gray, Richard Holmes, Paddy Ashdown, Nick Cohen, Wayne Hemingway, Susan Blackmore, Christopher Brookmyre, James Harkin, Tariq Ramadan, David Aaronovitch, Bruce Hood, Geoff Dyer, Tristram Hunt, Marcus du Sautoy, Ben Goldacre, Ruth Padel, Richard Fortey, and Gillian Beer. A programme of events was also held throughout the rest of year. Speakers included Clay Shirky, Michael Shermer, Ken Robinson, Leonard Susskind, Steve Jones, Misha Glenny, Daniel Dennett, John Armstrong, Chris Anderson, Edward de Bono, Karen Armstrong, Amartya Sen, Margaret Atwood, Richard Dawkins, Sarah Dunant, John Kampfner, Hugh Fearnley-Whittingstall, Simon Schama, Tristram Stuart, Rose George, Zac Goldsmith, Gillian Tett, Neal Lawson, Michael Mansfield, Vic Reeves, Shappi Khorsandi, Alan Davies, Bruce Hood, John Micklethwait, Madeleine Bunting, David Attenborough, David Puttnam, William Waldegrave, Raj Patel, Vince Cable, Virginia Ironside, and Suzanne Moore.

In January 2009, the Festival commissioned an artwork to depict people and products that made Bristol famous, as an updated version of a 1930 painting by Ernest Board (1877–1934), Some Who Have Made Bristol Famous, displayed in the Bristol City Museum and Art Gallery. The commission was won by Simon Gurr, and a final list of subjects to appear in the updated version was agreed in 2010. They include Wallace and Gromit; a special Festival event was held in December 2009, chaired by Christopher Frayling, to mark the 20th anniversary of the creation of the characters by Aardman Animations, based in Bristol.

=== 2010 ===
In 2010, special themes included paranoia, inequality, and animal rights, together with "The Bristol Phenomenon", looking at creativity in Bristol through time. Speakers included Barbara Ehrenreich, Stewart Brand, Brian Eno, Albie Sachs, Rebecca Goldstein, Steven Pinker, Germaine Greer, Paul Davies, Phillip Blond, Peter Singer, Christopher Frayling, John Boorman, Will Hutton, Richard Wilkinson, Paul Collier, Norman Stone, Wendy Grossman, Simon Hoggart, Peter Hitchens, Ben Shephard, Ben Goldacre, Francis Wheen, Richard Holloway, Andrea Levy, Mike Hodges, Melvyn Bragg, Dorothy Rowe, David Eagleman, Anthony Julius, John O'Farrell, Antonia Fraser, Brooke Magnanti, Gary Younge, Christopher Hitchens, Annie Leonard, Barbara Ehrenreich, Bernhard Schlink, and Will Self.

=== 2011 ===
Programmed speakers in the first part of the year included Jimmy Wales and Evgeny Morozov. The main Festival of Ideas took place 13–22 May 2011.

In subsequent years, the festival has featured such American media figures as former National Public Radio reporter Sarah Chayes discussing corruption and historian Thomas Frank speaking on the history of populism.

== Winners of the Bristol Festival of Ideas Book Prize ==
- 2009: Flat Earth News, by Nick Davies
- 2010: The Spirit Level, by Richard Wilkinson and Kate Pickett
- 2011: The Return of the Public, Dan Hind
