= It's 2059, and the Rich Kids are Still Winning =

2019 short story by Ted Chiang

- Short story by Ted Chiang
- Language: English
- Genre: Science fiction

Publication
- Published in: The New York Times
- Publication type: Newspaper
- Publication date: May 27, 2019

"It's 2059, and the Rich Kids are Still Winning" is a science fiction short story by American writer Ted Chiang, initially published on May 27, 2019, by The New York Times, as the first installment in a new series, "Op-Eds from the Future".

== Plot summary ==
In the future, scientists conduct an experiment to genetically modify poor children to improve their intelligence, so they have a better chance to succeed in life. While the experiment proves to be successful, and the children's IQ increases, they still fail to achieve social progress, because the entire state system favors the rich only.

== Awards ==
In 2020, the story was a finalist of the Locus Poll Award as Best Short Story.

== See also ==
- Inequality for All, a 2013 documentary film directed by Jacob Kornbluth and narrated by Robert Reich
- The Spirit Level: Why More Equal Societies Almost Always Do Better, a 2009 book by Richard G. Wilkinson and Kate Pickett
