= Organised crime in Indonesia =

Indonesian organised crime
- Territory: Indonesia
- Ethnicity: Indonesians
- Activities: drug trafficking, human trafficking, cybercrime, scam, illegal logging
- Allies: Ang Soon Tong, Sio Sam Ong, Wah Kee

Organised crime in Indonesia refers to planned crimes in Indonesia that could be perpetrated by either a political party or Indonesian gangs, also referred to as preman. The illegal activities may include corruption, cybercrime, money laundering, violence, felonies, extortion, racketeering and drug trafficking.

== Corruption ==
As of February 2025, the most recent (2023) Corruption Perceptions Index (CPI) ranked Indonesia as the joint-115th least corrupt country (out of 180 countries in total) based upon perceived levels of public sector corruption, with the joint ranking, shared with Ecuador, Malawi, Philippines, Sri Lanka and Turkey). Based on CPI-criteria, Indonesia's calculated country score for 2023 was 34 out of a maximum of 100 points, with higher scores indicative of less public sector corruption. The score of 34/100 in 2023 was unchanged from the previous CPI in 2022. As measured by the CPI, over the past decade (2013-2023), Indonesia's country score has ranged from a low of 32/100 (in 2013) to a high of 40/100 (in 2019).

In terms of the history of modern Indonesia, Suharto, as the 2nd President of Indonesia, ruled the country for 31 years from 1967 to 1998. Suharto, who was variously described as a military dictator by international observers, ruled Indonesia under an authoritarian regime until his resignation in 1998 following nationwide unrest. His 31-year rule over Indonesia is considered one of the most controversial in the 20th century: due to allegations of corruption and his government's central role to the perpetration of mass killings against communists early in his rule and subsequent discrimination of ethnic Chinese Indonesians, irreligious people, and trade unionists.

Under Suharto, the Indonesian economy experienced lopsided growth, as people around him grew richer and the poor became poorer. This widening income inequality infuriated the citizens. In the Year 2000, Suharto faced trial for both corruption and human rights violation. However, his lawyers claimed that he suffered brain damage and he was excused from attending trial. Investigations into allegations of corruption against Indonesian former president/dictator Suharto began immediately after his 31-year rule. In Global Transparency Report, made by Transparency International in 2004, he was ranked as the world's most corrupt leader. The report accused Suharto of causing losses of US$15–35 billion for the Indonesian government.

In 2007, Indonesia received its worst corruption rank in the decade since the fall of Suharto in 1998, during the reign of president Susilo Bambang Yudhoyono; however corruption, as measured by the CPI, had seen improvements by the end of 2018, with the country ranked at 97 by the end of 2018. Indonesia's corruption rank improved during the reign of the seventh president, Joko Widodo. During this administration, corrupt entities still managed to evade authorities despite many efforts. A major controversy arose from a corruption case involving Setya Novanto. Novanto was linked to a multi-million dollar corruption case involving electronic identity cards, costing Indonesia $170 million in state losses. Novanto disappeared at the time of his scheduled arrest for corruption. He was later found in an emergency room after an apparent car crash. Novanto was eventually convicted in April 2018 for corruption and sentenced to 15 years in jail.

== Cybercrime ==
Media piracy is common in Indonesia. Pirated DVDs and CDs are sold at incredibly cheap prices, ranging between Rp 8000 to Rp 10000, as opposed to market prices ranging from Rp 50000 to Rp 200000. The cheaper costs appeal to lower and middle class buyers, the country stands to lose about 6 trillion rupiah per year. Since disks are easily recycled, sellers may be encouraged to make more pirated disks. These pirated disks are often found in basements of shopping centers in Jakarta and other cities.

Illegal streaming sites contribute heavily to cyber crime in Indonesia. There was a major decrease in illegal sites in the music industry in 2017, after two-thirds of related sites were taken down towards the end of the year. These sites often create new websites meant to share content. Some experts suggest that taking down these sites will eventually close many of these operations down, claiming that there will be less viewers and lower revenue.

== Violent crime ==
In 2016, Jakarta alone had 61 murders, 59 rapes, 1,596 aggravated assaults, 26 burglaries, 637 thefts, and 2,914 vehicle thefts. The crime rate for pick pocketing and credit card scamming in Indonesia is also high, which could be a result of income inequality between different segments of the population. Block M and Glodok, areas in South and North Jakarta respectively, are known for high rates of criminal activity, sometimes attributed to local bars and clubs. Drug-dealing and prostitution are often attributed to these areas. Teen gangs are also sowing terror in the streets, especially in Yogyakarta.

=== Homicide ===
There were 0.5 cases per 100,000 people for homicide rates in Indonesia in 2014, a number that fell drastically from one case per 100,000 people in 2000. Indonesia still has one of the higher crime rates, often attributed to major poverty and income disparity. The author of The Spirit Level, Richard Wilkinson, who is also the co-founder of Equality Trust, argued that over 60 papers have stated that greater income inequality results in higher homicide rates. Poorer neighborhoods in the city are typically regarded as being much more dangerous. Tensions between different groups of people in the country could also be a factor, as sources state that people could end a life just because the other looked at them in a condescending manner.

One example of a famous homicide case in Indonesia was the murder of an eight-year old named Angeline in Bali. She was found dead in her back yard in Bali in June 2015, after her family announced her disappearance on social media. The main suspect in this murder was her adoptive mother, Magriet Megawe, who was later convicted and found guilty. There was ample evidence that she had been mentally and physically abusing Angeline for a long time.

Another case of homicide that occurred in Indonesia was the rape and murder of Enno Farihah, who was a factory worker. She was found dead in Tangerang in her boarding house, with a hoe handle impaled into her genitalia. The three suspects included her boyfriend and two others, with whom she refused to have sex due to the fear of getting pregnant.

One homicide case that received major news coverage even outside of Indonesia was the murder of Mirna Salihin. She was believed to have died as a result of coffee that had been spiked with cyanide. The main suspect was her friend, Jessica Kumala Wongso, who was believed to have been furious with Mirna for being in what Jessica described as a "troublesome relationship". She was later found guilty and sentenced to 20 years in prison.

=== Terrorism ===
One of the earliest major terrorist attacks in Indonesia occurred in 2002 with the Bali bombings. On 14 January 2016, there were seven suicide bombings and a string of gunfights in Jakarta, all believed to have been coordinated by the Islamic State (ISIS). Seven people died in this series of attacks including a police officer, a foreign national, and five bombers. About 17 people were wounded and it took security forces three hours to end the terror that happened near the Starbucks café in Sarinah. Aman Abdurahman was convicted for this attack. The latter Surabaya bombings were believed by some to be retaliation for this conviction.

On 13–14 May 2018, a terrorist attack was organized by a family over two consecutive days, in the small town of Surabaya during the Surabaya bombing. This event triggered another terrorist attempt that occurred two days later in Pekanbaru, Riau, as four men attempted to attack a police station in Sumatra. This attempt to terrorize the police station resulted in deaths and injuries of some police officers and journalists. Since these attacks happened within a week, police conducted a search for suspects using children as suicide bombers.

== Drug trafficking ==
Indonesian borders lack security and people easily cross over with drugs, natural resources, and migrants. Cannabis usage and supplies in Indonesia have increased over these past few years, accompanied by a recent increase in other drugs such as crystal meth and ecstasy, which has caused a surge in HIV infections due to needle-sharing. Indonesia also acts as a drug port, often sending supplies to-and-from Europe and other parts of Asia. Many international criminal organizations also operate within the country.

West African, Chinese, European, and Iranian groups ship drugs in and out of Indonesia through organised crime groups that run the illegal drug industry in Indonesia. The most mass-produced drug in Indonesia run by organised crime groups is methamphetamine, also known as shabu.

Drug trafficking incidents gained major coverage with the Bali Nine, who were 9 Australians that attempted to smuggle drugs from Indonesia back to Australia. There are many cases of drug trafficking to Bali, including one case where an Australian man tried to smuggle ecstasy and amphetamines across the Indonesian border.

Drug laws In Indonesia follow the nation's constitution no.35, year 2009. The constitution divides narcotics into 3 subgroups. Group one consists of marijuana, meth, cocaine, opium, and more; group two consists of morphine and its sub-types; group three consists of codeine and its sub-types. Group one drugs are classified as being the most addictive and can be the riskiest to possess, as possession may lead to a life time in prison and trafficking may lead to death penalties. Group 2 drugs are classified as being useful for therapeutic purposes but are highly addictive; possession may lead to fines up to 8 billion rupiah and life imprisonment, and trafficking may lead to fine up to 10 billion rupiah and death sentence. Group 3 drugs are seen as highly effective for therapeutic purposes and are moderately addictive; possession may lead up to 10 years of imprisonment and trafficking may lead to 15 years in prison.

The nation's constitution stated above also allows underage children (17 years and below) to be sentenced to rehabilitation instead of being treated like an adult in prisons. Appeal for rehabilitation is submitted to the Supreme Court. But if rejected, instead of life imprisonment, the accused drug dealers may end up on the death row; therefore, making this appeal less than ideal. However, many drug smugglers show reformation in prison, thus managing to get off death penalty and leading politicians to be more lenient in giving out death sentences.

== Human trafficking ==
Human trafficking is a huge issue in Indonesia, and often affects the lower-income population. Men, women, and children are forced into labor or sex related trafficking and Indonesia has been serving as the destination and transit country for these illegal acts over the past 5 years. It is thought that there are around 1.9 million Indonesians working abroad, namely Tenaga Kerja Indonesia (TKI), with expired visas. This makes them more vulnerable to human trafficking. Forced-labor Indonesians also receive no incentives as their contracts are often fake and are never fulfilled. When caught for immigration violation, these workers often go to jail despite the company often being to blame.

Many children in Indonesia are forced into child labor, with low wages and overtime work, while women and girls are forced into sex trafficking abroad, in places like Malaysia, Taiwan, and the Middle East. In some cases, fishermen go unpaid and are often physically abused by their employers.

In 2016, there were an estimated 56,000 underage children who were victims of sex trafficking, with a higher ratio of boys than girls being involved. According to one report, half the population of sexually exploited women suffer from sexually transmitted diseases due to commercial and forced sexual intercourse.

In labor exploitation, victims suffer psychological, physical, and sexual abuse, including deprivation of daily necessities such as food and water, ideological pressure, and forced consumption of alcohol and narcotics. People who escape human trafficking require specialized support including therapy, as they may develop trust issues, hatred for others, self-hatred, post-traumatic stress, depression, self-harm, and many other problems.

== See also ==
- Crime in Indonesia
