= We Have Always Lived in the Castle =

1962 novel by Shirley Jackson

- North American first edition cover
- Author: Shirley Jackson
- Language: English
- Genre: Mystery; Thriller; Gothic
- Publisher: Viking Press
- Publication date: September 21, 1962
- Publication place: North America
- Media type: Print (Hardcover, Paperback)
- Pages: 214 (hardcover); 173 (paperback)
- ISBN: 0143039970
- OCLC: 285311

We Have Always Lived in the Castle is a 1962 psychological horror novel by American author Shirley Jackson. It was Jackson's final novel and was published with a dedication to publisher Pascal Covici three years before the author's death in 1965. The novel is written in the voice of eighteen-year-old Mary Katherine "Merricat" Blackwood, who lives with her agoraphobic sister and ailing uncle on an estate. Six years before the events of the novel, the Blackwood family experienced a tragedy that left the three survivors isolated from their small village.

The novel was first published in hardcover in North America by Viking Press, and has since been released in paperback and as an audiobook and e-book. It has been described as Jackson's masterpiece. Its first screen adaptation appeared in 2018, based on a screenplay by Mark Kruger and directed by Stacie Passon.

== Plot ==
Mary Katherine "Merricat" Blackwood lives with her older sister Constance and their ailing Uncle Julian in a large house on extensive grounds, in isolation from the nearby village. Constance has not left their home in six years, going no further than her large garden. Uncle Julian, who uses a wheelchair, obsessively writes and re-writes notes for his memoirs, while Constance takes care of him.

Six years prior, Constance and Merricat's parents John and Lucy, their aunt Dorothy, and their younger brother Thomas died after being poisoned with arsenic, which was mixed into the family's sugar bowl and sprinkled onto blackberries at dinner. Julian was also poisoned, but survived. Merricat was not present at the time, as she had been sent to bed without dinner as punishment. Constance, the only person at the table who didn't put sugar on her berries, was arrested and charged with murder, but was acquitted. The people of the village believe that Constance got away with murder, leading them to ostracize the family.

The three remaining Blackwoods have since grown accustomed to their isolation, leading a quiet, happy existence. Merricat is the family's sole contact with the outside world. She walks into the village twice a week and carries home groceries and library books. On these trips, she is faced directly with the hostility of the villagers, and often taunted by groups of children with an accusing rhyme about the poisoned sugar. Merricat is protective of her sister and practices sympathetic magic that she believes maintains borders around the house.

Merricat feels that a dangerous change is approaching, but before she can warn Constance, their estranged cousin Charles appears for a visit and is welcomed into the home. Charles begins to get close to Constance and gain her confidence. Charles is aware of Merricat's hostility and is increasingly rude to her and impatient of Julian's weaknesses. He makes many references to the money the sisters keep locked in their father's safe, and gradually forms something of an alliance with Constance, encouraging her to leave her home. Merricat perceives Charles as a threat and tries various magical and otherwise disruptive means to drive him from the house. Uncle Julian is increasingly disgusted by Charles and suspects that Charles came there for the Blackwoods' fortune.

One night before dinner, when Constance sends Merricat upstairs to wash her hands, Merricat, in a fit of anger, pushes Charles' smoking pipe into a wastebasket filled with newspapers. This causes a massive fire that consumes the upper floor of the family home. The villagers arrive and help put out the fire, but then finally unleash their long-repressed hostility toward the Blackwoods by vandalizing and ransacking the house. Driven outdoors, Merricat and Constance flee into the woods after being threatened by the villagers, while Julian dies of apparent heart failure during the fire and Charles attempts to take the family safe. That night, Merricat and Constance shelter under a tree that Merricat has made into a hideaway. The next day, Constance confesses that she always knew that Merricat was the one who poisoned the family. Merricat readily admits to the deed, saying that she put the poison in the sugar bowl because she knew that Constance would not take sugar.

Upon returning to their ruined home, Constance and Merricat proceed to salvage what is left of their belongings, close off the rooms too damaged to use, and start their lives anew in the little space left to them. The house, now without a roof, resembles a castle "turreted and open to the sky." Constance and Merricat spend much of their time watching the outside world through peepholes hidden by vines that grow to cover the house. The villagers, feeling remorse at their actions, begin to leave food on their doorstep, while developing stories about the house akin to folklore. Charles, accompanied by a journalist, returns once to try to renew his acquaintance with Constance, but she ignores him. The sisters choose to remain alone and unseen by the rest of the world.

== Characters ==
Mary Katherine "Merricat" Blackwood
18-year-old Merricat is the youngest surviving member of the Blackwood family and the narrator of the novel. When she was twelve, her parents, aunt and younger brother died after being poisoned at dinner. Merricat is the only Blackwood who ventures into town to collect library books and buy groceries. While carrying out these errands, she is often harassed by the townspeople. Merricat practices sympathetic magic, burying relics and nailing items to trees in order to keep her family out of harm's way. She has a close companionship with the family cat, Jonas. Merricat mistrusts Charles and suspects him of plotting to steal from the family and using the villagers to attack them. During a conversation with Constance while hiding away from the villagers, Merricat admits to poisoning the sugar bowl, revealing herself to be the true murderer.
Constance Blackwood
Merricat's 28-year-old agoraphobic sister has not ventured farther than the Blackwoods' large garden since her family perished. Constance was the one who was arrested for the murder, though she was later acquitted of the crime. However, she is still blamed for it by the local townspeople. Although Charles gains her trust, she eventually sees him for the greedy and selfish person he is.
Julian Blackwood
Merricat and Constance's uncle is the brother of their late father, John. Julian was poisoned with arsenic along with his family but survived, and now uses a wheelchair. He lost his wife, Dorothy, in the incident. Julian, described by other characters as "eccentric", obsessively writes about the poisoning over and over for his memoirs, but is frequently confused about his surroundings and what he remembers. Constance, his eldest niece, looks after him, and neither has left the family's estate in six years.
Charles Blackwood
Merricat and Constance's cousin and Julian's nephew is the son of Arthur, John and Julian's brother. After his father's death, Charles arrives at the Blackwood residence for a visit, but this is questioned by Merricat and Julian, neither of whom trust him. Julian suspects that he wants to steal the family's fortune. Charles begins to form a close relationship with Constance and takes advantage of her naïveté.

== Themes ==
The theme of persecution of people who exhibit "otherness" or become outsiders in small-town New England, by small-minded villagers, is at the forefront of We Have Always Lived in the Castle and is a repeated theme in Jackson's work. In her novels The Haunting of Hill House and, to a lesser extent, The Sundial, this theme is also central to the psychology of the story. In all these works, the main characters live in a house that stands alone on many acres, and is entirely separate physically, socially, as well as ideologically, from the main inhabitants of the town. In his 2006 introduction of the Penguin Classics edition, Jonathan Lethem stated that the recurring town is "pretty well recognizable as North Bennington, Vermont", where Jackson and her husband, Bennington professor Stanley Edgar Hyman, encountered strong "reflexive anti-Semitism and anti-intellectualism".

All of Jackson's work creates an atmosphere of strangeness and contact with what Lethem calls "a vast intimacy with everyday evil..." and how that intimacy affects "a village, a family, a self". Only in We Have Always Lived in the Castle, though, is there also a deep exploration of love and devotion despite the pervasive unease and perversity of character that runs through the story. Constance's complete absence of judgment of her sister and her crime is treated as absolutely normal and unremarkable, and it is clear throughout the story that Merricat loves and cares deeply for her sister.

The novel was described by Jackson's biographer, Judy Oppenheimer, as "a paean to agoraphobia", with the author's own agoraphobia and nervous conditions having greatly informed its psychology. Jackson freely admitted that the two young women in the story were liberally fictionalized versions of her own daughters, and Oppenheimer noted that Merricat and Constance were the "yin and yang of Shirley's own inner self". Written in deceptively simple language, by an entirely unreliable narrator, the novel implies that the two heroines may choose to live forever in the remaining three rooms of their house, since they prefer each other's company to that of any outsiders. Lethem calls this reversion to their pre-Charles stasis Merricat's "triumph".

== Critical reception ==
We Have Always Lived in the Castle was named by Time magazine as one of the "Ten Best Novels" of 1962.

In March 2002, Book magazine named Mary Katherine Blackwood the seventy-first "best character in fiction since 1900".

The lead paragraph of We Have Always Lived in the Castle has been described as "coercive," so much so that the reader finds it "impossible not to go on reading".

== Adaptations ==
In 1966, the novel was adapted into a stage play by Hugh Wheeler, starring Heather Menzies, Shirley Knight, and Alan Webb. The play premiered at the Ethel Barrymore Theatre on Broadway on October 19, and closed after 11 performances on October 26. In 2010, Adam Bock and Todd Almond staged a musical version at the Yale Repertory Theatre in New Haven, Connecticut, which ran from September 23 to October 9.

In August 2009, the novel was optioned for the screen by Michael Douglas' production company Further Films, from a script written by Mark Kruger, with the support of Jackson's son Laurence Hyman. The film adaptation, from Further Films and Albyn Media, was filmed in Bray and Dublin, Ireland from August to September 2016. Directed by Stacie Passon, it stars Taissa Farmiga as Merricat, Alexandra Daddario as Constance, Crispin Glover as Uncle Julian, and Sebastian Stan as Charles. The film premiered at the LA Film Festival on September 22, 2018, and on May 17, 2019, was released by Brainstorm Media.
