= Michael Hudson (economist) =

American economist

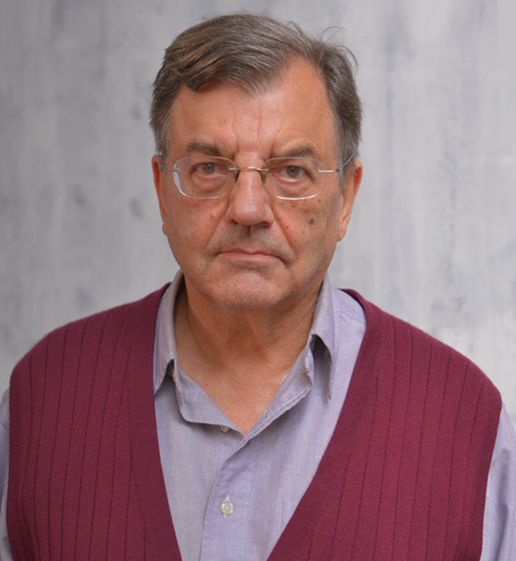
- Hudson in 2016
- Born: March 14, 1939 (age 87); Minneapolis, Minnesota, United States
- Years active: 1972–present

Academic background
- Education: University of Chicago (BA); New York University (MA, PhD)

Academic work
- School or tradition: Classical economics
- Institutions: University of Missouri–Kansas City
- Website: michael-hudson.com

Michael Hudson (born March 14, 1939) is an American economist who is Professor of Economics at the University of Missouri–Kansas City and a researcher at the Levy Economics Institute at Bard College. He is a contributor to The Hudson Report, a weekly economic and financial news podcast produced by Left Out.

Hudson graduated from the University of Chicago (BA, 1959) and New York University (MA, 1965, PhD, 1968) and worked as a balance of payments economist in Chase Manhattan Bank (1964–68). He was assistant professor of economics at the New School for Social Research (1969–72) and worked for various governmental and non-governmental organizations as an economic consultant (1980s–1990s).

== Biography ==
=== Early life and education ===
Hudson was born on March 14, 1939, in Minneapolis. His father, Nathaniel Carlos Hudson (1908–2003), received an MBA from the University of Minnesota in 1929. His father joined the trade union struggle, became an active Trotskyist trade unionist, editor of the Northwest Organizer and The Industrial Organizer, and wrote articles for other trade union publications. When Hudson was three years old, his father was jailed "under the Smith Act for advocating the overthrow of the government through force and violence," according to Hudson. He had been one of the leaders of the Minneapolis general strikes from 1934 to 1936.

Hudson received his primary and secondary education in a private school at the University of Chicago Laboratory Schools. After his graduation, he entered the University of Chicago with two majors: Germanic philology and history. In 1959, Hudson graduated from the University of Chicago with a bachelor's degree. After graduation, he worked as an assistant to Jeremy Kaplan at the Free Press in Chicago. He managed to obtain the rights to the English language editions of the works of György Lukács as well as the rights to the archives and works of Leon Trotsky after the death of Trotsky's widow, Natalia Sedova.

Hudson found work at the publishing house neither interesting nor profitable. Hudson, who had studied music from his childhood, moved to New York in 1960 in hopes of becoming a pupil of the conductor Dimitris Mitropoulos, but these plans were not to be realized.

=== Study of economics and working at banks ===
Hudson's childhood best friend was Gavin MacFadyen, later a documentary film maker, founder in London of the Centre for Investigative Journalism and director of WikiLeaks. MacFadyen had introduced Hudson to Terence McCarthy who was an Irish communist and was the translator of Marx's Theories of Surplus Value. McCarthy became his mentor.

In 1961, Hudson enrolled in the Economics Department of New York University. His master's thesis was devoted to the development philosophy of the World Bank with special attention to credit policy in the agricultural sector. In 1964, after Hudson received his master's degree in economics, he joined Chase Manhattan Bank's economics research department as a balance of payments specialist.

Hudson left his job at the bank to complete his doctoral dissertation. His thesis was about US economic and technological thought in the 19th century. He defended it in 1968 and in 1975 published it under the title Economics and Technology in 19th Century American Thought: The Neglected American Economists.

=== Career ===
In 1968, Hudson joined the accounting firm Arthur Andersen. In 1972, Hudson moved to the Hudson Institute headed by Herman Kahn. In 1979, he became an advisor to the United Nations Institute for Training and Research (UNITAR).

In the mid-1990s, Hudson became a professor of economics at the University of Missouri–Kansas City and a fellow at the Levy Economics Institute at Bard College. As of 2020, Hudson was the director of the Institute for the Study of Long-Term economic Trends (ISLET) and the Distinguished Research Professor of Economics at the University of Missouri–Kansas City.

== Works ==
=== Books ===
Hudson is the author of several books, among them the following:

- Super Imperialism: The Economic Strategy of American Empire (1968, with 2003 and 2021 edition revisions.)
- Global Fracture: The New International Economic order (1973), a sequel to Super Imperialism.
- Trade, Development and Foreign Debt, Volume I, International Trade: A History of Theories of Polarisation and Convergence in the International Economy (1992).
- Trade, Development and Foreign Debt, Volume II, International Finance: A History of Theories of Polarisation and Convergence in the International Economy (1992).
- A philosophy for a fair society (Georgist Paradigm Series) (1994).
- Urbanization and Land Ownership in the Ancient Near East (1999), edited by Hudson and Baruch A. Levine, with an introduction by Hudson, Volume II in a series sponsored by the Institute for the Study of Long-term Economic Trends and the International Scholars Conference on Ancient Near East Economies: A Colloquium Held at New York University, November 1996 and The Oriental Institute, St. Petersburg, Russia, May 1997, published by Peabody Museum of Archaeology and Ethnology.
- Super Imperialism Walter E. Williams New Edition: The Origin and Fundamentals of U.S. World Dominance (2003),
- Global Fracture: The New International Economic order, Second Edition,
- America's Protectionist Takeoff, 1815-1914: The Neglected American School of Political Economy (2010), enlarged, revised and updated version of Economics and Technology in 19th-Century American Thought - The Neglected American Economists.
- The Bubble and Beyond (2012)
- Killing the Host (2015)
- J is For Junk Economics: A Guide to Reality in an Age of Deception (2017)
- ... and forgive them their debts: Lending, Foreclosure and Redemption – From Bronze Age Finance to the Jubilee Year (2018), Dresden: ISLET-Verlag Dresden. [ISBN 978-3-9818260-3-6] (hard bound), [ISBN 978-3-9818260-2-9] (soft cover)
- The Destiny of Civilization: Finance Capitalism, Industrial Capitalism or Socialism (2022)
- The Collapse of Antiquity: Greece and Rome as Civilization's Oligarchic Turning Point (2023)
- Temples of Enterprise: Creating Economic Order in the Bronze Age Near East (2024)

=== Documentaries ===
Hudson has appeared in several documentaries, including the following:

- The Spider's Web: Britain's Second Empire (2017), by Michael Oswald
- Capitalism (2015), by Ilan Ziv
- Real Estate 4 Ransom (2012), by Grant Kot
- Four Horsemen (2012), by Ross Ashcroft
- Surviving Progress (2011), by Mathieu Roy and Harold Crooks
- The Secret of Oz: Solutions for a broken Economy (2009), by William Still
- Plunder: The Crime of Our Time (2009)
- In Debt We Trust (2006)

== See also ==
- Post-Keynesian economics
