= We Have Always Lived in the Castle (film) =

- Theatrical release poster
- Directed by: Stacie Passon
- Screenplay by: Mark Kruger
- Based on: We Have Always Lived in the Castle by Shirley Jackson
- Produced by: Jared Ian Goldman; Robert Mitas; Kieran Corrigan
- Starring: Taissa Farmiga; Alexandra Daddario; Crispin Glover; Sebastian Stan
- Cinematography: Piers McGrail
- Edited by: Ryan Denmark
- Music by: Andrew Hewitt
- Production companies: Furthur Films; Mighty Engine; Albyn Media
- Distributed by: Brainstorm Media
- Release dates: September 22, 2018 (LAFF); May 17, 2019 (United States)
- Running time: 96 minutes
- Country: United States
- Language: English

We Have Always Lived in the Castle is a 2018 American fantasy thriller film directed by Stacie Passon, written by Mark Kruger, and starring Taissa Farmiga, Alexandra Daddario, Crispin Glover, and Sebastian Stan. It was based on the 1962 novel of the same name by Shirley Jackson.

It premiered at the LA Film Festival on September 22, 2018, to generally favorable reviews. It was released on May 17, 2019 by Brainstorm Media.

== Plot ==
18-year-old Mary Katherine "Merricat" Blackwood lives on the family estate with her older sister Constance and their ailing uncle Julian. Constance has not left the house in the six years since she was tried and acquitted of the death of her parents by poisoning. Every Tuesday, Merricat goes to the village to shop while the villagers harass her. Merricat practices her own brand of protective magic by burying articles of power in the ground to keep evil forces at bay and protect Constance.

Constance sees only a single family friend, Helen Clarke, who comes to tea every week. Helen tries to convince Constance that she should rejoin the outside world. This enrages and terrifies Merricat, who creates magic to prevent Constance from leaving. On Thursday, Constance sends Merricat on an errand to town. Merricat is distressed at the thought of going into town on the wrong day and has no time to check her magical safeguards. When she returns, she finds all her wards have been unearthed. Before she can warn her sister, she is introduced to their estranged cousin, Charles.

Over the next few days, Charles attempts to lure Constance away with the promise of seeing the world while setting his sights on the family fortune, locked in a safe. Constance is charmed and subservient toward him. However, Charles behaves condescendingly to Julian and taunts Merricat with the idea of stealing her sister. Merricat retaliates by casting magical spells on Charles, vandalizing his room and belongings, and speaking to him only in descriptions of poisonous plants. When Charles threatens to punish her, Merricat throws everything on his desk, including his lit pipe, into a wastebasket. Charles beats her until he discovers that his room is on fire.

The fire department arrives, along with the villagers, who call to let the house burn. Constance and Merricat hide downstairs as the fire is extinguished. The villagers rush into the house and vandalize it. The mob seems ready to attack the sisters, but Helen Clarke's husband announces that Uncle Julian has died of smoke inhalation. The mob disperses, and the sisters take refuge in the woods.

The following morning, the sisters return home and barricade the doors and windows. With the upper floors destroyed, the remains resemble a turreted castle. Merricat announces that she intends to poison the whole village; Constance reveals that this is what Merricat did once before to their parents and expresses gratitude that Merricat saved her from their wicked father. The villagers leave gifts of food at their door and apologize for destroying their property, but the sisters never respond. Charles returns, begging Constance to let him in. When they remain silent, Charles enters the house by force and attacks Constance. Merricat bludgeons him to death with a snow globe, and they bury him in the garden.

In the present, the sisters are cleaning what remains of their house when two village children arrive to taunt them. Merricat steps outside, and the children flee in fear. Constance tells Merricat that she loves her, and Merricat, for the first time in the film, smiles.

== Cast ==
- Taissa Farmiga as Merricat Blackwood
- Alexandra Daddario as Constance Blackwood
- Sebastian Stan as Charles Blackwood
- Crispin Glover as Julian Blackwood
- Paula Malcomson as Helen Clarke
- Peter Coonan as Bobby Dunham
- Ian Toner as Jim Donnell
- Joanne Crawford as Stella
- Anna Nugent as Lucille Wright
- Peter O'Meara as Sam Clarke
- Luan James-Geary as Sean Harris
- Cormac Melia as Tim Harris
- Liz O'Sullivan as Mrs. Harris
- Bosco Hogan as Old Ned
- Stephen Hogan as John Blackwood, Merricat and Constance's father
- Maria Doyle Kennedy as Mrs. Blackwood, Merricat and Constance's mother

== Production ==
=== Development ===
The film, the first screen adaptation of Shirley Jackson's novel of the same name, was originally reported to be in development in August 2009, when Michael Douglas's production company Further Films announced its attachment to the project written by Mark Kruger. Jackson's eldest son, Laurence Hyman, was also reported to be producing in some capacity. In August 2016, Stacie Passon was reported to be directing the film, with Jared Ian Goldman and Robert Mitas producing, and Douglas and Robert Halmi Jr. serving as executive producers.

=== Casting ===
In March 2010, it was revealed that Douglas would star in the film, and Rachel McAdams and Saoirse Ronan were also rumored to be attached. On August 9, 2016, Sebastian Stan's casting as Charles Blackwood was announced. That same day, Taissa Farmiga, Alexandra Daddario, Willem Dafoe, and Joanne Crawford were confirmed to star in the film. Farmiga and Daddario were cast in the main roles of protagonist Merricat Blackwood and her sister Constance Blackwood, respectively. On August 11, 2016, Crispin Glover was cast as Uncle Julian Blackwood, replacing Dafoe in the role. Peter O'Meara joined the cast on August 21, in the supporting role of Sam Clarke.

=== Filming ===
Principal photography began on August 8, 2016 in Bray and Dublin, Republic of Ireland. Farmiga, Stan, and Peter Coonan were spotted on set for the second day of filming in the village of Enniskerry, County Wicklow. Production continued in Dublin, where it concluded on September 9, 2016.

== Music ==
In January 2017, it was reported that Andrew Hewitt would compose the film's score.

== Release ==
The film had its world premiere at the LA Film Festival on September 22, 2018 and was released on May 17, 2019, by Brainstorm Media.

== Reception ==
On review aggregator website Rotten Tomatoes, the film holds an approval rating of 87% based on 31 reviews, with an average rating of 7.2/10. The site's critical consensus reads, "We Have Always Lived in the Castle draws on Shirley Jackson's classic tale to deliver a skillfully crafted mystery that engrosses and unsettles in equal measure." On Metacritic, the film has a weighted average score of 63 out of 100, based on 8 critics, indicating "generally favorable reviews".
