= Preman (Indonesian gangster) =

Indonesian gangster

Indonesian organized crime groups
- Territory: Indonesia
- Ethnicity: Indonesians
- Activities: political corruption, corruption, terrorism, contract killings
- Allies: Front Pembela Islam, Forum Betawi Rempug, Pasukan Manguni Makasiouw, Pancasila Youth

Preman is a term for Indonesian organized crime groups, encompassing street level criminals up through crime bosses. Premans are often perceived negatively throughout Indonesian society due to associations with violence and criminality. This root word is derived from a term which describes the "confluence of state power and criminality". However, organized crime in Indonesia has a more enduring and complicated history, as the confluence of crime syndicates with perceived legitimate political authority has a history extending as far back as the Mataram kingdom. While associated with brigandage and theft, Indonesian crime syndicates have periodically acted as enforcers to maintain authority and order. The roles of the jago or jawara were particularly important during the Indonesian Revolution, as they often adopted political roles that helped consolidating the power of local authorities. Despite their significance to Indonesian history, syndicates are universally marginalized due to associations with violence and social illegitimacy.

== Etymology ==
The word jago literally means a rooster and refers to a type of strongman that exists as a part of the everyday life in urban and rural areas of Indonesia. The jago is a social and political actor in both recent and more distant history of Indonesia. In Indonesian popular culture, the jago is often romanticized as a champion of the people whose acts of violence are motivated by a deep sense of justice, honour and order.

The preman is the modern, diagonally opposite form of the jago. This word originated from the Dutch word vrijman (free man) showing the roots of the social group during the Dutch colonial era; as Loren Ryter states, "the ambiguity of the term is best understood by thinking of the preman as a kind of privateer, an interpretation true to the colonial roots of the term vrijman, or free man. [...] a vrijman was not a freed slave, but rather a non-contract overseer or a coolie day-laborer, thus still in the employ of the company, though not legally bound to it."

== Biographies of notable figures ==
Name	Background
Haji Darip (Boss of Klender)	Born around the 1900s. He was the son of a well-known local jago, Gempur. He received education in Mecca and came back to Klender to join the state railways as a staff. He later became a prominent jago and trader. He was a religious authority believed to possess the power to distribute talismans to confer invulnerability. He was influential in his job: he was involved in the 1923 railway strike and had tight control over traffic on the main road west of Jakarta. He successfully blended brigandage with patriotism. He was known to place mercury into the veins of his favoured followers to grant them invulnerability.
Pa' Macem	A prominent pre-war bandit, he commanded a large band of experienced fighters and was known to sell amulets that offered invulnerability.
Imam Syafe'i (a.k.a. Sape'i/Bang Pe'i)	The Angkatan Pemuda Islam (API) had developed close ties with him. He was one of the most powerful bosses in the Senen market area. His OPI (Oesaha Pemuda Indonesia, Endeavour of the Youth of Indonesia) guarded the major intersection at Senen. And he was also the sponsor of BARA in the countryside.
Panji (Son-in-Law of Haji Darip, Boss of Klender)	Based on a Dutch report before the war, he had been sentenced to 12 years jail for robbery. However, he managed to escape during the Japanese occupation and at the start of the revolution, he had put together an armed band. However, the unit was rather loosely gathered. It consistsed of 300 patriots, toughs and opportunists. His unit was held together with the strength of his personality and magic powers. He was believed to have the capabilities to produce charms that could provide invulnerability to the people
Fadloli el-Muhir (Leader of Betawi Brotherhood Forum (FBR))	A former journalist and former politician in the Soeharto-backed Soejadi wing of the Indonesian Democratic Party (PDI). He was also a member of the Supreme Advisory Council (DPA) His authority within the FBR was mainly derived from the belief in the potency of his supernatural power (ilmu ghaib). He is believed to possess not just the power of invulnerability (ilmu kebal) but is also seen as a divine mandate meant to lead the most disenfranchised of the Betawi community towards a new golden age of prosperity.
Rosario de Marshall (a.k.a. Hercules)	Hercules was an Indonesian Army porter during the Indonesian occupation of East Timor. After moving to Jakarta, he formed his own gang of thugs in the Tanah Abang district, which dominated Jakarta's criminal underworld in the 1990s. Today, Hercules maintains celebrity status as a fearsome gangster, occasionally appearing on TV shows and tabloid magazines. He is also well known for his political ties to 2014 and 2019 presidential candidate Prabowo Subianto.
Muhammad Yusuf Muhi (A.K.A Bang Ucu Kambing)	Muhammad Yusuf Muhi, one of the most respected warriors in Tanah Abang. Another flashy nickname is the Betawi warlord.
John Refra (a.k.a. John Kei)	John Kei has operated a debt collection business through his organization Angkatan Muda Kei (Kei Youth Force, AMKEI). His debt collection ring has become one of the largest gang organizations in Jakarta.
Anton Medan	The nickname Anton Medan was given to a man born in Tebing Tinggi, North Sumatra in 1957. A young man with the real name Tan Hok Liang first carried out acts of thuggery when he was still a teenager.

== History ==
=== Pre-colonial ===
In the traditional state of the Kingdom of Mataram, thuggery was very much part of rural Java. The jago in pre-colonial times gained their legitimacy through their physical strength and sense of justice. In contrast, preman are notorious for their bullying behavior. Due to their image as thugs, the preman in rural Java were very much despised by the locals, while Jago were highly praised as heroes.

=== Colonial period ===
==== Role in Batavian society and to colonial state ====
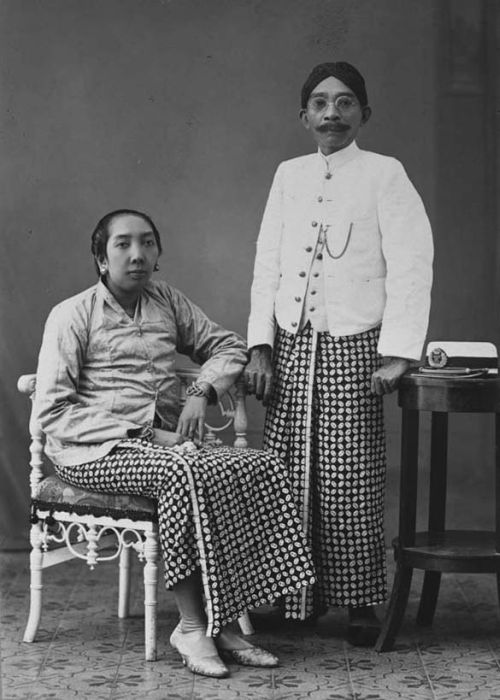
The Javanese priyayi class could not provide an active leadership, the peasantry looked up to the preman as their representatives and protectors from the extortions of the former.

When the Dutch first arrived, their colonization did little to disturb the position of the preman. However, in the 19th century, their role shifted with the advent of a bureaucratically organised government. The differences between the more bureaucratic and legalistic Dutch colonial state and the traditional agrarian Java state that relies heavily on personal relation called for the need of intermediaries or power-brokers. These power-brokers were also referred to as premans who acted as agents between the ruling elite and the peasantry. The preman hence became an integral part of the colonial power structure. Although the colonial administration was based in Batavia, they had little control over the rural heartland of Java. It was through this need for control that the preman became part of the administration. Subsequently, we see the preman getting involved in the fields of taxation corvée, conscription as well as enforcing order. Hence, it can be said that the underworld enjoyed "an almost symbiotic relationship with the forces of law and order". In a society that is based almost entirely upon trade, labour bosses as well as preman enforcers were important to the economic life of the city.

Such needs for the preman to act as intermediaries were further enforced by the egalitarian nature of Javanese society, which was reinforced by the mystical concept of power that prevented outright confrontation between the people in power and the peasantry. The preman, as intermediaries, were important in filling in the ideological gap between cultural ideals and the political realities of the governing society. The different ideals and realities of the peasants' life demanded a more active leadership, though a misleading one, because the priyayi class could not provide.

==== Rebellions against the Dutch ====
Despite their incorporation in the colonial administration, this incorporation was not without disruption. Due to its volatile nature, the preman bands often emerged as sites of rebellion such as in the Banten peasant uprising in 1888. The preman were also seen as a threat to the Dutch authorities due to their status as being "magically invulnerable" against Dutch authority including bullets and sharp weapons. Many of these rebellions and unrest occurring in Jakarta's region had a broadly millenarian character. These rebellions "sought to realize a fundamental, spiritually-based change in the ordering of the world and they looked to a leader with allegedly supernatural characteristics". The preman were also seen as qualified to participate in the rebellions by virtue of their skills. In a colonial regime whereby many of the indigenous population had already been disarmed, the preman were the only ones who possessed the skills to use offensive weapons necessary for a credible revolt.

==== Rising political awareness ====
In the early twentieth century, the increasing effectiveness of Dutch repression had caused frustration amongst the Batavia's underworld. This frustration caused them to gain an interest in the emerging Indonesian nationalist movement. The establishment of Sarekat Islam (Islam Union) in the Batavia Ommelanden in 1913 saw the involvement of Jakarta's underworld. In the organization against the Chinese landlords and their agents, Sarekat Islam acquired its own access of thuggery through the recruitment of local jago. The underworld's political awareness further enhanced by the Indonesian Communist Party (PKI). Through their contacts with the workers and efforts to establish trade unions in Batavia, it brought the PKI into contact with Jakarta's underworld. The local gangs were assets to the PKI as they provided the organizational base that gave its local branches access to networks of support, information and protection. They also provided the PKI with enthusiastic supporters who added to the burning national fervor and will not easily cower under the colonial authorities.

After 1923, with the shifting of the PKI's headquarters from Semarang to Batavia and Tanjung Priok this saw the involvement of Bantenese jagos who were also known as jawara. These gangsters provided the underworld with the means to protect itself from other local jagos as well as against any local officials or Islamic leaders who threaten the position of the PKI. For the gangs, the PKI portrayed itself as an attractive political force that was capable of being a challenger against the Dutch. They were also in need of allies given the increasing repression of the Dutch against them. The Dutch used the Korps Marechaussee and the Veldpolitie (Rural Police) restricted the movements of the Jakarta's underworld. Hence, the jago leaders gained interest in the possibility of increasing their position through supporting possible challengers to the colonial system. This alliance saw the emergence of the anti-colonial movement in 1926 whereby an attack on the jails at Glodok and Cipinang were carried out. However, the attack failed and Dutch repression was effective in crippling the Batavia PKI and in driving the city's gangs back into the underworld. Nevertheless, participation in the revolt had planted a revolutionary consciousness in the gangs. By the late 1930s, the underworld was once again involved in the activities of the Gerindo (Gerakan Rakyat Indonesia, Indonesian People's Movement). The need to keep in touch with the masses made the Jakarta's underworld an attractive partner as they helped in ensuring the popular credentials of the nationalist leaders.

=== Japanese occupation ===
The Japanese occupation of the Dutch East Indies gave the Jakarta underworld opportunities offered by the major political change. Just like the Dutch, the Japanese had no intentions to challenge the position of the underworld. The powerful jagos were still recruited for guerrilla warfare against expected Allied invasions. The gangsters on the other hand, were more than happy to accept the status and implied protection brought by the Japanese.

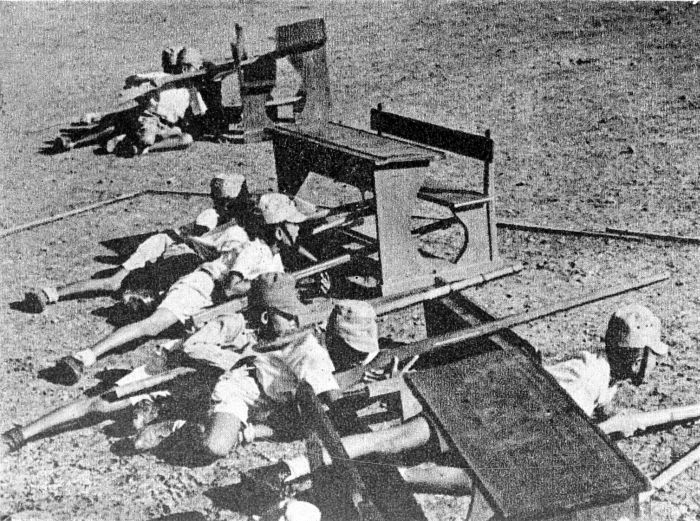
Training programme by the Japanese Army

However, the underworld's position was challenged indirectly by the Japanese's construction of a rival institution in the form of Pembela Tanah Air (PETA). As the PETA was well-armed and trained, they had the potential to challenge the power of the local gangs. The Jakarta underworld however, gained power again when the latter part of the Japanese occupation resulted in economic hardships. The policy of economic autarky imposed by the Japanese had resulted in an inflation of the market price of rice. The local jagos of Karawang and Jakarta, on the other hand, were able to evade these regulations due to their wide networks and connections. Through this situation, they sought to gain profits, which in turn strengthened their political positions.

In addition to that the Japanese occupation also established close relationship between the underworld and the younger generation of nationalists. This became the basis for the subsequent revolutionary coalition in 1945 onwards. Under the Japanese occupation, the alliance between the underworld and the nationalists received its first institutional form. This alliance was based not only on historical experience of cooperation between the two sides but also on their shared antagonism to the Dutch and their complementary skills. The nationalists possessed an analysis, a programme and a broad scope of action which made effective resistance seem more possible while the jagos possessed the organizational base needed by the nationalists for mass mobilization.

=== Revolutionary period ===
The Japanese surrendered on 15 August 1945. Chaos soon ensued as older nationalists and younger nationalists were at odds with one another in deciding on the correct strategy to be taken in the new situation. The latter pressed for a bold declaration of independence. In this period of unrest, a political programme came from the jagos who wanted "a congenial political order". The local breakdown of public order had given the jagos a chance to expand their power bases, but they needed to protect their positions from interlopers who might emerge during the unrest. The jagos gangs who moved into this new power vacuum were those who tied their personal ambitions to the establishment of the Republic. They also adopted the rhetoric and the substance of nationalist demands. A declaration of allegiance to the Republic immediately reinforced a jagos's authority by the power of association. This allegiance also provided the jagos with opportunities to position themselves in the lower levels of government hierarchy in the countryside. Hence, we see many small-time jagos assuming local titles.

The better-established local jagos, however, created their own institutions, which overrides the official hierarchy and allowed them better control of it. These larger jagos included Haji Darip, boss of Klender.

With the declaration of independence and the involvement of the local bosses in the Republican cause, it had defined the enemy and made the distinction between the nationalist jagos and the opportunists. Local jagos like Darip and Macem acquired an image as nationalist gangsters and this allowed them to move into a position of greater power and responsibility. They were also more aware that their fate to stay in power was tied to the Republic. However, these local jagos found difficulties in understanding the nationalist leaders' calls for calm and restraint. Similarly, the young nationalists were also frustrated with the older leaders' caution and hesitancy to propagate direct confrontation. This caused them to go back into the kampungs of Jakarta to re-establish their contacts with the underworld. Through BARA (Barisan Rakyat, People's Brigade), they worked with the local jagos. The local jagos were informed of the aims of the revolution and they were encouraged to enrol their followers as a unit in BARA.

Besides BARA, the Jakarta underworld were also a part of the API (Angkatan Pemuda Indonesia, Youth Generation of Indonesia) constituency. The leaders of the API had personal links to the underworld because of their prior pre-war contacts and the Japanese-sponsored training programme. The local jagos were important as they provided 'ready-made' organizations and access to weapons. Likewise, the local jagos such as Imam Syafe'i from Senen found the API a convenient instrument to further their personal and political ambitions. Both parties appropriated each other for their own benefits as well as to cover up their weaknesses. The formation of the LRJR (Lasykar Rakyat Jakarta Raya, People's Militia of Greater Jakarta) once again saw their collaboration with the local jagos like Haji Darip, Pak Macem and Kyai Haji Nurali who were considered to be considerably patriotic. Local jago, Haji Darip, was considered more attractive as an ally for possessing a consignment of weapons from the East Javanese leader, Dr Moestopo. By mid-1946, the Jakarta underworld had greatly expanded its following through the revolution.

=== Post-Revolution ===
==== Decline of Jakarta's underworld ====
In post-revolution Indonesia, the lasykar's inability to secure a place in the Republican state saw its decline in power. Partly on goals to improve its international standing, the Republican state grew increasingly hostile towards criminal elements in the country. The decline of the lasykars was also partly due to increasingly mutual distrust within the lasykar community on issues of the smuggling trade. Other reasons on their decline was their inability to make themselves useful militarily to the state. As the professionalism of the Indonesian army replaced the usefulness of the lasykar. Eventually, there were increasing tensions and hostility between the Indonesian army and the lasykars.

The distrustful nature and the weak organisation of the jagos hampered cooperation between groups and aided their decline. Their decline was also due to the failures of the local jagos to find new opportunities for lucrative criminal activities such as the trade of illegal drugs or alcohol in the revolutionary environment of Indonesia at the time.

==== HAMOT (Hare Majesteit's Ongeregelde Troepen, Her Majesty's Irregular Troops) ====
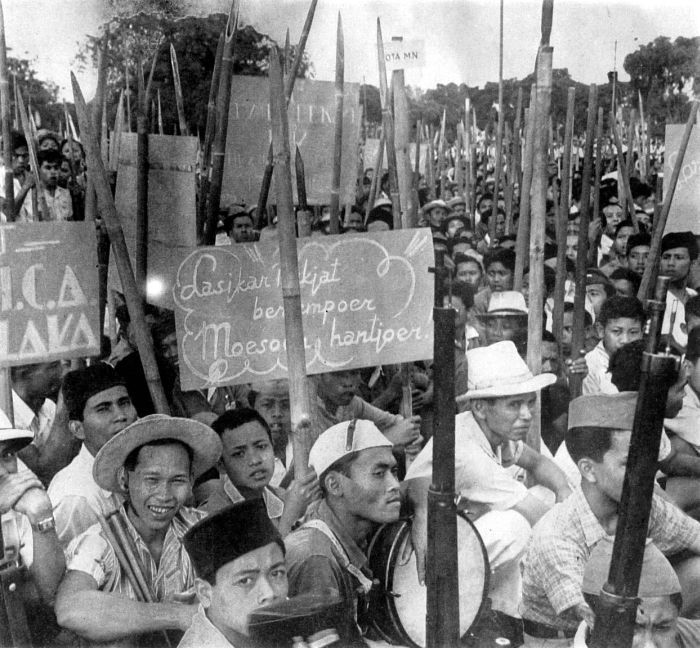
Javanese revolutionaries fighting for independence. They are mostly armed with bamboo spears and the few guns come from the Japanese.

As opportunities within the local government declined, many local bosses turned to the service of the local Dutch. Local bosses such as Panji, Fakhruddin, Harun Umar and Sujono took up service under the Dutch auxiliary force. Under the pressure of the Dutch attacks, Panji, the son-in-law of infamous local boss, Haji Darip, became part of HAMOT (Hare Majesteit's Ongeregelde Troepen, Her Majesty's Irregular Troop). This new unit was an initiative by Lt.-Kol Bavnick as an attempt to use the lasykar for intelligence purposes and as auxiliary soldiers.

Subsequently, the Dutch military continued to take on actions to break up the lasykar. This saw small units of the lasykar who had taken some allegiance to the Bambu Runcing Division through the SP88 to take up the characteristics of pre-war gangs. These small units took up names such as Pasukan Siluman (Ghost Squad), Srigala Hitam (Black Jackal), Pemotong Leher (Neck Cutters) and Garuda Putih (White Eagle). Despite continuous Dutch attempts at eliminating the groups, units such as the SP88 were relatively successful in their psychological warfare against the Dutch. This war of ideas (perang pikiran) was aimed at keeping the Dutch unbalance by constantly changing their names and organisations. They also used the tactic of intimidation by spreading posters bearing the following words:

Those who have become the henchman of the Nica and the Nica-appointed lurahs and their deputies must be killed also those sons of Indonesia who serve in the Dutch forces and the police.
Take care, bung [brother]!
You may have received high positions, you may have been appointed camat or bupati, but you will not feel at ease!
Remember, sons of Indonesia, that the Dutch are your enemies.
Remember, bung!
Once free, always free!!!

— The Tiger of Jakarta, the Broom of the World
Alias, the Thunderbold

This guerrilla warfare, although successful only in preventing the Dutch administration re-establishment n the region, faced the problem of choosing a framework for their struggle. This was further worsened by the hostility from the Republic due to their refusal to evacuate.

The Jakarta's underworld disintegrated after the dissolution of the 17 August Division. Only a few of the lasykar's members continued to survive as they 'returned to society' (kembali ke masyarakat). These survivors either took up their old criminal activities or became engaged in new occupations. While some continued on with a political career, others under the HAMOT had continued on to the part of security battalions under Dutch set up.

=== Post-independence ===
In post-independence Indonesia, premans have more recently attained a new stature in the urban centers. Fractious local politics, inadequate law enforcement, and the driving forces of poverty and unemployment have transformed post-Suharto Indonesia into a "preman's paradise." Premans now can be found in both street corner gangs and in mass organisations with thousands of members whereby their leaders often have close connections with the political elites. They ensured a kind of social order that is centered on the maintenance of a local territorial protection regime.

==== New Order ====
In the New Order period 1966-98, the jago became increasingly known as preman. These new premans had a symbiotic relationship with the elements of the regime. Premans were also associated to political thuggery whereby several youth gangs and local thugs were employed by the military as a part of the bloody anti-communist purges. These premans were also known as gali (gabungan anak liar, gangs of wild children) who became an important part of the repressive strategies pursued by the state. These local premans were employed as provocateurs by figures such as Ali Murtopo, the head of Special Operations (Operasi Khusus, Opsus) during the Malari riots in Jakarta. Similar to their situation during the revolution, this period had brought profound benefits to the premans by making use of the disorder of the 'new order' to their advantage. Subsequently, these gangs were disbanded by General Soemitro as an effort to regulate them. This was because the gangs were seen as increasingly threatening the position of the state and its political actors. The period of petrus, however, saw the execution of many premans and galis. The aftermath of petrus saw an increasing number of thugs and gangsters joining the different nationalist and youth organizations like Pemuda Pancasila. This action was prompted out of fear as they realized the need for state back-up to ensure their survival.

"That's life in Jakarta, if you don't step on someone you will get stepped on. On my own, I'll just end up being a victim, but together, we are a force to be reckoned with"

— Interview with FBR member, Jakarta 2008

==== Post-New Order ====
Under Habibie, as defense of the state was correlated with defense of Islam, the groups acted as a state-sponsored bulwark against the demands of the student-based reform movement. The local preman organizations became institutionalized as part of the democratic process whereby they started to form their own political parties. However, there was also a split in the new breed of preman organizations. While organizations such as the Patriot Party (Pemuda Pancasila) continue to portray themselves as defenders of national unity, the new breed organized themselves along post-Pancasila ethnic and religious lines. This new breed includes the Betawi Brotherhood Forum and Front Pembela Islam. Local preman groups preferred to be affiliated to bigger group such as the above that have already established a name for themselves. This allowed for them to "ride on the tails of other jagos' success". Being associated to larger groups also means better political affiliation as well as power.

== See also ==
- Organised crime in Indonesia
