= Hercules (gangster) =

Indonesian gangster and political broker

Rosario de Marçal
- Born: Rosario de Marçal; May 27, 1968 (age 58); Portuguese Timor (Now Timor-Leste)
- Other name: Hercules
- Occupations: Gangster; Political Broker
- Years active: 1990–present
- Known for: Pro-Government militia leader; Gang leader of various gangs in Tanah Abang; Leading grassroot political networks for the Gerindra party

Rosario de Marçal, (also spelled Marshall) (Portuguese pronunciation: [ʁu.zɐ.ˈɾi.u dɨ maɾ.ˈsaɫ]; born 27 May 1968) commonly known as Hercules, is an Indonesian gangster and political broker hailed from the current Timor-Leste. Hercules was a porter for the Indonesian army during the Indonesian occupation of East Timor. Once moved to Jakarta, he formed his own preman gang in the Tanah Abang district, ruling the Jakartan criminal underworld during the 1990s. Today, Hercules retains a celebrity status as a fearsome gangster, occasionally appearing on TV programs as well as tabloid magazines. He is also notable for his political ties with the 2014 and 2019 Indonesian presidential election candidate and current president Prabowo Subianto.

== Biography ==
Rosario was born in the 1960s in the Portuguese Timor, growing up during the chaotic era in the backdrop of the Indonesian invasion of East Timor (1975—1976) and the subsequent occupation by the Indonesian national army. He first made contact with the Indonesian army through colonel Gatot Purwanto around 1975. He was then orphaned in 1978 after his parents were killed in a bombing hitting the town of Ainaro. Since then, he was incorporated as a courier who provided logistical assistance to the Indonesian special forces, Kopassus under the Tenaga Bantuan Operasi (TBO) program. "Hercules" was a code name given to Rosario by the Kopassus' radio communication team.

During his year as a TBO personnel, Hercules was involved in a skirmish with the Falintil pro-independence resistance. His helicopter crashed during the fighting, leading to him losing his right eye and right hand. Hercules was then taken to Gatot Soebroto Army Hospital in Jakarta for operation. Hercules thanked Prabowo Subianto, who was serving a commander of Nanggala commando units, for the support he received during this time. Hercules is known for having "unwavering" loyalty toward Prabowo since then.

Since the late 1980s, Hercules settled in Jakarta along with several East Timorese youths, given a job of electrical parts engineer. He soon abandoned the job, moving to the commercial district of Tanah Abang after switching jobs. After settling in Tanah Abang, he formed a preman gang along with the fellow Timorese migrants, including Logo Vallenberg and Alfredo Monteiro Pires. He then immediately succeed to build his enterprise through racketeering and pimping businesses. He also carried out political extortion on behalf of the Indonesian army, to weed out and intimidate pro-independence Timorese movements in Jakarta.

His preman empire collapsed in the late 1990s after some of the members of the Hercules gang refused to participate in the pro-integration rally. Since then, his gang lost military protection, and Prabowo allowed other preman gangs to take over Tanah Abang underground. He was dethroned after brutal fighting against Ambonese, Betawi and Madurese gangs, led by figures such as Muhammad "Bang Ucu" Yusuf and Abraham Lunggana.

After being overthrown from the Tanah Abang underworld, he rebuilt his reputation through debt collecting and security businesses. He owned multiple lands as well as agricultural and fishery businesses, turning him into akin to philanthropist figure. He was a respected figure among the migrants from East Indonesia, providing newcomers jobs, networks as well and protections. He remained in rivalry against other organized crime figures as well, including John Kei and Basri Sangaji. Since 2008, Prabowo reapproached Hercules after founding the Great Indonesia Movement (Gerindra) Party. A social organization called the Peoples Movement for a New Indonesia (GRIB) was established in 2011 by Hercules to mobilize his network of preman gangsters, local strongmen, religious vigilante groups, and ex-militia for the grassroots level political support toward Prabowo. Various reports estimates that GRIB organization could gather around 15,000 people during their anniversary, To 25,000 people in the aftermath of November 2024 Indonesian local elections celebrating the election of Prabowo.
