= The Divide (2015 film) =

- UK Theatrical Poster
- Directed by: Katharine Round
- Produced by: Katharine Round; Christopher Hird
- Cinematography: Woody James
- Edited by: John Mister
- Music by: Andrew Hewitt
- Production companies: Dartmouth Films; Literally Films
- Distributed by: Dartmouth Films (UK)
- Release dates: November 2015 (Ireland); 22 April 2016 (UK)
- Running time: 78 minutes
- Countries: United Kingdom; United States
- Language: English

The Divide is a 2015 documentary film directed by British filmmaker Katharine Round. It was produced by Katharine Round and Christopher Hird. It is an adaptation of the acclaimed 2009 socio-economic book The Spirit Level by Richard G. Wilkinson and Kate Pickett. The book argues that there are "pernicious effects that inequality has on societies: eroding trust, increasing anxiety and illness, (and) encouraging excessive consumption".

Originally titled The Spirit Level, The film ran a successful crowdfunding campaign through IndieGoGo, raising £70,000, £20,000 more than expected. The film was completed in 2015 and previewed that same year. It was released theatrically in the UK in April 2016. A US release is set to follow later in 2016. It was launched on Netflix on October 3, 2016 with streaming capabilities for US and UK territories only.

The film has appeared at several major film festivals including: Sheffield Doc/Fest (June 2015), Open City Film Festival in London(June 2015) where it was nominated for Best UK Film, Cork Film Festival (November 2015), and ZagrebDox Film Festival (February 2016).

== Synopsis ==
As many Western countries have become richer, they've seemingly become unhappier; with fearful communities, health problems and violent deaths becoming more common not less. The Divide weaves together seven stories to paint a picture of how economic division creates social division. The film depicts the startling truth of struggling to make ends meet in America. Together, it ties the mentality that developed countries have become based around consumerism, materialism and the idea of happiness that these objects and actions should be in your life, despite that they seem to be perpetuating the individuals struggle. The Divide also showed that inequality can come from the people; how they view your "image", status, and neighborhood in which it can displayed either wealth or poverty.

== Cast ==
- Alden Cass — an American Wall Street Psychologist
- Jennifer Cooper — an American Gated community resident
- Darren McGarvey — Scottish rapper Loki, a former alcoholic
- Rochelle Monte — an English Careworker
- Janet Sparks — an American Walmart associate
- Leah Taylor — an American KFC attendant
- Keith Thomas — an American Three-strikes prisoner
- Kwame Anthony Appiah — commentator
- Rich Benjamin — commentator
- Richard Berman — commentator
- Alan Budd — commentator
- Ha-Joon Chang — commentator
- Noam Chomsky — commentator
- Richard Frank — commentator
- Alexis Goldstein — commentator
- Max Hastings — commentator
- Michael Marmot — commentator
- Cathy O'Neil — commentator
- Kate Pickett — commentator
- Paul Piff — commentator
- Richard G. Wilkinson — commentator
