= Mary Katherine Blackwood =

- First appearance: We Have Always Lived in the Castle
- Created by: Shirley Jackson
- Portrayed by: Heather Menzies (1966 Broadway); Alexandra Socha (2010 Broadway); Taissa Farmiga (film)

In-universe information
- Nickname: Merricat
- Gender: Female
- Family: John Blackwood (father; deceased); Lucy Blackwood (mother; deceased); Constance Blackwood (sister); Thomas Blackwood (brother; deceased)
- Relatives: Julian Blackwood (uncle; deceased); Dorothy Blackwood (aunt; deceased); Arthur Blackwood (uncle; deceased); Charles Blackwood (cousin)

Mary Katherine Blackwood is the main character in Shirley Jackson's 1962 novel, We Have Always Lived in the Castle. The eighteen-year-old "Merricat" lives with her remaining family members, Constance and Julian Blackwood, on an estate in Vermont. As a result of a tragedy six years prior the family remains isolated from the surrounding village. The Dictionary of Literary Characters designates a "definition" to Merricat as follows:

Reclusive, psychotic 18-year-old who lives in the family manse with her older sister, Constance Blackwood, and her uncle, Julian Blackwood, as a child, poisoned most of her family in Shirley Jackson's We Have Always Lived in the Castle.

She practices sympathetic magic in order to keep her family out of harm's way. Extremely superstitious, she exudes mysterious behavior and further shows signs of psychopathy and obsessive–compulsive disorder as her role expands.

== Concept and creation ==
In the years leading up to the publishing of We Have Always Lived in the Castle, Shirley Jackson's health was on a steady decline. And in turn, her "protagonists grew increasingly disturbed until Jackson created Merricat Blackwood, a psychotic killer."

== Appearances ==
=== We Have Always Lived in the Castle ===
Merricat makes her original appearance in Shirley Jackson's 1962 novel, We Have Always Lived in the Castle. Alongside her remaining family members she lives a secluded life, ostracized by the surrounding village.

=== Plays ===
A Broadway production of We Have Always Lived in the Castle opened at the Ethel Barrymore Theatre on October 19, 1966, and closed on October 26, 1966, for a total of nine performances. In the play, Merricat was portrayed by Heather Menzies.

In 2010, Adam Bock and Todd Almond staged a musical adaptation of Jackson's novel at the Yale Repertory Theatre in New Haven, Connecticut, with Alexandra Socha in the role of Merricat. The musical ran from September 23 to October 9.

=== Film appearance ===
In August 2009, We Have Always Lived in the Castle was adapted for the screen by Further Films. After several years of pre-production and casting, Taissa Farmiga was cast in the role of Merricat.

== Characterization ==
On the opening page of We Have Always Lived in the Castle, Merricat describes herself as such:

My Name is Mary Katherine Blackwood. I am eighteen years old, and I live with my sister Constance. I have often thought that with any luck at all I could have been born a werewolf, because the two middle fingers on both my hands are the same length, but I have had to be content with what I had. I dislike washing myself, and dogs, and noise. I like my sister Constance, and Richard Plantagenet, and Amanita phalloides, the deathcup mushroom... Everyone else in my family is dead.

Marisa Silver sees Merricat's opening monologue as "brazen, creepy, obviously unreliable and utterly disarming." Merricat describes herself as 18 during the events of the novel but her actions represent a child of much younger age, "smashing things when she's upset and getting lost in her reveries of living on the moon." Silver continues to say that Merricat's opening words are reflective of the childlike way in which she acts and how she is treated by her surviving family members. Readers can see early signs of Merricat's affinity for violence when she speaks of the villagers:

Without looking, I could see the grinning and the gesturing: I wished they were all dead and I was walking on their bodies.

This hatred for the villagers is apparent in Merricat's attitude throughout the novel, as the family's "ostracism by the community" has taken a toll on the Blackwood family. In order to deal with her exile, Merricat has a number of eccentricities, namely her obsessive behaviors. Merricat has strange habits of "burying coins, nailing books to trees, and even choosing specific magical words that she will not say."

As a result of social rejection, Shirley Jackson writes that Merricat, along with her family, have become representative of Jackson's agoraphobia. Merricat's deranged and agoraphobic behaviors can be seen in her handling of Cousin Charles. Charles's appearance brings out a longing for change in sister Constance but Merricat, so frightened by the "change and disorder" this would bring, chooses to set the house on fire. Silver notes that rather than accept a new order in her (Merricat's) life, she, quite literally, chooses to let the world burn down around her.

Merricat's questionable decision-making lends an argument for the unreliable narrator. Angela Slatter quotes the film The Usual Suspects to describe Merricat: "The greatest trick the Devil ever pulled was convincing the world he didn't exist." Merricat allures readers by making "us love this strange, broken girl" but, upon revealing her true nature with the climax of the novel, she "breaks our hearts". She is in fact "jealous, dangerously so; when there seems the prospect of a kind of happiness... Merricat does her destructive best to derail it."

== Critical reception ==
Barbara Hodge Hall, of The Anniston Star, had this to say of Merricat upon We Have Always Lived in the Castle's initial release in 1962: "Merricat is 18, but a strange 18, still child-like in habits but a thousand years old in intuition."

Lynette Carpenter, featured in the journal Frontiers: A Journal of Women Studies, sees Merricat in a more feminist point of view. Carpenter's article, "The Establishment and Preservation of Female Power in Shirley Jackson's 'We Have Always Lived in the Castle,'" claims that Merricat has drawn a blow against "masculine authority" as power has shifted from "the Blackwood men to the Blackwood women." Thus Merricat, displaying a "forceful establishment of power" over her own life, "threatens a society in which men hold primary power" and this display of power will "inevitably [lead] to confrontation."

Judith Colombo of The Weekly Gleaner sees Merricat as "the perfect tragic hero." Colombo sees her as desperate to care for her family, but when her polite and magical means fail her, she turns to more "desperate methods."

Joyce Carol Oates, who has written of Merricat as a character on many occasions, has said "Of all the precocious children and adolescents of mid-twentieth-century American fiction—a dazzling lot that includes the tomboys Frankie of Carson McCullers's The Member of the Wedding (1946) and Scout Finch of Harper Lee's To Kill a Mockingbird (1960), the murderous eight-year-old Rhoda Penmark of William March's The Bad Seed (1954), and the slightly older, disaffected Holden Caulfield of J.D. Salinger's The Catcher in the Rye (1951) and Esther Greenwood of Sylvia Plath's The Bell Jar (1963)—none is more memorable than eighteen-year-old 'Merricat' of Shirley Jackson's masterpiece of Gothic suspense We Have Always Lived in the Castle (1962)... Merricat speaks with a seductive and disturbing authority, never drawn to justifying her actions but recounting them."
