= Loki (rapper) =

Scottish rapper

- Born: Darren McGarvey; 1984; Scotland
- Genre: Hip hop
- Occupations: Rapper, Writer
- Years active: 2004–present

Darren McGarvey FRSL, who goes by the stage name Loki, is a Scottish rapper and social commentator. He was an activist during the Scottish independence referendum in 2014.

== Early life ==
McGarvey was brought up in Pollok on the south side of Glasgow, Scotland. He is from a political and performance family: his aunt is the former Member of the Scottish Parliament (MSP) Rosie McGarvey Kane.

He studied journalism at Glasgow Clyde College.

== Career ==
Between 2004 and 2006, he wrote and presented eight programmes about the causes of anti-social behaviour and social deprivation for BBC Radio Scotland. McGarvey worked with youth organisation Volition, teaching young people to rap. In 2012 he led a workshop as part of a PowerRap competition for schools, encouraging young people to explore important issues through music and language.

In 2009, he was part of the Poverty Truth Commission hosted in Glasgow. In 2015, he had six months as rapper-in-residence with the Violence Reduction Unit.

In April 2016, McGarvey appeared in a documentary The Divide discussing his alcoholism and its impact on his life.

In October 2017, he claimed a lack of support for working class or deprived communities from Creative Scotland, the main body that funds Scotland's arts companies and artists. He also admitted he had not tried to apply for Creative Scotland funds.

Loki's Poverty Safari won the 2018 Orwell Prize for books, with the judges saying it "was 'exactly the book' that Orwell would have wanted to win".

In December 2022, McGarvey gave a speech on "Freedom from Want" as one of four Reith Lectures for the BBC based on US President Franklin D. Roosevelt's "Four Freedoms" 1941 State of the Union address.

In 2023, he was elected a Fellow of the Royal Society of Literature.

== Works ==
=== Discography ===
- Government Issue Music Protest (GIMP) (2014), a science-fiction concept album with significant contributions from singer-songwriter Becci Wallace which enjoyed some critical acclaim. The album describes a dystopian vision of Scotland in the year 2034.
- Trigger Warning (2017), a concept album through which he attempts to explore various issues, expressed as a story.

=== Bibliography ===
- Poverty Safari: Understanding the Anger of Britain's Underclass, Luath Press, 2017 ISBN 9781912147038
  - in German: Transl. Klaus Berr, Armutssafari. Von der Wut der abgehängten Unterschicht. Luchterhand, Munich 2019
- The Social Distance Between Us: How Remote Politics Wrecked Britain, Ebury Press, 2022 ISBN 9781529104080
- Trauma Industrial Complex, Random House, 2025 ISBN 978-1-5291-0389-2

=== Television ===
- Darren McGarvey's Scotland – BBC Scotland – Darren "Loki" McGarvey investigates the rise of poverty and inequality in Scotland
- Darren McGarvey's Class Wars – BBC Scotland
- Darren McGarvey's Addictions – BBC Scotland
- Darren McGarvey: The State We’re In – BBC Scotland
