= Tristan Anderson =

British filmmaker

Tristan C. Anderson is a BAFTA & WEBBY award winning documentary filmmaker and musician born, based and raised in London, England.

He has made films for the BBC, Channel 4, The Guardian, London Live. As a freelancer he was a lead creative and flagship director of documentaries on the Emmy Award winning Current TV.

The Three Michaels was his first feature documentary as co-creator and solo producer. The film was acquired by Amazon Prime and released in October 2024 in the UK & US. Gaining high prise from The Guardian.

He has produced or directed film which have screened at Bafta, the Houses of Parliament, Sheffield Doc Fest, Krakow Film festival, Warsaw Film festival, Open City Documentary Festival, Doc’n Roll Film festival, Encounters Film festival & London Short film festival.

Tristan is also one of the founders (with Katharine Round) of 'DocHeads', a dedicated documentary screening, networking, and funding organization that promotes the work of documentary filmmakers.

He is the creator of the term "Pop Doc," an experimental new genre of music video-cum-documentary that bridges the conventions of both forms, where the song serves as the score and/or the documentary provides the visuals. He showcased this genre in his recent album #Soundtracks, the world’s first music video documentary album, consisting of 8 songs paired with 8 films. After writing the album, he collaborated with directors to create the accompanying films.

== Filmography ==
- CASTA (2026) - Director/Producer/DOP - Documentary
- The Three Michaels (2024) - Producer/Co-Creator - Feature documentary
- What counts as a classic? - (2022) Audible 101
- The Bat Man (2019) - New York Post
- Exodus(2017) - Krakow Film Festival * Co-Director
- A Divorce Before Marriage (2016) - Co-Producer - Feature documentary
- My F**ked Brain (2016) - Channel 4 / All 4
- What Is Art? (2016) BBC
- Faith in the Aerosol (2015) - StoryHunter
- Extreme Unicycling (2015) - Channel 4 / All 4
- His City His Story (2015) - StoryHunter
- Double Vision (2014) - Channel 4 / All 4
- Right to Run (2014) - The Guardian Online *Co-Director
- Anti-Social Worker (2014) - London Live
- Drug Stories (2014) - BBC
- Forgive or Forget (2014) - The Guardian Online
- Soft Bullets (2013) - London Short Film Festival
- Just a Few Drinks (2012) - BBC Two
- The Sound of Change (2012) - Community Channel
- Badges of Convenience (2012) Channel 4 **Co-director
- What Did I Do Last Night? : Series 1 & 2 - (2011 - 2012) - Current TV
- The Day My Face Changed (2009) - Current TV
- Why Am I Going Grey? (2009) - Current TV
- The Dark Side Of Fame (2009) - Current TV
- Sexy Girls Have It Easy (2008) - Current TV
- My Drunken Shame (2008) - Current TV
- Cocaine Nightmare (2008) - Current TV
- Free Fall: Dive of Dave (2008) - Current TV

== Musicianship ==
Tristan's music has been featured on the BBC and Current TV. He continues to release music under his name Tristan C.Anderson, as well as ArtWars for electronic tracks and moon junior his 'folk/rock' alter ego.

== Discography ==
- Moon Junior – Re‑Focus (2023)
- Tristan C Anderson – Heavy Meditation (2021)
- Tristan C Anderson – #Soundtracks (2018)
- ArtWars – No Hands (2016)
- ArtWars – Islands (2015)
- ArtWars – Digital Church (2014)
- ArtWars – Revolutions (2013)
- ArtWars – ArtWars (2008)
- Moon Junior – Modern Sign Language (2005)
