= John Kei =

Indonesian gangster

John Refra
- Born: September 10, 1969 (age 57); Tutrean, Kei Island, Maluku Islands
- Other name: John Kei
- Occupations: Gangster; Debt Collector
- Years active: 1991–present
- Known for: Killing of Tan Harry Tantono; Founder of the civic organization Angkatan Muda Kei
- Relatives: Walterus Refra; Semmy Refra; Charles Refra; Jermy Refra; Fransiscus "Tito" Refra

John Refra (September 10, 1969), popularly known as John Kei, is an Indonesian gangster of Sember origin. John Kei has operated a debt collection business through his organization Angkatan Muda Kei (Kei Youth Force, AMKEI). His debt collection ring has become one of the largest gang organizations in Jakarta, together with Hercules, Basri Sangaji, and Thalib Makarim's gangs.

John Kei has been arrested multiple times, including in 2004 for alleged involvement in the murder of Basri Sangaji, and 2012 for involvement in the murder of Tan Harry Tantono, the director of Sanex Stell Mandiri. After the incident, he was sentenced to 16 years in prison. He was paroled in 2019 but arrested again in 2020 for a shooting of his relative Nus Kei. John Kei is sometimes referred to as the "Godfather of Jakarta" because of his mafia-style business practice and repeatedly dodged prosecution.

== Biography ==
John Refra was born in Kei islands of Southeast Maluku. His nickname "John Kei" refers to his hometown. He immigrated to Jakarta in 1991 and founded the organization AMKEI in 2000.

AMKEI grew into a major debt collecting ring and competed with debt collectors of fellow Ambonese gangster Basri Sangaji from North Maluku. At the height of their rivalry, two gangs clashed when Basri's clan was serving as security at a disco in West Jakarta. Two of his men were killed and the case was tried at the West Jakarta District Court. During the trial, another clash broke out between the two gangs, which resulted in the killing of John Kei's older brothers, Walterus Refra Kei and Semmy Kei.

John Kei allegedly ordered a hit on Basri Sangaji as retaliation. Basri Sangaji was murdered at the Hotel Kebayoran Inn on October 12, 2004. John Kei's gang members were suspected to be involved in the homicide and eight of them were named suspects, and John Kei was arrested by the Greater Jakarta Metropolitan Regional Police (Polda Metro Jaya). However, he was released due to the lack of evidence. John Kei's clan came out dominant in the aftermath of this rivalry due to Basri's downfall.

John Kei was arrested again in 2008 by the Special Anti-terror Detachment in Ohoijang Village, Tual, Maluku, on August 11, 2008. He was suspected of torturing and cutting off the fingers of Charles Refra and Jemry Refra, both of whom were his brothers. John Kei was tried at the Surabaya District Court on March 3, 2009. The Surabaya District Court sentenced John Kei to eight months in prison.

In 2010, John Kei's group got involved in a riot against the Flores Ende group led by Thalib Makarim. It was triggered by an argument between one of Kei's members and the guards of the Blowfish Kitchen & Bar nightclub in South Jakarta. Four people from the Flores Ende group were then tried at the South Jakarta District Court for allegedly killing two people from the Kei group.

On February 17, 2012, John Kei was arrested by Polda Metro Jaya at the C'One Hotel, Pulomas, East Jakarta. He was accused of involvement in the premeditated murder of Tan Harry Tantono, a steel smelter who allegedly has relations with several politicians. Tantono was considered to be murdered on January 26, 2012, and found dead with 32 stab wounds in room 2701 at the Swiss-Bell Hotel. John Kei was sentenced to 12 years in prison at the end of 2012. On July 29, 2013, the Supreme Court increased John's sentence to 16 years. He was then transferred from the Salemba Prison to the Nusakambangan Prison. John was paroled on December 26, 2019; he was supposed to be jailed until 2028 but got a remission for 36 months and 30 days so he will be completely free in March 2025.

On June 22, 2020, John Kei was arrested by the General Criminal Directorate of Polda Metro Jaya, Tangerang City Police, and Bekasi City Police, on suspicion of assault and shooting of Nus Kei, a relative of John Kei, in Tangerang City. The shooting was considered to be stemmed from the land issues and distribution of money. The police raided the house in Bekasi which was suspected to be the headquarters of the John Kei group. 25 people, including John, were arrested. After the case was developed, five other members were also arrested.
