= The Spirit Level (Wilkinson and Pickett book) =

2009 book by Richard G. Wilkinson and Kate Pickett

The Spirit Level: Why More Equal Societies Almost Always Do Better
- Front cover
- Author: Richard Wilkinson, Kate Pickett
- Language: English
- Subject: Socio-economics
- Genre: Non-fiction
- Publisher: Allen Lane
- Publication date: 5 March 2009
- Publication place: United Kingdom
- Media type: Print, e-book
- Pages: 352
- ISBN: 1-84614-039-0

The Spirit Level: Why More Equal Societies Almost Always Do Better is a book by Richard G. Wilkinson and Kate Pickett, published in 2009 by Allen Lane. The book is published in the US by Bloomsbury Press (December, 2009) with the new sub-title: Why Greater Equality Makes Societies Stronger. It was then published in a paperback second edition (United Kingdom) in November 2010 by Penguin Books with the subtitle, Why Equality is Better for Everyone.

The book argues that there are "pernicious effects that inequality has on societies: eroding trust, increasing anxiety and illness, (and) encouraging excessive consumption". It claims that for each of eleven different health and social problems: physical health, mental health, drug abuse, education, imprisonment, obesity, social mobility, trust and community life, violence, teenage pregnancies, and child well-being, outcomes are significantly worse in more unequal countries, whether rich or poor. The book contains diagrams (scatter plots) that are available online.

In 2010, the authors published responses to questions about their analysis on the Equality Trust website. As of September 2012, the book had sold more than 150,000 copies in English. It is available in 23 foreign editions.

In July 2024, Wilson and Pickett produced an updated version of the book called The Spirit Level at 15: The Enduring Impact of Inequality, noting that inequality had worsened since their 2009 original.

== Contents ==
=== Part I. Material Success, Social Failure ===
- The end of an era
- Poverty or Economic inequality?
- How inequality gets under the skin

=== Part II. The Costs of Inequality ===
- Community life and social relations
- Mental health and drug use
- Physical health and life expectancy
- Obesity: wider income gaps, wider waists
- Educational performance
- Teenage births: recycling deprivation
- Violence: gaining respect
- Imprisonment and punishment
- Social mobility unequal opportunities

=== Part III. A Better Society ===
- Dysfunctional societies
- Our social inheritance
- Equality and sustainability
- Building the future

== Reception ==
=== Positive reviews ===
In a review for Nature, Michael Sargent said that "In their new book, epidemiologists Richard Wilkinson and Kate Pickett extend this idea" (of the harm caused by status differences) "with a far-reaching analysis of the social consequences of income inequality. Using statistics from reputable independent sources, they compare indices of health and social development in 23 of the world's richest nations and in the individual US states. Their striking conclusion is that the societies that do best for their citizens are those with the narrowest income differentials—such as Japan and the Nordic countries and the US state of New Hampshire. The most unequal—the United States as a whole, the United Kingdom and Portugal—do worst."

In the London Review of Books University of Cambridge lecturer David Runciman said that the book fudged the issue of its subtitle thesis of its UK first edition, and asked whether it is that "in more equal societies almost everyone does better, or is it simply that everyone does better on average?" Later in the review he stated that, "More equality is a good thing and it’s an idea that’s worth defending." Richard Wilkinson responded to the review in a letter, claiming that "while pointing out that we do not have evidence on the fraction of one percent who are very rich, we show that people at all other levels of the social hierarchy do better in more equal societies".

Boyd Tonkin, writing in The Independent, described it as "an intellectual flagship of post-crisis compassion, this reader-friendly fusion of number-crunching and moral uplift has helped steer a debate about the route to a kinder, fairer nation. Will Hutton in The Observer described it as "A remarkable new book ...the implications are profound." Roy Hattersley in the New Statesman called it "a crucial contribution to the ideological argument", and the New Statesman listed it as one of their top ten books of the decade.

=== Critical response ===
John Kay wrote in the Financial Times that the book "is a powerful counter to any simple equation of social progress and the advance of GDP", but he warned that the causal relationships are complex, and said that other studies, such as the World Values Survey, could also explain high performance of societies such as Sweden and Japan. He said that "the evidence presented in the book is mostly a series of scatter diagrams, with a regression line drawn through them. No data is provided on the estimated equations, or on relevant statistical tests". The significance tests and correlation coefficients were included in the November 2010 revised paperback edition of the book, and also appear on the Equality Trust website, where source data is also available and there is an explanation for the omission that "the book's intended readership was not confined to those with statistical training".

Richard Reeves in The Guardian called the book "a thorough-going attempt to demonstrate scientifically the benefits of a smaller gap between rich and poor", but said there were problems with the book's approach. "Drawing a line through a series of data points signals nothing concrete about statistical significance ... since they do not provide any statistical analyses, this can't be verified." He later noted that, "The Spirit Level is strongest on Wilkinson's home turf: health. The links between average health outcomes and income inequality do appear strong, and disturbing". The Guardian ranked The Spirit Level #79 in its list of 100 Best Books of the 21st Century.

In the European Sociological Review, sociologist John Goldthorpe argued that the book relied too heavily on income inequality over other forms of inequality (including broader economic inequality), and demonstrated a one-dimensional understanding of social stratification, with social class being in effect treated as merely a marker for income. He concluded that much more research was needed to support either the Wilkinson and Pickett "account of the psychosocial generation of the contextual effects of inequality on health or the rival neo-materialist account".

Charles Moore in The Daily Telegraph declared it to be "more a socialist tract than an objective analysis of poverty". Gerry Hassan in The Scotsman maintained against Wilkinson and Pickett's claim that "more equal societies almost always do better" that it "is not possible to make the claim that everyone gains from greater equality", and suggests one of the book's "central weaknesses" is the "absence of the importance of politics.... They let neo-liberalism and free market fundamentalism off the hook".

==== Re-analyses and alleged failures to replicate ====
In a 2017 essay, later published in his book Hanging on to the Edges, Daniel Nettle questioned whether Wilkinson and Pickett's psycho-social account of the effects of inequality was the main factor explaining the link between inequality and the various observed negative outcomes. With the use of some of his own simulations, he argues that if we assume there are diminishing returns to income, the correlational patterns observed in The Spirit Level are to be expected. He concludes that both the psycho-social effects described in The Spirit Level and the impact of diminishing returns to income likely both contribute to explaining the observed correlations, and questions why Wilkinson and Pickett neglect to mention the latter explanation in their book.

In 2010, Tino Sanandaji and others wrote an article for the Wall Street Journal in which they said, "when we attempted to duplicate their findings with data from the U.N. and the Organisation for Economic Co-operation and Development (OECD), we found no such correlation". Pickett and Wilkinson addressed the Wall Street Journal article in a letter to the Journal and published a response to the Taxpayers Alliance report on their own site. In their response to the Wall Street Journal they said ,"...we use income inequality data from the United Nations, rather than the OECD, because the OECD data were not intended primarily for cross-national comparisons. However, even if we test our results using the OECD measures we find 28 of 29 relationships are still significant".'

Peter Robert Saunders, Professor Emeritus of Sociology at Sussex University, published a report for the think tank Policy Exchange questioning the statistics in The Spirit Level. He claimed that only one of the correlations in the book—that between infant mortality and income inequality—stood up to scrutiny, and that the rest were either false or ambiguous. Wilkinson and Pickett published a response defending each of the claims in the book and accusing Saunders in turn of flawed methodology. Saunders' statistical analysis was also assessed by Hugh Noble, who published an article explaining statistical inference in "The Spirit Level" and assessing the critique offered by Peter Saunders. Noble concluded that the critical analysis of The Spirit Level offered by Peter Saunders 'cannot be taken seriously because it contains so many serious technical flaws'.

Christopher Snowdon, an independent researcher and adjunct scholar at the Democracy Institute, published a book largely devoted to a critique of The Spirit Level, entitled, The Spirit Level Delusion: Fact-checking the Left's New Theory of Everything. One of its central claims is that the authors have cherry-picked throughout. Snowdon suggests that Wilkinson excludes certain countries from his data without justification, such as South Korea and the Czech Republic. The book includes homicide, but excludes suicide. Prison population is included, but not the crime rate or crime survey data. Government foreign aid is included, but (private) charitable giving is not. Datasets are selected or rejected to support the thesis of the authors. Likely cultural confounding factors are not taken into account. Regression lines are drawn which are dependent on a very small number of outlying countries, but this is not explained in the text. Correlation is confused with causation throughout. It also argues that Wilkinson and Pickett falsely claim the existence of a scientific consensus when much of the literature disagrees with their findings. Snowdon's book also asserts that some of Wilkinson's previous publications have been criticized on the basis that "the strength of the association...seems quite sensitive to which countries are included". Finally, in a reductio ad absurdum, the methods of TSL are used to show that the suicide rate is linked to the recycling rate. Wilkinson and Pickett released a response to questions from Snowdon and responded to similar criticisms in the Wall Street Journal. Snowdon has in turn responded to their response on his blog.

In response to criticism of the book, Wilkinson and Pickett posted a note on the Equality Trust website which stated: "Almost all of the research presented and synthesised in The Spirit Level had previously been peer-reviewed, and is fully referenced therein. In order to distinguish between well founded criticism and unsubstantiated claims made for political purposes, all future debate should take place in peer-reviewed publications." A Postscript chapter was also written in response to critics and is available in the US and UK second editions of The Spirit Level.

In 2011 the Joseph Rowntree Foundation commissioned an independent review of the evidence about the impact of inequality, paying particular attention to the evidence and arguments put forward in The Spirit Level. It concluded that the literature shows general agreement about a correlation between income inequality and health/social problems, though suggested there is less agreement about whether income inequality causes health and social problems independently of other factors. It argued for further research on income inequality and discussion of the policy implications.

== Impact ==
The authors of The Spirit Level co-founded The Equality Trust, whose 'Equality Pledge' was signed by 75 MPs prior to the UK's 2010 general election. Signatories promised to "actively support the case for policies designed to narrow the gap between rich and poor". Ed Miliband, former leader of the British Labour party, wrote about his admiration for The Spirit Level. His first speech as leader to the party conference contained several allusions to the book. David Cameron referred to the thesis of "The Spirit Level" in his 2010 Hugo Young Lecture, arguing "research by Richard Wilkson and Katie [sic] Pickett has shown that among the richest countries, it's the more unequal ones that do worse according to almost every quality of life indicator".

The book prompted a documentary, directed by British film-maker Katharine Round and produced by Round and Christopher Hird, called The Divide. The film ran one of the most successful UK documentary crowdfunding campaigns to date.

Think tank Class in association with The Equality Trust and My Fair London published a booklet drawing on The Spirit Level as well as presenting other essential information about income inequality.

In 2010, Richard Wilkinson was appointed the chair of Islington's Fairness Commission to examine ways of reducing income inequality in the London borough.

In July 2024, the authors noted inequality had worsened since the publication of their book 15 years ago, and presented an updated report on their findings to the then incoming UK Labour government.

== See also ==
- Gini coefficient
- Inequality for All, a 2013 documentary film directed by Jacob Kornbluth and narrated by Robert Reich.
- "It's 2059, and the Rich Kids are Still Winning", a 2019 short story by Ted Chiang.
- List of countries by income equality
- List of countries by inequality-adjusted HDI (Human Development Index)
