= Equality Trust =

UK registered charity

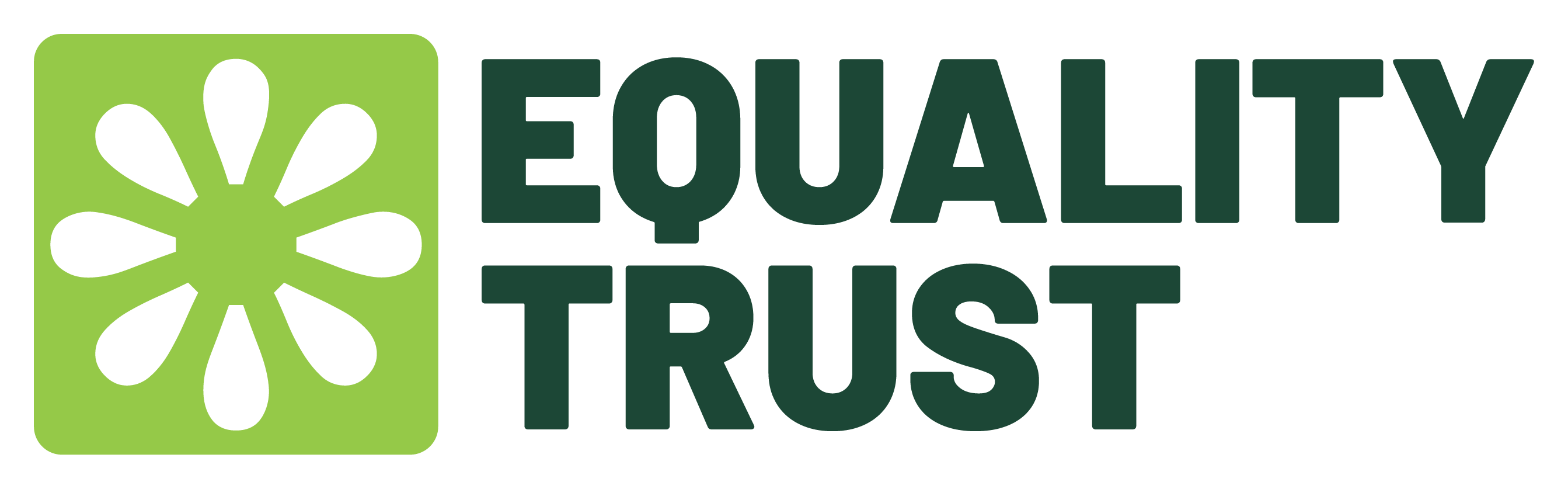
- Abbreviation: ET
- Formation: 5 May 2009; 17 years ago
- Founder: Bill Kerry, Richard G. Wilkinson, and Kate Pickett
- Type: Social inequality public policy think tank
- Headquarters: London
- Location: United Kingdom
- Website: equalitytrust.org.uk

The Equality Trust (ET) is a UK registered charity that campaigns against economic and social inequality. Founded as a campaigning organisation in 2009 by Bill Kerry, Richard G. Wilkinson and Kate Pickett after the publication of Wilkinson and Pickett's book The Spirit Level: Why More Equal Societies Almost Always Do Better, it became a registered charity in 2015.

The Trust's Co-Executive Directors are Jo Wittams and Priya Sahni-Nicholas.

== Work ==
The Equality Trust argues that there is a strong association between low economic growth and inequality.

The Trust campaigns for governments to take action on inequality, starting in the 2010 and 2015 UK general elections.

The Trust was cited by Caroline Lucas as demonstrating "a clear and demonstrable correlation between drug misuse and inequality" and that drug abuse is more common in more unequal countries such as the UK in her campaign for review of the Misuse of Drugs Act 1971.

Wilkinson and Pickett published a second book, The Inner Level: How More Equal Societies Reduce Stress, Restore Sanity and Improve Everybody's Wellbeing in 2018.

=== Billionaire Britain ===
The Trust's research on the rapid growth of billionaire wealth in the UK found that billionaire wealth had increased by over 1,000% from 1990 to 2022, and argued that wealth accumulation by the richest was harming the UK's society and economic stability. Their call for wealth taxes to tackle widening wealth inequality was echoed by other organisations.

=== Cost of Inequality ===
Research published by the Equality Trust in 2023 argued that inequality's impact on different areas of society were coming with large financial costs compared to more equal countries. They argued inequalities across society cost at least £106.2bn yearly compared to the average OECD country's level of equality, making the UK's top 1% the most expensive in Europe.

=== The Spirit Level at 15 ===
The Equality Trust released an update to the original Spirit Level book, written with Wilkinson and Pickett, that provided updates to the original research in The Spirit Level and expanded on its arguments with new research into inequality's impact on climate, democracy and society. Pickett and Wilkinson argued that the evidence for their argument that inequality caused poorer outcomes across society had grown stronger in the 15 years since the original publication, and said that inequality had gotten worse.
