= John Armstrong (British writer) =

British writer and philosopher (born 1966)

- Born: 1966 (age 58–59); Glasgow, Scotland

Philosophical work
- Region: Western Philosophy
- School: Analytic Philosophy, German Idealism
- Main interests: Ethics, Aesthetics, Education

John Armstrong (born 1966) is a British writer and philosopher living in Hobart, Australia. He was born in Glasgow and educated at Oxford and London, later directing the philosophy program at the University of London's School of Advanced Study. Armstrong was philosopher in residence at the Melbourne Business School and senior adviser to the vice-chancellor of Melbourne University until 2014. In 2014 he became a professorial fellow at the University of Tasmania. He is the author of several books on philosophical themes.

== Life and work ==
Armstrong's work has covered a range of themes including art, beauty, and civilisation. His work focuses on restoring traditional ways of thought by their modern application. Positive reviews of Armstrong's books have noted his accessible style and the importance of reviving the concepts of which he talks. Negative reviews have tended to criticise him for lacking a sense of history and irony.

The general task of this book is to elaborate the style of attention which works of art solicit. The cultivation of such a style is of importance because it is in the quality of our engagement that the human worth of art is apparent--art matters in virtue of the kind of experience it invites the spectator into. There is no access to art except in private--in looking, thinking, feeling as we stand before an individual work. Cultivation requires that we draw upon our own resources of sensitivity, reverie and contemplation, our capacity to invest our ideals and interests in the process of looking. Without these we can only know about art as detached observers who look on without being able to participate (like seeing people share a joke others don't quite catch).

— John Armstrong, Move Closer: An Intimate Philosophy of Art

His recent work has focused around developing a philosophical description of the concept of civilisation and applying it in the context of modern business and the humanities. Armstrong proposes that civilisation can best be thought of occurring when material and spiritual prosperity come together and mutually help each other. He also defines civilisation as "the life-support system for high-quality relationships to people, ideas and objects".

He is friends with Alain de Botton and the two have jointly authored the book Art as Therapy (2013). He works with The School of Life news website The Philosophers' Mail.

== Bibliography ==
- The Intimate Philosophy of Art (2000)
- Conditions of Love: The Philosophy of Intimacy (2002)
- The Secret Power of Beauty: Why Happiness is in the Eye of the Beholder (2005)
- Love, Life, Goethe: How to be Happy in an Imperfect World (2006)
- In Search of Civilisation: Remaking a Tarnished Idea (2009)
- How To Worry Less About Money (2012) The School of Life collection, MacMillan
- Art as Therapy. London: Phaidon, 2013. By Armstrong and Alain De Botton.
