= Ross Ashcroft =

British comedian, filmmaker, director and broadcaster (1977–2024)

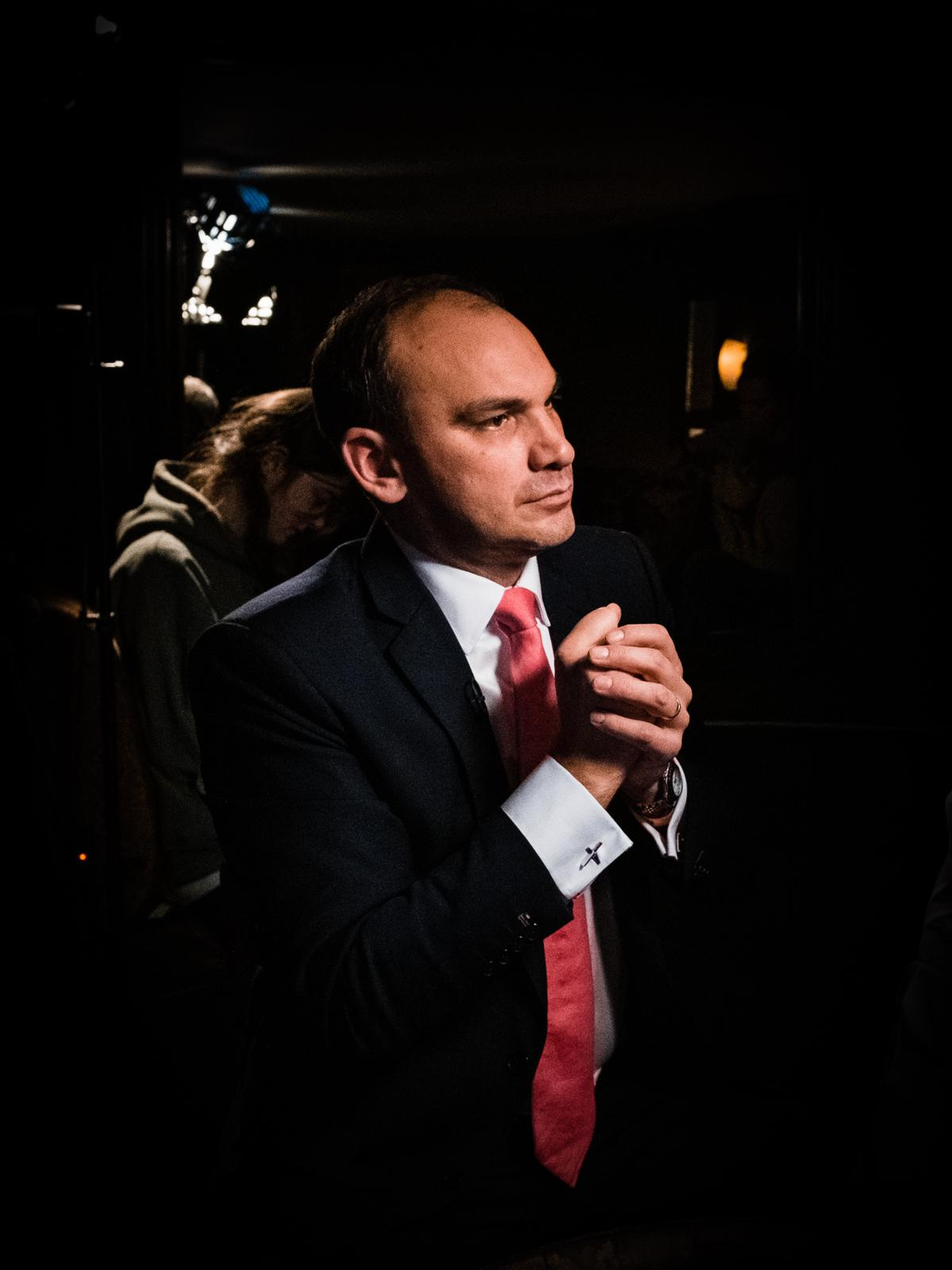
- Ashcroft at Kåkånomics in Norway in 2019
- Born: 3 October 1977 Liverpool, England
- Died: 13 December 2024 (aged 47)
- Education: St David's College, Llandudno, Royal Agricultural University
- Occupations: Entrepreneur, filmmaker, broadcaster
- Known for: Writer & director of Four Horsemen, Co-Author of 'Four Horsemen: The Survival Guide', Host of 'Renegade Inc'
- Spouse: Megan Ashcroft

Ross Ashcroft (3 October 1977 – 13 December 2024) was a British comedian, filmmaker, director and broadcaster.

== Early life and education ==
Ashcroft was born in Liverpool and grew up in the Metropolitan Borough of Wirral. He attended St David's College, Llandudno, where he excelled at sport and, as managing director of the Young Enterprise company, took it to the national finals. He was dyslexic and had a passion for entrepreneurship. He graduated from the Royal Agricultural University with a Bachelor of Science in Land Management.

== Career ==
=== Early work ===
Ashcroft worked briefly with the BBC and then went on to work at Everyman and Playhouse Youth Theatre in Liverpool as an Assistant Director. In 2002 he was assistant director for The New Shakespeare Company's 2002 season at Open Air Theatre, Regent's Park working on Romeo and Juliet, As You Like It and Oh, What a Lovely War! with Benedict Cumberbatch. Working with ACT Productions in London's West End his final assistant director role was on August Strindberg's play The Dance of Death in 2003 with Ian McKellen, Frances de la Tour and Owen Teale.

As a comedian, he won the Comedy Café New Act Award 2007. He was a semi-finalist of So You Think You're Funny in 2007 and a finalist in the Hackney Empire New Act of the Year in 2009.

=== Motherlode and Renegade ===
In 2007 he co-founded the London-based production and strategy house Motherlode. In 2009 Motherlode established an in-house brand 'Renegade Economist', as a response to mainstream economics and economist's failure to adequately explain the 2008 financial crisis. In 2016, Renegade Inc started broadcasting as a weekly television programme on Russia Today.

=== Four Horsemen ===
In 2012 his directorial debut film Four Horsemen premiered at the International Documentary Film Festival Amsterdam. It won 'Best International Documentary' at the Galway Film Fleadh and 'Best International Film' at the Tehran Film Festival.

For film features 23 international thinkers including Prof. Joseph Stiglitz, Prof Noam Chomsky, Gillian Tett, Ha-Joon Chang, Prof. Michael Hudson, Lawrence Wilkerson, Satish Kumar, Prof. Herman Daly and John Perkins.

The film fundamentally attacks neoclassical economics and asks why the neoclassical ideology, after such systemic failure, is still taught in almost all universities today.

==== Reception ====
Cinesthesiac said that Ashcroft "may be the first documentarist working in this field to elicit viable solutions from his interviewees, rather than baleful shrugs: you can't fail to emerge better informed, and better prepared to make the kinds of changes and perception shifts we need to make if we are to move forward from here."

Screen International said: "The refreshing thing about this film is that Ross Ashcroft also takes the viewer on a broader journey, linking in terrorism, global warming and poverty along with world finances to present a troubling picture of the world today."

== Books ==
In 2012 the book 'Four Horsemen: The Survival Manual' was published, which Ashcroft co-wrote with Mark Braund. It was the accompanying book to the documentary 'Four Horsemen'.

== Personal life ==
Ashcroft was married and lived in London for most of his adult life. He was a keen and accomplished cricketer, and a cricket coach.
