= Four Horsemen (film) =

- Directed by: Ross Ashcroft
- Written by: Ross Ashcroft; Dominic Frisby
- Produced by: Megan Ashcroft; Jason Whitmore; Ross Ashcroft
- Starring: Dominic Frisby
- Narrated by: Dominic Frisby
- Cinematography: Aladin Hasic; Claudio Napoli
- Edited by: Simon Modery
- Music by: Andrew Hewitt
- Production company: Motherlode
- Distributed by: Guerilla Films
- Release date: 14 April 2012
- Running time: 97 minutes
- Country: United Kingdom
- Language: English

Four Horsemen is a 2012 British documentary film directed by Ross Ashcroft. The film criticises the system of fractional reserve banking, debt-based economy and political lobbying by banks, which it regards as a serious threat to Western civilisation. It criticises the war on terror, which it maintains is not fought to eliminate al-Qaeda and other militant organizations, but to create larger debt to the banks. As an alternative, the film promotes a return to classical economics and the gold standard. Among those interviewed are Joseph Stiglitz, former chief economist at the World Bank; Noam Chomsky, linguistics professor; John Perkins, author of Confessions of an Economic Hit Man; ecological economist and steady-state theorist Herman Daly, formerly at the World Bank; and Max Keiser, TV host and former trader. The film was released in the United Kingdom on 14 March 2012. A book based on the film has been published.

== Summary ==
The film is divided into five sections: Empires, Banking, Terrorism, Resources and Progress. The film describes the four horsemen as: "a rapacious financial system, escalating organised violence, abject poverty for billions and the exhaustion of Earth's resources."

== Reception ==
In Time Out London, Derek Adams wrote: "Instead of bombarding us with sensational imagery and scaremongering, this competently narrated, intelligibly structured and cleverly illustrated film presents its case via a succession of insights from a group of smart, rational orators. ... This is a film perhaps better suited to DVD, simply because there are thoughts here of such profundity you might feel the need to reach for the rewind button. I, for one, have been left substantially enlightened." Peter Bradshaw wrote in The Guardian: "In these parlous times, there can never be enough criticism of bankers and tame politicians enjoying what Milton Friedman called socialism for the rich. Ashcroft's documentary lands some punches, but it is hampered by a PowerPoint-style presentation. ... Ashcroft unveils some bold cures at the end, but we need more specifics."
