= Stacie Passon =

American film director and screenwriter

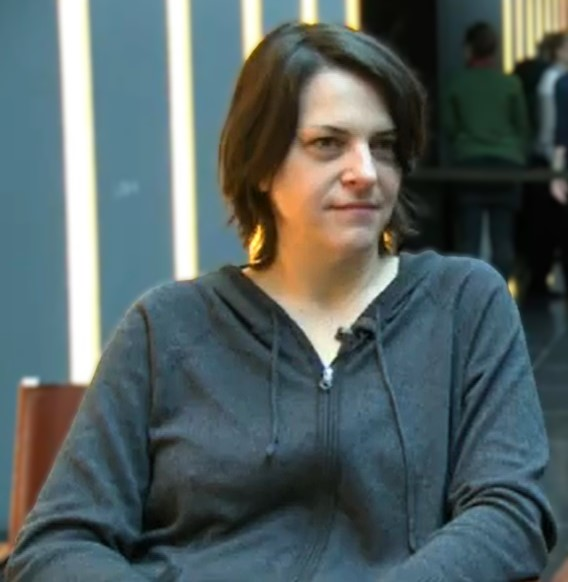
- Passon in 2014
- Born: Stacie Lyne Passon; October 1, 1969 (age 57); Detroit, Michigan, U.S.
- Education: Columbia College Chicago
- Occupations: Director; screenwriter; producer
- Years active: 1995–present

Stacie Passon is an American film director, screenwriter and producer whose first film, Concussion, was premiered at the 2013 Sundance Film Festival and subsequently won a Teddy Award Jury Prize at the 2013 Berlin International Film Festival.

== Personal life ==
Passon was born in Detroit, Michigan. She is Jewish. She attended Columbia College Chicago, from where she graduated in 1993.

== Career ==
Passon began her career as a commercial director and producer. Her 2013 film, Concussion], was nominated for the Gotham Independent Film Award for Breakthrough Director and the Independent Spirit Award for Best First Feature. It won a GLAAD Media Award for Outstanding Film – Limited Release. Passon has directed episodes of the Primetime Emmy Award-winning comedy series Transparent. In 2016, she was the executive producer of the comedy film, Women Who Kill. She directed the film adaptation of the Shirley Jackson novel We Have Always Lived in the Castle (2018) and was the executive producer and director of the six-part Sky drama Little Birds (2019). In 2021, it was announced that she would executive produce and direct The Serpent Queen for Lionsgate.

== Filmography ==
Film

- Concussion (2013) (Also writer)
- We Have Always Lived in the Castle (2018)

Television

Year	Title	Notes
2015–2016	Transparent	2 episodes
2017	The Last Tycoon	Episode "A Brady-American Christmas"
2017	Halt and Catch Fire	Episode "Tonya and Nancy"
2018	The Path	2 episodes
2018	Billions	Episode "Icebreaker"
2019	The Punisher	Episode "One-Eyed Jacks"
2019	American Gods	Episode "The Greatest Story Ever Told"
2019	The Society	Episode "Drop by Drop"
2019	Tales of the City	2 episodes
2019–2021	Dickinson	4 episodes
2022	The Serpent Queen	4 episodes
2023	Tiny Beautiful Things	2 Episodes
2023	Hello Tomorrow!	2 episodes
2023–2025	The Morning Show	4 Episodes
2025	Good American Family	Episode: Jump the Jitters Out
2025	Government Cheese	2 episodes
2026	Your Friends & Neighbors	2 episodes
2026	Elle	2 episodes

== See also ==
- Dramatic license
- LGBT culture in New York City
- List of female film and television directors
- List of lesbian filmmakers
- List of LGBT-related films directed by women
- List of LGBT people from New York City
- NYC Pride March
