= Katharine Round =

English documentary filmmaker

- Occupation: Documentary filmmaker

Katharine Round is an English documentary filmmaker. She is co-founder of the production company Disobedient Films, and Doc Heads (together with Tristan Anderson); a dedicated documentary screening organization that promotes the work of documentary filmmakers, with a focus on independent, artistic work.

In 2015, Round completed The Divide; which she directed and produced (co-producer Christopher Hird). In 2017, she produced the city symphony London Symphony, directed by Alex Barrett.
