= Further Films =

American film production company

Furthur Films
- Trade name: Furthur Films, Incorporated
- Type: Private
- Industry: Entertainment industry; Film industry; Television industry
- Predecessors: Bigstick Productions; Stonebridge Entertainment; Douglas/Reuther Productions
- Founded: November 19, 1997; 28 years ago in Universal City, California, United States
- Founder: Michael Douglas
- Headquarters: 62 West 45th Street, #901, New York City, New York, United States
- Key people: Allen Burry
- Products: Motion pictures

Furthur Films is an American independent film and television production company. It was founded by actor Michael Douglas on November 19, 1997. The company is based in New York City but has offices located in Universal City, California.

== History ==
The company came after the previous Douglas/Reuther Productions (nee Constellation Films) partnership broke up. The former Douglas/Reuther had signed a joint financing pact with Universal Pictures and Paramount Pictures in 1997, but no films came out of the deal, and Universal opted to sign Douglas instead to finance a film production company in 1997. The company also signed a second-look deal with October Films in 1998.

In May 1999, Furthur Films executive Allen Burry announced that the company was interested in acquiring Tom Wolfe's novel A Man in Full for development as a television series. In 2003, the company had signed a first-look deal with Warner Bros. Pictures.

== Filmography ==
- One Night at McCool's (2001)
- Don't Say a Word (2001)
- Swimfan (2002)
- It Runs in the Family (2003)
- The In-Laws (2003)
- The Sentinel (2006)
- Beyond the Reach (2014)
- Flatliners (2017)
- We Have Always Lived in the Castle (2018)
- Ratched (2020)
