= Richard G. Wilkinson =

British epidemiologist

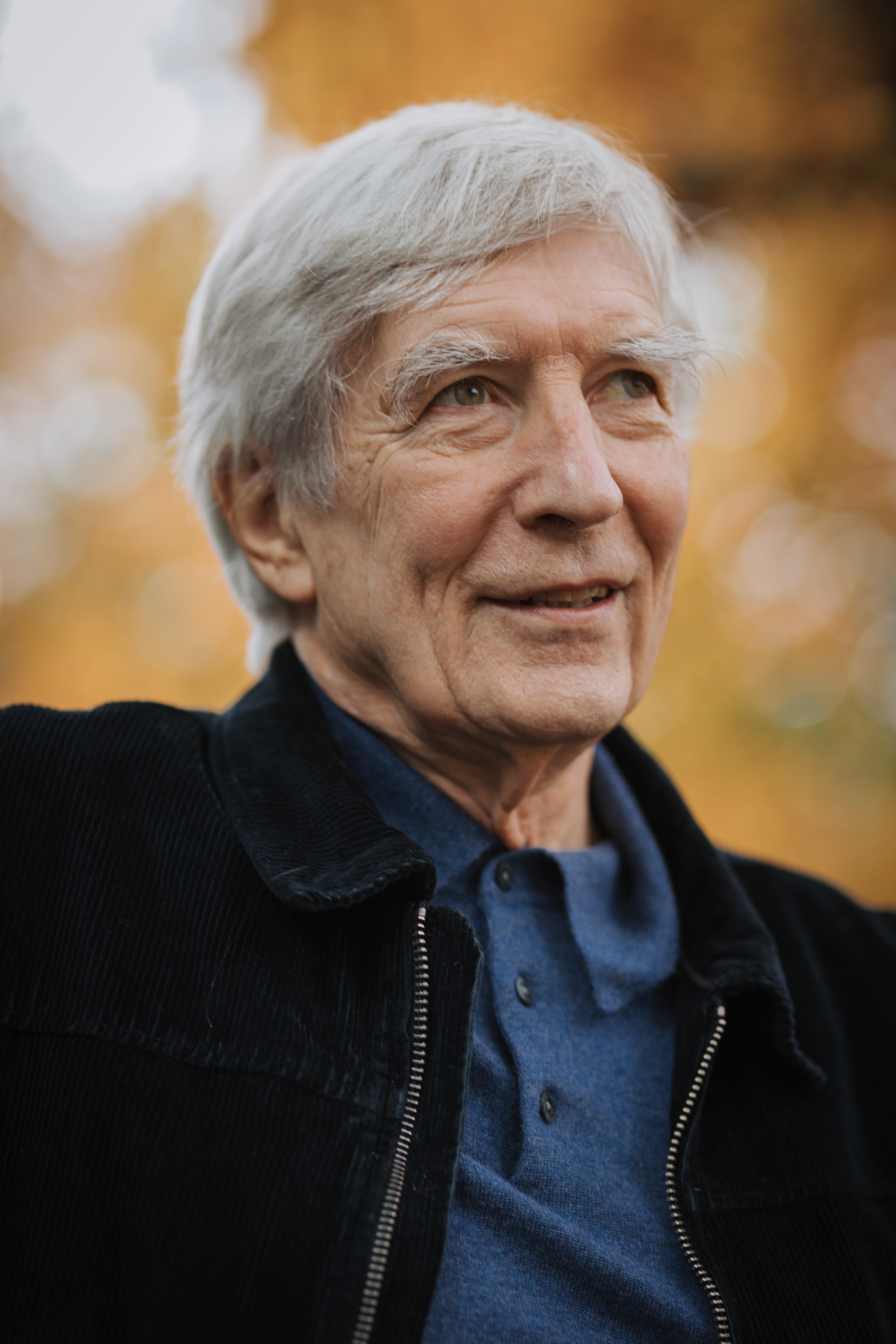
- Wilkinson in 2024
- Born: Richard Gerald Wilkinson; 1943 (age 82–83)
- Education: London School of Economics; University of Pennsylvania; University of Nottingham
- Known for: The Spirit Level
- Scientific career
- Fields: Social epidemiology Economic inequality
- Workplaces: University of Nottingham; University College London; University of York; University of Sussex

Richard Gerald Wilkinson (born 1943) is a British social epidemiologist, author, advocate, and left-wing political activist. He is Professor Emeritus of social epidemiology at the University of Nottingham, having retired in 2008. He is also Honorary Professor of Epidemiology and Public Health at University College London and Visiting Professor at University of York. In 2009, Richard co-founded The Equality Trust. Richard was awarded a 2013 Silver Rose Award from Solidar for championing equality and the 2014 Charles Cully Memorial Medal by the Irish Cancer Society.

He is best known for his book with Kate Pickett The Spirit Level, first published in 2009, which argues that societies with more equal distribution of incomes have better health, fewer social problems such as violence, drug abuse, teenage births, mental illness, obesity, and others, and are more cohesive than ones in which the gap between the rich and poor is greater.

== Education ==
Richard Wilkinson was educated at Leighton Park School and Reading Technical College. He studied economic history at the London School of Economics. He then earned a Master's degree at the University of Pennsylvania. His University of Nottingham Master's of Medical Science thesis was "Socio-economic Factors in Mortality Differentials" (1976).

== Career ==
Wilkinson's first book, Poverty and Progress was published by Methuen in 1973. He was a research student on a Health Education Council fellowship at the Department of Community Health, University of Nottingham and spent a year on a large-scale computer analysis of the possible causes of different health outcomes and social strata.

On 16 December 1976, his article entitled 'Dear David Ennals' was published in New Society; at that time, David Ennals was Secretary of State for Social Services. The article led eventually to the 1980 publication of the Black Report on Inequalities in Health. He was also Senior Research Fellow at the Trafford Centre for Medical Research of the University of Sussex in 2001.

From 1976 onwards his career focused on research into social class differences in health, the social determinants of health, and on the health and social effects of income inequality. He has authored hundreds of research articles, chapters and books, several with his colleague and partner, Kate Pickett. He received the Solidar's Silver Rose Award in 2013, Community Access Unlimited's Humanitarian award in 2013, the Irish Cancer Society's Charles Cully Memorial medal in 2014, and was The Australian Society for Medical Research's medallist in 2017.

Wilkinson retired from his post as a professor of social epidemiology at the University of Nottingham in 2008. He was awarded the title of Emeritus Professor. He is also Honorary Professor at University College London. In 2009 Richard Wilkinson and Kate Pickett founded the Equality Trust, which seeks to explain the benefits of a more equal society and campaigns for greater income equality.

== Politics ==
In August 2015, Wilkinson endorsed Jeremy Corbyn's campaign in the Labour Party leadership election.

== Personal life ==
Richard Wilkinson and Kate Pickett, the authors of The Spirit Level: Why More Equal Societies Almost Always Do Better, are a couple.

== Publications ==
=== Books ===
- Wilkinson, Richard G. (1973). Poverty and progress: an ecological model of economic development. London: Methuen. ISBN 9780416776003.
- Wilkinson, Richard G. (1986). Class and health: research and longitudinal data. London New York: Tavistock Publications. ISBN 9780422603607.
- Wilkinson, Richard G.; Quick, Allison (1991). Income and health. London: Socialist Health Association. ISBN 9780900687174.

Introduction Chapter 1: The evidence Chapter 2: Inequalities in health Chapter 3: How income affects health Chapter 4: Public health policies for the future Chapter 5: Reforming social security Chapter 6: Reforming taxation Endnote Associated conference, November 1992

- Wilkinson, Richard G. (1994). Unfair shares: the effects of widening income differences on the welfare of the young. Ilford: Barnardos. ISBN 9780902046160.
- Wilkinson, Richard G.; Blane, David; Brunner, Eric (1996). Health and social organization: towards a health policy for the twenty-first century. London New York: Routledge. ISBN 9780415130707.
- Wilkinson, Richard (1996). Unhealthy societies: the afflictions of inequality. London New York: Routledge. ISBN 9780415092357.
- Wilkinson, Richard G.; Kawachi, Ichirō; Kennedy, Bruce P. (1999). The society and population health reader (volume 1). New York: New Press Distributed by W.W. Norton. ISBN 9781565845268.
- Wilkinson, Richard G.; Marmot, Michael (2006) [1999]. Social determinants of health (2nd ed.). Oxford New York: Oxford University Press. ISBN 9780198565895.
- Wilkinson, Richard G. (2001). Mind the gap: hierarchies, health and human evolution. Darwinism Today. New Haven: Yale University Press. ISBN 9780300089530.
- Wilkinson, Richard G.; Marmot, Michael (2003). The solid facts. Copenhagen: World Health Organization, Regional Office for Europe. ISBN 9780585492520.
- Wilkinson, Richard G. (2005). The impact of inequality: how to make sick societies healthier. London: Routledge. ISBN 9780415372695.
- Wilkinson, Richard G.; Pickett, Kate E. (2008). Health and inequality: Major themes in health and social welfare. Abingdon, Oxon, UK New York City: Routledge. ISBN 9780415443135. Four volume set.

Contents:

volume 1. Health inequalities: the evidence
volume 2. Health inequalities: causes and pathways
volume 3. Health inequalities : interventions and evaluations
volume 4. The political, social and biological ecology of health

- Wilkinson, Richard G.; Pickett, Kate E. (2009). The spirit level: why more equal societies almost always do better. London: Allen Lane. ISBN 9781846140396.
  - Adapted as the 2016 documentary film The Divide. Wilkinson and Pickett each appear as commentators.
- Wilkinson, Richard G.; Pickett, Kate E. (2019). The Inner Level: How More Equal Societies Reduce Stress, Restore Sanity and Improve Everyone's Well-Being. Penguin Press. ISBN 9780525561224.

=== Articles and papers ===
- Wilkinson, Richard G. (1984). Health, economic structure and social indicators. London: Centre for Economic Policy Research. OCLC 12722221. Discussion paper 17.
- Wilkinson, Richard G. (2002). Germany, Britain & the coming of War in 1914. History Review. Issue 42 March 2002
- Wilkinson, Richard G.; Pickett, Kate E. (24 November 2007). "Child wellbeing and income inequality in rich societies: ecological cross sectional study". British Medical Journal. 335 (7629): 1080. doi:10.1136/bmj.39377.580162.55. PMC 2094139. PMID 18024483.

=== Other ===
- Further journal articles listed and some downloadable at Scientific Commons
- Some further titles are listed here.
- 2008 Eve Saville Memorial Lecture: "Inequality: The obstacle between us", at the Centre for Crime and Justice Studies at King's College London School of Law.
- Appearance in 2011 documentary, "Zeitgeist: Moving Forward" on YouTube
