= Kate Pickett =

British epidemiologist

Kate Pickett OBE FFPH FAcSS FRSA
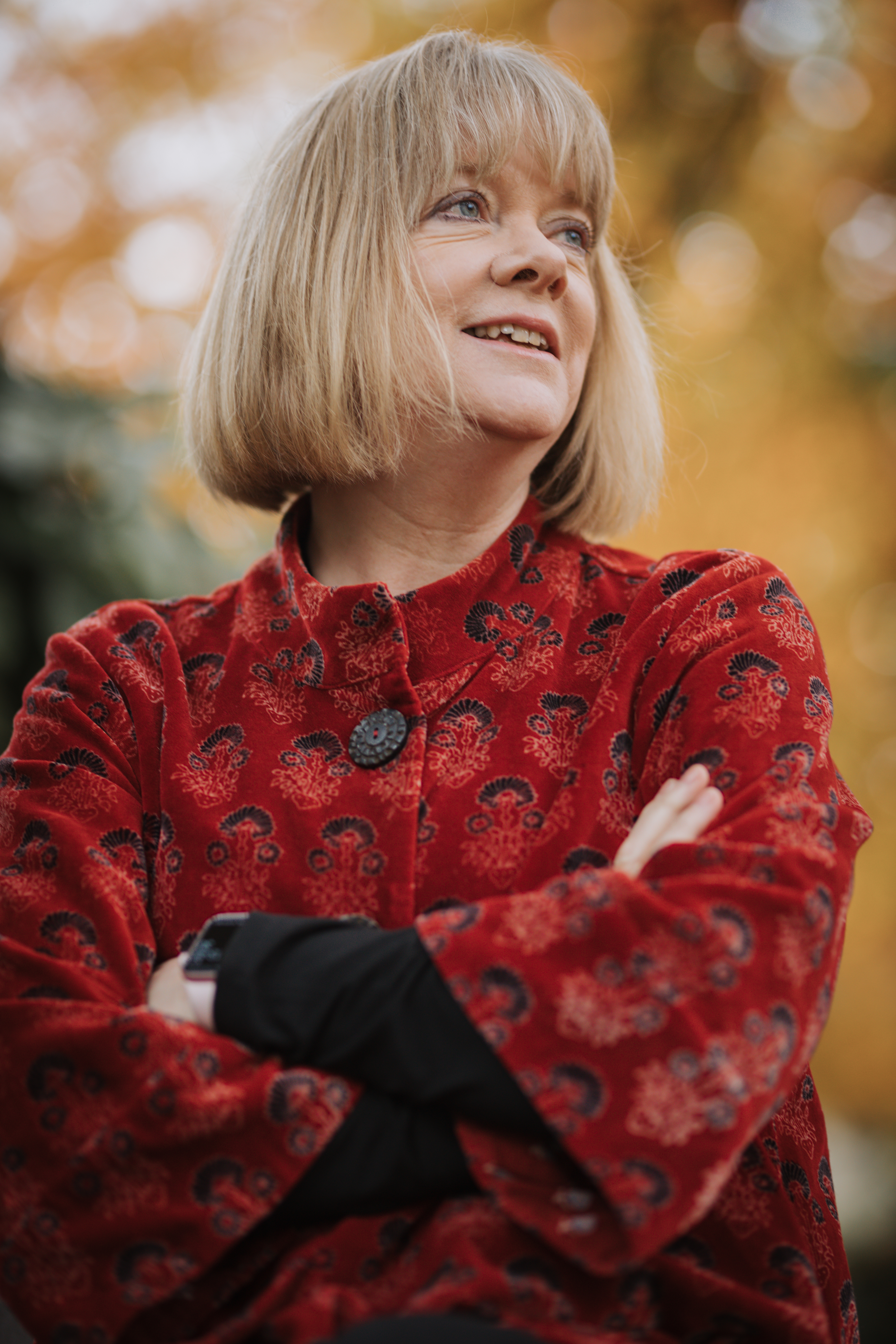
- Kate Pickett in 2024
- Born: 1965 (age 60–61)
- Education: University of Cambridge; Cornell University; University of California, Berkeley
- Known for: Commissioner for the York Fairness Commission
- Awards: Silver Rose Award, Solidar; Charles Cully Memorial Medal, Irish Cancer Society
- Scientific career
- Fields: Epidemiology
- Workplaces: University of York

Kate Elizabeth Pickett (born 1965) is a British epidemiologist and political activist who is Professor of Epidemiology in the Department of Health Sciences at the University of York, and was a National Institute for Health and Care Research Career Scientist from 2007 to 2012. She co-authored (with Richard G. Wilkinson) The Spirit Level: Why More Equal Societies Almost Always Do Better and is a co-founder of The Equality Trust. Pickett was awarded a 2013 Silver Rose Award from Solidar for championing equality and the 2014 Charles Cully Memorial Medal by the Irish Cancer Society.

== Career ==
Pickett was a commissioner for the York Fairness Commission and a commissioner for the Living Wage Commission. She serves on the Scientific Council of Inequality Watch and the Scientific Board of Progressive Economy, and is a member of the Human Capital Research Working Group of the Institute for New Economic Thinking. She is on the Steering Committee of the Alliance for Sustainability and Prosperity.

== Background ==
Pickett trained in biological anthropology at Robinson College, Cambridge, nutritional science at Cornell University and epidemiology at the University of California Berkeley, where she received the Warren Winkelstein award for epidemiology. She is a Fellow of the Royal Society of Arts and a Fellow of the UK Faculty of Public Health.

== Research ==
One programme of research focuses on the social determinants of health, including the influences of such factors as social class, income inequality, neighbourhood context and ethnic density on such varied outcomes as mortality and morbidity, teenage birth, obesity, Sudden Infant Death Syndrome and health-related behaviours. A second research agenda focuses on smoking in pregnancy, its causal role in relation to behavioural problems in children and its psychosocial context.

== Politics ==
In August 2015, Pickett endorsed Jeremy Corbyn's campaign in the Labour Party leadership election.

== Honours ==
Pickett was appointed Officer of the Order of the British Empire (OBE) in the 2023 New Year Honours for services to societal equality.

== Selected bibliography ==
=== Books ===
- Pickett, Kate; Wilkinson, Richard G. (2008). Health and inequality: Major themes in health and social welfare. Abingdon, Oxon, UK New York, New York: Routledge. ISBN 9780415443135.
- Pickett, Kate; Wilkinson, Richard G. (2009). The spirit level: why more equal societies almost always do better. London: Allen Lane. ISBN 9781846140396.
  - Adapted as the 2016 documentary film The Divide. Picket and Wilkinson each appear as commentators.
- Wilkinson, Richard G.; Pickett, Kate E. (2019). The Inner Level: How More Equal Societies Reduce Stress, Restore Sanity and Improve Everyone's Well-Being. Penguin Press. ISBN 9780525561224.

=== Journal articles ===
- Pickett, Kate; Wilkinson, Richard G. (24 November 2007). "Child wellbeing and income inequality in rich societies: ecological cross sectional study". British Medical Journal. 335 (7629). BMJ: 1080. doi:10.1136/bmj.39377.580162.55. PMC 2094139. PMID 18024483.
