= 1949 in literature =

This article contains information about the literary events and publications of 1949.

== Events ==
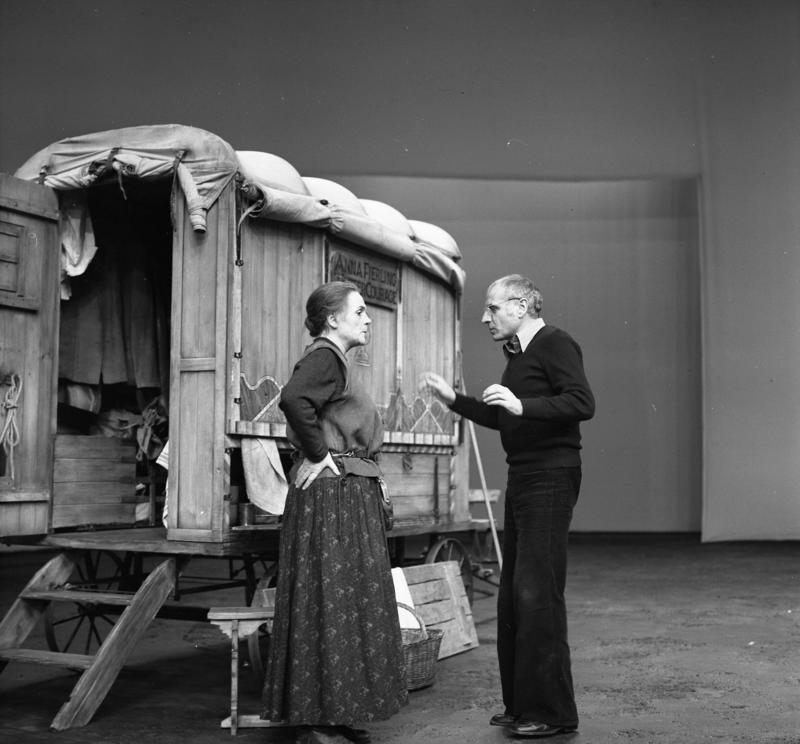
Gisela May and Manfred Wekwerth during rehearsals of a 1978 production of Mother Courage and Her Children

- January 11 – Bertolt Brecht's play Mother Courage and Her Children (Mutter Courage und ihre Kinder), 1939, is first performed in Germany, at the Deutsches Theater in East Berlin, with his wife Helene Weigel in the title role and staged with his Verfremdungseffekt ("distancing effect"). This marks the origin of the Berliner Ensemble.
- January 19 – The Poe Toaster first appears, at the grave of Edgar Allan Poe.
- January 31 – Late Night Serial, a pilot for the U.K. radio series Book at Bedtime, begins on the BBC Light Programme with a reading of John Buchan's novel The Three Hostages.
- February – Théâtre du Rideau Vert, the first professional French-language theatre in Canada, gives its first performance.
- February 10 – Arthur Miller's tragedy Death of a Salesman opens at the Morosco Theatre on Broadway in New York City with Lee J. Cobb in the title rôle of Willy Loman. It will run for 742 performances.
- February 19 – Ezra Pound is awarded the first Bollingen Prize in poetry, by the Bollingen Foundation and Yale University.
- March – Poet Pablo Neruda flees Chile over the Lilpela Pass through the Andes to Argentina on horseback carrying a manuscript of his Canto General.
- April 14
  - Roy Campbell punches Stephen Spender on the nose at a poetry reading in London.
  - N'Ko alphabet devised by Solomana Kante as a writing system and literary language for the Manding languages of West Africa.
- May – Welsh poet Dylan Thomas and his wife Caitlin settle at the Boat House, Laugharne, in South Wales.
- June 8 – George Orwell's dystopian novel Nineteen Eighty-Four is published in London by Secker & Warburg.
- June
  - Oxford University Dramatic Society production of Shakespeare's The Tempest beside Worcester College lake, directed by Nevill Coghill.
  - The final part of Jean-Paul Sartre's Les Chemins de la Liberté (The Roads to Freedom) trilogy is published. A projected fourth volume is never completed.
- Summer
  - The first Cheltenham Literature Festival is held in England, so making it the longest-running event of its kind in the world.
  - Street & Smith ceases to publish its pulp magazines in the United States.
- September 26 – Samuel Putnam publishes his new translation of Don Quixote, the first in contemporary English. It is instantly acclaimed and is still in print as of 2008.
- October – Publication begins in Italy of L'inferno di Topolino, a graphic parody of Dante's Inferno featuring Mickey Mouse with text and verse by Guido Martina.
- October 5 – American writer Helene Hanff writes her first letter from New York City to the London antiquarian book dealers Marks & Co, a correspondence eventually collected as 84, Charing Cross Road.
- October 13 – George Orwell marries Sonia Brownell while confined in University College Hospital, London, where he will die three months later.
- unknown dates
  - Arthur C. Clarke becomes an assistant editor of Science Abstracts.
  - Radclyffe Hall's lesbian novel The Well of Loneliness, convicted of obscenity in the United Kingdom on first publication in 1928, is republished in the UK posthumously by Falcon Press, with no legal challenge made against it.
  - A statue of the folk poet Larin Paraske is erected in Helsinki.
  - Enid Blyton's children's books – Noddy Goes to Toyland, the first to introduce the title character, and The Secret Seven, first in the eponymous series – are published in the UK.

== New books ==
=== Fiction ===
- Ilse Aichinger – "Spiegelgeschichte" (Mirror Story, serialized short story)
- Nelson Algren – The Man with the Golden Arm
- Miguel Ángel Asturias – Men of Maize (Hombres de maíz)
- Nigel Balchin – A Sort of Traitors
- Antoine Blondin – L'Europe buissonnière (Europe Playing Truant)
- Heinrich Böll – The Train Was on Time (Der Zug war pünktlich)
- Jorge Luis Borges – The Aleph (El Aleph), short stories
- Paul Bowles – The Sheltering Sky
- Fredric Brown – The Screaming Mimi
- Italo Calvino – The Crow Comes Last (Ultimo viene il corvo), short stories
- Victor Canning – The Golden Salamander
- Alejo Carpentier – The Kingdom of this World (El reino de este mundo)
- John Dickson Carr
  - Below Suspicion
  - A Graveyard To Let (as Carter Dickson)
- Max Catto – The Flanagan Boy
- Peter Cheyney
  - One of Those Things
  - You Can Call It a Day
- Agatha Christie – Crooked House
- Howard Clewes – Green Grow the Rushes
- Freeman Wills Crofts – Silence for the Murderer
- Cecil Day-Lewis – Head of a Traveller
- R. F. Delderfield – Seven Men of Gascony
- H. F. Ellis – The Papers of A. J. Wentworth B.A.
- Foster Fitzsimmons – Bright Leaf
- Anthony Gilbert – Death Knocks Three Times
- Winston Graham – Cordelia
- Graham Greene – The Third Man
- A. B. Guthrie, Jr. – The Way West
- Knut Hamsun – On Overgrown Paths (Paa gjengrodde Stier)
- Cyril Hare – When the Wind Blows
- L. P. Hartley – The Boat
- John Hawkes – Cannibal
- Alfred Hayes – The Girl on the Via Flaminia
- William Heinesen – The Black Cauldron (Den sorte gryde)
- Georgette Heyer – Arabella
- George L. Howe – Call It Treason
- Hammond Innes – The White South
- Shirley Jackson – The Lottery and Other Stories
- Alaric Jacob – Scenes from a Bourgeois Life
- Dagmar Lange – Mördaren ljuger inte ensam (The Murderer is Not the Only Liar)
- Marghanita Laski – Little Boy Lost
- E. C. R. Lorac
  - Policemen in the Precinct
  - Still Waters
- H. P. Lovecraft – Something About Cats and Other Pieces
- Ross Macdonald – The Moving Target
- Ngaio Marsh – Swing Brother Swing
- Ana María Matute – Luciérnagas
- Robert Merle – Week-end at Zuydcoote (Week-end à Zuydcoote)
- Yukio Mishima (三島 由紀夫) – Confessions of a Mask (仮面の告白)
- Gladys Mitchell – Tom Brown's Body
- Nancy Mitford – Love in a Cold Climate
- Vilhelm Moberg – The Emigrants (Utvandrarna), first in The Emigrants (novel series)
- C. L. Moore – Beyond Earth's Gates
- Charles Morgan – The River Line
- Stratis Myrivilis – Η Παναγιά η Γοργόνα (E Panayia e Yoryona, The Mermaid Madonna)
- Máirtín Ó Cadhain – Cré na Cille (Graveyard Clay)
- John O'Hara – A Rage to Live
- George Orwell – Nineteen Eighty-Four
- Karel Poláček – There Were Five of Us (Bylo nás pět)
- Samuel Putnam (translator) – Don Quixote
- Ellery Queen – Cat of Many Tails
- Harold Robbins – The Dream Merchants
- Rafael Sabatini – The Gamester
- Jack Schaefer – Shane
- Anna Seghers – The Dead Stay Young (Die Toten Bleiben Jung)
- Nevil Shute – A Town Like Alice
- Rex Stout
  - The Second Confession
  - Trouble in Triplicate
- Cecil Street
  - Blackthorn House
  - Up the Garden Path
- Edward Streeter – Father of the Bride
- Julian Symons – Bland Beginning
- Gwyn Thomas – All Things Betray Thee
- Gerald Verner – The Whispering Woman
- Arved Viirlaid – Tormiaasta (The Year of Storms)
- Mika Waltari – The Wanderer (Mikael Hakim)
- Jiří Weil – Life With a Star (Život s hvězdou)
- Paul Winterton – Came the Dawn
- S. Fowler Wright – The Throne of Saturn (short stories)
- Frank Yerby – Pride's Castle

=== Children and young people ===
- Marguerite de Angeli – The Door in the Wall
- Rev. W. Awdry – Tank Engine Thomas Again (fourth in The Railway Series of 42 books by him and his son Christopher Awdry)
- Carl Barks – Lost in the Andes! (comic-book story starring Donald Duck)
- Enid Blyton
  - Noddy Goes to Toyland
  - The Secret Seven
  - The Rockingdown Mystery
- Ruby Ferguson – Jill's Gymkhana (first in Jill series of nine books)
- Robert A. Heinlein – "Red Planet"
- Erich Kästner – The Parent Trap (Das doppelte Lottchen)
- Astrid Lindgren – Most Beloved Sister (Allrakäraste syster) (in Nils Karlsson-Pyssling: sagor)
- Clare Mallory – Juliet Overseas
- [Rona Munro] – Janet and John (first in the series of early readers)
- Ruth Park – Poor Man's Orange
- Willard Price – Amazon Adventure (first in The Adventure Series)
- H. E. Todd – Bobby Brewster and the Winkers' Club (first in the Bobby Brewster series of 24 books)
- Geoffrey Trease – No Boats on Bannermere (first in a series of five set in Cumberland)
- Meriol Trevor – The Forest and the Kingdom (first in World Dionysius trilogy)

=== Drama ===
- Ugo Betti – Corruzione al Palazzo di giustizia (Corruption in the Palace of Justice, written 1944, first performed)
- Maurice Clavel – La Terrasse de midi
- T. S. Eliot – The Cocktail Party
- Christopher Fry – The Lady's Not for Burning
- Jean Genet – Deathwatch (Haute Surveillance)
- Val Gielgud – Party Manners
- Hugh Hastings – Seagulls Over Sorrento
- Ronald Jeans – Young Wives' Tale
- Sidney Kingsley – Detective Story
- Eric Linklater – Love in Albania
- Alan Melville
  - Castle in the Air
  - Top Secret
- Arthur Miller – Death of a Salesman
- Pablo Picasso – The Four Little Girls (Les Quatre petites filles), first published version
- Lynn Riggs – Out of Dust
- Nelson Rodrigues – Dorotéia
- Talbot Rothwell – Queen Elizabeth Slept Here
- Aimée Stuart – Lace on Her Petticoat

=== Poetry ===
- Carlos de Oliveira – Descida aos Infernos
- Robert Frost – Complete Poems of Robert Frost
- Máirtín Ó Direáin – Rogha Dánta
- Octavio Paz – Libertad bajo palabra

=== Non-fiction ===
- Marc Bloch – Apologie pour l'histoire, ou, Métier d'historien (translated as The Historian's Craft, 1953)
- Fernand Braudel – La Méditerranée et le monde Méditerranéen à l'époque de Philippe II (The Mediterranean and the Mediterranean World in the Age of Philip II)
- Herbert Butterfield
  - Christianity and History
  - Origins of Modern Science
- Joseph Campbell – The Hero with a Thousand Faces
- John Dickson Carr – The Life of Sir Arthur Conan Doyle
- Thomas B. Costain – The Conquering Family (also The Conquerors, first book in Plantagenet Series)
- Simone de Beauvoir – The Second Sex (Le Deuxième Sexe)
- Dion Fortune (died 1946) – The Cosmic Doctrine
- Benjamin Graham – The Intelligent Investor
- John Gunther – Death Be Not Proud
- Jean Hugard and Frederick Braue – The Royal Road To Card Magic
- John Maynard Keynes (died 1946) – Two Memoirs
- Osbert Lancaster – Drayneflete Revealed (architectural satire)
- Aldo Leopold – A Sand County Almanac
- Margaret Mead – Male and Female
- Robert Michels – Political Parties (Zür Soziologie des Parteiwesens in der modernen Demokratie, 2nd ed., 1925)
- Audie Murphy – To Hell and Back
- P. D. Ouspensky – In Search of the Miraculous
- Amber Reeves – Ethics for Unbelievers
- Finn Ronne – Antarctic Conquest
- Gilbert Ryle – The Concept of Mind
- Robert Lewis Taylor – W. C. Fields: His Follies and Fortunes
- Max Weber – The Methodology of the Social Sciences

== Births ==
- January 1
  - Olivia Goldsmith, American author (died 2004)
  - Radu Țuculescu, Romanian novelist, dramatist and theater director
- January 12 – Haruki Murakami (村上 春樹), Japanese novelist
- January 16 – John Guy, Australian-born British historian and biographer
- January 26 – Jonathan Carroll, American author of fantasy fiction
- January 27 – Ethan Mordden, American author
- February 4 – Mark D. Devlin, American memoirist (died 2005)
- February 23 – César Aira, Argentinian writer
- March 22 – Brian Hanrahan, English journalist (died 2010)
- March 26 – Patrick Süskind, German novelist
- April 11 – Dorothy Allison, American novelist and campaigner
- April 25 – James Fenton, English journalist, poet, critic and academic
- May 25 – Jamaica Kincaid, Antiguan-born novelist
- June 5 – Ken Follett, English novelist
- June 14 – Harry Turtledove, American novelist
- June 21 – John Agard, Guyanese poet
- July 1 – Denis Johnson, American poet, novelist (Tree of Smoke) and short story writer ("Jesus' Son") (died 2017)
- July 5 – Jill Murphy, English children's writer and illustrator (died 2021)
- July 15 – Richard Russo, American Pulitzer Prize-winning novelist
- August 3 – Peter Gutmann, American journalist
- August 9 – Slavko Ćuruvija, Serbian journalist and newspaper publisher (died 1999)
- August 17 – Julian Fellowes, English novelist and screenwriter
- August 25 – Martin Amis, English novelist and critic (died 2023)
- September 10 – Bill O'Reilly, American political journalist and author
- September 13 – Linda Colley, English historian
- September 19 – Jimmy McGovern, English screenwriter
- September 26
  - Jane Smiley, American novelist
  - Minette Walters, English crime fiction writer
- October 4 – Luis Sepúlveda, Chilean author and journalist (died 2020)
- October 5 – Peter Ackroyd, English biographer, novelist and critic
- November 2 – Lois McMaster Bujold, American author of science fiction and fantasy
- November 24 – Erwin Neutzsky-Wulff, Danish philosopher
- December 6 – Élmer Mendoza, Mexican fiction writer
- December 9 – Eileen Myles, American poet
- December 22 – David Gilmour, Canadian novelist
- December 24 – Alberto Pérez-Gómez, Mexican-born architectural historian

== Deaths ==
- January 15 – Mary Lewis Langworthy, American pageant writer (born 1872)
- January 21 – William Price Drury, English novelist, playwright and officer (born 1861)
- February 1 – N. D. Cocea, Romanian novelist, critic and journalist (born 1880)
- February 11 – Axel Munthe, Swedish autobiographer and psychiatrist (born 1857)
- March 2 – Sarojini Naidu, Indian poet and politician (born 1879)
- May 6 – Maurice Maeterlinck, Belgian poet, playwright and Nobel Laureate (born 1862)
- May 21 – Klaus Mann, German-born American novelist (overdose, born 1906)
- June 10 – Sigrid Undset, Norwegian author and Nobel Laureate (born 1882)
- June 11 – Oton Župančič, Slovene poet, translator and dramatist (born 1878)
- June 14 – Russell Doubleday, American author and publisher (born 1872)
- July 2 – Elsa Bernstein (Ernst Rosmer), German dramatist (born 1866)
- August 2 – Hermann Grab, Bohemian German-language novelist (born 1903)
- August 8 – E. H. Young, English novelist (born 1880)
- August 16 – Margaret Mitchell, American novelist (road accident, born 1900)
- September 4 – Herbert Eulenberg, German poet and dramatist (born 1876)
- September 6 – Lucien Descaves, French novelist (born 1861)
- September 19
  - Will Cuppy, American humorist (born 1884)
  - George Shiels, Irish dramatist (born 1881)
- September 21 – Jorge Cáceres, Chilean poet and artist (born 1923)
- October 20 – Jacques Copeau, French actor and dramatist (born 1879)
- October 24
  - Thomas Rowland Hughes, Welsh-language novelist, dramatist and poet (multiple sclerosis, born 1903)
  - Yaroslav Halan, Ukrainian playwright, translator, and publicist (homicide, born 1902)
- December 7 – Rex Beach, American author (born 1877)
- December 12 – Harriet Ford, American actress and playwright (born 1863)
- December 28 – Hervey Allen, American novelist (heart attack, born 1889)

== Awards ==
- Carnegie Medal for children's literature: Agnes Allen, The Story of Your Home
- James Tait Black Memorial Prize for fiction: Emma Smith, The Far Cry
- James Tait Black Memorial Prize for biography: John Connell, W. E. Henley
- Newbery Medal for children's literature: Marguerite Henry, King of the Wind
- Nobel Prize in Literature: William Faulkner
- Order of Merit: Bertrand Russell
- Premio Nadal: Jose Suárez Carreño, Las últimas horas
- Pulitzer Prize for Drama: Arthur Miller, Death of a Salesman
- Pulitzer Prize for Fiction: James Gould Cozzens, Guard of Honor
- Pulitzer Prize for Poetry: Peter Viereck, Terror and Decorum
