= Cue for Treason =

1940 novel by Geoffrey Trease

- First US edition (publ. Vanguard Press, 1941)
- Author: Geoffrey Trease
- Language: English
- Genre: Historical fiction/Adventure
- Publisher: Blackwell (UK); Copp Clark (Canada)
- Publication date: 1940

Cue for Treason (1940) is a children's historical novel written by Geoffrey Trease and is his best-known work. The novel is set in Elizabethan England at the end of the 16th century. (Note: It has been claimed that the action can be dated to 1599 from the reference to Henry V and Essex being sent to Ireland, but it is not clear that the author intended to be that specific. However it is clearly set some time between the Spanish Armada in 1588 and the death of Elizabeth in 1603.) Two young runaways become boy actors, at first on the road and later in London, where they are befriended by William Shakespeare. They become aware of a plot against Queen Elizabeth's life and attempt to prevent it.

== Plot summary ==
Peter Brownrigg, a 14-year-old boy who lives in Cumberland in the north of England, is involved in a night crime against the theft of his village's farmland by Sir Philip Morton. He leaves his village to escape prosecution for throwing a rock at Sir Philip Morton. He first goes to Penrith but unexpectedly encounters Sir Philip at a performance of Richard III by a touring playing company. He hides from him in a prop coffin (supposed to contain the body of King Henry VI), which is later carried onto the company's cart.

The players discover Peter hiding, and the kindly Desmonds, who run the playing company, take him on as a boy actor. Another boy, Kit Kirkstone, also joins the company.

Kit proves excellent at playing female roles while Peter acts as an understudy. After Peter's jealousy leads to a fight, he discovers Kit's secret. Kit is a girl in disguise, really called Katharine Russell, who is running away to avoid a forced marriage to Sir Philip, who is only interested in her inheritance.

The company breaks up, and the Desmonds promise to take Peter and Kit to a London theatre company. During their trip to London, Mr. Desmond breaks his leg in a river accident, and Kit almost reveals her true identity to a crowd of observers after swimming down the river to rescue Mr. Desmond, but Peter distracts everyone and saves her. Because of the results of Mr. Desmond's accident, Peter and Kit carry on their journey alone. When they arrive in London, they audition for Richard Burbage of the Lord Chamberlain's Men at The Theatre in Shoreditch, a neighborhood beyond the northern boundary of the City of London and outside of the jurisdiction of its civil authorities – and consequently an area notorious for licentious behaviour and gaming houses. After being initially turned away by Burbage, they are accepted as apprentices by the playwright William Shakespeare, who recognises Kit's acting ability and Peter's gift of mimicry. They perform in various plays and see Sir Philip in the audience during Romeo and Juliet.

Peter's copy of Shakespeare's new play, Henry V, is stolen by the "Yellow Gentleman", and Kit and Peter worry that he plans to profit from the unpublished play. While stealing back the script, Peter overhears a discussion between the thief and another man, sounding very treasonous. He also notices an odd poem written on the script. They realise that some of the poem must be part of a code, but have no idea how to decipher it.

Peter and Kit bring the poem to the Queen's secret service, who decipher the poorly written sonnet and reveal that the first letter of each line spells out “SEND NEWS BY PEEL.” Peter associates this message with Sir Philip's old peel tower. Peter and Kit set off with Tom Boyd, a member of the Queen's Secret Service. They travel back to Peter's village in disguise to see if Peter's theory about Sir Philip's peel tower is true. Tom is killed by the conspirators and Peter is captured but not before learning that John Somers, an actor in their company, is to shoot the Queen during the first performance of Henry V. This is part of a wider conspiracy to install a new regime in England, the rest of it is vague but they are evidently in league with Spain. Peter is taken for questioning to a deserted Ullswater islet, but manages to knock out the guard. He swims to the mainland and narrowly escapes across the fells.

Kit and Peter go to a local magistrate, but discover he is a part of the treasonous plan. They steal his horses, which are of exceptional quality, intending to ride to London to warn the Queen. Sir Philip and his associates give chase. On the road to London, they are robbed of their horses; however, this is an unseen blessing because just then Sir Philip and his associates catch up and give chase to the horse thieves, thinking they are Peter and Kit. After continuing on foot, they meet Desmond and the rest of the company, who are rehearsing Edward II. On hearing of the conspiracy, Desmond vows to stop Sir Philip.

Knowing it is only a matter of time before Sir Philip realises his error and returns, the actors dress up in their soldier costumes and rig the horses to sound like an army ready to attack, with trumpets and drums behind. Kit and Peter pretend to be captives to make Sir Philip dismount. Sir Philip is fooled by the group's acting, and he and his followers are then taken into custody by Desmond's men. Kit and Peter make a desperate dash back to London, and John Somers is captured by guards moments before he can shoot the Queen. Kit and Peter meet the Queen and tell her of their adventures.

In the last paragraph, Peter finishes writing the story, and we learn that he and Kit are now married with sons and are living in a lakeside house in Cumberland, which is Kit's inherited estate.

== Characters ==
- Peter Brownrigg – Narrator and protagonist. 14-year-old Cumberland boy, Kit's friend. Peter is a very adventurous boy who can't stay out of trouble. Wanted by Sir Philip Morton
- Kit Kirkstone (Note: This pseudonym is taken from the Kirkstone Pass.) – Protagonist. 13-year-old runaway girl, real name Katharine Russell, Peter's friend
- Sir Philip Morton – Antagonist. Ruthless landlord and conspiracy leader
- The Yellow Gentleman (Sir David Vicars) – Playhouse pirate and part of the plot to kill the Queen.
- Mr Desmond – Actor
- Mrs Desmond – Mr Desmond's wife
- Anthony Duncan – Conspirator
- John Somers – Actor, conspirator, assassin
- Tom Boyd – Secret agent
- Sir Joseph Williams – Counselor of Queen Elizabeth

Historical characters

- Mr Burbage – Actor and owner of the Globe Theatre in London
- William Shakespeare – Playwright and actor
- Sir Robert Cecil – Government minister and head of the Queen's Secret Service
- Sir Francis Bacon – Philosopher, statesman and essayist; cousin of Sir Robert Cecil
- Queen Elizabeth I of England- Ruler of England and targeted to be killed by the conspirators.

== Significance of work ==
Cue for Treason was not Trease's first novel, as he had already written a few other children's novels, notably Bows Against the Barons and Comrades for the Charter, where he showed a strong streak of political radicalism.

However, Cue for Treason was written fairly early in his writing career and was, in a sense, his definitive work. As well as being his best-known, it has been described as creating the template on which he wrote many of his later novels. In particular, he has as his central character an adolescent male who meets an adolescent female who proves a strong character in her own right. He also employs some plot devices which he sometimes used in his later works, e.g. the heroine spends a large part of the story disguised as a boy, and to advance the plot, the hero happens to overhear the villains talking. However, although in this case the hero and heroine marry at the end, he avoids this obvious ending in some of his later novels (e.g. The Hills of Varna, which otherwise shows some similarity to Cue for Treason).

The novel is marked by a strong sense of place, particularly showing Trease's love of the Lake District, where he also set his Bannerdale stories, including No Boats on Bannermere.

The politics of the Elizabethan era are mentioned in the novel: social concerns over enclosures and unemployment, and the state matters of rebellion and invasion. Forced marriage and the exclusion of women from the drama are touched upon. The values of patriotism, loyalty and independence are stressed. The motives of the conspirators are not examined, being assumed to be simply wealth and power; although historically, religion would have been a factor, this is not mentioned beyond a casual reference to "old ways".

The English Renaissance theatre is represented by its two extremes: a poor temporary company which tours around England, and the Lord Chamberlain's Men, who perform for the Queen and her court.

There is a stage adaptation by Peter Craig.
