= Țuculescu =

Țuculescu is a Romanian surname. Notable people with the surname include:

- Ion Țuculescu (1910–1962), Romanian artist
- Radu Țuculescu (1949–2025), Romanian novelist
