= Charles (short story) =

1948 short story by Shirley Jackson

- Short story by Shirley Jackson
- Language: English

Publication
- Published in: July 1948

"Charles" is a short story by Shirley Jackson, first published in Mademoiselle in July 1948. It was later included in her 1949 collection, The Lottery and Other Stories, and her 1953 novel, Life Among the Savages.

== Plot summary ==
A mother laments that her son, Laurie, is growing up as he begins attending kindergarten. She notes changes in his behavior: He does not want to wear corduroy overalls anymore, no longer waves goodbye to her, slams the door when he comes home, and speaks insolently to his father. During lunchtime conversations, Laurie begins telling his parents about an ill-behaved boy in his class named Charles, who frequently misbehaves. Though fascinated by the boy, the mother wonders if Charles' bad influence is responsible for Laurie misbehaving. On some days, Laurie arrives home late and says that the teacher kept the whole class after school as a result of Charles' behavior. Over the ensuing weeks, Charles seems to be getting worse until one day, Laurie tells his parents that Charles behaved himself and the teacher made him her helper. By the end of the week, however, Charles has reverted to his old self when he makes a girl in his class say a profane word to the teacher. The next school day, Charles says the word several times and throws chalk. As a punishment for using the profane word, a bar of soap was put in his mouth.

When the next PTA meeting comes around, Laurie's mother is determined to meet Charles' mother. She closely examines the other parents and sees nothing but pleasant faces and is surprised when Charles is not mentioned at all. After the meeting, she approaches the teacher and introduces herself as Laurie's mother. The teacher says that Laurie "had a little trouble adjusting...but now he's a fine little helper. With occasional lapses, of course." Laurie's mother then mentions Charles, but the teacher tells her that there is no one in the class named Charles.

== Interpretations ==
The most common interpretation of "Charles" is that Laurie is Charles, and simply created the character to explain why he stayed late after school. The mother, however, is unable to recognize the bad behavior of her own son. Ruth Franklin, in Shirley Jackson: A Rather Haunted Life, notes that an alternative interpretation is that Charles is a supernatural being that only Laurie can see.

== Legacy ==
The story continues to be taught in schools, and is Jackson's second best-known short story, after "The Lottery".
