= Life Among the Savages =

Book by Shirley Jackson

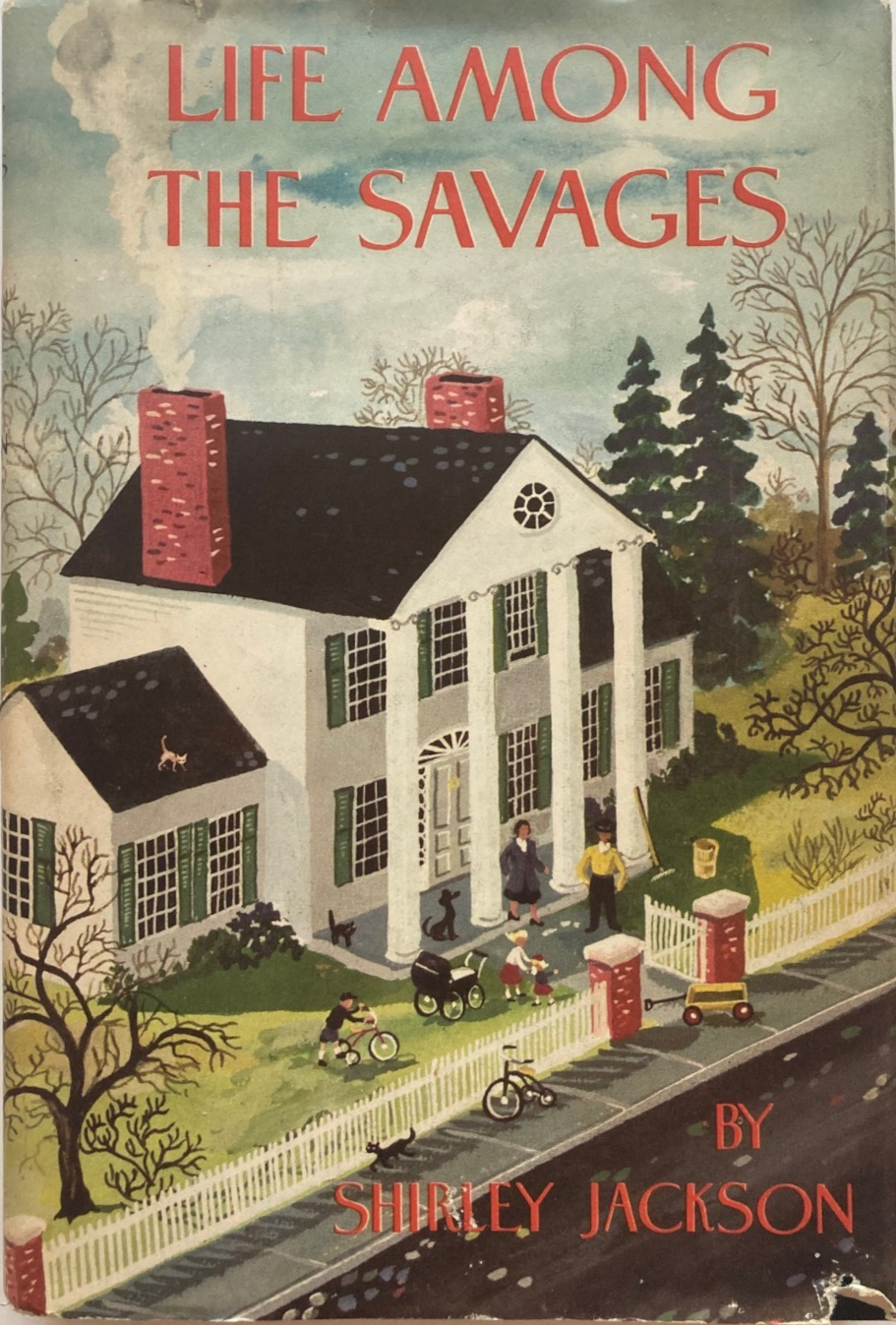
- Cover of the first edition (published by Farrar, Straus and Young)
- Author: Shirley Jackson
- Release number: 1st in series
- Genre: Memoir
- Publisher: Farrar, Straus and Young (1953), Penguin Books (2015)
- Publication date: June 1953
- Pages: 241
- ISBN: 978-0-14-312804-5 (2015 edition)
- Followed by: Raising Demons

Life Among the Savages is a 1953 memoir by American writer Shirley Jackson. The book contains fictionalized stories based on Jackson's own life with her husband and four children. Many of these stories were originally published in women's magazines. Jackson edited these short stories into a book that chronicles a family and their experience living in a small town in Vermont. Life Among the Savages received positive reviews applauding the hilarious description of domestic life.

Life Among the Savages was originally published by Farrar, Straus and Young in 1953. The book was reissued by Penguin Books in 2015.

== Background ==
Life Among the Savages is a collection of short stories Jackson wrote about her life that she edited into book form. Many of these stories were originally published in women's magazines such as Good Housekeeping, Woman's Home Companion, and Mademoiselle.

Life Among the Savages is based on Jackson's own life with her husband and four children. The mother, who is the narrator, is Jackson herself. The father, only referred to as "my husband," is a representation of Jackson's own husband, Stanley Edgar Hyman. The children each represent Jackson's own children: Laurie represents Jackson's eldest child, Laurence; Jannie represents Jackson's second child, Joanne; Sally represents Jackson's third child, Sarah; and Barry represents Jackson's youngest child, Barry.

The family's house in Life Among the Savages is based on the house where Jackson and her family lived in North Bennington, Vermont. A picture of Jackson's four children is displayed on the first edition jacket cover. The book is dedicated, "For the Children’s Grandparents."

Life Among the Savages is followed by a sequel, Raising Demons (1957).

== Genre ==
Life Among the Savages is a memoir. Although the book contains fictionalized elements, it is officially categorized as nonfiction. Ruth Franklin notes that "Like virtually all humor writing, Savages straddles the line between fiction and fact; it is autobiographical but not necessarily true." Judy Oppenheimer says that, although fictionalized, there is a lot of truth in Life Among the Savages.

The book is a work of domestic comedy that Lenemaja Friedman refers to as "family chronicles." With the publication of Life Among the Savages, Jackson is considered a pioneer of humorous domestic storytelling, paving the way for "mommy bloggers.

== Style ==
At the time of its release, Jackson was already known for her gothic fiction and psychological thrillers. Jackson had cemented her macabre reputation with the publication of The Road Through the Wall (1948), The Lottery and Other Stories (1949), and Hangsaman (1951).

The humorous chronicles of domestic life in Life Among the Savages presented a shift from Jackson's traditional style. However, scholars have identified ties between Jackson's seemingly disparate works. Most of Jackson's horror stories are rooted in domestic life. Lynette Carpenter notes that even Jackson's gothic novels have traces of humor in them. Franklin says that macabre touches makes Life Among the Savages recognizable as Jackson's work. Roberta Rubenstein points to the title words savages and demons in Jackson's memoirs to understand the intertwining of macabre and humor.

== Plot summary ==
The narrator, who is also the nameless mother, relays a series of comical stories from the life of her family. She focuses primarily on her attempts to keep peace and domestic efficiency despite her increasing number of children. Life Among the Savages is divided into three parts, titled "One," "Two," and "Three," and includes an appendix.

=== One ===
The family is abruptly given notice to vacate their city apartment. After an extensive, frantic search, the family finds an old house in Vermont with large white pillars. At the time of the move, the family has two children, Laurie and Jannie. Eldest child Laurie is introduced to kindergarten. He relays to the family the frequent troublemaking of his classmate Charles. When Laurie's mother asks the teacher about Charles, she responds, "Charles?" We don't have any Charles in the kindergarten."

The family’s third child, Sally, has a lengthy delay in her arrival, throwing the whole family into chaos. At the hospital, when the mother is asked her occupation she says, “writer,” and the receptionist replies, “I’ll just put down housewife.”

=== Two ===
When various members of the family are sick with grippe, mix-ups occur through the night and everyone wakes up with a different combination of bed, blanket, pillow, and drink—including the dog. One blanket disappears throughout the night and remains a family mystery. The mother attends driving school and the family finally gets their first car. Jannie insists that her seven imaginary daughters come to every family outing, including a frenzied shopping trip that the mother tries to calmly manage. While riding his bike, Laurie is struck by a car and injured. Laurie is eager to recount a dramatized tale of his incident to his class.

=== Three ===
Laurie’s father offers to write a document stating their house was haunted if Laurie would distribute it (this document appears in the book’s appendix). When the family takes a trip to the bank, the bank manager dressed as Santa Claus promises the children gifts that the family cannot afford.

Barry, the youngest child, appears as a baby newly arrived from the hospital. The other children admire him briefly before Laurie tries to congratulate his mother on the baby. He settles on telling her it will be nice to have something to keep her busy now that they are "all grown up."

=== Appendix: Handbill ===
The appendix contains the document detailing the poltergeist incidents in the residence of S.E.H.

== Reception ==
Life Among the Savages debuted on the New York Times best-seller list.

The majority of both critical and public reviews of Life Among the Savages was positive. Orville Prescott described the book as, "the funniest, the most engaging, and the most irresistibly delightful book I have read in years and years." Jane Cobb described the book as warm, hilarious, and believable. Cobb praised the accurate description of domestic chaos and the unique approach in recounting these events. Readers, especially women, enjoyed the book and thought the chronicles were a believable description of domesticity. Some women reached out to Jackson asking for writing advice.

Feminist writer Betty Friedan, in The Feminine Mystique, said Jackson was perpetuating the myth of the "happy housewife." Friedan said that writers of domestic literature, like Jackson, mislead traditional housewives into thinking they are the same.

Many critics wondered how Jackson, with her gothic stories, could switch to writing domestic tales. One reviewer wrote, "One would sooner expect [Charles] Addams to illustrate Little Women than Miss Jackson to write a cheerful book about family life."

Scholars such as Bernice M. Murphy have said that Jackson's literary reputation could have been weakened by the publishing of Life Among the Savages and other domestic stories. Angela Hague says that Jackson's work is not read or studied at the level it should be, which she attributes in part to the existence of Jackson's domestic literature. Carpenter suggests Jackson's domestic writings diminished her credibility in the eyes of traditional male critics, who had difficulty understanding her role as both a writer and a housewife.
