= Mark Fried =

American translator

Mark Fried is an American translator of Latin American literature, primarily known for his translations of the Uruguayan writer Eduardo Galeano and the Mexican writer Elmer Mendoza. Fried grew up on the East Coast of the United States and spent his twenties living and travelling in Latin America. He lives in Canada and is married to the writer Elizabeth Hay.

He has translated the following works by Galeano:

- Soccer in Sun and Shadow
- Mirrors: Stories of Almost Everyone
- Children of the Days: A Calendar of Human History
- Upside Down: A Primer for the Looking-Glass World
- Hunter of Stories
- Voices of Time: A Life in Stories
- Walking Words
- We Say No: Chronicles 1963-1991

He has also translated the following works from Spanish to English:

- Echoes of the Mexican-American War by Luis Gerardo Morales Moreno (editor)
- Past and Present of the Verbs to Read and to Write: Essays on Literacy by Emilia Ferreiro
- Map Drawn by a Spy by Guillermo Cabrera Infante
- Firefly by Severo Sarduy
- Silver Bullets by Élmer Mendoza
- The Acid Test by Élmer Mendoza
- Name of the Dog by Élmer Mendoza
