= Like Mother Used to Make =

Short story by Shirley Jackson

"Like Mother Used to Make" is a short story by Shirley Jackson. It was originally published in the 1949 short story collection The Lottery and Other Stories by publisher Farrar, Straus and Giroux. It contains the second appearance of James Harris, a recurring character in the collection.

== Plot summary ==
The story begins with David, a very fastidious man, buying butter and rolls at the store. He then goes home to prepare dinner for himself and his neighbor, Marcia, who he invited. Worried that Marcia might forget about his invitation, he invites himself into her empty apartment to leave a note. Her home is cluttered and dirty, the opposite of David's. He takes great pride in his home, which is very clean and carefully arranged with matching furniture. He is especially proud of his silverware set, which he carefully unboxes and sets on the table. During the dinner, Marcia's coworker, Mr. Harris, comes to call on her and she invites him into David's apartment without asking permission. Mr. Harris quickly makes David feel unwelcome in his own home. He leaves his dirty dishes on the table and lights up a cigar without asking David, who grows increasingly anxious for them to be gone. At the end of the night, David is kicked out of his own home and retreats to Marcia's unwelcoming apartment, as if he was the guest and Marcia the host. Unable to respond to being removed, he begins to clean Marcia's apartment.

== Origin ==
According to Jackson's biographer Judy Oppenheimer, the idea for the story came from apartment neighbors she knew in real life, Ben Zimmerman and Taissa Kellman. Taissa and Stanley Edgar Hyman (Jackson's husband) refused to leave when Ben was expecting a guest.

== Themes ==
Reviewer L. Timmel Duchamp claims that most of Jackson's fiction "presents mundane reality as troubled with sinister currents", citing this short story as an example. Mr. Harris, a "malevolent shape-shifter", makes David's familiar home something alienating by the end of the story. The theme of homes being connected to our identities is also important to the story, according to scholar Gustavo Vargas Cohen. He claims that Jackson shows an "ambiguous obsession with domestic work" in the story through David's concern with the organization of his apartment.

The character of James Harris is central to the story, as with other stories in the collection. Jessica Ferri claims that the devilish Harris appears in more than half the stories, often making suggestions. His character was inspired by a character of the same name from a folk ballad, "The Daemon Lover", about a woman who is persuaded by the Devil to run away with him. Ferri claims that Jackson's story collection displays "the presence of total and absolute evil in daily life", reinforced by the ominous James Harris.
