= Raising Demons =

1957 memoir by Shirley Jackson

- Author: Shirley Jackson
- Release number: 2nd in series
- Genre: Memoir
- Publisher: Penguin Books (2015 edition); Doubleday (2000 edition); Quality Paperback Book Club (1998 edition); Academy Chicago Publishers (1994 edition); Popular Library (1979 edition)
- Publication date: 1957
- Pages: 310
- ISBN: 0-14-312729-2
- Preceded by: Life Among the Savages

Raising Demons is a "domestic memoir" by American author Shirley Jackson. It was first published in 1957, as a follow-up to her first memoir, Life Among the Savages. The book was reissued in 2015 by Penguin.

== Background ==
As was the case of Life Among the Savages, Raising Demons is composed primarily of short stories Jackson had previously published in women's magazines.

== Plot ==
The book picks up shortly after where Life Among the Savages left off. With four children, numerous pets, thousands of books, and countless personal possessions, the narrator realizes with alarm that they have filled up the large house from the previous book and insists they must find a bigger house (to which her husband responds "there is no bigger house"). The family at last purchases an enormous old farmhouse on the edge of town, only to learn that it is still occupied by four different families who show no hurry to move out, all while suffering the indignity of a moving company that appears to have stolen all their furniture. The family spends the summer at a home in a resort town while they wait for the house to be vacated. The four children, now older, have developed their own distinctly different personalities: Laurie, the natural leader; Jannie, the romantic conformist; Sally, the stubborn, self-defined imp; and good-natured baby Barry, who seems to regard the rest of his family with wry amusement. With the often indifferent assistance of her husband, the narrator struggles to maintain order and discipline through a series of domestic adventures, even through the heartbreak of realizing her children are growing up.

== Reception ==
While Raising Demons was criticized as less humorous than its predecessor, with some reviewers noting a "tart and tangy" tone compared to the lighter Life Among The Savages, overall it received and continues to receive positive reviews from critics. Ruth Franklin, writing for The New York Times, stated that Jackson "had a genuine gift for this mode of writing," concluding that "Jackson’s relaxed approach to child-rearing feels refreshingly sane." A Kirkus review commented that the book is "a very pleasant form of pandemonium and hugely entertaining."
