= Emilia Ferreiro =

Argentine writer and psychologist (1937–2023)

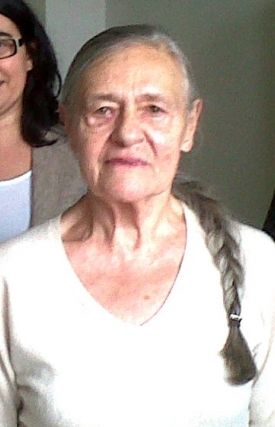
- Born: 5 May 1937
- Died: 26 August 2023 (aged 86); Mexico City
- Awards: honorary doctorate (7); Guggenheim Fellowship; Order of Andrés Bello; Konex Award (1986)

Emilia Beatriz María Ferreiro Schiavi (5 May 1937 – 26 August 2023) was an Argentine psychologist, writer, and educator, based in Mexico, with a doctorate from the University of Geneva, under the guidance of Jean Piaget. She was recognized for her contributions to understanding the evolutionary process of written language acquisition.

== Life and career ==
Emilia Ferreiro was born on 5 May 1937. In 1970, after training in psychology at the University of Buenos Aires, she studied at the University of Geneva, where she also worked as a research assistant and collaborator with Hermine Sinclair, Bärbel Inhelder and Jean Piaget, and obtained her doctorate under the supervision and guidance of the Swiss psychologist. She returned to Buenos Aires in 1971, where she would form a study group on literacy, and also published his doctoral thesis: Les relations temporelles dans le langage de l'enfant (Temporal relations in the child's language). The following year, she received a Guggenheim Fellowship. In 1974 she stepped away from her teaching duties at the University of Buenos Aires.

In 1977, after the coup d'état in Argentina, she went to live in exile, in Switzerland, studying at the University of Geneva. Later, she began with Margarita Gómez Palacio a study in Monterrey with children with learning difficulties. In 1979 she went to live in Mexico City with her husband, the physicist and epistemologist Rolando García, with whom she had two children. There she entered the Educational Research Department of the Center for Research and Advanced Studies.

Ferreiro was Emeritus Researcher of the National System of Researchers of Mexico (2008), and Emeritus Researcher of CINVESTAV (2010). She died on 26 August 2023, at the age of 86.

== Selected works ==
- 1971 – Les relations temporelles dans le langage de l'enfant (with foreword by Jean Piaget)
- 1982 – Nuevas perspectivas sobre los procesos de lectura y escrita (with Margarita Gómez Palacio)
- 1982 – Literacy before schooling (With Ana Teberosky).
- 1985 – Proceso de alfabetización. La alfabetización en proceso.
- 1986 – Los sistemas de escritura en desarollo del niño (with Ana Teberosky)
- 1989 – Los hijos del analfabetismo e Propuestas para la alfabetización escolar em América Latina, (organizer)
- 2003 – Past and present of the verbs to read and to write: essays on literacy (with Mark Fried – also translator).

== Bibliography ==
- ana luiza Bustamante Smolka. 1996. A criança na fase inicial da escrita: a Alfabetização como processo discursivo. 7ª ed. São Paulo: Editorial Cortez. Revista Nova Escola enero/febrero de 2001
- Tau, R. (2022) Ferreiro, Emilia. In: Jacó-Vilela A.M., Klappenbach H., Ardila R. (eds.). The Palgrave Biographical Encyclopedia of Psychology in Latin America. Palgrave Macmillan, Cham. https://doi.org/10.1007/978-3-030-38726-6_484-1
