= The Hills of Varna =

1948 novel by Geoffrey Trease

- Macmillan, 1958 edition
- Author: Geoffrey Trease
- Illustrator: Treyer Evans
- Language: English
- Genre: historical fiction
- Publisher: Macmillan & Co
- Publication date: 1948

The Hills of Varna (published in the USA as Shadow of the Hawk) is a children's historical novel by Geoffrey Trease, published in 1948. It is an adventure story based on the revival of classical scholarship in the Renaissance.

== Plot ==
=== Introduction ===
The book is set mainly in continental Europe during the first decade of the 16th century. The central character, a young Englishman, is sent by Erasmus to find the lost manuscript of an ancient Greek play at a monastery in the Balkans.

=== Summary ===
In 1509, Alan Drayton, a young Yorkshireman, has to leave his college in Cambridge after a tavern brawl. His tutor Erasmus sends him to the continent to try to retrieve a manuscript of The Gadfly, a lost play by the ancient Greek writer Alexis from the time of Socrates. He believes that it is in the monastery of Varna in the Balkans. Alan intends to deliver the play to the printer Aldus Manutius in Venice, refusing to take employment with the ruthless Duke of Molfetta, who wants the play for his private collection. He is joined on the arduous journey to the monastery by a young Italian woman, Angela d'Asola, who disguises herself as a boy. They encounter Adriatic pirates, shipwreck, Turkish janissaries and sinister monks, all the while being doggedly pursued by the agents of the Duke. They find the manuscript but lose it again. In the end, their love of learning saves the day.

The author avoids the obvious ending of having the two leading characters marry each other, instead following the custom of the time Angela marries an older wealthy man whom she has had in mind for some time. Alan returns to England, on the verge of its own Renaissance, to continue his education.

== Literary significance and reception ==
The book has been widely praised by critics, as illuminating the historical process and is considered by some to be the author's greatest work.

== Allusions to history and geography ==
Erasmus of Rotterdam, the Dutch scholar and humanist, taught at Cambridge for a time, and was associated with the Venetian publishing house the Aldine Press and its founder Aldus Manutius. The author states: "Whenever possible, I have used actual opinions of Aldus and Erasmus in the dialogue." Marcus Musurus, Aldus's Cretan assistant, was a Greek scholar who taught at the University of Padua and was closely involved with the publication of Greek texts. Alexis the playwright is a fictional character, not to be confused with the real Greek writer of this name who lived somewhat later, but he represents the many ancient authors whose work was lost.

The novel starts in Cambridge and moves to the Republic of Venice, then to Dalmatia and the mountainous central Balkans. The monastery at Varna is a fictional place, not connected with the real town of Varna or Lake Varna in Bulgaria.

== The Crown of Violet ==
In 1952 Trease wrote a prequel to The Hills of Varna, The Crown of Violet. The title is taken from a quote from Pindar (see City of the Violet Crown). Set in ancient Athens, it is about how Alexis wrote The Gadfly, a comedy defending Socrates, and contains vivid descriptions of the Greek theatre. As in The Hills of Varna and Cue for Treason, the hero befriends a spirited, convention-defying girl who plays a vital role in the adventure (in this case Corinna, a metic).

Its American title Web of Traitors refers to the subplot of a planned coup d'état against the Athenian democracy; a speech in Alexis's play is used to trick the plotters into revealing themselves.
