= Never Let Me Go (1953 film) =

1953 film by Delmer Daves

- Theatrical release poster
- Directed by: Delmer Daves
- Screenplay by: George Froeschel; Ronald Millar
- Based on: Came the Dawn; 1949 novel by Roger Bax
- Produced by: Clarence Brown
- Starring: Clark Gable; Gene Tierney; Richard Haydn
- Cinematography: Robert Krasker
- Edited by: Frank Clarke
- Music by: Hans May
- Production company: Metro-Goldwyn-Mayer
- Distributed by: Metro-Goldwyn-Mayer
- Release dates: 18 March 1953 (UK); 1 May 1953 (U.S.)
- Running time: 94 minutes
- Country: United Kingdom
- Language: English
- Budget: $1.58 million
- Box office: $2.4 million

Never Let Me Go is a 1953 MGM adventure romance film starring Clark Gable and Gene Tierney, with Richard Haydn in credited support. The picture was made in Britain, directed by Delmer Daves, and produced by Clarence Brown. The screenplay was by George Froeschel and Ronald Millar, based on the 1949 novel Came the Dawn by Roger Bax.

Also appearing are Bernard Miles, Belita, Kenneth More, Karel Štěpánek, and Theodore Bikel. The movie was shot at MGM's Elstree Studios and on location in Cornwall, with sets by art director Alfred Junge.

== Plot ==
Shortly after World War II, against strong cautions from both the U.S. consulate and the Soviet government, Moscow-based American newspaper reporter Philip Sutherland marries Russian ballerina Marya Lamarkina of the Bolshoi Ballet. They plan to settle in his native San Francisco eventually, though they realize that an exit visa for Marya will be difficult to obtain.

The Sutherlands honeymoon in Tallinn, where they encounter Marya's friend Svetlana, who is there with her English husband, Christopher Wellington St. John Denny. For taking pictures of his wife that include coastal topography in the background, Denny is accused of spying by the NKVD, the Russian secret police. He is sent home to England without his pregnant wife and banished from Russia.

Philip writes an article that annoys the government. He is transferred home to placate the Russian government, and sent back alone.

Because of strict Cold War censorship the couple can only communicate through letters smuggled by Philip's friend Steve Quillan, a respected English radio broadcaster who works in Moscow.

While visiting Christopher in Cornwall, Philip decides to smuggle the wives out of Russia. He buys a sea-kindly old Dutch sailboat and enlists the aid of experienced waterman Joe Brooks. Marya will be in Tallinn with the Bolshoi in mid-August, and arrangements for the rendezvous are made via Quillan. Christopher joins the rescue party at the last moment.

The threesome sail to the Gulf of Finland. Svetlana swims out from Tallinn and they pick her up, but the Bolshoi schedule has changed at the last minute and Marya is still dancing the lead in Swan Lake.

Philip swims ashore, where he is inconspicuous in the throng of beachgoers. He steals the uniform of a colonel in the medical corps from a cabana, and goes to the ballet. He is asked to treat an indisposed Russian general, is successful, and invited into his balcony box. When Marya is taking her bows she sees Philip in the audience and faints. The general sends him backstage to tend to the stricken ballerina. Acting swiftly, he insists she be taken to the hospital, and a limousine is provided. As they drive away, rival dancer and NDVD informant Valentina Alexandrovna recognizes Philip and alerts the authorities.

Philip overpowers the driver, and a desperate car chase ends with him deliberately driving off a pier into the Baltic Sea. Philip and Marya hide while their pursuers dive to locate their bodies. Stealthily, they swim together to the boat and freedom.

== Cast ==
- Clark Gable as Philip Sutherland
- Gene Tierney as Marya Lamarkina
- Bernard Miles as Joe Brooks
- Richard Haydn as Christopher Wellington St. John Denny
- Belita as Valentina Alexandrovna
- Kenneth More as Steve Quillan
- Karel Štěpánek as Commissar
- Theodore Bikel as Lieutenant
- Anna Valentina as Svetlana Mikhailovna
- Frederick Valk as Kuragin
- Peter Illing as N.K.V.D. Man
- Robert Henderson as U.S. Ambassador
- Stanley Maxted as John Barnes
- Meinhart Maur as Lemkov
- Alexis Chesnakov as General Zhdanov

== Production ==
Kenneth More says he got drunk the night before auditioning so he would not seem too young to play Gable's best friend.

== Reception ==
According to MGM records the film earned $1,482,000 in the US and Canada and $936,000 elsewhere, resulting in a loss of $86,000.

== See also ==
- List of British films of 1953
