= The Desperate Man (film) =

1959 British film by Peter Maxwell

- Directed by: Peter Maxwell
- Written by: James Eastwood
- Based on: novel Beginner's Luck by Paul Somers
- Produced by: Jack Greenwood
- Starring: Conrad Phillips; Jill Ireland; William Hartnell; Charles Gray
- Cinematography: Gerald Moss
- Edited by: Geoffrey Muller
- Music by: James Stevens
- Production company: Merton Park Studios
- Distributed by: Anglo-Amalgamated Film Distributors (UK)
- Release date: December 1959 (UK)
- Running time: 57 minutes
- Country: United Kingdom
- Language: English

The Desperate Man is a 1959 British second feature ('B') crime film directed by Peter Maxwell and starring Conrad Phillips, Jill Ireland, William Hartnell, Charles Gray and Peter Swanwick. It was written by James Eastwood adapted from the 1958 novel Beginner's Luck by Paul Somers, better known as Andrew Garve. The plot involves a writer who investigates a murder in the tower of a castle.

In the US, the feature was shown as an episode of Kraft Mystery Theater in 1961.

== Plot ==
Crime reporter Curtis and his girlfriend Carol pursue jewel thief Smith through the Sussex countryside. On arriving at an ancient castle, Smith abducts Carol and holds her hostage, and Curtis is forced to assist the thief to find his buried loot. Smith falls to his death from the castle battlements.

== Cast ==
- Conrad Phillips as Curtis
- Jill Ireland as Carol Bourne
- William Hartnell as Smith
- Charles Gray as Lawson
- Peter Swanwick as Hoad
- Arthur Gomez as Landlord
- John Warwick as Inspector Cobley
- Patricia Burke as Miss Prew
- Ernest Butcher as grocer

== Reception ==
The Monthly Film Bulletin wrote: "An implausible plot and dialogue and Jill Ireland's somewhat inept performance, which verges on a parody of the stereotyped second feature heroine, leave this pocket suspense feature with little but some pleasant location photography to recommend it."

Kine Weekly wrote: "The plot's a bit far-fetched, but the stars, competently directed, stimulate interest and keep its end up. There is no waste of footage, and the villain's traditional and spectacular demise precedes a happy ending. ... Jill Ireland displays a touch of class as Carol, Conrad Phillips has an easy manner as Curtis, and William Hartnell pulls out all the stops as Smith. There is just enough romance to appease the womenfolk, the climax carries a kick, and the staging is a cut above the average."

In British Sound Films: The Studio Years 1928–1959 David Quinlan rated the film as "poor", writing: "Desperate is right."
