= Came the Dawn =

1949 novel

- First Edition
- Author: Paul Winterton
- Language: English
- Genre: Thriller
- Publisher: Hutchinson; Harper (US)
- Publication date: 1949
- Publication place: United Kingdom
- Media type: Print

Came the Dawn is a 1949 thriller novel by the British writer and journalist Paul Winterton under the pseudonym of Roger Bax. Set in the Soviet Union it drew on Winterton's experience as Moscow correspondent for the News Chronicle and BBC. It was published in the United States by Harper under the alternative title Two If by Sea.

== Film adaptation ==
In 1953 it was adapted into the film Never Let Me Go, produced by the British subsidiary of MGM. Directed by Delmer Daves and starring Clark Gable, Gene Tierney and Bernard Miles.

== Bibliography ==
- Goble, Alan. The Complete Index to Literary Sources in Film. Walter de Gruyter, 1999.
- Reilly, John M. Twentieth Century Crime & Mystery Writers. Springer, 2015.
