= Bows against the Barons =

1934 children's novel about Robin Hood

Bows Against the Barons
- First edition
- Author: Geoffrey Trease
- Language: English
- Genre: Children's novel, historical novel
- Publisher: Martin Lawrence
- Publication date: 1934
- Publication place: United Kingdom
- Media type: Print (hardback & paperback)
- Pages: 152
- OCLC: 6171653

Bows Against the Barons is a 1934 children's novel by the British author Geoffrey Trease, based on the legend of Robin Hood. It tells the story of an adolescent boy who joins an outlaw band and takes part in a great rebellion against the feudal elite. Trease's first novel, Bows Against the Barons marks the start of his prolific career as a historical novelist. It is notable for reinterpreting the Robin Hood legend and revitalizing the conventions of children's historical fiction in 20th-century Britain.

== Plot introduction ==
Set in medieval England, Bows Against the Barons relates the adventures of a peasant boy who becomes an outlaw and joins the Robin Hood's band. Together, they take up arms against the masters of England and fight for the rights of the common people. The protagonist's former master tries to suppress them, but at great cost.

The title refers to the longbow, the primary weapon of the outlaws.

== Plot summary ==
Bows Against the Barons takes place during the final months of Robin Hood's life, beginning in early June, and ending in the following year about February. It is largely told from the viewpoint of Dickon, a 16-year-old peasant boy from the village of Oxton.

=== Chapters 1–9 ===
The novel opens by depicting Dickon's hardships as a serf on a baronial manor. He is whipped by his bailiff for missing work and harassed by the village priest for not paying tithe. Despite his youth, Dickon has to be his family's breadwinner because his father, Dick, has been conscripted as an archer for the Crusades. His troubles are compounded when the King's deer from nearby Sherwood Forest ravage his gardens. Moved by anger, Dickon kills one of the deer with an arrow. He then flees into the forest to avoid the penalties of poaching. Eventually, he meets Alan-a-Dale, who leads him to Robin Hood's band. Proving adept at archery, Dickon is welcomed into their company.

Disguised as a weaver's apprentice, Dickon becomes Robin's messenger to all of Nottingham's rebels. Led by a bridle-smith, Dickon and the populace assemble in the market-place to protest about working conditions and to demand the release of imprisoned workers. The Sheriff of Nottingham attempts to disperse them, but Robin and his outlaws arrive and overwhelm the Sheriff. In the resulting riot, the imprisoned workers are freed. However, mounted soldiers from Nottingham Castle arrive to quash the revolt.

Pursued by a horseman, Dickon escapes through secret passages and reaches the safety of Sherwood Forest, but he is captured by royal foresters and escorted north to be tried for poaching. However, Alan manages to make contact with Dickon, having disguised himself as a blind minstrel and his messages as doggerel. On Alan's instructions, Dickon attempts to delay the foresters' journey. His plans almost go awry when he meets his former master, Sir Rolf D'Eyncourt, who has returned from the Crusades and now attempts to reclaim Dickon. Fortunately, the head forester refuses to hand him over, insisting on the priority of royal justice. As his journey resumes, Dickon vows revenge when he learns that his father has been killed in battle. When Dickon and the foresters eventually reach a village, the blacksmith and the villagers protest at Dickon's captivity. In the ensuing struggle, a forester almost kills Dickon, but Alan arrives in time and saves him. Together, they join the villagers in defeating the foresters.

Later, soldiers are dispatched from Nottingham to punish the villagers, but Robin and his band ambush and defeat them before they reach their destination.

=== Chapters 10–20 ===
In the meantime, Sir Rolf exploits and oppresses his tenants in his pursuit of wealth and luxury. The outlaws of Sherwood Forest oppose him, stirring up the serfs to resist his tyranny. Allied with neighboring barons, Sir Rolf pens the outlaws in the forest and attempts to hunt them down. The outlaws defeat them by hiding in trees and picking off his men from camouflaged positions. As they celebrate their victory, Robin reveals his ultimate goal – the overthrow of all masters and freedom for the people of England.

The outlaws now prepare for an attack on D'Eyncourt Castle, gathering money for their needs. Alan leads Dickon and others to waylay the Abbot of Rufford, disguising themselves as knights and luring him into an ambush. Seeing Dickon's talent for disguises, Robin sends the boy to infiltrate D'Eyncourt Castle and acquire information about its defences. Disguised as a page with bleached hair, Dickon manages to penetrate D'Eyncourt on Christmas Day, but is betrayed by an undyed lock of hair. Pursued, he hides on the chapel's beams and eventually escapes from the castle, surviving a crossbow shot.

With Dickon's information, the outlaws finally attack the castle during winter. Alan leads Dickon and a group of outlaws to infiltrate and capture the castle keep. Taking up positions on its battlements, they pick off D'Eyncourt's defenders with their arrows while Robin launches the main assault on the outer walls. His combined force of outlaws and serfs eventually breaks through and razes the castle. Dickon kills his former bailiff, while Little John kills Sir Rolf.

Heartened by their success, the outlaws attempt to march on Nottingham itself. However, the Earl of Wessex traps them in a pincer movement between Nottingham and Newark and defeats them all. When his ally, the Archbishop, wonders aloud why the rebels die so willingly on the swords of his soldiers the Earl replies grimly, "Because they know that they are going to win – but not in my time."

Alan, Friar Tuck and Will Scarlet are among those killed. Dickon, Robin and Little John survive the battle and flee north with other survivors to Yorkshire, undergoing much hardship on their journey. Dickon almost drowns in a bog. Wounded, Robin takes refuge in Kirklees, whose prioress bleeds him to death to claim a reward from the Earl. Alerted by an arrow shot by Robin from his deathbed, the outlaws reclaim his body and burn down the priory in revenge.

After burying Robin, the outlaw band breaks up. Dickon and Little John are the only ones who remain dedicated to Robin's cause. They depart for the High Peak in Derbyshire, determined to continue Robin's work and fulfill his visionary ideal.

== Characters ==
=== Fictional characters ===
In order of appearance:

- Dickon: The protagonist. Depicted as a 16-year-old peasant boy with tousled black hair. He has a mother and three younger brothers.
- William: The bailiff of D'Eyncourt. Characterized by his harsh treatment of Sir Rolf's tenants.
- Thomas Pole: A Nottingham weaver acting as Robin's contact for the Nottingham riot.
- King's foresters: Six Gascon royal foresters who capture Dickon after the Nottingham riot. One of them, Guy, attempts to kill the boy during the villagers' attack.
- Hal the Harper: A persona adopted by Alan for his disguise as a blind minstrel.
- Sir Rolf D'Eyncourt: Dickon's former master. A violent and exploitative baron, the novel compares him to a mailed fist. His last name is possibly derived from a family surname of Lord Tennyson.
- Martin: A former apprentice from Barnsley and outlaw friend of Dickon. Nicknamed Ginger for his red hair.
- The Abbot of Rufford: A greedy, lecherous priest robbed by the outlaws.
- Etienne: A page who sees through Dickon's disguise during his D'Eyncourt mission.
- Ulric, Gurth: Two outlaws who join Alan's group to infiltrate D'Eyncourt's keep.
- The Earl of Wessex: A nobleman responsible for crushing Robin's rebellion. Originally a duke in the first edition, his peerage was changed in subsequent editions when Trease discovered that it did not exist during his novel's historical era.
- The Archbishop of York: An ally of the Earl of Wessex who helps the noble to forestall further uprisings by spreading anti-rebellion propaganda through his clerics and suppressing written records of Robin's deeds. Depicted as an old, cowardly priest.

=== Folklore figures ===
- Robin Hood: A central character. Depicted as an ageing but charismatic leader with "foxy-gold" hair and "steel-blue" eyes. Strongly egalitarian, he once rebukes Dickon for addressing him as "sir": "We're comrades in Sherwood, all equal. What's the sense of getting rid of one master and taking a new one?"
- Alan-a-Dale: A major character. Depicted as a good-natured trickster.
- Little John: A supporting character. Depicted as a good-natured giant and formidable fighter.
- Friar Tuck: A minor character. Depicted as a vigorous, worldly man.
- Will Scarlet: A minor character. Appears briefly in a dissenting role during the Abbot of Rufford robbery.
- Maid Marian: A minor character. Appears briefly as Robin's companion.
- The Sheriff of Nottingham: A minor character. Appears briefly during the Nottingham riot.
- The Prioress of Kirklees Priory: Appears in the last chapter as Robin's murderer. Depicted as a pale, sinister nun.

== Setting ==
Bows Against the Barons takes place largely in the English Midlands, primarily in Nottinghamshire. In the last two chapters, it moves north through the Peak District of Derbyshire into Yorkshire. As a Robin Hood novel, Bows Against the Barons has many places associated with the legend: Sherwood Forest, Nottingham, Kirklees and Hathersage. Barnsdale is mentioned several times as an alternative refuge and destination for Sherwood's outlaws. The novel also alludes briefly to Edwinstowe.

The novel takes place during the period of the Crusades, although it does not specify which one. It mentions that Sir Rolf has campaigned in the Holy Land and visited the "rotting courts of Eastern Europe", an allusion to the Byzantine Empire in its decline. Sir Rolf's tyranny is attributed in part to "new notions of cruelty and luxury" picked up in the latter place. The novel also alludes to the Norman Conquest as a historical background, depicting Nottingham as a town divided between Saxon and Norman boroughs, and comparing the battle between Robin and Wessex to the Battle of Hastings.

In his 1948 foreword and 1966 postscript, Trease compares his novel's events to the English peasants' revolt of 1381, and his version of Robin Hood to medieval rebels such as Wat Tyler, Robert Kett and Jack Cade.

== Major themes ==
Foreground from the first-edition illustration of the Nottingham riot

Bows Against the Barons is notable for its leftwing revision of the Robin Hood legend. In contrast to earlier depictions of the outlaw as a nobleman and loyal subject of the king, it portrays Robin as a populist figure of the radical left. The novel depicts Robin's outlaws as guerilla rebels who aid workers in a medieval class struggle against their masters, and it employs much revolutionary rhetoric, bearing chapter titles such as "Comrades of the Forest" and "The People Speak". The Robin Hood scholar Stephen Thomas Knight describes the novel as being "rich with the leftist enthusiasm of the mid 1930s", comparing the Nottingham riot scene to Sergei Eisenstein's The Battleship Potemkin.

The first edition of Bows Against the Barons supplemented the novel's leftist rhetoric with illustrations of a similar nature. For example, one of these illustrations depicts the Nottingham riot as a crowd scene filled with hammer and sickle imagery. (See image to the right.)

Bows Against the Barons is also a coming-of-age story that depicts an adolescent protagonist's attempts to overcome difficulties and understand his place in the world.

== Literary context ==
=== Background ===
Trease began composing Bows Against the Barons in 1933. In his 1948 foreword and 1966 postscript to the novel, he explained his motivation for doing so. Since childhood, he had enjoyed reading stories about Robin Hood but also felt doubtful about some details in these stories – for example, the portrayal of outlaw life with its hardships as "jolly", and Robin's subservience to the king. Trease thus wanted to "create a new picture of Sherwood Forest which should be truer to life".

In a 1996 essay, Trease provided a more detailed context for his novel's composition:

As a child, I had been a Henty addict... [and] had absorbed the Henty values – the glories of war, the superiority of the British Empire and a white skin, the inferiority of the female... You sided with the Cavaliers against the Roundheads, the French aristocrats against the howling mob. The working class were tolerated only if faithful retainers. By the end of my schooldays I was abandoning such values.... [I]n 1933 I was a rather naive Left-wing member of the Labour Party, newly married and struggling to survive as a freelance writer.... [A]fter a rejected novel and other disappointments the desperate idea came to me, though even then it was largely prompted by my political sympathies. Why should children be educated – indeed indoctrinated – with Right-wing views and then later have to be laboriously converted, one by one, to the Left-wing gospel? Could we not catch them young?

To realise his idea, Trease approached a publisher associated with the Communist Party of Great Britain and made his proposal for a leftist Robin Hood novel. It was accepted. Bows Against the Barons was written "at white-hot speed" and published in the following year.

In later years, Trease was critical about his own novel. He found fault with its historical errors and lack of research, both of which he attributed to youthful over-confidence, and made efforts to "remove the worst blemishes" in later editions. He also criticised the novel for being "propagandist" and toned down its leftist rhetoric in later editions – for example, removing the words "workers" and "comrade" from much of the text. However, Trease also acknowledged its "vitality" as a "young man's book".

=== Reception ===
Initially, the novel met a largely indifferent response in Britain and the United States. As the author later recalled, it was "neither denounced nor derided but largely ignored". However, it was an immediate success in the Soviet Union, which resulted in a five-month visit there by the author and his wife to collect royalties in 1935. It was at this time that he contributed to a journal called 'International Literature: Organ of the International Union of Revolutionary Writers' Number 7 (1935) with an article 'Revolutionary Literature for the Young' in which he lays out some principles of what this should be and suggests that there should be a new kind of hero in children's books.

In The Oxford Companion to Children's Literature (1984), Humphrey Carpenter and Mari Prichard criticised Bows Against the Barons for its "political preaching", especially for making "Robin [speak] like a member of the British Communist Party during the 1930s". However, they also praised the novel as "a well-crafted adventure story, showing the narrative skill which is characteristic of all Trease's fiction".

=== Significance ===
As Trease's first novel, Bows Against the Barons marks his debut in children's historical fiction. He would continue contributing to this genre until 1997.

Bows Against the Barons is notable for its radical reworking of conventions for children's historical fiction in Britain. Its anti-authoritarian stance challenged the conservative values that had dominated the genre since the 19th century, especially the imperialist works of G. A. Henty. Its modern prose style, egalitarian characterisation, and realist attention to the harshness of medieval life all mark significant departures from the aristocratic focus and romantic glamour that had dominated the genre since the 19th century. These changes anticipate the mid-20th-century renewal of children's historical fiction by writers such as Rosemary Sutcliff, Henry Treece, Cynthia Harnett and Trease himself.

In a 1995 Socialist Review article on children's fiction, Alan Gibbons cites Bows Against the Barons as a seminal work of socialist literature for children, praising it as an "inspirational read" and comparing its conclusion to Howard Fast's Spartacus.

A 2003 ALAN Review article credits Bows Against the Barons with founding the genre of the young adult Robin Hood novel. Subsequent contributions to this genre have included Monica Furlong's Robin's Country, Theresa Tomlinson's Forestwife trilogy, Nancy Springer's Rowan Hood series, Robin McKinley's The Outlaws of Sherwood and Michael Cadnum's Forbidden Forest.

== Publication history ==
- 1934, UK, Martin Lawrence, OCLC 6171653, Hardcover. First edition. Illustrated by Michael Boland.
- 1948, UK, Lawrence & Wishart, OCLC 9211980, Hardcover. New edition. Illustrated by Jack Matthew.
- 1966, UK, Hodder & Stoughton, ISBN 0-340-04043-2, Hardcover. Revised edition. Illustrated by C. Walter Hodges.
- 2004, UK, Elliott & Thompson, ISBN 1-904027-26-1, Paperback. Young Spitfire reprint of 1966 edition.
