= Geoffrey Trease =

British writer (1909–1998)

- Born: 11 August 1909; Nottingham, England
- Died: 27 January 1998 (aged 88); Bath, England
- Occupation: Writer
- Partner: Marian Boyer
- Children: Jocelyne Payne
- Writing career
- Language: English
- Genre: Children's historical fiction
- Notable works: Cue for Treason; Bows Against the Barons; The Crown of Violet; The Hills of Varna
- Notable awards: New York Herald Tribune Book Award, 1966

Robert Geoffrey Trease FRSL (11 August 1909 – 27 January 1998) was a prolific British writer who published 113 books, mainly for children, between 1934 and 1997, starting with Bows Against the Barons and ending with Cloak for a Spy in 1997. His work has been translated into 20 languages. He is best known for the children's novel Cue for Treason (1940).

Trease served as Chairman of the Children's Writer's Group from 1962 to 1963; Chairman of the Society of Authors from 1974 to 1998; and Fellow of the Royal Society of Literature, from 1979.

His grandfather was a historian, and was one of the main influences on his work. Trease's children's historical novels reflect his insistence on historically correct backgrounds, which he meticulously researched. His ground-breaking study Tales Out of School (1949) pioneered the idea that children's literature should be a serious subject for study and debate. When he began his career, his radical viewpoint was a change from the conventional and often jingoistic tone of most children's literature of the time, and he was one of the first authors who deliberately set out to appeal to both boys and girls and to feature strong leading characters of both sexes.

== Life and work ==
Trease was born in Nottingham in 1909, third and youngest son of George Trease (1873–1932), a wine merchant, and his wife Florence Dale (1874–1955), a doctor's daughter. His eldest brother, George, was seven years older, the middle brother, William, older by three years. His elder brother, George E. Trease, became Professor of Pharmacognosy at Nottingham University and an uncle, George F Sleggs (Fred) was a journalist and later a biology professor at first, Dalhousie University, Halifax, Nova Scotia and later at the University of Chicago.

=== Education ===
Trease's first school was the small private school, the co-educational Ashbourne House kept by the 'Misses Rogers". Although Trease would have been sent to Nottingham High School anyway, it was Kate Rogers who suggested that Trease be entered for a Scholarship. In the event, Trease received a letter explaining that he had come second, and that in accordance with the preference of the Governors, the financial scholarship would be given to a boy from a Public Elementary School, while Trease would receive an Honorary Foundation Scholarship, as a mark of distinction, without financial benefit. Trease reported that his father was relieved: the financial implications of the word scholarship were embarrassing.

At Nottingham High School, Trease helped to start a magazine, wrote stories, poems, and a three-act play. Mid-way through the school he won one of the Junior Sir Thomas White Scholarships given on the results of the Ordinary exams (better known as O Levels). The significance of this is that as his fees were now paid, his father decided to use the money that would have been used to create a savings account for the young Geoffrey. In addition, Geoffrey was to keep the termly stipend of £2 13s 4d for himself, which provided him with independent means to spend on books and theatre tickets (he attended the Theatre Royal, Nottingham weekly, and records seeing the last of the actor managers, the Henry Baynton Company). As a reward, he was also invited to choose a gift: he chose a typewriter. But the key intervention in his education was his Headmaster's insistence that Trease join the Classics strand. As Greek clashed with History, Trease lost his favourite subject. In 1967 Trease dedicated his book The Grand Tour to his old history teacher, R. S. Bridge, but the damage was done. Trease would lose the chance to study history at university as he would have wished. Checking the list of Headmasters at Nottingham High School, it is clear that the Headmaster when Trease entered the school was George Sherbrooke Turpin, the first President of the Nottingham branch of the Historical Association. However, Turpin left in 1925, around the period Trease was 'streamed'.

During this time Trease read his father's Daily Mail, but also attended political meetings in Nottingham of the Labour Party and the Communist party, with an eye to becoming a cub journalist on the Nottingham Guardian (his Greek tutor, who had rubbished this idea, was A. D. Whitehorn the father of the journalist Katherine Whitehorn). Encouraged by his English teacher, the author Garry Hogg, Trease submitted a play and a novel to Faber. Both were rejected.

Awarded a Foundation Scholarship for Classics at The Queen's College Oxford University, Trease found his tutor, T. W. Allen (a very conservative classicist) dull and after a year, left university without a degree and moved to London. However during that time Trease attended debates at the Oxford Union, and put his conversion to socialism down to a speech by the charismatic Labour Minister, Oswald Mosely.

=== Work ===
When Trease left Oxford, he was reluctant to return home, and took up a suggestion from his English teacher, Garry Hogg, that he should try settlement work, and spent the next year at Kingsley Hall, the settlement run by Hogg's aunt, the socialist and pacifist campaigner, Muriel Lester. A full description of his time there can be found in A Whiff of Burnt Boats, Chapter Eleven (1971). Trease remained intent on becoming a writer and wrote for the Settlement newspaper, the New Chronicle. It was during this time that he joined a left-wing group called the "Promethean Society" whose members included Hugh Gordon Porteus and Desmond Hawkins.

After leaving the Settlement, Trease worked first for a Book Club start up (which failed) and then for a commercial 'puff' paper, where he stayed from 1930 to 1932. During this time he shared a flat with a friend, and used the flat to organise rent strikes and poster parades. At the end of this time, Trease decided that the writing for the paper had damaged his ability to write fiction, and -- in the face of the dole queues of the 1930s--turned to one area where middle-class men without degrees could get jobs, a small private school. It was here that he met his future wife, Marian. At the time women had to leave teaching if they married, and Trease wanted to write, so they left the school, married and moved to Bath. Trease began writing as a freelancer. Scraping by in his first year he decided to try something different.

While in London I had come across a book translated from the Russian, Moscow has a Plan, in which a Soviet author brilliantly dramatised for young readers that first Five-year Plan which had already captured the imagination of the world. I did not want to write books like that... but Illin's had planted a time-bomb in my mind which now suddenly exploded into questions and ideas. Why were all our own children's books still rooted in the pre-1914 assumptions which serious adult literature had abandoned?... Such stories still implied that war was glorious, that the British were superior to foreigners, that coloured 'natives' were 'loyal' if they sided with the invading white man and 'treacherous' if they used their wits to counterbalance his overwhelming armaments.

=== The Second World War ===
In 1938 Trease took a post at the small (19-30 boys) preparatory school, Harecroft Hall, Seascale. Here he wrote his best known novel, the Elizabethan Cue for Treason. The postwar Labour politician Tam Dayell remembered being read drafts of this book, 'he read entrancingly'. During this period, he also began reviewing children's books for T. C. Worsley of the New Statesman, which would feed in to his non-fiction book, Tales Out of School (1949) which was the first British book of children's literature criticism.

Trease entered the army on 26 March 1942, joining the King's Own Royal Regiment. and after basic training, was assigned to the Educational Corps. He served most of his time in Warwickshire with a break for an international residential course in Oxford, and was posted to India in July 1945. He was demobilised in July 1946. Trease helped lead army discussion groups during the June 1945 election campaign. During this time he wrote Trumpets in the West (1947)

=== Writing ===
Trease described his own childhood reading as "a diet of classist and racist historical adventure" but in 1933, he came across a translation of a Russian book titled Moscow has a Plan, in which a Soviet author dramatised the First five-year plan for young readers. Inspired by this, in 1934 Trease wrote Bows Against the Barons, published by Martin Lawrence Ltd. the official publisher of the Communist Party (it merged with Wishart in 1936 to become Lawrence and Wishart). Bows Against the Barons was a left-wing update of Robin Hood that showcased a radical approach to historical literature for young people. This included the use of modern English, rather than linguistic mannerisms, strong male and female characters, often from less privileged levels of society and meticulous attention to detail. It sold around 3000 copies in the UK. It was the publication of this book in Moscow that led to the Trease's travelling to the USSR for a year as members of the Co-operative Publishing Society of Foreign Workers. The couple's experiences on this trip became the material for Red Comet (1937), a lightly fictionalised children's adventure and travelogue.

An enduring belief in equality and fairness is a theme in many of Geoffrey Trease's books, as are links between the historical settings of his novels and contemporary issues.

Trease wrote two plays, After the Tempest which won both the overall prize and the Best New Play at the Welwyn Drama Festival (1938) and Colony (1938) for Unity Theatre. After the Tempest was a rare foray into science fiction; set on an island in the future the rescued aristocratic family and their servants discover that the outside world has had a revolution (pub. J. W. Marriot, The Best One Act Plays of 1938). Colony told the story of a Sugar workers's strike in the West Indies. The strike leader was played by Robert Adams, a British Guyanase actor and founder of the Negro Repertory Arts Theatre, one of the first Black theatre companies in the UK. The play was a critical success and ran for five weeks in house; plans were made to move it to the West End, but the start of the Second World War led to the closure of the theatres, and the play was never revived.

Bows Against the Barons was translated into Russian and sold immensely well there; his next work, Comrades for the Charter was less successful but Cue for Treason in 1940 proved enduringly popular and remains his best known work. His subjects cover a wide range of historical periods, such as The Crown of Violet, set in Ancient Greece, The Red Towers of Granada, Middle Ages, The Hills of Varna, Renaissance Europe, Cue for Treason and Cloak for a Spy, Elizabethan England, Fire on the Wind and Popinjay Stairs, Restoration London, Thunder of Valmy, French Revolution, The White Nights of St Petersburg, the Bolshevik Revolution and Tomorrow Is a Stranger, World War II.

Trease also wrote modern school stories, including the five Black Banner novels set in the Lake District, the first being No Boats on Bannermere, as well as a number of adult novels, history, plays for radio and television, and biographies. He authored a guide aimed at teaching creative writing to young adults, The Young Writer: A Practical Handbook. He wrote three books of autobiography: A Whiff of Burnt Boats (1971), Laughter at the Door (1974), and in the last year of his life, the final part, Farewell the Hills. This was written for his family and friends, and published privately after his death.

After the war, as well as novels, Trease wrote historical fiction for the BBC radio director, Norman Swallow.

Trease was an acknowledged influence on author Hester Burton and inspired others, including Rosemary Sutcliff and Leon Garfield. While in some ways they outpaced him, he continued to write, and published 113 books before "calling it a day" at the age of 88 because of illness. Many were translated for foreign markets, including Asia and Europe. In the United States he won the New York Herald Tribune Book Award for the Children's Spring Festival 1966 for This is Your Century.

He married Marian Boyer (1906–1989) in 1933 and they spent most of their marriage in Colwall, near The Downs School, Great Malvern. They had one daughter, Jocelyne, and moved to Bath to be closer to her, shortly before Marian's death.

== Works ==
=== Children's writing ===
==== Junior novels ====
- Bows Against the Barons (Lawrence) (1934)
- Comrades for the Charter (Lawrence) (1934)
- The New House at Hardale (Boys Own Paper - 2 instalments) (1934)
- Call to Arms (Lawrence) (1935)
- Missing from Home (Lawrence & Wishart) (1937)
- Mystery on the Moors (Black) (1937)
- The Christmas Holiday Mystery (Black) (1937)
- Detectives of the Dales (Black) (1938)
- In the Land of the Mogul (Black) (1938)
- Cue for Treason (Blackwell) (1940)
- Running Deer (Harrap) (1941)
- Grey Adventurer (Blackwell) (1942)
- Black Night, Red Morning (Blackwell) (1944)
- Trumpets in the West (Blackwell) Revised Edition 1994 (Piper) Paperback only (1947)
- Silver Guard (Blackwell) (1948)
- The Hills of Varna (Macmillan) US title: Shadow of the Hawk (Vanguard Press) (1948)
- No Boats on Bannermere (Heinemann) (1949) (1st in Bannermere series)
- The Secret Fiord (Macmillan) (1950)
- Sir Walter Raleigh: Captain and Adventurer (Vanguard) (1950)
- Under Black Banner (Heinemann) (1951) (2nd in Bannermere series)
- The Crown of Violet (Macmillan) US title: Web of Traitors (Vanguard) (1952)
- Black Banner Players (Heinemann) (1952) (3rd in Bannermere series)
- The Barons' Hostage (Phoenix House) Revised Edition 1973 (Brockhampton Press) (1952)
- The Silken Secret (Blackwell) (1953)
- The Island of the Gods (Children's Newspaper - Serial 14 parts) (1954)
- Black Banner Abroad (Heinemann) (1954) (4th in Bannermere series)
- Word to Caesar (Macmillan) US title: Message to Hadrian (Vanguard) (1955)
- The School Beyond the Snows (Children's Newspaper) (1955)
- The Gates of Bannerdale (Heinemann) (1956) (5th in Bannermere series)
- Mist over Athelney (Macmillan) US title: Escape to King Alfred (Vanguard) (1958)
- Thunder of Valmy (Macmillan) US title: Victory at Valmy (Vanguard) (1960)
- The House of Blue Dragons (Children's Newspaper - Serial 16 parts) (1960)
- The Maythorn Story (Heinemann) (1960)
- Change at Maythorn (Heinemann) (1962)
- Follow my Black Plume (Macmillan) (1963)
- A Thousand for Sicily (Macmillan) (1964)
- The Red Towers of Granada (Macmillan) (1966)
- The White Nights of St Petersburg (Macmillan) (1967)
- Horsemen on the Hills (Macmillan) (1971)
- Popinjay Stairs (Macmillan) (1972)
- The Iron Tsar (Macmillan) (1975)
- Violet for Bonaparte (Macmillan) (1976)
- The Seas of Morning (Puffin) Paperback only (1976)
- The Field of the Forty Footsteps (Macmillan) (1977)
- Mandeville (Macmillan) (1980)
- Saraband for Shadows (Macmillan) (1982)
- The Cormorant Venture (Macmillan) (1984)
- Tomorrow is a Stranger (Heinemann) (1987)
- The Arpino Assignment (Walker) (1988)
- Shadow Under the Sea (Walker) (1990)
- Calabrian Quest (Walker) (1990)
- Song for a Tattered Flag (Walker) Paperback only (1992)
- Fire on the Wind (Macmillan) (1993)
- Bring Out the Banners (Walker) (1994)
- No Horn at Midnight (Macmillan) (1995)
- Curse on the Sea (Hodder Children's Books) Paperback only (1996)
- Cloak for a Spy (Macmillan) Paperback only (1997)
- Danger in the Wings (Hodder Children's Books) (1997)

==== Young adult novels ====
- The Fair Flower of Danger (Blackwell) (1955)
- The Dutch are Coming (Hamish Hamilton) (1965)
- Bent is the Bow (Nelson) (1965)
- The Runaway Serf (Hamish Hamilton) (1968)
- A Masque for the Queen (Hamish Hamilton) (1970)
- A Ship to Rome (Heinemann) (1972)
- A Voice in the Night (Heinemann) (1973)
- The Chocolate Boy (Heinemann) (1975)
- When the Drums Beat (Heinemann) (1976)
- The Spycatchers (Hamish Hamilton) (1976)
- The Claws of the Eagle (Heinemann) (1977)
- The Running of the Deer (Hamish Hamilton) (1982)
- A Flight of Angels (Macmillan) (1989)
- Aunt Augusta's Elephant (Macmillan) (1991)
- Henry, King to Be (Macdonald Young Books) (1995)
- Page to Queen Jane (Macdonald Young Books) (1996)
- Elizabeth, Princess in Peril (Macdonald Young Books) (1997)
- Mission to Marathon (A & C Black) (1997)

==== Other children's books ====
- Red Comet: A Tale of Travel in the USSR (Lawrence) (1937)
- Fortune, My Foe: The Story of Sir Walter Raleigh (Methuen) (1949)
- The Mystery of Moorside Farm - also contains The Secret of Sharn and In the Blood (Macmillan) (1949)
- The Young Traveller in India and Pakistan (Phoenix House) (1949)
- Enjoying Books (Phoenix House) (1951)
- The Young Traveller in England and Wales (Phoenix House) (1953)
- Seven Queens of England (Heinemann) (1953)
- Seven Kings of England (Heinemann) (1955)
- The Young Traveller in Greece (Phoenix House) (1956)
- Edward Elgar, Maker of Music (Macmillan) (1960)
- The Young Writer (Nelson) (1961)
- Wolfgang Mozart : The Young Composer (Macmillan) (1961)
- Seven Stages (Heinemann) (1964)
- This is Your Century (Heinemann) (1965)
- Seven Sovereign Queens (Heinemann) (1968)
- Byron, A Poet Dangerous to Know (Macmillan) (1969)
- Days to Remember, A Garland of Historic Anniversaries (Heinemann) Short Stories (1973)
- Britain Yesterday (Basil Blackwell) (1975)
- A Wood by Moonlight and other Stories (Heinemann) Short Stories (1981)
- Timechanges: The Evolution of Everyday Life (Kingfisher) (1985)
- Looking through History: The Edwardian Era (Batsford) (1986)
- Hidden Treasure (Evans) (1989)

=== Adult writing ===
==== Novels ====
- Such Divinity (Chapman and Hall) (1939)
- Only Natural (Chapman and Hall) (1940)
- Snared Nightingale (Macmillan) (1957)
- So Wild the Heart (Macmillan) (1959)

==== Autobiography ====
- A Whiff of Burnt Boats (Macmillan) (1971)
- Laughter at the Door (Macmillan) (1974)
- Farewell the Hills (Privately Printed) (1998)

==== Other adult works ====
- The Supreme Prize (Arthur H Stockwell) Poems (c1926)
- The Unsleeping Sword (Martin Lawrence) (1934)
- Walking in England (Fenland Press) (1935)
- North Sea Spy (Fore) (1939)
- Clem Voroshilov: The Red Marshall (Pilot Press) (1940)
- Army without Banners (Fore) (1945)
- Tales Out of School (Heinemann) Revised Edition 1964 (1949)
- The Italian Story: From the Earliest Times to 1946 (Macmillan) (1963)
- The Grand Tour (Heinemann) (1967)
- Matthew Todd's Journal: A Gentleman's Gentleman in Europe 1814-1820 (Editor) (Heinemann) (1968)
- Nottingham: A Biography (Macmillan) (1970)
- The Condottieri: Soldiers of Fortune (Thames and Hudson) (1971)
- Samuel Pepys and his World (Thames and Hudson) (1972)
- D. H. Lawrence, The Phoenix and the Flame (Macmillan) Biography (1973)
- London: A Concise History (Thames and Hudson) (1975)
- Portrait of a Cavalier: William Cavendish, First Duke of Newcastle (Macmillan) Biography (1979)

=== Published plays ===
- After the Tempest (published in Best One Act Plays of 1938) (Muller) (1938)
- The Dragon Who Was Different and Other Plays for Children (Muller) (1938)
- The Shadow of Spain and Other Plays (Blackwell) (1953)

== Awards ==
- New York Herald Tribune Award for This is Your Century

== See also ==
- Rosemary Sutcliff
- Henry Treece
