= Drayneflete Revealed =

1949 book by Osbert Lancaster

The dustjacket design burlesques early 18th century English topographical views: a rarefied subject for comedy

Osbert Lancaster's Drayneflete Revealed (1949, published in the US as There'll Always be a Drayneflete 1950), is an illustrated book on architectural style.

It takes the form of a parody of an antiquarian study of an imaginary English town's development. This moves from its muddy Saxon origins — the Fleet River is the ancient river that runs in sewers under the City of London— and is profusely illustrated at each turn with Lancaster's caricature architectural views, always showing the same corner of Drayneflete, as it appears through history. Lancaster follows the changing fortunes of the architectural development from village to small city, and wittily captures the foibles and fashions of the inhabitants, all rendered in flawlessly deadpan camp.

Lancaster's Drayneflete may have taken its initial hints from a public lecture delivered in 1947 by Sir John Summerson outlining the issues in historic preservation that underlie Lancaster's comedy. Summerson described tongue-in cheek the typical English village's "laminations of architecture which would take a whole library of Mumfords to describe in detail:"

"The 'matrix' is medieval and a few Tudor gables jut out in the High Street; the one where Cromwell is conclusively proved not to have slept is an antique shop; another is the Nell Gwynne Cakery. These are the much-photographed 'old bits' The remainder of the High Street is 70 per cent Georgian—I should, perhaps, say 35 per cent, because the shopfronts have eaten up half the façades and sash windows peer over the enormous flashing fascias of the chain stores..."

Drayneflete is a fairly high-toned joke, that any reader with some experience of English architecture and the English county way-of-life and the style of English antiquarian notes about parish churches and curious village harvest traditions and the like will recognize. The sensibility resurfaced in Susan Sontag's famous 1964 Partisan Review essay and was broadened for general public consumption.

Drayneflete rated an entry in Robert Cowan's Dictionary of Urbanism. 2005 ISBN 0-9544330-0-9

The aesthetic of this haphazard jumble of a collage as an art in its own right, though seen in American contexts, was first set out by Robert Venturi and Robert A. M. Stern in the 1970s and has provided part of the context of post-Modernism.
