= Hermann Grab =

Czech writer (1903–1949)

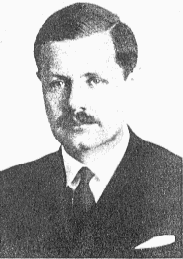
- Born: May 6, 1903
- Died: August 2, 1949 (aged 46)
- Occupations: writer, critic, musician
- Family: Richard Strauss (by marriage)
- Writing career
- Language: Bohemian German
- Years active: 1934-1949
- Notable works: Der Stradtpark, Hochzeit in Brooklyn

Hermann De Grab (May 6, 1903 – August 2, 1949) was a Bohemian German-language writer, critic and musician. He is known for writing Der Stadtpark in 1935 and Hochzeit in Brooklyn, which was published in 1957 after his death.

== Early years ==
Hermann was born into a wealthy aristocratic family of Jewish origin in Prague, Bohemian Kingdom (an old name of today's Czech Republic). Although his parents were formally Jewish, Hermann and his brother were educated as Catholics.

During his early years Grab lived in a villa owned by his family called "Grabs Vila." The vila was built by architect Josef Blecha in the 1890s for the Grab family.

Hermann studied at the German Gymnasium Na Prikopech (Prague) and then entered German Charles-Ferdinand University. Later he studied at universities in Berlin, Heidelberg and Vienna. In 1927, he received a PhD in philosophy in Heidelberg and in 1928 a PhD in law in his home-town Prague.

== Personal life ==
Grab is also a relative of fashion designer Nelly De Grab, who would design dress’s in New York City from the 1950s until her death in 1972. Grab is also a relative of photographer Richard Grab.

Grab’s cousin Alice is the daughter in law of composer Richard Strauss.

Grab married Blanche De Grab, after his death Blanche remarried to mathematician Raymond Smullyan.

== Life in Prague and writer work ==
After short juridical praxis, Grab became a music teacher and music-critic of Prager Montagsblatt. In 1934, he published the first of his short stories in Prague magazines and in 1935 his first book, Der Stadtpark, a Prague novel, for he was said to be 'Prague Proust' (Joseph Strelka).

== Exile in the United States and death ==
After the occupation of his country by Hitler between 1938 and 1939, Grab escaped to Paris. When Hitler's armies defeated France, he escaped (and lost all his manuscripts) through France, Spain, Portugal, and finally to the United States. Hermann settled in New York City and established a small music school, married a Belgian exile named Blanche and wrote his second book, Hochzeit in Brooklyn.

Serious illness prevented him from returning to Prague after World War II. Hermann was diagnosed with cancer in 1946. He died of cancer fully invalid on August 2, 1949.

== Works ==
- Der Stadtpark (Town Park), novel published in Prague 1935. Prague's pre-World War I life seen by a teenager.
- Hochzeit in Brooklyn (Marriage in Brooklyn), a book of excellent short stories, written in 1940s, published posthumously in Vienna 1957. Some of them with a Prague theme, others with New York and Lisbon theme.

== Secondary literature ==
- "Das neue Weihnachtsbuch. Thomas Mann über ein neues Prager Buch". In: Prager Montagsblatt 57 (1934), No.50 (10. 12. 1934), p. 8.
- Haas, Willy: "Pražský Němec 1935". [A German of Prague 1935.] In: Literární noviny [Literary Review] 7 (1935), No. 4, p. 3.
- Mann, Klaus: "Hermann Grab, Der Stadtpark". In: Die Sammlung 2 (1935), No. 7, p. 387 – 389.
- C. S. [d.i. Carl Seelig]: "Der Stadtpark von Hermann Grab". In: Neue Zürcher Zeitung 156 (1935), No. 770, Beilage
- Politzer, Heinz: "Hermann Grab: Der Stadtpark". In: das silberboot 1 (1935/1936), fasc. 1, p. 46 – 47.
- Strelka, Joseph P.: "Ein österreichischer Proust". In: Strelka: Brücke zu vielen Ufern. Wien, Frankfurt, Zürich 1966, p. 119.
- Härtling, Peter: "Hermann Grab: Der Stadtpark". In: Härtling: Vergessene Bücher. Stuttgart 1966, p. 143 – 150. (2nd ed. Munich 1986, p. 197 – 205.)
- Becher, Peter: "Schreiben am Abgrund. Hermann Grab – ein Erzähler aus dem Prager Kreis". In: Süddeutsche Zeitung 41 (1985), Nr. 117 (22. 5. 1985), S. 13.
- Bonsen, Peter: "Zweifelhaftes Glück. Der Exilautor Hermann Grab – eine Wiederentdeckung". In: Rhein-Neckar-Zeitung. Heidelberger Nachrichten 41 (1985), No. 183.
- Weinzierl, Ulrich: "Der kunstvoll gedämpfte Schrecken". In: Frankfurter Allgemeine Zeitung 1985, No. 98 (27. 4. 1985). Beilage Bilder und Zeiten – Literatur, p. 5.
- Unger, Karl: "Planvoll beschädigte Novellen. Der Stadtpark, Erzählungen von Hermann Grab". In: Deutsche Volkszeitung 1985, Nr.31 (2. 8. 1985), S. 12.
- Adler, Jeremy: "Hermann Grab: Der Stadtpark". In: Times Literary Supplement 84 (1985), No. 4306 (11. 10. 1985), p. 1146.
- Adler, H. G.: Der Stadtpark und andere Erzählungen. In: Literatur und Kritik 21 (1986), fasc. 205 – 206, p. 273 – 275.
- Theodor W. Adorno: "Hermann Grab". In: Theodor Adorno, Gesammelte Schriften, Suhrkamp, Frankfurt/M.
- Theodor Adorno: Vermischte Schriften, 1986, ISBN 3-518-57809-X S. 465 f.
- Karl Hobi: Hermann Grab. Leben und Werk, PhD Thesis, Fribourg (Switzerland) 1969.
- Ernst Schönwiese: "Hermann Grab" In: Wort in der Zeit 4 (1958), S. 257 ff.
- Handbuch österreichischer Autorinnen und Autoren jüdischer Herkunft 18. bis 20. Jahrhundert. Band 1. Hrsg. Österreichische Nationalbibliothek, Wien. Redaktion: Susanne Blumesberger. Saur, München 2002, S. 452, ISBN 3-598-11545-8.
- Lucy Topol’ská: Hermann Grab. Biographie
