= Peter Gutmann (journalist) =

American lawyer

Peter Gutmann (born August 3, 1949 in New York City) is an American journalist and attorney. He graduated from Wesleyan University, cum laude, with a B.A. in 1971, and attended the University of North Carolina, where he earned a M.A. in Communications in 1974. He earned a J.D. from George Washington University in 1978.

== Journalist ==
Gutmann writes extensively on classical music for publication in newspapers and magazines. His work as earned him several awards: most recently, a 2006 Dateline Award for Excellence in Local Journalism for Weekly Newspaper Arts Criticism from the Washington Chapter of the Society of Professional Journalists. He also won Dateline Awards in 2002, 2003 and 2004 from the Washington, DC chapter of the Society of Professional Journalists. Gutmann has two long-standing, regular columns:

- "Classical Notes", Goldmine magazine, 1998–present
- "After Hours", Legal Times, 2000–present

== Attorney ==
Gutmann practices law in the Washington, D.C. office of Womble Carlyle Sandridge & Rice, PLLC, where he provides legal and practical advice on all aspects of broadcasting.
