= Paul Winterton =

English writer (1908–2001)

Paul Winterton (12 February 1908 – 8 January 2001) was an English journalist and crime novelist. During his career he used the pseudonyms Andrew Garve, Roger Bax and Paul Somers.

Winterton was born in Leicester, the son of Ernest Winterton, a left-wing journalist and the Labour Member of Parliament for Loughborough from 1929 to 1931. He was educated at Hulme Grammar School in Manchester and Purley County School in Surrey. He took a degree in Economics at the London School of Economics. He was a reporter for The Economist for four years, and later for the News Chronicle (1933 - 1946). From 1942 to 1945 he was the Moscow correspondent of the News Chronicle, where he was also the correspondent of the BBC Overseas Service.

Winterton was the Labour candidate for Canterbury in the 1931 general election, and for Mitcham in the 1935 general election.

After the war Winterton became an author of crime and mystery fiction full-time. In 1952 he was elected to the Detection Club at the same time as Eric Ambler. He was a founder-member of the Crime Writers' Association during 1953 and, with Elizabeth Ferrars, its first joint secretary.

Inspector James was his protagonist for the Roger Bax books. Hugh Curtis was his protagonist for the Paul Somers books.

Winterton was married and had two sons and two daughters.

== Filmography ==
- Never Let Me Go (1953) (novel Came the Dawn)
- The Alfred Hitchcock Hour (2 TV episodes, 1962) :
  - "House Guest" (novel The Golden Deed)
  - "Night of the Owl" (novel End of the Track)
- Two Letter Alibi (1962) (novel Death and the Sky Above)
- A Touch of Larceny (1959) (novel The Megstone Plot)
- The Desperate Man (1959) (novel Beginner's Luck)

== Bibliography ==
=== Non-fiction ===
- Report on Russia (1945)
- Inquest on an Ally (1948)

=== Novels ===
- Death Beneath Jerusalem (1938) (writing as Roger Bax)
- Red Escapade (1940) (writing as Roger Bax)
- Disposing of Henry (1947) (writing as Roger Bax)
- Blueprint for Murder (1948) (writing as Roger Bax)
  - aka The Trouble with Murder
- Came the Dawn (1949) (writing as Roger Bax)
  - aka Two If by Sea
- No Mask for Murder (1950)
  - aka Fontego's Folly
- No Tears for Hilda (1950)
- A Press of Suspects (1951)
  - aka By-Line for Murder
- Murder in Moscow (1951)
  - aka Murder Through the Looking Glass
- A Grave Case of Murder (1951) (writing as Roger Bax)
- A Hole in the Ground (1952)
- The Cuckoo Line Affair (1953)
- Death and the Sky Above (1953)
- The Riddle of Samson (1954)
- The End of the Track (1955)
- The Megstone Plot (1956)
- The Narrow Search (1957)
- The Galloway Case (1958)
- Beginner's Luck (1958) (writing as Paul Somers)
- Operation Piracy (1958) (writing as Paul Somers)
- A Hero for Leanda (1959)
- The Shivering Mountain (1959) (writing as Paul Somers)
- The Golden Deed (1960)
- The Far Sands (1961)
- The Broken Jigsaw (1961) (writing as Paul Somers)
- The House of Soldiers (1962)
- Prisoner's Friend (1962)
- The Sea Monks (1963)
- Frame-Up (1964)
- The Ashes of Loda (1965)
- Murderer's Fen (1966)
  - aka Hide and Go Seek
- A Very Quiet Place (1967)
- The Long Short Cut (1968)
- The Ascent of D-13 (1969)
- Boomerang (1970)
- The Late Bill Smith (1971)
- The Case of Robert Quarry (1972)
- The File on Lester (1974)
  - aka The Lester Affair
- Home to Roost (1976)
- Counterstroke (1978)
