= The Daemon Lover =

Traditional song

"The Daemon Lover" (Roud 14, Child 243) – also known as "James Harris", "A Warning for Married Women", "The Distressed Ship Carpenter", "James Herries", "The Carpenter’s Wife", "The Banks of Italy", or "The House-Carpenter" – is a popular ballad dating from England of the mid-seventeenth century, when the earliest known broadside version of the ballad was entered in the Stationers' Register on 21 February 1657. There are different versions of the tale, which typically describe a married woman who is lured from her home and family by a demon who masquerades as a former lover.

== History and different versions ==
There are a number of different versions of the ballad. In addition to the eight collected by Francis James Child in volume IV of his anthology The English and Scottish Popular Ballads (versions A to H), others can be found in Britain and in the United States, where it remained especially widespread, with hundreds of versions being collected throughout the years, around 250 of them in print. In comparison, only four new variants were recorded in the UK in the time between Child's death in 1896 and the second half of the 1960s, all of them before 1910.

=== "A Warning for Married Women" (Child A) ===
The oldest version of the ballad – labeled 243 A in Child's anthology and originally signed with the initials L.P. – is generally attributed to Laurence Price, a prominent ballad writer of that time. The original, full title of the broadside was "A Warning for Married Women, by the example of Mrs. Jane Renalds, a West-Country woman born neer unto Plymouth, who having plighted her troth to a seaman, was afterwards married to a carpenter, and at last carried away by a spirit, the manner how shall be presently recited". The broadside does not seem to be a recasting of a pre-existing folk ballad in circulation, although it bears some similarities to other ballads, most notably a similarly named "A Warning for Maidens", also known by the title "Bateman's Tragedy" (Roud 22132).

"A Warning for Married Women" tells the story of Jane Reynolds and her lover James Harris, with whom she exchanged a promise of marriage. He is pressed as a sailor before the wedding takes place and Jane faithfully awaits his return for three years, but when she learns of his death at sea, she agrees to marry a local carpenter. Jane gives birth to three children and for four years the couple lives a happy life. One night, when the carpenter is away, the spirit of James Harris appears. He tries to convince Jane to keep her oath and run away with him. At first she is reluctant to do so, because of her husband and their children, but ultimately she succumbs to the ghost's pleas, letting herself be persuaded by his tales of rejecting the royal daughter's hand and assurance that he has the means to support her – namely, a fleet of seven ships. The pair then leaves England, never to be seen again, and the carpenter commits suicide upon learning that his wife is gone. The broadside ends with a mention that although the children were orphaned, the heavenly powers will provide for them.

=== "The Distressed Ship Carpenter" (Child B) ===
Another known version of the ballad, labeled 243 B in Child's anthology and titled ‘The Distressed Ship Carpenter’, comes from the mid-eighteenth century and appears in A Collection of Diverting Songs, Epigrams, & c. and in a chapbook titled The Rambler’s Garland. It is notable for its opening, ‘Well met, well met, my own true love’, which is characteristic of many versions of the ballad, in particular those recorded in America. This variation differs from "A Warning for Married Women". The opening part of the ballad is lost, and so are the names of Jane and James; the text does not mention their former vows either. The former lover appears to be a mortal man, rather than a revenant. "The Distressed Ship Carpenter" ends with the eponymous craftsman lamenting and cursing seamen for ruining his life. With the disappearance of the supernatural elements, the story of the ballad became rationalized. These changes may have originated in an oral tradition or, as suggested by John Burrison, there was an intermediary broadside version of the ballad that served as a bridge between "A Warning’" and "The Distressed Ship Carpenter"; David Atkinson considers a possibility that the changes were made either to avoid any legal troubles with the intellectual property owners of "A Warning" or as a result of a change in broadside format to smaller sheets.

"The Distressed Ship Carpenter" is characterized by a number of common folk touches, possibly indicating that there was an intermediary folk version developed as a result of an oral tradition between this version of the ballad and the original broadside. The story begins in the third act, contains recurring words and phrases and is leaping and lingering, i.e. alternating between rapid and slow unfoldment of the events, at two crucial points: when relating the return of the former lover and the lovers’ confrontation after they board the ship. In doing so, the ballad preserves and focuses on its "emotional core".

=== Scottish and American traditions ===
"A Warning for Married Women" and "The Distressed Ship Carpenter" seem to have inspired the Scottish and American traditions of the ballad, respectively. The Scottish versions collected by Child (designated as versions C-G) share a number of elements with Child 243 A not present in Child 243 B – among them a direct reference to former vows and the name of the sailor – but what distinguishes them most is the character of a lover, who regains his supernatural nature. What is especially characteristic of these versions is the introduction of a daemonic presence; in "The Daemon Lover" (Child 243 E, F, G) James Harris is no longer a ghost or a mortal man, but instead is revealed to be a cloven-footed devil.

It is generally agreed that copies collected in America (usually titled "The House Carpenter") were derived from "The Distressed Ship Carpenter". There are a number of similarities between these versions – such as the absence of former vows and supernatural elements characteristic of "A Warning" and Scottish versions – and the story presented in them remains essentially the same. Some elements taken from the Scottish tradition are present in American variants, for example "hills of heaven, hills of hell" line from Child 243 E, but the influence of "The Distressed Ship Carpenter" is prevalent. The most notable differences when compared to the English and Scottish traditions are their setting (i.e. "the banks of Italy" become "the banks of old Tennessee") and more emphasis being put on the relationship between the mother and the child and their subsequent parting. The American history of the ballad in printed form dates back to the 1850s. Two verses that were printed in Philadelphia (1858; Child included them in his anthology), along with a broadside printed by Andrews of New York (ca. 1857; reissued by De Marsan in 1860) are the earliest known examples of the ballad in the United States, although the oral tradition had already existed there before they were published and it played a predominant role in the spread of the ballad in America.

== Tune and metre ==
Referring to broadsides that were already in circulation for the tune was a common habit and so the original broadsides of "A Warning for Married Women" name the tune to which the ballad was to be sung as "The Fair Maid of Bristol", "Bateman", or "John True". These three tunes are also identified as "The Lady’s Fall", which was notably the tune for "Bateman’s Tragedy" (Roud 22132) and numerous other early seventeenth-century broadsides, most of which contained themes of "crimes, monstrous births, or warnings of God’s judgement." Later, eighteenth-century copies of "The Distressed Ship Carpenter" carried no tune designation whatsoever. "A Warning for Married Women" and "The Distressed Ship Carpenter" were printed respectively in 32 four-line stanzas (in ballad metre) and 13 to 14 four-line stanzas (in long measure, described by Atkinson as “slightly awkward” at times).

== Themes ==
"A Warning for Married Women" addresses the themes of marriage, unfaithfulness and bigamy. David Atkinson writes that it can be seen as "a reinforcement of prevailing patriarchal family relationships." Barbara Fass Leavy describes Jane Reynolds as a "cautionary example" of what happens "when women abandon their responsibilities in order to pursue their own pleasures." The theme of materialism is prevalent throughout the different versions, as the wife usually remains concerned whether her lover will be able to maintain her. Likewise, he uses promises of prosperity as a way to seduce her. Leavy also suggests a different reading of the ballad, in which it is her marriage with a carpenter, rather than her decision to flee with the former lover, that can be considered an act of infidelity. Atkinson describes the original broadside as "the preservation of outmoded ways of thinking within the canon of popular literature." In accordance with the ecclesiastical law of early seventeenth-century England, a mutual promise of marriage was enough to make the couple husband and wife and was considered binding in the eyes of God. As a result, breaking such a promise would make any subsequent marriage invalid and invite divine punishment. The ballad therefore employs "popular theology to reinforce [its] emphasis on fidelity in marriage." The broadside may be read as encouraging faithfulness to the person with whom the original pre-marriage vows were exchanged and warning against divine punishment for breaking the oath.

The changes resulting from the recasting of "A Warning for Married Women" as "The Distressed Ship Carpenter" can be seen as the reflection of "a genuine, if quite gradual, change in social and judicial attitudes in early modern England." The revenant becomes a former lover and crime and punishment take the place of sin and retribution. The theme of sin becomes notable once again in the Scottish "Demon Lover" tradition (notably Child D-G), which establishes that the former lover is the devil who "came to carry off the unfaithful girl to the hills of hell." The imagery of the "hills of heaven and hell" is present in some of the variants collected in America. Alan Lomax describes the ballad as a reinforcement of the Calvinist sexual morality.

The ballad also touches on the issues of class relations. According to Dave Harker, "A Warning for Married Women" questions the responsibilities of young women "of worthy birth and fame". In her reading of the ballad, Leavy mentions the binary opposition between the husband and the lover and two modes of existence they represent; the mundane life and domestic ties of the artisan and the life of adventure and freedom of the seaman.

Many supernatural ballads mention fictional or remote places as locations. In multiple variants of the ballad, James Harris promises to take his lover to "the banks of Italie", which is a real, but sufficiently far-off place to serve as the final destination for an unfaithful wife and her supernatural lover. In other versions, the banks of Italy turn into, for example, the banks of Tennessee (in this version the destination becomes a familiar place to return to), various generalizations ("deep blue sea", "salt water sea") or abstractions ("isle of sweet liberty", "banks of sweet relief").

== Traditional recordings ==
The ballad was collected and recorded many times in the Appalachian Mountains; Clarence Ashley recorded a version with a banjo accompaniment in 1930, Texas Gladden had two versions recorded in 1932 and 1946, whilst Sarah Ogan Gunning sang a version in 1974. Jean Ritchie sang her family's version of the ballad twice, one of those times recorded by Alan Lomax, now available online courtesy of the Alan Lomax archive. The song was also popular elsewhere in the United States; Ozark singer Almeda Riddle sang another traditional version in 1964, and folklorist Max Hunter recorded several Ozark versions which are available on the online Max Hunter Folk Collection.

Canadian folklorists Edith Fowke, Kenneth Peacock and Helen Creighton each recorded a different "House Carpenter" variant in Canada in the 1950s and 60s.

The song appears to have been largely forgotten in Britain and Ireland, but a fragmentary version, sung by Andrew Stewart of Blairgowrie, Perthshire, Scotland, and learned from his mother, was recorded by Hamish Henderson in 1955, and can be heard on the Tobar an Dualchais website. A variant performed by Frank Browne in Bellanagare, Co. Roscommon, Ireland, was also recorded in 1975 by Hugh Shields.

== Popular recordings ==
Versions of the song, under its several titles, have been recorded by:

- Alasdair Roberts
- Andy Irvine
- Augie March - re-written as "Men Who Follow Spring The Planet 'Round"
- Battlefield Band - "The Devil's Courtship"
- Bob Dylan recorded the version "House Carpenter" in 1961.
- Buffy Sainte-Marie
- Clarence Ashley
- Custer Larue
- Daithi Sproule
- Damien Jurado
- Dave Van Ronk
- David Grisman
- Dervish - "Sweet Viledee"
- Doc Watson
- Ewan MacColl
- Eleanor Tomlinson
- Faun Fables
- The Handsome Family
- Hurt
- Jean Ritchie
- Jeff Lang
- Joan Baez
- Kelly Joe Phelps
- Kim Larsen - re-written as "Byens Hotel" in 1973
- Kornog
- Lisa Moscatiello
- Martin Simpson
- Mr. Fox
- Myrkur - "House Carpenter"
- Natalie Merchant
- Mick McAuley
- Nephew - cover of Kim Larsen's song
- Nic Jones
- Nickel Creek - “House Carpenter”
- Oakley Hall
- Paul Simon
- Pentangle
- Peter Bellamy
- Peggy Seeger
- Pete Seeger
- Punch Brothers - "House Carpenter / Jerusalem Ridge"
- Richard Dyer-Bennet
- Steeleye Span
- SubRosa - "House Carpenter"
- Superwolf
- Sweeney's Men
- Texas Gladden
- The Baltimore Consort
- The Carolina Tar Heels
- The Ex
- The Mammals
- Tim O'Brien
- Tony Rice
- Cornelis Vreeswijk - "Somliga går med trasiga skor"

== In literature ==
Elizabeth Bowen's 1945 short story "The Demon Lover" uses the ballad's central conceit for a narrative of ghostly return in wartime London.

Shirley Jackson's collection The Lottery and Other Stories includes "The Daemon Lover", a story about a woman searching for her mysterious fiancé named James Harris.

In Grady Hendrix’s 2020 novel The Southern Book Club's Guide to Slaying Vampires, the main antagonist is a vampire named James Harris as a way to pay ode to the ballad.

== In classical music ==
Hamish MacCunn's 1887 concert overture The Ship o' the Fiend is based on the ballad.
