= The Lottery and Other Stories =

1949 short story collection by Shirley Jackson

- First edition cover
- Author: Shirley Jackson
- Language: English
- Genre: Horror
- Publisher: Farrar, Straus and Company
- Publication date: 1949
- Publication place: United States
- Media type: Print (hardcover)
- Pages: 306 pp

The Lottery and Other Stories is a 1949 short story collection by American author Shirley Jackson. Published by Farrar, Straus, it includes "The Lottery" and 24 other stories. This was the only collection of her stories to appear during her lifetime. Her later posthumous collections were Come Along with Me (Viking, 1968), edited by Stanley Edgar Hyman, and Just an Ordinary Day (Bantam, 1995) and Let Me Tell You (Random House, 2015), edited by her children Laurence Jackson Hyman and Sarah Hyman Stewart.

Jackson's original title for this collection was The Lottery or, The Adventures of James Harris. Characters named James Harris appear in the stories "The Daemon Lover", "Like Mother Used to Make", "Elizabeth" and "Of Course." Other characters with the surname Harris appear or are referenced in "The Villager", "The Renegade", "Flower Garden", "A Fine Old Firm" and "Seven Types of Ambiguity." The collection also contains a short excerpt from the traditional ballad "The Daemon Lover", in which the title character's name is James Harris.

The book bears the dedication "For my mother and father".

== Contents ==
The second, third, and fourth sections are prefaced by quotations from Saducismus Triumphatus, a 17th-century book about witchcraft, by Joseph Glanvill.

I

- "The Intoxicated"
- "The Daemon Lover"
- "Like Mother Used to Make"
- "Trial by Combat"
- "The Villager"
- "My Life with R. H. Macy"

II

- "The Witch"
- "The Renegade"
- "After You, My Dear Alphonse"
- "Charles"
- "Afternoon in Linen"
- "Flower Garden"
- "Dorothy and My Grandmother and the Sailors"

III

- "Colloquy"
- "Elizabeth"
- "A Fine Old Firm"
- "The Dummy"
- "Seven Types of Ambiguity"
- "Come Dance with Me in Ireland"

IV

- "Of Course"
- "Pillar of Salt"
- "Men with Their Big Shoes"
- "The Tooth"
- "Got a Letter from Jimmy"
- "The Lottery"

V

- "Epilogue"

== Reception ==
Anthony Boucher and J. Francis McComas praised the volume as "a brilliant collection of naturalistic glimpses of a world with terrifying holes in it."

Reappraising the book in 2011 for The Guardian, Stephanie Cross wrote:

The title story might be the one for which Shirley Jackson is famed but, as this volume suggests, it was not entirely typical of her oeuvre. First published in 1948, "The Lottery" details a long-established rite that culminates in murder. Elsewhere, however, Jackson aims to disquiet rather than shock: the threat is often latent in Jackson's work, as Donna Tartt has observed. The weird farming community of "The Lottery" seems likewise anomalous: Jackson's protagonists tend to be mothers, or women starting their homemaking careers [...] There is sparkling comedy in this collection, as well as glimpses of Jackson the horror novelist [...] But there are also subtle studies of disillusionment and snobbery – Jackson is a sympathetic, penetrating observer of the domestic mundane – and, most notably in "Flower Garden", of racism. [...] Some short stories snap shut like traps – not Jackson's. Nevertheless, the way that they slide into place seems equally fated and final.

== See also ==
- "The Daemon Lover"
- Macy's
- Alphonse and Gaston
- Seven Types of Ambiguity
