= Male and Female: A Study of the Sexes in a Changing World =

1949 book by Margaret Mead

- Cover of the first edition
- Author: Margaret Mead
- Language: English
- Publisher: William Morrow and Company
- Publication date: 1949
- Publication place: United States
- Media type: Print

Male and Female: A Study of the Sexes in a Changing World is a 1949 book by the American anthropologist Margaret Mead. It is a comparative study of tribal men and women on seven Pacific islands and men and women in the United States.
