= Russell Doubleday =

Russell Doubleday (May 26, 1872 in Brooklyn – June 14, 1949 at Glen Cove, Long Island) was an American writer, editor and publisher. He was the brother of Frank Nelson Doubleday, and son of William Edwards Doubleday and Ellen Maria "Ella" Dickinson.

Doubleday served in the naval militia in the Spanish–American War. From 1909 to 1912, he was the advertising manager for his brother's publishing firm, Doubleday, Page & Company. Later, he was its vice-president, secretary and a director. For much of his career, Doubleday was director of the editorial department. For a time after 1928, he edited the magazine, World's Work.

== Bibliography ==
- A Gunner Aboard the Yankee (1898)
- Cattle Ranch to College (1899)
- A Year in a Yawl (1901)
- Stories of Inventors (1904)
- Photography is Fun (1938)
- Long Island (1939)
- Tree Neighbors (1940)
