= Radu Țuculescu =

Romanian novelist and playwright (1949–2025)

Radu Țuculescu (1 January 1949 – 25 March 2025) was a Romanian novelist, playwright, translator, journalist and theatre director.

Țuculescu belonged to the so-called "1980s generation" from Romania.

== Background ==
Țuculescu was born in Târgu Mureș on 1 January 1949, and graduated from the Gheorghe Dima Music Academy in Cluj. He was the nephew of painter Ion Țuculescu, and the father of writer Răzvan Țuculescu.

Țuculescu died on 25 March 2025, at the age of 76.

== Career ==
His novels are translated and published in Austria, France, Czech Republic, Italy, Germany, Bulgaria, Hungary, Serbia and Israel. His theatrical plays are performed in many languages such as Italian, English, Czech, Hebrew and Hungarian. The “Grădina de vară sau Hai să-i batem” theatrical play was put in scene for the first time in Prague, at the Orfeus Theatre, on 29 January 2008, and is still enjoying significant success, along with his later comedy “O balegă în mijlocul drumului.”

”Mère-vieille racontait" (Povestirile mameibatrane, in Romanian) is Radu Țuculescu's novel published by "Cartea Romaneasca" in Bucharest in 2006. The novel became an instant best seller in Romania and surely added quite a lot of recognition to the already famous novelist and playwright Radu Țuculescu. Although unavailable in English, the novel has been earmarked for an English translation. The setting of the novel is this Transylvanian time-frozen village, Petrinzel or Petra in the novel, where nothing happens and where time seems of no essence. The village and the nature surrounding it seem quite pristine, untouched, unharmed, but it can also be harmful at times. The villagers who are mostly old and few, are themselves looking like people descended from a totally unreal world. People like the local Hungarian priest Tothjanos has willingly or unwillingly become not only a soothing pastor but also a much appreciated playboy in his little community. Rosamunda, the woman who castrates the village hogs has turned into some Gorgonian figure whom all the men are fearful of. Margolili, the most beautiful and lustful woman in this village, the woman who has known almost all local men, suddenly and mysteriously disappears leaving behind her a heavy trail of suspense and guilt. But the most important, enigmatic and gifted character is the old mother who at seventy-five decides to read any literature she can lay her hands upon. Therefore, she reads Shakespeare, Bulgakov, Tolstoy and others retelling and reinventing the stories by using her natural and extremely rich imagination, by interweaving the stories she read with the ones she invented and came up with, from her own life. It is certainly a community dominated by its women. Sometimes the reader has this déjà-vu sensation of a Gogolian village or maybe the spiritual and mystic shtetls in Isaac Bashevis Singer, but one thing is certain – any open-minded reader will get this unique opportunity to take a good glimpse into Transylvania's rich cultural, literary and dramatic heritage.

== Awards ==
- The Book of the Year, 2009, 2012, 2017
- Special Prize, 1994, for Transilvania în... Spania
- Writers' Union Award, Cluj branch, 1984, 1995, 2005
- Special Prize at the Transylvania International Book Festival 2017 for the novel The Kennedy Butchery

== List of works ==
- Portocale și cascadori (short prose, 1978)
- Grădina suspendată (short stories, 1981)
- Vânzătorul de aripi (novel, 1982)
- Ora păianjenului (novel, 1984)
- Degetele lui Marsias (novel, 1985)
- Portrete în mișcare (short prose, 1986)
- Umbra penei de gâscă (novel, 1991)
- Cuptorul cu microunde (short prose, 1995)
- Uscătoria de partid (short prose, 1997)
- Aventuri în anticameră (diary, 2001)
- Liften (short prose, Zalaegerszeg-Ungaria, 1996, transl. Szlafkay Attila)
- Ce dracu se întâmplă cu trenul acesta? (theatre, 2004)
- Teatrul transilvan la începutul mileniului III (theatrical chronicle, 2004)
- Povestirile mameibătrâne (novel, 2006)
- Der Mikrowellenherd (der Roman Eines Plattenbaus in zehn Aufzugen) - Lehner - Vienna, 2008 trad. Zorin Diaconescu
- Stalin cu sapa-nainte (novel, 2009)
- Bravul nostru Micsa (theatrical plays, 2010)
- Romanul erectil- publicistica (chronicles, 2010)
- Femeile insomniacului (novel, 2012)
- Mere-vieille racontait (novel, Gingko Edition, Paris 2012, trad. Dominique Ilea)
- Stalin con la zappa in spalla - Aracne editrice, 2013, transl. Danilo De Salazar

== Translations ==
- America nu există ("America does not exist"), anthology of German-language prose writers from Switzerland, Oradea, 1998
