= No Boats on Bannermere =

1949 novel by Geoffrey Trease

- First edition cover
- Author: Geoffrey Trease
- Illustrator: Richard Kennedy
- Language: English
- Genre: children's fiction
- Publisher: Heinemann
- Publication date: 1949
- Followed by: Under Black Banner

No Boats on Bannermere is a 1949 children's novel by Geoffrey Trease, and the first of his five Bannerdale novels. They are school stories set in Cumberland, in the Lake District.

== Plot summary ==
William (Bill) Melbury and his younger sister Susan live with their mother (divorced – their father left and doesn't keep in contact or send any support) in grotty rented digs in post-war London. His mother inherits a cottage from her second cousin; but only if she lives in it for five years. Cousin Fay disliked week-enders and wanted Beckfoot Cottage to be lived in. So they move from the south of England to the cottage in Bannermere, Upper Bannerdale.

William and Susan transfer to schools at Winthwaite five miles away, a boy's grammar school and a county secondary school. Bill befriends Tim Darren and Sue befriends Penelope (Penny) Morchard at their respective schools. Bill finds that Cousin Fay also owns a rowboat and they row to the island of Brant Holm in the lake. But the owner of Bannermere Hall stops his tenant the farmer Mr Tyler leasing them the boathouse by the lake. Sir Alfred Askew only bought the property last year when he retired from India, but is determined to play the local squire, complete with monocle.

They suspect Sir Alfred of something, go into his woods, and find that he has uncovered an ancient buried skeleton on the lakeside. There are actually five skeletons, possibly from the 9th century during the period of Viking raids, and Sir Alfred has not notified the police of the find. An inquest is held. Later when Bill sees an aerial photo of the lake, he sees shading indicating a burial on the island in the lake. They investigate, and uncover a buried skeleton, but are interrupted by Sir Alfred and his friend Matson an antique-dealer. There are also some silver dishes and flagons, probably the monastery treasure mentioned in an old chronicle of St Coloumbs Abbey in Yorkshire. At the inquest they are deemed treasure trove, as the skeleton was Christian and buried facing east with hands crossed on the breast (as proved by Tim's photo). As finders the four get three hundred pounds reward each. Sir Alfred claimed it could have been a heathen burial by Norsemen with the items buried publicly; as at Sutton Hoo the items would not be treasure trove but would belong to the landowner. Matson would have sold them for a high price in America.

== Bannermere and Bannerdale ==
In the series, the hamlet of Bannermere is in Upper Bannerdale, and on Bannermere, a lake. Black Banner, a 2783-foot mountain is across the lake. Trease wrote about Bannerdale that in 1940 when he went to teach at a private school in Gosforth three miles inland from Seascale while waiting to be called up:

I had come, all unknowing, to Bannerdale, about which, in the years to come, I was going to write. ... Bannermere will not be found on any map. There is a Banner Dale, scarcely more than a mile long, just east of Saddleback and Bannerdale Crags looking down on it, but I have never seen them. My own Bannerdale, with its lake and forbidden islet and its sombre mountain Black Banner lowering over it is one of those private fantasy regions that authors, and especially children's authors love to create. It is a pastiche, three parts Wasdale, one part Eskdale, with bits and pieces from elsewhere. The 'Gates of Bannerdale' were taken from the Jaws of Borrowdale, 'Black Banner' was suggested by the real mountain, Black Sails, and my little town of 'Winthwaite' is Cockermouth, shifted southwards for literary convenience ... Nowadays ... it does not 'exist merely in my own mind' but exists also in the minds of a lot of people who, in childhood or later, have read the stories I laid there. Not only British children, but – oddly and gratifyingly – Japanese, Swedes, Brazilians and others equally remote.

== Social setting ==
Trease is known for his children's historical novels, but the Bannerdale novels are school stories set in the present and in day schools. The novel revolves around two boys and two girls. Bill and Sue's mother is divorced or separated and wears slacks: It’s not every chap’s mother who can wear them. Mum can. The book only mentions family difficulties, which meant several moves. Kingsland, the Grammar headmaster, is old-fashioned, but caring of his pupils. He disdains the County Sec, but finds that Miss Florey, the headmistress, has worked for an archaeologist he admires. William is in the middle school at the Grammar, and notices that Penny is attractive (Tim does not). William wants to be an author, and buys a typewriter from his share of the reward.

Trease talked on children's books, and went to Millom in west Cumberland. He was approached after a lecture for (largely unappreciative) schoolchildren:

Two schoolgirls buttonholed me afterwards. 'Do you ever write school stories?’ 'No' I said. 'Haven’t you got enough already? All those midnight feasts in the dorm, those secret passages and hooded figures -’ They cut me off with grave courtesy, 'They didn’t mean that stuff. Why didn’t I write true-to-life stories, about real boys and girls, going to day-schools as nearly everybody did? No one seemed to write that sort.' Out of that five-minute conversation came, a year or two later, No Boats on Bannermere and eventually its four sequels, three hundred thousand words, the writing spread intermittently over nine years, I was glad I had been to Millom.

== Bannerdale novels ==
The five novels in the Bannerdale series are:

- No Boats on Bannermere (Heinemann) (1949)
- Under Black Banner (Heinemann) (1951)
- Black Banner Players (Heinemann) (1952)
- Black Banner Abroad (Heinemann) (1954)
- The Gates of Bannerdale (Heinemann) (1956)
