= Élmer Mendoza =

Mexican author (born 1949)

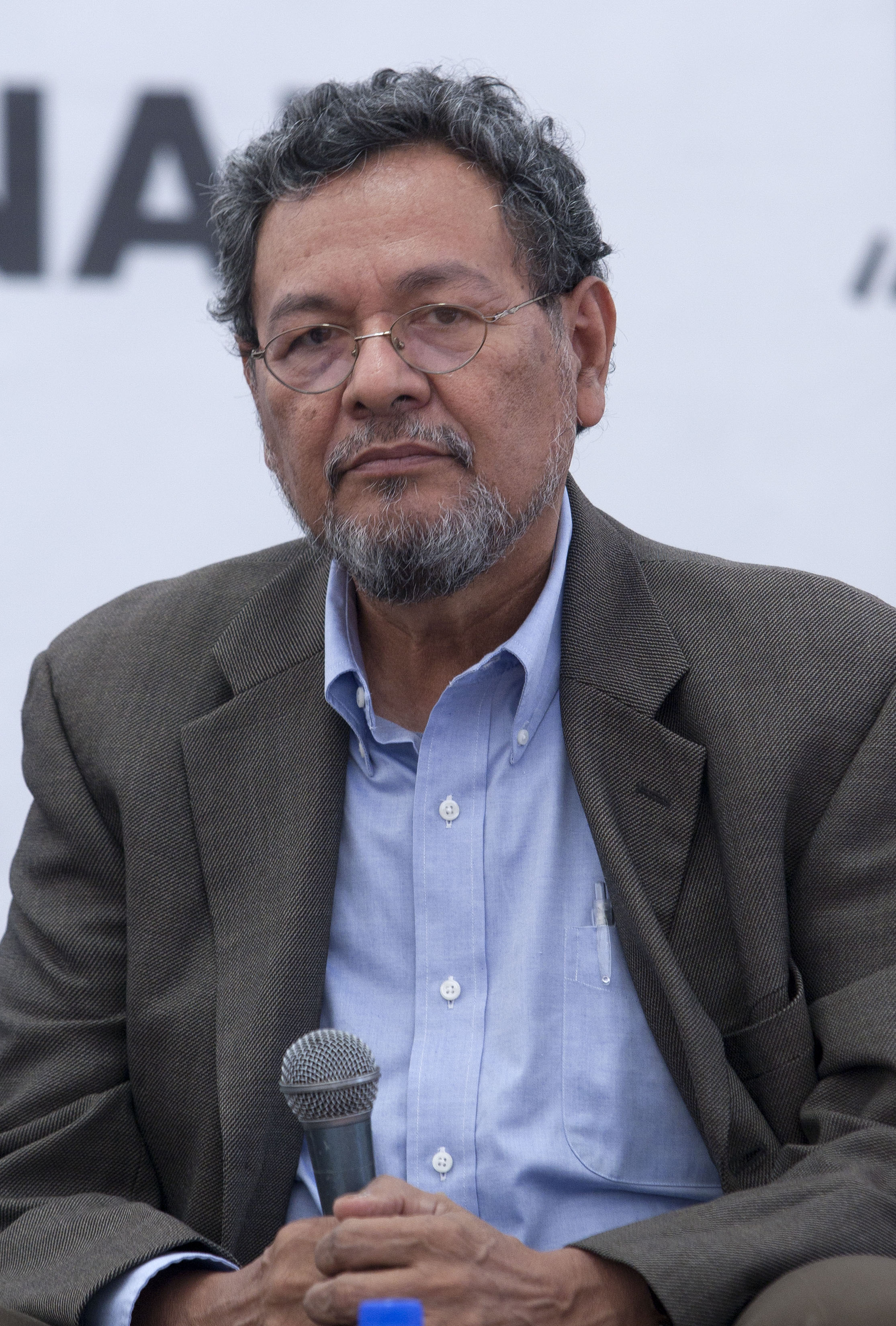
- Born: 6 December 1949 (age 76); Culiacan, Mexico
- Occupation: Writer

Élmer Mendoza (born 6 December 1949) is a Mexican author. He is one of the key figures in the genre known as narcoliterature (or narco-lit). A dramatist and short story writer, he is known above all for his novels, several of which feature the detective Edgar El Zurdo Mendieta.

== Career ==
Élmer Mendoza appeared on the Mexican literary scene in 1978, publishing his first short story collection. He followed his literary debut with a prolific career. Between 1978 and 1995 he published five volumes of short stories. Then, in 1999, came his first novel, entitled Un asesino solitario (A Lone Murderer). The book received positive reviews, and the Mexican critic Federico Campbell described Mendoza as “the first narrator to correctly reflect the effect of drug culture in our country.”

== Other work ==
Beside being a best-selling author, Mendoza is also a professor of literature at the Autonomous University of Sinaloa. He is one of the incumbent members of the Mexican Academy of Language and the National System of Art Creators.

== Awards and honors ==
- 2002 José Fuentes Mares National Prize for Literature for El amante de Janis Joplin
