= The Witch of Edmonton =

Play written by Thomas Dekker

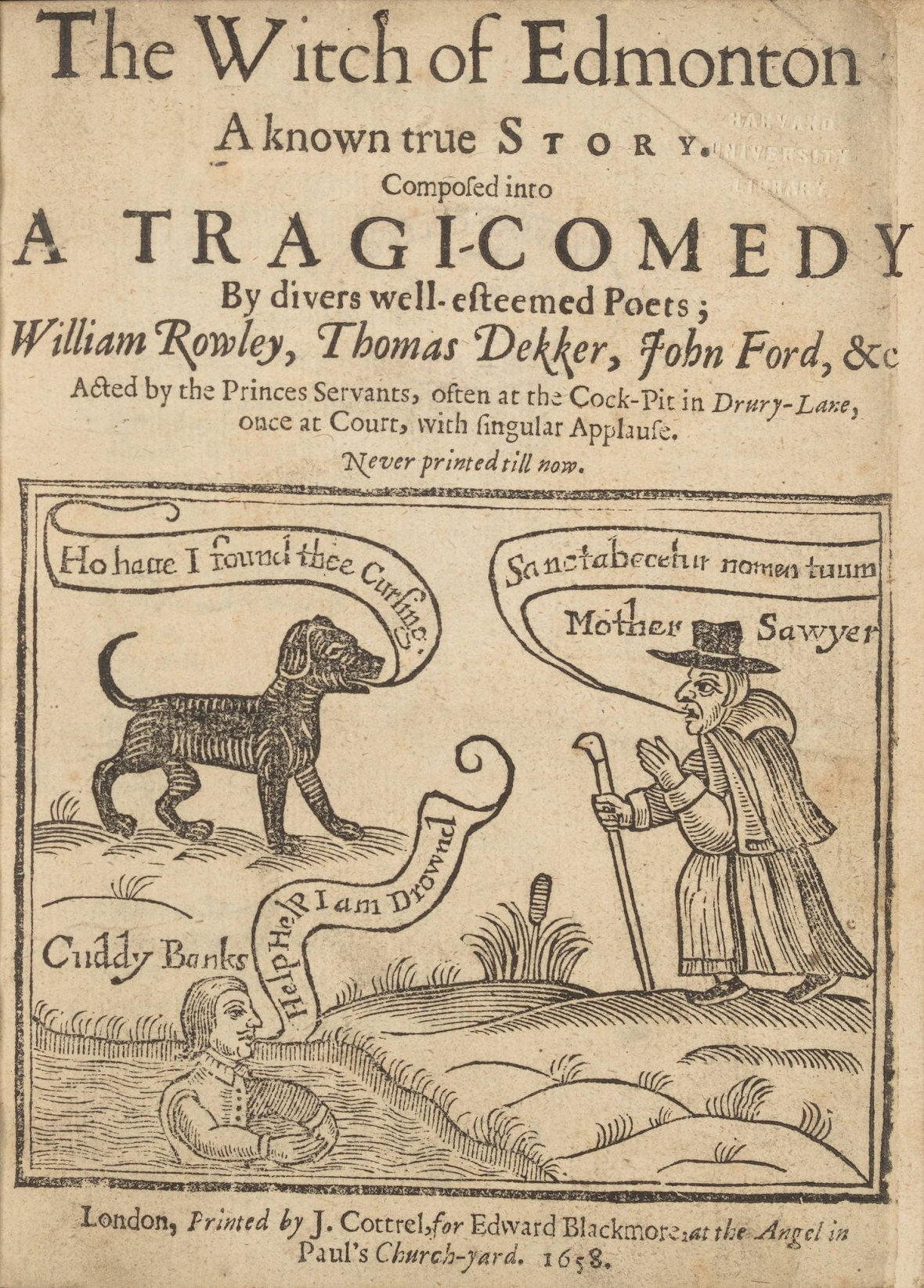
Title page from the first edition of the play (1658)

The Witch of Edmonton is an English Jacobean play, written by William Rowley, Thomas Dekker and John Ford in 1621.

The play—"probably the most sophisticated treatment of domestic tragedy in the whole of Elizabethan-Jacobean drama"—is based on events that supposedly took place in the parish of Edmonton, then outside London, earlier that year. The play depicts Elizabeth Sawyer, an old woman shunned by her neighbours, who gets revenge by selling her soul to the Devil, who appears to her in the shape of a black dog called Tom. In addition, there are two subplots. One depicts a bigamist who murders his second wife at the devil's prompting, and the other depicts a clownish yokel who befriends the devil-dog.

== Date and authorship ==
Written and first acted in 1621, the play was not published until 1658. It was entered into the Stationers' Register on 21 May that year; the edition that followed was issued by the bookseller Edward Blackmore. The title page of the first edition attributes the play to "divers well-esteemed Poets; William Rowley, Thomas Dekker, John Ford, &c." Scholars have generally ignored the "et cetera" and assigned the play to the three named playwrights—though a few have noted that the three writers were working with John Webster at the time, on Keep the Widow Waking, and have suggested that the "&c." might stand for Webster.

== Sources ==
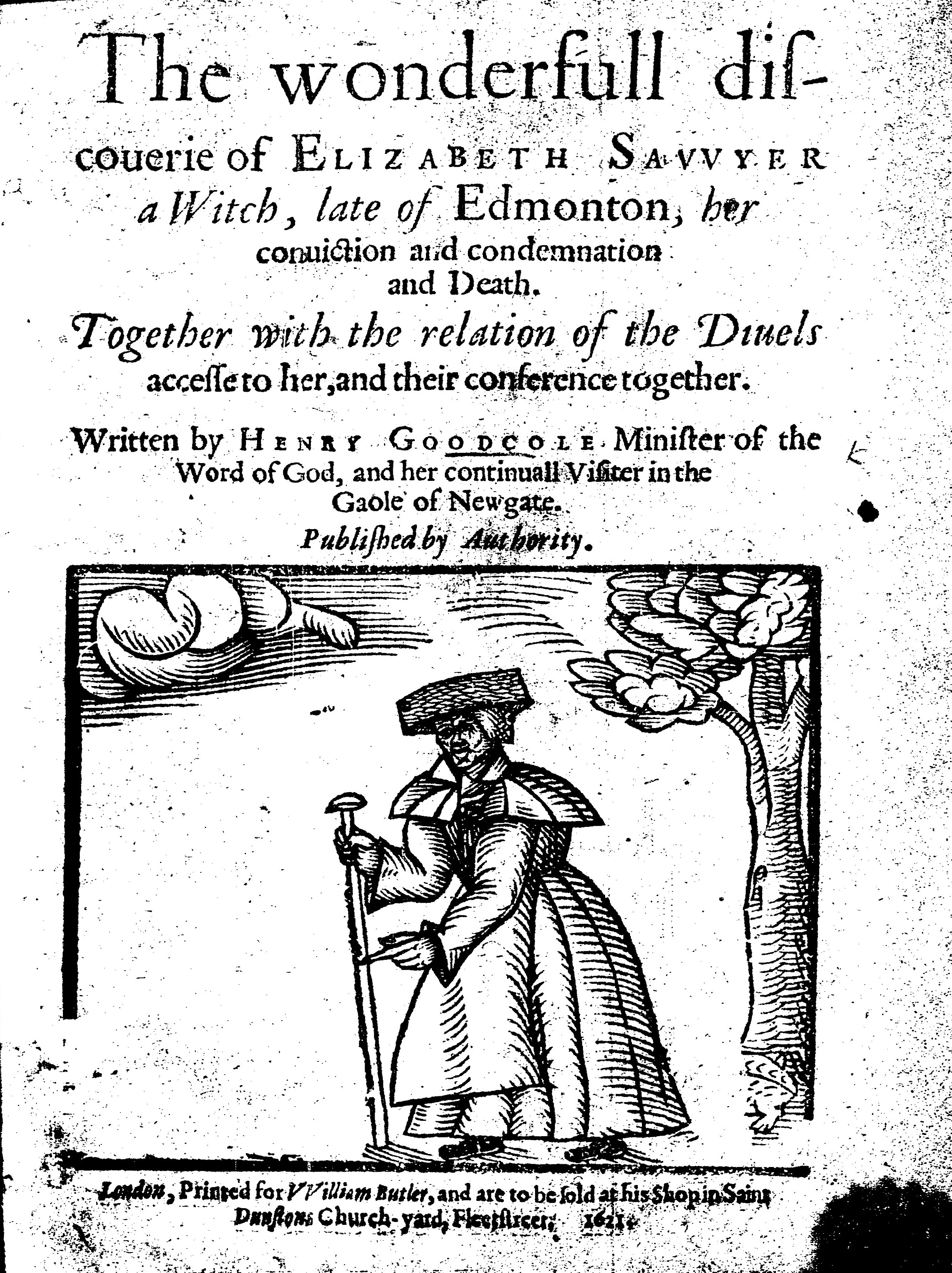
Title page of The wonderfull discoverie of Elizabeth Sawyer a Witch, by Henry Goodcole (1621)

The play was inspired by the real-life story of Elizabeth Sawyer, who had been executed for witchcraft on 19 April 1621, and draws heavily on a pamphlet by Henry Goodcole, The wonderful discovery of Elizabeth Sawyer a Witch (1621). While Goodcole's pamphlet claims to portray the devilish truth of Sawyer as questioned in prison, the Sawyer of the play is treated more sympathetically.

== Performance history ==
The play was first acted by Prince Charles's Men at the Cockpit Theatre in 1621 (there is a record of a performance at Court on 29 December of that year). In the modern age it has been performed twice by the Royal Shakespeare Company, first in a touring production which ran from 1981 to 1982 with Miriam Karlin, and secondly in 2014, in a production starring Eileen Atkins in the lead role. In June 2019, the play was revived and reworked by Hoof and Horn Productions at the BT Theatre in Oxford. In this retelling, Elizabeth Sawyer's storyline took centre stage: the Frank plot was removed and replaced by bits of new writing and theatrical portions of Henry Goodcole's pamphlet. In January 2020, The Witch of Edmonton was performed for the first time in Edmonton, Canada as a part of Edmonton's Winter Shakespeare Festival. The performance was a staged reading of a text adapted by John Richardson to include references to the history and contemporary landmarks of the Canadian Edmonton.

== Primary characters ==
- Sir Arthur Clarington. A wealthy knight and the employer of Frank Thorney and Winifred. He has a secret affair with Winifred, and when she gets pregnant, he pushes Frank to marry her in order to cover his own indiscretion.
- Old Thorney. Frank Thorney's father. He is a gentleman who has mortgaged all of his lands. He pushes his son to marry Susan Carter in order to escape his financial difficulties.
- Old Carter. The father of Susan Carter and Katherine Carter. He is a wealthy farmer who uses his daughters' marriages as means to improve his social status.
- Old Banks. The father of Cuddy Banks. He beats Mother Sawyer at the beginning of the play for gathering sticks on his land.
- Warbeck. Suitor to Susan Carter. A stuffy scholar. He becomes bitter when Susan chooses Frank Thorney over him.
- Somerton. Suitor to Katherine Carter.
- Frank Thorney. Old Thorney's son. He marries Winifred because he thinks she is pregnant with his child, enters into a second bigamous marriage with Susan, murders Susan as he attempts to escape with the dowry money, and is eventually executed for his crimes.
- Young Cuddy Banks. Old Banks' son (the clown). A country yokel and Morris-dancer. He makes friends with the Devil-Dog, but due to his innocence and ignorance, he proves incorruptible.
- Old Ratcliffe. The husband of Anne Ratcliffe, a woman who is driven insane by the Devil-Dog at Mother Sawyer's behest.
- Justice. The local Justice of the Peace. He passes judgment on Frank Thorney and Mother Sawyer at the end of the play.
- Dog. A devil or spirit who has assumed the form of a black dog. Sometimes called 'Tom'. He performs mischievous acts for Mother Sawyer after she promises her soul to him. He can only be seen by Mother Sawyer and Cuddy Banks.
- Mother Sawyer (Elizabeth Sawyer). The 'witch' of Edmonton. At the beginning of the play, she is merely a poor old decrepit woman, but she makes a deal with a devil to get revenge on her neighbors when they treat her poorly and accuse her of using witchcraft to spoil their crops and kill their livestock.
- Anne Ratcliffe. Old Ratcliffe's wife. At Mother Sawyer's bequest, the Devil-Dog drives her insane and causes her to beat her own brains out.
- Susan Carter. Old Carter's eldest daughter. She chooses to marry Frank Thorney rather than Warbeck. Frank murders her when she tries to follow him as he escapes with the dowry money.
- Katherine Carter. Old Carter's younger daughter. She is wooed by and agrees to marry Somerton. While nursing Frank back to health, she finds the bloody knife he used to murder her sister Susan, thereby revealing Frank's guilt.
- Winifred. Sir Arthur Clarington's maid and Frank Thorney's first wife. Sir Arthur gets her pregnant and offers Frank money to marry her. When Frank flees after his second marriage, she travels with him disguised as his boy-servant.

== Plot ==
Elizabeth Sawyer is a poor, lonely, and unfairly ostracized old woman, who turns to witchcraft after having been unjustly accused of it, having nothing left to lose. A talking devil-dog Tom (performed by a human actor) appears, becoming her familiar and only friend. With Tom's help, Sawyer causes one of her neighbours to go mad and kill herself, but otherwise she does not achieve very much, since many of those around her are only too willing to sell their souls to the devil all by themselves. The play is divided fairly rigidly into separate plots, which only occasionally intersect or overlap. Alongside the main story of Elizabeth Sawyer, the other major plotline is a domestic tragedy centering on the farmer's son Frank Thorney. Frank is secretly married to the poor but virtuous Winnifride, whom he loves and believes is pregnant with his child, but his father insists that he marry Susan, elder daughter of the wealthy farmer Old Carter. Frank weakly gives in to a bigamous marriage but then tries to flee the county with Winnifride disguised as his page. When the doting Susan follows him, he stabs her. At this point, the witch's dog Tom is present on stage and it is left ambiguous whether Frank remains a fully responsible moral agent in the act. Frank inflicts superficial wounds on himself, so that he can pretend to have been attacked, and attempts to frame Warbeck, Susan's former suitor, and Somerton, suitor of Susan's younger sister Katherine. While the kindly Katherine is nursing her supposedly incapacitated brother-in-law, however, she finds a bloodstained knife in his pocket and immediately guesses the truth, which she reveals to her father. The devil-dog is on stage again at this point, and "shrugs for joy," according to the stage direction, which suggests that he has brought about Frank's downfall.

Frank is executed for his crime at the same time as Mother Sawyer, but he, in marked contrast to her, is forgiven by all and the pregnant Winnifride is taken into the family of Old Carter. The play thus ends on a relatively happy note—Old Carter enjoins all those assembled at the execution, "So, let's every man home to Edmonton with heavy hearts, yet as merry as we can, though not as we would."

The note of optimism is also heard in the play's other main plot, centering on the Morris dancing yokel Cuddy Banks, whose invincible innocence allows him to emerge unscathed from his own encounters with the dog Tom; he eventually banishes the dog from the stage with the words "Out, and avaunt!"

Despite the optimism of the play's ending it remains clear that the execution of Mother Sawyer has done little or nothing to purge the play's world of an evil to which its inhabitants are only too ready to turn spontaneously. Firstly, the devil-dog has not been destroyed, and indeed resolves to go to London and corrupt souls there. Secondly, the village's voice of authority, the lord of the manor Sir Arthur Clarington, is represented as untrustworthy, and Mother Sawyer utters a lengthy tirade indicting his lechery (he has previously had an affair with Winnifride, which she now repents) and general corruption, a charge which the play as a whole supports.

The Witch of Edmonton may be very ready to capitalize on the sensational story of a witch, but it does not permit an easy and comfortable demonization of her; it presents her as a product of society rather than an anomaly in it.

== Related works ==
In Elizabeth Hand's 2023 novel A Haunting on the Hill, a sequel to Shirley Jackson's The Haunting of Hill House, the characters are working on a new play based on The Witch of Edmonton.

The play, Witch by Jen Silverman, is a retelling of The Witch of Edmonton. It takes many of the original characters and themes and looks at them from a more modern perspective while holding onto the 17th-century setting.

== See also ==
- The Witch
- The Late Lancashire Witches
