= 1995 in science fiction =

The year 1995 was marked, in science fiction, by the following:

== Events ==
- The 53rd annual Worldcon, Intersection, was held in Glasgow, Scotland

== Births and deaths ==
=== Deaths ===
- Roger Zelazny

== Literary releases ==
=== Novels ===
- The Diamond Age, by Neal Stephenson
- The Lost World, by Michael Crichton
- Parasite Eve, by Hideaki Sena
- The Prestige, by Christopher Priest

=== Comics ===
- Akiko, by Mark Crilley
- Big Guy and Rusty the Boy Robot, by Frank Miller and Geof Darrow

== Movies ==
- 12 Monkeys, dir. by Terry Gilliam
- City of Lost Children, dir. by Marc Caro and Jean-Pierre Jeunet
- Ghost in the Shell, dir. by Mamoru Oshii
- Johnny Mnemonic, dir. by Robert Longo
- Judge Dredd, dir. by Danny Cannon

== Television ==
- Neon Genesis Evangelion
- Star Trek: Voyager

== Video games ==
- Chrono Trigger
- Descent
- I Have No Mouth and I Must Scream

== Awards ==
=== Hugos ===
- Best novel: Mirror Dance, by Lois McMaster Bujold
- Best novella: Seven Views of Olduvai Gorge, by Mike Resnick
- Best novelette: "The Martian Child" by David Gerrold
- Best short story: " None So Blind" by Joe Haldeman
- Best related work: I. Asimov: A Memoir, by Isaac Asimov
- Best dramatic presentation: Star Trek: The Next Generation - " All Good Things...", dir. by Winrich Kolbe; written by Ronald D. Moore and Brannon Braga
- Best professional editor: Gardner Dozois
- Best professional artist: Jim Burns
- Hugo Award for Best Original Artwork: Lady Cottington's Pressed Fairy Book, by Brian Froud and Terry Jones
- Best Semiprozine: Interzone, ed. by David Pringle
- Best fanzine: Ansible, ed. by Dave Langford
- Best fan writer: Dave Langford
- Best fan artist: Teddy Harvia

=== Nebulas ===
- Best novel: The Terminal Experiment, by Robert J. Sawyer
- Best novella: Last Summer at Mars Hill, by Elizabeth Hand
- Best novelette: "Solitude" by Ursula K. LeGuin
- Best short story: "Death and the Librarian" by Esther Friesner

=== Other awards ===
- BSFA Award for Best Novel: The Time Ships, by Stephen Baxter
- Locus Award for Best Science Fiction Novel: Mirror Dance by Lois McMaster Bujold
- Saturn Award for Best Science Fiction Film: 12 Monkeys
