= The Haunting (1999 film) =

American horror film by Jan de Bont

- Theatrical release poster
- Directed by: Jan de Bont
- Screenplay by: David Self
- Based on: The Haunting of Hill House by Shirley Jackson
- Produced by: Donna Arkoff Roth; Colin Wilson; Susan Arnold; Steven Spilberg (exec.)
- Starring: Liam Neeson; Catherine Zeta-Jones; Owen Wilson; Lili Taylor
- Cinematography: Karl Walter Lindenlaub
- Edited by: Michael Kahn
- Music by: Jerry Goldsmith
- Production company: Roth-Arnold Productions
- Distributed by: DreamWorks Pictures
- Release dates: July 20, 1999 (Los Angeles); July 23, 1999 (United States)
- Running time: 114 minutes
- Country: United States
- Language: English
- Budget: $80 million
- Box office: $180.2 million

The Haunting is a 1999 American supernatural horror film directed by Jan de Bont, and starring Liam Neeson, Catherine Zeta-Jones, Owen Wilson, and Lili Taylor, with Marian Seldes, Bruce Dern, Todd Field, and Virginia Madsen appearing in supporting roles. Based on the 1959 novel The Haunting of Hill House by Shirley Jackson, it is the second feature film adaptation of the source material after Robert Wise's 1963 film adaptation of the same name. Its plot follows a group of people who gather at Hill House, a manor in western Massachusetts for an apparent volunteer study on insomnia, only to find themselves plagued by paranormal events connected to the home's grim history.

Development for The Haunting originally began as a collaboration between filmmaker Steven Spielberg and writer Stephen King, who together began writing a new adaptation of Jackson's novel, largely inspired by Wise's 1963 film version. After creative differences, the project was aborted, with King retooling his screenplay to form the 2002 miniseries Rose Red. Spielberg meanwhile commissioned a new screenplay for the project, written by David Self, to be produced under Spielberg's studio, DreamWorks Pictures. He stepped out as a director to direct Minority Report and only executive-produced the film, remaining uncredited. According to a 2020 interview with Jan de Bont, executive producer Steven Spielberg visited the set of The Haunting on several occasions during production, having previously developed the project before de Bont assumed directing duties. Filming of The Haunting began in the fall of 1998, with some location shoots occurring in England at Harlaxton Manor and Belvoir Castle, though the majority of the film was shot in specially crafted sets in Los Angeles by Argentine production designer Eugenio Zanetti.

The Haunting had its world premiere at the Regency Village Theatre on July 20, 1999, before being theatrically released in North America on July 23, 1999. The film received mostly negative reviews from critics, with its screenplay and extensive use of special effects being points of criticism, though it did receive praise for its elaborate set design and performances. (Note: Attributed to multiple critical reviews.) The film was a financial success, grossing $180.2 million worldwide against a production budget of $80 million.

== Plot ==
Eleanor "Nell" Vance, an insomniac, has cared for her disabled mother for 11 years, sharing a Boston apartment with her. After her mother dies, Nell's sister Jane and her husband Lou inherit the residence and eject Nell to prepare for a sale. As she faces homelessness, Nell accepts an invitation to participate in an insomnia study by Dr. David Marrow at Hill House, a secluded, sprawling manor in the Berkshires of western Massachusetts. At the house, she meets Mr. and Mrs. Dudley, the eccentric caretakers. Two other participants soon arrive: the goofy Luke Sanderson, and Theodora ("Theo"), a glamorous, openly bisexual artist. Dr. Marrow and his two research assistants, Mary and Todd, follow. Unknown to the participants, Dr. Marrow's true purpose is to study the psychological response to fear, intending to expose his subjects to terror.

During their first night, Dr. Marrow relates the story of Hill House: Its original owner, Hugh Crain, a 19th-century textile tycoon, constructed the rambling home for his wife Renee, hoping to populate it with a large family. Unfortunately, all of Crain's children were stillborns, and Renee, devastated by the multiple losses, killed herself, while Crain became a recluse.

Following this, Mary is wounded in a freak accident involving a snapped piano wire, and leaves with Todd to go to the hospital. Supernatural events begin happening, and Nell sees apparitions of children. A large portrait of Hugh Crain is vandalized with the words "Welcome Home Eleanor" written in blood. Theo and Luke accuse Nell, claiming she is seeking attention.

Nell becomes determined to prove that the house is haunted. She finds Crain's hidden study and learns that he extensively used child labor in his cotton mills. He tortured and killed orphans in his home, then burned their bodies in the fireplace. She surmises that these children's spirits are trapped in the house, providing Crain with an "eternal family". Crain had a second wife named Carolyn, from whom Nell is descended. Dr. Marrow is skeptical and reveals the truth of his fear study to the group, but after a statue comes to life and tries to drown him, he realizes Hill House is haunted. Nell reveals that she is related to Carolyn Crain and must help the children move on to the afterlife.

The group tries to leave Hill House but Hugh Crain's ghost traps them inside. Luke defaces a portrait of Crain, enraging his spirit to decapitate Luke with a large chimney flue. When Crain manifests, Nell realizes that he thrived on the fear he created in children and declares that she is not afraid of him. Her declaration weakens the ghost and he is cast into a decorative bronze door depicting the distressed children in purgatory. He drags Nell with him, but the benevolent spirits release her and she dies. Nell's soul, along with those of the freed children, ascends to heaven.

The following morning, Dr. Marrow and Theo meet the Dudleys at the front gate in silence and leave Hill House behind.

== Cast ==
- Lili Taylor as Eleanor "Nell" Vance
- Liam Neeson as Dr. David Marrow
- Catherine Zeta-Jones as Theodora "Theo"
- Owen Wilson as Luke Sanderson
- Marian Seldes as Mrs. Dudley
- Bruce Dern as Mr. Dudley
- Alix Koromzay as Mary Lambetta
- Todd Field as Todd Hackett
- Virginia Madsen as Jane Vance
- Tom Irwin as Lou
- Charles Gunning as Hugh Crain
- Debi Derryberry, Jessica Evans, Sherry Lynn, Miles Marsico, Courtland Mead, Kyle McDougle, Kelsey Mulrooney and Hannah Swanson as the voices of the children

== Production ==
=== Development ===
Filmmaker Steven Spielberg approached horror author Stephen King in 1996 about making a haunted house film, and the two agreed that Robert Wise's 1963 film The Haunting was a benchmark of cinematic haunted house horror. After collaborating on a screenplay partly based on Wise's film (an adaptation of the Shirley Jackson novel The Haunting of Hill House), Spielberg and King ran into creative differences, and the project was ultimately aborted. Spielberg pushed forward with the project, commissioning first-time screenwriter David Self to write a screenplay for the film. King went on to retool his rendition of the material into the 2002 miniseries Rose Red, which shares some elements of both Wise's 1963 film, as well as Jackson's source novel.

While Jan de Bont was working on post-production for Twister, Spielberg offered to take over directing duties on Minority Report in exchange for directing The Haunting. De Bont did not want the film to be a remake of the 1963 version, as he wanted to focus more on the book that it was adapted from.

=== Casting ===
The casting of Liam Neeson, Lili Taylor, and Catherine Zeta-Jones in the lead roles was announced in September 1998, with Neeson portraying Dr. Marrow, Taylor portraying Nell Vance, and Zeta-Jones portraying Theodora. Owen Wilson was cast as Luke Sanderson, the third subject of Marrow's study. Bruce Dern and Marian Seldes were cast as Mr. and Mrs. Dudley, the eccentric and superstitious caretakers of Hill House, respectively.

=== Filming ===
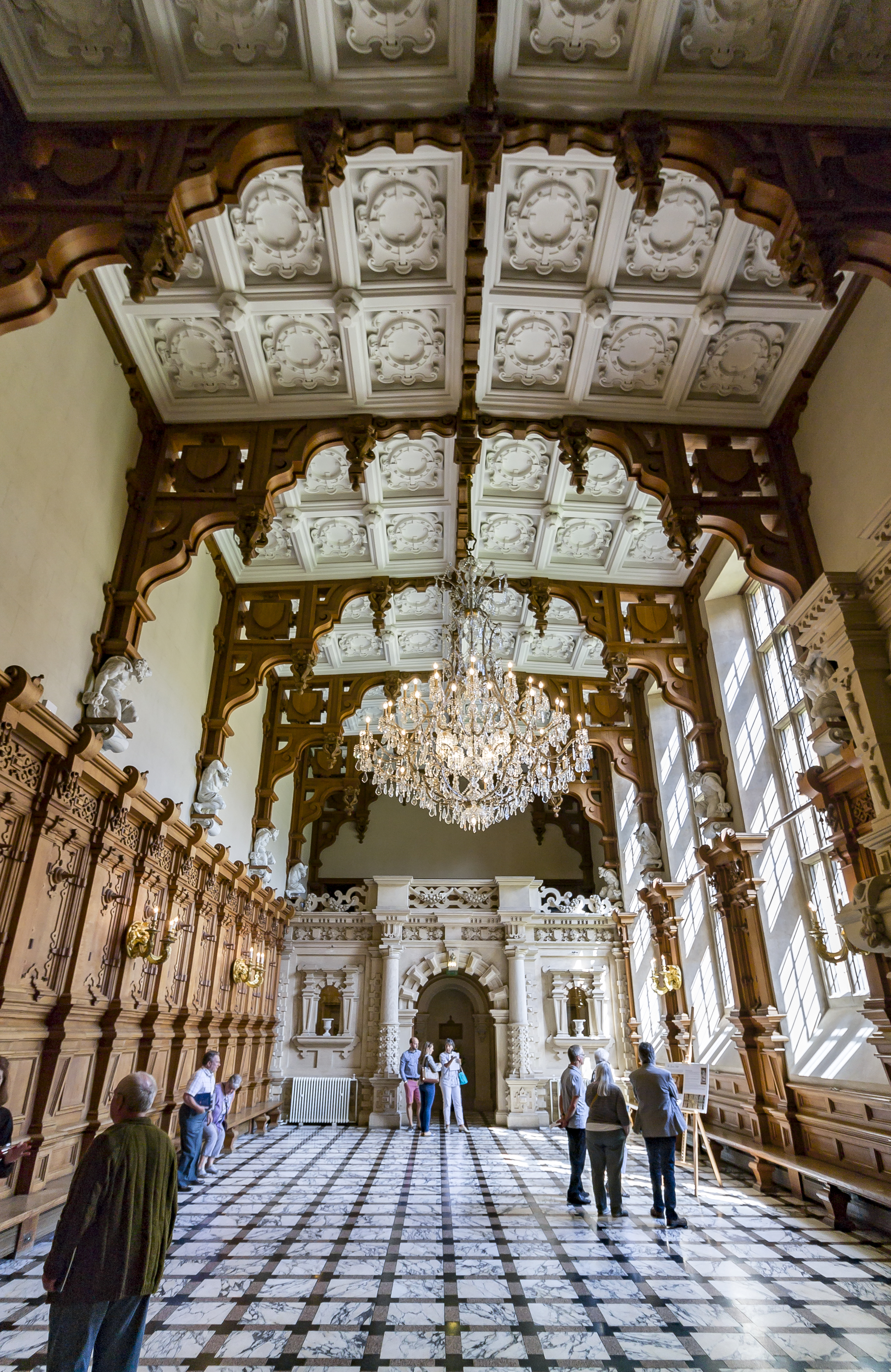
The Great Hall of Harlaxton Manor, which was used as Hill House's games room.

Principal photography began on November 30, 1998. Cinematographer Caleb Deschanel was originally hired to shoot the film, but left over creative differences one week into filming. He was replaced by Karl Walter Lindenlaub. VistaVision cameras were used extensively during the filming process.

Harlaxton Manor in Lincolnshire, England, was used as the exterior of Hill House while its Great Hall served as the games room scene where Marrow comforts Nell after seeing the bloodied "Welcome Home Eleanor" writing and where Nell reveals Hugh Crain's crimes. The kitchen and pantry scenes were filmed inside Belvoir Castle.

The majority of the interior sets were built inside the dome-shaped hangar that once housed Hughes H-4 Hercules, near the permanently docked RMS Queen Mary steamship, in Long Beach, California. The handcrafted interior sets cost an estimated $8–10 million to construct, and were designed by Argentine production designer Eugenio Zanetti. De Bont recalled that Zanetti "was an unusual choice for a horror movie, but I thought of this more as an opera. I wanted the set to be as much a character as the lead actors, so I needed someone who had done something like that. My research led me to Eugenio, I explained to him what I was looking for and the set he came up with was absolutely spectacular." De Bont cited the film The Innocents (1961) as an inspiration for the film's appearance and cinematography.

=== Post-production ===
Following principal photography, the film's elaborate visual effects were completed by Phil Tippett, who had previously provided effects work on Jurassic Park (1993).

The studio demanded a new ending be shot as executives felt de Bont's original ending "lacked clarity." The revised ending was completed in June 1999 with the involvement of Taylor and Zeta-Jones. According to de Bont: "We added some shots of the spirits of the children... well, I'm not going to give it all away." Additionally, a brief romantic scene between Taylor and Zeta-Jones's characters was excised from the final cut. Commenting on this, Taylor said: "It doesn't surprise me that it was lost. It didn't feel very integral to the story, anyway."

According to de Bont, the original cut of the film was potentially facing an R-rating from the Motion Picture Association of America (MPAA). "It was a little hard to get a PG-13 [rating]. They basically said it was too tense. So we trimmed a couple of things. This is a movie that kids can see. There's no foul language, no guns, no violence, really. What's happening is... it's more surreal. It's not like someone's surprising you with a chain saw." The film was edited by Michael Kahn, a frequent collaborator of Steven Spielberg.

== Release ==
The Haunting had its world premiere at the Regency Village Theatre in Los Angeles on July 20, 1999. It was subsequently given a wide theatrical release in North America on July 23, 1999, screening in 2,808 theaters. It was released in the United Kingdom alongside Analyze This on September 24, 1999.

=== Home media ===
The Haunting was released on VHS and DVD by DreamWorks Home Entertainment on November 23, 1999. Following Paramount Pictures' acquisition of DreamWorks, Paramount reissued the film on DVD in October 2017.

In October 2020, Paramount released the film on Blu-ray featuring a new 4K restoration under their "Paramount Presents" Blu-ray line. On February 27, 2023, Scream Factory announced a forthcoming 4K UHD Blu-ray release that was released on May 30, 2023.

== Reception ==
=== Box office ===
The film earned $33,435,140 during its opening weekend, ranking in first place ahead of Inspector Gadget, American Pie and Eyes Wide Shut. It became the second consecutive number one DreamWorks film to open on the third weekend of July after Independence Day, following Saving Private Ryan. It was overtaken by Runaway Bride during its second weekend, falling into fourth place behind the latter film, The Blair Witch Project and Deep Blue Sea with a 54.4% decline and a gross of $15.2 million.

In the United Kingdom, the film beat out Analyze This and Eyes Wide Shut to top the box office, collecting $2.1 million. In its second weekend, it made $1.8 million, dropping into second place below Big Daddy. The film remained in theatrical release until November 1999. It ultimately grossed $91,411,151 in North America, and $85,900,000 in international markets, making for a worldwide gross of $177,311,151.

=== Critical response ===
On the review aggregator website Rotten Tomatoes, 17% of 103 critics' reviews are positive, with an average rating of 3.7/10. The website's consensus reads: "Sophisticated visual effects fail to offset awkward performances and an uneven script." Metacritic, which uses a weighted average, assigned the film a score of 45 out of 100, based on 21 critics, indicating "mixed or average" reviews. Metacritic, which uses a weighted average, assigned the film a score of 42 out of 100, based on 28 critics, indicating "mixed or average" reviews. Audiences polled by CinemaScore gave the film an average grade of "C+" on an A+ to F scale.

Roger Ebert gave the film a favorable review, awarding it three stars out of four, and praising the production design in particular: "To my surprise, I find myself recommending The Haunting based on its locations, its sets, its art direction, its sound design, and the overall splendor of its visuals. The story is a mess, but for long periods that hardly matters. It's beside the point, as we enter one of the most striking spaces I've ever seen in a film." Similar sentiments were echoed by The New York Times's Janet Maslin, who deemed the film "a lavish illustration of how to take a fairly modest black-and-white horror film from 1963 and amplify it so relentlessly that the sight of the flying cow in Twister would not be all that amiss... the film's spooky tricks are orchestrated by top-notch behind-the-scenes talent, who augment Mr. De Bont's tireless efforts to keep things moving." David Sterritt of The Christian Science Monitor similarly noted that, though the film "falls short of Jackson's teeming imagination, paying more attention to a ponderous historical subplot... the best reason to see The Haunting is the sheer sumptuousness of its creepy-crawly set designs. The second-best reason is Lili Taylor, whose sincerity and conviction could make any script come at least partly alive."

Michael Wilmington of the Chicago Tribune praised Taylor's lead performance, and noted of the cast: "As an ensemble, they're all fun to watch. Very few actors, though, could upstage this house—especially when [set designer] Zanetti and visual effects supervisors Phil Tippett and Craig Hayes haul out the computer magic to wage all-out war on the human foursome." Todd McCarthy of Variety praised the film's set design, but found its screenplay lackluster, noting that the film "dooms itself from the outset with a setup that is too artificial for the subsequent drama to be compelling, and with characters whose lack of a strong purpose severely limits their interest. The only thing that keeps you going for a time is the sense that it's going to get better, that something wild and scary is bound to happen eventually." Stephanie Zacharek of Salon equated the film to "a roller-coaster ride instead of an actual movie," criticizing its "jumble of special effects." Desson Howe of The Washington Post expressed ambivalence about the film's special effects, writing: "You can almost sense the special effects poised in the wings, waiting for that Act III cue. We know the scary stuff is coming. That's what keeps us waiting. Without giving too much away, those effects are fairly impressive. Not amazing."

Philip French of The Guardian was unimpressed by the film, calling it "a silly and defiantly unfrightening affair." Almar Haflidason of the BBC awarded the film two out of five stars, writing: "The vice-like grip of this cinematic demon is sadly not loosened by a satisfying denouement. Instead, De Bont hits frantic mode, resulting in a closing half-hour that's nothing less than bonkers. Everything is thrown at the screen, and pretty soon you're as exhausted as the hapless suckers you're watching." Lisa Schwarzbaum of Entertainment Weekly panned the film, deeming it "worse than awful: desperate. It's a horror flick afraid of its own audience... No wonder the audience laughs derisively through scenes not meant for laughter. That isn't the acrid odor of fear we smell in this house of horrors. It's flop sweat."

=== Accolades ===
Award	Year	Category	Nominee(s)	Result	Ref.
Blockbuster Entertainment Awards	2000	Favorite Actress – Horror	Catherine Zeta-Jones	Nominated	
Blockbuster Entertainment Awards	2000	Favorite Actor – Horror	Liam Neeson	Nominated	
Blockbuster Entertainment Awards	2000	Favorite Supporting Actress – Horror	Lili Taylor	Nominated	
Blockbuster Entertainment Awards	2000	Favorite Supporting Actor – Horror	Owen Wilson	Nominated	
BMI Film & TV Awards	2000	Best Music	Jerry Goldsmith (also for The Mummy)	Won	
Fangoria Chainsaw Awards	2000	Worst Film		Won	
Golden Raspberry Awards	2000	Worst Picture	Donna Arkoff Roth, Colin Wilson, Susan Arnold	Nominated	
Golden Raspberry Awards	2000	Worst Director	Jan de Bont	Nominated	
Golden Raspberry Awards	2000	Worst Actress	Catherine Zeta-Jones (also for Entrapment)	Nominated	
Golden Raspberry Awards	2000	Worst Screenplay	David Self	Nominated	
Golden Raspberry Awards	2000	Worst Screen Couple	Lili Taylor and Catherine Zeta-Jones	Nominated	
Stinkers Bad Movie Awards	2000	Worst Sense of Direction	Jan de Bont	Nominated	
Stinkers Bad Movie Awards	2000	Worst Screenplay for a Film Grossing Over $100M Worldwide Using Hollywood Math	David Self	Nominated	
Stinkers Bad Movie Awards	2000	Worst Remake		Won	
Stinkers Bad Movie Awards	2000	Least "Special" Special Effects		Nominated	
Online Film & Television Association Film Awards	2000	Best Sound Mixing	David John, David Macmillan, Gary Rydstrom	Nominated	
Online Film & Television Association Film Awards	2000	Best Visual Effects	Scott Farrar, Craig Hayes, David Rosenthal, Phil Tippett	Nominated	

== See also ==
- List of ghost films
- A Haunting on the Hill

== Sources ==
- Pykett, Derek (2014). British Horror Film Locations. Jefferson, North Carolina: McFarland & Company. ISBN 978-0-786-45193-7.
- Stanley, John (2000). Creature Features: The Science Fiction, Fantasy, and Horror Movie Guide. New York City, New York: Berkley Boulevard Books. ISBN 978-0-425-17517-0.
