= 1999 Stinkers Bad Movie Awards =

Award ceremony presented by the Stinkers Bad Movie Awards in 2006

22nd Stinkers Bad Movie Awards
- Date: 2000

Highlights
- Worst Film: Wild Wild West
- Most awards: Star Wars Episode I: The Phantom Menace and Wild Wild West (4)
- Most nominations: Wild Wild West (10)

The 22nd Stinkers Bad Movie Awards were released by the Hastings Bad Cinema Society in 2000 to honour the worst films the film industry had to offer in 1999. Founder Ray Wright listed Pokémon: The First Movie among his five worst movies of the 1990s alongside Batman & Robin, It's Pat, Crash, and Nothing but Trouble. Listed as follows are the different categories with their respective winners and nominees, including Worst Picture and its dishonourable mentions, which are films that were considered for Worst Picture but ultimately failed to make the final ballot (42 total). All winners are highlighted.

== Winners and Nominees ==
=== Worst Picture ===
| Film | Production company(s) | Percentage of Votes |
|---|---|---|
| Wild Wild West | Warner Bros. | 29% |
| Baby Geniuses | TriStar | 26% |
| The Blair Witch Project | Artisan Entertainment | 25% |
| Inspector Gadget | Walt Disney Pictures | 11% |
| The Mod Squad | MGM | 9% |

==== Dishonourable Mentions ====
- The Astronaut's Wife (New Line)
- The Bachelor (New Line)
- Big Daddy (Columbia)
- Breakfast of Champions (Hollywood)
- Bringing Out The Dead (Paramount)
- Chill Factor (Warner Bros.)
- Crazy in Alabama (Columbia)
- Detroit Rock City (New Line)
- Dudley Do-Right (Universal)
- 8MM (Columbia)
- End of Days (Universal)
- Eyes Wide Shut (Warner Bros.)
- Free Enterprise (Anchor Bay)
- Gloria (Columbia)
- The Haunting (DreamWorks)
- House on Haunted Hill (Warner Bros.)
- Idle Hands (Columbia)
- Instinct (aka InSTINK) (Touchstone)
- Jakob The Liar (Columbia)
- Jawbreaker (TriStar)
- The King and I (Warner Bros.)
- Life (Universal)
- Lost & Found (Warner Bros.)
- The Love Letter (DreamWorks)
- Love Stinks (Independent Artists)
- The Messenger: The Story of Joan of Arc (Columbia)
- Music of the Heart (Miramax)
- My Favorite Martian (Disney)
- The Omega Code (Providence Entertainment)
- Pokémon: The First Movie (Warner Bros.)
- The Rage: Carrie 2 (MGM)
- Simon Sez (Columbia)
- Star Wars: Episode I – The Phantom Menace (Fox)
- Stigmata (MGM)
- The Story of Us (Universal)
- Superstar (Paramount)
- Teaching Mrs. Tingle (Miramax)
- 200 Cigarettes (Paramount)
- Universal Soldier: The Return (TriStar)
- Varsity Blues (Paramount)
- Virus (Universal)
- Wing Commander (Fox)

=== Worst Director ===
| Recipient | Percentage of Votes |
|---|---|
| Bob Clark for Baby Geniuses | 26% |
| Jan de Bont for The Haunting | 22% |
| David Kellogg for Inspector Gadget | 16% |
| Joel Schumacher for 8MM and Flawless | 13% |
| Barry Sonnenfeld for Wild Wild West | 23% |

=== Worst Actor ===
| Recipient | Percentage of Votes |
|---|---|
| Robin Williams for Bicentennial Man and Jakob the Liar | 31% |
| Kevin Costner for For Love of the Game and Message in a Bottle | 30% |
| Cuba Gooding, Jr. for Chill Factor and Instinct | 16% |
| Kevin Kline for Wild Wild West | 8% |
| Arnold Schwarzenegger for End of Days | 15% |

=== Worst Actress ===
| Recipient | Percentage of Votes |
|---|---|
| Melanie Griffith for Crazy in Alabama | 28% |
| Claire Danes for The Mod Squad | 7% |
| Heather Donahue for The Blair Witch Project | 25% |
| Milla Jovovich for The Messenger: The Story of Joan of Arc | 18% |
| Sharon Stone for Gloria and The Muse | 22% |

=== Worst Supporting Actor ===
| Recipient | Percentage of Votes |
|---|---|
| Jar Jar Binks (played by Ahmed Best) in Star Wars Episode I: The Phantom Menace | 49% |
| Spike Lee for Summer of Sam | 21% |
| Giovanni Ribisi for The Mod Squad | 8% |
| William Shatner for Free Enterprise | 17% |
| Rod Steiger for Crazy in Alabama | 5% |

=== Worst Supporting Actress ===
| Recipient | Percentage of Votes |
|---|---|
| Denise Richards for The World Is Not Enough | 34% |
| Kirstie Alley for Drop Dead Gorgeous | 25% |
| Helena Bonham Carter for Fight Club | 3% |
| Ellen DeGeneres for Goodbye Lover and The Love Letter | 31% |
| Christina Ricci for 200 Cigarettes | 7% |

=== Most Painfully Unfunny Comedy ===
| Recipient | Percentage of Votes |
|---|---|
| Wild Wild West (Warner Bros.) | 33% |
| Baby Geniuses (TriStar) | 22% |
| Big Daddy (Columbia) | 16% |
| Inspector Gadget (Disney) | 22% |
| My Favorite Martian (Disney) | 7% |

=== Worst On-Screen Couple ===
| Recipient | Percentage of Votes |
|---|---|
| Siegfried and Roy in Siegfried & Roy: The Magic Box | 33% |
| Pierce Brosnan and Denise Richards in The World Is Not Enough | 19% |
| Sean Connery and Catherine Zeta-Jones in Entrapment | 14% |
| Will Smith and Kevin Kline in Wild Wild West | 17% |
| Bruce Willis and Michelle Pfeiffer in The Story of Us | 17% |

=== Worst Song or Song Performance Featured in a Film or Its End Credits ===
| Recipient | Percentage of Votes |
|---|---|
| "No Tears for Caesar" by William Shatner and the Rated R from Free Enterprise | 37% |
| "Highway To Hell" by Marilyn Manson from Detroit Rock City | 18% |
| "Then You Look at Me" by Celine Dion from Bicentennial Man | 18% |
| "Wild Wild West" by Will Smith from Wild Wild West | 22% |
| "Word Up" by Melanie B. (aka Scary Spice) from Austin Powers: The Spy Who Shagged Me | 5% |

=== Worst Screenplay for a Film Grossing Over $100M Worldwide Using Hollywood Math ===
| Recipient | Percentage of Votes |
|---|---|
| Wild Wild West (Warner Bros.), story by Jim and John Thomas; screenplay by S. S. Wilson, Brent Maddock, Jeffrey Price, and Peter S. Seaman; based on the TV series The Wild Wild West | 32% |
| Big Daddy (Columbia), story by Steve Franks; screenplay by Franks, Tim Herlihy, and Adam Sandler | 15% |
| The Haunting (DreamWorks), written by David Self and Michael Tolkin; based on Shirley Jackson's novel The Haunting of Hill House | 11% |
| Pokémon: The First Movie (Warner Bros.), written by Takeshi Shudo; based on the Pokémon franchise | 31% |
| Star Wars Episode I: The Phantom Menace (Fox), written by George Lucas | 11% |

=== Worst Fake Accent ===
| Recipient | Percentage of Votes |
|---|---|
| The entire cast of Jakob the Liar | 35% |
| Melanie Griffith in Crazy in Alabama | 25% |
| Christina Ricci in 200 Cigarettes | 7% |
| Sharon Stone for Gloria | 11% |
| The entire cast of Varsity Blues | 22% |

=== Worst On-Screen Hairstyle (Male) ===
| Recipient | Percentage of Votes |
|---|---|
| Dennis Rodman in Simon Sez | 37% |
| Tom Cruise in Magnolia | 15% |
| John Cusack in Being John Malkovich | 19% |
| Brad Pitt in Fight Club | 9% |
| Burt Reynolds for Mystery, Alaska | 20% |

=== Worst On-Screen Hairstyle (Female) ===
| Recipient | Percentage of Votes |
|---|---|
| Melanie Griffith in Crazy in Alabama | 34% |
| Helena Bonham Carter in Fight Club | 15% |
| Angelina Jolie in Girl, Interrupted | 24% |
| Milla Jovovich in The Messenger: The Story of Joan of Arc | 15% |
| Sharon Stone in Gloria and The Muse | 12% |

=== Most Unwelcome Direct-to-Video Release ===
| Recipient | Percentage of Votes |
|---|---|
| All nine Pokémon videos released in 1999 | 39% |
| Barney's Night Before Christmas | 24% |
| Children of the Corn 666: Isaac's Return | 18% |
| K-911 | 15% |
| Our Friend, Martin | 4% |

=== Worst Remake ===
| Recipient | Percentage of Votes |
|---|---|
| The Haunting (DreamWorks) | 46% |
| The Bachelor (New Line) | 8% |
| Cruel Intentions (Columbia) | 14% |
| Gloria (Columbia) | 25% |
| House on Haunted Hill (Warner Bros.) | 7% |

=== Worst Sequel or Prequel ===
| Recipient | Percentage of Votes |
|---|---|
| The Rage: Carrie 2 (MGM) | 31% |
| Austin Powers: The Spy Who Shagged Me (New Line) | 23% |
| Muppets from Space (Columbia) | 10% |
| Star Wars Episode I: The Phantom Menace (Fox) | 19% |
| Universal Soldier: The Return (TriStar) | 17% |

=== The Remake, Sequel, or Prequel Nobody Was Clamoring For ===
| Recipient | Percentage of Votes |
|---|---|
| The Rage: Carrie 2 (MGM) | 27% |
| Gloria (Columbia) | 25% |
| The Haunting (DreamWorks) | 7% |
| The Out-of-Towners (Paramount) | 22% |
| Universal Soldier: The Return (TriStar) | 19% |

=== Worst Resurrection of a TV Show ===
| Recipient | Percentage of Votes |
|---|---|
| Wild Wild West (Warner Bros.) | 27% |
| Dudley Do-Right (Universal) | 17% |
| Inspector Gadget (Disney) | 14% |
| The Mod Squad (MGM) | 24% |
| My Favorite Martian (Disney) | 18% |

=== Least "Special" Special Effects ===
| Recipient | Percentage of Votes |
|---|---|
| Baby Geniuses (TriStar) | 24% |
| The Haunting (DreamWorks) | 14% |
| Inspector Gadget (Disney) | 22% |
| Twin Dragons (Dimension) | 18% |
| Wild Wild West (Warner Bros.) | 22% |

=== Biggest Disappointment (Films That Didn't Live Up to Their Hype) ===
| Recipient | Percentage of Votes |
|---|---|
| The Blair Witch Project (Artisan) | 28% |
| Eyes Wide Shut (Warner Bros.) | 20% |
| Pokémon: The First Movie (Warner Bros.) | 7% |
| Star Wars Episode I: The Phantom Menace (Fox) | 26% |
| Wild Wild West (Warner Bros.) | 19% |

=== Most Botched Comic Relief (Ideas That Couldn't Have Looked Good, Even On Paper) ===
| Recipient | Percentage of Votes |
|---|---|
| The Annoying Sidekick (Jar Jar Binks, played by Ahmed Best) in Star Wars Episode I: The Phantom Menace | 52% |
| John Leguizamo impersonates Marlon Brando or Rosie Perez, we're not sure, in Frogs for Snakes | 12% |
| David Spade impersonates Neil Diamond in Lost & Found | 8% |
| The Talking Car (Gadgetmobile, voice by D.L. Hughley) in Inspector Gadget | 16% |
| The Talking Suit (Zoot the Suit, voice by Wayne Knight) in My Favorite Martian | 12% |

=== Worst Screen Debut ===
| Recipient | Percentage of Votes |
|---|---|
| Jar Jar Binks (played by Ahmed Best) in Star Wars Episode I: The Phantom Menace | 34% |
| Mariah Carey in The Bachelor | 15% |
| Heather, Michael, Josh, the Stick People, and the world's longest-running batteries in The Blair Witch Project | 24% |
| Pokémon (all 151 of them!) | 15% |
| The Possessed Hand in Idle Hands | 12% |

=== Musicians Who Shouldn't Be Acting ===
| Recipient | Percentage of Votes |
|---|---|
| Mariah Carey in The Bachelor | 33% |
| Master P in Foolish | 16% |
| Alanis Morissette in Dogma | 19% |
| Slash in The Underground Comedy Movie | 23% |
| Isaac Stern in Music of the Heart | 9% |

=== Most Intrusive Musical Score ===
| Recipient | Percentage of Votes |
|---|---|
| Eyes Wide Shut (Warner Bros.) | 39% |
| Fight Club (Fox) | 14% |
| Magnolia (New Line) | 18% |
| Mickey Blue Eyes (Warner Bros.) | 3% |
| Universal Soldier: The Return (TriStar) | 26% |

=== Worst Performance by a Child in a Featured Role ===
| Recipient | Percentage of Votes |
|---|---|
| Jake Lloyd in Star Wars Episode I: The Phantom Menace | 34% |
| Jean-Luke Figueroa in Gloria | 13% |
| Leo, Gerry and Myles Fitzgerald in Baby Geniuses | 32% |
| Jonathan Lipnicki in Stuart Little | 6% |
| Cole and Dylan Sprouse in Big Daddy | 15% |

=== Worst Achievement in Animation ===
| Recipient | Percentage of Votes |
|---|---|
| Pokémon: The First Movie (Warner Bros.) | 72% |
| Doug's 1st Movie (Disney) | 12% |
| The King and I (Warner Bros.) | 16% |
| Princess Mononoke (Studio Ghibli) (Note: This film was not nominated on the Stinkers official website, but was featured in the "Past Winners Database" of the Los Angeles Times.) | N/A |
| South Park: Bigger, Longer & Uncut (Paramount, Warner Bros.) | N/A |

=== The Founders Award (What Were They Thinking)? ===
- The Motion Picture Association of America for rating Eyes Wide Shut "R"

== Films with multiple wins and nominations ==
The following films received multiple nominations:

| Nominations | Film |
|---|---|
| 10 | Wild Wild West |
| 7 | Star Wars Episode I: The Phantom Menace |
| 6 | Gloria |
| 6 | Inspector Gadget |
| 5 | Baby Geniuses |
| 5 | The Haunting |
| 5 | Pokémon: The First Movie |
| 4 | The Blair Witch Project |
| 4 | Crazy in Alabama |
| 4 | Eyes Wide Shut * |
| 4 | Fight Club |
| 4 | The Mod Squad |
| 3 | The Bachelor |
| 3 | Big Daddy |
| 3 | My Favorite Martian |
| 3 | Universal Soldier: The Return |
| 2 | Austin Powers: The Spy Who Shagged Me |
| 2 | Bicentennial Man |
| 2 | Free Enterprise |
| 2 | Jakob the Liar |
| 2 | Magnolia |
| 2 | The Messenger: The Story of Joan of Arc |
| 2 | The Muse |
| 2 | The Rage: Carrie 2 |
| 2 | 200 Cigarettes |
| 2 | The World Is Not Enough |

- Note: For each film with an asterisk, one of those nominations was the Founders Award.

The following films received multiple wins:

| Wins | Film |
|---|---|
| 4 | Star Wars Episode I: The Phantom Menace |
| 4 | Wild Wild West |
| 2 | Baby Geniuses |
| 2 | Crazy in Alabama |
| 2 | Jakob the Liar |
| 2 | The Rage: Carrie 2 |

== Mike Lancaster's Review of The Underground Comedy Movie ==
Founder Mike Lancaster cited The Underground Comedy Movie as the worst movie he ever paid to see. Despite this, it received only one nomination for Musicians Who Shouldn't Be Acting. His review is as follows:

"The funniest part of this tragically UNfunny embarrassment comes during the end credits. It is there that writer/star Vince Offer thanks the creators of There's Something About Mary for stealing elements of this film to make theirs. He claims he sent them a promotional videotape copy of Underground in 1997 and they pilfered his jokes and made untold fortunes. The movie poster even claims that a "lawsuit is pending." Hmmm. After viewing both Offer's The Underground Comedy Movie and the Farrelly Brothers' There's Something About Mary, we learn that there are indeed some things the films have in common: 1. They are both shot on 35mm film, 2. They are both in English, 3. They are both in color, and 4. They both have stereo soundtracks. I could go on ... Both films show people driving in automobiles, both films have daytime AND nighttime scenes, and the opening and closing credits of both films feature lettering in both upper and lowercase white lettering. Yes, the similarities are eerie, aren't they? Other than those things, there is not one frame of Underground that bares even the slightest resemblance to Mary. If this frivolous lawsuit ever goes to trial, Offer and company better hope I'm not on the jury. If there is to be a lawsuit, it should really be directed at Offer, who has stolen (in some cases, word for word/scene for scene) elements of such 70s and 80s low-brow comedies as Kentucky Fried Movie, Groove Tube, and Amazon Women on the Moon and turned them into a frighteningly unfunny mix of scenes that confuse rather than amuse. It may be marketing genius to claim someone stole your film ideas just to get people to pay $8 to see what all the fuss is about, but in the case of The Underground Comedy Movie, I think the Farrelly Brothers and 20th Century Fox may have grounds to sue Offer for huge damages just for being compared to such a horribly made film as the inept Underground Comedy Movie."

— Michael Lancaster, The Hastings Bad Cinema Society
