= Generation Loss =

Generation loss is a quality degradation between successive copies or transcodes of data. It may also refer to:

- Generation Loss (novel), a 2007 novel by Elizabeth Hand
- Generation Loss (Westworld), a 2022 episode of the television series Westworld
