= The Maiden Flight of McCauley's Bellerophon =

2010 novella by Elizabeth Hand

"The Maiden Flight of McCauley's Bellerophon" is a science fiction/magical realism novella by the American writer Elizabeth Hand. It was first published in the Neil Gaiman/Al Sarrantonio-edited anthology Stories: All-New Tales, in 2010, and subsequently republished in Hand's 2012 anthology Errantry: Strange Stories from Small Beer Press.

== Synopsis ==
An aviation historian is terminally ill. As a last gift, her friends decide to falsify evidence that will support her personal theory regarding the invention of flight.

== Reception ==
"Maiden Flight" won the 2011 World Fantasy Award—Novella, and was nominated for the 2011 Hugo Award for Best Novella and the 2011 Theodore Sturgeon Award.

Theodora Goss calls it "simple on one level and intensely complicated on another. And beautiful, and a joy to read," while the Portland Press Herald described it as "bittersweet" and "magical", and Roz Kaveney judged it "possibly the best" story in the anthology.

== Genre ==
Hand has stated that the story "balance[s] on a knife-edge between fantasy and science fiction," with "elements of both", and declined to further explain what happens in it, saying "You tell me."
