= Waking the Moon =

1994 novel by Elizabeth Hand

- First edition (UK)
- Author: Elizabeth Hand
- Cover artist: Ian Miller
- Language: English
- Genre: Dark fantasy
- Publisher: HarperCollins
- Publication date: 1994
- Media type: Print

Waking the Moon is a 1994 dark fantasy novel by American writer Elizabeth Hand. It was the winner of the James Tiptree, Jr. Award and the 1996 Mythopoeic Award for Adult Literature. It is set mainly in the University of the Archangels and St. John The Divine, a fictional university inspired by The Catholic University of America, mentioned in a few of Hand's novels.

The first UK edition was published as a 598-page paperback original in 1994 by HarperCollins. The first US edition was published as a 390-page hardcover in 1995 by Harper Prism and revised with cuts.

== Plot summary ==
Sweeney Cassidy starts out as a freshman at university, where she meets the mysterious Angelica and falls in love with the strange and beautiful Oliver. She gets tangled up in sinister supernatural events involving the awakening of an ancient malevolent goddess.

According to the afterword for the short story "The Bacchae", found in the collection Last Summer At Mars Hill, it is another trope on ancient Greek myth that prefigures Waking the Moon. They both involve murderous cults of women. Elizabeth Hand has said that she wanted to show that ancient goddess cultures were not all as peaceful and idyllic as many tend to think.

== Reception ==
Terri Windling selected Waking the Moon as one of the best fantasy books of 1994, praising it as "a suspenseful, panoramic story of murder, conspiracy, and ancient secret societies".
