= Gloria (1999 American film) =

1999 film by Sidney Lumet

- Theatrical release poster
- Directed by: Sidney Lumet
- Screenplay by: Steve Antin
- Based on: Gloria; 1980 film by John Cassavetes
- Produced by: Gary Foster; Lee Rich
- Starring: Sharon Stone; Jeremy Northam; Cathy Moriarty; Jean-Luke Figueroa; Mike Starr; George C. Scott
- Cinematography: David Watkin
- Edited by: Tom Swartwout
- Music by: Howard Shore
- Production companies: Columbia Pictures; Mandalay Entertainment; Eagle Point
- Distributed by: Sony Pictures Releasing
- Release date: January 22, 1999
- Running time: 108 minutes
- Country: United States
- Language: English
- Budget: $30 million
- Box office: $4.9 million

Gloria is a 1999 American neo-noir crime thriller film directed by Sidney Lumet from a screenplay by Steve Antin. It is a remake of John Cassavetes' 1980 film. It stars Sharon Stone in the title role, with Jeremy Northam, Cathy Moriarty, Jean-Luke Figueroa, Mike Starr, and George C. Scott in supporting roles; it was the last feature film appearance for Scott, who died eight months after the film was released. It follows a mobster's tough ex-mistress who befriends a boy left orphaned by a murderous gunman.

The film was theatrically released in the United States on January 22, 1999, by Sony Pictures Releasing. It received negative reviews from critics and was a box-office bomb, grossing only $4.9 million worldwide against a $30 million budget. For her performance, Stone was nominated for Worst Actress at the 20th Golden Raspberry Awards.

== Plot ==
Gloria has just gotten out of prison, where she has served three years to save her boyfriend, Kevin. During her stay in prison, she thinks about how Kevin never once visited her. She tells Kevin that the relationship is over and that all she wants is the money he promised her for taking the rap for him. He refuses to give it to her.

Meanwhile, the gang's accountant has tried to protect himself by creating a computer disk with the names of all those involved in the outfit's criminal activities. The plan backfires, and—in trying to get the disk—one of Kevin's trigger-happy henchmen kills the accountant, his wife, his mother-in-law and his daughter. Only his seven-year-old son Nicky escapes, but is quickly caught and brought to Kevin's apartment. It is there that Gloria and Nicky meet. Gloria must decide whether or not to risk her life in order to save the boy.

Gloria begins to feel love for the young boy as his innocence and intelligent nature inspire her. She tells him that she hates kids and that is why she doesn't have kids. She lectures him to get used to this world and to grow up on his own. She then tries to ditch him in a subway, but Nicky comes back. As Gloria and Nicky spend more time together, they both develop feelings for each other. The boy sees news reports of his family being killed by the mob and runs away from the hotel room he and Gloria were staying in. Gloria follows in pursuit and Nicky gets on the train to go back to his family's apartment. Unable to catch Nicky before he gets on the train, Gloria is frantic and tells the cops her kid is on that train heading to 158th Street. After the cops apprehend Nicky, he and Gloria go back to the hotel room and Gloria gives Nicky a bath. Lying awake Gloria hears Nicky wake up. He asks "Did it really happen?"

Later, Nicky and Gloria are separated in a crowd while being chased by Kevin and the gang. Nicky is apprehended. Gloria meets with Ruby at a race track and negotiates an exchange: Nicky for the accountant's disk. Gloria takes Nicky to a boarding school; however, they decide that they would prefer to remain together as a family.

== Cast ==
- Sharon Stone as Gloria Swenson
- Jean-Luke Figueroa as Nicky Nunez
- Jeremy Northam as Kevin
- Cathy Moriarty-Gentile as Diane
- George C. Scott as Reuben "Ruby"
- Mike Starr as Sean
- Bonnie Bedelia as Brenda
- Barry McEvoy as Terry
- Don Billett as Raymond
- Jerry Dean as Mickey
- Tony DiBenedetto as Zach
- Teddy Atlas as Ian
- Bobby Cannavale as Jack Jesus Nunez
- Sarita Choudhury as Angela Nunez
- Míriam Colón as Maria Nunez
- Desiree Casado as Luz Nunez

== Production ==
In April 1997, Sharon Stone was cast as Gloria Swenson, a role that earned Gena Rowlands an Oscar nomination, and the filmmakers began to search for a "boy, age 7–9" to play Nicky. 6-year-old Jean-Luke Figueroa, who impressed the team most, was eventually chosen to play the role.

Scott Kalvert had been assigned to direct the film, but later left the production. In the first weeks of July, Sidney Lumet stepped in as director. Bonnie Bedelia, Cathy Moriarty, and Jeremy Northam joined the cast in August. After Albert Finney rejected the role of Ruby, George C. Scott accepted it. The rest of the cast was filled out in early September, and rehearsals started on September 8, 1997, then filming began.

== Reception ==
=== Box office ===
Gloria grossed $4.1 million in the United States and Canada, and $800,000 in other territories, for a worldwide total of $4.9 million.

=== Critical response ===
On the review aggregator website Rotten Tomatoes, 14% of 29 critics' reviews are positive, with an average rating of 4.2/10. Metacritic, which uses a weighted average, assigned the film a score of 26 out of 100, based on 19 critics, indicating "generally unfavorable" reviews.

Godfrey Cheshire of Variety stated, "A travesty trying to be a Sharon Stone vehicle, this wooden crime yarn easily qualifies as the most tired, unexciting mob movie in recent memory." Jack Mathews of the Los Angeles Times opined that "the movie exists as an acting exercise for Stone, which turns out--predictably--to be all sweat and no Gloria." Owen Gleiberman of Entertainment Weekly described the film as "the Sidney Lumet-directed dud that sprung from the singularly bad idea of remaking John Cassavetes' oddball 1980 character study." Peter Travers of Rolling Stone claimed, "It's early in the year, but I'll bet that Gloria grabs a top spot on any list of the worst movies of 1999."

Stephen Hunter of The Washington Post wrote that "G-L-O-R-I-A is A-W-F-U-L" and "I found myself praying that the film would jam and melt and, well past the halfway point, it did, and I was sprung, 30 minutes early." Desson Thomson of the same newspaper mainly criticized Stone's performance, commenting that "there were animatronic velociraptors in Jurassic Park that displayed more acting chops than Sharon Stone."

On the other hand, Lawrence Van Gelder of The New York Times gave Gloria a positive review, calling it "a smoother, funnier, more suspenseful and more endearing version of the 1980 John Cassavetes film of the same title" and writing that "Stone, who in one guise or another has always been a treat, turns in a performance that definitely merits the key to Noo Yawk."

=== Accolades ===
Year	Award	Category	Recipient	Result
2000	20th Golden Raspberry Awards	Worst Actress	Sharon Stone	Nominated
2000	22nd Stinkers Bad Movie Awards	Worst Actress	Sharon Stone	Nominated
2000	22nd Stinkers Bad Movie Awards	Worst Fake Accent	Sharon Stone	Nominated
2000	22nd Stinkers Bad Movie Awards	Worst On-Screen Hairstyle (Female)	Sharon Stone	Nominated
2000	22nd Stinkers Bad Movie Awards	Worst Remake	Gloria	Nominated
2000	22nd Stinkers Bad Movie Awards	The Remake, Sequel, or Prequel Nobody Was Clamoring For	Gloria	Nominated
2000	22nd Stinkers Bad Movie Awards	Worst Performance by a Child in a Featured Role	Jean-Luke Figueroa	Nominated
