= Generation Loss (novel) =

2007 novel by Elizabeth Hand

- First edition
- Author: Elizabeth Hand
- Cover artist: Jacob McMurray
- Language: English
- Publisher: Small Beer Press
- Publication date: 2007
- Publication place: United States
- Media type: Print (Hardcover & Paperback)
- Pages: 300
- ISBN: 978-0-156-03134-9

Generation Loss is a 2007 novel by American writer Elizabeth Hand.

== Reception ==
Generation Loss was generally well received by critics, including a starred review from Booklist and Publishers Weekly.

Booklist's David Pitt called the protagonist "utterly compelling" and noted that the novel is "brilliantly written and completely original."

Describing the novel, Publishers Weekly wrote about how Hand "explores the narrow boundary between artistic genius and madness in this gritty, profoundly unsettling literary thriller." In addition to other praise, they noted that "the novel's final chapters [...] are a terror tour-de-force that testify to the power of great fiction to disturb and provoke."

The Washington Post's Lloyd Rose stated that the novel's "portrayal of gritty suffering is as strong as its fantastical elements".

A few reviewers commented on the writing style and genre conventions. Pitt highlighted how the novel "veers off in a new and exciting direction [from science fiction], drawing on but going well beyond the crime genre." Graham Joyce, writing for The Washington Post, noted, "Generation Loss is a crossover novel, difficult to classify, uncomfortable, spiky. Hand is one of those writers who has challenged the restrictions of genre writing. Here, she both fights with and against the conventions of the thriller genre to get at an evil deeper than its mere perpetrator. [...] So although Generation Loss moves like a thriller, it detonates with greater resound. It's a dark and beautiful novel that should not be read by anyone under the age of 30."

== Awards ==
Generation Loss won the inaugural Shirley Jackson Award. It was also shortlisted for the Believer Book Award.
