= Last Summer at Mars Hill =

Short story collection by Elizabeth Hand

- First edition
- Author: Elizabeth Hand
- Language: English
- Publisher: HarperPrism
- Publication date: 1998

Last Summer at Mars Hill (1998) is the first short story collection by American writer Elizabeth Hand. It contains the Nebula Award-winning story of the same name. The story also won the 1995 World Fantasy Award—Novella. Her first ever published story, "Prince of Flowers", is included in the collection. Many of the stories have themes that prefigure those of her novels. ] For example, "The Boy in the Tree" grew into the first chapter of Winterlong. "In the Month of Athyr" is set in the same universe as Hand's first three novels.

All of the stories were previously published in various magazines.

== Contents ==
- "Last Summer at Mars Hill" (1994)
- "The Erl-King" (1993)
- "Justice" (1993)
- "Dionysus Dendrites" (1993)
- "The Have-Nots" (1992)
- "In the Month of Athyr" (1992)
- "Engels Unaware" (1992)
- "The Bacchae" (1991)
- "Snow on Sugar Mountain" (1991)
- "On the Town Route" (1989)
- "The Boy in the Tree" (1989)
- "Prince of Flowers" (1988)
