= The Haunting of Hill House =

1959 novel by Shirley Jackson

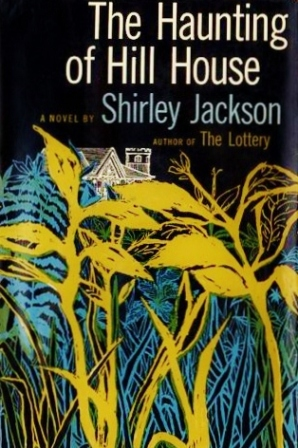
- Cover of the first edition
- Author: Shirley Jackson
- Language: English
- Genre: Gothic fiction, psychological horror
- Publisher: Viking
- Publication date: 1959
- Publication place: United States
- Media type: Print (Hardback & paperback)
- Pages: 246
- Text: The Haunting of Hill House online

The Haunting of Hill House is a 1959 gothic horror novel by American author Shirley Jackson. It was a finalist for the National Book Award and has been made into two feature films (The Haunting, directed by Robert Wise, and its remake), a play, and a Netflix series.

The book is dedicated to Leonard Brown, Jackson's English teacher at Syracuse University.

== Development ==
Jackson had decided to write "a ghost story" after reading about a group of nineteenth century "psychic researchers" who studied a supposedly haunted house. What she discovered in their "dry reports", she writes, "was not the story of a haunted house, it was the story of several earnest, I believe misguided, certainly determined people, with their differing motivations and backgrounds."

With this in mind, Jackson began to research her story. She later claimed to have found a magazine picture of a suitably haunted-looking house in California. According to Jackson, her mother, who lived in California, identified the architect as the author's own great-great-grandfather. Jackson also read many traditional ghost stories while preparing to write her own, stating: "No one can get into a novel about a haunted house without hitting the subject of reality head-on; either I have to believe in ghosts, which I do, or I have to write another kind of novel altogether."

As part of her process, Jackson sketched floor plans of the downstairs and upstairs of Hill House and a rendering of the exterior.

Jackson states that, before writing the novel, she awoke one morning to find a note on her desk that read "DEAD DEAD." The note was written in her handwriting, yet she did not remember penning it. "I had no choice," she later said. "The ghosts were after me."

== Summary ==
Hill House is a mansion in a location never specified, surrounded by hills. Dr. John Montague, an investigator of the supernatural, has rented Hill House for a summer and has invited as his guests several people chosen because of their experiences with paranormal events. Of these, only two accept: Eleanor Vance, a shy young woman who resented caring for her demanding, disabled mother (who has passed) and Theodora, a bohemian artist. Both are to join Montague at Hill House, along with Luke Sanderson, the young heir to the estate, where Montague hopes to find scientific evidence of the existence of the supernatural.

Eleanor travels to the house, where she and Theodora will live in isolation with Montague and Luke.

The house's two caretakers, Mr. and Mrs. Dudley, refuse to stay near the house at night. The four overnight visitors begin to form friendships as Montague explains the building's history, which encompasses suicide and other violent deaths.

All four of the inhabitants begin to experience strange events while in the house, including unexplained noises and spirits roaming the halls at night, strange writing on the walls, and other unexplained events. Eleanor tends to experience phenomena to which the others are oblivious. At the same time, it is implied that at least some of what Eleanor witnesses may be a product of her imagination. Another implied possibility is that Eleanor possesses a subconscious telekinetic ability that is itself the cause of many of the disturbances experienced by her and the others. This possibility is suggested especially by references early in the novel to Eleanor's childhood memories about episodes of a poltergeist-like entity that seemed to target her home.

Later in their stay, the doctor's wife, the haughty Mrs. Montague, and her companion Arthur Parker, the headmaster of a boys' school, arrive to spend a weekend at Hill House and help investigate it. They, too, are interested in the supernatural, including séances and spirit writing. Unlike the other four characters, they do not experience anything supernatural, although some of Mrs. Montague's alleged spirit writings seem to communicate with Eleanor.

Much of the supernatural phenomena that occur are described only vaguely, or else are partly hidden from the characters themselves. One night, Eleanor and Theodora are in a bedroom when an unseen force tries to open the door, and Eleanor believes after the fact that the hand she was holding in the darkness was not Theodora's. Later, as Theodora and Eleanor walk outside Hill House at night, they see a phantom family picnic that seems to be taking place in daylight. Theodora screams in fear for Eleanor to run, warning her not to look back, though the book never explains what Theodora sees, but she babbles, laughs, and cries in fright.

The others eventually come to believe Eleanor is the cause of the disturbances. Fearing for her safety, Montague and Luke declare that she must leave. Eleanor, however, now regards the house as her home and resists. Montague and Luke force her into her car; she bids them farewell and drives off, but before leaving the grounds of Hill House, she propels the car into a large oak tree to her implied death.

== Reception and legacy ==
In a New York Times review in 1959, Edmund Fuller wrote, "Shirley Jackson proves again that she is the finest master currently practising in the genre of the cryptic, haunted tale."

Stephen King, in his book Danse Macabre (1981), a non-fiction review of the horror genre, lists The Haunting of Hill House as one of the finest horror novels of the late 20th century and provides a lengthy review. In his review column for The Magazine of Fantasy & Science Fiction, Damon Knight selected the novel as one of the 10 best genre books of 1959, declaring it "in a class by itself."

Reappraising the book in The Guardian in 2010, Sophie Missing wrote, "Jackson treats her material – which could be reduced to penny dreadful stuff in less deft hands – with great skill and subtlety. […] The horror inherent in the novel does not lie in Hill House (monstrous though it is) or the events that take place within it, but in the unexplored recesses of its characters' – and its readers' – minds. This is perhaps why it remains the definitive haunted house story".

In 2016, in The Guardian, author Joanne Harris described the book as:

"...not only the best haunted-house story ever written, but also a quiet subversion of the ingénue trope in horror fiction, with a nod to Sartre’s Huis Clos with its toxic menage a trois."

In 2018, The New York Times polled 13 writers to choose the scariest book of fiction they have ever read, and Carmen Maria Machado and Neil Gaiman both chose The Haunting of Hill House.

Carmen Maria Machado wrote in The Atlantic about her experience discovering The Haunting of Hill House. She was at a writer's retreat while working on her short story "The Resident," and was told her story reminded readers of Shirley Jackson. Having read little of Jackson, Machado decided to read Hill House:

"When I went back home to Philly, I picked up a copy. And I just devoured it. I read it in one sitting. I started reading one night, and when my girlfriend (now wife) went to bed I just kept reading. It scared the shit out of me. Even though the events that appear to be supernatural activity are few and far between, those scenes are so chillingly written—as if Jackson was describing a phenomenon she'd seen before and really understood. The book's particular brand of surreality felt, to me, like that experience of walking home from a party a little bit drunk, when the world somehow seems sharper and clearer and weirder."

Sara Century, writing for SyFy, pointed out the queer themes of the book, specifically calling out the example of Theo as a queer character who goes against the "bury your gays" trope: "Theo stands out for being an imperfect, fallible queer woman consistently being subjected to life-threatening situations yet still walking away from them, evolving rather than fading away."

== Adaptations ==
=== Film ===
The novel has been adapted to film twice, in 1963 and again in 1999, both times under the title The Haunting. The 1963 version is a relatively faithful adaptation and received critical praise. The 1999 version, considerably different from the novel and widely panned by critics, is an overt fantasy horror in which all the main characters are terrorized and two are killed by explicitly supernatural deaths. It was also parodied in Scary Movie 2 (2001). In 2023, Elizabeth Hand returned to the story with A Haunting on the Hill.

=== Theater ===
It was first adapted for the stage in 1964 by F. Andrew Leslie. In 2015, Anthony Neilson prepared a new stage adaptation for Sonia Friedman and Hammer for production at the Liverpool Playhouse.

=== Radio ===
In 1997, The Haunting of Hill House was abridged for radio by Alison Joseph and broadcast on BBC Radio 4 in eight 15-minute episodes, read by Emma Fielding.

=== Television ===
A loose television adaptation was released in 2018 to critical acclaim. It changed many elements from the novel, keeping mainly its Hill House setting, Mr and Mrs Dudley, and a few character names, but shifted the focus to members of a similarly haunted "Crain family." It was directed by Mike Flanagan and was produced for Netflix. Varying from the novel, the series depicted the married couple and their five children being terrorized by the house for decades of their lives.
