= Elizabeth Sawyer =

Englishwoman accused of witchcraft

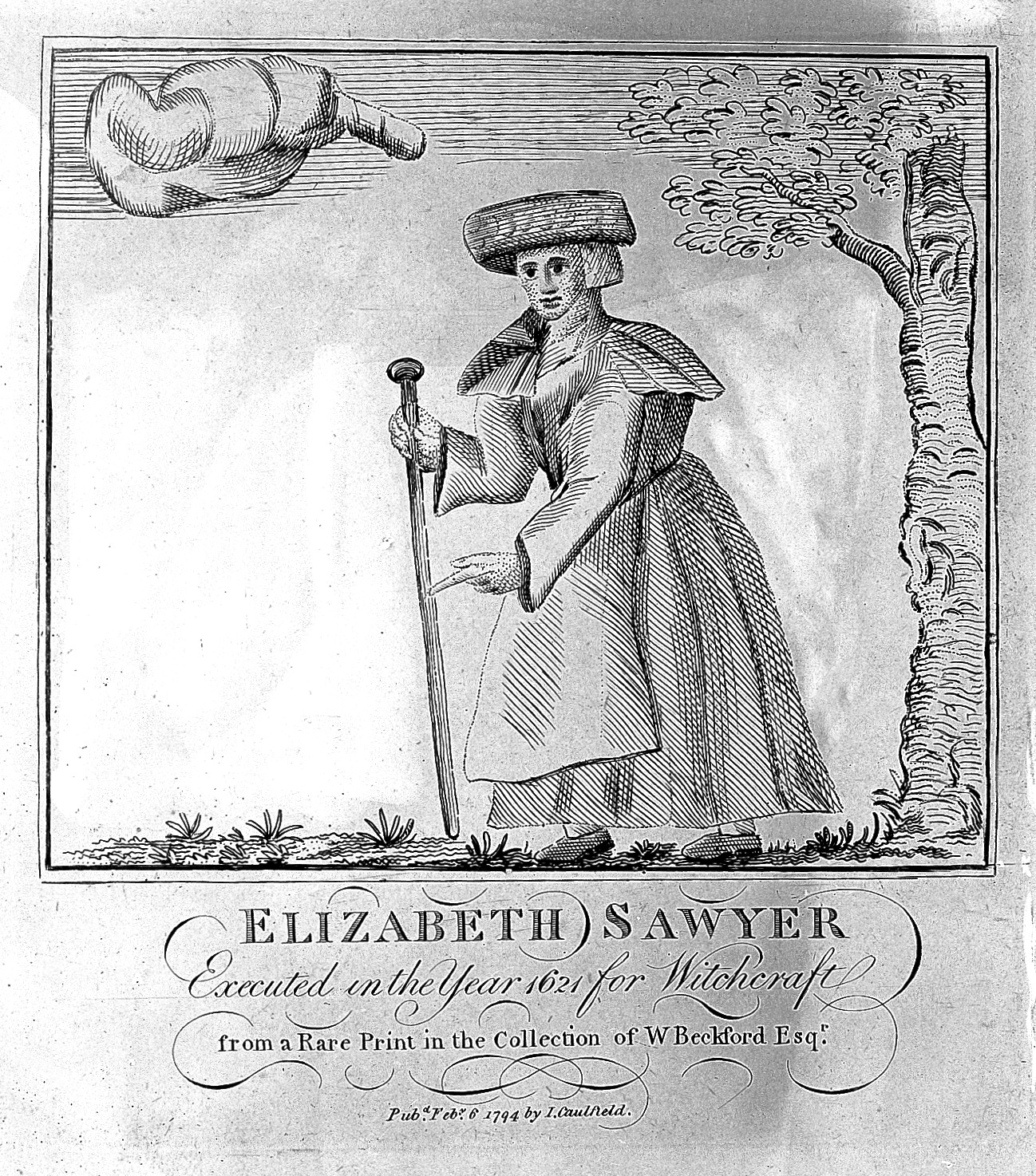
Engraving of Sawyer published in 1794

Elizabeth Sawyer was an inhabitant of the town of Edmonton, north of London (now part of Greater London), who was convicted and executed for witchcraft in 1621.

== Life and appearance ==
Sawyer was born Elizabeth Cronwell, but the date of her birth is unknown. She married Edward Sawyer in 1591, and with him she had eleven children, five of which survived. She is described as pale faced, with a stoop, and had lost one eye in an accident.

== Trial and execution ==
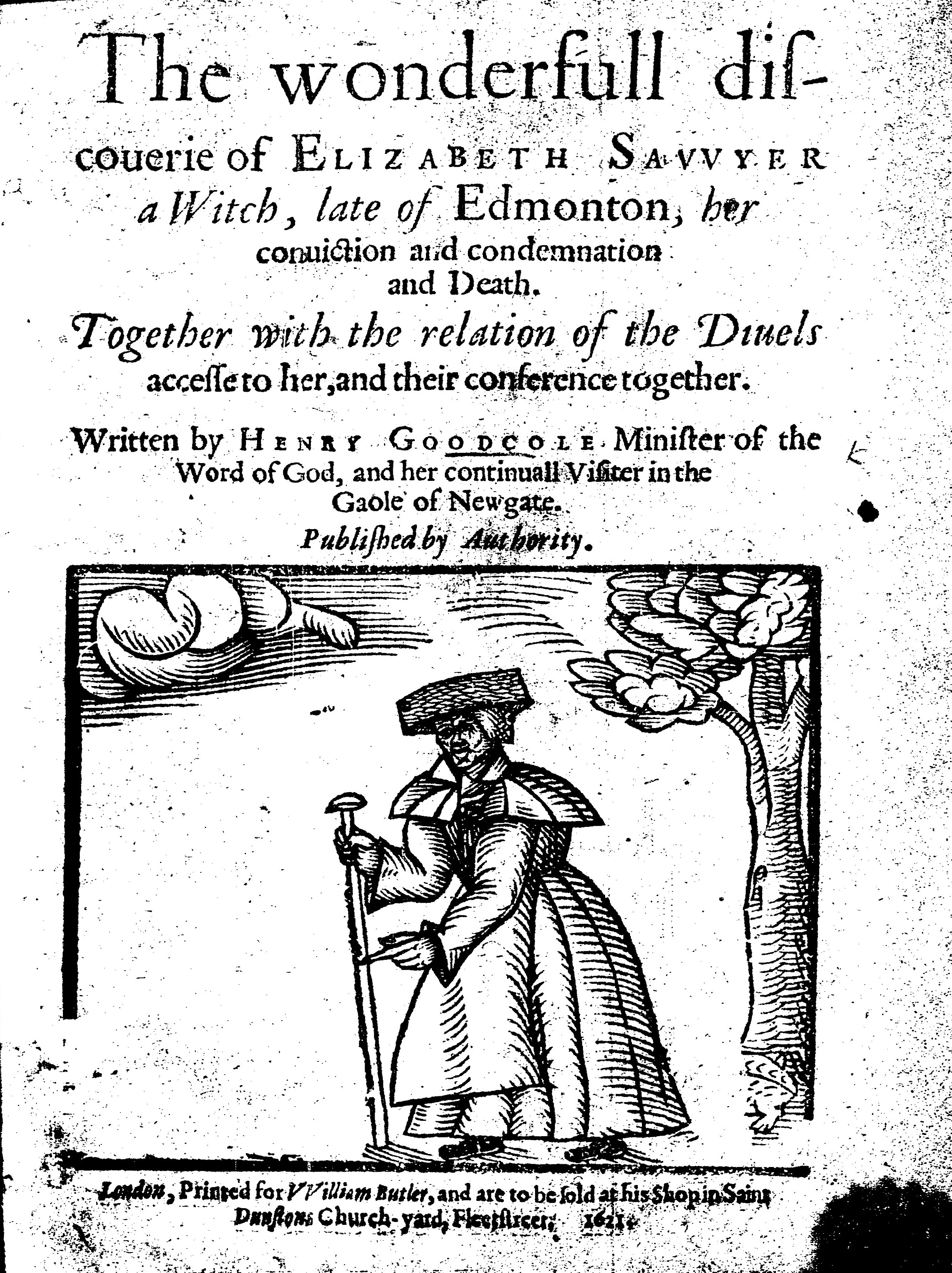
Title page of The wonderfull discoverie of Elizabeth Sawyer a Witch by Henry Goodcole (1621)

Sawyer's was arraigned on charges of witchcraft and murder on 14 April 1621. Her trial was described in a pamphlet by the Reverend Henry Goodcole, entitled The Wonderfull Discoverie of Elizabeth Sawyer, a Witch, late of Edmonton, her conviction and condemnation and Death, which was published shortly afterward. The pamphlet records Sawyer's alleged crimes, among which was the charge that she had caused the death of her neighbor, Agnes Ratcleife, after Ratcleife had struck one of Sawyer's sows while it was eating her soap. She was also accused of the death of two unnamed children. At the trial, Sawyer's husband testified against her. Three women, who were enlisted by the court to search her body for a witch's mark, claimed to have found a teat-like growth near her anus. Goodcole also records an interrogation in which Sawyer confessed and provided a detailed account of her eight-year relationship with the Devil, who, she said, visited her three times a week in the form of a dog named Tom. She was judged guilty and hanged at Tyburn on 19 April 1621.

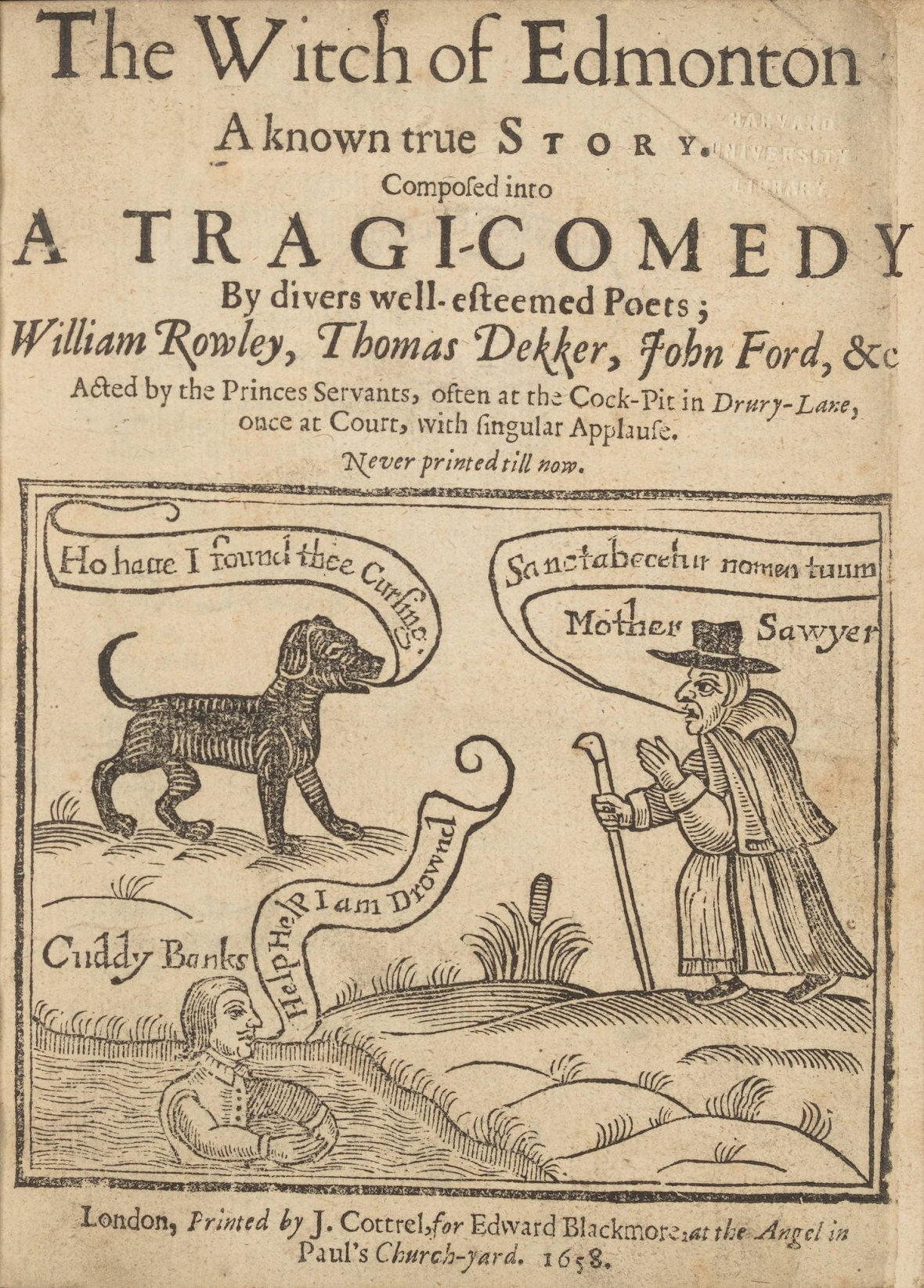
Title page of the play The Witch of Edmonton, by Thomas Dekker, John Ford, and William Rowley (1658)

Sawyer's trial was one of the most publicized witch trials of the Jacobean period. In addition to Goodcole's pamphlet, it inspired broadside ballads (none of which survive) and a successful play, The Witch of Edmonton, by Thomas Dekker, John Ford, and William Rowley, first performed in 1621 and published in 1658.
