= A Haunting on the Hill =

Horror novel by Elizabeth Hand

- Author: Elizabeth Hand
- Language: English
- Genre: Horror
- Publisher: Mulholland Books
- Publication place: US
- English publication date: October, 2023
- Awards: Shirley Jackson Award
- ISBN: 9780316527323

A Haunting on the Hill is a Gothic horror novel by Elizabeth Hand. The story is an authorized sequel to Shirley Jackson's The Haunting of Hill House.

== Synopsis ==
Holly Sherwin is a struggling playwright who is overjoyed when she wins a $10,000 grant that would allow her to develop her play Witching Night, a feminist re-telling of the story of the innocent Elizabeth Sawyer, who was accused, tried and hanged for being a witch, in 1621. She leaves behind her job as a teacher to travel to upstate New York, where she discovers Hill House and decides to live in it for a month while she works on her play. She invites her girlfriend Nisa, as well as a small troupe of actors that include Stevie and Amanda to rehearse the play's rough draft.

Soon after the arrival of Nisa and the others, the group begins to experience strange supernatural occurrences in the home, such as unexplained bloodstains, pounding on the walls no one can explain, a re-appearing, giant black hare, cold spots, mysterious voices that haunt the night, and a locked tower that mysteriously appears opened. While initially skeptical, the group begins to slowly admit that the house may indeed be haunted.

== Development ==
A Haunting on the Hill is the first official sequel to Shirley Jackson's The Haunting of Hill House. The Shirley Jackson estate had approached several writers about penning an authorized sequel to the novel, one of which was Elizabeth Hand. The project was placed on hold for unspecified reasons until 2020, when the estate re-approached Hand about writing the novel. She discussed the project with Jackson's son Laurence and came up with the book's general premise, that a small group of theater people would visit the house and experience their own supernatural phenomena.

Hand drew upon her own experiences as a failed playwright and saw the novel as a way to revisit her love of theater and playwriting "in sort of a sideways way". During the writing and development stages Hand was given access to scans of drawings Jackson created of Hill House, which she used as reference material along with the original novel, to ensure that she accurately depicted the house and prior events in The Haunting of Hill House. Hand has stated that she found the project daunting and that she wanted to ensure that she wrote in her own style as opposed to only mimicking Jackson.

== Release ==
A Haunting on the Hill was first published in e-book and hardback format in the United States during October 2023, through Mulholland Books. An audiobook adaptation narrated by Carol Monda was released on the same date, also through Mulholland Books.

== Reception ==
Critical reception for A Haunting on the Hill has been favorable. Gabino Iglesias reviewed the work for NPR, praising it as a "love letter to Hill House" and stating that there were "small echoes of Jackson's novel here, but A Haunting on the Hill is its own thing even if it constantly pays homage to its celebrated predecessor." Reviewers for the New York Times and New Yorker were similarly favorable. Emily Hughes of the New York Times noted that Hand did not try to mimic Jackson's style and that while the novel did not need to have Hill House as a setting, this was part of what made the novel work for them. In contrast, Kristen Roupenian of the New Yorker wrote that at times Hand did mimic Jackson and that the novel was at its most successful when Hand kept to her own writing style.
