= Elizabeth Hand =

American writer (born 1957)

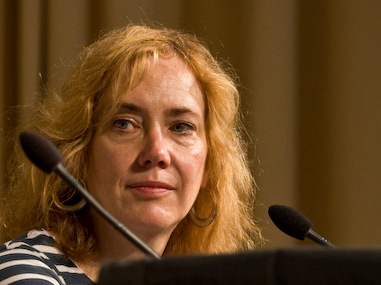
- Elizabeth Hand at Finncon 2007 in Jyväskylä, Finland
- Born: March 29, 1957 (age 69); Yonkers, New York, U.S.
- Education: Catholic University of America
- Occupation: Novelist
- Writing career
- Genres: Science fiction, Fantasy
- Website: elizabethhand.com

Elizabeth Hand (born March 29, 1957) is an American writer.

== Life and career ==
Hand grew up in Yonkers and Pound Ridge, New York. She studied drama and anthropology at the Catholic University of America. Since 1988, Hand has lived in coastal Maine, the setting for many of her stories, and as of 2000 lives in Lincolnville. She also lives part-time in Camden Town, London which has been the setting for Mortal Love and the short story "Cleopatra Brimstone".

Hand's first published story, "Prince of Flowers", appeared in 1988 in The Twilight Zone Magazine, and her first novel, Winterlong, was published in 1990. With Paul Witcover, she created and wrote DC Comics' 1990s cult series Anima. Hand's other works include Æstival Tide (1992); Icarus Descending (1993); Waking the Moon (1994), which won the Tiptree Award and the Mythopoeic Fantasy Award; the post-apocalyptic novel Glimmering (1997); contemporary fantasy Black Light (1999), a New York Times Notable Book; the historical fantasy Mortal Love (2004), a Washington Post Notable Book; the psychological thriller Generation Loss (2007), and the World Fantasy Award-winning "The Maiden Flight of McCauley's Bellerophon". Her story collections are Last Summer at Mars Hill (1998) (which includes the Nebula and World Fantasy award-winning title novella); Bibliomancy (2002), winner of the World Fantasy Award; and Saffron and Brimstone: Strange Stories, which includes the Nebula Award-winning "Echo" (2006). Mortal Love was also shortlisted for the 2005 Mythopoeic Fantasy Award for Adult Literature.

Among Hand's other recent short fiction, "Pavane for a Prince of the Air" (2002) and "Cleopatra Brimstone" (2001) won International Horror Guild Awards. Most recently, she won the Shirley Jackson Award for Generation Loss and the World Fantasy Award in 2008 for Illyria, and the Inkpot Award in 2018.

She also writes movie and television spin-offs, including Star Wars tie-in novels and novelizations of such films as The X-Files and 12 Monkeys. She contributed a Bride of Frankenstein novel to a series of classic movie monster novels published by Dark Horse Comics.

One of Hand's themes from the Winterlong saga is the remorseless exploitation of animal and plant species to create what she calls "geneslaves." Examples include a three-hundred-year-old genetically reconstructed and cerebrally augmented Basilosaurus by the name of Zalophus; the aardmen, hybrids of dog and man; hydrapithecenes, human-fish or human-cuttlefish hybrids somewhat resembling Davy Jones and his crew from the Pirates of the Caribbean film series; and sagittals, whelks genetically engineered to be worn as a bracelet and, when its host feels threatened or agitated, extrude a spine laced with a deadly neurotoxin.

Hand is a longtime reviewer and critic for The Washington Post, Los Angeles Times, Boston Review, Salon, and Village Voice, among others. She also writes a regular review column for The Magazine of Fantasy and Science Fiction.

== Bibliography ==
=== Novels ===
- The Winterlong Trilogy:
  - Winterlong (Bantam Spectra, 1988) – ISBN 0-553-28772-9
  - Æstival Tide (Bantam Spectra, 1992) – ISBN 0-553-29542-X
  - Icarus Descending (Bantam Spectra, 1993) – ISBN 0-553-56288-6
- Waking the Moon (HarperCollins, 1994) – ISBN 0-586-21747-9. Revised in 1995 as a shorter 390-page US edition – ISBN 0-06-105214-0
- Glimmering (HarperPrism, 1997). Revised second edition published by Underland Press, 2012 – ISBN 0-06-100805-2
- Black Light (HarperPrism, 1999) – ISBN 0-06-105266-3
- Mortal Love (HarperCollins, 2004) – ISBN 0-06-105170-5
- The Bride of Frankenstein: Pandora's Bride (Dark Horse Books, 2007). Universal Monsters media tie-in – ISBN 1-59582-035-3
- Radiant Days (Viking, 2012)
- Wylding Hall (PS Publishing, 2015)
- Curious Toys (Mulholland Books, 2019)
- Hokuloa Road (Mulholland Books, 2022)
- A Haunting on the Hill (Mulholland Books, 2023). An authorized sequel to Shirley Jackson's The Haunting of Hill House.

==== Cass Neary Crime Novels ====
- Generation Loss (Small Beer Press, 2007; Influx Press, 2024) – ISBN 1-931520-21-6
- Available Dark (Minotaur Books, 2012; Influx Press, 2025) – ISBN 978-0312585945
- Hard Light (Minotaur Books, 2016; Influx Press, 2027) – ISBN 978-1250030382
- The Book of Lamps and Banners (Mulholland Books, 2020) – ISBN 978-0316485937

==== Chapbooks ====
- Chip Crockett's Christmas Carol (Beccon Publications, 2006). Illustrated by Judith Clute; originally published on Sci Fiction, December 2000 – ISBN 1-870824-49-0.
  - The story is a tribute to entertainers Sandy Becker and Joey Ramone. An online edition of Chip Crockett's Christmas Carol was serialized by Hand on her Livejournal community "theinferior4".
- Illyria (PS Publishing, 2006) – ISBN 1-905834-63-2, ISBN 978-1-905834-63-1

==== Star Wars Expanded Universe ====
- Boba Fett: Maze Of Deception (Scholastic, 2003) – ISBN 0-439-44245-1
- Boba Fett: Hunted (Scholastic, 2003) – ISBN 0-439-33930-8
- Boba Fett: A New Threat (Scholastic, 2004) – ISBN 0-439-33931-6
- Boba Fett: Pursuit (Scholastic, 2004) – ISBN 0-439-33933-2

==== Novelizations ====
- 12 Monkeys (HarperPrism, 1995) – ISBN 0-06-105658-8
- Millennium: The Frenchman (HarperCollins, 1997) – ISBN 0-06-105800-9
- The X-Files: Fight the Future (HarperPrism, 1998) – ISBN 0-06-105932-3
- Anna and the King (HarperEntertainment, 1999) – ISBN 0-06-102045-1
- The Affair of the Necklace (HarperEntertainment, 2001) – ISBN 0-06-107616-3
- Catwoman (Del Rey, 2004) – ISBN 0-345-47652-2

=== Short story collections ===
- Last Summer at Mars Hill (HarperPrism, 1998) – ISBN 0-06-105348-1
- Bibliomancy (PS Publishing, 2003) – ISBN 1-902880-73-0
- Saffron and Brimstone: Strange Stories (M Press, 2006) – ISBN 1-59582-096-5
- Errantry: Strange Stories (Small Beer Press, 2012) – ISBN 1618730304
- The Best of Elizabeth Hand (Subterranean Press, 2021)

=== Individual stories ===
- 1998 "The Darcy Bee"
- 2000 "Chip Crockett's Christmas Carol" on Sci Fiction
- 2002 "Cleopatra Brimstone" in Redshift
- 2003 "The Least Trumps" in Conjunctions 39: The New Wave Fabulists
- 2003 "The Girl With No Name"
- 2004 "The Poet and the Inkmaker's Daughter"
- 2006 "From Mortal Love"
- 2018 "Farrow Street"
- 2021 "For Sale by Owner"
- 2023 "The Seventh Bride, or Female Curiosity"

== Awards ==
Awards for Elizabeth Hand
Work	Year & Award	Category	Result	Ref.
	2018 Inkpot Award		Won	
Winterlong	1990 Philip K. Dick Award		Nominated	
Winterlong	1991 Locus Award	First Novel	Nominated	
Snow on Sugar Mountain	1992 Locus Award	Novelette	Nominated	
Æstival Tide	1992 Philip K. Dick Award		Nominated	
Æstival Tide	1993 Locus Award	SF Novel	Nominated	
In the Month of Athyr	1993 Locus Award	Novelette	Nominated	
Icarus Descending	1993 Philip K. Dick Award		Nominated	
The Erl-King	1994 World Fantasy Award	Novella	Nominated	
Waking the Moon	1995 World Fantasy Award	Novel	Nominated	
Waking the Moon	1995 Otherwise Award		Won	
Waking the Moon	1996 Locus Award	Fantasy Novel	Nominated	
Waking the Moon	1996 Mythopoeic Awards	Adult Literature	Won	
Glimmering	1998 Locus Award	SF Novel	Nominated	
Glimmering	1998 Arthur C. Clarke Award		Finalist	
Last Summer at Mars Hill	1995 Locus Award	Novella	Nominated	
Last Summer at Mars Hill	1995 HOMer Award	Novella	Nominated	
Last Summer at Mars Hill	1995 World Fantasy Award	Novella	Won	
Last Summer at Mars Hill	1996 Nebula Award	Novella	Won	
Last Summer at Mars Hill (Collection)	1999 World Fantasy Award	Collection	Nominated	
Last Summer at Mars Hill (Collection)	1999 Locus Award	Collection	Nominated	
Black Light	2000 Locus Award	Fantasy Novel	Nominated	
Chip Crockett's Christmas Carol	2001 World Fantasy Award	Novella	Nominated	
Chip Crockett's Christmas Carol	2001 Locus Award	Novella	Nominated	
Cleopatra Brimstone	2001 International Horror Guild Award	Long Fiction	Won	
Cleopatra Brimstone	2002 World Fantasy Award	Novella	Nominated	
Cleopatra Brimstone	2002 Locus Award	Novella	Nominated	
Pavane for a Prince of the Air	2002 International Horror Guild Award	Intermediate Form	Won	
Pavane for a Prince of the Air	2003 Locus Award	Novelette	Nominated	
The Least Trumps	2003 Locus Award	Novella	Nominated	
The Least Trumps	2003 World Fantasy Award	Novella	Nominated	
Bibliomancy	2003 International Horror Guild Award	Collection	Nominated	
Bibliomancy	2003 Bram Stoker Award	Fiction Collection	Nominated	
Bibliomancy	2004 World Fantasy Award	Collection	Won	
Bibliomancy	2004 Locus Award	Collection	Nominated	
Mortal Love	2004 International Horror Guild Award	Novel	Nominated	
Mortal Love	2005 Locus Award	Fantasy Novel	Nominated	
Mortal Love	2005 Mythopoeic Awards	Adult Literature	Nominated	
Wonderwall	2005 Locus Award	Short Story	Nominated	
Calypso in Berlin	2006 Locus Award	Short Story	Nominated	
Saffron and Brimstone: Strange Stories	2007 Locus Award	Collection	Nominated	
The Saffron Gatherers	2007 Locus Award	Short Story	Nominated	
Generation Loss	2007 International Horror Guild Award	Novel	Nominated	
Generation Loss	2007 Believer Book Award		Nominated	
Generation Loss	2008 Shirley Jackson Award	Novel	Won	
Echo	2007 Nebula Award	Short Story	Won	
Illyria	2008 Shirley Jackson Award	Novella	Nominated	
Illyria	2008 Locus Award	Novella	Nominated	
Illyria	2008 World Fantasy Award	Novella	Won	
Winter's Wife	2008 Locus Award	Novelette	Nominated	
The Maiden Flight of McCauley's Bellerophon	2011 Locus Award	Novella	Nominated	
The Maiden Flight of McCauley's Bellerophon	2011 World Fantasy Award	Novella	Won	
The Maiden Flight of McCauley's Bellerophon	2011 Hugo Award	Novella	Nominated	
The Maiden Flight of McCauley's Bellerophon	2011 Theodore Sturgeon Award	Short Science Fiction	2nd Place	
Near Zennor	2012 Shirley Jackson Award	Novella	Won	
Near Zennor	2012 Locus Award	Novella	Nominated	
Near Zennor	2012 World Fantasy Award	Novella	Nominated	
Near Zennor	2012 British Fantasy Award	Novella	Nominated	
Available Dark	2012 Romantic Times Book Reviews	The Reviewers' Choice Award - Contemporary Mystery	Won	
Erranty: Strange Stories	2012 Bram Stoker Award	Fiction Collection	Nominated	
Erranty: Strange Stories	2013 Shirley Jackson Award	Collection	Nominated	
Erranty: Strange Stories	2013 Locus Award	Collection	Nominated	
Radiant Days	2013 Locus Award	Young Adult Book	Nominated	
Wylding Hall	2016 Shirley Jackson Award	Novella	Won	
Wylding Hall	2016 Locus Award	Fantasy Novel	Nominated	
Hard Light	2016 Bram Stoker Award	Novel	Nominated	
Fire	2018 Locus Award	Short Story	Nominated	
Curious Toys	2020 Shirley Jackson Award	Novel	Nominated	
Curious Toys	2020 Locus Award	Horror Novel	Nominated	
The Book of Lamps and Banners	2021 Locus Award	Fantasy Novel	Nominated	
For Sale by Owner	2022 World Fantasy Award	Novella	Nominated	
For Sale by Owner	2022 Locus Award	Novelette	Nominated	
The Best of Elizabeth Hand	2022 Locus Award	Collection	Nominated	
A Haunting on the Hill	2023 The Dracula Society	Children of the Night Award	Nominated	
A Haunting on the Hill	2024 Locus Award	Horror Novel	Nominated	
A Haunting on the Hill	2024 Shirley Jackson Award	Special Award	Won	

=== Book reviews ===
Year	Review article	Work(s) reviewed
2000	Hand, Elizabeth (May 2000). "Books". F&SF. 98 (5): 29–34. Archived from the original on December 27, 2004.	Bailey, Dale (1999). American nightmares : the haunted house formula in American popular fiction. Bowling Green State University Popular Press.
2011	Hand, Elizabeth (July–August 2011). "Books". F&SF. 121 (1&2): 42–48. Archived from the original on August 6, 2011.	Pacitti, Tony (2010). My best friend is a Wookie. Adams Media.; Yu, Charles (2010). How to live in a science fictional universe. Pantheon.; Kimmel, Daniel M. (2011). Jar Jar Binks must die ... and other observations about science fiction movies. Fantastic Books.
