= The Three Musketeers in film =

List of films based on The Three Musketeers

The Three Musketeers, the 1844 novel by author Alexandre Dumas, has been adapted into numerous films, both live-action and animated.

== Films ==
=== Live-action ===
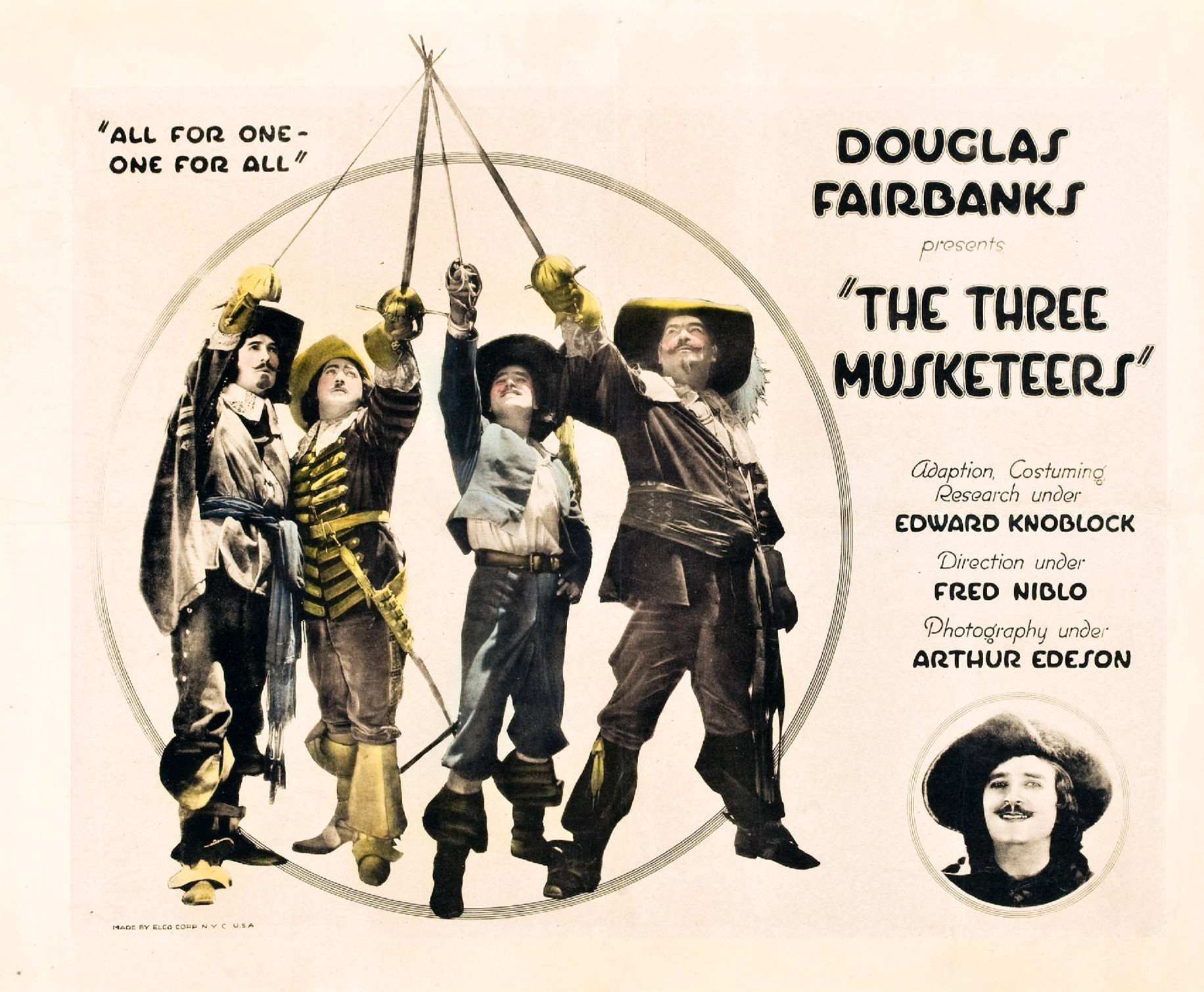
The Three Musketeers (1921)

- The Three Musketeers, a 1903 French production about which very little is known
- The Three Musketeers: Part 1 and Part 2, 1911 silent film shorts from Edison Studios starring Sydney Booth (a member of the Booth family) as D'Artagnan
- Les trois mousquetaires, 1913, French silent film serial directed by André Calmettes, which ran in two installments: La haine de Richelieu and Le triomphe de d’Artagnan
- The Three Musketeers, a 1914 American film directed by Charles V. Henkel and starring Earl Talbot
- The Three Musketeers (1916), a Hollywood feature directed by Charles Swickard, supervised by Thomas H. Ince and including in its cast Louise Glaum as Milady de Winter and Dorothy Dalton as Queen Anne
- Les Trois Mousquetaires, a 1921 French film featuring Aimé Simon-Girard and Claude Mérelle. A blockbuster of its day, it spawned a number of sequels. (An adaptation of Twenty Years After was released the following year.)
- The Three Musketeers (1921), starring Douglas Fairbanks
- Les Trois Mousquetaires (1933), a French talkie remake of the 1921 French film, with the same director (Henri Diamant-Berger) and much of the same cast
- The Three Musketeers (1933 serial), a Mascot Studios serial featuring John Wayne, updated and set in North Africa, with the Musketeers replaced by French Foreign Legionnaires
- The Three Musketeers (1935), featuring Walter Abel
- The Four Musketeers (1936), an Italian adventure film. It reportedly involved the use of three thousand marionettes.
- The Three Musketeers (1939), a comedic version starring Don Ameche and the Ritz Brothers
- Los Tres Mosqueteros (1942), a Mexican movie directed by Miguel M. Delgado and starring Cantinflas as D'Artagnan
- The Three Musketeers (1946), an Argentinian/Uruguayan film
- The Three Musketeers (1948), an MGM production starring Gene Kelly, Van Heflin, Lana Turner, June Allyson, and Angela Lansbury
- The Three Musketeers (1953), directed by André Hunebelle and featuring Georges Marchal and Bourvil
- Los tres mosqueteros y medio (1957), a Mexican comedic version starring Tin-Tan
- Les Trois Mousquetaires (1959), movie with Jean-Paul Belmondo, Daniel Sorano, Jean Chevrier and Hubert Noël
- The Three Musketeers (1961), a double-feature adaptation directed by Bernard Borderie, with Gérard Barray, Mylène Demongeot, Guy Delorme and Jean Carmet
- The Three Musketeers (1969), a television movie starring Kenneth Welsh and featuring Christopher Walken
- The Three Musketeers (1973) and The Four Musketeers (1974), a two-part faithful film adaptation starring Michael York, Charlton Heston, Raquel Welch, Oliver Reed, Frank Finlay, Faye Dunaway, Richard Chamberlain, and Spike Milligan
- D'Artagnan and Three Musketeers (1978), a popular Soviet musical featuring Mikhail Boyarsky
- The Return of the Musketeers (1989), a sequel to The Three Musketeers (1973), and The Four Musketeers (1974), also starring Michael York, Oliver Reed, Frank Finlay and Richard Chamberlain
- The Three Musketeers (1993), a Disney production starring Charlie Sheen, Kiefer Sutherland, Chris O'Donnell, Oliver Platt, Tim Curry, and Rebecca De Mornay
- The Man in the Iron Mask (1998), starring Leonardo DiCaprio, Jeremy Irons, John Malkovich, Gérard Depardieu, and Gabriel Byrne
- O Trapalhão e a Luz Azul (1999), a Brazilian movie who heavily featured the Musketeers, with Rodrigo Santoro portraying D'Artagnan
- The Musketeer (2001), a very loose adaptation, in a style imitating Asian action movies
- Three Musketeers (2004 musical), a musical film with Volodymyr Zelenskyy, in which the three musketeers are women
- D'Artagnan et les trois mousquetaires (2005), starring Vincent Elbaz
- The Three Musketeers (2011), a 3D version directed by Paul W. S. Anderson and starring Logan Lerman and Ray Stevenson, Luke Evans, Christoph Waltz, Mads Mikkelsen, Orlando Bloom, Milla Jovovich, Gabriella Wilde and Matthew Macfadyen
- 3 Musketeers, a 2011 direct-to-video modern action adaptation produced by The Asylum
- The Three Musketeers (2013), a Russian historical adventure film
- The Fourth Musketeer (2022), a British adventure film featuring Sean Cronin as Rochefort
- The Three Musketeers: D'Artagnan and The Three Musketeers: Milady, a 2023 two-part French adventure film saga starring François Civil, Vincent Cassel, Pio Marmaï, Romain Duris and Eva Green

=== Animated ===
- Three Blind Mouseketeers, a 1936 Disney Silly Symphony cartoon starring the voices of Billy Bletcher, and Pinto Colvig
- The Two Mouseketeers, a 1952 Tom and Jerry cartoon, with three follow-ups: Touché, Pussy Cat!, Tom and Chérie and Royal Cat Nap
- The Three Musketeers in Boots, a 1972 anime from Toei Animation featuring cats as the main characters
- The Three Musketeers, a 1974 animated feature film directed by John Halas
- Dog in Boots (1981), Soyuzmultfilm's animated parody film directed by Yefim Gamburg
- The Three Musketeers (1986), an Australian made-for-television animated adventure film from Burbank Films Australia
- The Three Musketeers (1992), a production using classical music
- Mickey, Donald, Goofy: The Three Musketeers (2004), another Disney remake, this one is a made-for-video film.
- Barbie and the Three Musketeers (2009), a direct-to-video Barbie movie in which the Musketeers are female

== Films based on sequels of the novel ==
- The Return of the Musketeers (1989), a film version of Twenty Years After by the team responsible for the 1973 and 1974 films and is a direct sequel to them, featuring much of the same cast
- Musketeers Twenty Years After (1992), a Russian musical featuring Mikhail Boyarsky, sequel to D'Artagnan and Three Musketeers
- The Secret of Queen Anna, or Musketeers Thirty Years After (1993), a Russian musical based on The Vicomte de Bragelonne and starring Mikhail Boyarsky as d'Artagnan (see also The Return of the Musketeers, or The Treasures of Cardinal Mazarin below)
- The King's Musketeers (2018), an Italian comedy film loosely based on Twenty Years After.

Many films have been based in whole or in part on the final section of the final novel of the trilogy, The Vicomte de Bragelonne; see Man in the Iron Mask in popular culture.

== Films featuring "descendants" of the Musketeers ==
- At Sword's Point (1952), an RKO Radio picture starring Cornel Wilde, Dan O'Herlihy, Alan Hale, Jr., and Maureen O'Hara as the sons and daughter of the original Musketeers
- Ring of the Musketeers (1992), a TV movie directed by John Paragon, starring David Hasselhoff, Thomas Gottschalk, Cheech Marin, Alison Doody, John Rhys-Davies, and Corbin Bernsen. Set in modern times, the descendants of the Musketeers protect the innocent.
- The Return of the Musketeers, or The Treasures of Cardinal Mazarin (2009), a Russian musical starring Mikhail Boyarsky as d'Artagnan, who, with the other Musketeers, return from the dead to save their sons and daughters (see also The Secret of Queen Anna, or Musketeers Thirty Years After in the previous section)
- Revenge of the Musketeers (1994) (The Daughter of d'Artagnan), a French production starring Sophie Marceau in the title role, and Philippe Noiret as an aged d'Artagnan
- La Femme Musketeer (2004), a made-for-TV production starring Susie Amy as d'Artagnan's daughter "Valentine", with Michael York, Gérard Depardieu, Christopher Cazenove, John Rhys-Davies, and Nastassja Kinski

== Other ==
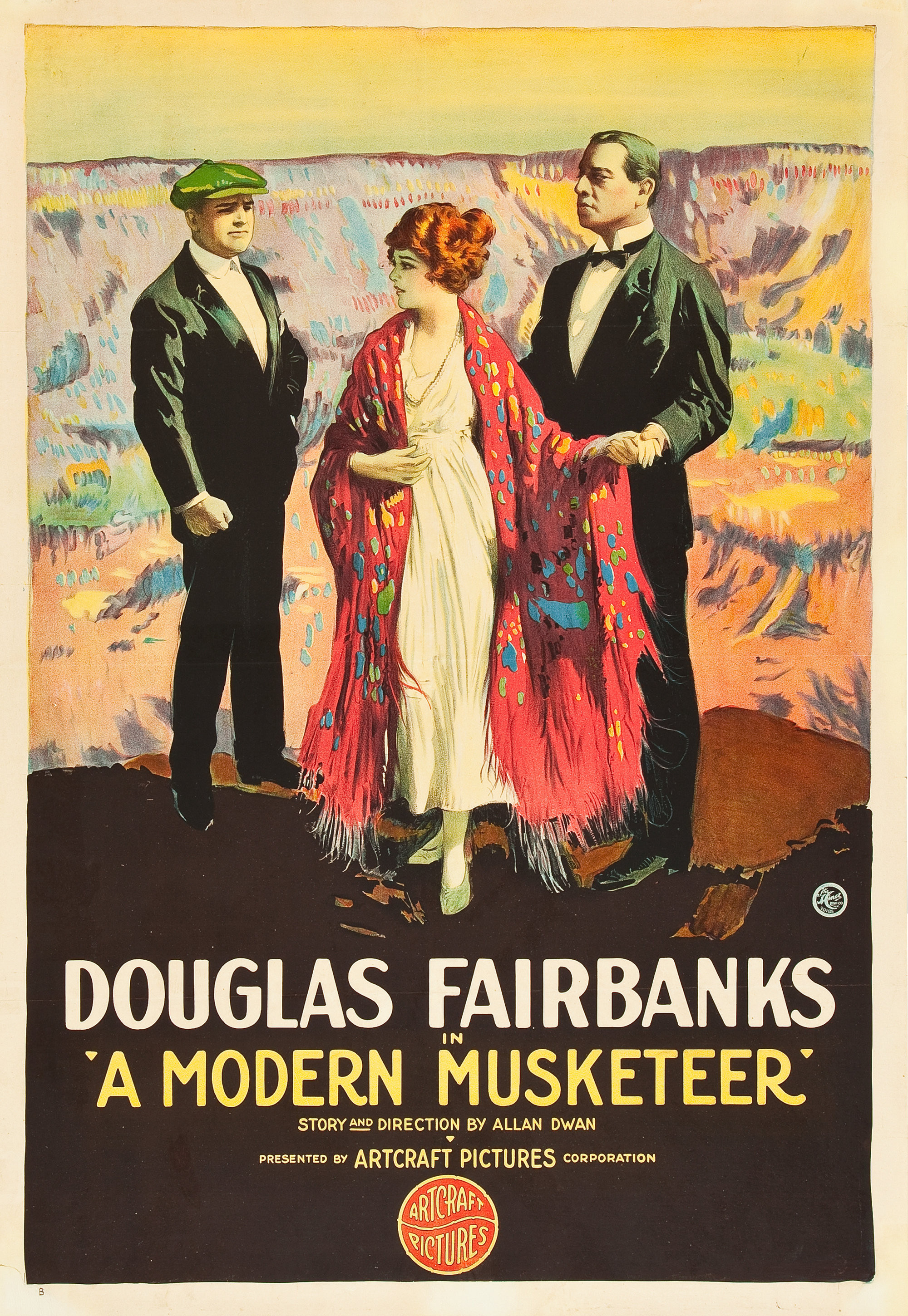
A Modern Musketeer (1917)

- The Queen's Musketeers (1903)
- A Modern Musketeer (1917), in which Douglas Fairbanks plays both D'Artagnan and his modern-day emulator
- The Three Must-Get-Theres (1922)
- The Gay Swordsman (Italian: Il figlio di d'Artagnan) (1950)
- Milady and the Musketeers (1952), a prequel about Athos and Milady de Winter, starring Yvette Lebon, Rossano Brazzi and Massimo Serato
- Knights of the Queen (Italian: I cavalieri della regina) (1954)
- The King's Musketeers (Italian: Le avventure dei tre moschettieri) (1957)
- La spada imbattibile (1957)
- Le imprese di una spada leggendaria (1958)
- Mantelli e spade insanguinate (1959)
- The Secret Mark of D'Artagnan (Italian: Il colpo segreto di D'Artagnan, French: Le secret de d'Artagnan) (1962)
- Zorro and the Three Musketeers (Italian: Zorro e i tre moschettieri) (1963)
- The Four Musketeers (1963)
- Revenge of the Musketeers (Italian: D'Artagnan contro i tre moschettieri) (1963)
- Cyrano and d'Artagnan (French: Cyrano et d'Artagnan) (1964)
- The Sex Adventures of the Three Musketeers (German: Die Sexabenteuer der drei Musketiere) (1971)
- They Were Called Three Musketeers But They Were Four (Italian: Li chiamavano i tre moschettieri... invece erano quattro) (1973)
- The Three Musketeers of the West (Italian: Tutti per uno... botte per tutti) (1973)
- The Four Charlots Musketeers (1974) and The Four Charlots Musketeers 2 (1974), a two-part comedy parody starring Les Charlots as the Musketeers' valets
- The Crazy Story of the Three Musketeers (Spanish: La loca historia de los tres mosqueteros) (1983)
- D'Artagnan Junior (French: Le Fou du roi) (1984)
- Milady (2004)

== Television ==
- The Three Musketeers, a 1954 BBC adaptation in six 30-minute episodes, starring Laurence Payne, Roger Delgado, Paul Whitsun-Jones and Paul Hansard
- The Three Musketeers, a 1966 BBC adaptation in ten 25-minute episodes, directed by Peter Hammond and starring Jeremy Brett, Jeremy Young, and Brian Blessed
- The Three Musketeers (American TV series), a series of animated shorts produced by Hanna-Barbera in 1968 as part of The Banana Splits television show
- The Three Musketeers, a 1973 Australian made-for-TV cartoon, one of a series of Famous Classic Tales adaptations
- Dogtanian and the Three Muskehounds, a 1981 Spanish animated TV series that faithfully adapts the novel and depicts the main characters as anthropomorphic dogs
  - The Return of Dogtanian, a 1989 animated sequel series which takes place 10 years after the original and is loosely based on the novel The Vicomte de Bragelonne, also written by Dumas
- The Three Musketeers Anime (Anime Sanjūshi), a Japanese animated series produced by Gakken
- Young Blades, a television series that aired on PAX
- The Three Musketeers (2013 TV series), a Russian series directed by Sergey Zhigunov and Alexey Zlobin
- The Musketeers, a 2014 BBC series by Adrian Hodges
- The Three Musketeers, a 2014 South Korean series set in Joseon-era Korea

== See also ==
- The d'Artagnan Romances
- The Three Mesquiteers, a series of 51 western B-movies released between 1936 and 1943
- The Three Musketeers (disambiguation)
