= The Three Musketeers (1969 film) =

- The Three Musketeers
- Genre: Television film
- Based on: The Three Musketeers by Alexandre Dumas
- Story by: Peter Raby
- Directed by: John Hirsch
- Starring: Colin Fox; Powys Thomas; Kenneth Welsh; James Blendick
- Music by: Raymond Pannell
- Country of origin: Canada
- Original language: English

Production
- Producer: David Gardner
- Running time: 2 hours
- Production company: Stratford National Theatre

Original release
- Network: CBC Television
- Release: March 19, 1969

The Three Musketeers is a 1969 Canadian television film based on the Stratford National Theatre's adaptation of Alexandre Dumas's 1844 novel The Three Musketeers. It stars Kenneth Welsh as d'Artagnan. The Three Musketeers, Athos, Porthos and Aramis, are played by Powys Thomas, James Blendick and Colin Fox.

== Premise ==
A young man named d'Artagnan leaves home to travel to Paris, with the intention to join the Musketeers. Although d'Artagnan is not able to join this elite corps immediately, he befriends the three most formidable musketeers of the age — Athos, Porthos and Aramis — and gets involved in affairs of the state and court.

== Cast ==
- Colin Fox as Aramis
- Powys Thomas as Athos
- Kenneth Welsh as d'Artagnan
- James Blendick as Porthos
- Leo Ciceri as Cardinal Richelieu
- Martha Henry as Lady Sabine DeWinter
- Eric Donkin as King Louis XIII
- Christopher Walken as John Felton

== Background ==
The film was based on a play previously performed by the Stratford National Theatre in 1968. The film was shot on location entirely in Toronto over a thirteen day shoot in January 1969. Director John Hirsch said "we didn't want to capture the words as much as the flavor ... It's the action that counts, the energy, the vitality". Hirsch also highlighted the fourteen separately staged fights, and praised Peter Raby for an "extraordinary achievement of condensing the whole novel into two hours".

== Reception ==
The Calgary Herald said "watching the film wasn't what you would call a chore ... it was fast paced and overloaded with action ... the story was almost secondary ... it was the swashbuckling that really mattered". The Toronto Star criticized the film, saying, "where film has so often failed to capture the spectacle, the action, the intrigue, the ardor, and above all the plumed and extravagant glamor, why expect television to succeed ... bringing the Stratford National Theatre production of the Three Musketeers to the small screen, CBC-TV provided a fatiguing demonstration of the perfectly obvious". The Province opined that it was "one of the biggest, most complex and spectacular dramas ever produced by CBC ... The Three Musketeers rivals in scope last season's 2¼-hour production of Dr. Jekyll and Mr. Hyde".

== See also ==
- List of American films of 1969
