= D'Artagnan and Three Musketeers =

1978 film directed by George Jungvald-Khilkevitch

- Written by: Alexandre Dumas, père Mark Rozovsky
- Directed by: Georgi Yungvald-Khilkevich
- Starring: Mikhail Boyarsky; Veniamin Smekhov; Igor Starygin; Valentin Smirnitsky
- Music by: Maksim Dunayevsky
- Country of origin: Soviet Union
- Original language: Russian

Production
- Cinematography: Aleksandr Polynnikov
- Editor: Tamara Prokopenko
- Running time: 248 minutes (3 parts)

Original release
- Release: 24 December – 26 December 1979

D'Artagnan and Three Musketeers (Russian: «Д'Артаньян и три мушкетёра», romanized: D'Artanyan i tri mushketyora) is a three-part swashbuckler musical miniseries produced in the Soviet Union and first aired in 1979. It is based on the 1844 novel The Three Musketeers by Alexandre Dumas, père.

The film stars Mikhail Boyarsky as D'Artagnan, Veniamin Smekhov as Athos, Igor Starygin as Aramis, Valentin Smirnitsky as Porthos, Margarita Terekhova as Milady de Winter, Oleg Tabakov as King Louis XIII, Alisa Freindlich as Anne of Austria, Aleksandr Trofimov as Cardinal Richelieu, and Lev Durov as Captain de Tréville. The film, and its numerous songs became extremely popular in the Soviet Union throughout the late 1970s and early 1980s, and is now considered a classic.

Three sequels were made: Musketeers Twenty Years After (1993), The Secret of Queen Anne or Musketeers Thirty Years After (1994) and The Return of the Musketeers, or The Treasures of Cardinal Mazarin (2009).

== Plot ==
The film consists of three parts:

- Part I: "Athos, Porthos, Aramis and D'Artagnan" (Атос, Портос, Арамис и д'Артаньян)
- Part II: "The Queen's Diamond Studs" (Подвески королевы)
- Part III: "The Adventures Continue" (Приключения продолжаются)

=== Episode One ===
D’Artagnan, a young country bumpkin rides to Paris in hopes of becoming a musketeer. In Meung, he is insulted by Rochefort, an agent of the Cardinal. A fight ensues, and d’Artagnan is robbed and left bleeding.

Later he meets M. De Tréville, captain of the king's musketeers. Suddenly, he sees Rochefort and jumps out the window. He crashes into Athos, a wounded musketeer who calls him an idiot and challenged him to a duel at noon. D’Artagnan continues his chase, crashing into two other musketeers, Porthos and Aramis and gets challenged to two other duels. Arriving for the first duel, Athos duels d’Artagnan until Porthos and Aramis arrive, and are astonished that they will all fight the same boy. The Cardinals Guards arrive and a fight ensues. The musketeers kill most of the guards and a few lucky ones escape. The musketeers make friends. Later d’Artagnan rescues Constance, a married seamstress for the Queen and they fall in love. On the next morning, D'Artagnan meets his friends at a local tavern and tells Athos that he mysteriously got a letter from Cardinal Richelieu, asking to meet with him after sunset. Athos tells D'Artagnan, that he has no choice but to meet with him. D'Artagnan then meets the Cardinal at his estate. He tries to sway D'Artagnan to his side with the promise of wealth, high ranking military career, and respect from the nobility.

Although D'Artagnan declines the offer, Richelieu threatens and warns him of what could happen if he continues to interfere with his plans. D'Artagnan returns to his friends, and tells them he refused to serve the Cardinal, and Athos advises D'Artagnan to be careful with his choices, now that he has made an enemy of Richelieu. Later the same night, Richelieu meets with Milady Winter, one of his best spies and agents, and she tells him that the Duke of Buckingham has arrived in Paris.

=== Episode Two ===
After receiving word from Milady that the Duke has arrived in Paris, the Cardinal sends Rochefort and De Jussac to stop the Duke but it fails, and Rochefort tells him that D'Artagnan aided the Duke in escaping with the Queen's Diamond Studs, which the Queen gave the Duke, her lover, as a gift. Richelieu immediately plots his revenge on the Queen for rejecting him. He goes to her husband, King Louis XIII, whom he easily manipulates into holding a ball in the royal palace in 10 days, and he tells Louis to tell his wife to wear her diamond studs that Louis had previously given her as a present.

Queen Anne, realizing she is in trouble from the Cardinal's wrath, she tells her loyal maid, Constance, to find someone to go to London and back in 10 days to deliver the studs. However, the Cardinal orders Rochefort to close all of France's ports until further notice. Constance recruits D'Artagnan and he recruits his friends and they sent out to London. However, De Jussac races to the port and deploys squads of Cardinal Guards across the countryside with a single order: Stop D'Artaganan, Athos, Porthos, and Aramis at any cost. Although D'Artagnan makes it past the blockade of guards, his friends stay behind to distract the guards. He then battles and defeats De Jussac, again, and steals the Cardinal's letter from him, allowing him to go to London from France's ports. Upon arriving, he discovers that 2 of the 12 diamond studs are stolen by Milady from the Duke. Milady arrives to Richelieu, giving him the studs, which he plans to use to extort the Queen, in return he gives Milady money, and a nobility title. D'Artaganan stays overnight in the Duke's palace, while the Duke orders his jeweler to make 2 new diamond studs to save Anne. The next day D'Artagnan races with the studs to France even riding overnight to desperately make it to Paris to save Constance's life from the Cardinal. He delivers the studs to the Queen saving her and Constance, but Richelieu sends Milady to capture Constance but it fails and she is forced to poison her. Constance dies, and D'Artagnan swears vengeance.

=== Episode Three ===
The Cardinal then manipulates Louis into declaring war on England. D'Artagnan is made a Musketeer and De Tréville promises him the rank of lieutenant if D'Artagnan performs heroic deeds. The Siege of La Rochelle begins with King Louis personally being present and Cardinal Richelieu as Siege Commander. Meanwhile, the Cardinal and Milady orchestrate D'Artagnan's assassination, which fails and the assassin tells him that Milady hired him. D'Artagnan returns to their hotel and tells Athos about this, and Athos tells him the Milady is Lady Winter and she killed Constance. He also tells him the Tragic Story of Count De la Fère who fell in love with Milady, only to discover that she is basically a prostitute who tricks guys and destroys their family's honor, the enraged Count tried to kill her only to be almost killed by her, both thought each other died. Due to Athos' anger and wrath while telling the tale, D'Artagnan figures out that Athos is Count De la Fère.

They then chase after Milady who tried to poison D'Artagnan, but fail. Athos knows that D'Artagnan is close to finding Milady so he and the rest of the Musketeers recruit a retired executioner whose family name was destroyed after Milady seduced his brother. They hunt down Milady and execute her, legally, because they confiscated Richelieu's letter, which allows someone to execute a person with the Cardinal's consent. After returning to the battlefield, they are arrested by Richelieu for Milady's murder, but he is forced to let them go after they show him his letter, allowing them to execute a person with his consent.

Left with no other option, Richelieu offers to reward them by giving them the rank of lieutenant of the King's Musketeers, but the group say they are going to resign from service after the war, and the Richelieu should give it to D'Artagnan instead. Athos says to redeem themselves for leaving the battlefield, the 4 of them to hold of a fortress for an hour under fire without retreat to prove their loyalty to France. Richelieu agrees to give D'Artagnan the rank of lieutenant but only after they hold off the fortress for an hour, hoping that they would die. However, an hour passes, and the 4 musketeers return to camp being hailed as heroes by both the King's Musketeers and the Cardinal Guards. Richelieu, honoring his word, makes D'Artagnan lieutenant of the King's Musketeers.

== Location ==
The miniseries was filmed in different locations around the Ukrainian Soviet Socialist Republic (present-day Ukraine), using several of the country's fortresses and old cities, such as L'viv. Some scenes were filmed in the Historic Centre (Old Town) of Tallinn in Estonia.

== See also ==
- Dog in Boots, an animated parody film that satirizes D'Artagnan and Three Musketeers.
- The Three Musketeers (2013), a Russian film adaptation by Sergei Zhigunov
