= The Three Musketeers (1959 film) =

1959 French TV film

- Directed by: Claude Barma
- Written by: Auguste Maquet; Pierre Nivollet
- Screenplay by: Claude Barma
- Based on: The Three Musketeers; 1844 novel by Alexandre Dumas
- Produced by: Claude Barma
- Starring: Jean-Paul Belmondo; René Alone; Jean-Claude Arnaud
- Cinematography: Georges Leclerc; Jacques Lemare
- Edited by: Andrée Feix
- Music by: Joseph Kosma
- Production company: Radiodiffusion-Télévision Française
- Release date: December 28, 1959
- Running time: (119 minutes
- Country: France
- Language: French

The Three Musketeers (French: Les trois mousquetaires) is a 1959 French TV film based on a play adaptation of the 1844 novel by Alexandre Dumas. It is notable for featuring Jean Paul Belmondo in the lead.

It was directed by Claude Barma and was broadcast live on Christmas Day.

== Cast ==
- Jean-Paul Belmondo as D'Artagnan
- Pierre Asso as Cardinal Richelieu
- Jean Chevrier as Athos
- Georges Descrières as DeWinter
- Bernard Dhéran as Buckingham
- Daniel Sorano as Porthos
- Gaby Sylvia as Milady de Winter

== Production ==
Belmondo was cast on the basis of his success in the play Oscar. He did not make another film for TV until 2001.
