= Musketeers Twenty Years After =

- Directed by: Georgi Yungvald-Khilkevich
- Written by: Alexandre Dumas, père Georgi Yungvald-Khilkevich; Georgi Nikolayev
- Produced by: Georgi Yungvald-Khilkevich; Oleg Batagov; Yuri Kononchuk
- Starring: Mikhail Boyarsky; Veniamin Smekhov; Igor Starygin; Valentin Smirnitsky
- Cinematography: Aleksandr Nosovsky
- Edited by: Irina Blogerman
- Music by: Maksim Dunayevsky
- Production companies: Studio Ekran, Film-studio "Katran", Soviet-French enterprise "Moscow", Odessa Film Studio
- Release date: 1993
- Running time: 300 min.
- Country: Russia
- Language: Russian

Musketeers Twenty Years After (Russian: Мушкетёры двадцать лет спустя, translit. Mushketeri dvadsat' let spustya) is a four-episode Russian musical film directed by Georgi Yungvald-Khilkevich based on Alexandre Dumas' 1845 novel Twenty Years After.

Filming began in the summer of 1990 and took place in Tallinn, Leningrad and Odessa. In August 1991, the main songs of the film, that were performed by Igor Nadzhiev, were recorded. In 1992, editing and dubbing of the movie were completed. And in January 1993, the premiere took place on the Channel One Russia of Ostankino.

The previous film was D'Artagnan and Three Musketeers. The next movie — The Secret of Queen Anne or Musketeers Thirty Years After.

== Plot ==
Cardinal Mazarin demands from Anne of Austria to reveal to him the names of four friends who once helped her in the confrontation against Cardinal Richelieu.

The Queen reveals the name of D'Artagnan, lieutenant of the royal musketeers.

The cardinal calls the musketeer and orders him to find Athos, Porthos and Aramis in order to recruit them. However, only Porthos, who became a wealthy landowner du Vallon, agrees to join D'Artagnan. Athos and Aramis are on the side of the Fronde, hostile to the cardinal and led by the Duke of Beaufort, imprisoned in the Château de Vincennes.

The convergence of old friends, separated by political intrigues, occurs when Mordaunt, the son of Lady Winter, decides to take revenge on the Musketeers for the death of his mother.

Four friends get involved with him, as well as with M. de Jussac, their old enemy, who joined Mordaunt, in the fight.

== Cast ==
- Mikhail Boyarsky as d'Artagnan
- Veniamin Smekhov as Athos
- Valentin Smirnitsky as Porthos
- Igor Starygin as Aramis (voiced by Igor Yasulovich)
- Viktor Avilov as Mordaunt
- Vladimir Balon as de Jussac
- Anatoly Ravikovich as Cardinal Mazarin
- Alisa Freindlich as Anne of Austria
- Igor Dmitriev as Duke of Beaufort
- Oleg Belov as Oliver Cromwell
- Yuri Dubrovin as La Chesnaye
- Jaak Prints as servant for Athos
- Alexander Barablin as Parliament commissar
- Yekaterina Strizhenova as Madeleine
- Aleksei Petrenko as Charles I
- Arnis Līcītis as Lord Winter (voiced by Vladimir Kuznetsov)
- Yuri Sherstnev as Executioner of Lille
- Boris Kashcheyev as Flamarens
- Sergei Boyarski as young Charles II
- Yevgeni Gerchakov as La Bruyère
- Valentin Bukin as du Barthois
- Olga Kabo as Duchesse de Longueville
- Inga Ilm as de Longueville's maid
- Yelena Karadzhova as Queen Henrietta
- Liliya Ivanova as Princess Henrietta
- Vadim Kondryatev as Comminges
- Ermengeld Konovalov as servant for Porthos
- Ivar Kümnik as Musketeer
- Sergei Shnyryov as Raoul, Vicomte de Bragelonne, son of Athos
- Yuliya Sholkova as Louise de la Vallière|young Louise de la Vallière
- Vasili Vekshin as Commander-in-chief of Charles I's army
- Pavel Vinnik as La Ramée
- Larisa Luppian as nun
- Valentin Maslov as the owner of a tavern in the village
- Viktor Pavlovsky as former referee
