= At Sword's Point =

1952 film by Lewis Allen

- Directed by: Lewis Allen
- Written by: Aubrey Wisberg; Jack Pollexfen
- Produced by: Jerrold T. Brandt
- Starring: Cornel Wilde; Maureen O'Hara
- Cinematography: Ray Rennahan
- Edited by: Samuel E. Beetley; Robert Golden
- Music by: Roy Webb; Constantin Bakaleinikoff
- Color process: Technicolor
- Production company: RKO Radio Pictures
- Distributed by: RKO Radio Pictures
- Release date: April 9, 1952 (New York)
- Running time: 81 minutes
- Country: United States
- Language: English

At Sword's Point, also known as Sons of the Three Musketeers, is a 1952 American historical action adventure film directed by Lewis Allen and starring Cornel Wilde and Maureen O'Hara. It was shot in Technicolor by RKO Radio Pictures. The film was completed in 1949 but was not released until 1952.

The sons of Aramis, Porthos and D'Artagan, along with Claire, the daughter of Athos, are reunited by the aging Queen Anne to halt the villainy of her treacherous nephew, the Duc de Lavalle.

== Plot ==
The sons and a daughter of the original Four Musketeers ride to the rescue of besieged Queen Anne in 1648 France.

D'Artagnan and his companions are alerted that the terminally ill queen is being pressured by the evil Duc de Lavalle into agreeing to a marriage with Princess Henriette. Unable to respond, the musketeers send their sons and daughter to the royal court to help.

The men are imprisoned and betrayed, and a romance forms between D'Artagnan Jr. and Claire.

== Cast ==
- Cornel Wilde as D'Artagnan
- Maureen O'Hara as Claire
- Robert Douglas as Duc de Lavalle
- Gladys Cooper as Queen Anne
- June Clayworth as Comtesse Claudine
- Dan O'Herlihy as Aramis
- Alan Hale Jr. as Porthos
- Blanche Yurka as Madame Michom
- Nancy Gates as Princess Henriette
- Edmund Breon as Queen's Chamberlain
- Peter Miles as Young Louis XIV
- George Petrie as Chalais
- Moroni Olsen as Porthos
- Lucien Littlefield as Cpl. Gautier (uncredited)

== Production ==
In 1947, Republic Pictures announced the purchase of the script Sons of the Musketeers by Aubrey Wisberg and Jack Pollexfen. Eagle Lion also announced a film titled Sons of the Musketeers, a concern for MGM, which was planning the 1948 film The Three Musketeers. Eventually the project went to RKO where it was devised as a vehicle for Cornel Wilde. Lewis Allen was announced as director on November 15, 1949. Filming began on December 14, 1949.

MGM experienced difficulties depicting Cardinal Richelieu in The Three Musketeers, so the filmmakers decided to not include Cardinal Mazarin in At Sword's Point, although the character appears in the original script.

Porthos is played by Moroni Olsen, who played the same character in the 1935 film of the original 1844 Alexandre Dumas novel The Three Musketeers. Alan Hale Jr., who plays the son of Porthos, was the son of Alan Hale Sr., who appeared in The Man in the Iron Mask (1939) as an aging Porthos.

In The Fifth Musketeer (1979), which retells the story of The Man in the Iron Mask, two of the young musketeers from At Sword's Point reappear in the roles of their own fathers: Wilde stars as D'Artagnan and Hale Jr. as Porthos.

== Reception ==
In a contemporary review for The New York Times, critic Howard Thompson called the film "an assembly-line mixture of thundering hoofs, bobbing plumes and clashing rapiers" and wrote: "Mr. Brandt has staged a handsomely mounted eighteenth-century track meet on horseback, abrim with muscularity but so woodenly designed and enacted that even the stanchest adventure rooters are likely to flinch between rounds. ... 'At Sword's Point' remains about as dull as they come."
