= The Secret of Queen Anne or Musketeers Thirty Years After =

- Directed by: Georgi Yungvald-Khilkevich
- Written by: Alexandre Dumas, père Georgi Yungvald-Khilkevich; Georgi Nikolayev
- Produced by: Georgi Yungvald-Khilkevich
- Starring: Mikhail Boyarsky; Veniamin Smekhov; Igor Starygin; Valentin Smirnitsky
- Music by: Maksim Dunayevsky
- Production company: Film-studio "Katran" with the participation of the Odessa Film Studio
- Release date: 1994
- Running time: 158 min. (2 episodes, 79 min. each)
- Country: Russia
- Language: Russian

The Secret of Queen Anne or Musketeers Thirty Years After (Russian: Тайна королевы Анны, или Мушкетёры тридцать лет спустя; translit. Taina korolevi Anni, ili Mushketeri tritsat' let spustya) is a 1992 Russian swashbuckler film directed by Georgi Yungvald-Khilkevich based loosely on Alexandre Dumas' 1847-1850 novel The Vicomte of Bragelonne: Ten Years Later.

Filming began in the summer of 1990 and ended in the autumn of 1991. Sound and editing took place in 1992. The premiere of the movie took place only on March 7-8 1994 on the first Ostankino channel.

The filming locations were Tallinn, Leningrad, Odessa, and the Karakum desert, which is located on the territory of Turkmenistan.

The previous film - Musketeers Twenty Years After, the next one - The Return of the Musketeers, or The Treasures of Cardinal Mazarin.

== Plot ==
First episode. King of England Charles II asks King of France Louis XIV to help establish himself on the throne. However, Louis refuses him under the influence of Cardinal Mazarin. D'Artagnan, together with Porthos, captures the enemy of Charles — General Monk. At the same time, Athos takes out a million gold pieces, which the King of England also needs to fulfill his goals.

The second series tells us more about Aramis, who by this time had become a general of the Jesuit Order and Bishop of Vannes. He, together with the son of Athos, Raul, conspires against Louis. Aramis wants to rescue the king's imprisoned twin brother in order to exchange one for the other.

== Cast ==
- Mikhail Boyarsky as d'Artagnan
- Veniamin Smekhov as Athos
- Valentin Smirnitsky as Porthos
- Igor Starygin as Aramis (voiced by Igor Yasulovich)
- Alisa Freindlich as Anne of Austria
- Dmitry Kharatyan as King Louis XIV and Philip Marchiali
- Ivar Kümnik as Drunken
- Anatoly Ravikovich as Cardinal Mazarin
- Alexei Yasulovich as Karl II
- Andrei Sokolov as Raul, Vicomte de Bragelonne, son of Athos
- Katri Khorma as Luisa d'Lavalier
- Yuri Dubrovin as La Schene
- Arūnas Storpirštis as Monk
- Pavel Vinnik as La Rame
- Yekaterina Strizhenova as Madlen
- Jüri Järvet as General of the Jesuit Order
- Vladimir Laptev as Digbi
- Anatoli Stolbov
- Yana Poplavskaya
- Alla Budnitskaya as Duchess of Orleans
- Igor Mang
- Ivo Eensalu
- Vladimir Maltsev
- Alexander Zadokhin
- Oleg Rogachov
- Andriy Zay

== See also ==
- Man in the Iron Mask
