= Georgi Yungvald-Khilkevich =

Russian film director (1934–2015)

- Born: 22 October 1934; Tashkent, Uzbek SSR, Soviet Union
- Died: 11 November 2015 (aged 81); Moscow, Russia
- Occupations: Film director; screenwriter
- Years active: 1966–2009

Georgi Emilyevich Yungvald-Khilkevich (Russian: Георгий Эмильевич Юнгвальд-Хилькевич; 22 October 1934 – 11 November 2015) was a Soviet and Russian film director, screenwriter, producer, actor, theatre director and set designer. He was known for his musicals and Alexandre Dumas adaptations. He directed 22 motion pictures and television films between 1966 and 2009. He received the title of Honored Artist of the RSFSR (1990) and Ukraine (1995).

== Biography ==
Georgi Yungvald-Khilkevich was born into a theatrical family of noble heritage. His mother Nina Ivanovna Buiko was a ballet dancer. His maternal grandfather Ivan Petrovich Buiko came from an old Russian family and served as a colonel in the Imperial Russian Army and a commandant in Warsaw. He joined Bolsheviks in 1917. Georgi's father Emil Iosifovich Yungvald-Khilkevich was an acclaimed theater director and one of the founders of the Uzbek National Theater of Opera and Ballet (later Navoi Theater). His paternal grandfather came from Polish szlachta (nobility) and owned railroads in western Ukraine, while his wife Elena Cavalieri was an Italian; she was said to be the sister of the famous opera singer Lina Cavalieri who was very popular in the Russian Empire and regularly visited Kiev with concerts.

Georgi Yungvald-Khilkevich graduated from the Ostrovsky Tashkent Theatrical Institute in 1963. He worked as a set designer at Tashkent theaters and film studios. In 1966 he finished directing and screenwriting Mosfilm courses and started working at the Odessa Film Studio, where he later directed most of his movies.

His first major breakthrough happened in 1969 with the musical film Dangerous Tour loosely based on the memoirs of Alexandra Kollontai. The screenplay was written with Vladimir Vysotsky in mind, who eventually played the main part, wrote all the songs and did some uncredited contribution to the final draft. His partners were Nikolai Grinko, Yefim Kopelyan, Ivan Pereverzev and Georgi Yumatov. The film became one of the leaders of the Soviet box office in 1970 (9th place).

In 1978, Khilkevich turned to Alexandre Dumas who happened to be one of his favourite writers since childhood. His 3-part made-for-TV adventure musical D'Artagnan and Three Musketeers was an ultimate success, with many songs and catchphrases becoming part of the popular culture. It was followed by three sequels in 1992, 1993 and 2009. In 1988, he made another Dumas adaptation – The Prisoner of Château d'If based on The Count of Monte Cristo novel. The screenplay was co-written by Mark Zakharov, while all the songs were written and performed by Alexander Gradsky.

Among his other notable works was another musical Ah, Vaudeville, Vaudeville... and the comedy The Art of Living in Odessa based on The Odessa Tales by Isaac Babel. He rarely turned to cinema during the post-Soviet years. In 1997, he joined Yuri Kuklachev at the National Cats Theater in Moscow as a stage director and scriptwriter. He also worked as a set designer in various theaters. His last film in the Musketeer series directed in 2007 and screened in 2009 was met with harsh critique and became a box office bomb.

Yungvald-Khilkevich died from the heart failure at the age of 81. He was buried at the Troyekurovskoye Cemetery in Moscow. He was survived by his third wife, an actress Nadira Mirzaeva (born 1969), and two daughters — Natalia (born 1960) and Nina (born 1997).

== Selected filmography ==
Year	English Title	Original Title	Notes
1966	The Formula of Rainbow	Формула радуги	Director
1969	Dangerous Tour	Опасные гастроли	Director
1969	Attention, a Tsunami!	Внимание, цунами!	Director, actor (episode)
1971	Insolence	Дерзость	Director
1978	D'Artagnan and Three Musketeers	Д’Артаньян и три мушкетёра	Director, actor (episode)
1979	Ah, Vaudeville, Vaudeville...	Ах, водевиль, водевиль...	Director, screenwriter
1986	Higher Than Rainbow	Выше радуги	Director, screenwriter
1988	The Prisoner of Château d'If	Узник замка Иф	Director, screenwriter, actor
1989	The Art of Living in Odessa	Искусство жить в Одессе	Director, screenwriter
1992	Musketeers Twenty Years After	Мушкетёры двадцать лет спустя	Director, producer, screenwriter
1993	The Secret of Queen Anne or Musketeers Thirty Years After	Тайна королевы Анны, или Мушкетёры тридцать лет спустя	Director, producer, screenwriter
2003	A New Year Romance	Новогодний романс	Director, actor
2009	The Return of the Musketeers, or The Treasures of Cardinal Mazarin	Возвращение мушкетёров, или Сокровища кардинала Мазарини	Director, screenwriter, actor

== Bibliography ==
- Georgi Yungvald-Khilkevich, Natalia Yungvald-Khilkevich. За кадром (eng. Behind the Screen). Moscow: Цетрополиграф, 2000 (Autobiography). ISBN 5-227-00627-X
