= The Return of the Musketeers, or The Treasures of Cardinal Mazarin =

- Theatrical poster
- Directed by: Georgi Yungvald-Khilkevich
- Written by: Alexandre Dumas; Georgi Yungvald-Khilkevich; Anton Markov; Yuri Blikov
- Produced by: Oleg Chamin; Veronika Rozhkova
- Starring: Mikhail Boyarsky; Veniamin Smekhov; Igor Starygin; Valentin Smirnitsky
- Cinematography: Sergei Tartyshnikov
- Edited by: Tamara Prokopenko
- Music by: Maksim Dunayevsky
- Distributed by: New One Production
- Release date: 4 February 2009
- Running time: 110 min.
- Country: Russia
- Language: Russian
- Budget: US$7,000,000

The Return of the Musketeers, or The Treasures of Cardinal Mazarin (Russian: Возвращение мушкетёров, или Сокровища кардинала Мазарини, romanized: Vozvrashchenie mushketyorov, ili Sokrovishcha kardinala Mazarini) is a 2009 Russian musical comedy film with fantasy elements, directed by Georgi Yungvald-Khilkevich, featuring characters from The d'Artagnan Romances of Alexandre Dumas.

The film begins with the deaths of Aramis and Porthos in a fight, the suicide of Athos, and the death of d'Artagnan during the Siege of Maastricht (1673). Anne of Austria, Dowager Queen of France, has just lost her honor's defenders, while facing a political crisis. In need to find replacements for her deceased agents, Anne recruits the sons and daughters of the dead musketeers for a mission. When the original agents (and one of their foes) receive a temporary resurrection, they join their kids in the service of the queen.

== Plot ==
The film begins with the final scene of The Vicomte of Bragelonne: Ten Years Later, an 1847-1850 novel by Alexandre Dumas. The musketeers Aramis and Porthos are killed in a fight against royal guardsmen. After sensing their deaths, Athos commits suicide by poisoning himself in his own estate. While serving in the Franco-Dutch War as commander of the royal troops, d'Artagnan eventually becomes a Marshal of France as it was predicted by Athos at the Siege of La Rochelle, but is killed by a cannonball at the Siege of Maastricht after barely getting the cherished baton. The friends, who had hitherto been invincible and inseparable, suddenly die in one day.

At this point, a total muddle reigns inside France. In the Parliament, fierce debates rage over the stealing from the treasury, for which Cardinal Mazarin, who secretly left France with the royal treasure, is truly responsible. Yet, the Parliament and the people find Queen Anne of Austria, a lover of Mazarin, guilty. As her honor's defenders are no longer alive, the queen feels an urgent need to find new ones. Those are the musketeers' children—Jacqueline the daughter of d'Artagnan, Raoul the son of Athos, Henri the son of Aramis, and Angelica the daughter of Porthos. The captain of the Royal Guards, Leon, initially stands against the formed quartet, until he finds out he is the son of Porthos.

After the death of Cardinal Mazarin in England, his treasure passes to the Society of Jesus along with the Templar Ring that grants immortality in accordance with the legends. When the young heroes try to take back the wealth belonging to France and its queen, they are taken prisoner, while Raoul is killed in an unequal skirmish. The souls of their fathers excitedly and powerlessly observe their children's adventures before a sincere prayer by d'Artagnan returns them to earth, giving a chance to save the descendants and the queen's honor. The sworn enemy of d'Artagnan, the guardsman de Jussac, revives along with them and also seeks the treasure.

As a result, the children are back together with their parents, the treacherous Jesuits are defeated and the queen's honor has finally been retained.

== Cast ==
- Mikhail Boyarsky as d'Artagnan
- Veniamin Smekhov as Athos
- Igor Starygin as Aramis (voice Igor Yasulovich)
- Valentin Smirnitsky as Porthos
- Alisa Freindlich as Anne of Austria
- Dmitry Kharatyan as King Louis XIV
- Aleksandr Shirvindt as Colbert
- Lyanka Gryu as Jacqueline, daughter of d'Artagnan
- Evgeniya Kryukova as Louise de La Vallière
- Danila Dunayev as Raoul, son of Athos
- Irina Pegova as Angelica, daughter of Porthos
- Dmitry Nagiyev as Leon, son of Porthos
- Anton Makarsky as Henri, son of Aramis
- Anatoly Ravikovitch as Cardinal Mazarin
- Vladimir Balon as de Jussac
- Vitaly Alshansky as Germain

== Production ==
Initial filming began on 15 June 2007 in the Ukrainian village of Fontanka, situated in the close proximity to the Black Sea. Filming later took place in Odesa, Bilhorod-Dnistrovskyi, Lviv, Svirzh, Moscow and Saint Peterburg. The production involved about 1,200 people, including extras.

== Release ==
The Return of the Musketeers premiered at the Oktyabr Cinema in Moscow on 4 February 2009. A longer director's cut version was broadcast on Channel One on 4 November 2009.

== Reception ==
The film received mostly negative reviews. It holds 2.7 out of 10 at KinoPoisk. The film critic Alex Exler noted that the film looks like a parody on the previous Musketeers films and is "so miserable and awful that it is even worth watching—such an explosion of brains is rarely seen".

== Other media ==
The movie has received a tie-in video game adaptation published by Akella, released on PC on February 13, 2009.
