= Dangerous Tour (film) =

- Directed by: Georgi Yungvald-Khilkevich
- Written by: Mikhail Melkumov
- Produced by: Sergey Tsyvilko
- Starring: Vladimir Vysotsky; Yefim Kopelyan; Nikolai Grinko; Ivan Pereverzev; Georgi Yumatov
- Cinematography: Fedor Silchenko
- Music by: Oleksandr Bilash
- Production company: Odessa Film Studio
- Release date: 1969
- Running time: 87 min
- Country: Soviet Union
- Language: Russian

Dangerous Tour (Russian: Опасные гастроли, romanized: Opasnye gastroli) is a 1969 Soviet historical musical film directed by Georgi Yungvald-Khilkevich. The film is set in Odessa in the year 1910. A local cabaret theatre is operating as a front organization for the Bolsheviks.

== Plot ==
The setting of the film is Odessa in the year 1910. A certain Frenchman, Viscount de Cordelia, with the permission of the governor and the "fathers" of the town organizes a cabaret theater. The entertainers who perform there include the singer Bengalsky, a charming dancer, a gypsy duet and of course also a corps de ballet.

However it turns out that this place was created by the Bolsheviks. It is a front for the work of a whole group of underground revolutionaries who are under the nose of the enemy with the theater serving as a cover.

== Cast ==
- Vladimir Vysotsky as George Bengalsky (Nikolay Kovalenko)
- Yefim Kopelyan as Ivan Tarielovich Bobruisky-Dumbadze, police chief
- Nikolai Grinko as Andrey Maksimovic (Viscount de Cordelia)
- Ivan Pereverzev as Kazimierz Kazimirovich Kulbras, Governor General
- Georgi Yumatov as Maksim
- Kira Muratova as Nina
- Borislav Brondukov as watchman
- S. Krupnin as Ali Baba
- Viktor Pavlovsky
- Vladimir Gulyaev
- Valentin Kulik

== Production ==
Although the film was shot in Odessa and the suburbs, some background shots were shot in Leningrad.
