= Valentin Smirnitsky =

Soviet and Russian actor

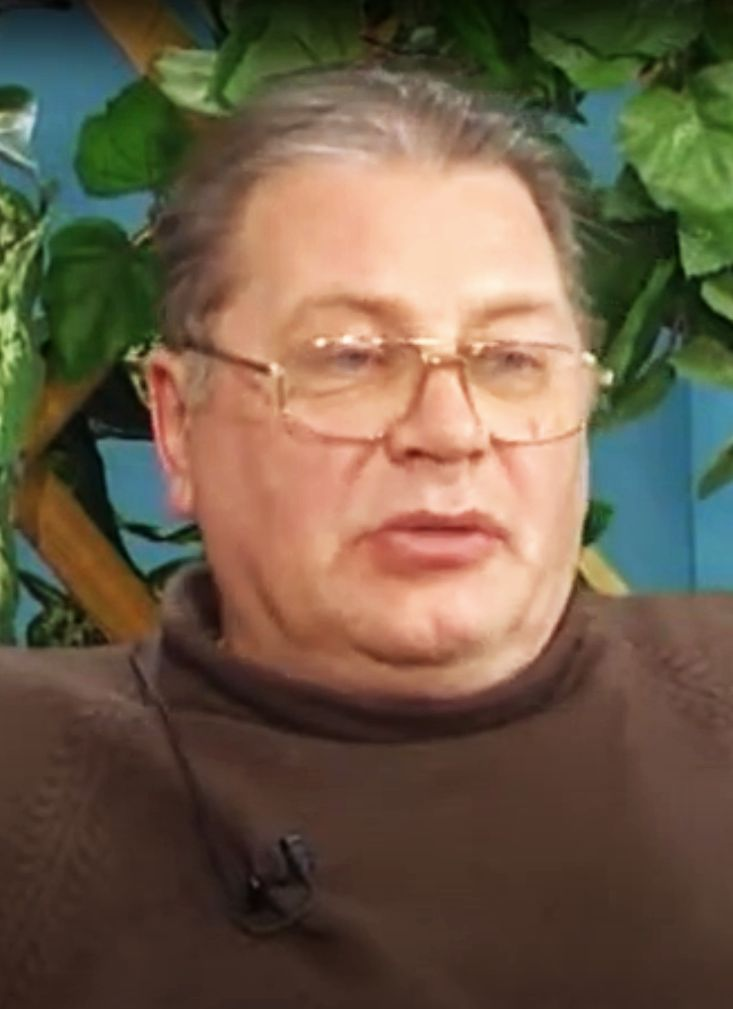
- Born: Valentin Georgievich Smirtinsky; 10 June 1944 (age 81); Moscow, Soviet Union
- Occupation: Actor
- Years active: 1963 — present
- Spouse: Lydia Ryabtseva

Valentin Georgievich Smirtinsky (Russian: Валентин Георгиевич Смирнитский; born 10 June 1944 in Moscow) is a Soviet and Russian stage and film actor. People's Artist of Russia (2005).

== Filmography ==
- Walking the Streets of Moscow (Я шагаю по Москве, 1963) as episode (uncredited)
- Seven Old Men and a Girl (Семь стариков и одна девушка, 1968) as Vladimir Tyupin
- D'Artagnan and Three Musketeers (д'Артаньян и три мушкетёра, 1978) as Porthos
- Visit to Minotaur (Визит к Минотавру, 1987) as Aleksandr Sadomsky
- Entrance to the Labyrinth (Вход в лабиринт, 1989) as Yakov Okun
- Musketeers Twenty Years After (Мушкетёры двадцать лет спустя, 1992) as Porthos
- The Secret of Queen Anne or Musketeers Thirty Years After (Тайна королевы Анны, или Мушкетёры тридцать лет спустя, 1993) as Porthos
- The Master and Margarita (miniseries) (Мастер и Маргарита, 2005) as Arkady Apollonovich Sempleyarov
- The Return of the Musketeers, or The Treasures of Cardinal Mazarin (Возвращение мушкетёров, или Сокровища кардинала Мазарини, 2009) as Porthos
- The Pregnant (Беременный, 2011) as Sergei's father
- Brief Guide To A Happy Life (Краткий курс счастливой жизни, 2012) as Ilya Ilyich
- The 101-Year-Old Man Who Skipped Out on the Bill and Disappeared (2016) as Leonid Brezhnev
- The Execution (Казнь, 2021) as General
