= The Three Musketeers (1973 live-action film) =

Swashbuckler film by Richard Lester

- Theatrical release poster
- Directed by: Richard Lester
- Written by: George MacDonald Fraser
- Based on: The Three Musketeers; 1844 novel by Alexandre Dumas père
- Produced by: Ilya Salkind
- Starring: Oliver Reed; Raquel Welch; Richard Chamberlain; Michael York; Frank Finlay; Christopher Lee; Geraldine Chaplin; Simon Ward; Faye Dunaway; Charlton Heston
- Cinematography: David Watkin
- Edited by: John Victor Smith
- Music by: Michel Legrand
- Production company: Film Trust S.A.
- Distributed by: 20th Century Fox
- Release dates: 11 December 1973 (France); 26 March 1974 (United Kingdom); 29 March 1974 (United States)
- Running time: 105 minutes
- Countries: United Kingdom; United States
- Language: English
- Budget: $4.5 million
- Box office: $10.1 million (rentals)

The Three Musketeers (also known as The Three Musketeers (The Queen's Diamonds)) is a 1973 swashbuckler film based on the 1844 novel by Alexandre Dumas. It is directed by Richard Lester from a screenplay by George MacDonald Fraser, and produced by Ilya Salkind. It stars Michael York, Oliver Reed, Frank Finlay, and Richard Chamberlain as the musketeers, with Raquel Welch, Geraldine Chaplin, Jean-Pierre Cassel, Charlton Heston, Faye Dunaway, Christopher Lee, Simon Ward, Georges Wilson and Spike Milligan.

The film adheres closely to the novel, and also injects a fair amount of humor. It was proposed in the 1960s as a vehicle for the Beatles, whom Lester had directed in A Hard Day's Night (1964) and Help! (1965). It was shot by David Watkin, with an eye for period detail, in Madrid and Segovia, Spain. The fight scenes were choreographed by master swordsman William Hobbs. The musical score was composed by Michel Legrand.

The Three Musketeers premiered in France on 11 December 1973. It was both a critical and commercial success and was nominated for several awards, including five BAFTAs. Raquel Welch won a Golden Globe for her performance. The Four Musketeers (1974), a sequel shot back-to-back with its predecessor, was released.

== Plot ==
Having learned swordsmanship from his father, the young country bumpkin d'Artagnan arrives in Paris with dreams of becoming a King's Musketeer. Unaccustomed to the city life, he makes a number of clumsy faux pas. First he finds himself insulted, knocked out and robbed by the Comte de Rochefort, an agent of Cardinal Richelieu, and once in Paris comes into conflict with three musketeers, Athos, Porthos, and Aramis, each of whom challenges him to a duel for some accidental insult or embarrassment. As the first of these duels is about to begin, Jussac arrives with five additional swordsmen of Cardinal Richelieu's guards. In the ensuing fight, d'Artagnan sides with the musketeers and becomes their ally in opposition to the cardinal, who wishes to increase his considerable power over King Louis XIII. D'Artagnan also begins an affair with his landlord's wife, Constance Bonacieux, who is dressmaker to Queen Anne of Austria.

Meanwhile, the Duke of Buckingham, former lover of the queen, turns up and asks for something in remembrance of her; she gives him a necklace with 12 settings of diamonds, a gift from her husband. From the queen's treacherous lady-in-waiting, the cardinal learns of the rendezvous and suggests to the none-too-bright king to throw a ball in his wife's honor and request she wear the diamonds he gave her. The cardinal also sends his agent Milady de Winter to England, who seduces the duke and steals two of the necklace's diamonds.

Meanwhile, the queen has confided her troubles in Constance, who asks d'Artagnan to go to England and retrieve the diamonds. D'Artagnan and the three musketeers set out, but on the way, the cardinal's men attack them. Only d'Artagnan and his servant make it through to Buckingham, where they discover the loss of two of the diamond settings. The duke replaces the two settings, and d'Artagnan races back to Paris. Porthos, Athos, and Aramis, wounded but not dead as d'Artagnan had feared, aid the delivery of the complete necklace to the queen, saving the royal couple from the embarrassment which the cardinal and Milady de Winter had plotted.

Inducted, to Constance's delight, into the Musketeers of the King's Guard, d'Artagnan exchanges meaningful looks with Milady de Winter.

== Cast ==
- Oliver Reed as Athos
- Raquel Welch as Constance Bonacieux
- Richard Chamberlain as Aramis
- Michael York as D'Artagnan
- Frank Finlay as Porthos / O'Reilly
- Christopher Lee as the Count De Rochefort
- Geraldine Chaplin as Anne of Austria
- Jean-Pierre Cassel as King Louis XIII (dubbed by Richard Briers)
- Spike Milligan as Monsieur Bonacieux
- Roy Kinnear as Planchet
- Georges Wilson as Captain de Tréville (dubbed by Michael Hordern)
- Simon Ward as the Duke of Buckingham
- Faye Dunaway as Milady de Winter
- Charlton Heston as Cardinal Richelieu
- Joss Ackland as D'Artagnan's Father
- Nicole Calfan as Kitty
- Michael Gothard as John Felton
- Sybil Danning as Eugenie
- Gitty Djamal as Beatrice
- Ángel del Pozo as Jussac
- Rodney Bewes as Spy
- Ben Aris as 1st Musketeer
- Gretchen Franklin as D'Artagnan's Mother
- Francis de Wolff as Sea Captain

== Production ==
=== Development ===
According to George MacDonald Fraser, Richard Lester became involved with the project when the producers, the Salkinds (Alexander and Ilya), briefly considered casting the Beatles as the Musketeers, as Lester had directed A Hard Day's Night (1964) and Help! (1965). The Beatles idea fell by the wayside but Lester stayed. Lester says he had "never heard of" the Salkinds when they asked him if he was interested in doing The Three Musketeers. He read "the first 200 pages, got excited and said yes".

It was Lester's first feature film in five years, but he had directed commercials and had sought finance for other projects, including an adaptation of the novel Flashman by George MacDonald Fraser.

Lester said the producers "wanted it to be a sexy film and they wanted it to be with big sexy stars" such as Leonard Whiting and Ursula Andress. He said "I just didn't say no to anything in the early stages" and that the "die was cast" when he was allowed to hire George MacDonald Fraser to write the script.

Fraser had never written a script but Lester thought that Flashman had the tone he was going for with his version of The Three Musketeers and the author was offered the job of writing the screenplay in late 1972.

According to Fraser, Lester originally said he wanted to make a four-hour film and cast Richard Chamberlain as Aramis, which Fraser felt gave him a strong idea of the tone Lester was looking for. It was later decided to turn the script into two films. Fraser says he wrote them as two films, but no one told the actors.

Lester says Fraser wrote the scripts in five weeks, and they were "perfect... just wonderful." "It's the journalism training," said Fraser.

=== Casting ===
Lester says the Salkinds left him alone creatively for most of the film apart from insisting that Raquel Welch and Simon Ward be cast. "Raquel is very big in all the small countries," said Ilya Salkind.

In April 1973 Charlton Heston wrote in his journal that he had been offered the role of Athos. "It's a good script, very funny, but not a parody. Why do they want to spend as much as they have to pay me to play Athos? It's not that good a part; nothing like the brilliant kind of key cameo role actors look for, as with Olivier in Khartoum." Lester called Heston to discuss it but Heston was unsure. He wrote, "If they plan to cast the whole film at this level, their above-the-line costs will reach astronomical heights. I still don't see playing Athos, standing around in Spain all summer with nothing to do. I suggested to Lester the possibility of my doing a bit, for fun, but it all looks a little unlikely." Lester then suggested Heston play Richelieu - which the actor called "a part so far outside my usual range that it hadn't even occurred to me". When the director promised Heston all his scenes could be shot in ten days, Heston agreed.

"I did the picture because of Dick Lester," Charlton Heston told the press.

In August 1973 Welch withdrew from the film due to creative and artistic differences. She announced she instead would make the film Decline and Fall of a Very Nice Lady. However, Welch rejoined the film.

=== Filming ===
The film was meant to be shot in Hungary. However, after visiting the country, Lester felt this would not be feasible, in part because of restrictions of the government on filming.

The movie was shot in Spain over seventeen weeks. Locations included Segovia, where Lester had made A Funny Thing Happened on the Way to the Forum (1966), Aranjuez, Toledo and Madrid.

Lester says the producers assembled 20 minutes of footage and sold the film to 20th Century Fox.

Lester says Michel Legrand "had about a week and a half" to write the music.

== Reception ==
=== Critical response ===
On Rotten Tomatoes, the film has an approval rating of 90% based on reviews from 20 critics.

Variety gave the film a positive review, and wrote, "The Three Musketeers take very well to Richard Lester's provocative version that does not send it up but does add comedy to this adventure tale." They praised the various performances, but noted that although Dunaway is underused she gets to make up for it in the sequel.

Vincent Canby of The New York Times observed, "Mr. Lester seems almost exclusively concerned with action, preferably comic, and one gets the impression after a while that he and his fencing masters labored too long in choreographing the elaborate duels. They're interesting to watch, though they are without a great deal of spontaneity."

=== Awards and nominations ===
Award	Category	Nominee(s)	Result	Ref.
British Academy Film Awards	Best Art Direction	Brian Eatwell	Nominated	
British Academy Film Awards	Best Cinematography	David Watkin	Nominated	
British Academy Film Awards	Best Costume Design	Yvonne Blake	Nominated	
British Academy Film Awards	Best Film Editing	John Victor Smith	Nominated	
British Academy Film Awards	Best Original Music	Michel Legrand	Nominated	
Evening Standard British Film Awards	Best Comedy	Richard Lester	Won	
Golden Globe Awards	Best Motion Picture – Musical or Comedy		Nominated	
Golden Globe Awards	Best Actress in a Motion Picture – Musical or Comedy	Raquel Welch	Won	
Grammy Awards	Album of Best Original Score Written for a Motion Picture or a Television Special	Michel Legrand	Nominated	
National Board of Review Awards	Top Ten Films		10th Place	
Writers' Guild of Great Britain Awards	Best British Comedy Screenplay	George MacDonald Fraser	Won	

== Salkind clause ==
The film was intended to be an epic that ran for three hours, including an intermission, but during production, it was determined the film could not make its announced release date in that form, so a decision was made to split the longer film into two shorter features, the second part becoming 1974's The Four Musketeers.

Some actors knew of this decision earlier than others, and by the time of the Paris premiere, all had been informed. Screenwriter George MacDonald Fraser records the evening: "That not all the actors knew about this I didn't discover until the Paris premiere, which began with a dinner for the company at Fouquet's and concluded in the small hours with a deafening concert in what appeared to be the cellar of some ancient Parisian structure (the Hotel de Ville, I think). Charlton Heston knew, for when we discussed it before dinner he shrugged philosophically and remarked: 'Two for the price of one.'" This change incensed the actors and crew because they were being paid for one film, and their original contracts made no mention of a second feature, resulting in lawsuits being filed to receive compensation for salaries associated with the sequel.

This led to the Screen Actors Guild requiring all future actors' contracts to include what has become known as the "Salkind clause" (named after producers Alexander and Ilya Salkind), which stipulates that single productions cannot be split into film installments without prior contractual agreement.

== Releases ==
The original negatives by StudioCanal were used to master The Criterion Collection's new 4K Blu-ray restoration, although Criterion chose to retain the mono soundtrack, rather than a multi-channel remix.

== Sequels ==
The Four Musketeers was released the following year, with footage intended to combine with this film's to be part of a much longer film.

In 1989, much of the cast and crew of the original returned to film The Return of the Musketeers, loosely based on Dumas' 1845 novel Twenty Years After.
