= Alisa Freindlich =

Russian actress (born 1934)

- Алиса Фрейндлих
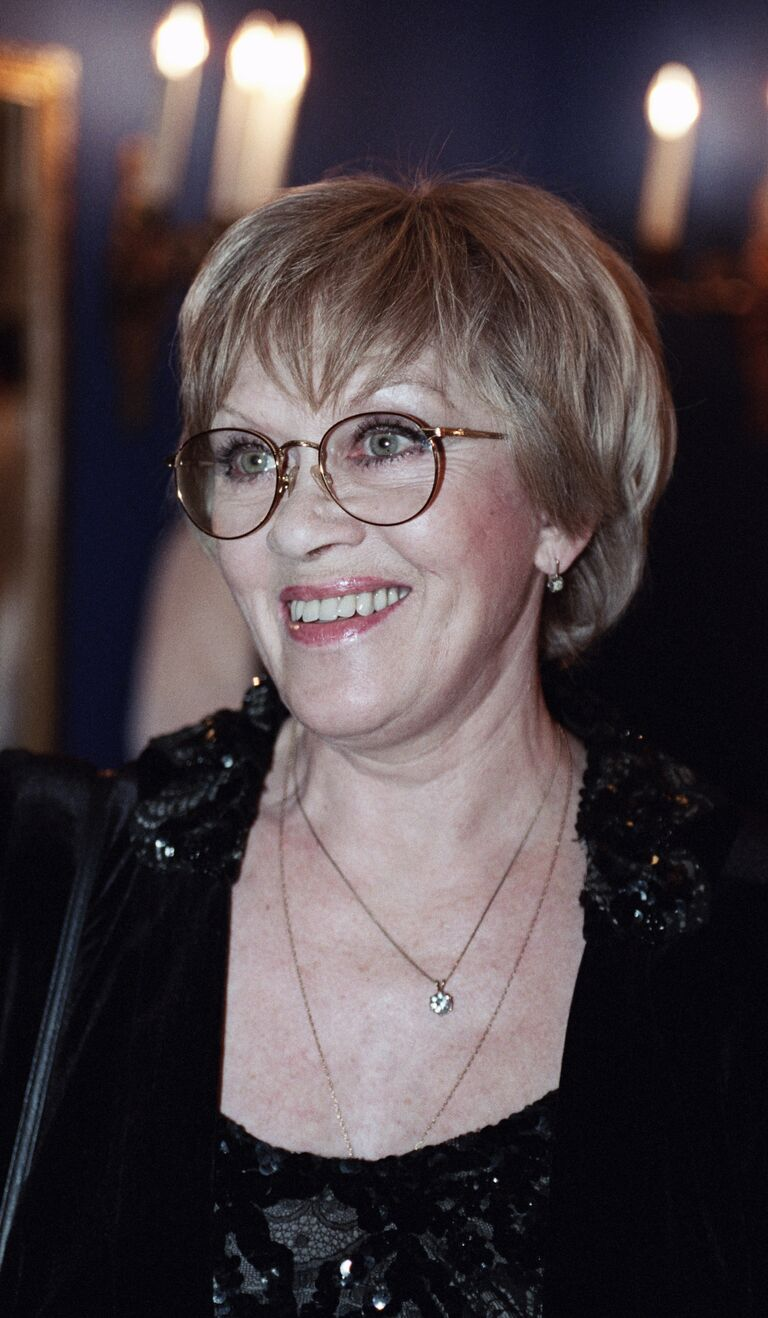
- Freindlich in 2002
- Born: Alisa Brunovna Freindlich; December 8, 1934 (age 91); Leningrad, Russian SFSR, Soviet Union
- Occupation: Actress
- Years active: 1955–present
- Children: Varvara Vladimirova
- Parent(s): Bruno Freindlich, Ksenia Fedorova
- Awards

Alisa Brunovna Freindlich (Note: Russian: Алиса Бруновна Фрейндлих, romanized: Alisa Brunovna Freyndlikh, sometimes given as Freindlih; German: Alissa Brunowna Freindlich) (born 8 December 1934) is a Russian actress. Since 1983, Freindlich has been a leading actress of the Bolshoi Drama Theater in Saint Petersburg, Russia. She was awarded the title of the People's Artist of the USSR in 1981.

== Biography ==
Alisa Freindlich was born into the family of Bruno Freindlich, a prominent actor and People's Artist of the USSR. She is of German and Russian ancestry. Her father and paternal relatives were ethnic Germans living in Russia for more than a century. In her childhood years, Freindlich attended the drama and music classes of the Leningrad Palace of Pioneers. During World War II, she survived the 900-day-long Nazi siege of Leningrad and continued her school studies after the war.

In the 1950s, Freindlich studied acting at the Leningrad State Institute of Theatre, Music and Cinema, graduating in 1957 as an actress. From 1957 to 1961, she was a member of the troupe at Komissarzhevskaya Theatre in Leningrad. Then she joined the Lensovet Theatre company, but in 1982, she had to leave it following her divorce from the theatre's director, Igor Vladimirov. Thereupon, director Georgy Tovstonogov invited her to join the troupe of the Bolshoi Drama Theater.

Although Freindlich put a premium on her stage career, she starred in several notable movies, including Eldar Ryazanov's enormously popular comedy Office Romance (1977), the long-banned epic Agony (1975) and Andrei Tarkovsky's sci-fi movie Stalker (1979). Another notable role was Queen Anne of Austria in the Soviet TV series D'Artagnan and Three Musketeers (1978) and its later Russian sequels, Musketeers Twenty Years After (1992) and The Secret of Queen Anne or Musketeers Thirty Years After (1993).

In 1999, Igor Vladimirov, Freindlich's second husband, died after a long illness, and three years later, her father, Bruno Arturovich, also died.

=== 2000–present ===
On her 70th birthday, she was visited by Vladimir Putin in her Saint Petersburg apartment, who awarded her with the State Prize of the Russian Federation. She also received a Nika Award in 2005.

In the 2004 film, Freindlich starred in On Upper Maslovka Street after a 10-year hiatus. Her partner on the set was the young actor Yevgeny Mironov. She starred as 87-year-old sculptor Anna Borisovna, who lives out her life in an old workshop.

Despite the mixed reception of the film by film critics, Freindlich's acting was highly praised by journalists and critics. Yeaterina Tarkhanova, a columnist for film.ru, noted that she "performs the "old woman sketch" absolutely flawlessly: plastically, facially, intonation." Igor Mikhailov from kino.ru said:

She plays the inability to walk, breathe, and sometimes speak. In the last frames she plays the transition to death. But the key word in "woman over ninety" is WOMAN. She plays the ability to love, charm, despise, forgive, TRY TO HELP A MAN BE A MAN... Always, under any trials and circumstances. And the viewer lives with Alisa, loves with Alisa, laughs with Alisa, and dies with Alisa.

For this role, Freindlich was awarded her second Nika Award for Best Actress.

In 2009, Freindlich starred in Room and a Half, which won a Nika Award. She starred as the mother of the poet Joseph Brodsky.

On 7 December 2009, on the stage of the Great Hall of the Central House of Actors named after Yablochkina, the Theatrical Star 2009 award ceremony was held. Freindlich was nominated "For Best Improvisation" for her role as Madeleine in Lessons of Tango and Love.

On 5 December 2014, in honor of Friendlich's 80th anniversary, an exhibition dedicated to the history of her family, titled Theater Dynasties of Freindlich, was opened in St. Petersburg at the Museum-Apartment of Samoilov Actors, Stremyannaya, 8.

As of 2019, Freindlich was performing in nine productions of the Bolshoi Drama in Saint Petersburg, where she is a leading actress.

== Personal life ==
Freindlich is a member of the United Russia party.

== Selected filmography ==
- Unfinished Story (1955) as episode
- Talents and Admirers (1956) as episode
- Immortal Song (1957) as gymnasium student
- The City Turns the Lights On (1958) as Zina Pichikova
- The Story Of Newlyweds (1960) as Galya
- Striped Trip (1961) as barmaid
- Fro (1964) as Natasha Bukova
- The First Visitor (1965) as Tanya
- Adventures of a Dentist (1965) as Masha
- The City and the Song (1968) as singer
- To Love (1968) as Anya
- The Waltz (1969, TV Movie) as Marusya
- Yesterday, Today and Forever (1969) as defendant's wife
- Family Happiness (1970) as Anna Semyonovna Kapitonova
- The Secret of the Iron Door (1970) as Lyusa Ryzhkova, Tolik's mother
- My Life (1973) as Kleopatra Polozneva
- Acting As (1973) as Yevgenia Sinegrach
- Melodies of Vera Quarter (1973) as Alisa Akvamarinskaya
- The Taming of the Shrew (1973, TV Movie) as Katherina
- Anna and Commodore (1974) as Anna
- The Straw Hat (1974, TV Mini-Series) as Baroness de Champigny
- Blue Puppy (1976, Cartoon) as Blue Puppy (singing voice)
- Always with Me... (1976) as Tanya Ilyina
- The Princess and the Pea (1977) as Queen Mother
- Office Romance (1977) as Lyudmila Prokofyevna Kalugina
- Old-Fashioned Comedy (1978) as Lydia Vasilievna Zherber
- Stalker (1979) as Stalker's wife
- D'Artagnan and Three Musketeers (1979, TV Mini-Series) as Anne of Austria Queen
- Sergey Ivanovich Retires (1980) as Natasha
- Three Years (1980) as Polina Rassudina
- Dangerous Age (1981) | Lilia Ivanovna Rodimtseva
- Two Voices (1981) as Yekaterina
- Agony (1981) as Anna Alexandrovna Vyrubova
- A Canary Cage (1983) as Olesya's mother
- A Cruel Romance (1984) as Harita Ignatievna Ogudalova
- Success (1985) as Zinaida Nikolayevna Arsenyeva
- A Simple Death (1985) as Praskovya Fedorovna
- Forgive Me (1986) as Elizaveta Andreyevna
- The Secret of the Snow Queen (1986) as Snow Queen
- Chekharda (1987) as Margarita Vasilievna Kudryavtseva, accompanist and second conductor
- Weekdays and Holidays of Serafima Glukina (1988) as Serafima Glukina
- Musketeers Twenty Years After (1992, TV Mini-Series) as Queen Anne of Austria
- The Secret of Queen Anne or Musketeers Thirty Years After (1994) as Queen Anne of Austria
- Katya Ismailova (1994) as Irina Dmitrievna
- Women's Logic (2003-2006) as Olga Petrovna Tumanova
- On Upper Maslovka Street (2005) as Anna Borisovna
- A Room and a Half (2009) as Brodsky's mother
- The Return of the Musketeers, or The Treasures of Cardinal Mazarin (2009) as Queen Anne of Austria
- Bolshoi (2017) as Galina Beletskaya
- Thawed Carp (2017) as Lyudmila Borisovna
- Parents of the Strict Regime (2022) as mother

== Honors and awards ==
Honorary titles:

- Honored Artist of the RSFSR (1965)
- People's Artist of the RSFSR (1971)
- People's Artist of the USSR (1981)
- Honorary Member of the Russian Academy of Arts

State awards and incentives:

- RSFSR State Prize of Stanislavsky (1976) for the performance of roles Shchegoleva, Kovaleva, Kid plays in "The Man from", "Kovalev of the province," IH Butler, "The Kid and Carlson," by Astrid Lindgren
- State Prize of the Russian Federation in Literature and Art in 1995 (27 May 1996) for the outstanding performance of roles of the classical repertoire
- State Prize of the Russian Federation in Literature and Art in 2000 (6 June 2001) for the performance of the Russian State Academic Bolshoi Drama Theatre Tovstonogov "Arcadia" play by Tom Stoppard
- State Prize of the Russian Federation for year 2007 (19 May 2008) for creating artistic images that have become classics of domestic theatrical art and film
- Diploma of the President of the Russian Federation (8 December 2010) for a great contribution to the development of domestic theater and cinema art.

Orders:

- Order of the Red Banner of Labour (1986)
- Order of Friendship (17 December 1994) for services to the people associated with the development of Russian statehood, the achievements in labour, science, culture, arts, strengthening friendship and cooperation between nations

Order "For Merit to the Fatherland":

- 4th class (13 February 2004) for outstanding contribution to the development of domestic theatrical art.
- 3rd class (5 February 2009) for outstanding contribution to the development of domestic theatrical art and many years of fruitful activity.
- 2nd class (28 October 2019) for outstanding contribution to the development of domestic culture and arts and many years of fruitful activity.
- Order of Honour (25 September 2014)

Other awards, prizes, promotions and public recognition:

- Nika Award for Best Supporting Actress (movie "Moscow Nights", dir. Valeri Todorovski; 1994)
- Honorary citizen of St. Petersburg (2001)
- Nika Award for Best Actress (movie "In the Upper Maslovka", dir. Konstantin Khudyakov; 2005)
- "Golden Mask" Award for best dramatic actress ("Oscar and the Pink Lady", Lensovet Theatre; 2006)
- 2018: Golden Eagle Award, Best Supporting Actress in Thawed Carp
