= Thawed Carp =

- Russian: Карп отмороженный
- Directed by: Vladimir Kott
- Written by: Andrey Taratukhin; Dmitriy Lanchikhin
- Produced by: Nikita Vladimirov; Maria Averbakh; Telman Akavov
- Starring: Marina Neyolova; Alisa Freindlikh; Yevgeny Mironov; Anton Shpinkov; Tatyana Tuzova
- Cinematography: Mikhail Agranovich
- Edited by: Alexander Korolev; Olga Grinshpun; Vladimir Kott
- Music by: Ruslan Muratov
- Production company: MovieCluster
- Release date: November 7, 2017
- Running time: 101 min.
- Country: Russia
- Language: Russian

Thawed Carp (Russian: Карп отмороженный, romanized: Karp otmorozhennyy) is a 2017 Russian drama film directed by Vladimir Kott.

== Plot ==
The film tells the story of a retired teacher in a provincial village, Yelena Nikiforova, who is suddenly given a terminal diagnosis by her doctor. Not wishing to disturb her son who works as a life coach in the city, she sets about organising her own funeral. The carp of the title refers to a frozen carp she is given, but which on thawing out turns out to be still alive.

== Cast ==
- Marina Neyolova as Elena Nikiforova
- Alisa Freindlikh as Lyudmila
- Yevgeny Mironov as Oleg
- Anton Shpinkov as Pashka
- Tatyana Tuzova as Sveta
- Olga Kozhevnikova as Natasha
- Natalya Surkova as Dormeneyeva
- Tatyana Rasskazova as Faina Pavlovna
- Sergei Puskepalis as Anisimov
- Aleksandr Bashirov as Undertaker

== Awards ==
- 2017: Audience Award, Moscow International Film Festival
- 2018: Golden Eagle Award, Best Supporting Actress (Alisa Freindlich)
