= Charles de Batz de Castelmore d'Artagnan =

French captain of musketeers (1611–1673)

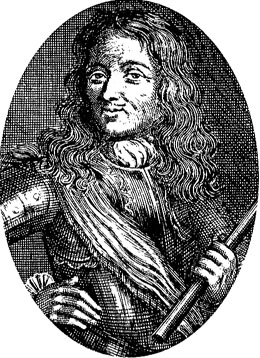
- Illustration from Courtilz de Sandras' novel Les mémoires de M. d'Artagnan.
- Born: c. 1611; Lupiac, Kingdom of France
- Died: 25 June 1673 (aged 61–62); Maastricht, Dutch Republic
- Spouse: Anne-Charlotte Boyer de Chanlecy
- Children: Louis de Batz de Castelmore (elder); Louis de Batz de Castelmore (junior)
- Military career
- Allegiance: Kingdom of France
- Branch: French Army
- Service years: 1632–1673
- Rank: Capitaine
- Unit: Gardes Françaises
- Commands: Musketeers of the Guard; Governor of Lille
- Conflicts: Franco-Spanish War (1635–1659); The Fronde; Franco-Dutch War; Siege of Maastricht †

5th Captain of the King's Musketeers
- In office 1667 – 25 June 1673
- Monarch: Louis XIV
- Chief Minister: Jean-Baptiste Colbert
- Secretary of State of the Maison du Roi (Note: Under the authority of Maison militaire du roi de France): Henri de Guénégaud; Jean-Baptiste Colbert
- Secretary of State for War: Michel le Tellier
- Preceded by: Philippe Jules Mancini
- Succeeded by: Louis de Forbin

Charles de Batz de Castelmore (French pronunciation: [ʃaʁl də bats də kastɛlmɔʁ]), also known as d'Artagnan and later Count d'Artagnan (c. 1611 – 25 June 1673), was a French soldier who served Louis XIV as captain of the Musketeers of the Guard. He died at the siege of Maastricht in the Franco-Dutch War. A fictionalised account of his life by Gatien de Courtilz de Sandras formed the basis for the d'Artagnan Romances of Alexandre Dumas, most famously including The Three Musketeers (1844). The heavily fictionalised version of d'Artagnan featured in Dumas' works and their subsequent screen adaptations is now far more widely known than the real historical figure.

== Early life ==
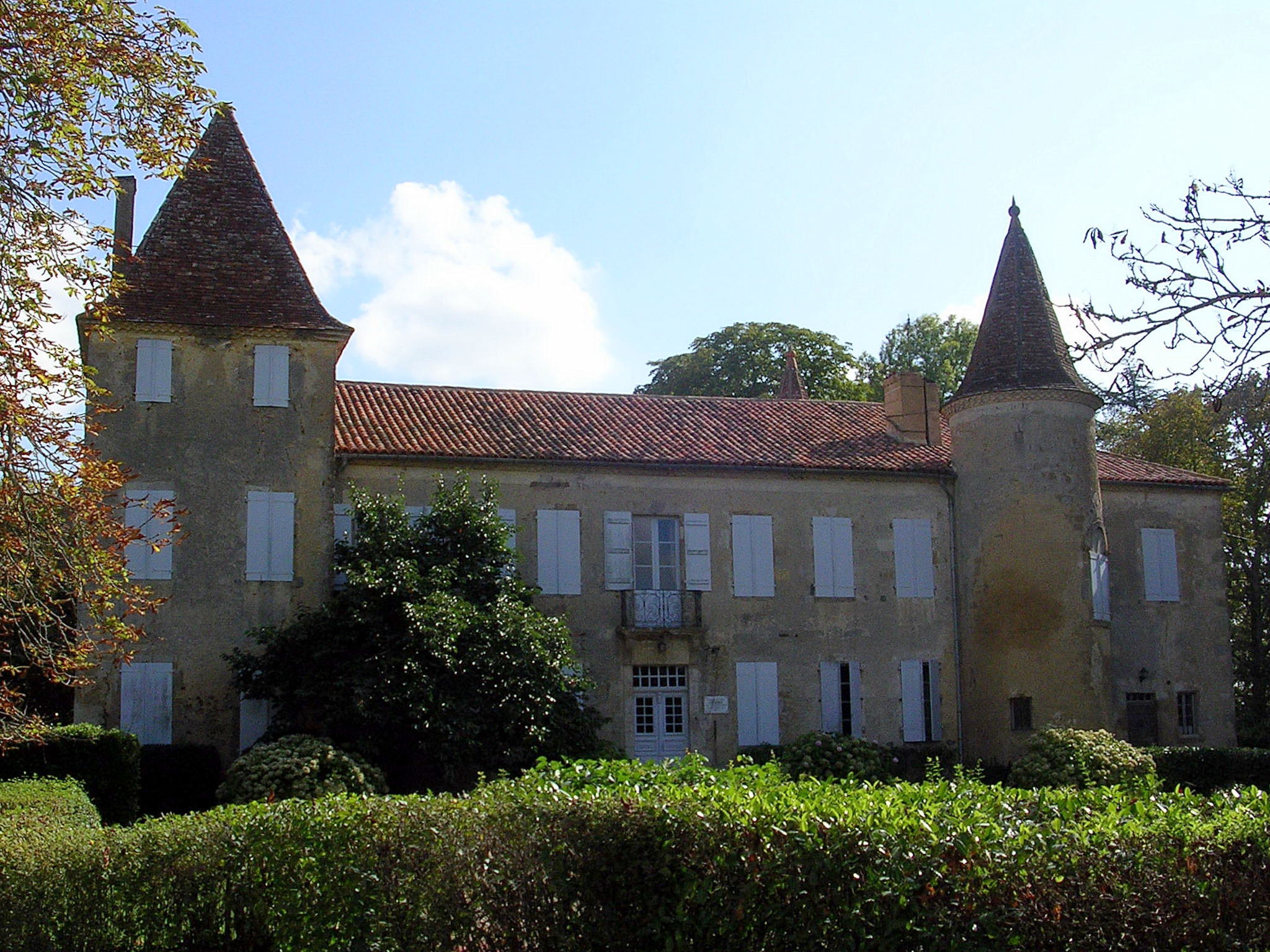
Château de Castelmore

D'Artagnan was born at the Château de Castelmore near Lupiac in south-western France. His father, Bertrand de Batz lord of Castelmore, was the son of a newly ennobled merchant, Arnaud de Batz, who purchased the Château de Castelmore. Charles de Batz went to Paris in the 1630s, using the name of his mother Françoise de Montesquiou d'Artagnan. D'Artagnan found a way to enter into the Musketeers in 1632 through the support of his uncle, Henri de Montesquiou d'Artagnan or perhaps thanks to the influence of Henri's friend, Monsieur de Tréville. D’Artagnan joined the guards in the mid-1630s and served under Captain des Essarts. The regiment saw much action in the early 1640s, taking part in sieges at Arras alongside another literary famous comrade in arms Cyrano de Bergerac, at Aire-sur-la-Lys, La Bassée and Bapaume in 1640–41 and Collioure and Perpignan in 1642. Whether or not d’Artagnan was personally involved is unclear, but it is likely he took part in some, if not all, of these sieges. While in the Musketeers, d'Artagnan sought the protection of the influential Cardinal Mazarin, France's principal minister from 1643. In 1646, the Musketeers company was dissolved, but d'Artagnan continued to serve his protector Mazarin.

== Career ==
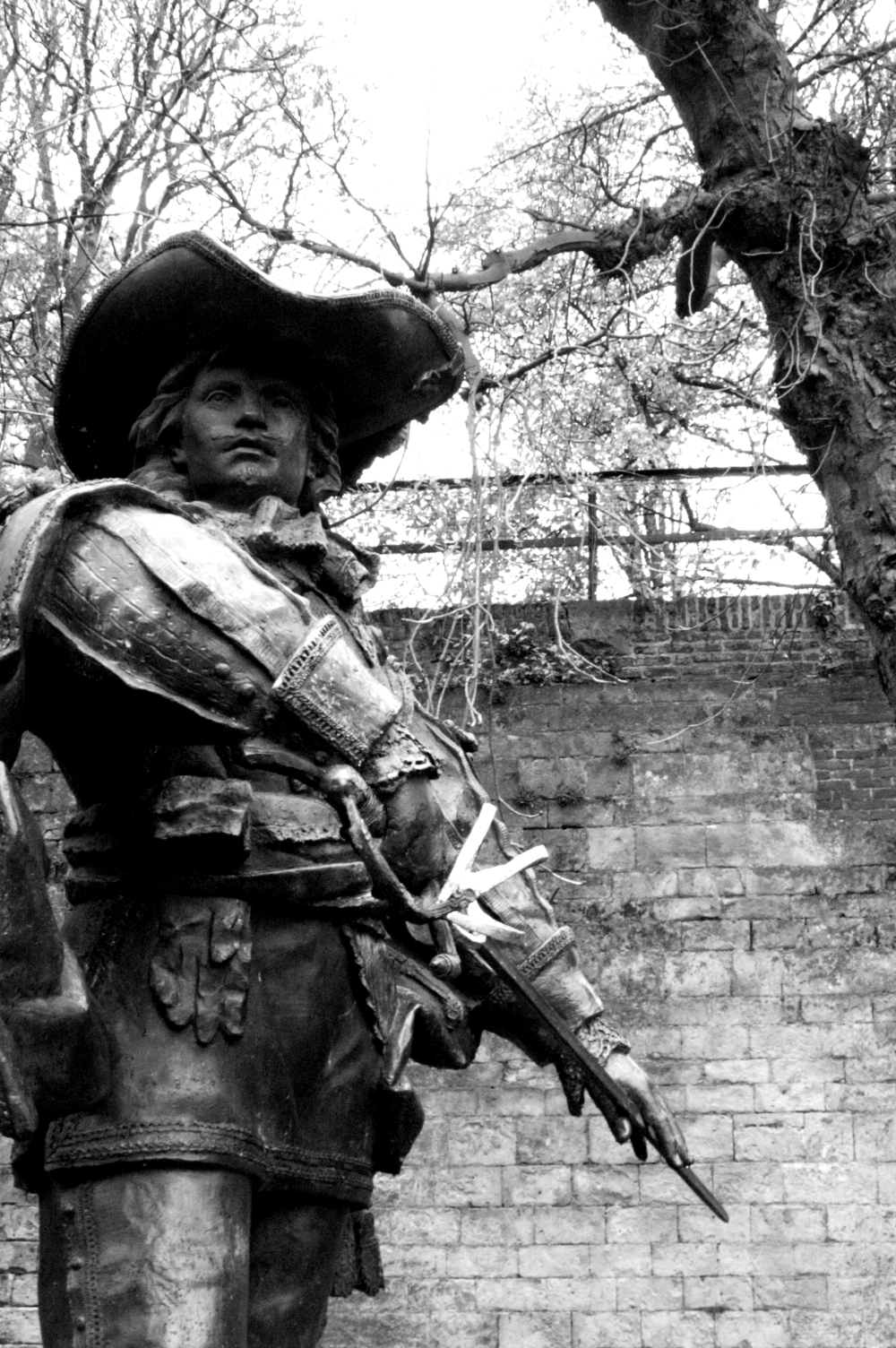
Statue of d'Artagnan in Maastricht

D'Artagnan had a career in espionage for Cardinal Mazarin, in the years after the first Fronde. Owing to d'Artagnan's faithful service during this period, Louis XIV entrusted him with many secret and delicate situations that required complete discretion. He followed Mazarin during his exile in 1651 in the face of the hostility of the aristocracy. In 1652, d'Artagnan was promoted to lieutenant in the Gardes Françaises, and fought at the Battle of Stenay in 1654, as well as in sieges at Landrecies and Saint-Ghislaine, then to captain in 1655. In 1658, he became a second lieutenant in the newly reformed Musketeers. This was a promotion, as the Musketeers were far more prestigious than the Gardes-Françaises.

D'Artagnan was famous for his connection with the arrest of Nicolas Fouquet. Fouquet was Louis XIV's finance commissioner and aspired to take the place of Mazarin as the king's advisor. Fouquet was also a lover of grand architecture and employed the greatest architects and artisans in the building of his Chateau of Vaux-le-Vicomte. On 17 August 1661, he celebrated the completion with a most extravagant feast, at which every guest was given a horse. The king, however, felt upstaged by the grandeur of the home and event and, suspecting that such magnificence could only be explained through Fouquet's pilfering the royal treasury, three weeks later had d'Artagnan arrest Fouquet. To prevent his escape by bribery, d'Artagnan was assigned to guard him for four years until Fouquet was sentenced to life imprisonment.

In 1667, d'Artagnan was promoted to captain-lieutenant of the Musketeers, the effective commander as the nominal captain was the king. As befitted his rank and position, he could be identified by his striking burgundy, white, and black livery—the colours of the commanding officer of the Musketeers. Another of d'Artagnan's assignments was the governorship of Lille, which was won in battle by France in 1667. D'Artagnan was an unpopular governor and longed to return to battle. He found his chance when Louis XIV went to war with the Dutch Republic in the Franco-Dutch War. After being recalled to service, d'Artagnan was killed in battle on 25 June 1673 at the siege of Maastricht, when some believe that a musket ball tore into his throat.

=== Location of remains ===
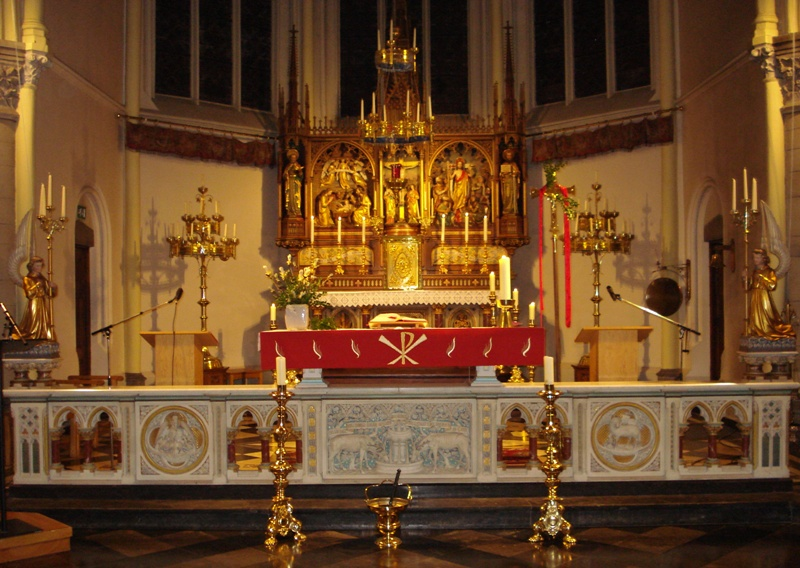
St Peter and Paul Church altar, where d’Artagnan may have been buried

The French historian Odile Bordaz believes that d'Artagnan was buried in St Peter and Paul Church in Wolder, a district of Maastricht, the Netherlands. Wolder was Louis XIV's headquarters during the Maastricht siege and he attended mass in the local church every day. In contrast, the archaeologist Wim Dijkman, curator of the historical collections of the city of Maastricht at Centre Céramique, says that there is no historical or archaeological evidence for the claim.

On March 25, 2026, during restoration work at the St Peter and Paul Church, subsiding floor tiles around the altar revealed a skeleton buried directly beneath, a site historically reserved for notable figures. Near the remains were a French coin dated around 1660 and fragments of a lead musket ball. DNA from the teeth was sent to a German laboratory to compare with descendants' genetic material, while other bones were studied in Deventer to assess age and biological sex.

== Marriage ==
On 5 March 1659, d'Artagnan married Anne-Charlotte Boyer de Chanlecy (1624–1683), lady of Sainte-Croix, and widow of Jean-Elenor de Damas. She was the daughter of Charles Boyer, lord of Chanlecy and Sainte-Croix, and Claude de Rymon, lady of la Rochette. The couple soon separated, d'Artagnan pursuing his military career while his wife left Paris to live on her lands at Sainte-Croix, where she died on 31 December 1683.

They had two sons, both of whom entered the military: Louis de Batz de Castelmore, who was born in 1660, took the title of count d’Artagnan and died at Château de Castelmore in December 1709, and Louis de Batz de Castelmore, who was born 4 July 1661 in Chalon-sur-Saône, was a knight, later known as count d’Artagnan, baron of Sainte-Croix, lord of Chanlecy and Castelmore, and became maréchal de camp. He married Marie Anne Amé (1670–1714) on 21 May 1707, and died on 7 June 1714, at the castle of Sainte-Croix.

== Portrayals in fiction ==
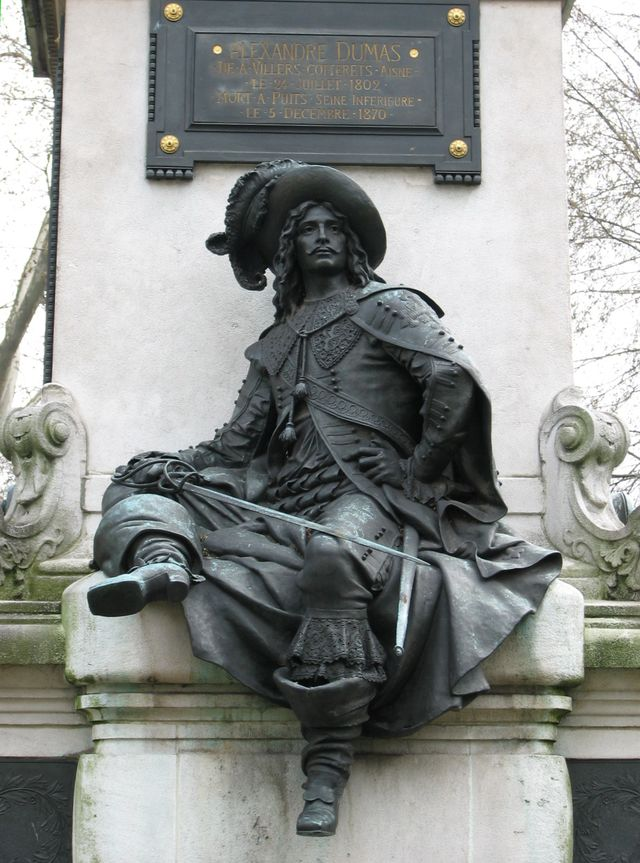
Statue of d'Artagnan on the Dumas monument in Paris

The real d'Artagnan's life was used as the basis for Gatien de Courtilz de Sandras' novel Les mémoires de M. d'Artagnan (1700). Alexandre Dumas in turn used Sandras' novel as the main source for his d'Artagnan Romances (1844-1850, The Three Musketeers, Twenty Years After and The Vicomte de Bragelonne), which cover d'Artagnan's career from his humble beginnings in Gascony to his death at Maastricht. Although Dumas knew that Sandras's version was heavily fictionalised, in the preface to The Three Musketeers he affected to believe that the memoirs were real, in order to make his novel more believable.

D'Artagnan is initially portrayed by Dumas as a hotheaded youth, who tries to engage the Comte de Rochefort and the three musketeers, Athos, Porthos, and Aramis in single combat. He quickly becomes friends with the musketeers, and has a series of adventures which put him at odds with Cardinal Richelieu, then First Minister of France. In the end, Richelieu is impressed by d'Artagnan, and makes him a lieutenant of the musketeers. This begins his long career of military service, as detailed in the sequels.

D'Artagnan's role among the musketeers is one of leadership (his skills and brains impress the musketeers greatly), but he is also regarded as a sort of protégé given his youth and inexperience. Athos sees him not only as a best friend and fellow musketeer but nearly as a son. At the end of the series, his death at the siege of Maastricht is given an extra tragic twist—he is mortally wounded while reading the notice of his promotion to the highest military rank.

Some scholars believe aspects of d'Artagnan are drawn from the life and character of Dumas's mixed-race father, General Thomas-Alexandre Dumas. The incident when d'Artagnan challenges Porthos, Athos, and Aramis to duels on the same afternoon might be based on an incident in General Dumas's youth when he was insulted; and their subsequent friendship on General Dumas's youthful companionship with fellow soldiers in the Queen's Dragoons.

=== Film and television ===
Actors who have played d'Artagnan on screen include:

- Orrin Johnson in The Three Musketeers (1916)
- Aimé Simon-Girard in Les Trois Mousquetaires (1921)
- Douglas Fairbanks in The Three Musketeers (1921), and The Iron Mask (1929)
- Walter Abel in The Three Musketeers (1935)
- Don Ameche in The Three Musketeers (1939)
- Warren William in The Man in the Iron Mask (1939)
- Gene Kelly in The Three Musketeers (1948)
- Louis Hayward in Lady in the Iron Mask (1952)
- Georges Marchal in Les Trois Mousquetaires (1953, French)
- Laurence Payne in The Three Musketeers (TV serial) (1954)
- Maximilian Schell in The Three Musketeers (TV movie) (1960)
- Gérard Barray in Les Trois Mousquetaires (1961, French)
- Jean Marais in Le Masque de fer (French film of The Man in the Iron Mask) (1962)
- George Nader in The Secret Mark of D'Artagnan (1962, Italian)
- Jean-Pierre Cassel in Cyrano and d'Artagnan (1964, French)
- Jim Backus in "The Three Musketeers", (an animated TV adaptation shown as a two-part episode of The Famous Adventures of Mr. Magoo) (1964)
- Jeremy Brett in The Three Musketeers (TV serial) (1966)
- John Greenwood in the Doctor Who episode, The Mind Robber (1968)
- Bruce Watson in The Three Musketeers (an animated American TV series) (1968)
- John Lynch in The First Churchills (BBC TV series), episode 1 "The Chaste Nymph" (1969)
- Kenneth Welsh in The Three Musketeers (Canadian TV movie) (1969)
- Sancho Gracia Los Tres Mosqueteros (TV series) (1971)
- Michael York in The Three Musketeers (1973), The Four Musketeers (1974), The Return of the Musketeers (1989), and La Femme Musketeer (TV miniseries) (2003)
- Mikhail Boyarsky in d'Artagnan and Three Musketeers (1978) and its sequels (1992, 1993, 2009)
- Louis Jourdan in The Man in the Iron Mask (TV movie) (1977)
- Cornel Wilde in The Fifth Musketeer (1979)
- Cam Clarke in Dogtanian and the Three Muskehounds (animated TV series) (1981)
- Nikolai Karachentsov in Dog in Boots (1981)
- Chris O'Donnell in The Three Musketeers (1993)
- Philippe Noiret in La fille de d'Artagnan (The Daughter of D'Artagnan aka Revenge of the Musketeers) (1994)
- Dennis Hayden in an early 1998 film of The Man in the Iron Mask
- Gabriel Byrne in The Man in the Iron Mask (1998)
- Justin Chambers in The Musketeer (2001)
- Hugh Dancy in Young Blades (unaired TV series pilot) (2001)
- Volodymyr Zelenskyy in Three Musketeers (2004 musical)
- Charles Shaughnessy in Young Blades (TV series) (2005)
- Logan Lerman in The Three Musketeers (2011)
- Rinal Mukhametov in The Three Musketeers (2013 series)
- Luke Pasqualino in The Musketeers (TV series) (2014–2016)
- Matt Ingram-Jones and Jonathan Hansler in The Fourth Musketeer (2022)
- François Civil in the diptych of films The Three Musketeers: D'Artagnan (2023) and The Three Musketeers: Milady (2024)

Wilde, in addition to his role listed above, played the same-named son of d'Artagnan as the main hero in At Sword's Point (1952); Tobias Mehler was similarly cast in the Young Blades series, while the indicated performance there by Shaughnessy was a single guest appearance as his famous father. Andrew Rannells voiced d'Artagnan in the Japanese anime Dinosaur King.

== See also ==
- Exhumation and reburial of Richard III of England

== Bibliography ==
- docteur Maurice Bats, Descent of d’Artagnan, Impr. F. Cocharaux, Auch, 1973, pp. 55 à 60.
- Samaran, Charles (1912), D'Artagnan, capitaine des mousquetaires du Roi: histoire véridique d'un héros de roman (in French), Paris: Calmann-Lévy
