= Mikhail Boyarsky =

Russian actor and singer (born 1949)

- Михаил Боярский
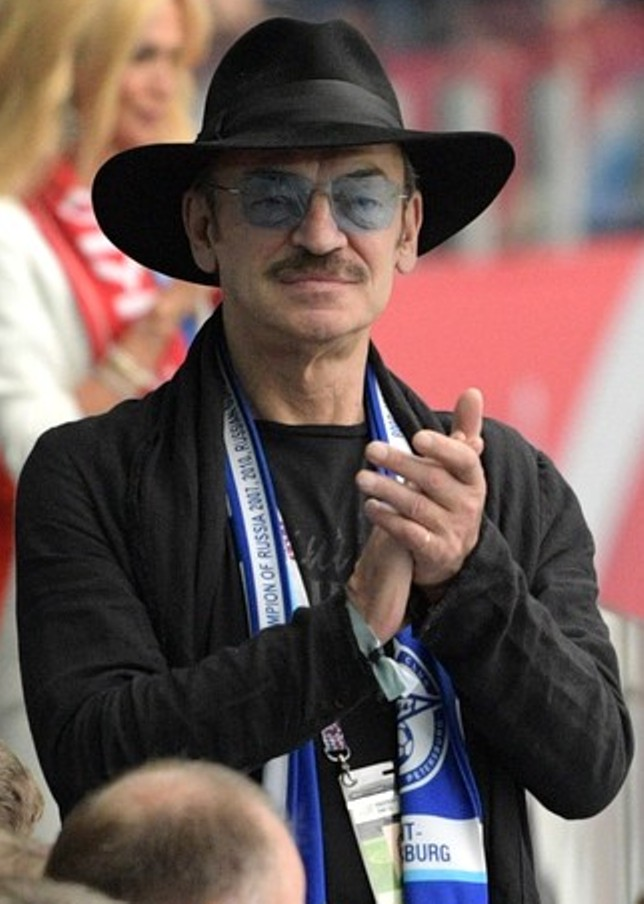
- Boyarsky in 2017
- Born: Mikhail Sergeyevich Boyarsky; 26 December 1949 (age 76); Leningrad, RSFSR, Soviet Union
- Occupations: Actor, singer, television presenter, musician, stuntman
- Years active: 1973–present (concert activity until 2023)
- Title: People’s Artist of the RSFSR (1990)
- Website: mboyarskiy.ru

Mikhail Sergeyevich Boyarsky (Russian: Михаи́л Серге́евич Боя́рский; born 26 December 1949) is a Russian actor and singer. He is best known for playing swashbucklers in historical adventure films; the role of d'Artagnan in the 1978 Soviet adaptation of Alexandre Dumas' Three Musketeers elevated Boyarsky to the nationwide fame.

== Biography ==
Mikhail Sergeyevich Boyarsky was born 26 December 1949 in Leningrad in the family of Sergey Aleksandrovich Boyarsky and Yekaterina Mikhailovna Melentyeva, both Komissarzhevskaya Theatre actors. He studied piano in a music school affiliated with the Conservatory. After school, Boyarsky entered Institute of Theatre Music and Cinema, finishing in 1972, and began working in the Lensovet Theatre for Igor Vladimirov.

In the cinema, the actor made a debut in the films Bridges and The Straw Hat (1974), becoming well known in 1975 after his role in the picture Eldest Son. He found much greater popularity in the main role of Troubadour in the theatre musical The Troubadour and His Friends, with the princess played by Larisa Luppian, who soon became his wife. In 1976, he played the big bad wolf in the movie Ma-ma.

His popularity really took off in 1978 after Boyarsky starred in the musical film D'Artagnan and Three Musketeers. After that, he was typecast as a swashbuckler for two decades; he reprised his role as d'Artagnan in three sequels and portrayed other "sword and hat" characters in adventure movies like The Dog in the Manger (1978), The Prisoner of Château d'If (1988), Gardes-Marines, Ahead! (1988), Don César de Bazan (1989), Viva Gardes-Marines! (1991), Queen Margot (1996) and Taras Bulba (2009), among others. Being a singer, he also often starred in musical films. Occasionally he played against type, like in Extra Ticket or The Waiting Room.

In 2023 Boyarsky retired from acting, because of his age and health issues.

== Political and social activity ==
In the 1996 presidential elections, Boyarsky campaigned for Boris Yeltsin, participating in the Vote or Lose program.

Boyarsky supports the policies pursued by Presidents Vladimir Putin and Dmitry Medvedev. In particular, he attributes to Putin the opening of the country's borders in the early 1990s:

K. Larina: It was not Putin who opened the borders, sorry.
M. Boyarsky: Then who did it?
K. Larina: Borders? I believe our borders were open after 1990.
M. Boyarsky: So consider that from that time on he already began to influence this...
K. Larina: Vladimir Putin?
M. Boyarsky: Vladimir Vladimirovich, yes. And now it has become possible to study in any country...

— Interview on the radio station Echo of Moscow, program Dithyramb with Ksenia Larina, 2008

By his own admission, Boyarsky is a conservative, a supporter of the monarchy, and an opponent of communist views.

...I am completely for Putin, for his successor, for the country to develop as they intended. This is very important for me, I am simply shocked by the percentages that the communist Zyuganov has. It’s just a mystery to me how much you can step on a rake. That is why I could not afford not to go and vote for Medvedev. I am categorically against any communist proposals. Then there will be no Gazprom, no anything else, no skating rinks, no sports. There will be khrushchevkas, there will be bombed churches, it will be equal for everyone. Zyuganov will take most of it for himself, out of nomenklatura habit. Therefore, I am categorically against this. <…> This party should have been banned a long time ago.

— Interview on the radio station Echo of Moscow, program Dithyramb with Ksenia Larina, 2008

In 2001, Boyarsky signed a letter in defense of the NTV channel.

In 2003, Boyarsky supported Valentina Matviyenko during the election campaign for governor of St. Petersburg. He has repeatedly supported the construction project of the Gazprom City skyscraper (since 2007, Okhta Center), starring in commercials for this project. In 2009, he issued an open letter to President Dmitry Medvedev for the construction of the Okhta Center. At the same time, many city residents actively opposed the project, and in December 2010, the decision to build it on the historical Okhtinsky Cape was canceled.

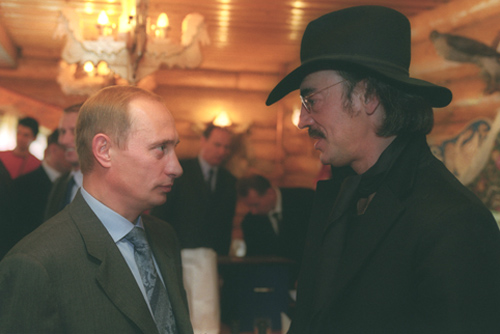
Mikhail Boyarsky and Vladimir Putin, 7 October 2000

On 6 February 2012, Boyarsky was officially registered as a trusted representative of the presidential candidate and then-Prime Minister Vladimir Putin.

Since April 2013, Boyarsky has been the leader of the Movement for the Rights of Smokers.

In March 2014, Boyarsky supported the annexation of Crimea and signed a letter to President Putin in support of the annexation.

In the 2016 Russian legislative election, Boyarsky became a trusted representative of the United Russia party.

In January 2018, Boyarsky was registered as a trusted representative of Vladimir Putin for the 2018 Russian presidential election.

In June 2018, Boyarsky spoke out in favor of raising the retirement age.

In December 2018, in a conversation with the general director of TV Rain, Natalya Sindeyeva, Boyarsky spoke in favor of introducing censorship in the field of cinema and theaters and for the re-establishment of artistic councils.

In February 2022, he supported the Russian invasion of Ukraine.

In February 2023, Canada sanctioned Mikhail Boyarsky for being involved in Russian propaganda and spreading misinformation relating to the 2022 war in Ukraine.

== Personal life ==
With Larisa Luppian, he has a son, Sergey Boyarsky (born in 1980), and a daughter, Elizaveta Boyarskaya (born 20 December 1985).

As a native of Saint Petersburg, Boyarsky is a fan of local FC Zenit.

== Popular songs ==
- Vse proidet
- Gorodskie Cveti
- Zelenoglazoe Taxi
- Lanfren-lanfra
- Spasibo, rodnaya
- Pesnya mushketyorov
- Syadu v skory poezd

== Honours and awards ==
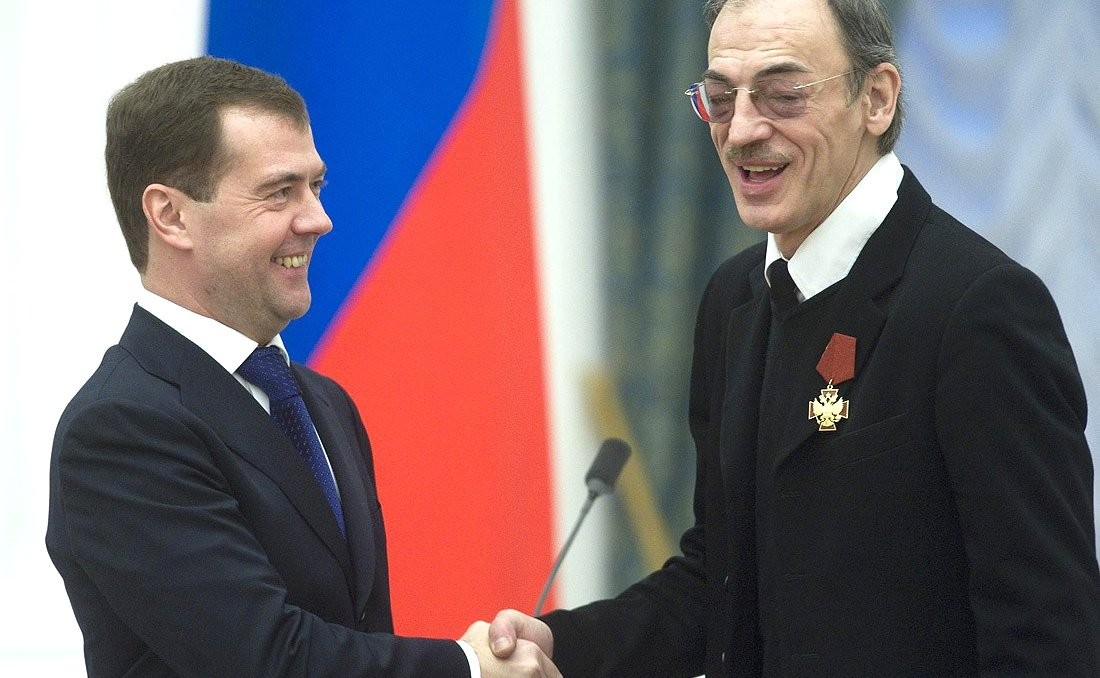
Presentation of the Order "For Merit to the Fatherland", 4th class with President Dmitry Medvedev, 28 December 2009

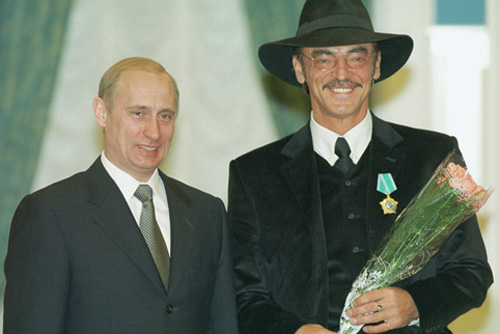
Presentation of the Order of Friendship with President Vladimir Putin, 22 January 2002

- Honored Artist of the RSFSR (1984)
- People's Artist of the RSFSR (1990)
- Order of Friendship (2001)
- Medal "In Commemoration of the 300th Anniversary of Saint Petersburg" (2003)
- Order "For Merit to the Fatherland", 4th class (2009)
- Order of Honour (Moldova) (2011)
- Order of Honour (2020)

== Filmography ==
Film/TV	Year	Role	Other notes
Ivan Tsarevich and the Gray Wolf 3	(2016)	Scholar Cat	Voice
Ivan Tsarevich and the Gray Wolf 2	(2013)	Scholar Cat	Voice
Sherlock Holmes	(2013)	Inspector Lestrade	TV Series
Peter the Great: The Testament	(2011)	Dimitrie Cantemir	TV Mini-Series
Ivan Tsarevich and the Gray Wolf	(2011)	Scholar Cat	Voice
Taras Bulba	(2009)	Moisei Shilo	Based on novel by Nikolai Gogol
The Return of the Musketeers, or The Treasures of Cardinal Mazarin	(2009)	d'Artagnan	
Schastliviy	(2005)		TV mini-series ... a.k.a. Lucky
The Idiot	(2003)	Keller	TV mini-series
Plachu vperyod!	(2001)	Mikhail Raspyatov, an actor	a.k.a. ... I Pay in Advance!
The New Bremen Town Musicians	(2000)	King	Voice
Zal ozhidaniya	(1998)	Vitya	TV series ... a.k.a. the Waiting Room
Koroleva Margo	(1996)	Maurevel (Morvel)	TV series ... a.k.a. Queen Margot
The Secret of Queen Anne or Musketeers Thirty Years After	(1993)	d'Artagnan	
Musketeers Twenty Years After	(1992)	d'Artagnan	
Tartyuf	(1992)	Tartuffe	(TV) ... a.k.a. Tartuffe
Choknute	(1991)	Nikolai I, the Tsar	a.k.a. Crazies
Viva Gardes-Marines!	(1991)	de Brillieu	a.k.a. Vivat, Midshipmen!
Don Cesar de Bazan	(1989)	Don César	(TV) a.k.a. Don César de Bazan
Iskusstvo zhit' v Odesse	(1989)	M. Boyarsky	a.k.a. The Art of Living in Odesa
The Prisoner of Château d'If	(1988)	Fernan Mondego, Count de Morcerf	a.k.a. The Count of Monte-Cristo, a.k.a. The Prisoner of If Castle
A Man from the Boulevard des Capucines	(1987)	Cherny (Black)	
Gardemarines ahead!	(1987)	Chevalier de Brillieu	TV mini-series ... a.k.a. Midshipmen, Charge!
Higher Than Rainbow	(1986)	Alik's Dad	(TV) ... a.k.a. Above the Rainbow
Gum-gam	(1985)		
Geroy eyo romana	(1984)		a.k.a. Hero of Her Romance
Lishniy bilet	(1983)		a.k.a. Extra Ticket
Peppi Dlinniy Chulok	(1982)	Captain Dlinniy Chulok, Peppi's father	(TV) a.k.a. Pippi Longstocking
Tamozhnya	(1982)	Yuri Khorunzhev	a.k.a. Customs
Dusha	(1981)		a.k.a. Soul
Kuda on denetsya!	(1981)		
Nesravnennyy Nakonechnikov	(1981)		a.k.a. The Incomparable Nakonechnikov
Letuchiy korabl	(1979)	(voice)	a.k.a. Flying Ship
Svatovstvo gusara	(1979)		(TV)
d'Artagnan and Three Musketeers	(1978)	D'Artagnan	TV mini-series
Komissiya po rassledovaniyu	(1978)		a.k.a. The Investigation Commission
Poka bezumstvuyet mechta	(1978)		a.k.a. While the Dream Is Raving
Povar i pevitsa	(1978)	(voice) Barmaleyev	a.k.a. A Cook and a Singer
The Dog in the Manger	(1978)	Teodoro	(TV)
Dikiy Gavrila	(1976)		
Goluboy shchenok	(1976)	Pirate (voice)	a.k.a. Blue Puppy
Kak Ivanushka-durachok za chudom khodil	(1976)	Konokrad	a.k.a. How Ivanushka the Fool Travelled in Search of Wonder
Ma-ma	(1976)	Seriy (Grey) the Wolf	a.k.a. Mummy; a.k.a. Rock'n Roll Wolf
Poezd pamyati	(1976)	(voice)	
Sentimental Romance	(1976)		
New Year Adventures of Masha and Vitya	(1975)	Kot Matvey	(TV)
The Elder Son	(1976)	Silva	
The Straw Hat	(1974)	Ninardi	TV mini-series
Truffaldino from Bergamo	(1972)	Truffaldino (voice) (uncredited)	a.k.a. Truffaldino from Bergamo

=== Channel voice ===
- 2011 — Busy Beavers — Allagator
