= Georgi Yumatov =

Soviet and Russian actor (1926–1997)

- Yumatov on a 2026 postcard of Russia
- Born: 11 March 1926; Moscow, Soviet Union
- Died: 6 October 1997 (aged 71); Moscow, Russia
- Occupation: Actor
- Years active: 1946–1994

Georgi Aleksandrovich Yumatov (Russian: Гeopгий Алeксандpoвич Юматов, IPA: [ɡʲɪˈorɡʲɪj jʊˈmatəf]; 11 March 1926 – 6 October 1997) was a Soviet and Russian film actor. He appeared in 72 films between 1946 and 1994. He was a People’s Artist of the RSFSR (1982).

== Biography ==
Yumatov was born on 11 March 1926, in Moscow, to a Russian family. A veteran of the Great Patriotic War. In 1941 and 1942, he studied at the Naval School. In 1942, he was enrolled as a cabin boy on the torpedo boat "The Brave", and a year later he became its helmsman. He participated in the siege of Budapest. He distinguished himself in the battle for Vienna in the assault on the bridge. During this battle he was awarded the Medal of Ushakov. He was wounded several times and also shell-shocked.

After the war, Yumatov returned to Moscow and was noticed by Grigori Aleksandrov in a cafe. He invited Yumatov for a small part in his upcoming comedy Spring (1947). After that Aleksandrov took him to Sergei Gerasimov and suggested to try him as a student at VGIK, but Gerasimov answered: "I have nothing to teach him. He has a natural gift". He showed Yumatov to the State Theater of Movie Actors and in a couple of years cast him in the top-grossing film The Young Guard. This launched his film career.

Between 1950 and 1970, Yumatov performed in many popular war and action films, usually portraying heroic, yet down-to-earth lads with a glimpse of humour. His personal favourite role was Venka Malyshev from the 1959 film Cruelty. In 1971, he played the main part in Officers alongside Vasily Lanovoy. While Yumatov didn't have much regard for this role nor for the film, it quickly turned into a cult classic. Seen by 53.4 million viewers at the time of release, it became his most recognizable film and was given a second birth in 2011 after colorization.

Around the same time, Yumatov started drinking heavily. It was speculated that the reason for this was his wife — an actress Muza Krepkogorskaya — who refused to have children. They met at VGIK during the 1940s and lived together up till Yumatov's death. Krepkogorskaya was never as popular as her husband, even though he made sure that she was given at least minor roles in every movie he appeared in. She was afraid that pregnancy might ruin her chance to perform "the role of her life" and kept making abortions. At one point she made an abortion when she was four months pregnant and lost the ability to give birth at all. It became a great shock for Yumatov.

Despite the big success of Officers, Yumatov's career started going downhill. During the 1980s, he performed in several popular crime TV series, but with the collapse of the USSR he was left without any job. In 1994, Yumatov shot dead a 33-year-old janitor who helped him bury his dog. Investigation showed that after the burial they drank in the dog's memory, and the janitor told Georgi that he regretted that the Nazis hadn't won the war. Yumatov, a war veteran, was outraged and started a fight, during which he was wounded in the head with a kitchen knife. The actor then grabbed a trophy rifle from the wall and shot the janitor. He spent two months in prison, but was pardoned on account of his military service following the 1995 amnesty dedicated to 50 years since the Soviet victory in the Great Patriotic War.

After that, Yumatov stopped drinking, started visiting church, and spent all his time with his wife. Yet the following years saw a quick demise of his health. On 9 May 1997, he made his last appearance in public, appearing on The Field of Wonders, dedicated to the war victory. Soon he was diagnosed with aortic aneurysm. He died on 4 October 1997, aged 71, in Moscow. He was buried at the Vagankovo Cemetery. In two years, his wife Muza Krepkogorskaya also died.

== Selected filmography ==
Year	English Title	Original Title	Role
1946	Ivan the Terrible, Part II	Иван Грозный. Сказ второй: Боярский заговор	monk
1947	Spring	Весна	make-up artist
1948	The Young Guard	Молодая гвардия	Anatoly Popov
1950	Zhukovsky	Жуковский	Kasyanov
1953	Admiral Ushakov	Адмирал Ушаков	Viktor Ermolaev
1953	Attack from the Sea	Корабли штурмуют бастионы	Viktor Ermolaev
1953	Hostile Whirlwinds	Вихри враждебные	Balandin the waif
1954	Heroes of Shipka	Герои Шипки	Sashko Kozir
1955	Road to Life	Педагогическая поэма	Sasha Zadorov
1956	They Were the First	Они были первыми	Stepan Barabash
1959	Ballad of a Soldier	Баллада о солдате	soldier
1959	Cruelty	Жестокость	Venka Malyshev
1962	A Trip Without a Load	Порожний рейс	Nikolay Khromov
1965	The Cook	Стряпуха	Seraphim Chaika
1967	The Seventh Companion	Седьмой спутник	Turka
1967	Don't Forget... Lugovaya Station	Не забудь… станция Луговая	Georgy Ryabov
1969	Dangerous Tour	Опасные гастроли	Maxim
1971	Officers	Офицеры	Alexey Trofimov
1975	It Can't Be!	Не может быть!	Man with a bulldog
1977	Destiny	Судьба	Pekarev the partizan
1979	Moscow Does Not Believe in Tears	Москва слезам не верит	cameo
1980	Petrovka, 38	Петровка, 38	Aleksey Pavlovich Sadchikov
1984	TASS Is Authorized to Declare...	ТАСС уполномочен заявить…	Ivan Belyu
1990	Stalin's Funeral	Похороны Сталина	Stalin's guard
1991	Loaded with Death	Заряжённые смертью	Savva Ilyich, sea captain

== Honours and awards ==
- Order of the Patriotic War 2nd class
- Ushakov Medal
- Medal "For the Capture of Vienna"
- Medal "For the Capture of Budapest"
- Medal "For the Victory over Germany in the Great Patriotic War 1941–1945"
- Jubilee Medal "Twenty Years of Victory in the Great Patriotic War 1941-1945"
- Jubilee Medal "Thirty Years of Victory in the Great Patriotic War 1941-1945"
- Jubilee Medal "Forty Years of Victory in the Great Patriotic War 1941-1945"
- Jubilee Medal "50 Years of Victory in the Great Patriotic War 1941-1945"
- Honoured Artist of the RSFSR
