= Aramis =

Fictional character by Alexandre Dumas

- d'Artagnan Romances character
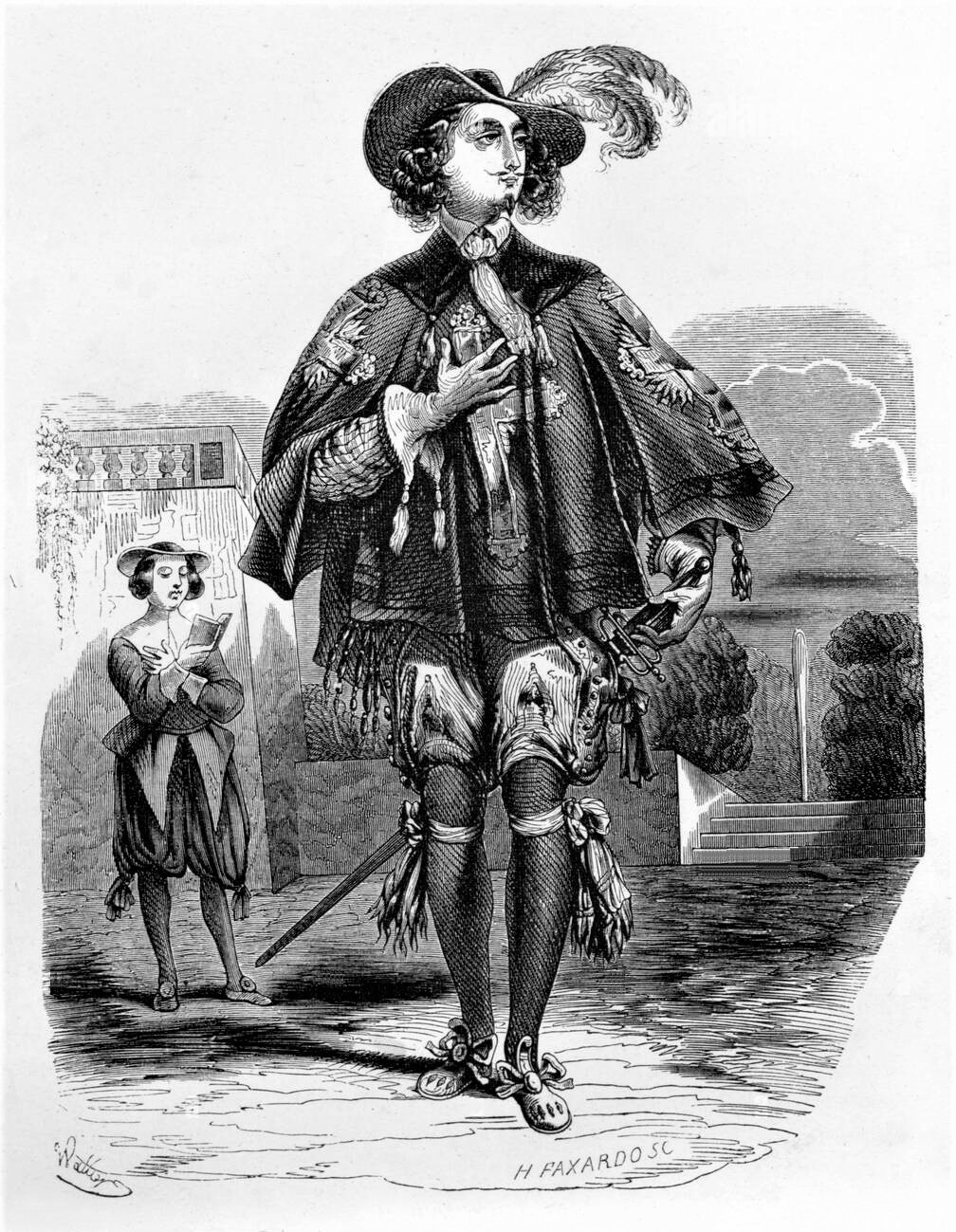
- First appearance: The Three Musketeers
- Last appearance: The Vicomte of Bragelonne: Ten Years Later
- Created by: Alexandre Dumas, père

In-universe information
- Gender: Male
- Occupation: Musketeer, priest, bishop, plotter
- Religion: Roman Catholic
- Nationality: French

René d'Herblay, alias Aramis, is a fictional character in the novels The Three Musketeers (1844), Twenty Years After (1845), and The Vicomte de Bragelonne (1847–1850) by Alexandre Dumas. He and the other two musketeers, Athos and Porthos, are friends of the novels' protagonist, d'Artagnan.

The fictional Aramis is loosely based on the historical musketeer Henri d'Aramitz.

== Personality ==
Aramis loves and courts women, which fits well with the opinions of the time regarding Jesuits and abbots. He is portrayed as constantly ambitious and unsatisfied; as a musketeer, he yearns to become an abbé; but as an abbé, he wishes for the life of the soldier. In The Three Musketeers, it is revealed that he became a musketeer because of a woman and his arrogance; as a young man in training for the priesthood, he had the misfortune to be caught (innocently or not) reading to a young married woman and thrown out of her house. For the next year, he studied fencing with the best swordsman in town to get his revenge. He then challenged the man who had mistreated him to a duel and thanks to his newly learned fencing skills, killed him almost at once. Because duels were forbidden by royal edict and Aramis was a novice, he had to disappear and adopt a very low profile. He enlisted in the Musketeers under the assumed name of "Aramis". There he met Athos, Porthos and later d'Artagnan. Together, they worked to protect the king and to keep the queen's affair with the Duke of Buckingham from being revealed by Cardinal Richelieu.

Aramis meets with great success, thanks to his Machiavellian plans and his audacity. He sees every victory as a step to climb to even greater power. Eventually, he is named Superior General of the Jesuits, which is precisely what saves his life at the end of Le Vicomte De Bragelonne, after he is betrayed by Nicolas Fouquet.

Despite his ruthless personal ambition, Aramis is an extremely loyal friend: in fact, his only mistakes come when he refuses to harm or offend his friends. In Twenty Years After, he follows Athos's pleas to spare the life of the villain Mordaunt, and in Le Vicomte De Bragelonne, he refuses to suppress d'Artagnan's discovery of the truth about Belle-Île-en-Mer. Aramis even tells his friend Porthos the true identity of the Man in the Iron Mask, despite fearing that this will lead Porthos to kill him (Aramis). Friendship is so important to Aramis that, at the end of Le Vicomte De Bragelonne, it is strongly implied that he cries - for the first and only time in his life - after causing the death of one of his friends.

== Mistresses ==
Aramis' political intrigues are matched by (and usually connected with) his amorous intrigues, as Dumas casts him in the role of the lover of politically powerful women of his time. In The Three Musketeers ca. 1627, he is the lover of the Duchesse de Chevreuse, the confidante of the queen. In Twenty Years After he is the lover of the Duchesse de Longueville and, it is broadly implied, the father of her son.

== Names ==
In contrast to the other musketeers, Aramis is twice referred to by his first name René. This first happens when d'Artagnan stumbles upon Aramis and his mistress in the chapter "Les Deux Gaspard" of the second book, and again when Bazin is talking about Aramis in the third book. In Twenty Years After, Aramis is a Jesuit known as the Abbé d'Herblay or Chevalier d'Herblay. In The Vicomte de Bragelonne he is the Bishop of Vannes, a title given to him by Nicolas Fouquet, and later becomes the Superior General of the Jesuits. When he comes back from exile, he is a Spanish noble and ambassador known as Duke of Alameda.

== In film and television ==
Actors who have played Aramis on screen include:

- Harold M. Shaw, in The Three Musketeers: Parts I and II (1911)
- C.N. Mortensen, in The Three Musketeers (1916)
- Pierre de Guingand, in Les trois mousquetaires (1921)
- Eugene Pallette, in The Three Musketeers (1921)
- Gino Corrado, in The Iron Mask (1929)
- Jean-Louis Allibert, in Les Trois Mousquetaires (1933)
- Onslow Stevens, in The Three Musketeers (1935)
- Miles Mander, in The Three Musketeers (1939)
- Robert Coote, in The Three Musketeers (1948)
- Keith Richards, in The Three Musketeers (1950)
- Judd Holdren, in Lady in the Iron Mask (1952)
- Jacques François, in Les Trois Mousquetaires (1953)
- Paul Hansard, in The Three Musketeers (1954)
- Paul Campbell, in The Three Musketeers (1956) and Le Avventure dei tre moschettieri (1957)
- Tim O'Connor, in The Three Musketeers (TV movie) (1960)
- Jaques Toja, in Les Trois Mousquetaires: La Vengeance de Milady (1961) and Les Trois Mousquetaires: Les Ferrets de la Reine (1961)
- Roberto Risso, in D’Artagnan contro i tre moschettieri (1963)
- Gary Watson, in The Three Musketeers (1966)
- John Woodvine, in The Further Adventures of the Three Musketeers (1967)
- Roger Sterckx, in Die Drie Musketiers (1968)
- Noel Willman, in The Man in the Iron Mask (1968)
- Colin Fox, in The Three Musketeers (1969)
- Richard Chamberlain, in The Three Musketeers (1973), The Four Musketeers (1974), and The Return of the Musketeers (1989)
- Georges Mansart, in The Four Charlots Musketeers (1974)
- Igor Starygin, in D'Artanyan i Tri Mushketyora (1978), Mushketyory 20 Let Spustya (1992), and Tayna Korolevy Anny ili Mushketyory 30 Let Spustya (1993)
- Lloyd Bridges, in The Fifth Musketeer (1979)
- Eiko Yamada, in Anime San Jushi (1987)
- Charlie Sheen, in The Three Musketeers (1993)
- Sami Frey, in Revenge of the Musketeers (1994)
- William Richert, in an early 1998 film of The Man in the Iron Mask
- Jeremy Irons, in The Man in the Iron Mask (1998)
- Thomas Beckett, in Three Musketeers (1999)
- Callum Blue, in Young Blades (2001) (unaired TV series pilot)
- Nick Moran, in The Musketeer (2001)
- Allan Corduner, in La Femme Musketeer (TV miniseries) (2003)
- Grégori Derangère, in D'Artagnan et les trois mousquetaires (2005)
- Nick Jonas, in The Three Musketeers (Disney TV series JONAS)
- Luke Evans, in The Three Musketeers (film in 3D) (2011)
- Santiago Cabrera, in The Musketeers (TV series) (2014 - 2016)
- Romain Duris, in Les Trois Mousquetaires: D'Artagnan (2023 film) and Les Trois Mousquetaires: Milady (2023 film)
