= Athos (character) =

Character in The Three Musketeers by Alexandre Dumas

- d'Artagnan Romances character
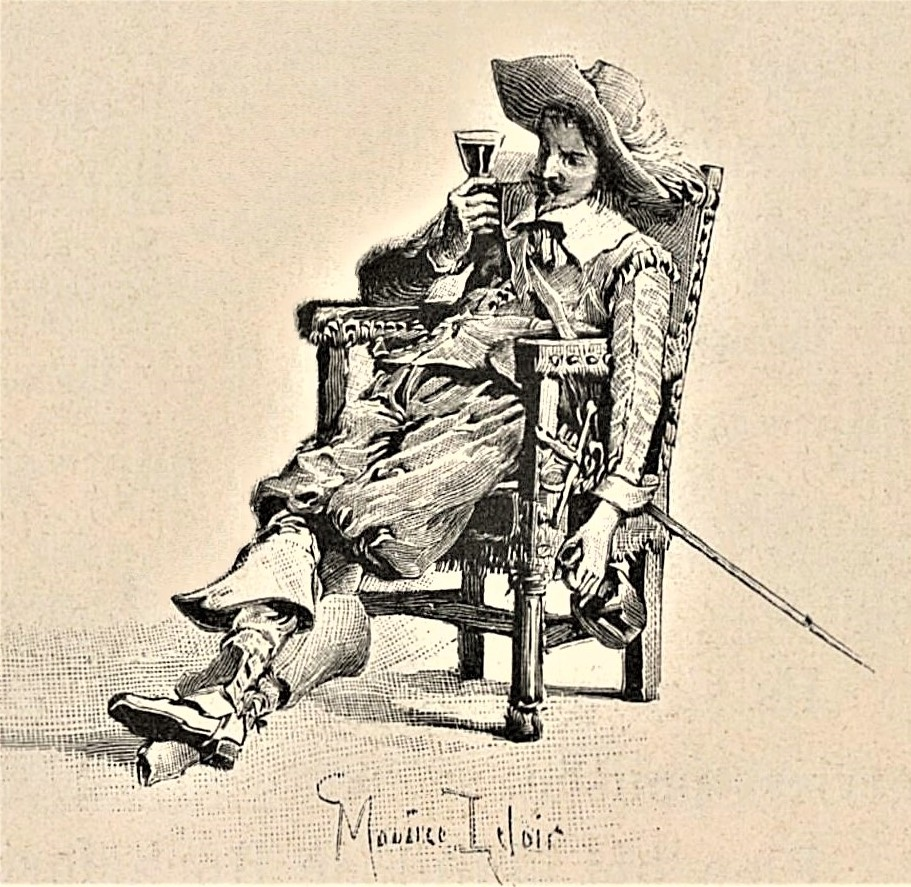
- First appearance: The Three Musketeers
- Last appearance: The Vicomte of Bragelonne: Ten Years Later
- Created by: Alexandre Dumas

In-universe information
- Gender: Male
- Title: Count
- Occupation: Musketeer
- Spouse: Milady de Winter
- Children: Raoul, Vicomte de Bragelonne
- Relatives: Mordaunt (stepson)
- Nationality: French

Athos, Count de la Fère, is a fictional character in the novels The Three Musketeers (1844), Twenty Years After (1845) and The Vicomte de Bragelonne (1847–1850) by Alexandre Dumas. He is a highly fictionalised version of the historical musketeer Armand d'Athos (1615–1643).

== In the novels ==
In The Three Musketeers, Athos, Porthos, and Aramis are friends of the novel's protagonist, d'Artagnan. Athos has a mysterious past connecting him with the villain of the novel, Milady de Winter. The oldest of the group by some years, Athos is described as noble and handsome but also taciturn and melancholy, drowning his secret sorrows in drink. He is very protective of d'Artagnan, the youngest, whom he eventually treats as his brother. By the end of the novel, it is revealed that he is the Count de la Fère. He was once married to Milady de Winter and attempted to kill her after discovering that she was a criminal on the run, an event which left him bitter and disillusioned. However, during the course of this novel, he is able to get his revenge on Milady.

In the second novel, Twenty Years After, he has retired from the Musketeers and abandoned his nom-de-guerre of Athos. He has fathered an illegitimate son, Raoul, with Marie de Rohan (Aramis's former mistress) and then adopted the boy, making him the vicomte de Bragelonne. Fatherhood makes Athos a much happier man, but after launching Raoul into a military career, Athos looks for new causes to occupy his life. He embraces the Fronde and then a doomed mission to rescue Charles I of England. He is uncharacteristically terrified by the appearance of Mordaunt, Milady's son, who is attempting to avenge the death of his mother. Athos, despite his reluctance to engage with the son of his ex-wife, ends up forced to slay him in an underwater fight in the English Channel.

In the third novel, The Vicomte de Bragelonne, Athos takes a major behind-the-scenes part in historical events, first helping with the restoration of Charles II to the throne of England and then being entrusted with the diplomatic task of arranging the wedding of Henrietta of England and Philippe I, Duke of Orléans. Athos eventually falls out with King Louis XIV, who has seduced his son Raoul's fiancée and is briefly thrown into the Bastille for voicing his contempt. After being pardoned at d'Artagnan's instigation, Athos withdraws to his home, where he dies of sorrow after Raoul is killed in war.

Athos' first name is never told in the novels. However, in Dumas's play The Youth of the Musketeers, the young Milady, then named Charlotte, calls him "Olivier."

== Sources ==
The fictional Athos is named after the historical musketeer Armand, Seigneur de Sillègue, d'Athos, et d'Autevielle ("Lord of Sillègue, Athos, and Autevielle"), better known as Armand d'Athos, though they have little in common beyond the surname. His birthplace is the commune of Athos-Aspis in the Pyrénées-Atlantiques department. The name also resembles Mount Athos; in chapter 13 of The Three Musketeers, a Bastille guard says, "But that is not a man's name; that is the name of a mountain." His title, Count de la Fère, while invented, is tied to the domains of La Fère which were once owned by Anne of Austria, Queen of France in these novels and in the historical period in which they are set.

== Film and television portrayals ==
- Herbert Delmar, in The Three Musketeers: Parts I and II (1911)
- Alfred Hollingsworth, in The Three Musketeers (1916)
- Henri Rollan, in Les trois mousquetaires (1921)
- Léon Bary, in The Three Musketeers (1921) and The Iron Mask (1929)
- Henri Rollan, in Les Trois Mousquetaires (1933)
- Paul Lukas, in The Three Musketeers (1935)
- Douglass Dumbrille, in The Three Musketeers (1939)
- Bert Roach in The Man in the Iron Mask (1939)
- Van Heflin, in The Three Musketeers (1948)
- John Hubbard, in The Three Musketeers (1950)
- Steve Brodie, in Lady in the Iron Mask (1952)
- Jean Martinelli, in Les Trois Mousquetaires (1953)
- Roger Delgado, in The Three Musketeers (1954)
- Domenico Modugno, in The Three Musketeers (1956)
- Barry Morse, in The Three Musketeers (TV movie) (1960)
- Georges Descrières, in Les Trois Mousquetaires: La Vengeance de Milady (1961) and Les Trois Mousquetaires: Les Ferrets de la Reine (1961)
- Franco Fantasia, in D’Artagnan contro i tre moschettieri (1963)
- Jeremy Watson, in The Three Musketeers (1966)
- Jeremy Young, in The Further Adventures of the Three Musketeers (1967)
- Erik Maes, in Die Drie Musketiers (1968)
- Powys Thomas, in The Three Musketeers (1969)
- Oliver Reed, in The Three Musketeers (1973), The Four Musketeers (1974), and The Return of the Musketeers (1989)
- Yvan Tanguy, in The Four Charlots Musketeers (1974)
- Veniamin Smekhov, in D'Artagnan and Three Musketeers (1978), Musketeers Twenty Years After (1992), and The Secret of Queen Anne or Musketeers Thirty Years After (1993)
- José Ferrer, in The Fifth Musketeer (1979)
- Akira Kamiya, in Anime San Jushi (1987)
- Kiefer Sutherland, in The Three Musketeers (1993)
- Jean-Luc Bideau, in Revenge of the Musketeers (1994)
- Edward Albert, in the 1998 film The Face of Alexandre Dumas (also released as The Man in the Iron Mask)
- John Malkovich, in The Man in the Iron Mask (1998)
- Gordon Carpenter, in Three Musketeers (1999)
- Scott Hickman, in Young Blades (2001) (unaired TV series pilot)
- Jan-Gregor Kremp, in The Musketeer (2001)
- Christopher Cazenove, in La Femme Musketeer (TV miniseries) (2003)
- Heino Ferch, in D'Artagnan et les trois mousquetaires (2005)
- Kevin Jonas, in The Three Musketeers (Disney TV series JONAS)
- Matthew Macfadyen, in The Three Musketeers (2011)
- Tom Burke, in The Musketeers (TV series) (2014–2016)
- Vincent Cassel in The Three Musketeers: D'Artagnan (2023) and The Three Musketeers: Milady (2023)

== Other mentions ==
The South-East Asian stone loach Schistura athos is named after the character of Athos and there are two more species in the genus Schistura which are each named after one of the Three Musketeers, S. aramis and S. porthos.
