= Porthos =

Fictional character in novels by Alexandre Dumas

- d'Artagnan Romances character
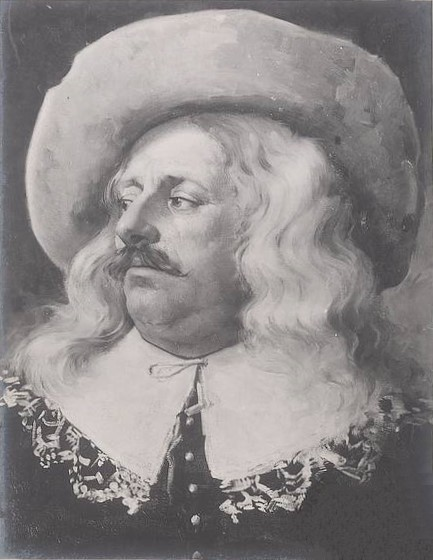
- First appearance: The Three Musketeers
- Last appearance: The Vicomte of Bragelonne: Ten Years Later
- Created by: Alexandre Dumas, père

In-universe information
- Gender: Male
- Title: Baron
- Occupation: Musketeer
- Spouse: Madame Coquenard
- Nationality: French

Porthos, Baron du Vallon de Bracieux de Pierrefonds is a fictional character in the novels The Three Musketeers (1844), Twenty Years After (1845), and The Vicomte de Bragelonne (1847–1850) by Alexandre Dumas. He and the other two musketeers, Athos and Aramis, are friends of the novel's protagonist, d'Artagnan. Porthos is a highly fictionalized version of the historical musketeer Isaac de Porthau.

== Name ==
In The Three Musketeers, his family name is du Vallon. In Twenty Years After, having made a financially advantageous marriage, his surname is du Vallon de Bracieux de Pierrefonds. He eventually earns the title of Baron. His real first name is never given; "Porthos" is a nom de guerre, assumed upon joining the Musketeers.

== Personality ==
Porthos, honest and slightly gullible, is the extrovert of the group, enjoying wine, women and song. Though he is often seen as the comic relief, he is also extremely dedicated and loyal toward his friends and fellow Musketeers and stands out for his physical strength and size. His eating abilities even impress King Louis XIV during a banquet at Fontainebleau. As the story advances, he looks more and more like a giant, and his death is that of a titan.

At the time of The Three Musketeers (ca. 1627), he apparently has few lands or other resources to draw from. He is finally able to extract sufficient funds from an elderly lawyer's somewhat younger wife (whom he was romancing and later married) to equip himself for the Siege of La Rochelle.

== Film and television ==
Actors who have played Porthos on screen include:

- Jack Chagnon, in The Three Musketeers: Parts I and II (1911)
- Edward Kenny, in The Three Musketeers (1916)
- Charles Martinelli, in Les trois mousquetaires (1921)
- George Siegmann, in The Three Musketeers (1921)
- Tiny Sandford, in The Iron Mask (1929)
- Moroni Olsen, in The Three Musketeers (1935) and At Sword's Point (1952)
- Alan Hale, Sr. in The Man in the Iron Mask (1939)
- Gig Young, in The Three Musketeers (1948)
- John Colicos, in The Three Musketeers (TV movie) (1960)
- Frank Finlay, in The Three Musketeers (1973), The Four Musketeers (1974), and The Return of the Musketeers (1989)
- Alan Hale, Jr., in The Fifth Musketeer (1979)
- Valentin Smirnitsky, in D'Artagnan and Three Musketeers (1978) and its sequels (1992, 1993)
- Oliver Platt, in The Three Musketeers (1993)
- Raoul Billerey, in La Fille de d'Artagnan (1994)
- Rex Ryon, in an early 1998 film of The Man in the Iron Mask
- Gérard Depardieu, in The Man in the Iron Mask (1998)
- Steve Speirs, in The Musketeer (2001)
- Anthony Strachan, in Young Blades (unaired TV series pilot) (2001)
- John Rhys-Davies, in two episodes of The Secret Adventures of Jules Verne (2000) and La Femme Musketeer (TV movie) (2003)
- Joe Jonas, in The Three Musketeers (Disney TV series JONAS)
- Ray Stevenson in The Three Musketeers (2011)
- David Ogden Stiers in Mickey, Donald, Goofy: The Three Musketeers (2012)
- Howard Charles in The Musketeers (TV series) (2014–2016)
