= Musketeer =

Type of soldier equipped with a musket

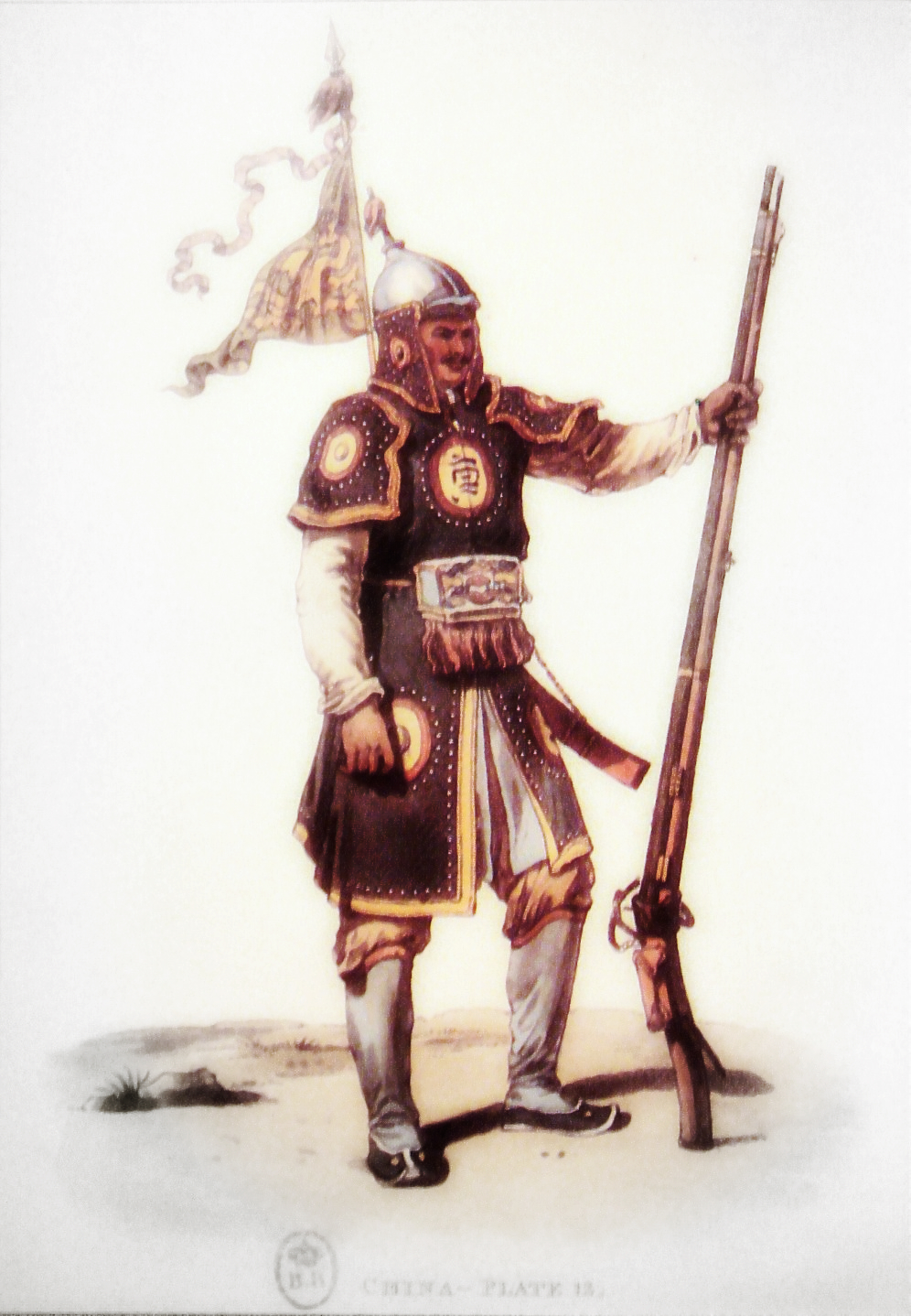
1793 painting of a Chinese Firearm Battalion musketeer

A musketeer (French: mousquetaire [muskətɛʁ]) was a type of soldier equipped with a musket. Musketeers were an important part of early modern warfare from the mid 15th to mid 19th centuries, particularly in Europe, where they normally comprised the majority of their infantry after 1600. The musketeer was a precursor to the rifleman. Muskets were replaced by breech loading rifles as the almost universal firearm for modern armies during the period 1850 to 1870. The traditional designation of "musketeer" for an infantry private survived in the Imperial German Army until World War I.

== Historical antecedents ==
The hand cannon was invented in Song dynasty China in the 12th century and was in widespread use there in the 13th century. It spread westward across Asia during the 14th century. The hand cannon evolved into the arquebus that appeared in Europe and the Ottoman Empire during the 15th century. The term musket was originally used to describe a heavy arquebus capable of penetrating heavy armor. Although this heavy version of the musket fell out of use after the mid-16th century with the decline of heavy armor, the term "musket" remained as a general descriptor and lent its name to the infantry type known as the musketeer.

== Musketeers in early modern Europe ==
Musketeers are primarily associated with infantry in early modern Europe, and were employed by many European nations.

=== Spain ===
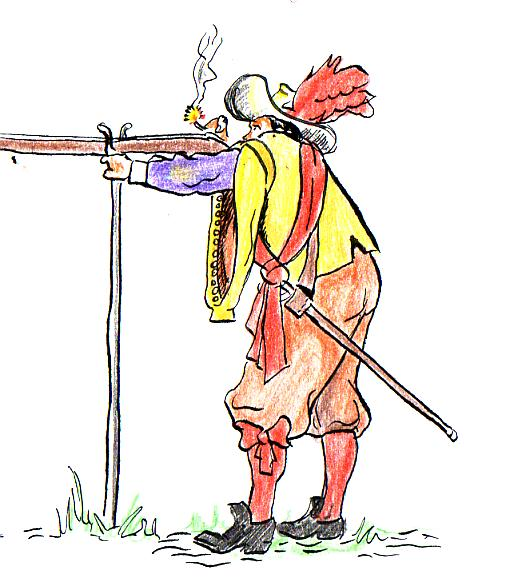
A Spanish tercio musketeer in c. 1650

In the Spanish army, the tercio or the Spanish square was a mixed infantry formation that theoretically could number up to 3,000 pikemen, swordsmen and musketeers; although it was usually much smaller on the battlefield. It was effective in its era, capitalizing on the close-quarter impact of the pike combined with the long-range projectile capabilities of the musket. It resembled a loosely formed phalanx in function, but was far more flexible and deadly. Musketeers were developed by the Spanish during the Italian Wars so as to deal with the heavily armored French Gendarmes. An arquebus was not powerful enough to take down an armored knight, but a wall gun was. Spanish field commanders wanted to bring the firepower of a small wall gun onto the battlefield yet have it be as maneuverable as an arquebus. The solution was a bigger arquebus, but the additional weight made it extremely difficult to support the barrel during aiming and firing; hence, the musket rest, the precursor to the monopod. Furthermore, musketeers were the first infantry to give up armor entirely. Other than the musket rest, the musketeer's equipage was upgraded from a powder flask to a bandolier. Due to the difficulty in manipulating the musket rest and the strength needed to handle the heavier gun, musketeers were stronger men and paid more than the rest of the infantry.

=== France ===
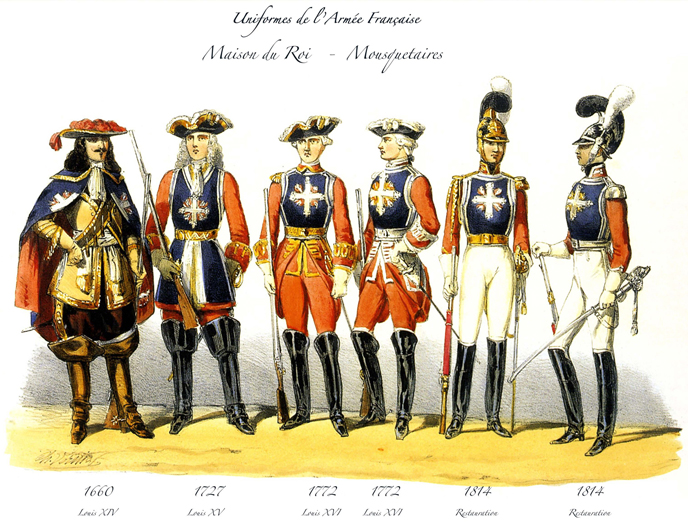
Uniforms of Musketeers of the Guard from 1660 to 1814

The Musketeers of the Guard were a junior unit, initially of roughly company strength, of the military branch of the Royal Household. They were created in 1622 when Louis XIII furnished a company of light cavalry (the "carabiniers", created by Louis' father Henry IV) with muskets. Musketeers fought in battle both on foot as infantry and on horseback as dragoons. At the Battle of Fontenoy in 1745 the King's Musketeers served as regular cavalry, charging British infantry with drawn swords.

As one of the junior units in the Royal Guard, the Musketeers were not closely linked to the royal family. Traditional bodyguard duties were in fact performed by the Garde du Corps and the Cent-suisses. Because of its later establishment, the Musketeers were open to the lower classes of French nobility or younger sons from noble families whose oldest sons served in the more prestigious Garde du Corps and Chevau-legers (Light Horse). The Musketeers, many of them still teenagers, soon gained a reputation for fighting spirit and unruly behaviour.

Their high esprit de corps gained royal favor for the Musketeers, and they were frequently seen at court and in Paris. Shortly after their creation, Cardinal Richelieu created a bodyguard unit for himself. So as not to offend the king with a perceived sense of self-importance, Richelieu did not name them Garde du Corps like the king's personal guards, but rather Musketeers after the Kings' junior guard cavalry. This was the start of a bitter rivalry between the two corps of Musketeers. At the cardinal's death in 1642, the company passed to his successor Cardinal Mazarin. At Mazarin's death in 1661, the Cardinal's Musketeers passed to Louis XIV, contrary to the wishes of both the King's Musketeers and the Cardinal's Musketeers themselves. The Musketeers were subsequently reorganized as a guard cavalry regiment of two companies. The King's Musketeers became the first company, popularly known as "Grey Musketeers" (mousquetaires gris), while the Cardinal's Musketeers became the second company, known as "Black Musketeers" (mousquetaires noirs) for riding grey and black horses, respectively. From their establishment, the musketeers wore blue cloak-like cassocks, lined with red and edged with silver embroidery. From 1688, the cassocks were replaced by smaller soubrevestes or sleeveless coats in the same colours. In the early decades of the corps, the musketeers had worn civilian dress under their cassocks, according to personal taste and means, but in 1677 a scarlet uniform was adopted.

In terms of recruitment, entry into the Musketeers was much sought after by those sons of the aristocracy who did not possess the quarterings of nobility required for the Garde du Corps and Chevau-legers. These two senior guard units were closed to all but the highest ranking and wealthy noble families. Accordingly for lesser gentry, or ambitious commoners, service in the Musketeers was the only way to join a mounted unit in the royal household and perhaps catch the King's eye. However, enlistment did require both letters of recommendation and evidence that a recruit had the family means to support the costs of service. These included the provision of horses, swords, clothing, a servant and equipment. Only the musket, the sleeveless soubreveste and the distinctive blue cassock were provided by the monarch.

In 1776, the Musketeers were disbanded by Louis XVI for budgetary reasons. Following the first Bourbon Restoration, the Musketeers were reestablished on 6 July 1814 along with the other military units of the former royal household. These expensive and aristocratic regiments proved ineffective when Napoleon returned from Elba, mostly dispersing, though some accompanied Louis XVIII into brief exile. Following the second restoration of the monarchy, the Musketeers were finally disbanded on 31 December 1815.

Decades later, starting in 1844, this group was the subject of the now-famous serial publication The Three Musketeers, first published in the magazine Le Siècle between March and July 1844. The author, Alexandre Dumas, père, based his work on the book Mémoires de Monsieur d'Artagnan, capitaine lieutenant de la première compagnie des Mousquetaires du Roi (Memoirs of Mister d'Artagnan, lieutenant captain of the first company of the King's Musketeers) by Gatien de Courtilz de Sandras (Cologne, 1700), a fictionalized account of the life of Charles de Batz de Castelmore d'Artagnan (c. 1611–1673). Other musketeers served as inspirations for some of the other characters. Isaac de Porthau (1617–1712) was the inspiration for Dumas's character Porthos. Jean-Armand du Peyrer, Comte de Troisville (1598–1672), was fictionalized as Monsieur de Tréville.

Other Musketeers include:

- Bénigne Dauvergne de Saint-Mars (died 1708), better known as the jailor of the Man in the Iron Mask
- Pierre de Montesquiou d'Artagnan (1640–1725), later a Marshal of France
- Jean-François Leriget de La Faye (1674–1731)
- Louis de Rouvroy, duc de Saint-Simon (1675–1755)
- Germain-François Poullain de Saint-Foix (1698–1776), later a writer and playwright
- Thomas de Treil de Pardailhan (1754–1822)
- François-Henri de Franquetot de Coigny (1737–1821), later a Marshal of France
- Alexandre de Beauharnais (1760–1794), first husband of the future Empress Josephine
- Charles Sevin de Quincy (1660–1738), sous-brigadier des mousquetaires noirs (1689), later lieutenant-general and historian

=== Netherlands ===
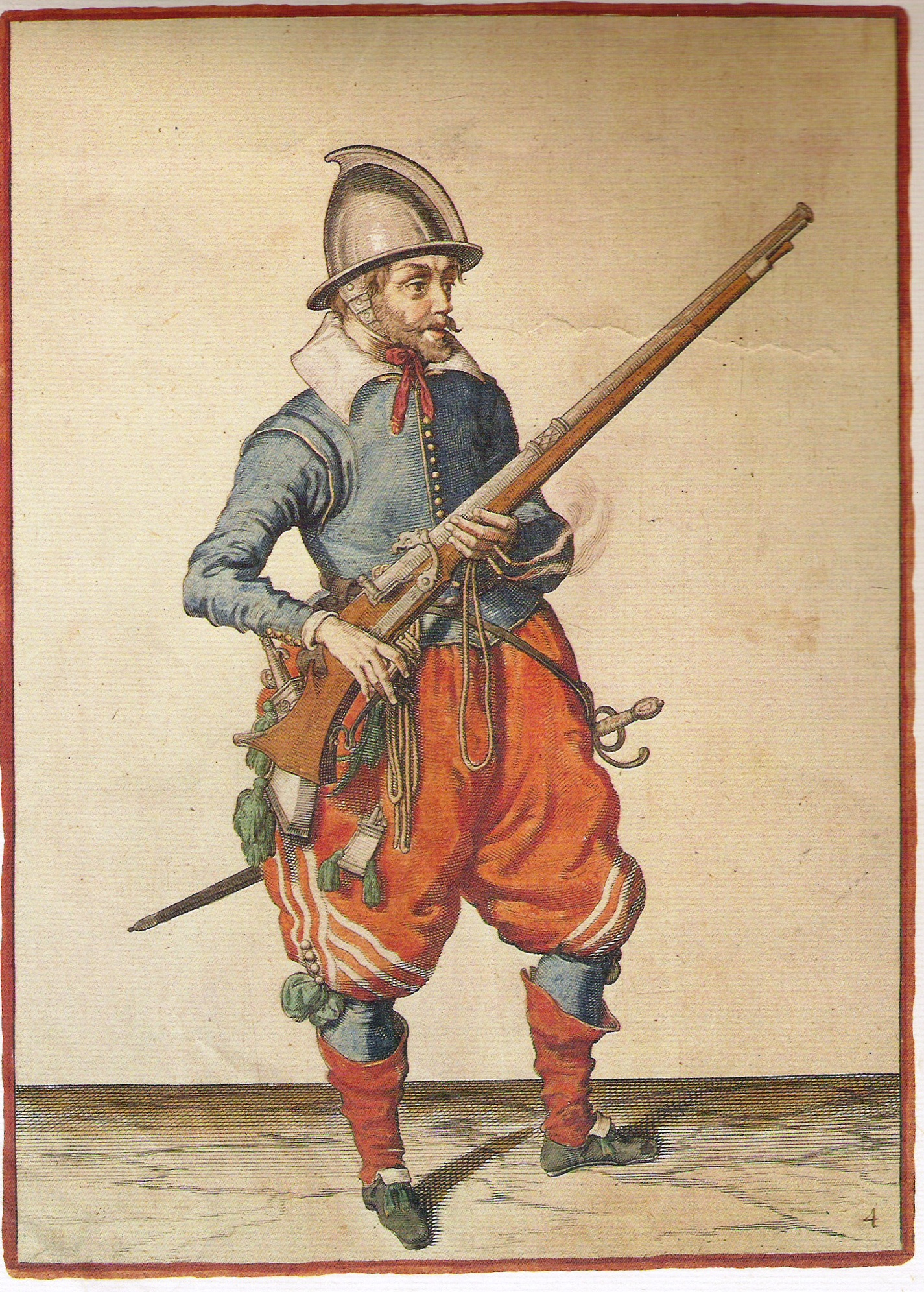
1608 engraving of a Dutch musketeer

Muskets began to appear in the Netherlands in the mid-16th century, during a time of growing conflict between the Dutch provinces and Spanish rule. These early firearms were matchlock muskets, which required a burning match to ignite the gunpowder. The Dutch rebels, also known as the Geuzen, adapted muskets for their guerrilla tactics during the early phases of the Eighty Years' War. A pivotal figure in the development of musket tactics in the Netherlands was Maurice of Nassau, the Dutch military commander and prince who led the Dutch forces during much of the war. By the late 17th century, musket technology continued to evolve, with flintlock mechanisms gradually replacing the older matchlock designs. The Dutch military adapted these newer technologies but also faced increasing challenges from other European powers like France and England.

=== Sweden ===
Thanks to the reforms of Gustav II Adolf, the Swedish Army brought to maturity the new style of fighting that made Sweden into a great power in the 17th century. This style of fighting became the new standard throughout Europe and its colonies in the latter stages of musket dominated warfare. Manuals based on Gustav's own revolutionised the training and tactics of western armies.

=== Britain ===
A musketeer of the English Army's 28th Foot in 1694

English armies started using musketeers during the Tudor era. By the early 18th century, the infantry of the British Army were equipped with the .75 calibre Land Pattern Musket, better known by the nickname of "Brown Bess", which had been introduced in 1722. He was well trained by the standards of the time, training with live ammunition. A fully trained British soldier could fire four times a minute. This, combined with the technique of firing by companies (a method wherein blocks of men fired smaller volleys in succession, creating a wave of fire down the front of the regiment), made it possible for the British musketeer to win pitched battles against superior numbers.

The term "musketeer" was rarely used in the titles of regiments. Examples include the 106th Regiment of Foot (Black Musqueteers), the 110th Regiment of Foot (Queen's Royal Musqueteers) and the 112th Regiment of Foot (King's Royal Musqueteers), all of which were raised in 1761 and disbanded in 1763. The musket was withdrawn from service with the British Army in 1854, replaced by the muzzle-loading Minié rifle, which had an accurate range of over three times that of the Brown Bess which it replaced.

== Musketeers in Asia ==
=== Ottoman Empire ===
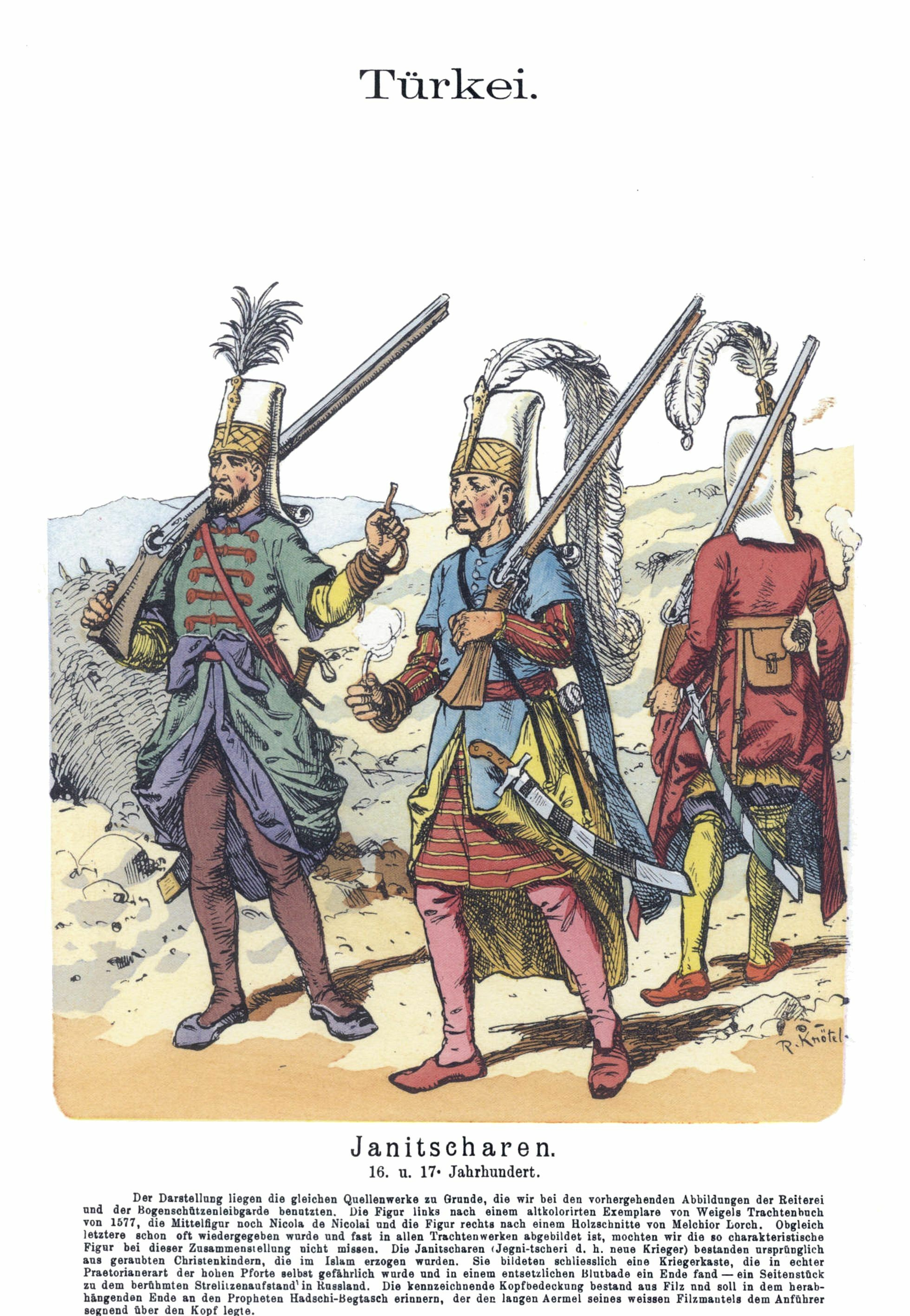
An illustration of Janissaries.

The Janissary corps of the Ottoman army were using matchlock muskets as early as the 1440s. The Ottoman Empire, centering on Turkey and extending into Balkans, Arabia and North Africa used muskets to conquer Constantinople (modern Istanbul) and were one of the earliest users of muskets in a military conflict. It also utilized large cannons, including the Great Turkish Bombard. The Ottomans, under Sultan Suleiman the Magnificent (r. 1520–1566), embraced these weapons to maintain military superiority against European rivals such as the Habsburgs and the Safavids. By the late 17th century, the Ottoman military began to face increasing difficulties in keeping up with the rapid advances in European military technology and tactics, particularly regarding firearms. The stagnation of the Ottoman military was evident during key conflicts such as the Great Turkish War (1683–1699) and the Siege of Vienna in 1683, where the Ottomans were defeated by the combined forces of the Holy Roman Empire and its allies.

During the 18th and 19th centuries, the Ottoman Empire recognized the need to modernize its military, particularly in the face of defeats at the hands of European powers. Several sultans, most notably Sultan Selim III (r. 1789–1807) and later Mahmud II (r. 1808–1839), attempted to reform the army and introduce more modern firearms, including newer versions of muskets with flintlock mechanisms. It wasn't until the reign of Mahmud II that the Janissaries were finally abolished in 1826, during the event known as the "Auspicious Incident." This paved the way for further military reforms, including the widespread adoption of modern muskets and rifles. By the mid-19th century, the Ottomans had restructured their military to be more in line with European standards, though the empire continued to struggle in keeping pace with technological advancements.

=== Iran ===
The Safavids, Afsharids, Zands, and Qajars in Iran employed musketeer corps called tofangchi. The tofangchis were numbered as high as 60,000 under Abbas the Great (1587–1629).

=== Russia ===
Streltsy (Russian: Стрельцы, sing. strelets, стрелец, literally "shooter"; often translated as "musketeer", but more properly "harquebusier") were the units of Russian guardsmen l from the 16th to the early 18th centuries, armed with firearms and bardiches. They are also collectively known as Strelets Troops (Стрелецкое Войско).

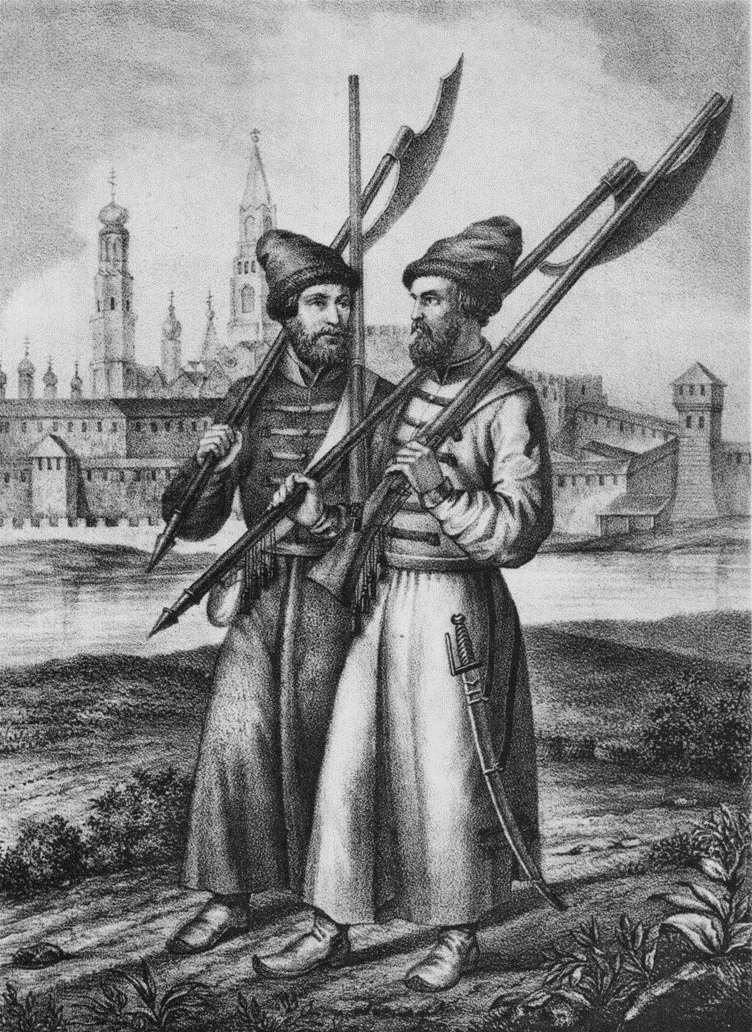
Streltsy in 1674

The first streltsy units were created by Ivan the Terrible sometime between 1545 and 1550 and armed with the arquebus. They first saw combat at the Siege of Kazan in 1552. Military service in this unit became lifelong and hereditary. The bearded streltsy were organized into regiments, each with a long coat (kaftan) and pointed cloth hat of a distinctive colour. By 1680, there were 20 regiments of Moscow streltsy totaling 20,048 men and comprising about 12 per cent of the total army (along with cossacks, militia and an increasing number of regular soldiers). In addition, there were significant numbers of frontier and garrison streltsy serving outside Moscow, although these were less formally drilled and equipped.

The Muscovite government was chronically short of cash so that the streltsy were often not paid well. While "entitled" to something like four rubles a year in the 1550s, they were often allowed to farm or trade in order to supplement their incomes. Textiles for clothing and foodstuffs were sometimes issued as part of their pay. A commander of one hundred musketeers (sotnik) received up to 20 roubles a year and a regimental head (streletski golova) between 30 and 60.

In the late 17th century, the Streltsy of Moscow began to actively participate in a struggle for power between different government groups, supporting dissidents and showing hostility towards any foreign innovations.

After the fall of Sophia Alekseyevna in 1689, the government of Peter the Great engaged in a process of gradual limitation of the streltsy's military and political influence. In order to counter their power, Peter began to raise a new regular army, still armed with muskets but disciplined, uniformed and organised along West European lines. In spite of these measures, the streltsy revolted yet again while Peter was on his Great Embassy in Europe. The four regiments involved were disbanded and 1,200 of the mutineers were executed. The remainder were exiled, had their property confiscated and were banned from future military employment. The entire corps was technically abolished in 1689; however, after having suffered a defeat at Narva in 1700, the government retained some streltsy units in service.

Gradually, the streltsy were incorporated into the regular army. At the same time, the Tsarist government started to disband the Municipal Streltsy. Liquidation of the last streltsy units (by then social rather than military groups) was finally completed by 1728.

The Preobrazhensky and Semenovsky regiments of the Imperial Guard replaced the streltsy as the political and military force closest to the tsar.

=== China ===
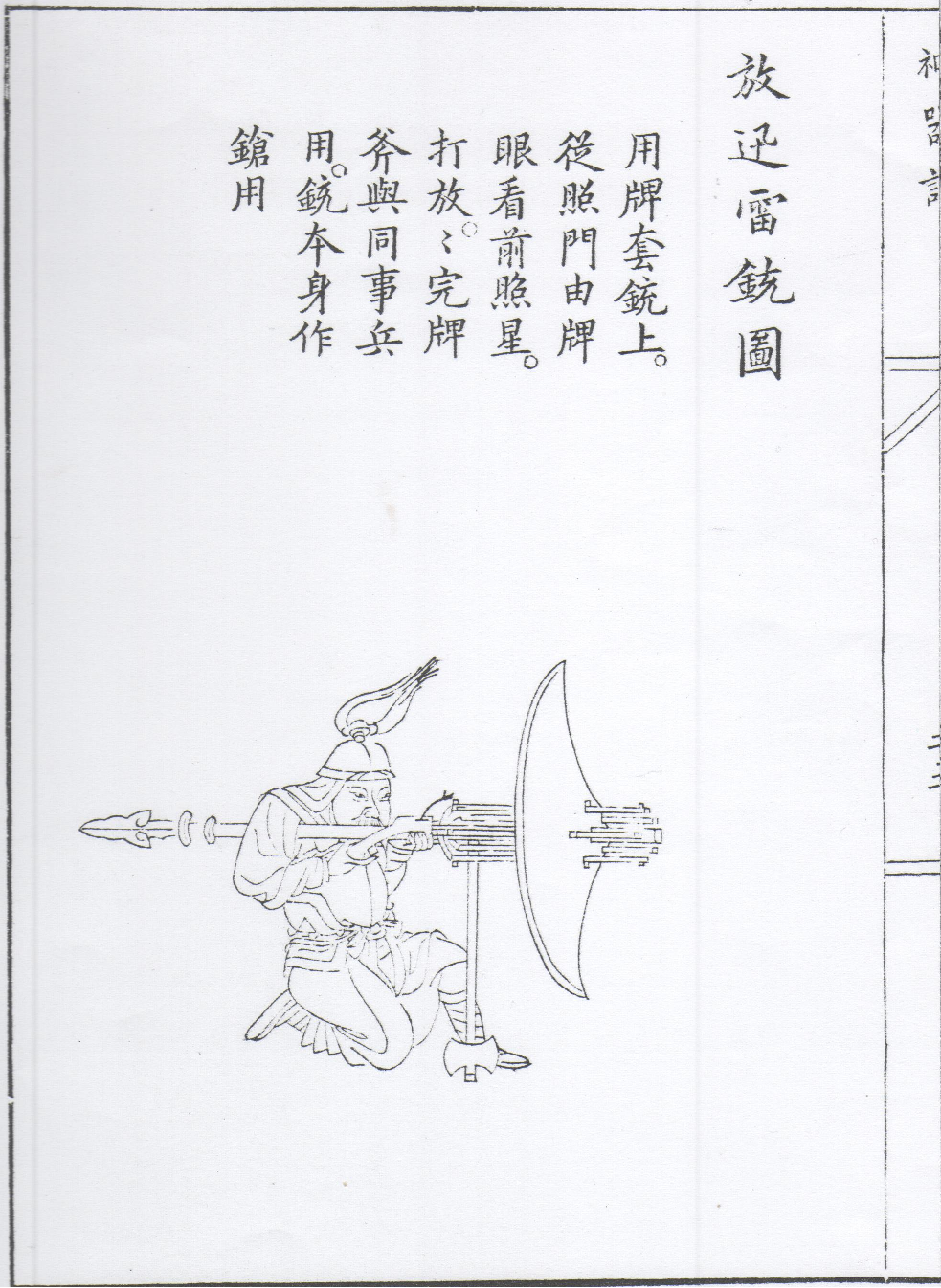
Ming gunman using multi barreled repeating firearm in 1598

Arquebusiers and musketeers were employed in the armies of the Ming (1368–1644) and Qing dynasties (1644–1911). Zhao Shizhen's book of 1598 AD, the Shenqipu, contains illustrations of Ottoman Turkish and European musketeers together with detailed diagrams of their muskets. There was also an illustration and description of how the Han people had adopted the Ottoman kneeling position when firing, while favoring the use of European-made muskets. The Han people also built the first repeating firearm: several barrels behind a small wooden shield. The gunman would turn these barrels lighting each barrel with a slow match one by one. These weapons were most effective when fired from walls or high positions. Needham considered this weapon to be a "primitive machine-gun".

=== Central Asia ===
Introduced by the Chinese, muskets were popularised in Central-Asia under the Timurid dynasty.

=== Indian Sub-continent ===
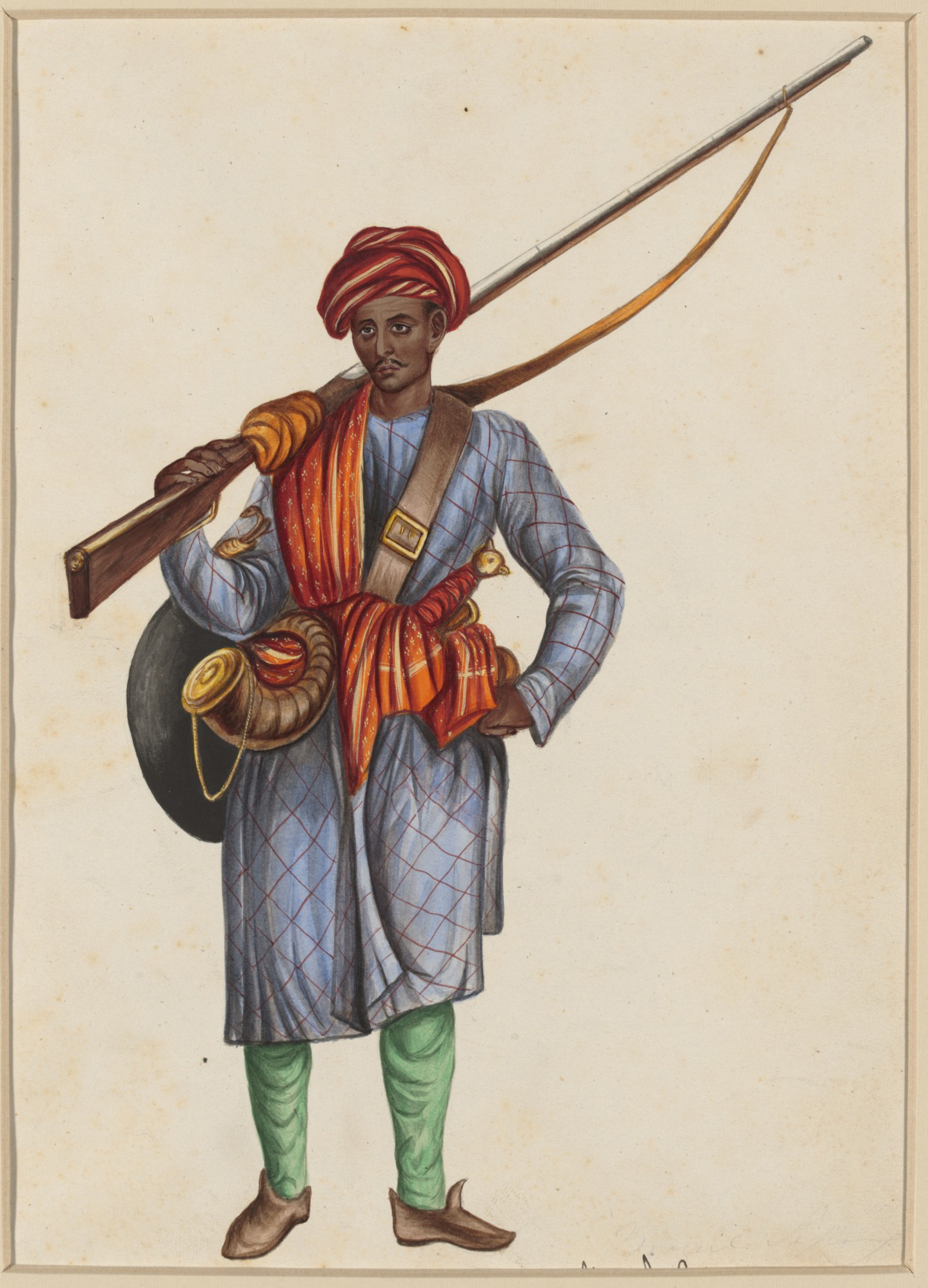
A painting of a Mughal infantryman.

Matchlock Muskets were first introduced by the first Mughal emperor Babur in the first Battle of Panipat 1526 CE. The weapon became an integral part of Indian warfare from the 16th century onward, mainly from the reign of the Mughal emperor Akbar. It was used as an effective defense against war elephants. The Mughals, Marathas, Rajputs, Sikhs and Ahoms made use of musketeers, firing from cover, to ambush opposing infantry, cavalry and elephants. Many Indian gunsmiths created matchlock muskets for the Mughal infantry plus some combination weapons.

== Africa ==
The Kingdom of Ndongo developed its musketeer forces in the 16th century amid war against the Portuguese in Angola. In 1585, 40 musketeers formed part of an attacking force deployed against Portugal. A small musketeer force was authorized in Kongo mostly made up of the mestiço, who were mixed race Kongolese with Portuguese ancestry. Over 300 musketeers served in the Kongo army against the Portuguese at the Battle of Mbwila in 1665. Musketeers were employed into the Wydah army from 1680 AD but they did not completely replace the spearmen, swordsmen and archers. In war, the Musketeers were first to go into action as they fought in the front ranks of the army.

== See also ==
- Fusilier
- Rifleman
- Pike and shot
- Line infantry
- Foot Guards

== Gallery ==
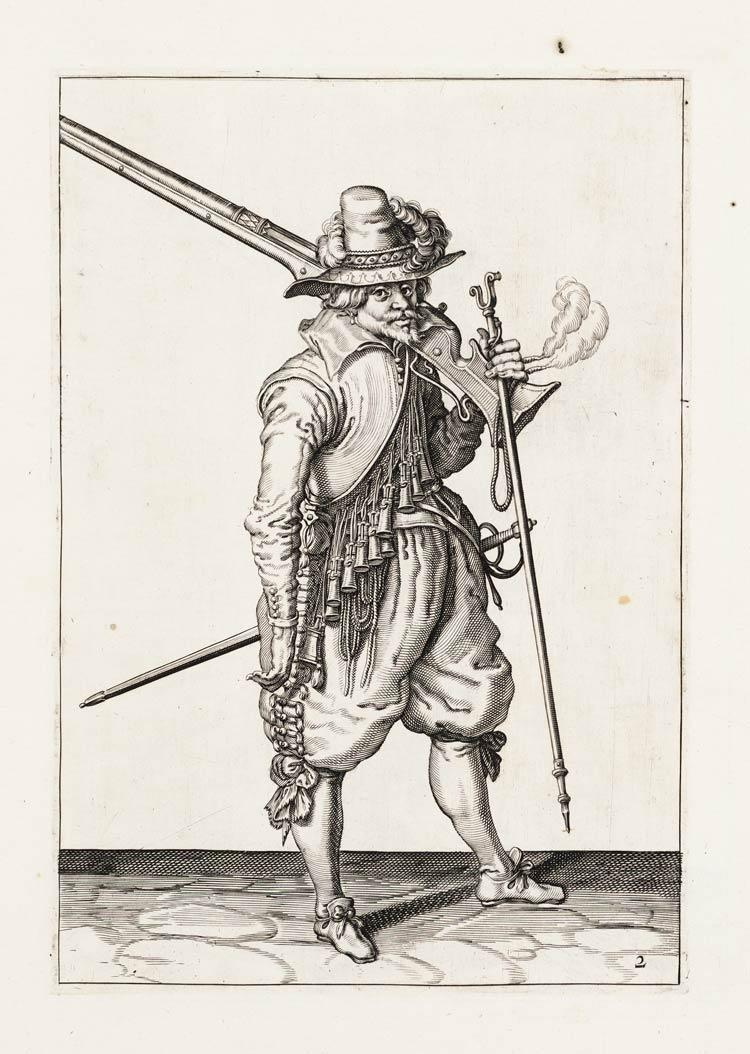

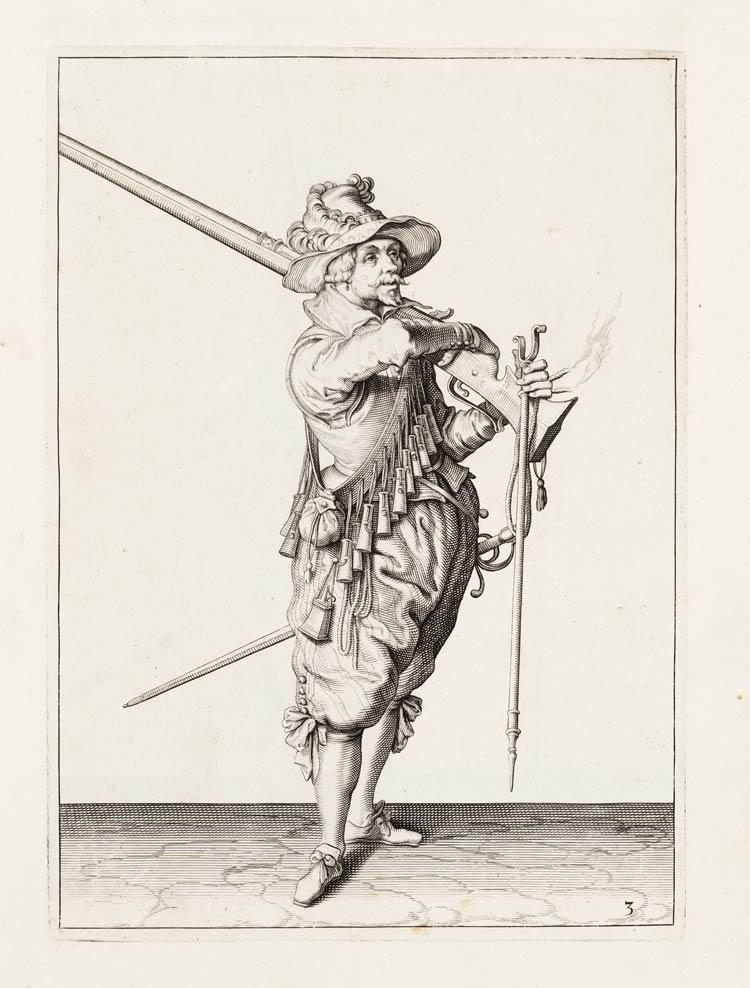

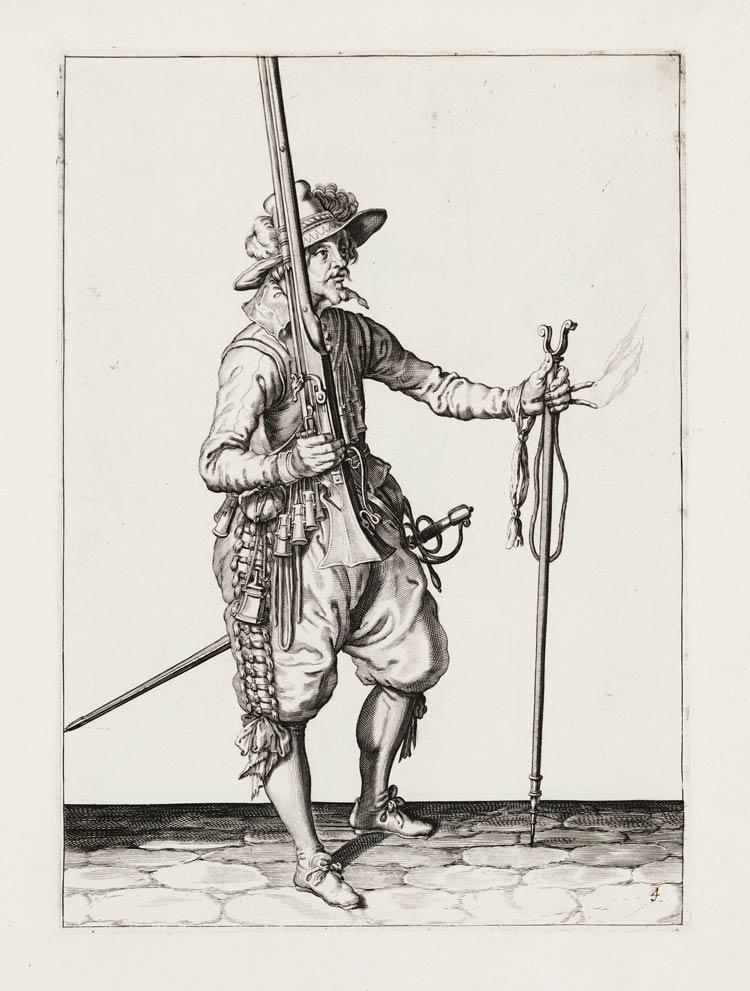

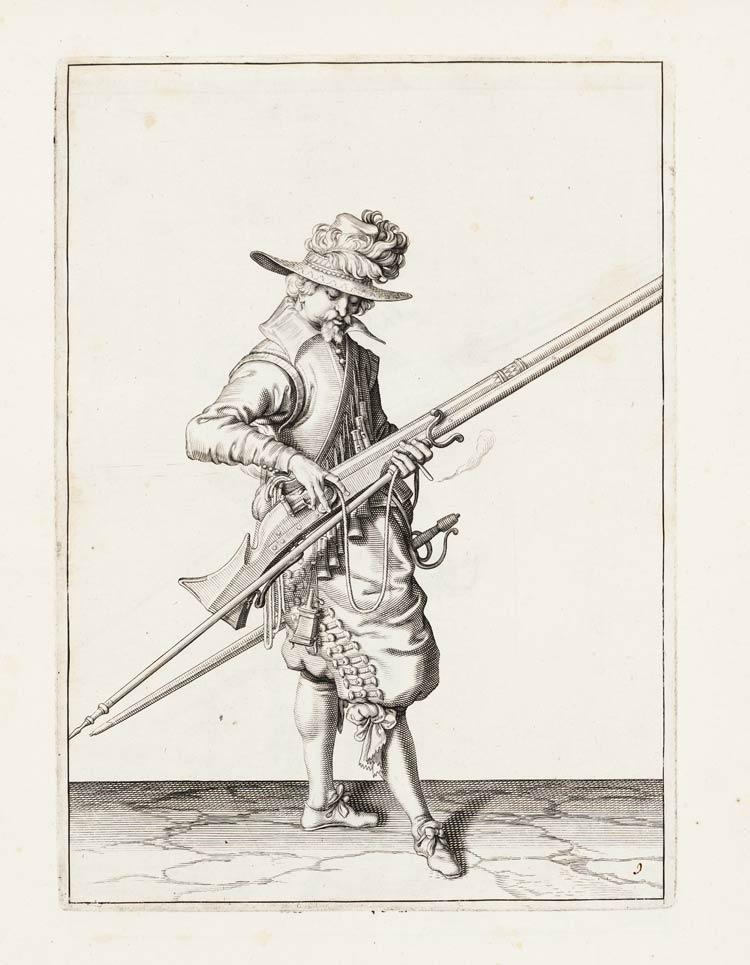

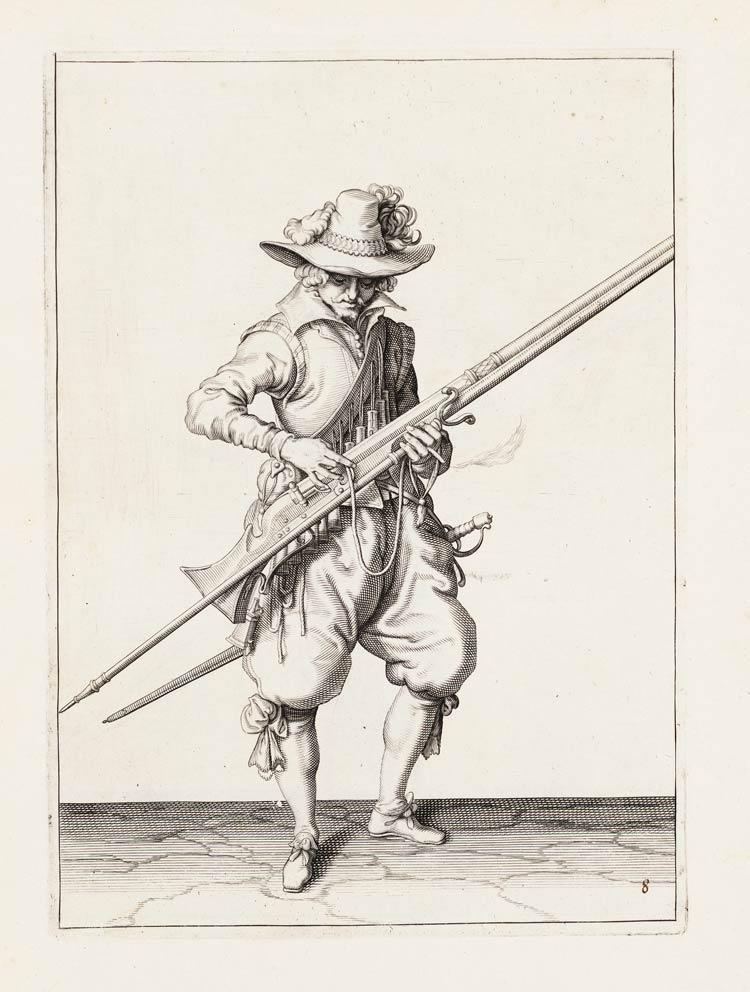

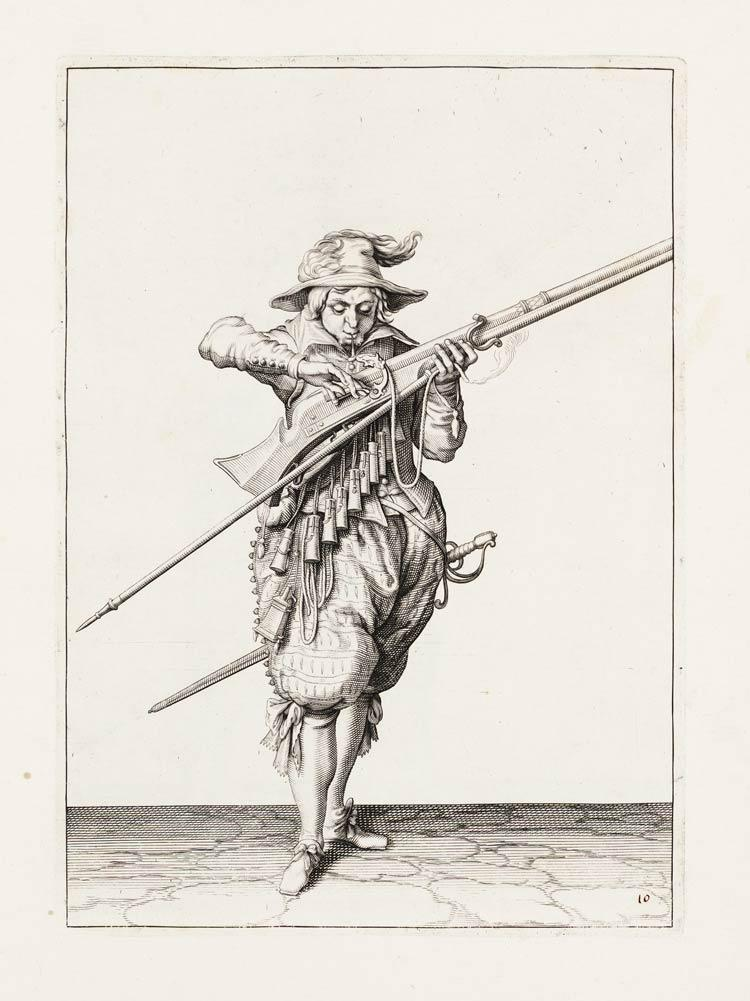

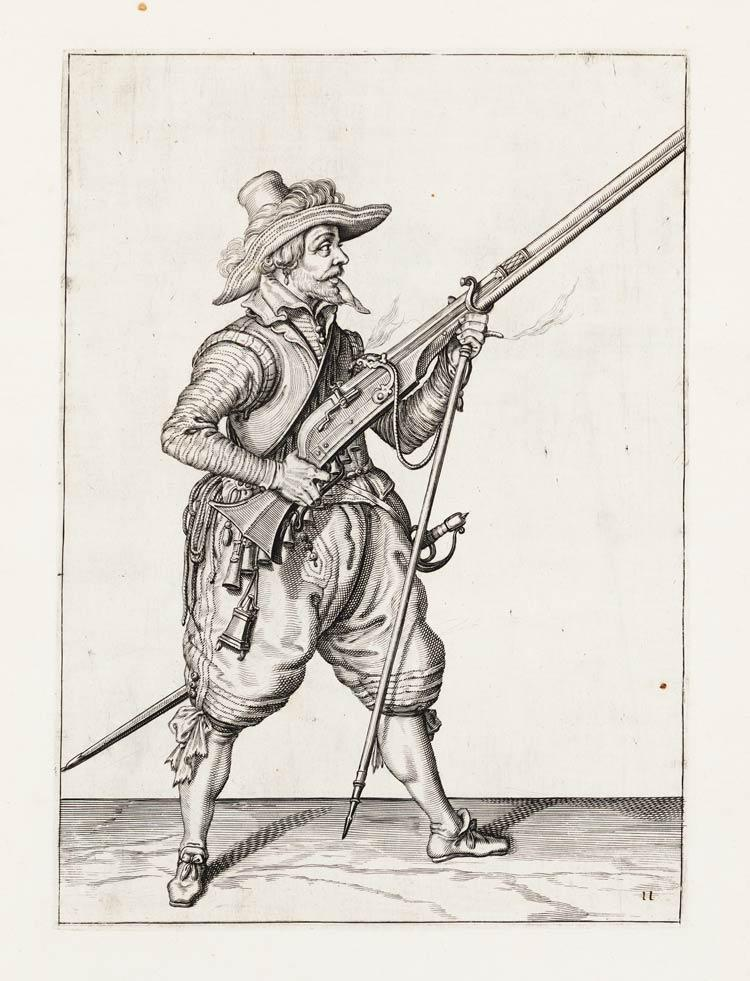

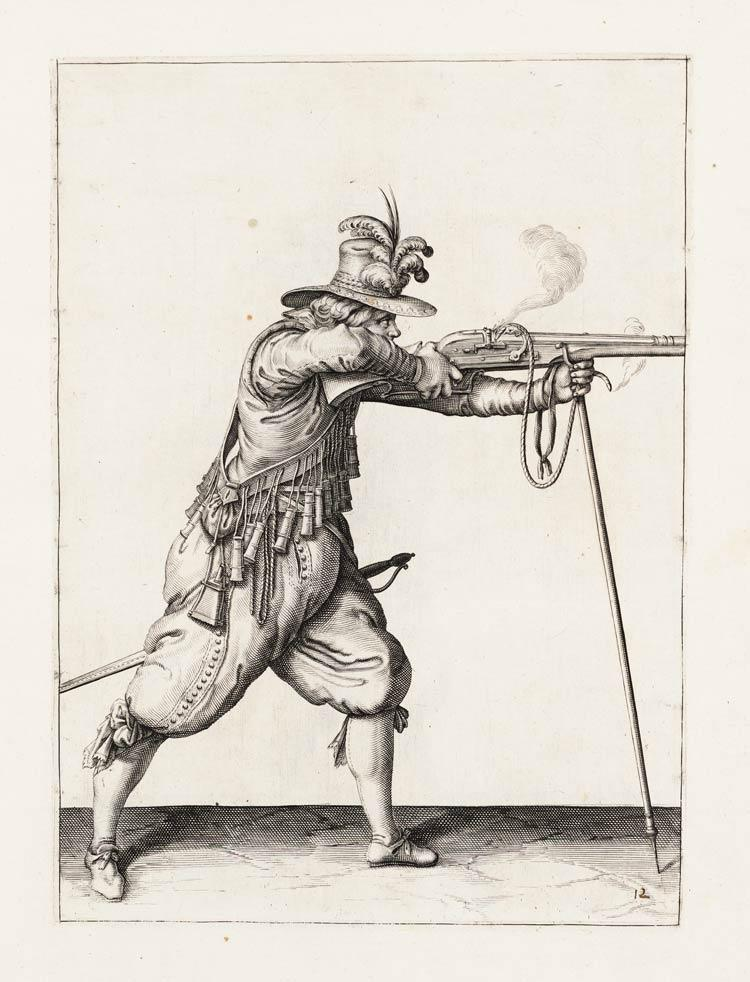

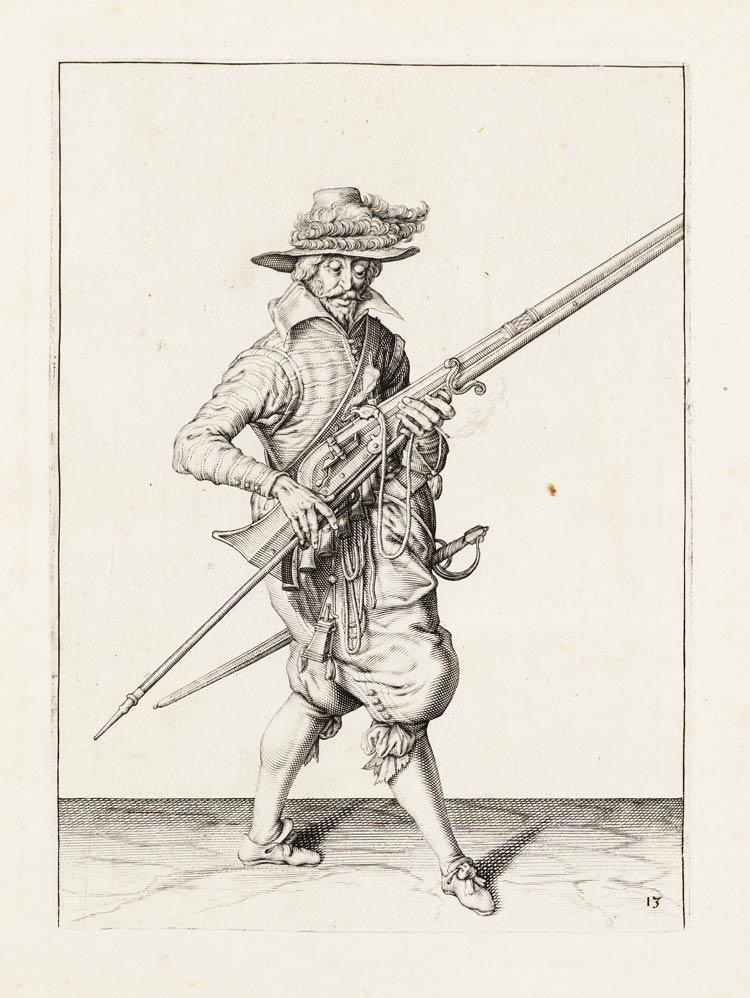

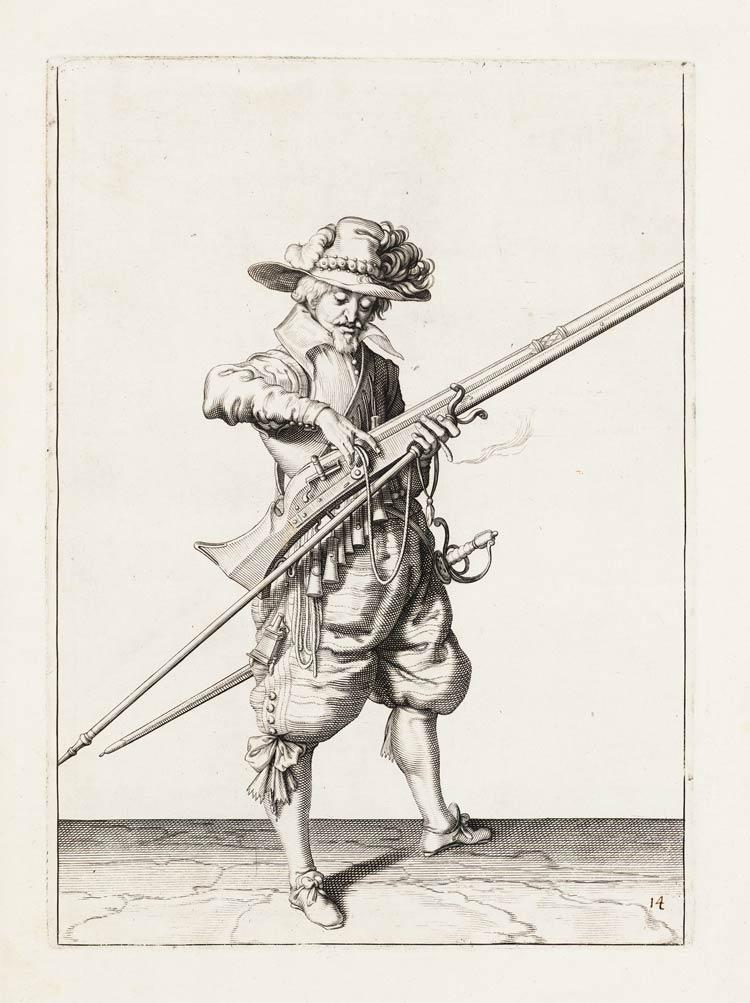

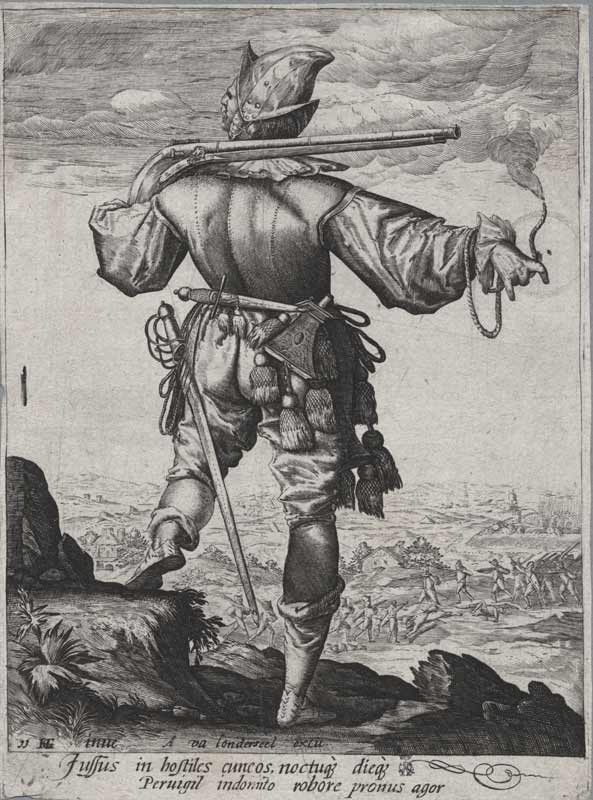

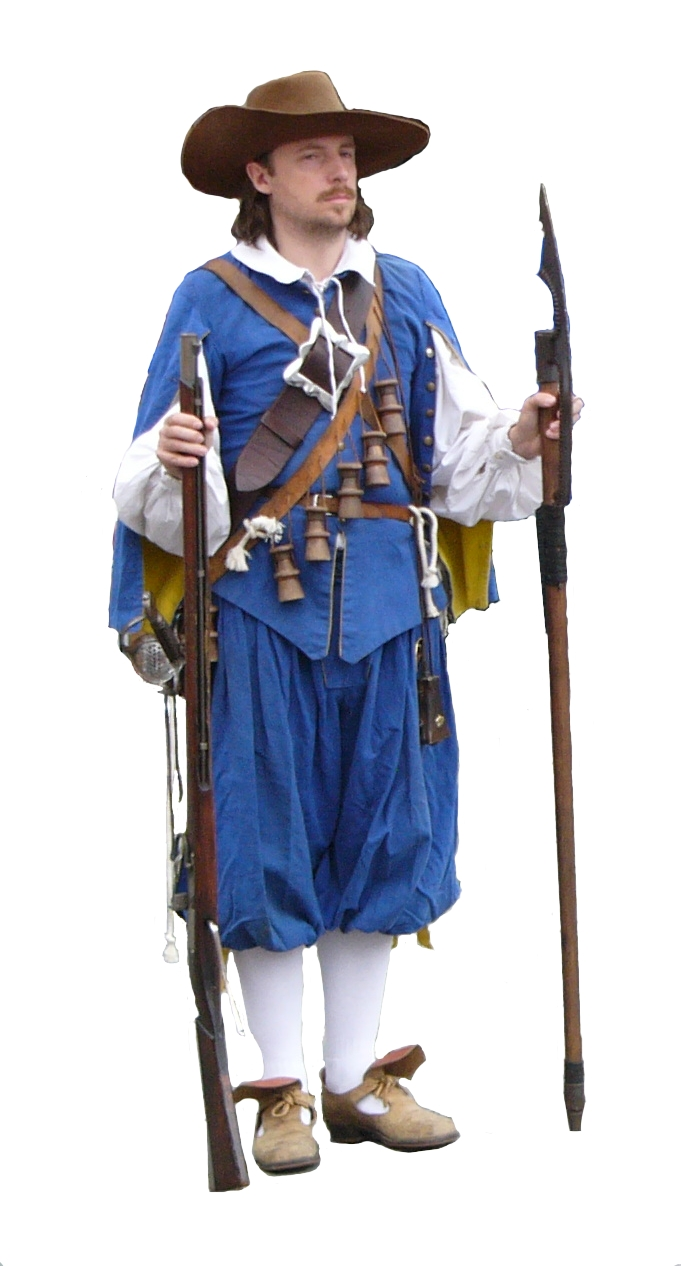
Musketeer from Altblau regiment (1624–1650) from Swedish army with musket and with bardiche (long poleaxe)

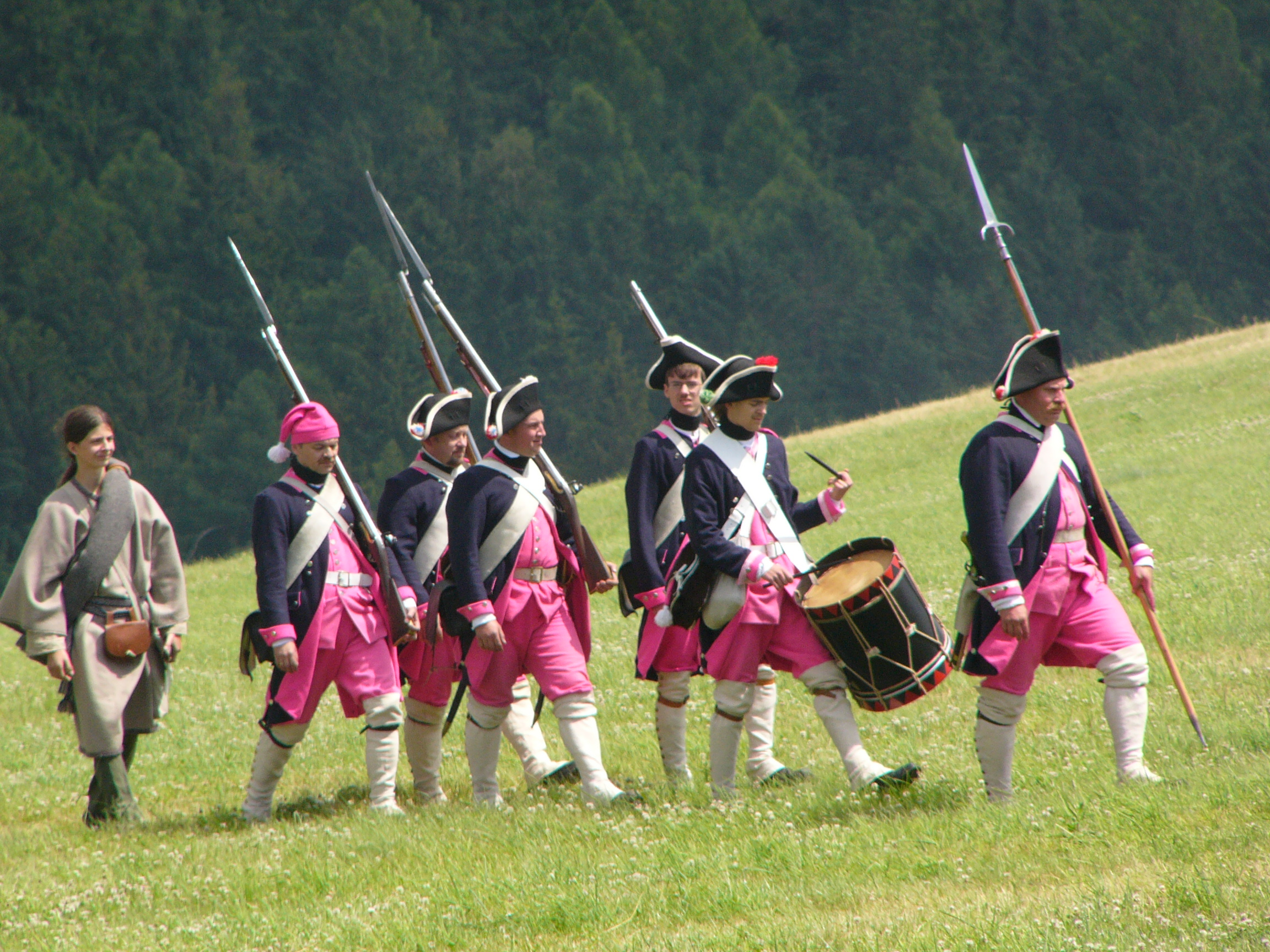
18th-century musketeers from Świdnica (reconstruction).

== Sources ==
- Chase, Kenneth Warren (2003). Firearms: A Global History to 1700 (illustrated, reprint ed.). Cambridge University Press. ISBN 0521822742.
- Needham, Joseph; et al. (1986). Science and Civilisation in China. Vol. 5, Part 7 Military Technology: The Gunpowder Epic. New York: Cambridge University Press.
