= Armand d'Athos =

Gascon Black Musketeer (c. 1615 – 1643)

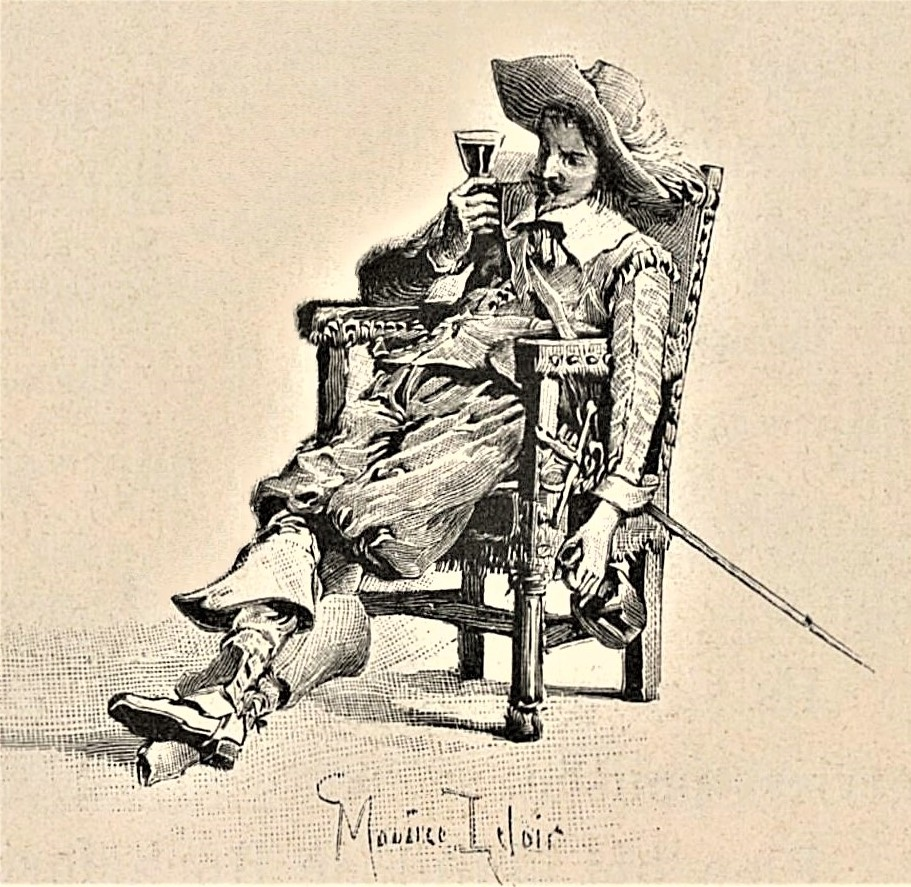
The character Athos

Armand, Seigneur de Sillègue, d'Athos, et d'Autevielle ("Lord of Sillègue, Athos, and Autevielle"), better known as Armand d'Athos (c. 1615 – December 21, 1643), was a Gascon Black Musketeer of the Maison du Roi in 17th-century France. He took his name from the small market town of Athos-Aspis on the Gave d'Oloron, close to Sauveterre-de-Béarn and Autevielle. Athos was the first cousin once removed to the Comte de Troisville and first cousin of Isaac de Porthau.

According to the semi-fictional Mémoires de M. d'Artagnan, he formed a close friendship with Henri d'Aramitz and the aforementioned de Porthau, and they were called the "three brothers". He served as the inspiration for Alexandre Dumas's character Athos in The d'Artagnan Romances.

== Life ==
Perhaps a nobleman, Athos was born in Béarn, France around 1615 to Seigneur Adrien de Sillègue d'Athos d'Autevielle de Cassaber and the sister of the Comte de Troisville.

According to the Mémoires of the Comte d'Artagnan, d'Artagnan saved Athos's life at the Pré aux Clercs. After joining the Musketeers of the Guard in 1640, Athos maintained his friendship with d'Artagnan.

Athos was killed in a duel on December 21, 1643, and was buried at the Pré aux Clercs near Paris.

== See also ==
- Athos (fictional character)
- Henri d'Aramitz
- Isaac de Porthau
