= Henri d'Aramitz =

French abbé and soldier (c. 1620 – 1655/1674)

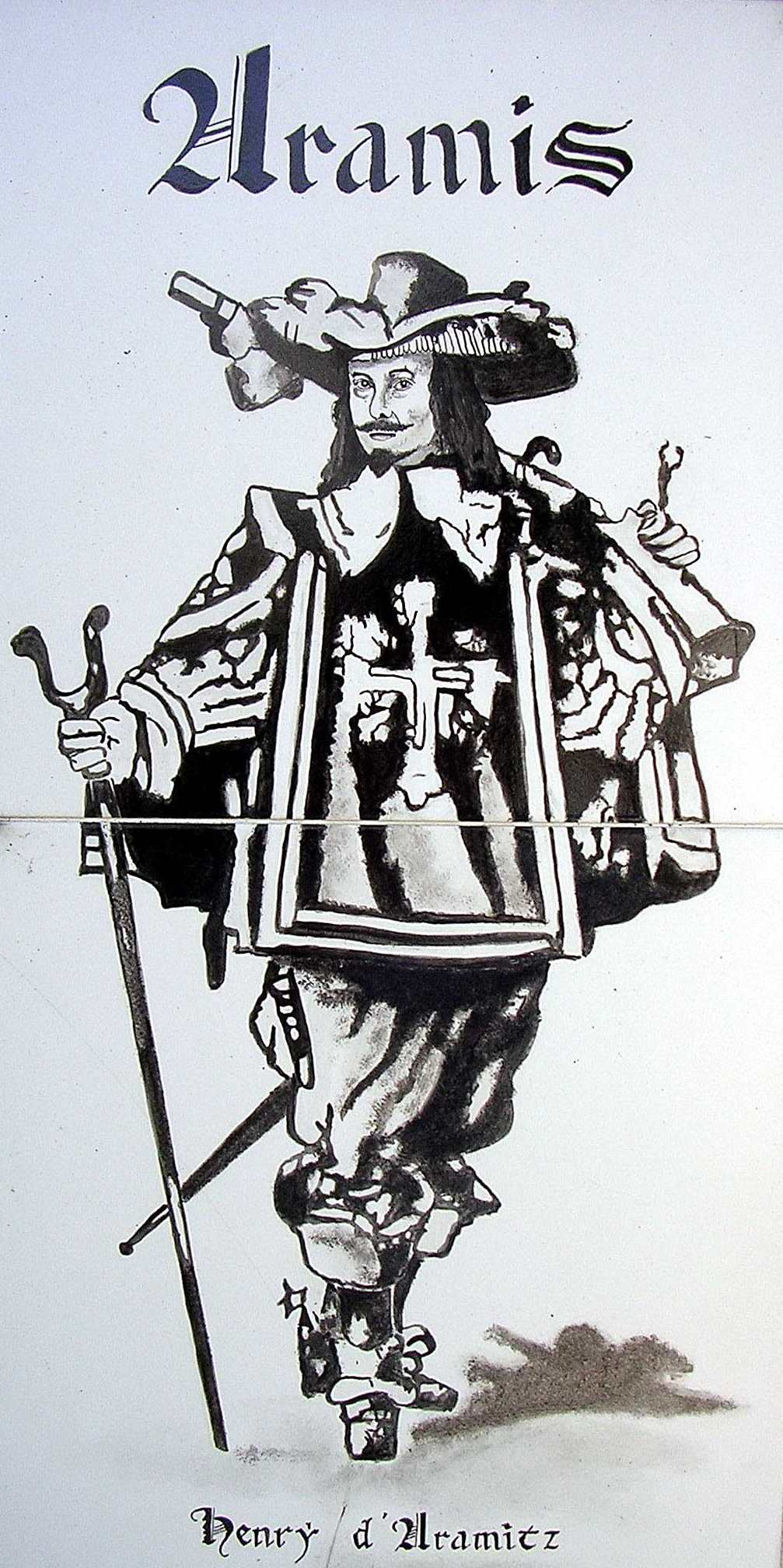

Henri, Seigneur d'Aramitz ("Lord of Aramits"; c. 1620 – 1655/1674) was a Gascon abbé, and black musketeer of the Maison du Roi in 17th century France. In addition, he was the nephew of the Comte de Troisville, captain of the Musketeers of the Guard. Aramitz served as the inspiration for Alexandre Dumas's character "Aramis" in the d'Artagnan Romances.

== Life ==
Aramitz was born of noble ancestry to Charles d'Aramitz and Catherine d'Espalungue de Rague in Béarn, France. His father lived in Paris as maréchal-des-logis for the Musketeers of the Guard, but upon the death of Henri's grandfather, Abbé Pierre d'Aramitz, Charles returned to Béarn and took over his father's abbacy. His grandfather was indeed a Huguenot captain, though there is no proof of Henri d'Aramitz being himself a Protestant (he married a devout Catholic).

Henri d'Aramitz's uncle, the Comte de Troisville, called him to Paris along with his cousins Armand d'Athos and Isaac de Porthau based on their reputation for swordsmanship. On this occasion Aramitz had the chance to meet the Comte d'Artagnan. The Mémoires de M. d'Artagnan, written by Gatien de Courtilz de Sandras, later served as the basis for Alexandre Dumas's novel The Three Musketeers. In May 1640 Aramitz joined the Musketeers of the Guard.

Aramitz married Jeanne de Béarn-Bonnasse on February 16, 1650 and had two sons (Clément and Amant) and one daughter. Following his father's death in 1648, he resigned from the Guard and took over as abbé of Béarn. Sources disagree on his date of death, recorded as either 1655 or 1674.

== See also ==
- Armand d'Athos
- Isaac de Porthau
