= Trois-Villes =

Trois-Villes Iruri (Basque)
- Commune
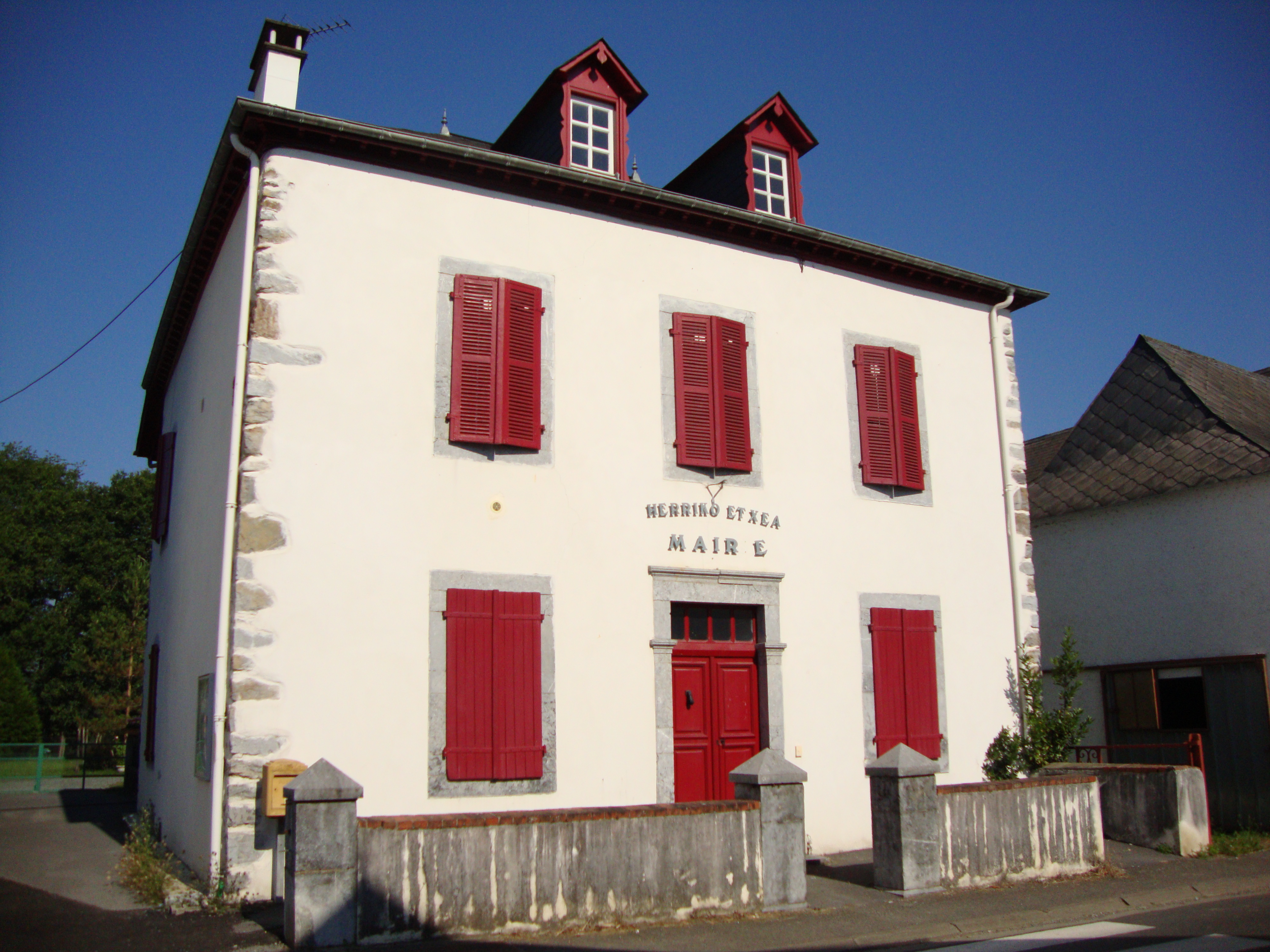
- The town hall of Trois-Villes
- Location of Trois-Villes
- Location within France Location within Nouvelle-Aquitaine
- Coordinates: 43°08′03″N 0°52′32″W
- Country: France
- Region: Nouvelle-Aquitaine
- Department: Pyrénées-Atlantiques
- Arrondissement: Oloron-Sainte-Marie
- Canton: Montagne Basque
- Intercommunality: CA Pays Basque

Government
  - Mayor (2020–2026): Jean Etchemendy
- Area^{1}: 6.39 km^{2} (2.47 sq mi)
- Elevation: 300 m (980 ft)
- Highest elevation: 793 m (2,602 ft)
- Lowest elevation: 195 m (640 ft)
- Population (2023): 148
  - Density: 23.2/km^{2} (60.0/sq mi)
- Time zone: UTC+01:00 (CET)
  - Summer (DST): UTC+02:00 (CEST)
- INSEE/Postal code: 64537 /64470
- ^{1} French Land Register data, which excludes lakes, ponds, glaciers > 1 km^{2} (0.386 sq mi or 247 acres) and river estuaries.

Trois-Villes (French: [tʁwɑ vil]; literally "Three Cities"; Basque: Iruri; Occitan: Tres Vilas) is a commune in the department of Pyrénées-Atlantiques in the Nouvelle-Aquitaine Region of south-western France.

The French military officer Comte de Troisville was a major landowner in this village.

It is located in the former province of Soule.

== See also ==
- Communes of the Pyrénées-Atlantiques department
