= Athos-Aspis =

- Commune
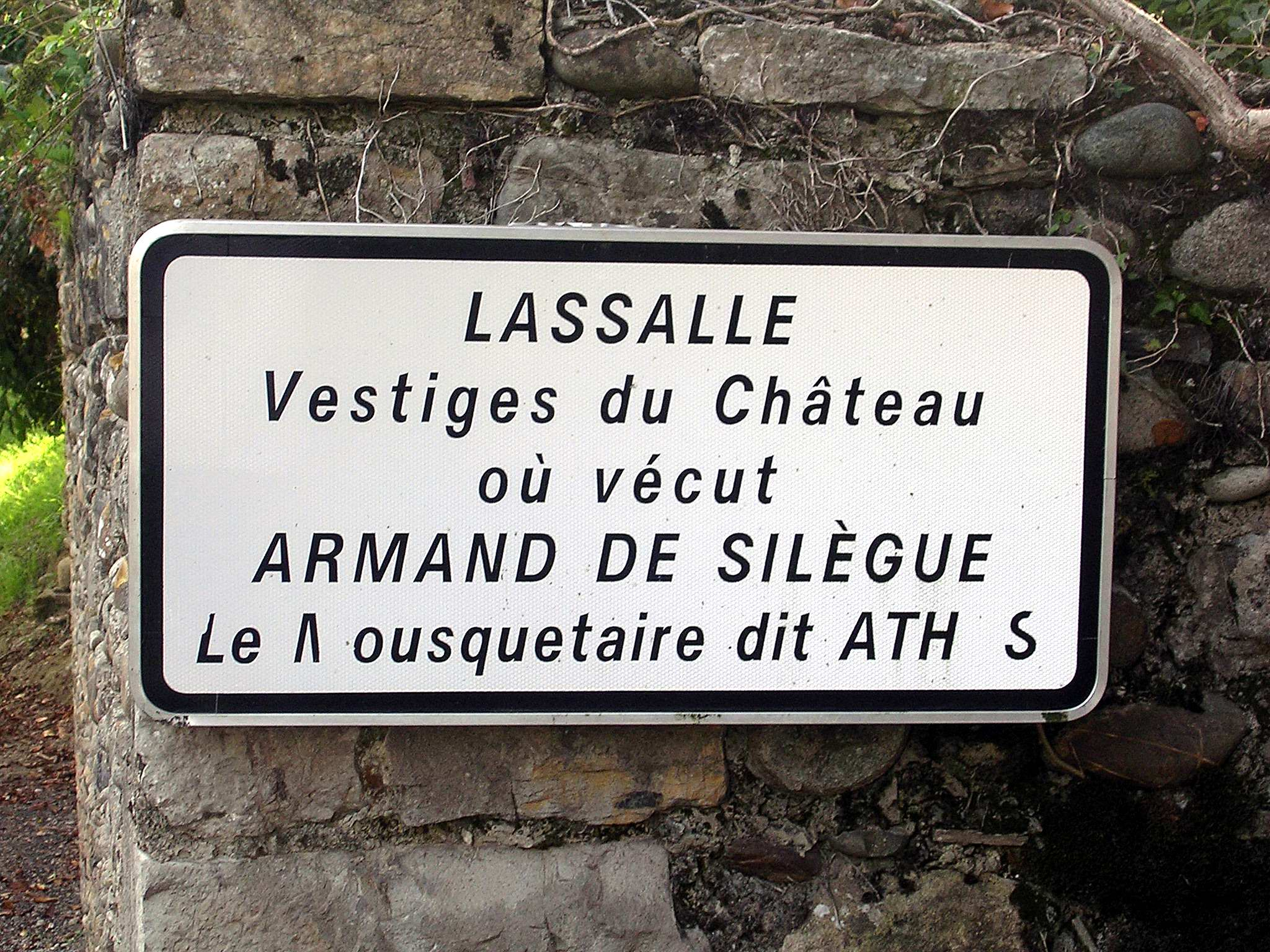
- Remains of the Chateau, home of the original Athos of the Three Musketeers
- Location of Athos-Aspis
- Location within France Location within Nouvelle-Aquitaine
- Coordinates: 43°24′53″N 0°58′20″W
- Country: France
- Region: Nouvelle-Aquitaine
- Department: Pyrénées-Atlantiques
- Arrondissement: Oloron-Sainte-Marie
- Canton: Orthez et Terres des Gaves et du Sel
- Intercommunality: CC Béarn Gaves

Government
  - Mayor (2020–2026): Jean-Robert Lataillade
- Area^{1}: 6 km^{2} (2.3 sq mi)
- Elevation: 80 m (260 ft)
- Highest elevation: 141 m (463 ft)
- Lowest elevation: 33 m (108 ft)
- Population (2023): 213
  - Density: 35/km^{2} (92/sq mi)
- Time zone: UTC+01:00 (CET)
  - Summer (DST): UTC+02:00 (CEST)
- INSEE/Postal code: 64071 /64390
- ^{1} French Land Register data, which excludes lakes, ponds, glaciers > 1 km^{2} (0.386 sq mi or 247 acres) and river estuaries.

Athos-Aspis (French pronunciation: [atɔs aspis]; Occitan: Atòs e Aspins) is a commune in the Pyrénées-Atlantiques department, in the Nouvelle-Aquitaine region of south-western France.

== Geography ==
Athos-Aspis is located immediately to the north-west of Sauveterre-de-Béarn, and just east of Abitain. Access to the commune is by the D27 road from Sauveterre-de-Béarn, passing through the east of the commune and going north to Oraas. Access to the village can be by several country roads from the D27, including Arriouteque going to Lespitaou and also the Village road. Apart from the village, there is the hamlet of Aspis in the south of the commune. There are also significant forests in the east of the commune with the rest of the farmland.

The Gave d'Oloron forms the whole southern and eastern borders of the commune as it flows north to join the Gave de Pau at Peyrehorade. The Arriouyeque flows from the east of the commune through the centre to join the Gave d'Oloron on the western border. The Ruisseau de Rance rises just east of the commune and flows south-west to join the Arriouteque. The Arrec Heure forms most of the northern border of the commune as it flows west to join the Gave d'Oloron at the north-western corner of the commune.

=== Places and hamlets ===
- Aspis
- Athos
- Bouchou
- Cabé
- Les Camous
- La Campagne
- La Campagnole
- Castet
- Cossou
- Couteigt
- Desbos (barns)
- Esperben
- Gabirot
- Garampoey
- Les Garbas
- Gué
- Hau
- Herrou
- Héuré (mill)
- Houssas
- Labourdette
- Lapeyrigne
- Lapisque
- Lavielle
- Mina (côte de)
- Mouliède
- Mousquères
- Natou
- Peyrou
- Poun Agnès
- Pys
- Rioutèque
- Sarrecaute
- L'Usine

== Toponymy ==
The commune name in béarnais is Atos-Aspins.

For Athos Michel Grosclaude proposed the patronym Ato with the Aquitaine suffix -ossum. For Aspis Michel Grosclaude proposed a Gascon etymology es pins meaning "the pines".

The following table details the origins of the commune name and other names in the commune.

Name	Spelling	Date	Source	Page	Origin	Description
Athos	Atos	11th century	Raymond	16	Marca	Village
	Atos	1119-1136	Grosclaude		Cartulary	
	Sent Per d'Atos	1472	Raymond	16	Notaries	
	Atos	1745	Grosclaude		Notaries	
	Athos	1750	Cassini			
	Atos	1790	Cassini2			
Aspis	Espis	1119-1136	Orpustan		Cartulary	Village
	Espis	1385	Raymond	15	Census	
	Espiis	1544	Raymond	16	Reformation	
	Aespiis	1546	Raymond	16	Reformation	
	Spiis	1548	Raymond	16	Reformation	
	Aspis	1750	Cassini			
Cabé	la maison deu Cabee	1538	Raymond	38	Reformation	Fief (Vassal of the Viscounts of Béarn)
	lo Caver d'Atos	1538	Raymond	38	Reformation	
	lo Caber	1548	Raymond	38	Reformation	
Pys	Piis-Jusoo	1385	Raymond	140	Census	Fief (Vassal of the Viscounts of Béarn)
	Piis-Susoo	1385	Raymond	140	Census	
	Dues maysons aperades los Piis	1538	Raymond	140	Reformation	
Rioutèque	L'arriu de Ariuteca	1538	Raymond	142	Reformation	Stream
	Le Riutèque	1863	Raymond	142		
La Salle	La Salle d'Athos	1385	Raymond	154	Census	Fief (Vassal of the Viscounts of Béarn)
	La Sala d'Athos	1538	Raymond	154	Reformation	
Sarrecaute	Sarrecaute	1385	Raymond	156	Census	Farm
	Serracaute	1614	Raymond	156	Reformation	

Sources:

- Raymond: Topographic Dictionary of the Department of Basses-Pyrenees, 1863, on the page numbers indicated in the table. (in French)
- Grosclaude: Toponymic Dictionary of communes, Béarn, 2006 (in French)
- Orpustan: Jean-Baptiste Orpustan, New Basque Toponymy
- Cassini: Cassini Map from 1750
- Cassini2: Cassini Map from 1790

Origins:

- Marca: Pierre de Marca, History of Béarn.
- Cartulary: Cartulary of the Abbey of Saint-Jean de Sorde
- Notaries: Notaries of Labastide-Villefranche
- Census: Census of Béarn
- Reformation: Reformation of Béarn

== History ==
Paul Raymond noted on page 16 that in 1385 Athos had 19 fires and depended on the Bailiwick of Sauveterre as did the fief of Aspis as noted on page 15.

The villages of Athos and Aspis were united into one commune on 10 January 1842.

During the Reformation the Priest at Athos was murdered in his church and the village adopted the new ideas.

Athos is the birthplace of Athos, one of the title characters in the novel The Three Musketeers by Alexandre Dumas. The fictional Athos is named after the historical musketeer Armand de Sillègue d'Athos d'Autevielle (1615–1644), youngest son of Adrien de Sillègue, Lord of Athos and Autevielle. Autevielle is another nearby village in the commune of Autevielle-Saint-Martin-Bideren.

== Administration ==
List of Successive Mayors

From	To	Name
1995	2008	Jean-Robert Lataillade
2008	2014	Jean-Michel Peyruseigt
2014	2026	Jean-Robert Lataillade

=== Inter-communality ===
The commune is part of five inter-communal structures:

- the inter-communal centre for social action of Sauveterre-de-Béarn;
- the Communauté de communes du Béarn des Gaves;
- the inter-communal association for rivers and of Saleys;
- the AEP association of Sauveterre-de-Béarn;
- the Energy association of Pyrénées-Atlantiques;

== Demography ==
Historical population

Year	Pop.	±% p.a.
1793	416	—
1821	515	+0.77%
1846	438	−0.65%
1872	337	−1.00%
1901	325	−0.12%
1926	290	−0.45%
1946	236	−1.02%
1962	209	−0.76%
1968	213	+0.32%

Year	Pop.	±% p.a.
1975	203	−0.68%
1982	201	−0.14%
1990	197	−0.25%
1999	203	+0.33%
2007	181	−1.42%
2012	187	+0.65%
2017	211	+2.44%
2023	213	+0.16%

Source: EHESS and INSEE

From 1793 to 1836 the communes of Athos and Aspis were separate but the above table shows the total for both communes during that period.

== Economy ==
Economic activity is mainly agricultural. The commune is part of the Appellation d'origine contrôlée (AOC) zone of Ossau-iraty.

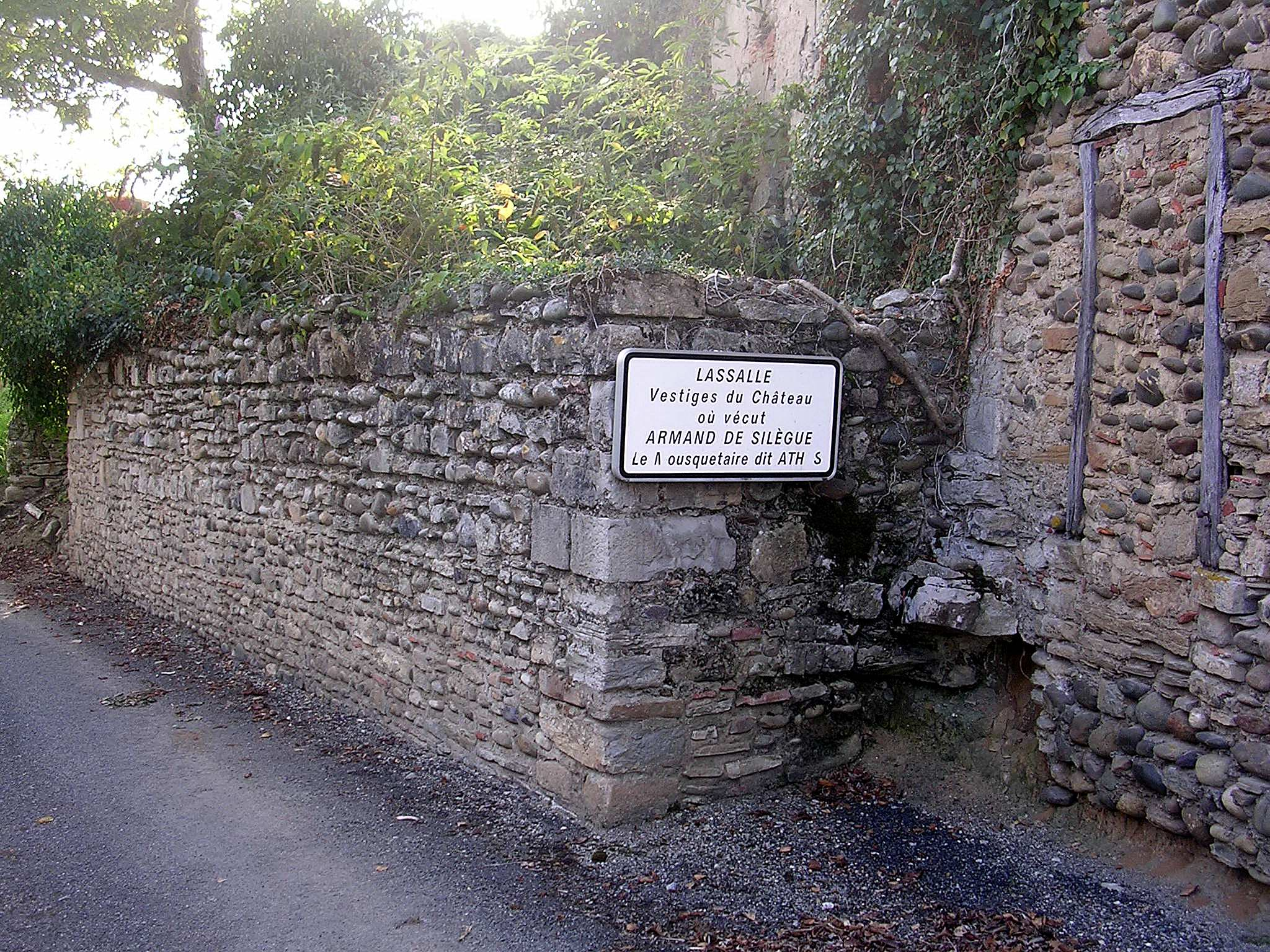
Remains of the Château of Athos-Aspis, where the musketeer Athos lived

== Culture and heritage ==
=== Civil heritage ===
There are the houses of Lascampagnes, the consul Gourlat, and of Bouchoô the place where Monsigneur Bouchoô was born.

Aspis has a château from the 14th century facing the Gave d'Oloron with a terrace and a door to the garden. There is also the site of an old church and the old school.

At Athos there is a church of Romanesque origin in the old fief of Moliède d'Athos where there was a well-known ferry and ruins of a mill.

=== Religious heritage ===
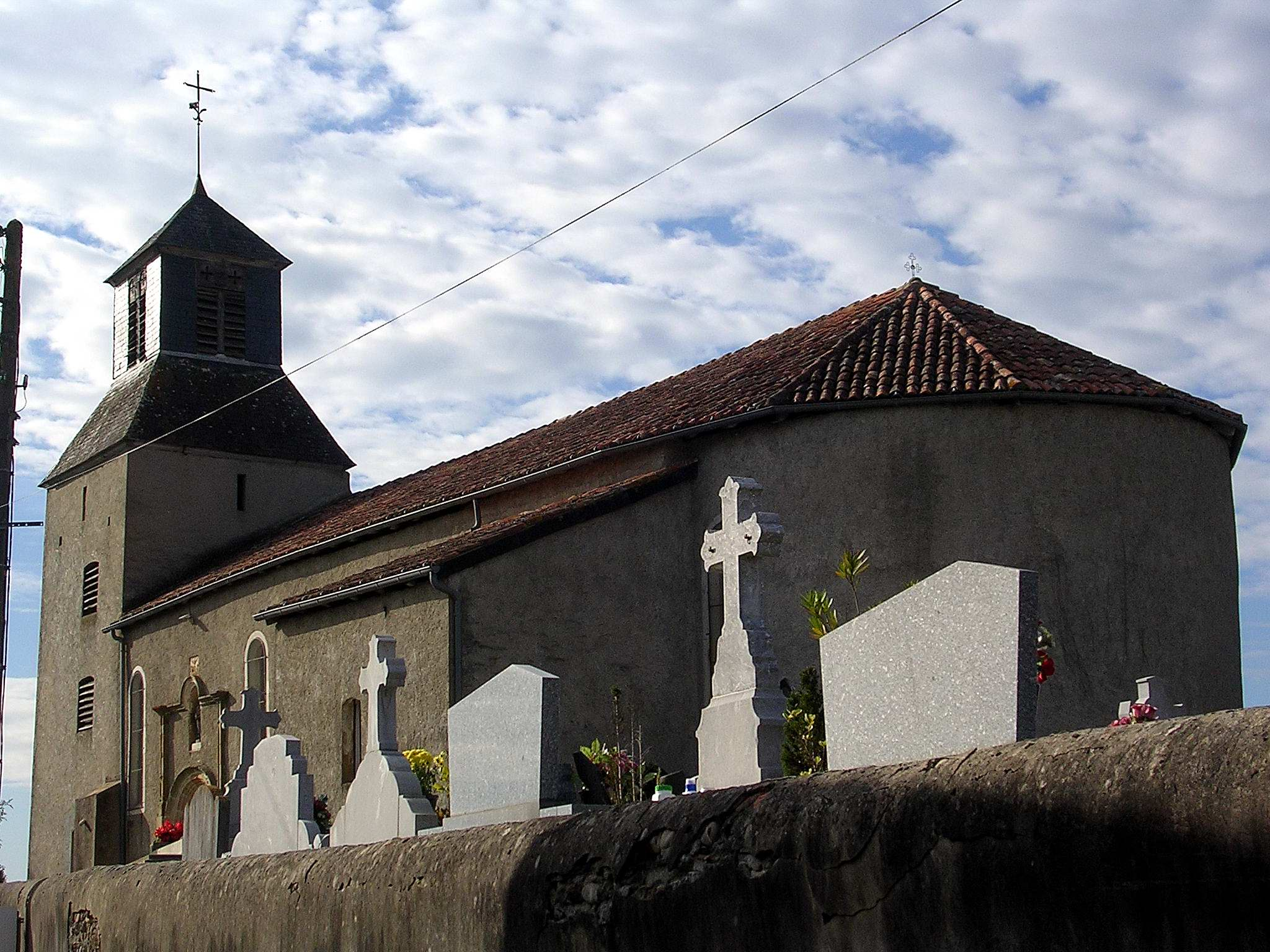
Church of Saint-Pierre

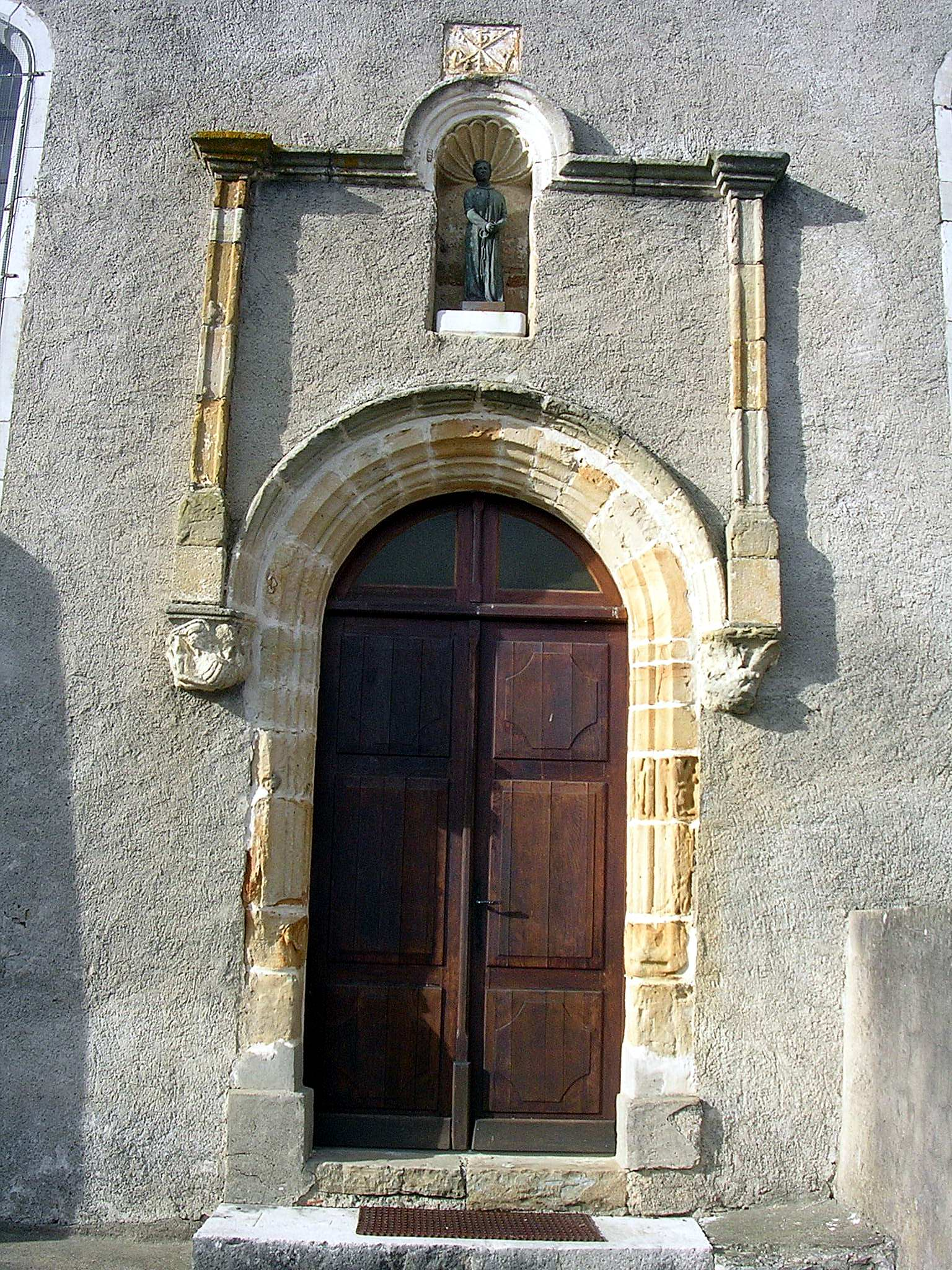
Entrance to the church

The Church of Saint-Pierre is of Romanesque origin and contains a renaissance stoup and a Statue on the Virgin in coloured wood. Behind the Altar is the tomb of Jeanne du Peyrer "Lady of Athos and Aspis" and mother of the musketeer. The renaissance door has a stone carving from the 14th century upside down (it was probably a stone that was reused).

The cemetery has the tomb of the design engineer of the Sauveterre bridge and also that of Edmond Gourlat, consul of France and local personality.

== Notable people linked to the commune ==
The birth of the musketeer Athos in the commune is debatable. A plaque near the church says that he was born in the Lassalle house where only parts of walls remain but the village of Autevielle also claims his birth in the fortified house of Moliède d'Athos which has some remains of strong walls.

Athos was the birthplace of Jean-Baptiste Boucho, born in the Bouchoô house in 1797, French Apostolic vicar of the Malay Peninsula.

== Bibliography ==
- History of Athos and Aspis, Alexis Ichas (in French)

== See also ==
- Communes of the Pyrénées-Atlantiques department

=== External links ===
- Athos-Aspis on Géoportail, National Geographic Institute (IGN) website (in French)
- Athos and Aspis on the 1750 Cassini Map
