= Isaac de Porthau =

Gascon Black Musketeer

Isaac de Porthau (also Portau or Portaut; January 30, 1617, Pau – July 13, 1712) was a Gascon black musketeer of the Maison du Roi in 17th century France. In addition, he was the first cousin once removed of the Comte de Troisville, captain of the Musketeers of the Guard (the captain of the musketeers could only be the king himself), and first cousin of Armand d'Athos. Porthau served as the inspiration for Alexandre Dumas's character "Porthos" in the d'Artagnan Romances.

== Life ==
Born in Béarn to Isaac de Porthau de Camptort de Campagne de Castetbon (Secretary of the Parliament of Béarn) and Clémence de Brosser, as the eldest of four children: Jean, Jeanne, and Sarah. Some sources say he was merely a guard while his brother Jean was the black musketeer, and may be in part responsible for the fictional representations of Porthau.

Porthau served in the company of Alexandre des Essarts, cousin of the Comte de Troisville, before joining the Musketeers of the Guard in 1642. He had two sons: Arnaud and Jean.

Following his father's death in 1654, he resigned from the Guard and took over as Secretary of the Parliament of Béarn.

== Pedigree and arms ==
According to an issue of Macmillan's Magazine from 1899:

The Porthaus were an ancient family of Béarn, taking their name from one of the old porthaux or portes (small frontier towers resembling the peel-towers of the British Border) with which the French and Spanish Pyrénées were studded.

Clearly the Porthaus accepted this interpretation of their name, since the blazon of their arms (without tinctures, as the source is a seal) was: A lion rampant and in chief two towers crenellated, masoned and inflamed, one to the dexter and the other to the sinister.

These arms were granted to the Porthaus on November 24, 1674. It is unrecorded what, if anything, their arms were prior to this date.

== See also ==
- Armand d'Athos
- Henri d'Aramitz
