= Comte de Troisville =

French military officer (1598–1672)

Jean-Armand du Peyrer
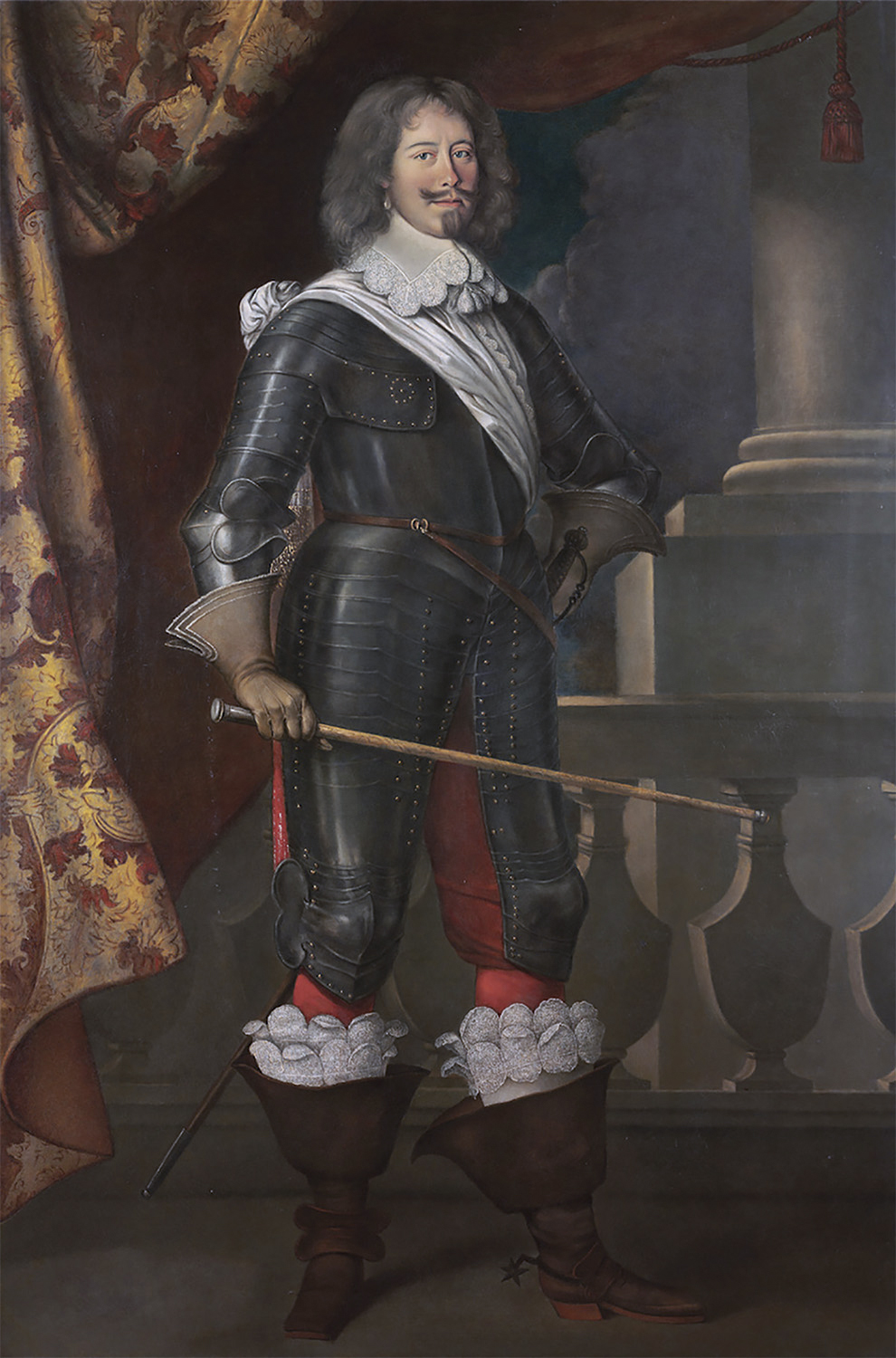
- Portrait of the Comte de Tréville by Le Nain, which had been hanging in the salon of Troisvilles Castle near to Tardets. Sold by 1954 in Paris, this portrait is now in private collection.
- Born: 1598; Oloron-Sainte-Marie, Bearn, Gascony, France
- Died: May 8, 1672 (aged 73–74); Trois-Villes, Soule, France
- Spouse: Anne de Guillon des Essarts
- Children: Armand Jean; Joseph Henry
- Relatives: Armand d'Athos (first cousin); Isaac de Porthau (brother-in-law); Henri d'Aramitz (first cousin)
- Military career
- Allegiance: Kingdom of France
- Branch: French Royal Army
- Service years: 1616 – 1646
- Rank: Captain
- Nicknames: Comte de Troisville; Tréville; Monsieur de Tréville (Note: in Alexandre Dumas' novel)
- Commands: King's Musketeers
- Known for: Being captain of the Muskeeters
- Conflicts: French Wars of Religion; Siege of La Rochelle; Thirty Years War

3rd Captain of the King's Musketeers
- In office 1634–1646
- Monarchs: Louis XIII; Louis XIV
- Regent (Note: During the minority age of Louis XIV): Anne of Austria
- Chief Minister: Cardinal Richelieu; Cardinal Mazarin
- Secretary of State of the Maison du Roi (Note: Under the authority of Maison militaire du roi de France): Antoine de Loménie; Henri-Auguste de Loménie; Henri de Guénégaud
- Secretary of State for War: Abel Servien; François Sublet; Michel Le Tellier
- Preceded by: Jean de Vieilchastel
- Succeeded by: Position abolished Philippe Jules Mancini (1657)

Jean-Armand du Peyrer, Comte de Troisville (or Tresville) (1598 – 8 May 1672) was a French officer. He was fictionalised under the name Monsieur de Tréville in Alexandre Dumas's 1844 novel The Three Musketeers.

== Biography ==
=== Origins ===
Du Peyrer was born at Oloron-Sainte-Marie. He was not from aristocratic stock, but of recent nobility. It was his father, Jean du Peyrer, who introduced the name de Trois-villes or Tréville into the family. In 1607 he bought the region of Trois-Villes which effectively brought him nobility, according to the customs of the Basque Country at the time. This purchase also allowed the elder Du Peyrer the right to be considered a gentleman and to sit upon the council of gentlemen in the viscountcy of Soule. He died at Trois-Villes.
