= Gatien de Courtilz de Sandras =

French novelist and journalist (1644–1712)

Gatien de Courtilz de Sandras (1644 – 8 May 1712) was a French novelist, journalist, pamphleteer and memorialist.

His abundant output includes short stories, gallant letters, tales of historical love affairs (Les Intrigues amoureuses de la Cour de France, 1684), historical and political works, biographies and semi-fictional "memoirs" (in the first person; his prefaces often indicate that the works were composed of papers found after the subject's death) of historical figures from the recent past (such as the Marquis de Montbrun and M. de Rochefort). His memoir-novels (Mémoires de M.L.C.D.R., 1687; Mémoires de M. d'Artagnan, 1700; Mémoires de M. de B.; 1711) describe the social and political world of Richelieu and Mazarin with a picaresque realism (spies, kidnappings, and political machinations predominate) and they were important precursors to both French picaresque novels and literary realism in the 18th century.

Courtilz de Sandras is best known today for his semi-fictionalized memoirs of the famous musketeer d'Artagnan which were published in 1700 (27 years after the death of d'Artagnan) and which served as the model for Alexandre Dumas, père's portrayal of d'Artagnan in The Three Musketeers (Fr: Les trois mousquetaires), Twenty Years After (Fr: Vingt ans après) and The Vicomte de Bragelonne (Fr: Le Vicomte de Bragelonne ou Dix ans plus tard).

Courtilz de Sandras served in the army before becoming a writer. He was imprisoned several times in the Bastille where Besmaux, the former companion of d’Artagnan, was warden, and it was most likely from this source that he learned the details of d'Artagnan's life.
