= Musketeers of the Guard =

Royal guard of the King of France (1622–1816)

Mousquetaires de la Garde
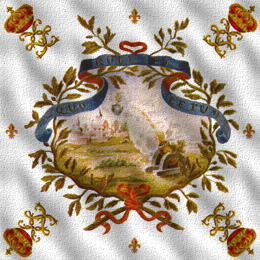
- Flag of the 1st Company of the Musketeers of the Guard, 1715.
- Founded: 1622
- Disbanded: 1816
- Country: Kingdom of France
- Allegiance: King of France
- Part of: Maison militaire du roi de France
- Mottos: Latin: Quo ruit et lethum, English: Where the company rushes is into disaster

The Musketeers of the military household of the King of France (French: Mousquetaires de la maison militaire du roi de France or compagnie des mousquetaires du roi), also known as the Musketeers of the Guard (Mousquetaires de la garde) or King's Musketeers (Mousquetaires du roi), were an elite fighting company of the military branch of the Maison du Roi, the royal household of the French monarchy.

== History ==
They were founded in 1622 when Louis XIII furnished a company of light cavalry (the carabins, created by Louis' father Henry IV) with muskets. The Musketeers fought in battles both on foot (infantry) and on horseback (cavalry). They formed the royal guard for the king while he was outside of the royal residences (within the royal residences, the king's guard was the Garde du corps and the Gardes suisses). The Musketeers of the Guard wore an early type of military uniform with a tabard (known as soubreveste), indicating that they "belonged" to the King, and an embroidered white cross denoting the fact that they were formed during the Huguenot rebellions in support of the Catholic cause.

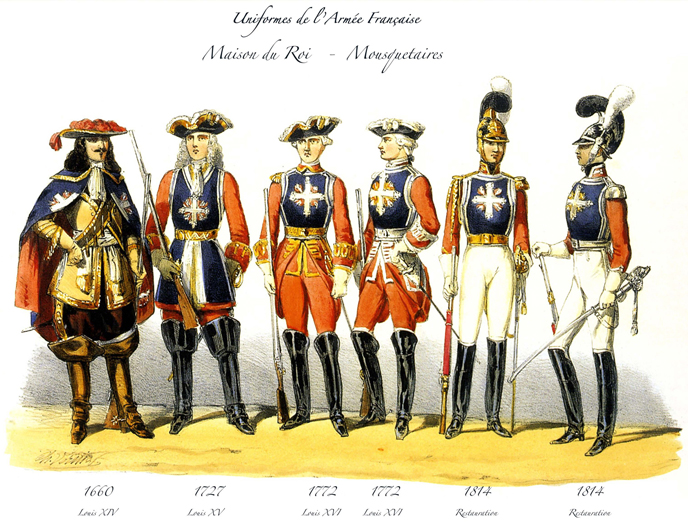
Uniforms of Musketeers of the Guard, 1660–1814

Shortly after the Musketeers were established, a second company was founded to report to Cardinal Richelieu. At the cardinal's death in 1642, the company passed to his successor Cardinal Mazarin, who disbanded his Musketeers in 1646. He revived the Musketeers in 1657 with a company of 150 men. Upon Mazarin's death in 1661, the cardinal's Musketeers passed to Louis XIV.

In 1664, the two companies were reorganized: one company took the name "Grey Musketeers" (mousquetaires gris) from the color of their matched horses, while the second were called "Black Musketeers" (mousquetaires noirs), mounted on black horses. At roughly the same time, the size of the Musketeer companies was doubled.

The Musketeers were among the most prestigious of the military companies of the Ancien Régime, and in principle membership in the companies was reserved for nobles. With the reforms of Michel le Tellier – which mandated a certain number of years of military service before nobles could attain the rank of officer – many nobles sought to do this service in the privileged Musketeer companies.

In 1776, the Musketeers were disbanded by Louis XVI for budgetary reasons. Reformed in 1789, they were disbanded again shortly after the French Revolution. They were reformed on 6 July 1814 and definitively disbanded on 1 January 1816.

== Notable Musketeers of the Guard ==
The following are some of the notable Musketeers:

- Charles de Batz de Castelmore d'Artagnan (the historical basis of Alexandre Dumas' character d'Artagnan in his 1844 novel The Three Musketeers)
- Henri d'Aramitz (the historical basis of Dumas' character Aramis in The Three Musketeers)
- Armand d'Athos (the historical basis of Dumas' character Athos in The Three Musketeers)
- Isaac de Porthau (the historical basis of Dumas' character Porthos in The Three Musketeers)
- Jean-Armand du Peyrer de Troisville (the historical basis of Dumas' character Monsieur de Tréville in The Three Musketeers)
- Gilbert du Motier, Marquis de Lafayette (later American Revolutionary War general)
- Louis de Rouvroy, duc de Saint-Simon
- Étienne de Boré, first Mayor of New Orleans

== Gallery ==
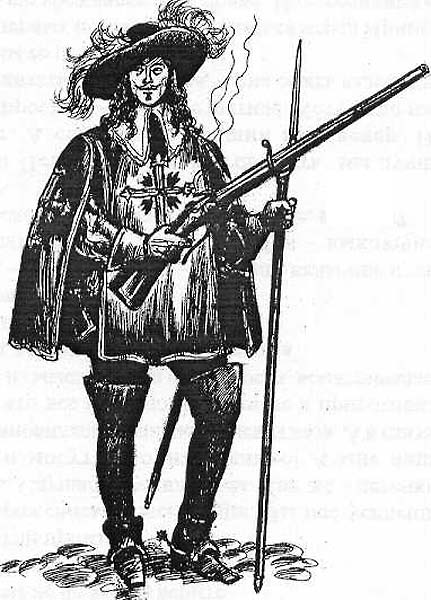
Musketeer of the Guard c. 1620s

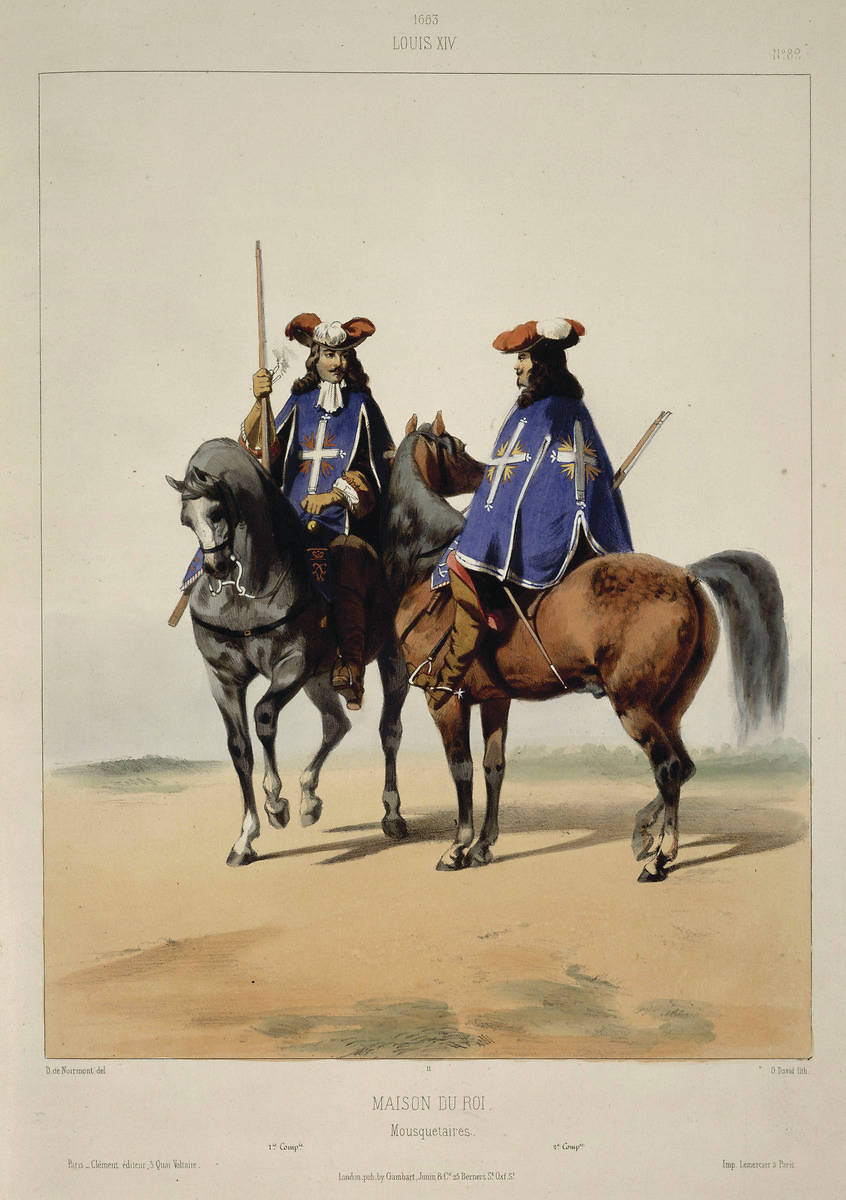
Musketeers c. 1660

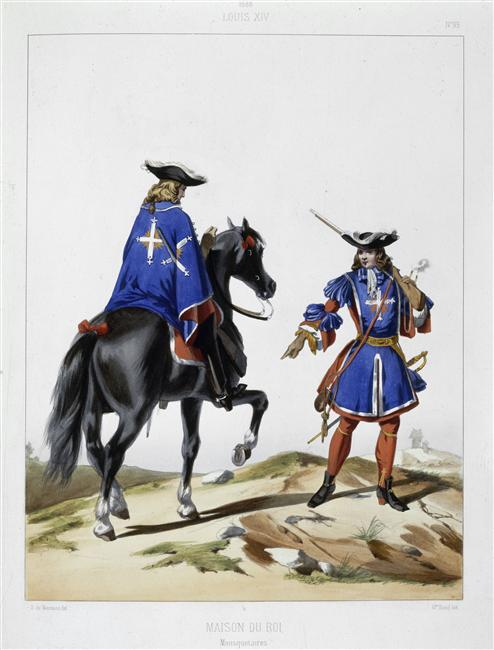
The Musketeers, late 17th century

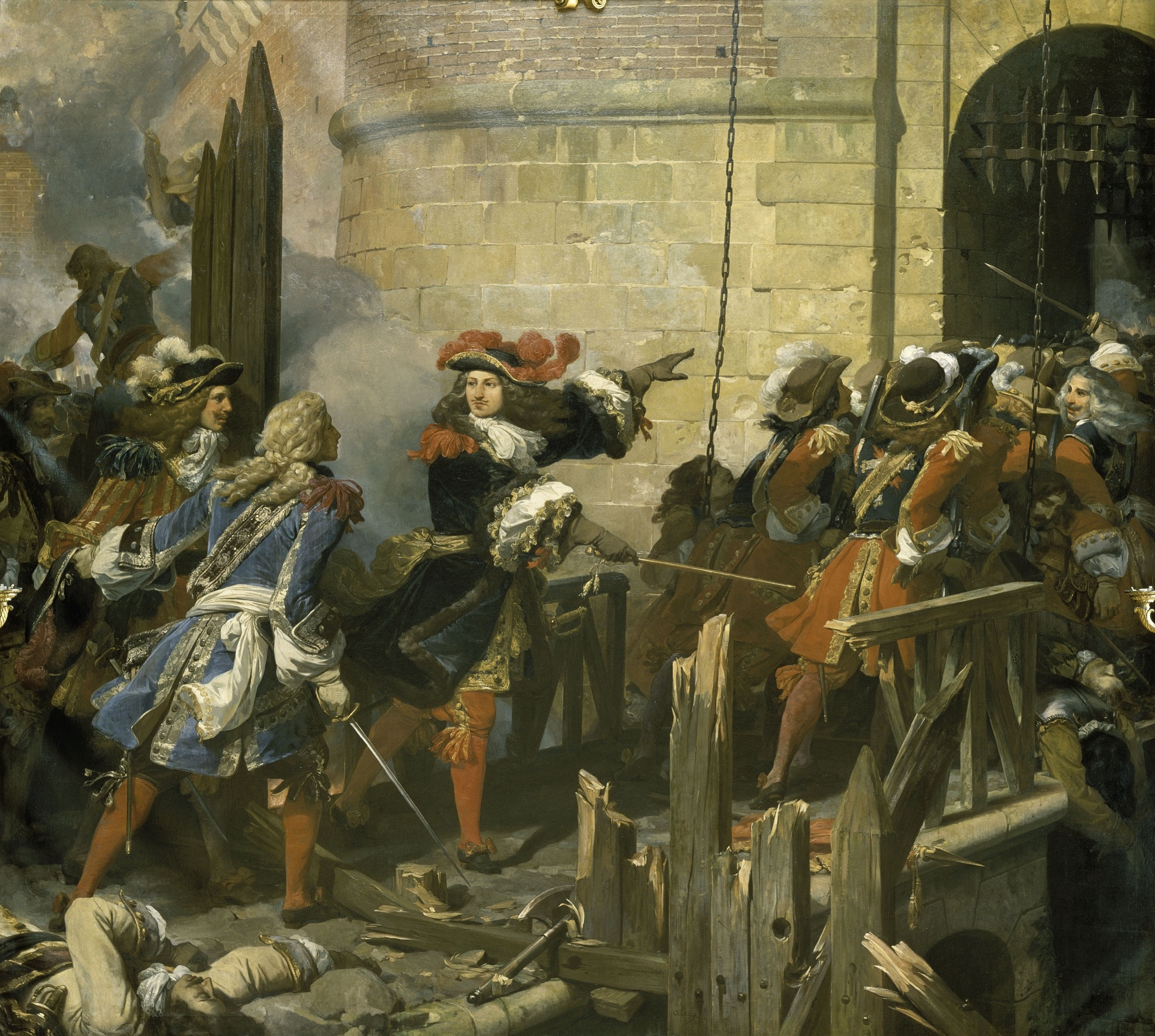
Musketeers in the storming of Valenciennes on 17 March 1677. A fragment of the picture.

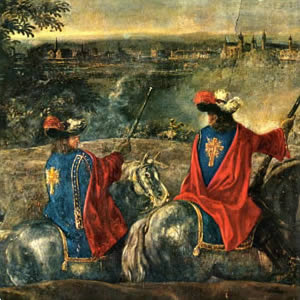
Musketeers in the storming of Ghent, 1678. A fragment of the picture.

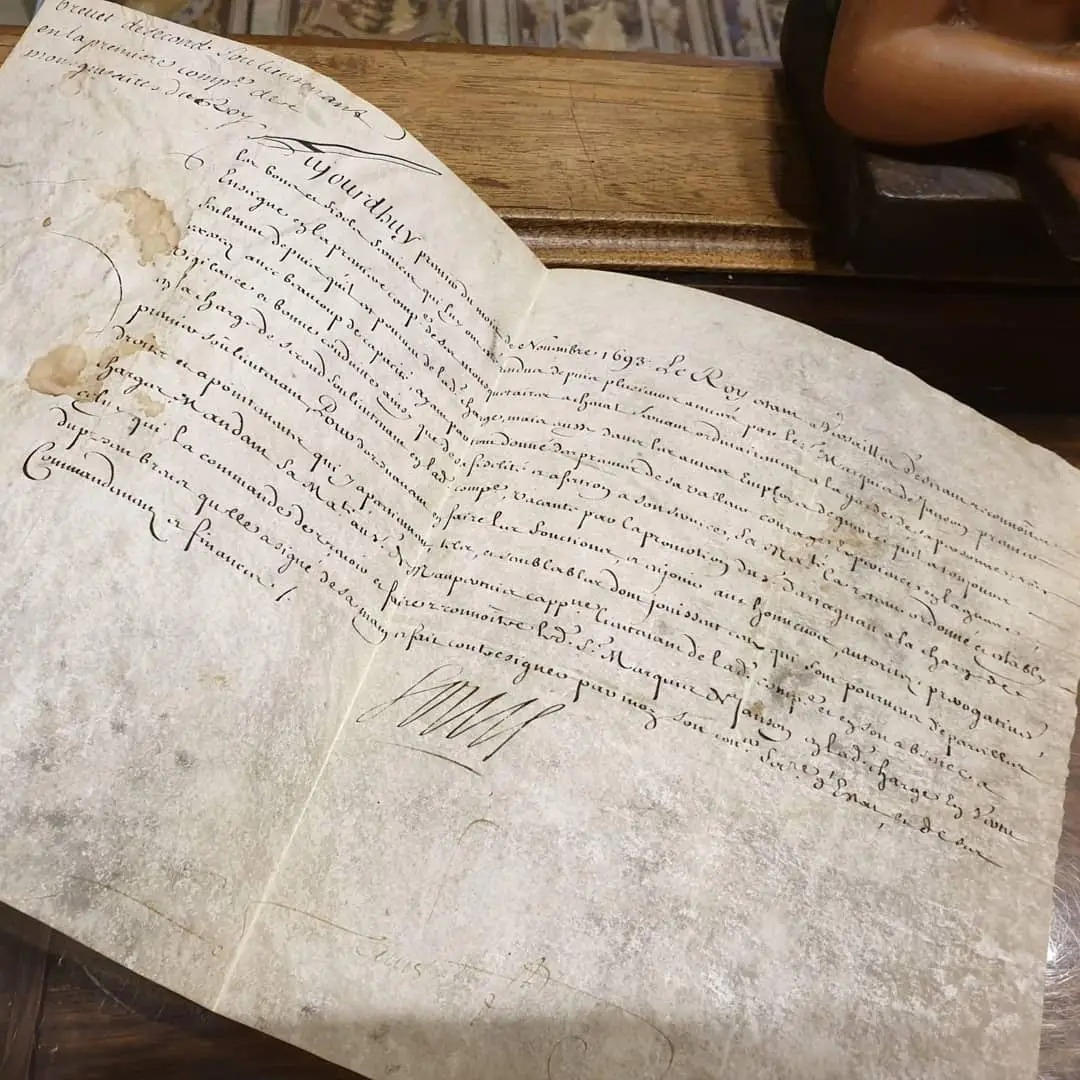
Promotion of Joseph de Forbin, Marquis de Janson, to second sous-lieutenant of the musketeers, 1 November 1693

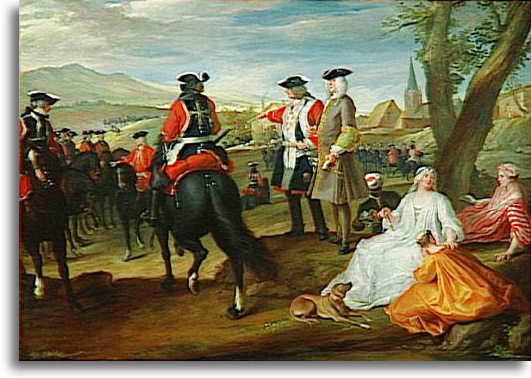
Review of Black Musketeers in the plain of Sablons. By Robert Paul Ponce Antoine, 1729

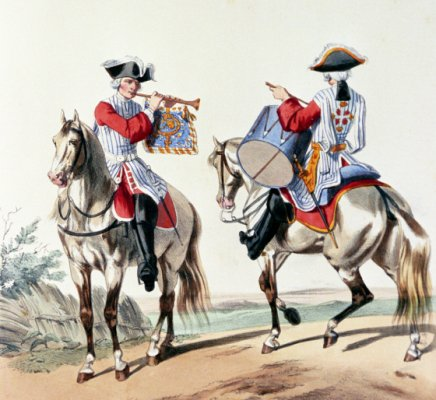
Musicians of the Musketeers of the Guard in 1724. Oboeist of the 2nd company and drummer of the 1st company (image source: Priscille Lamure)

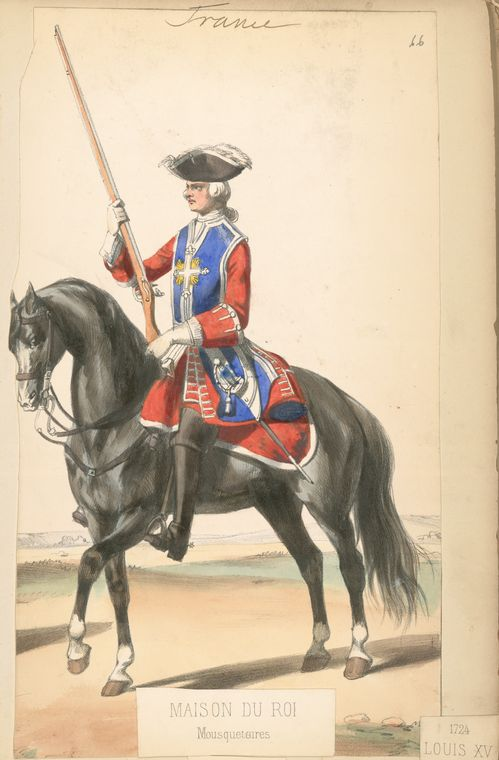
Musketeer of the Guard, 1724

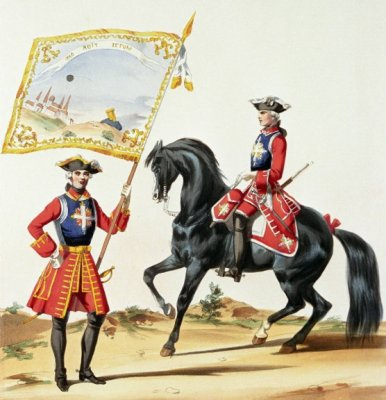
Grey and black musketeers, 1745

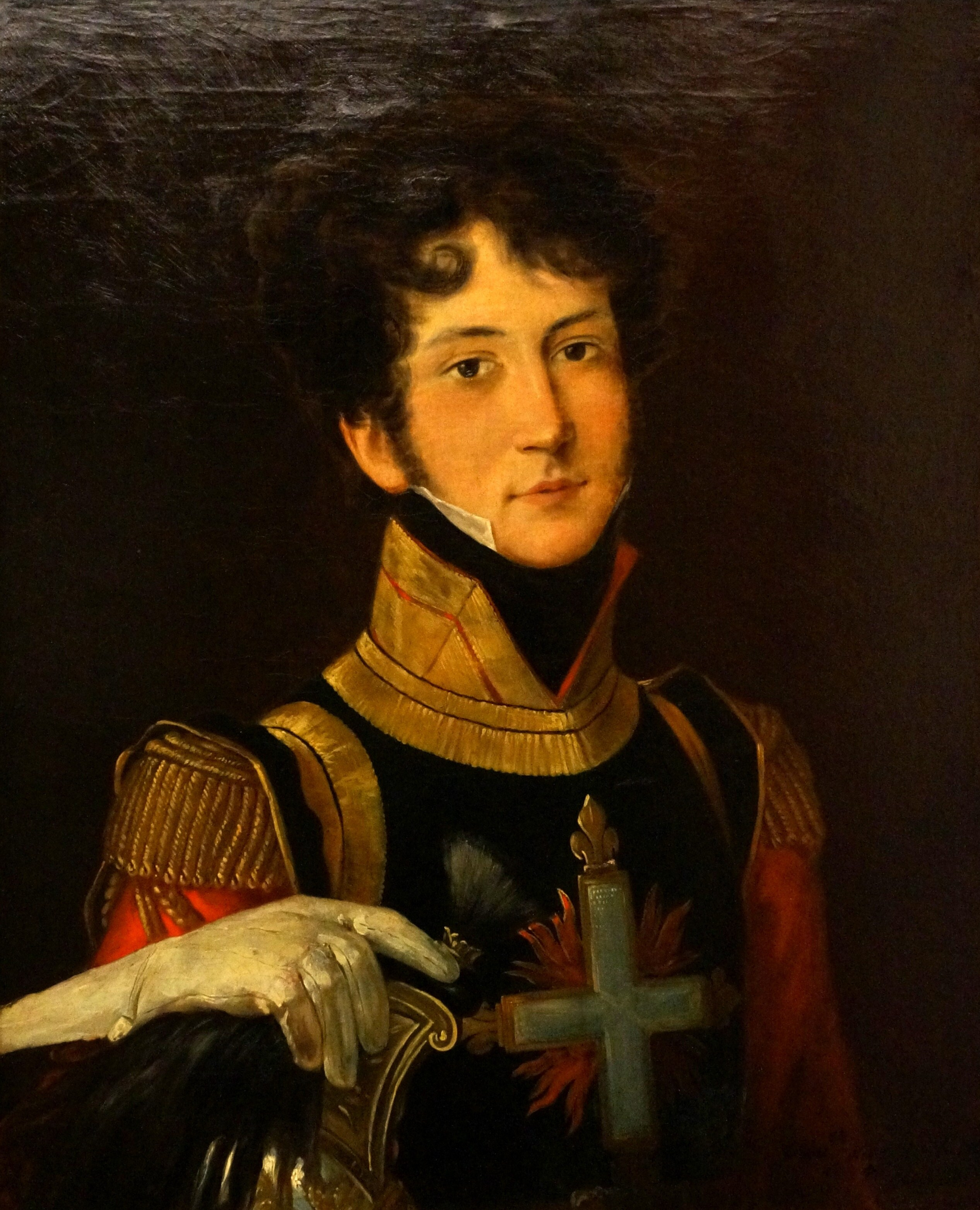
1816, second company

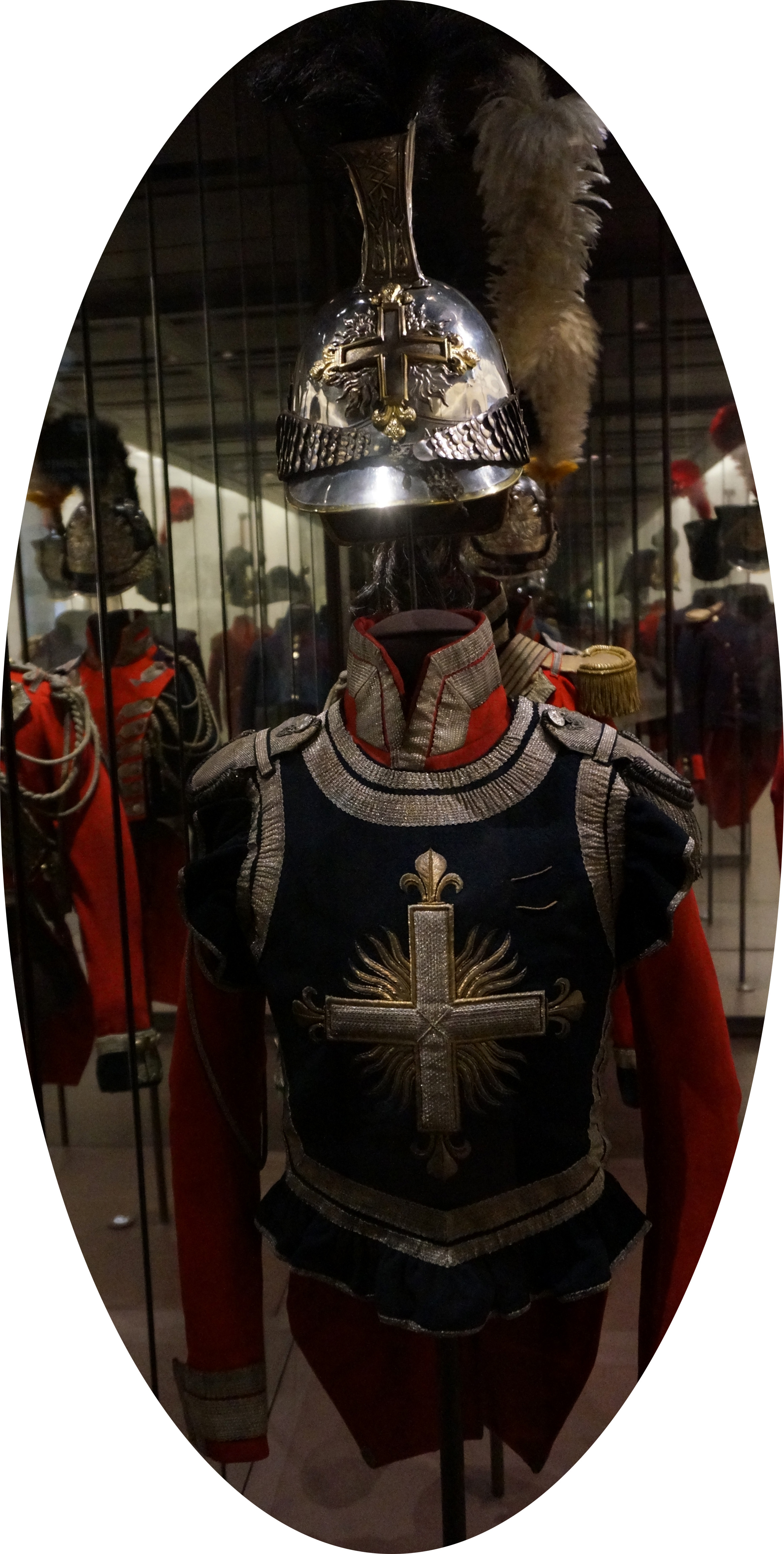
1816

== In pop culture ==
- The Three Musketeers
- The Three Musketeers (1973 film)
- The Three Musketeers (1993 film)
- Mickey, Donald, Goofy: The Three Musketeers
- The Three Musketeers (2011 film)
- The Musketeers (2014–2016)

== See also ==
- Carabinier
- Cuirasser

== Sources ==
- Jaffré, Marc W. S. (2025). The Courtiers and the Court of Louis XIII, 1610–1643. Oxford University Press. ISBN 978-0198957614.
