= Tiger Cruise (film) =

2004 television film by Duwayne Dunham

- Promotional poster
- Written by: Anna Sandor; Bruce Graham
- Directed by: Duwayne Dunham
- Starring: Hayden Panettiere; Bill Pullman
- Theme music composer: Steven Bramson
- Country of origin: United States
- Original language: English

Production
- Producers: Bill Borden; Barry Rosenbush
- Cinematography: Robert Seaman
- Editor: Don Brochu
- Running time: 88 minutes
- Production companies: Stu Segall Productions; First Street Films

Original release
- Network: Disney Channel
- Release: August 6, 2004

Tiger Cruise is a 2004 American family drama film that was released as a Disney Channel Original Movie. It debuted on Disney Channel in the United States on August 6, 2004. It stars Hayden Panettiere and Bill Pullman. The film's fictional events are intertwined with the real-life events of the September 11 attacks in which USS Constellation was, as depicted, actually returning from her 2001 Western Pacific deployment with "tigers" on board when the September 11 terrorist attacks occurred.

== Plot ==
Teenager Maddie Dolan hails from San Diego. She looks forward to the day her father Gary, a commander in the U.S. Navy, retires from military service so that he can share Maddie's life at home with her sister Kiley and their mother Kate. Maddie's dad invites her to participate in Operation Tiger: a five-day cruise for military families and their friends aboard the aircraft carrier USS Constellation, on which Gary is the Executive Officer. She agrees and soon hits it off with fellow teens Anthony and Tina. Tina is fascinated by the military, and her elder sister Grace is a United States naval aviator. Anthony, an aspiring drummer from New York City, would rather have nothing to do with the military, although his elder brother Kenny is a sailor. Maddie also bonds with preteen Joey Coleman, whose mom Diane is a "squid" (Naval slang for sailor) aboard the Constellation.

On September 10, 2001 (one day into the cruise), the "Tigers" are excited about the day's upcoming air show. Tina hopes to take pictures from the flight deck of Grace's jet taking off. However, the flight deck is a restricted area due to safety regulations; non-military personnel must watch the airshow from "Vulture's Row". Tina, Maddie and Anthony disguise themselves as members of the deck crew so that Tina can get the pictures she wants. The threesome are recognized by the instructor and brought to Captain Anderson's office. The captain reprimands the teenagers for their reckless actions, warning them that violation of any further regulations will get all three confined to their quarters until the carrier is pier-side. After the teens retire, Anderson admits to their families that more than anything else his threats were intended to scare the threesome into line and keep them there.

Gary, Grace, and Kenny express their disappointment over what happened during the air show. Commander Dolan tells Maddie about a tragic incident when a crew member was killed landing a jet during practice maneuvers. Maddie tearfully divulges her true reason for accepting his invitation: she dislikes the negative connotations that come with being a military brat. Maddie recalls how she and Kiley got jumped on their first day at school and suspended for fighting. Gary agrees to come home after the voyage.

On September 11, 2001, the crew and passengers learn of the terrorist attacks on the World Trade Center and The Pentagon. With the Constellation abruptly going on full alert, Tina realizes the truth behind her sister's assertions regarding the less-glamorous side of military life. Anthony fears for the safety of people he knew who had jobs in the Twin Towers. Maddie experiences her dad's honor, courage, commitment, and willingness to make sacrifices; where not only his family but also their country are concerned. Although upset that Gary is still needed in and by the military, she and her fellow Tigers express their pride and support by unfurling a giant American flag on the Constellation's flight deck. Maddie, having concluded that being a "brat" is not so bad after all, tells her father and his crew-mates to keep doing what they do.

== Cast ==
- Hayden Panettiere as Madeline "Maddie" Dolan, Gary's first daughter
- Bill Pullman as Commander Gary Dolan, Maddie's father
- Troy Evans as Chuck Horner, Danny's father
- Bianca Collins as Tina Torres, Grace's younger sister and Maddie's friend
- Nathaniel Lee Jr. as Anthony, Kenny's younger brother and Maddie's male friend
- Mercedes Colon as Lieutenant Grace Torres, Tina's older sister
- Mehcad Brooks as Kenny, Anthony's older brother
- Jansen Panettiere as Joey Coleman, Diane's son and Maddie's preteen friend
- Lisa Dean Ryan as CPO Diane Coleman, Joey's mother
- Ty O'Neal as Danny Horner, Chuck's son
- Chris Ellis as Captain Anderson
- Gary Weeks as Lieutenant Tom Hillman
- Barbara Niven as Kate Dolan, Gary's wife and Maddie's mother
- Jennette McCurdy as Kiley Dolan, Gary's second daughter and Maddie's younger sister
- E. Matthew Buckley as Pilot Brown
- Mark Christopher Lawrence as Pop

== Production ==
While the film is set aboard the USS Constellation, it was actually filmed aboard the USS John C. Stennis and the USS Nimitz. It was also filmed on location in San Diego.

Hayden Panettiere also performs the film's theme song, "My Hero Is You".

== Broadcast and release ==
Tiger Cruise had its broadcast premiere on Disney Channel on August 6, 2004, but the film had its premiere in Los Angeles with many stars of other Disney Channel Original Movies in attendance.

== Reception ==
Many critics noted that the film departed from the usual Disney Channel Original Movie formula. Laura Fries of Variety noted that the film "...carries many Disney hallmarks — a burgeoning teen-queen star, a catchy theme song and predictable subplots, but marks a departure from the net’s usual fairytale formula" and adds that writers "Anna Sandor and Bruce Graham deserve kudos for filtering a tough story through the eyes of kids without diluting the message... [The film] never feels exploitative or opportunistic." Mike McDaniel of The Houston Chronicle states that "The sobering events of 9/11 give this otherwise typical Disney movie unusual gravity." Barbara Vancheri of Pittsburgh Post-Gazette describes Tiger Cruise as "a veritable recruitment film with a predictable conclusion but it's a pretty good little movie with solid leading performances", adding "the movie comes down on the side of maturity, sacrifice and duty, and it's hard to argue with that." However, Anita Gates of The New York Times was more critical, describing the film as "a worthy two-hour movie", but notes that Tiger Cruise "feels polarizing rather than patriotic".

The film drew 3.8 million viewers, scoring a 2.8 household rating, and attracting 1.4 million viewers among tweens 9–14. Three encore telecast averaged 2.5 million viewers.

Tiger Cruise holds a 67% rating on Rotten Tomatoes based on six reviews.
