= Avalanche Alley =

- Home video cover art
- Written by: Paul Ziller; Elizabeth Sanchez
- Directed by: Paul Ziller
- Starring: Ed Marinaro; Nick Mancuso; Tobias Mehler
- Theme music composer: George Blondheim
- Country of origin: Canada
- Original language: English

Production
- Producer: Roger Corman
- Cinematography: David Pelletier
- Editor: Paul Ziller
- Running time: 90 minutes

Original release
- Release: June 30, 2001

Avalanche Alley is a 2001 live action Canadian television film directed by Paul Ziller and starring Ed Marinaro, Nick Mancuso, Kirsten Robek and Wolf Larson.

== Premise ==
Rick's (Ed Marinaro) small ski resort is going bankrupt and the investors have pulled out. His resort manager is drunk. His young, beautiful and possibly unfaithful wife is trapped in an ice tomb. And an avalanche is going to bury the lodge if he doesn't disarm seven bombs in less than two hours.

== Cast ==
- Ed Marinaro as Rick
- Nick Mancuso as Scott
- Lauren K. Robek as Lauren
- Wolf Larson as Alex
- Tobias Mehler as Simon
- Kirby Morrow as Jake
- Miranda Frigon as Tami
- Cholo Burns as "Scoob"
- Mark Holmes as Willie

== Reception ==
In Ski Films: A Comprehensive Guide, author Bryan Senn writes, "unlike some ski films...this one takes the avalanche issue seriously and portrays it realistically.
