= Tobias Mehler =

Canadian actor (born 1976)

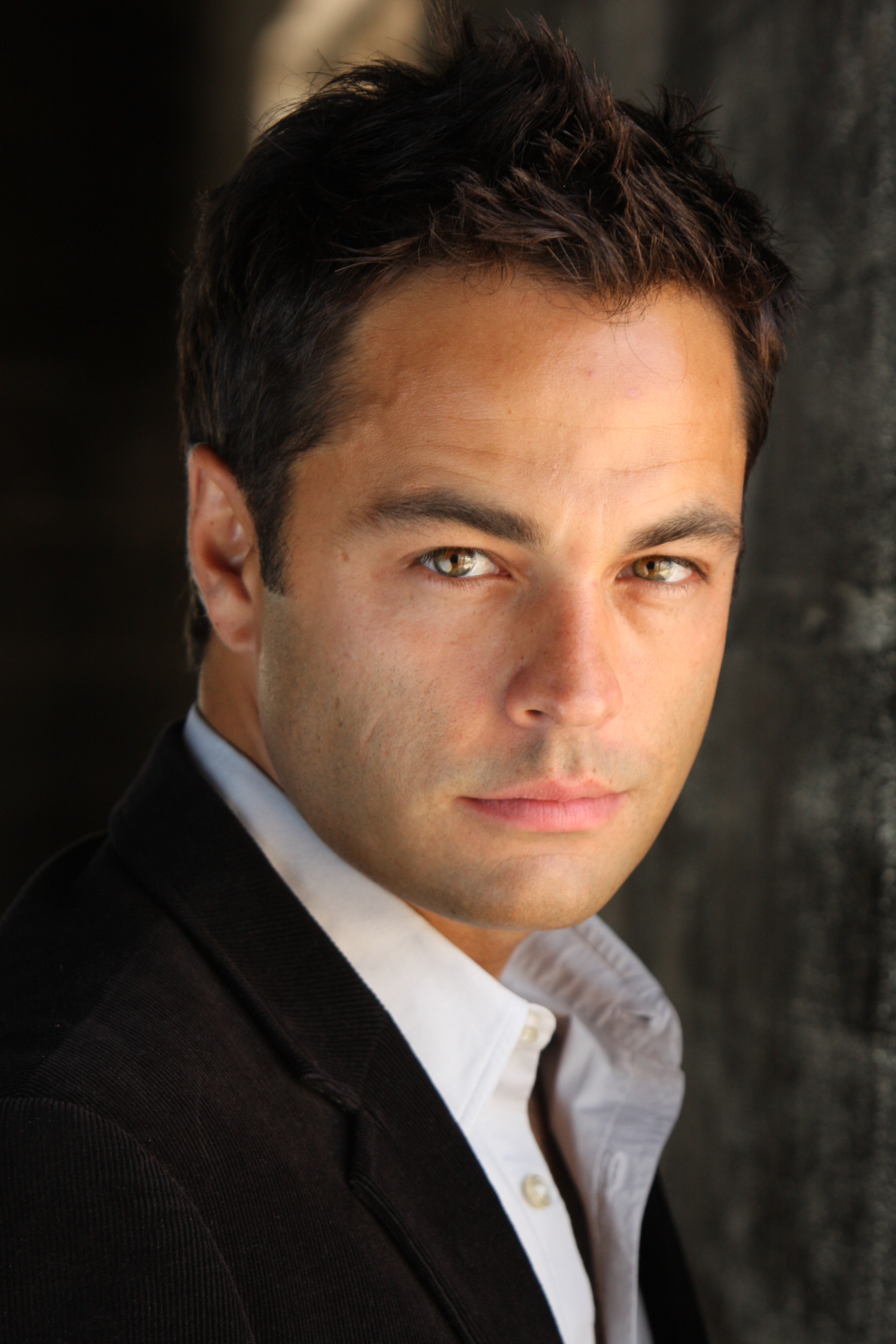
- Born: April 1, 1976 (age 50); Yellowknife, Northwest Territories, Canada
- Occupation: Actor
- Years active: 1994–present

Tobias Mehler (born April 1, 1976) is a Canadian actor who has appeared in film and television productions.

== Career ==
Mehler is known for playing d'Artagnan on Young Blades, Zak Adama on Battlestar Galactica and Lieutenant Graham Simmons in Stargate SG-1. He appears opposite Charlize Theron in Battle in Seattle, was a regular on the Canadian series Robson Arms for two seasons, and played a lead in the Fox pilot Killer App written by Garry Trudeau and directed by Robert Altman. Mehler has also appeared in several Christmas-themed television films.

Mehler played Harvey in Sabrina the Teenage Witch in 1996, Andy Effkin In Disturbing Behavior in 1998 and Tommy Ross in Carrie.

== Filmography ==
=== Film ===
Year	Title	Role	Notes
1996	Bordello of Blood	Boy in Bordello	Uncredited
1998	Disturbing Behavior	Andy Effkin	
2001	Wishmaster 3: Beyond the Gates of Hell	Greg Janson / St. Michael	
2003	Cellmates	Lawrence	
2004	Lucky Stars	Music Video Director	
2006	Canes	Tony Sturkel	
2007	Battle in Seattle	Jonathan	

=== Television ===
Year	Title	Role	Notes
1995	Frostfire	Boy at Party	Television film
1996	When Friendship Kills	Justin Phelps	Television film
1996	Sabrina the Teenage Witch	Harvey	Television film
1996	Poltergeist: The Legacy	Brad	Episode: "The Substitute"
1996	Madison	Garret Shea	Episode: "Stepping Into Starlight"
1997	Viper	Sanders	Episode: "Turf Wars"
1997	Breaker High	Prince Stephan	Episode: "When in Rome..."
1997	Love in Another Town	Peter	Television film
1997, 1998	The Outer Limits	Eric Nichols / Nicky Reeves	2 episodes
1998	Dead Man's Gun	Marcus Rice	Episode: "The Mesmerizer"
1998	Millennium	Alex Glaser	Episode: "Luminary"
1998	Silencing Mary	Mary	Television film
1998	The Inspectors	Drew Carrigan	Television film
1998	Killer App	Joe	Television film
1998, 1999	First Wave	Jason	2 episodes
1998–2002	Stargate SG-1	Lt. Graham Simmons	5 episodes
1999	Monster!	Travis	Television film
1999	Sagamore	Thomas	Television film
2001	Avalanche Alley	Simon	Television film
2002	Jeremiah	Zach	Episode: "Red Kiss"
2002	Cold Squad	Noah	Episode: "Live Fast Die Young"
2002	Carrie	Tommy Ross	Television film
2002	Taken	Lt. Williams	2 episodes
2004	Renegadepress.com	Tom	Episode: "Body and Soul"
2004–2009	Battlestar Galactica	Zak Adama	4 episodes
2005	Corner Gas	Umpire	Episode: "Slow Pitch"
2005	Santa Baby	Grant Foley	Television film
2005	Captive Hearts	Larry Sorenson	Television film
2005	Stranger in My Bed	Taylor	Television film
2005	Young Blades	D'Artagnan	13 episodes
2005–2007	Robson Arms	Bobby Briggs	8 episodes
2006	All She Wants for Christmas	Justin Allen	Television film
2007	Write & Wrong	Richard Fleiss	Television film
2007	Post Mortem	Evan	Television film
2009	Mistresses	Tom Satterfield	Television film
2011	Workshop	Male TV Host	Episode: "Urban Tiger"
2011	The Icarus II Project	Jonah Spencer	3 episodes
2014	Red Sleep	Dr. Dan Black	Episode: "Adapt"
