= L.A. Heat (TV series) =

- DVD cover
- Genre: Crime action
- Created by: Joseph Merhi; Richard Pepin
- Starring: Wolf Larson; Steven Williams; Dawn Radenbaugh; Renee Tenison
- Composers: Stephen Edwards; Louis Febre; John Gonzalez; John Sponsler; Alex Wilkinson
- Country of origin: United States
- Original language: English
- No. of seasons: 2
- No. of episodes: 48

Production
- Executive producer: George Shamieh Richard Pepin Joseph Merhi
- Running time: 60 minutes (approx.)
- Production company: PM Entertainment Group, Inc.

Original release
- Network: TNT
- Release: March 15 – May 19, 1999

L.A. Heat is an American crime action television series starring Wolf Larson and Steven Williams as Los Angeles police detectives. The series aired on TNT for two seasons beginning March 15, 1999.

== Show history ==
Produced by PM Entertainment, L.A. Heat began filming 1996, in areas that included Los Angeles, Beverly Hills, San Diego, Long Beach and Hollywood; some footage of car chases, explosions, and the like were sourced from previous feature films PM Entertainment had produced. Without the backing of a major network, L.A. Heat was not picked up for domestic distribution in the United States. It was instead sold in countries such as Germany (where it beat Baywatch in ratings), Lebanon, and France.

Due to financial troubles within PM Entertainment, production ended in 1998 after just two seasons; an attempt was made to produce a third season in 2000, but funding could not be secured. The series aired in the United States for the first time in 1999 on the cable network TNT. As of 2025, it is available on Amazon Prime Video.

== Premise ==
The show follows the action-packed adventures of two Los Angeles robbery/homicide detectives, Chase McDonald and August Brooks. The detectives are as different as night and day, but they work great together at keeping the streets of L.A. safe. Chase also makes extra money on the side by selling metal sculptures he makes himself, while August spends his free time running a youth center for underprivileged teens.

== Main characters ==
Detective Chester "Chase" McDonald (Wolf Larson) has been with the Los Angeles Police Department for seven years. A risk-taker, McDonald likes to live on the edge and is passionate about his work. Though a born leader, he often needs the guidance of someone with his partner's experience to keep him out of trouble. In his free time he enjoys making metal sculptures. He's in a relationship with Jodi when the series starts, but after they broke up, he began dating a variety of women, but none of them ever worked out. Despite their initial resentments towards each other, he began dating Det. Nicole Stockman towards the end of the second season.

Detective August Brooks (Steven Williams) is a seasoned veteran with sixteen years on the Los Angeles Police Department. In his youth, August was a promising boxer, a contender in every sense of the word, who always put his opponents down in the ring. But after discovering that his manager and promoter were embezzling funds from fellow boxers, and after he was forced to throw his first pro fight, August became disillusioned with the sport and left to join the police academy. Discovering he was a natural at police work, he quickly rose through the ranks of the LAPD to become a detective. He also runs the Hoover Street Youth Boxing Center in his spare time, an old gym he bought and converted into a recreation area for underprivileged children, providing an alternative to gang life. He also served in the Vietnam War.

Kendra Brooks (Renee Tenison) is the love of August's life, and works at the recreation center. Like August, she is known by all the kids who frequent the place, and she helps them with their problems from time to time. She and August have been married for five years at the start of the series.

Jodi Miller (Dawn Radenbaugh) is Chase's girlfriend. Having never been happy with Chase's job, she always expressed concern for his life and tried talking him into quitting many times to concentrate completely into his art. In episode "Killing on Lily Lane", she got a job offer to run an art gallery in Dallas, Texas and began pressuring him even more to quit and come with her. Chase refused to do so, insisting they could work things out, but ultimately, Jodi left without him.

Captain Robert Jensen (Kenneth Tigar) is the high-tempered superior of Chase and August. Despite the aggravation they usually cause him, he still considers them his best detectives. Despite appearing frequently in all but a few episodes, Kenneth Tigar is never billed in the opening titles, only at the end of each episode's billing of guest stars.

== Recurring characters ==
Arnold Cragmeyer (Christopher Boyer) is the head of the forensics lab and tends to always come through in helping Chase and August uncover clues and other useful information. He has a bachelor's degree is Forensic Science, and was previously a bomb squad commander in the premiere episode before requesting a transfer.

Det. Sam Richardson (Clay Banks) is another detective who assists Chase and August from time to time. He's originally from New York, but transferred to Los Angeles sometime prior to the third episode. Chase was the first cop he met and he wasn't too impressed with him, but he eventually grew to like him.

Det. Benny Lewis (Sugar Ray Leonard) was another detective who occasionally assisted Chase and August. He only appeared in the first, second, and fourth episodes before disappearing without explanation.

Annie Mason (Jessica Cushman) is a forensics assistant who joined midway through the first season. Her father is a detective in Riverside, California.

Dr. Judith Sands (Jessica Hopper) is the department's psychologist, whose assistance Chase and August sometimes require when dealing with the more crazed suspects. Her and Chase had a past relationship until he dumped her, claiming she was driving him crazy by always trying to get inside his head. She also had a somewhat successful (though short-lived) modeling career before becoming a psychologist.

Dr. Samantha Morecroft (Debbie James) is the new head coroner at the start of the second season. She's straightforward and to-the-letter, and is constantly put off by Chase's sly comments and flirting.

Det. Jack Lawson (Michael McFall) is a former D.E.A. agent who used his connection within the police department (his Aunt Grace, the police commissioner) to transfer to the department's robbery/homicide division. He thinks Chase is a little too on the reckless side, but ultimately comes to respect him.

Det. Nicole Stockman (Sandra Ferguson / Jillian McWhirter) is a beautiful but tough San Francisco detective. She came to Los Angeles to deliver a witness to the LAPD. Initially finding herself in conflict with Chase and his methods, they eventually became friends over the phone and through weekend visits. At the end of the second season, she returned to Los Angeles to strike a deal with a crime boss in return for him testifying against Bobby Cole. Her and Chase were getting serious about her transferring to LA so she could move in with him, but she was killed in a hit ordered by Bobby Cole.

Bobby Cole (Gary Hudson) was introduced early in the second season and became the show's only recurring adversary. Known as the "Teflon crime lord," he was a notorious criminal with everyone from politicians to police officers on his payroll and could never be connected to any of his crimes. Everybody in the city knew he was a vicious criminal who had committed dozens of crimes, but no one could prove it. After numerous confrontations, his organization was finally broken down, and Cole was shot and killed by Chase in the series finale.

== Other appearances ==
- Sam J. Jones made two guest appearances on the show: as a good guy in the first-season episode "Old Scores" and as a bad guy in the second-season episode "Legacy of A Buffalo Soldier."
- Angelo Tiffe made two appearances as August Brooks' former partner, Robert "The Falcon" Hatcher, in the episodes "The Falcon" and "Death House."
- Sarah Douglas made an appearance as police boss "Wilma" in the first-season episode "Electra".

== Episode list ==
=== Season 1 (1999) ===
No. overall	No. in season	Title	Directed by	Written by	Original release date
1	1	"Daybomber"	Richard Pepin	Joseph John Barmettler	March 15, 1999
2	2	"Too Young to Die"	Richard Pepin	Richard Preston Jr.	March 16, 1999
3	3	"In Transit"	Richard Pepin	Richard Preston Jr.	March 17, 1999
4	4	"Electra"	Richard Pepin	William Applegate Jr.	March 18, 1999
5	5	"Silicon Sting"	Paul G. Volk	Jacobsen Hart	March 19, 1999
6	6	"Cop Star"	Joey Travolta	Joseph John Barmettler	March 22, 1999
7	7	"Strange Currencies"	Cole McKay	William Applegate Jr.	March 23, 1999
8	8	"Rage"	Joseph John Barmettler	Joseph John Barmettler	March 24, 1999
9	9	"Words Will Never Hurt Me"	Richard Pepin	Nathan Long	March 25, 1999
10	10	"Rap Sheet"	Lawrence Hilton-Jacobs	William Lawlor	March 26, 1999
11	11	"For Whom the Bullet Tolls"	Cole McKay	William Lawlor & Giuseppie Gillis	March 29, 1999
12	12	"Old Scores"	Richard Pepin	Story by : Art Camacho; Teleplay by : Richard Preston Jr.	March 30, 1999
13	13	"My Brother's Keeper"	Paul G. Volk	Nick Stone	March 31, 1999
14	14	"211 Kidney"	Bill Tunnicliffe	Nick Stone	April 1, 1999
15	15	"Special Order 40"	Robert Radler	Jacobsen Hart & Joseph John Barmettler	April 2, 1999
16	16	"Falcon"	Joseph Merhi	Nick Stone	April 5, 1999
17	17	"Green Justice"	Art Camacho	William Lawlor	April 6, 1999
18	18	"Smash and Grab"	Ken Blakey	Story by : William Applegate Jr. & Kyle Einhorn; Teleplay by : Kyle Einhorn	April 7, 1999
19	19	"Killing on Lily Lane"	Jerry Jacobs	Nick Stone & Nathan Long	April 8, 1999
20	20	"Death House"	Cole McKay	Nick Stone	April 9, 1999
21	21	"When Irish Eyes Are Smiling"	Joseph John Barmettler	Story by : William Applegate Jr., Shari Lane Bowles,& William Lawlor; Teleplay by : Nathan Long	April 12, 1999
22	22	"Chester Nut"	Joey Travolta	William Applegate Jr. & William Lawlor	April 13, 1999
23	23	"Captain Crimestopper"	Jerry P. Jacobs	Story by : Mark Sikes; Teleplay by : Mark Sikes & Nathan Long	April 14, 1999
24	24	"Big Guns"	Paul G. Volk	Nick Stone & Shari Lane Bowles	April 15, 1999
25	25	"National Security"	Jerry Jacobs	Richard Preston Jr.	April 16, 1999
26	26	"Wake Up Call"	Richard Pepin	Nathan Long	April 19, 1999

=== Season 2 (1999) ===
No. overall	No. in season	Title	Directed by	Written by	Original release date
27	1	"Fangs"	Richard Pepin	Nick Stone	April 20, 1999
28	2	"F is for Framed"	Paul G. Volk	Bob Stiff & David Byron Lloyd	April 21, 1999
29	3	"Burning Sanctuary"	William Warren	Richard Preston Jr. & William Lawlor	April 22, 1999
30	4	"Strip Show"	Jerry Jacobs	Nick Stone & Shari Lane Bowles	April 23, 1999
31	5	"Eyewitness"	Kevin Mock	Nick Stone	April 26, 1999
32	6	"Little Saigon"	Richard W. Munchkin	Richard Preston Jr. & William Lawlor	April 27, 1999
33	7	"John Doe"	Paul G. Volk	Nick Stone	April 28, 1999
34	8	"Widow Maker"	Raymond Martino	William Lawlor	April 29, 1999
35	9	"Obsession"	Richard W. Munchkin	Nick Stone	April 30, 1999
36	10	"Call of the Wild"	Cole McKay	Michael Gerbosi & Shari Lane Bowles	May 3, 1999
37	11	"The Bigger They Are"	Richard W. Munchkin	Nathan Long	May 4, 1999
38	12	"Faces of Fear"	Bryan Goeres	Bob Stiff & David Byron Lloyd	May 5, 1999
39	13	"The Monk"	Cole McKay	Nick Stone & Martin H. Lawlor & Michael Robinson	May 6, 1999
40	14	"Ties That Bind"	Kevin Mock	Bob Stiff & David Byron Lloyd	May 7, 1999
41	15	"In Harm's Way"	Cole McKay	Joseph John Barmettler & William Lawlor	May 10, 1999
42	16	"Bad Reputation"	Raymond Martino	Nathan Long	May 11, 1999
43	17	"Danny the Eel"	Bryan Goeres	Bob Stiff & David Byron Lloyd	May 12, 1999
44	18	"Cop Killer"	William Warren	Simon Porter	May 13, 1999
45	19	"Professor Benton"	Harris Done	Nick Stone & William Lawlor	May 14, 1999
46	20	"Legacy of a Buffalo Soldier"	Cole McKay	S.O. Lee & Helen Colomby	May 17, 1999
47	21	"Armageddon: Part 1"	Paul G. Volk	Bob Stiff & David Byron Lloyd	May 18, 1999
48	22	"Vengeance: Part 2"	Paul G. Volk	Simon Porter	May 19, 1999

== Episodes aired out of order ==
TNT aired a handful of episodes in each season out of order, which results in some confusion when watching the episodes in question. (The DVD release does not fix this mistake). Below is a comparison list of the episodes as aired and how they should be viewed.

- Season 1

Airdate Order	Correct Order
"My Brother's Keeper"	"My Brother's Keeper"
"211 Kidney"	"Green Justice"
"Special Order 40"	"Falcon"
"Falcon"	"Special Order 40"
"Green Justice"	"211 Kidney"
"Smash and Grab"	"Smash and Grab"

- Season 2

Airdate Order	Correct Order
"Call of the Wild"	"Call of the Wild"
"The Bigger They Are"	"Faces of Fear"
"Faces of Fear"	"The Monk"
"The Monk"	"The Bigger They Are"
"Ties That Bind"	"Ties That Bind"

== Home media ==
In August 2005, the first season of L.A. Heat was released on DVD by Platinum Disc, LLC. The five-disc set contains all 26 episodes in the same order as they aired on television. Aside from brief biographies for Wolf Larson and Steven Williams on the packaging, there are no bonus features.

== Worldwide airdates ==
Although L.A. Heat premiered in the US on March 15, 1999, it premiered earlier in other parts of the world.

- Germany - January 20, 1997
- France - March 16, 1997
- Portugal - May 18, 1997
- Russia - June 9, 1997
- Australia - December 8, 1997
- Poland - March 8, 1998
- Malaysia - July 9, 1998
- Italy - June 21, 1999
- Estonia - February 15, 2001
- Hungary - July 9, 2006

== Filming locations ==
- The building used for establishing shots of the police station is actually the Donald C. Tillman Water Reclamation Plant in Van Nuys. It is part of The Japanese Garden, and both are open to the public. Wide shots of this building, in the series, are taken from the 1992 PM Entertainment production C.I.A.: Codename Alexa.
- Sevens, the beachfront restaurant that the characters frequented, is actually the Venice Bistro, located in Venice, Los Angeles.
