= Poster Boy (film) =

- Theatrical release poster
- Directed by: Zak Tucker
- Written by: Lecia Rosenthal; Ryan Shiraki
- Produced by: Dolly Hall; Herbert Ross; Jeffrey H. Campagna; Rebecca Chaiklin; Vince P. Maggio
- Starring: Matt Newton; Karen Allen; Michael Lerner; Jack Noseworthy
- Cinematography: Lee Geissbuhler; Wolfgang Held; William Rexer
- Edited by: Zak Tucker; Pamela Scott Arnold; Trevor Ristow
- Music by: Mark Garcia
- Production company: Shallow Pictures
- Distributed by: Regent Releasing
- Release date: May 8, 2004 (Tribeca)
- Running time: 98 minutes
- Country: United States
- Language: English
- Box office: $62,062

Poster Boy is a 2004 American independent drama film directed by Zak Tucker and starring Matt Newton, Karen Allen, Michael Lerner, and Jack Noseworthy. It toured the gay and lesbian film festival circuit beginning in 2004 before a limited theatrical release in 2006.

== Plot ==
The film opens with Henry Kray being interviewed by a reporter about the events about to unfold on-screen. Henry is the son of a powerful and conservative Senator from North Carolina. Senator Kray has gained a national reputation in part by attacking homosexuality. Unknown to the senator, Henry is gay.

The senator plans to kick off his re-election campaign at a luncheon at Henry's college campus and he expects Henry to deliver his introduction. Henry's sexuality is something of an open secret around campus, to the extent that the campus gay activist group has created a chart of his many sexual partners. The night before Senator Kray is scheduled to arrive, Henry has sex with Anthony, a former ACT UP activist who's drifted away from activism.

The day of the speech, Anthony is approached by a campus activist who wants to enlist his help in outing Henry. Anthony and his friend Izzie have an argument about it and Izzie (who is HIV-positive) storms off. She's hit by the limousine transporting the senator and his wife Eunice. The senator's party brings her along with them and Eunice takes a shine to her. She gives Izzie a suit and invites her along for the luncheon.

Henry invites Anthony as well, insisting that he sit at the dais with him. Henry introduces his father, who begins his speech. As the speech continues, Henry stands up, pulls Anthony to his feet and kisses him in full view of the national media, outing himself before the activists have the chance to. In the firestorm of controversy, the Senator and his team decide to spin the event by stressing that the Senator still loves his gay son. Meanwhile, one of the campus activists congratulates Anthony for outing Henry, and even though Henry decided to "out" himself, the bond of trust that had started to form between him and Anthony shatters.

The film closes with Henry summarizing the aftermath. He and Anthony never see each other again, Izzie has died of AIDS and the Senator won re-election despite, or perhaps because of, the controversy.

== Cast ==
- Matt Newton as Henry Kray
- Karen Allen as Eunice Kray
- Michael Lerner as Jack Kray
- Jack Noseworthy as Anthony
- Valerie Geffner as Izzie
- Ian Reed Kesler as Skip Franklin
- Austin Lysy as Parker

== Production ==
Some scenes were shot on campus at Wagner College in Staten Island, New York.

== Awards and nominations ==
- Outfest Grand Jury Award Best Screenwriting - Ryan Shiraki and Lecia Rosenthal (winner)
- Locarno International Film Festival Golden Leopard - Zak Tucker (nominated)
