= Dead at 21 =

- Created by: Jon Sherman
- Starring: Jack Noseworthy; Lisa Dean Ryan; Whip Hubley
- Composer: Robert J. Walsh
- Country of origin: United States
- Original language: English
- No. of seasons: 1
- No. of episodes: 13

Production
- Executive producer: Roderick Taylor
- Running time: 30 minutes
- Production company: Qwerty Productions

Original release
- Network: MTV
- Release: June 15 – September 7, 1994

Dead at 21 is an American drama series broadcast by MTV in 1994. The series ran for eleven thirty-minute episodes with a two-part final episode. The series was created by Jon Sherman and written by Sherman, P.K. Simonds, and Manny Coto.

== Premise ==
Ed Bellamy (Jack Noseworthy) discovers on his 20th birthday that he was an unknowing subject of a childhood medical experiment. Microchips had been implanted in his brain, which make him a genius but will also kill him by his 21st birthday.

Accompanied by Maria Cavalos (Lisa Dean Ryan), Ed tries to find a way to prevent his death. The research center orders the termination of the project and the elimination of anyone involved. The center frames Ed for a murder and sends Agent Winston (Whip Hubley) to capture him.

== Episodes ==
No.	Title	Directed by	Written by	Original release date
1	"Dead at 21"	Ralph Hemecker	Jon Sherman	June 15, 1994
2	"Brain Salad"	Ralph Hamecker	Unknown	June 22, 1994
3	"Love Minus Zero"	Charles Winkler	Unknown	June 29, 1994
4	"Shock the Monkey"	Ralph Hamecker	Unknown	July 6, 1994
5	"Gone Daddy Gone"	Kari Skogland	Unknown	July 13, 1994
6	"Use Your Illusion"	Ron Oliver	Manny Coto	July 20, 1994
7	"Live for Today"	Unknown	Unknown	July 27, 1994
8	"Tie Your Mother Down"	Jefferson Kibbee	Unknown	August 3, 1994
9	"Cry Baby Cry"	Terrence O'Hara	Unknown	August 10, 1994
10	"Life During Wartime"	Jefferson Kibbee	Manny Coto	August 17, 1994
11	"Hotel California"	Ralph Hamecker	Unknown	August 24, 1994
12	"In Through the Out Door: Part 1"	Ralph Hamecker	Unknown	August 31, 1994
13	"In Through the Out Door: Part 2"	Ralph Hamecker	Unknown	September 7, 1994

== Reception ==
Ken Tucker of Entertainment Weekly rated the series as "B+." He described the dialog as "lame" but praised Noseworthy as a "lissome hunk," adding that the subtext "plays brilliantly" to the adolescent self-absorption of the MTV audience.
