= Tiger cruise =

US Naval voyage that allows civilian passengers

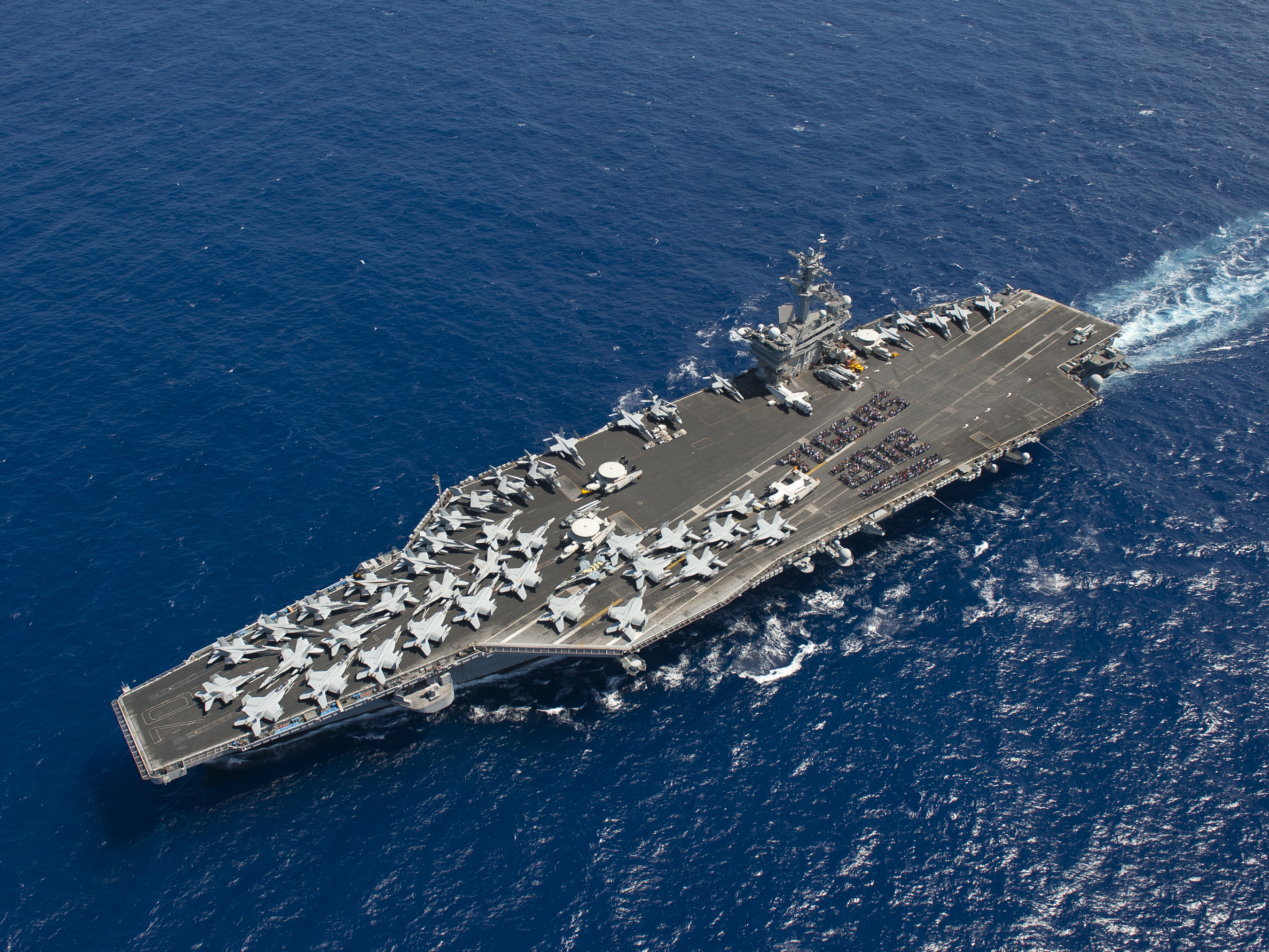
Tiger cruise participants commemorate their voyage with a spell-out on the flight deck of the Nimitz-class aircraft carrier USS Carl Vinson (CVN 70), May 2012

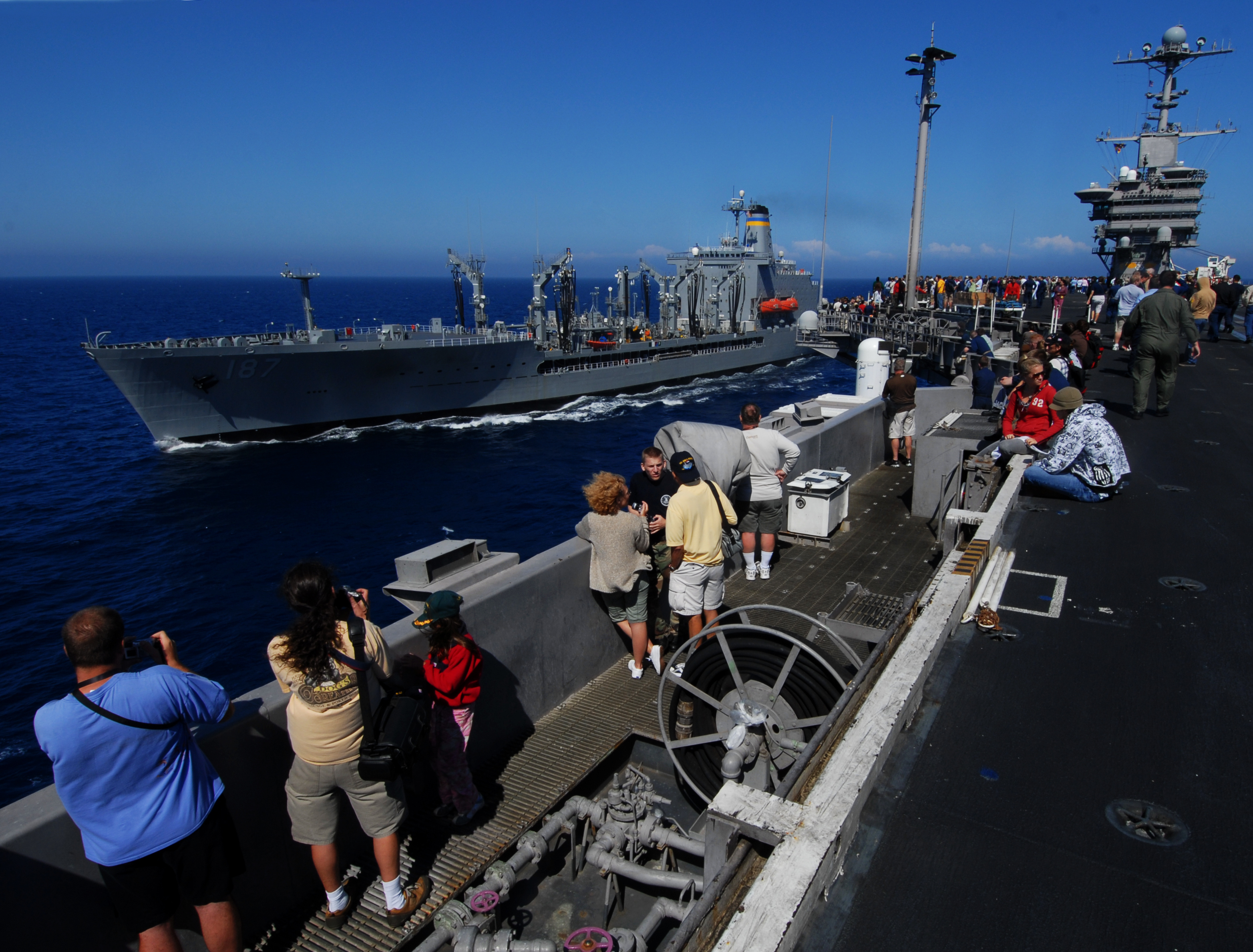
During the ship's Tiger Cruise, Sailors and their families observe USNS Henry J. Kaiser come alongside aircraft carrier USS John C. Stennis for a replenishment-at-sea demonstration in August 2007

A tiger cruise is an American naval voyage that allows civilians to accompany a sea-going United States Navy vessel. The voyage allows friends and family of deployed sailors and Marines to spend time aboard a sea-going vessel to learn about the ship's day-to-day operations. Civilians are sponsored by a Navy sailor or marine, who accompanies them on the cruise.

== In popular culture ==
In the JAG season 3 episode "Tiger, Tiger", Harm, Bud, and Josh participate in a Tiger Cruise. The ship rescues a raft of refugees, who reveal themselves to be terrorists and take over the ship.

The 2004 film Tiger Cruise is set aboard USS Constellation (CV-64) during the tiger cruise at the ending of her deployment in September 2001. The story tells of the events aboard the ship before, during, and after the September 11 attacks. Constellation actually was underway to Naval Air Station North Island with a number of tigers on board that day. The carrier had already been decommissioned when the movie was filmed; USS John C. Stennis, and USS Nimitz were used as stand-ins.

In the NCIS episode "Love Boat", NCIS agents investigate a murder that takes place on a tiger cruise.
