= T. and T. =

Television series

- Genre: Crime drama
- Created by: Michael Hirsh; Elia Katz; Patrick Loubert
- Starring: Mr. T Alex Amini; Kristina Nicoll; David Nerman; Ken James; Catherine Disher; Jackie Richardson; Rachael Crawford; Sean Roberge; David Hemblen
- Countries of origin: United States; Canada
- Original language: English
- No. of seasons: 3
- No. of episodes: 65

Production
- Running time: 25 minutes
- Production companies: Nelvana (Note: As Nelvana T Limited Partnership (S2) and T and T III Limited Partnership (S3)); Hal Roach Studios (1988) (season 1); Qintex Entertainment (1988–1990) (seasons 2–3)

Original release
- Network: Syndication (1988–1989) / The Family Channel (1990) (United States); Global (Canada)
- Release: January 11, 1988 – May 26, 1990

T. and T. is an American-Canadian television series, in production from 1987 to 1990. It premiered in first-run syndication in January 1988, moving to new episodes on the Family Channel in 1990. It is a starring vehicle for Mr. T, after the cancellation of The A-Team in 1987. It was co-produced by Canadian animation firm Nelvana (in one of its few live-action productions), alongside Hal Roach Studios and successor Qintex Entertainment.

The theme song was performed by Merry Clayton.

== Plot ==
The opening voice-over has the premise.

T.S. Turner was a city-smart kid fighting his way off the street, until he was framed for a crime he didn’t commit. Amy Taler was a young crusading lawyer. She mounted an appeal to put Turner back on the street, this time in a suit and tie, working as a private detective. Together they are—T. and T.

The regular cast includes Mr. T, Alex Amini as Amanda "Amy" Taler, Kristina Nicoll as Terri Taler (who replaced her sister as Turner's new partner in 1990), and David Nerman as Danforth "Dick" Decker, the owner of the gym where T.S. boxes and, eventually, set his own headquarters. Other cast include Taler's secretary Sophie (Catherine Disher); Det. Jones (Ken James), who sometimes work alongside Turner and Taler; and in season two, teenage orphan Joe Casper (Sean Roberge), who lives with Decker.

For the first two seasons, Turner lives with his Aunt Martha (Jackie Richardson) and teenage cousin Renee (Rachael Crawford), upon getting out of jail and cleaning up his life. In the third season, a new detective, Dick Hargrove (David Hemblen) assists the team.

== Broadcast history ==
Airing on Global in Canada (then known as the CanWest Global System), the show aired in first-run syndication in the United States. However, the financial collapse of distribution partner Qintex in 1989 nearly saw the show cancelled, which put Nelvana on the brink of bankruptcy; in six weeks, the company managed to find a replacement syndicator, saving the show and the company. The series ceased production after 65 episodes due to economic reasons.

According to television historian Alex McNeil, ABC reportedly rejected a $1 million offer by the show's producers to air the series's first episode immediately after the Super Bowl in January 1988.

T. and T. is currently streaming on Amazon, Tubi, and Nelvana's official YouTube channel Retro Rerun. It is currently rerunning on the Canadian version of Adult Swim since January 2, 2023.

== Episodes ==
=== Season 1: 1988 ===
| No. overall | No. in season | Title | Directed by | Written by | Original release date |
|---|---|---|---|---|---|
| 1 | 1 | "Extortion in Chinatown" | Doug Williams | Story by : Patrick Loubert; Teleplay by : Guy Mullally | January 11, 1988 |
Series pilot. The duo come to the aid of a Vietnamese grocer being targeted by Chinese extortionists.
| 2 | 2 | "Mug Shot" | George Mihalka | Story by : Patrick Loubert; Teleplay by : Lyle Slack | January 18, 1988 |
Kate Richardson is a freelance photographer who accidentally becomes mixed up in a criminal conspiracy involving the murder of a union boss three weeks earlier. Meanwhile, rock musician Adam Dalton (Mark Holmes) becomes infatuated with Amanda.
| 3 | 3 | "Setting the Score" | Allan Goldstein | Story by : Patrick Loubert; Teleplay by : Stephen W. Dewar & John Gault | January 25, 1988 |
T.S.’s past comes back when the man who sent him to prison resurfaces as an up-and-coming boxer is accused of taking a dive.
| 4 | 4 | "Stowaway" | Allan Kroeker | Guy Mullally | February 1, 1988 |
| 5 | 5 | "The Drop" | Allan Kroeker | Story by : Patrick Loubert; Teleplay by : Stephen W. Dewar & John Gault | February 8, 1988 |
| 6 | 6 | "Something in the Air" | Allan A. Goldstein | Guy Mullally | February 15, 1988 |
| 7 | 7 | "The Silver Angel" | Don Shebib | Elia Katz & Maya Lebenzon | February 22, 1988 |
An elderly man in a silver suit pulls a Robin Hood when he begins stealing from a local grocery store run by a snobbish yuppie. Meanwhile, the Fat Boys, one of whom is T.S.’s nephew, drop by the gym to lose some weight.
| 8 | 8 | "And Baby Makes Nine" | Harvey Frost | Story by : Patrick Loubert & Guy Mullally; Teleplay by : David Finley | February 29, 1988 |
| 9 | 9 | "On Ice" | Alan Simmonds | Story by : Patrick Loubert; Teleplay by : David Finley | March 7, 1988 |
| 10 | 10 | "The Latest Development" | George Mihalka | Story by : Patrick Loubert & Alex Boon; Teleplay by : Alan Zweig | March 14, 1988 |
| 11 | 11 | "Junkyard Blues" | Don McCutcheon | Story by : Patrick Loubert & Guy Mullally; Teleplay by : Elia Katz | March 21, 1988 |
| 12 | 12 | "Killing Time" | Don McCutcheon | Story by : Patrick Loubert; Teleplay by : Guy Mullally | March 28, 1988 |
| 13 | 13 | "Sweet Tooth" | Don McCutcheon | Story by : Patrick Loubert & Renata Bright; Teleplay by : Renata Bright | April 4, 1988 |
T.S. is the only one to suspect the true motives of a seemingly reformed ex-con.
| 14 | 14 | "Playing with Fire" | Harvey Frost | Story by : Patrick Loubert; Teleplay by : J.D. Smith | April 11, 1988 |
A teenage flute player (Susannah Hoffman) is accused of arson.
| 15 | 15 | "Sophie a La Modem" | Stan Olsen | Story by : Patrick Loubert; Teleplay by : David Finley | April 18, 1988 |
| 16 | 16 | "Black and White" | Don McCutcheon | Story by : Patrick Loubert; Teleplay by : Guy Mullally | April 25, 1988 |
| 17 | 17 | "The Game" | Robert Malenfant | Story by : Laurel L. Russwurm; Teleplay by : Guy Mullally & Laurel L. Russwurm | May 2, 1988 |
| 18 | 18 | "Victim of Fashion" | Don McCutcheon | Story by : Patrick Loubert & Guy Mullally & John A. Connor; Teleplay by : John A. Connor | May 9, 1988 |
| 19 | 19 | "Special Delivery" | Vic Sarin | Story by : Guy Mullally; Teleplay by : Richard Oleksiak | May 16, 1988 |
| 20 | 20 | "Pros and Cons" | Don McCutcheon | Story by : Elia Katz; Teleplay by : Guy Mullally | May 23, 1988 |
| 21 | 21 | "Private Eyes" | Stan Olsen | Story by : David Finley & Dennise Fordham; Teleplay by : Patrick Loubert | May 30, 1988 |
| 22 | 22 | "Mickey's Choice" | Don Shebib | Elia Katz & Guy Mullally | June 6, 1988 |
| 23 | 23 | "Working It Out" | Don McCutcheon | Story by : Patrick Loubert; Teleplay by : David Finley | June 13, 1988 |
| 24 | 24 | "Now You See It" | Patrick Loubert | Patrick Loubert | June 20, 1988 |

=== Season 2: 1988–89 ===
| No. overall | No. in season | Title | Directed by | Written by | Original release date |
|---|---|---|---|---|---|
| 25 | 1 | "Straight Line" | George Mihalka | Story by : Patrick Loubert, Guy Mullaly, Richard Oleksiak; Teleplay by : Guy Mullalyand Richard Oleksiak | October 24, 1988 |
| 28 | 4 | "Straight Line" | George Mihalka | Story by : Patrick Loubert, Guy Mullaly, Richard Oleksiak; Teleplay by : Guy Mullalyand Richard Oleksiak | October 24, 1988 |
| 29 | 5 | "The Whole Truth" | Allan Kroeker | Story by : Richard Oleksiak; Teleplay by : Richard Oleksiakand D. J. Fordham | October 31, 1988 |
| 30 | 6 | "A Secret No More" | Don McCutcheon | Story by : D. J. Fordhamand Toby W. R. Mullaly; Teleplay by : Beacon Brothers | November 7, 1988 |
| 31 | 7 | "Fast Friends" | Alan Simmonds | Story by : D. J. Fordham; Teleplay by : Stephen W. Dewar | November 14, 1988 |
| 32 | 8 | "Every Picture..." | Don McCutcheon | Story by : Patrick Loubertand Carl Binder; Teleplay by : Carl Binder | November 21, 1988 |
| 33 | 9 | "Hostage" | Don McCutcheon | Guy Mullaly | November 28, 1988 |
| 34 | 10 | "Conspiracy" | Rob Malenfant | Story by : Patrick Loubertand Guy Mullaly; Teleplay by : Guy Mullaly | December 5, 1988 |
| 35 | 11 | "Hard Way Home" | Al Waxman | Story by : Toby W.R. Mullally and Peter Mitchell; Teleplay by : Peter Mitchell | January 23, 1989 |
| 36 | 12 | "Wendell's Story" | Don McCutcheon | Renata Bright | January 30, 1989 |
| 37 | 13 | "Hunted" | Alan Simmonds | Story by : Guy Mullalyand Richard Oleksiak; Teleplay by : Richard Oleksiak | February 6, 1989 |
| 38 | 14 | "The Contender" | Alan Simmonds | Story by : Patrick Loubertand Steven Bawol; Teleplay by : Steven Bawol | February 13, 1989 |
| 39 | 15 | "Jump Start" | Don McCutcheon | Story by : John Ryan; Teleplay by : Richard Oleksiak | February 20, 1989 |
| 40 | 16 | "Substitute Teacher" | Patrick Loubert | David Finley | February 27, 1989 |
| 41 | 17 | "Turner for the Defense" | Patrick Loubert | Story by : Guy Mullally; Teleplay by : J. D. Smith | May 1, 1989 |
| 42 | 18 | "Thicker Than Water" | F. Harvey Frost | Story by : Guy Mullaly; Teleplay by : D. J. Fordham | May 8, 1989 |
| 43 | 19 | "Family Honour" | Richard Bugajski | Story by : Patrick Loubertand Randy Butcher; Teleplay by : Randy Butcher | May 15, 1989 |
| 44 | 20 | "A Natural Death" | Patrick Loubert | Patrick Loubert | May 22, 1989 |

=== Season 3: 1990 ===
| No. overall | No. in season | Title | Directed by | Written by | Original release date |
|---|---|---|---|---|---|
| 45 | 1 | "Cracked" | Don McCutcheon | Story by : D.J. Fordham & Patrick Loubert; Teleplay by : D.J. Fordham | January 6, 1990 |
| 46 | 2 | "Hargrove's Call" | Don McCutcheon | Story by : Richard Oleksiak & Patrick Loubert; Teleplay by : Richard Oleksiak | January 13, 1990 |
| 47 | 3 | "Halfway to Nowhere" | Don McCutcheon | Story by : Richard Oleksiak & Patrick Louber; Teleplay by : Richard Oleksiak | January 20, 1990 |
| 48 | 4 | "Cry Wolf" | Alan Simmonds | Guy Mullaly | January 27, 1990 |
A film student tries to prove she caught a crime on camera.
| 49 | 5 | "Decker's Ex" | Ken Girotti | Richard Oleksiak | February 3, 1990 |
| 50 | 6 | "Take My Life, Please" | Alan Simmonds | Story by : Toby Mullaly; Teleplay by : Tim Simms | February 10, 1990 |
| 51 | 7 | "A Lesson in Values" | Clay Borris | Story by : Patrick Loubert & Richard Oleksiak; Teleplay by : Richard Oleksiak | February 17, 1990 |
| 52 | 8 | "The Mysterious Mauler" | Alan Simmonds | Story by : Patrick Loubert & Toby Mullaly; Teleplay by : Toby Mullaly | February 24, 1990 |
| 53 | 9 | "Movie Madness" | Don McCutcheon | Story by : John Ryan & Toby Mullaly; Teleplay by : Toby Mullaly | March 3, 1990 |
| 54 | 10 | "Silent Witness" | Alan Simmonds | Story by : Patrick Loubert; Teleplay by : Marlene Matthews | March 10, 1990 |
Turner is charged with protecting a deaf boy who is a witness to a robbery.
| 55 | 11 | "A Place in History" | Alan Simmonds | J.D. Smith | March 17, 1990 |
| 56 | 12 | "Thief of Hearts" | Don McCutcheon | Story by : Toby Mullaly; Teleplay by : J.D. Smith | March 24, 1990 |
| 57 | 13 | "The Curse" | Patrick Loubert | Story by : D.J. Fordham & Toby Mullaly; Teleplay by : D.J. Fordham | March 31, 1990 |
| 58 | 14 | "Mr. Big" | Don McCutcheon | Story by : Patrick Loubert & Renata Bright; Teleplay by : Renata Bright | April 7, 1990 |
| 59 | 15 | "Butler Duet" | Don McCutcheon | Story by : John Ryan & Toby Mullaly; Teleplay by : David Finley | April 14, 1990 |
| 60 | 16 | "TV Turner" | Patrick Loubert | Story by : Patrick Loubert & Richard Oleksiak; Teleplay by : Richard Oleksiak | April 21, 1990 |
| 61 | 17 | "Nightmare" | Don McCutcheon | Jerome McCann | April 28, 1990 |
| 62 | 18 | "Suspect" | Ken Girotti | Story by : Patrick Loubert & D.J. Fordham; Teleplay by : D.J. Fordham | May 5, 1990 |
| 63 | 19 | "Turner's Tale" | Patrick Loubert | Story by : Patrick Loubert; Teleplay by : Toby Mullaly | May 12, 1990 |
| 64 | 20 | "Wild Willy and the Waves" | Don McCutcheon | Story by : Patrick Loubert & Renata Bright; Teleplay by : Renata Bright | May 19, 1990 |
| 65 | 21 | "The Little Prince" | Ken Girotti | Story by : Patrick Loubert & Renata Bright; Teleplay by : Renata Bright | May 26, 1990 |
