= Crash and Byrnes =

2000 Canadian action film

- Directed by: Jon Hess
- Written by: Wolf Larson
- Starring: Wolf Larson; Greg Ellis; Sandra Lindquist
- Production company: Shavick Entertainment
- Release date: 2000
- Running time: 95 minutes
- Country: Canada
- Language: English

Crash and Byrnes is a 2000 action film. It was independent developed and produced for Canadian television.

Brian Trenchard-Smith is credited as creative consultant.

== Plot ==
Crash Riley, a drug enforcement agent is forced to team up with CIA agent Roman Byrnes. Although the personalities and working styles of the two agents are drastically different, they become good friends while on the trail of a notorious terrorist who's attempting to launch a deadly attack on a North American city.

== Cast ==
- Wolf Larson as Crash Riley
- Greg Ellis as Roman Byrnes
- Sandra Linguist
- Joanna Pacula
