= Lisa Dean Ryan =

American actress (born 1972)

- Born: April 30, 1972 (age 54); Phoenix, Arizona, US
- Occupation: Actress
- Years active: 1985–2005
- Known for: Doogie Howser, M.D.; Dead at 21; Class of '96; Tiger Cruise

Lisa Dean Ryan (born April 30, 1972) is an American actress. She played Wanda Plenn, the girlfriend of the eponymous character in the series Doogie Howser, M.D., appearing in the series from 1989 to 1992.

== Career ==
Ryan co-starred as Jessica Cohen in the series Class of '96, which ran for one season in 1993. The following year, she co-starred as Maria Cavalos in the MTV series Dead at 21. The series ended after thirteen episodes. She has also guest starred in 21 Jump Street, Beverly Hills, 90210, Boy Meets World, CSI: Crime Scene Investigation, Diagnosis: Murder, NYPD Blue and Cold Case.

In 2004, Ryan co-starred in Disney Channel film Tiger Cruise opposite Hayden Panettiere and Bill Pullman. Her last acting credit was the 2005 Hallmark Channel film Mystery Woman: Vision of a Murder with Kellie Martin.

== Filmography ==
=== Film ===
Year	Title	Role	Notes
1995	Twisted Love	Janna Riley	
1995	Hostile Intentions	Caroline	
2000	The Stepdaughter	Linda Conner	
2001	Surfacing: AKA A Letter from My Father	Sarah	

=== Television ===
Year	Title	Role	Notes
1985	The Love Boat	Spock	3 episodes
1989–1992	Doogie Howser, M.D.	Wanda Plenn	46 episodes
1990	Casey's Gift: For Love of a Child	Sheryl Bolen	Television film
1990	ABC Afterschool Special	Carla Daniels	Episode: "Testing Dirty"
1990	21 Jump Street	Brooke	Episode: "Back to School"
1990	Beverly Hills, 90210	Bonnie	Episode: "The Gentle Art of Listening"
1991	CBS Schoolbreak Special	Amy Miller	Episode: "Dedicated to the One I Love"
1993	At Home with the Webbers	Annabelle Nelson	Television film
1993	Class of '96	Jessica Cohen	17 episodes
1994	Dead at 21	Maria Cavalos	13 episodes
1996	Forgotten Sins	Rebecca Bradshaw	Television film
1996	Diagnosis: Murder	Sheila Clayton / Lenore Stratton	2 episodes
1997	Crisis Center	Beth Shepard	Episode: "He Said, She Said"
1997	Boy Meets World	Mary Beth	Episode: "Learning to Fly"
1998	Playing to Win: A Moment of Truth Movie	Dana Erikson	Television film
1998	Silencing Mary	Holly Sherman	Television film
1998	Guys Like Us	Lisa	Episode: "Pilot"
2001	CSI: Crime Scene Investigation	Lynn Henry	Episode: "To Halve and to Hold"
2002	NYPD Blue	Dr. Jane Henderson	Episode: "Healthy McDowell Movement"
2004	Cold Case	Barbara Carise	Episode: "Hubris"
2004	Tiger Cruise	Diane Coleman	Television film
2005	Mystery Woman	Kate	Episode: "Vision of a Murder"
