= Wolf Larson =

Canadian actor

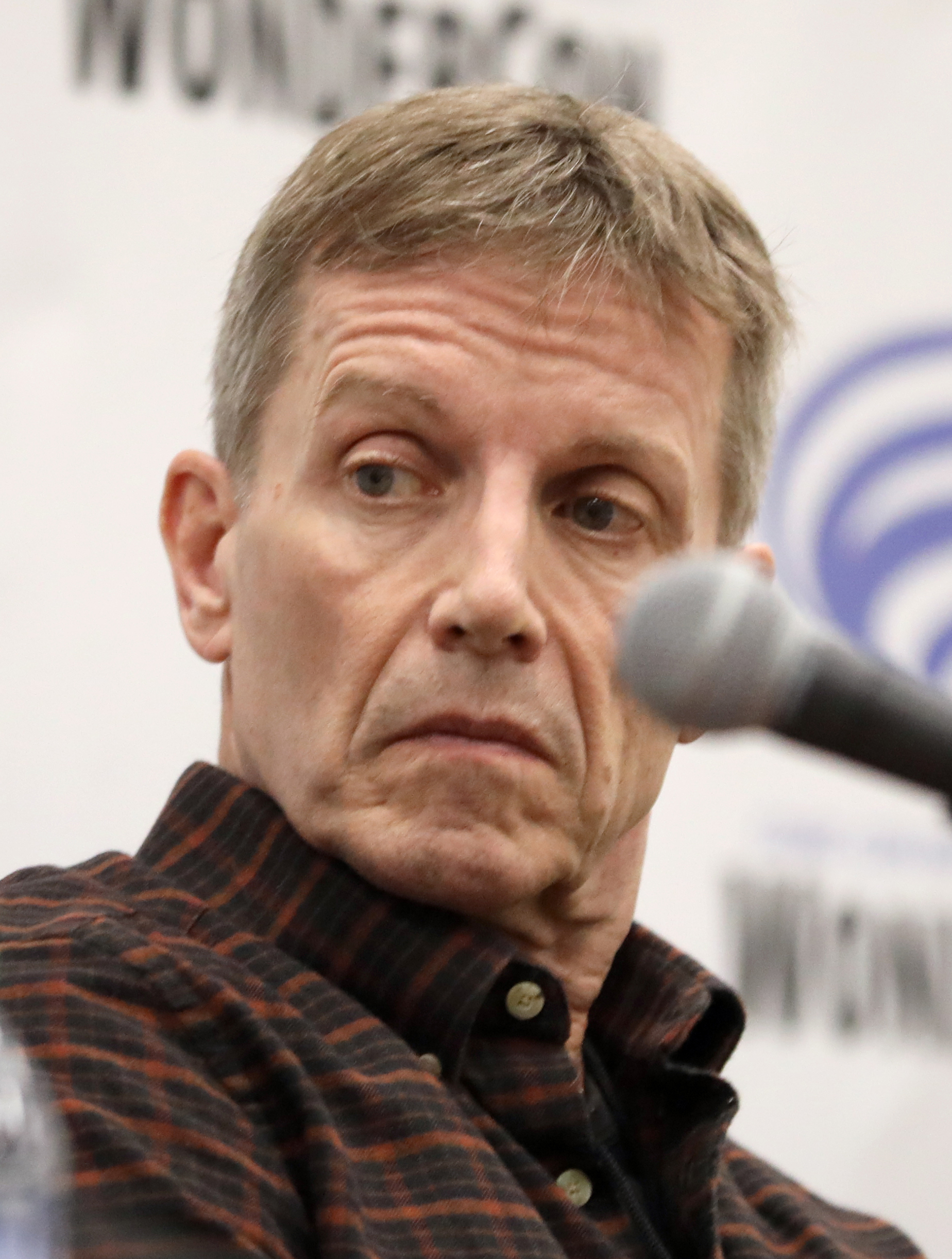
- Larson at the 2024 WonderCon
- Born: Wolfgang Wyszecki; December 22, 1959 (age 66); West Berlin, West Germany
- Education: Queen's University at Kingston, University of Nevada, Las Vegas (MBA)
- Occupation: Actor
- Years active: 1985–2006
- Spouse: Carolyn J. Larson (m. 1998)

Wolfgang Wyszecki (born December 22, 1959), known professionally as Wolf Larson, is a German-Canadian former actor, screenwriter, and producer. He is best known for his roles as Tarzan in the 1991 syndicated series Tarzán and as Detective Chester "Chase" McDonald in L.A. Heat.

== Biography ==
Larson was born in West Germany to Günter Wyszecki and Ingeborg Wyszecki. He has an older sister named Joana (1957 - 2017). In his teens, he worked as a waiter at the Chippendales nightclub.

Since December 2023, Larson has served as the Vice President of ERB Entertainment, a division of Edgar Rice Burroughs Inc.

== Filmography ==
=== Film ===
Year	Title	Role	Notes	Source
1987	Hard Ticket to Hawaii	J.J. Jackson		
1988	Picasso Trigger	Jimmy-John		
1990	Mad About You	Jeff Clark		
1995	Tracks of a Killer	Patrick Hausman		
1996	Hostile Force	Tony Reineke		
1996	Expect No Mercy	Warbeck		
1999	Crash and Byrnes	Jack "Crash" Riley	also screenplay	
2000	Castlerock	Cade		
2001	The Elite	Griffin		
2001	Just Can't Get Enough	—N/a	executive producer only	
2002	Shakedown	Agent Alec "Mac" MacKay		

=== Television ===
Year	Title	Role	Notes	Source
1991-1994	Tarzán	Tarzan	75 episodes	
1996	Tarzan: The Legacy of Edgar Rice Burroughs	Himself	TV special	
1998	C-Pop	Max "Jet" Ease	TV movie	
1998	Storm Chasers: Revenge of the Twister	Will Stanton	TV movie	
1999	L.A. Heat	Detective Chester "Chase" McDonald	48 episodes	
2001	Avalanche Alley	Alex	TV movie	
2004	She Spies	Justin Decker	Episode: "London Calling"	
2004	Creating America's Next Hit Television Show	Walter Montgomery #3		
