= Young Blades =

13-episode historical fantasy television series

- Genre: Action; Adventure
- Created by: Dan Angel; Billy Brown
- Directed by: Richard Martin
- Starring: Tobias Mehler; Karen Cliche; Mark Hildreth; Zak Santiago; Robert Sheehan; Michael Ironside; Bruce Boxleitner
- Composer: John Sereda
- Countries of origin: United States; Canada
- Original language: English
- No. of seasons: 1
- No. of episodes: 13

Production
- Executive producer: Dan Angel
- Editor: Graham Tucker
- Production companies: The Hatchery LLC; Shavick Entertainment

Original release
- Network: PAX TV
- Release: January 23 – June 2, 2005

Young Blades is a 13-episode historical fantasy television series that aired on PAX TV from January to June 2005, inspired by Alexandre Dumas's 1844 novel The Three Musketeers. Thirteen episodes were made before cancellation.

== Plot ==
Set in 17th-century France, the show follows the adventures of four musketeers.

== Cast ==
- Tobias Mehler as d'Artagnan, son of the legendary d'Artagnan in Alexandre Dumas's 1844 novel The Three Musketeers
- Karen Cliche as Jacqueline Roget/Jacques Leponte, a woman disguised as a man while on the run for murder
- Mark Hildreth as Siroc, an inventor
- Zak Santiago as Ramon Montalvo Francisco de la Cruz, a poet
- Bruce Boxleitner as Captain Martin Duvall
- Robert Sheehan as King Louis XIV
- Michael Ironside as Cardinal Mazarin
- Sheena Easton as Queen Anne

== Episodes ==
No.	Title	Directed by	Written by	Original release date
1	"Wanted"	Ron Oliver	Billy Brown & Dan Angel	January 23, 2005
Jacqueline, a girl in trouble with the law, dresses like a boy and joins the musketeers to avoid arrest, but she runs into trouble after an argument with D'Artagnan Jr. yet wins the respect of the instructor and two of the other musketeers, Ramon and Siroc. She soon discovers that her brother has been taken by the evil Cardinal to be used for experimentation by a secret society and sets out to rescue him. Along the way, she gains the help of D'Artagnan, Ramon and Siroc, and D'Artagnan discovers her secret.
2	"Rub-a-Dub Sub"	Ron Oliver	Billy Brown & Dan Angel	January 30, 2005
When a gang extorts money from local shopkeepers, D'Artagnan and Jacques go undercover to find who is behind this ill deed. Meanwhile, Mazarin finds out what the musketeers are up to and tries to frame them for the deed; Siroc creates the "sub aquatic chamber", the world's first submarine.
3	"Enchanted"	Richard Martin	Billy Brown & Dan Angel	February 13, 2005
French noble children are disappearing from their homes in the middle of the night without signs of a struggle, and the musketeers are called in to unravel this mystery. All the while, Ramon is falling under the spell of a beautiful poet and enchantress, who is really in cahoots with the Cardinal and the Secret Order. Their plan is to brain wash the children and then implant them back into society in two years' time.
4	"The Exile"	George Erschbamer	Matthew Cope	February 20, 2005
As her female self, Jacqueline rescues and falls in love with the exiled King Charles II of England, who is on the run from the vicious Oliver Cromwell. He offers to make her his queen, but will she choose to stay to fight for her own country or leave for love?
5	"DaVinci's Notebook"	George Erschbamer	Rick Drew	March 13, 2005
Siroc builds a machine gun that da Vinci apparently designed before he died. Meanwhile, Jacqueline has to fend off a girl who is obsessed with "Jacques" and is one of D'Artagnan's castoffs.
6	"Secrets of the Father"	Richard Martin	James Thorpe	March 20, 2005
D'Artagnan's father arrives at the same time that a list of French agents is stolen, and D'Artagnan begins to wonder what kind of man his father has become, when suspicion falls on him. Meanwhile, the Queen begins getting threatening letters.
7	"Four Musketeers and a Baby"	Richard Martin	Unknown	April 12, 2005
D'Artagnan finds a baby that he believes is his own, and he and his fellow musketeers attempt to care for the infant. Meanwhile, D'Artagnan has his hands full when he encounters the Highwayman, who is terrorizing people and wooing women.
8	"Coat of Arms"	Unknown	Unknown	April 28, 2005
Cardinal Mazarin tracks down a member of his society who stole a stone from the body of the Black Knight. Meanwhile, Ramon is upset with D'Artagnan over a woman, and they must work together to save her when the Black Knight kidnaps her.
9	"The Girl from Upper Gaborski"	George Erschbamer	André Jacquemetton & Maria Jacquemetton	May 5, 2005
Princess Tatiana of Upper Gaborski comes to France to sign the betrothal agreement with King Louis, but her country's newfound diamond wealth holds a secret. Meanwhile, the musketeers attempt to thwart a plot to kill the Princess.
10	"The Invincible Sword"	Farhad Mann	Matthew Newman	May 12, 2005
Ramon is injured by a legendary sword, and when Jacqueline picks it up, she becomes an invincible fighter, oblivious to its powers. Meanwhile, the musketeers must fight to save Ramon from death and recover Jacqueline before the sword steals her soul.
11	"To Heir Is Human"	Farhad Mann	Rick Drew	May 19, 2005
When a man is murdered by Mazarin's men, his brother and widow believe the musketeers to be the culprits, but they soon discover the truth. Meanwhile, the musketeers must keep the woman and her brother-in-law safe for he is the illegitimate son of the late King.
12	"Chameleon"	Terry Ingram	Gillian Horvath	May 26, 2005
While posing as her female self, Jacqueline, to befriend a woman from Captain Duval's past, she discovers that a man is posing as "Jacques" but unmasking the deceiver could expose her own secret.
13	"Secrets"	Terry Ingram	James Shavick	June 2, 2005
D'Artagnan and Jacqueline meet the famous author Alexandre Dumas and in a strange twist he relays to them that he is their creator. Meanwhile, Jacqueline learns her brother is back in France and wants to see her and Siroc creates a love potion which the musketeers test, with interesting results.

== Young Blades (2001) ==
A television pilot of the same title was filmed in 2001. Starring Hugh Dancy, it followed the adventures of the Musketeers d'Artagnan, Porthos, Athos, and Aramis. It was never aired.
