= Tarzán =

- Genre: Adventure
- Written by: Edgar Rice Burroughs
- Directed by: Henri Safran (23 eps), Sidney Hayers (20), Brian Trenchard-Smith (10), Kevin James Dobson (9), Gérard Hameline (3)
- Starring: Wolf Larson; Lydie Denier; Sean Roberge
- Theme music composer: Laurence Juber (1991-92); Robert O. Ragland (1992-94)
- Countries of origin: France; Canada; Mexico
- Original language: English
- No. of seasons: 3
- No. of episodes: 75 (list of episodes)

Production
- Production location: Mexico
- Running time: 30 minutes
- Production companies: Balenciaga Productions; Dune; TF1; Producciones Telemex; Producciones UINIC; William F. Cooke Productions

Original release
- Network: TF1 (France); First-run syndication (United States)
- Release: October 6, 1991 – 1994

Tarzán is a television series that aired in syndication from 1991–1994. In this version of the show, Tarzan (Wolf Larson) was portrayed as a blond environmentalist, with Jane (Lydie Denier) turned into a French ecologist. The series aired in syndication in the United States.

This was the first Tarzan series to feature Jane Porter as a major character, the 1966 series having excluded her as part of the "new look", and Tarzan, Lord of the Jungle having featured her in only one episode.

Ron Ely, famous for playing Tarzan in the 1966 TV series, played a villain named Gordon Shaw in the first-season episode “Tarzan the Hunted”.

Juma the Lion was performed by two trained male adult African lions. One of them was Sudan of Thousand Oaks, California's Animal Actors of Hollywood. He would subsequently perform as a stunt double for the Bowmanville Zoo's two lions, Caesar and Bongo, for Paramount's The Ghost and the Darkness. The other lion that acted in this series was Josef of Salinas, California's Monterey Zoo. Disney's animation studio used him as a live action model for Mufasa in Disney's animated production of The Lion King around the same era.

== Cast ==
- Wolf Larson as Tarzan
- Lydie Denier as Jane Porter
- Sean Roberge as Roger Taft Jr.
- Malick Bowens as Simon Govier (season 1)
- Errol Slue as Jack Benton (season 2)
- William S. Taylor as Dan Miller (season 3)

== Episodes ==
=== Season one (1991–92) ===
No. overall	No. in season	Title	Directed by	Written by	Original release date	Prod. code
1	1	"Tarzan and the Poisoned Waters"	Henri Safran	Patricia Maximilian	October 6, 1991	113
2	2	"Tarzan and the Silent Child"	Henri Safran	Maria Justina	October 13, 1991	111
3	3	"Tarzan Tames the Bronx"	Brian Trenchard-Smith	Steve Hayes	October 20, 1991	121
4	4	"Tarzan and the Picture of Death"	Gérard Hameline	Steve Hayes	October 27, 1991	103
5	5	"Tarzan and the Unwelcome Guest"	Gérard Hameline	Steve Hayes	November 3, 1991	115
6	6	"Tarzan and the Caves of Darkness"	Brian Trenchard-Smith	Anna Sandor & Bill Gough	November 10, 1991	101
7	7	"Tarzan and the Woman of Steel"	Brian Trenchard-Smith	Misha MacDonald	November 17, 1991	122
8	8	"Tarzan and the River of Doom"	Henri Safran	Steve Hayes	December 1, 1991	116
9	9	"Tarzan and the Killer Lion"	Brian Trenchard-Smith	Ted Julien	December 8, 1991	106
10	10	"Tarzan's Christmas"	Henri Safran	Anna Sandor & Bill Gough	December 15, 1991	114
11	11	"Tarzan and the Orphan"	Henri Safran	Ted Julien	January 19, 1992	118
12	12	"Tarzan and the Mystic Caves"	Henri Safran	Steve Hayes	January 26, 1992	110
13	13	"Tarzan and the Pirate Treasure"	Henri Safran	Misha MacDonald	February 2, 1992	104
14	14	"Tarzan in the Sacred Cave"	Brian Trenchard-Smith	Steve Hayes	February 9, 1992	105
15	15	"Tarzan and the Killer's Revenge"	Henri Safran	Misha MacDonald	February 16, 1992	124
16	16	"Tarzan's Journey into Danger"	Brian Trenchard-Smith	Anna Sandor & Bill Gough	February 23, 1992	102
17	17	"Tarzan and the Extra-Terrestrials"	Brian Trenchard-Smith	Maria Justina	March 1, 1992	117
18	18	"Tarzan the Hunted"	Brian Trenchard-Smith	Steve Hayes	March 8, 1992	107
19	19	"Tarzan and the Enemy Within"	Brian Trenchard-Smith	Anna Sandor & Bill Gough	March 15, 1992	123
20	20	"Tarzan's Eleventh Hour"	Brian Trenchard-Smith	Ted Julien	April 12, 1992	108
21	21	"Tarzan and the Deadly Gift"	Gerard Hameline	Steve Hayes	April 19, 1992	119
22	22	"Tarzan and the Savage Storm"	Henri Safran	Misha MacDonald	April 26, 1992	109
23	23	"Tarzan and the Golden Egg"	Gerard Hameline	Steve Hayes	May 3, 1992	112
24	24	"Tarzan and the Test of Friendship"	Brian Trenchard-Smith	Misha MacDonald	May 10, 1992	120
25	25	"Tarzan in the Eye of the Hurricane"	Henri Safran	Ted Julien	May 17, 1992	125

=== Season two (1992–93) ===
1. “Tarzan and the Missile of Doom”
2. “Tarzan and the Forbidden Jewels”
3. “Tarzan and the Broken Promise”
4. “Tarzan and the Amazon Women”
5. “Tarzan and the Karate Warriors”
6. “Tarzan and the Lion Girl”
7. “Tarzan and the Deadly Delusion”
8. “Tarzan and the Primitive Urge”
9. “Tarzan and the Mysterious Sheik”
10. “Tarzan and the Runaways”
11. “Tarzan Meets Jane”
12. “Tarzan and the Wayward Balloon”
13. “Tarzan and the Fugitive’s Revenge”
14. “Tarzan and the Mutant Creature”
15. “Tarzan Rescues the Songbird”
16. “Tarzan and the Fire Field”
17. “Tarzan and the Movie Star”
18. “Tarzan and the Fountain of Youth”
19. “Tarzan and the Law of the Jungle”
20. “Tarzan and the Shaft of Death”
21. “Tarzan and the Polluted River”
22. “Tarzan’s Dangerous Journey”
23. “Tarzan and the Toxic Terror”
24. “Tarzan and the Earthly Challenge”
25. “Tarzan and the Mysterious Fog”

=== Season three (1993–94) ===
1. “Tarzan and the Hollywood Adventure”
2. “Tarzan and the Witness for the Prosecution”
3. “Tarzan and the Rock Star”
4. “Tarzan and the Odd Couple”
5. “Tarzan and the Return of the Bronx”
6. “Tarzan and the New Commissioner”
7. “Tarzan and the Stoneman”
8. “Tarzan and the Deadly Cargo”
9. “Tarzan and the Sapphire Elephant”
10. “Tarzan and the Fear of Blindness”
11. “Tarzan and the Mating Season”
12. “Tarzan and the Gift of Life”
13. “Tarzan and the Death Spiders”
14. “Tarzan and the Russian Invasion”
15. “Tarzan and the Fiery End”
16. “Tarzan and the Curse of Death”
17. “Tarzan and the King of the Apes”
18. “Tarzan and the Evil Twin”
19. “Tarzan and the Dangerous Competition”
20. “Tarzan and the Pirates Revenge”
21. “Tarzan and Cheeta’s Desperate Adventure”
22. “Tarzan and the Sixth Sense”
23. “Tarzan and the Ring of Romance”
24. “Tarzan and the Night Horrors”
25. “Tarzan and the Jewel of Justice”

== Legacy ==
The show inspired the poem “Sunday, Tarzan in His Hammock” by Lewis Buzbee, which he wrote as "...revenge against Tarzan and cheerful aerobics instructors everywhere.”

Preceded by Tarzan in Manhattan; April 15, 1989	Tarzán; 1991–94	Succeeded by Tarzan: The Epic Adventures; 1996–97
