= Jack Noseworthy =

American actor

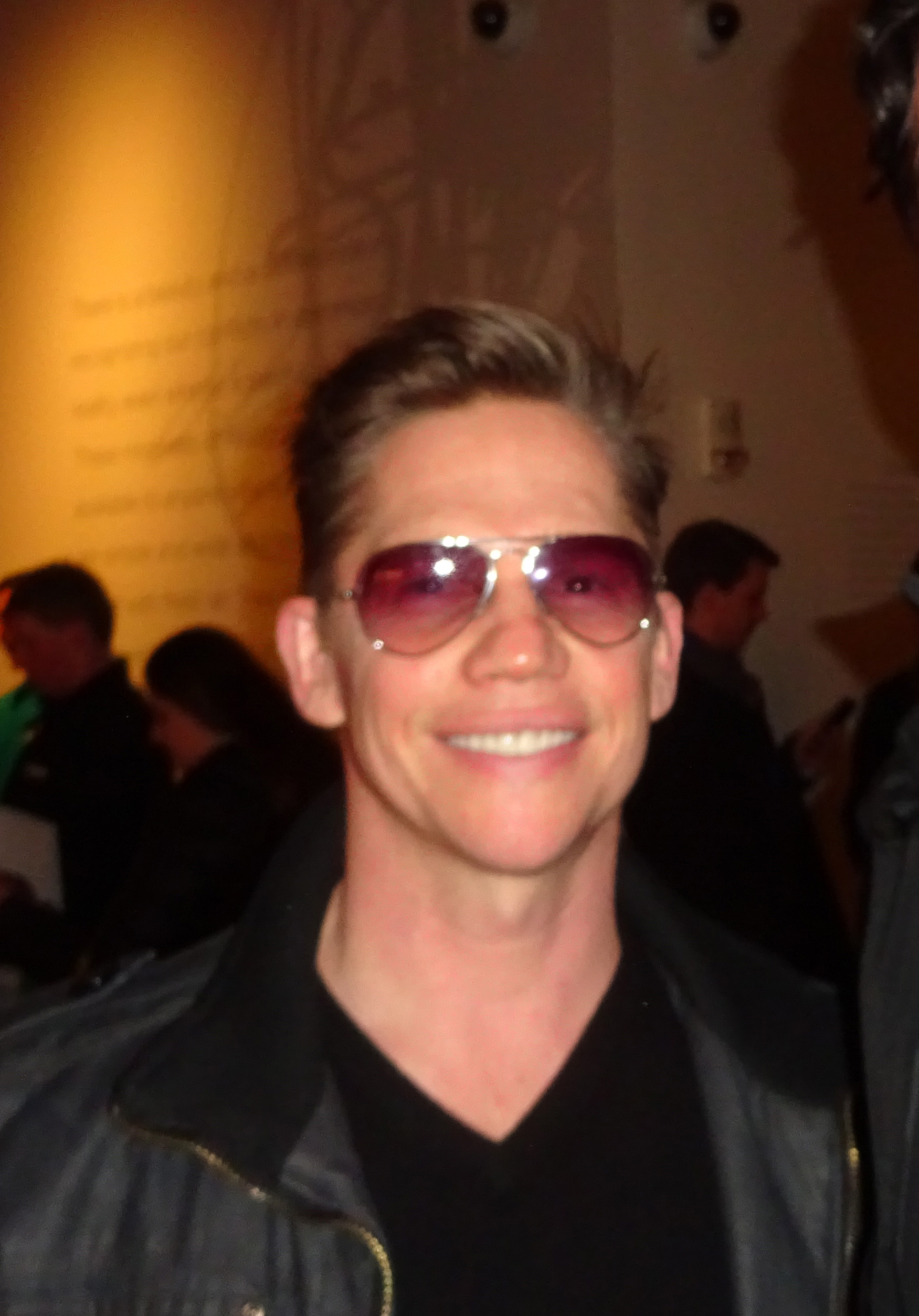
- Noseworthy in Pippin
- Born: Jack Evan Noseworthy Jr. Lynn, Massachusetts, U.S.
- Education: Boston Conservatory (BFA)
- Occupation: Actor
- Years active: 1991–present
- Spouse: Sergio Trujillo (m. 2011)
- Children: 1
- Website: www.jacknoseworthy.com

Jack Evan Noseworthy Jr. is an American actor from Massachusetts. He is known for his roles in films such as Event Horizon, U-571, Barb Wire, and for starring in MTV's Dead at 21. Noseworthy has also appeared on Broadway in musicals, including Jerome Robbins' Broadway and Sweet Smell of Success, and in 2013 portrayed Robert F. Kennedy in the television film Killing Kennedy.

== Early life ==
Noseworthy was born in Lynn, Massachusetts, and grew up there. He began performing at age four in productions at Lynn's Broadway United Methodist Church. He graduated from Lynn English High School in 1982 and later earned a Bachelor of Fine Arts from the Boston Conservatory. He has described his family as union-oriented. His father worked for four decades as an Iron Workers Local 7 member in Boston. Early in his career, Noseworthy joined Actors' Equity and has said that sharing union membership with his father was especially meaningful to them.

== Stage career ==
While still a senior at the Boston Conservatory, Noseworthy began his career in musical theater. In 1988, he joined the national touring production of Cats, and the following year made his Broadway debut as a cast member of Jerome Robbins' Broadway (1989). He was an understudy and during that run, when the principal couldn't perform, he became the first and only male actor to perform as Peter Pan in the anthology's production. He also performed as Mark in A Chorus Line in 1990. In 1993, Noseworthy won the Los Angeles Drama Critics Circle Award for Best Actor for his portrayal of Alan Strang in a Los Angeles production of Equus.

He later returned to Broadway as Dallas in the musical Sweet Smell of Success (2002). In December 2005, Noseworthy originated the role of Armand in the musical Lestat during its pre-Broadway run at the Curran Theatre in San Francisco, but departed the production in its first week of previews and was replaced by his understudy, Drew Sarich. The next year, he co-starred with Meryl Streep in the Public Theater's 2006 production of Mother Courage and Her Children. In 2018, Noseworthy joined the Canadian cast of the hit musical Come from Away, playing the role of Kevin T. In 2025, he made his debut as a Broadway producer, serving as a lead producer of Real Women Have Curves: The Musical on Broadway.

== Film and television career ==
In the early 1990s, Noseworthy began transitioning to on-screen work, appearing as a skateboarder in Encino Man (1992) and landing a recurring role as Adrian Peterman in the CBS sitcom Teech (1991–1992). His breakthrough came when he starred as Ed Bellamy in MTV's action-adventure series Dead at 21 (1994). Around the same time, his film roles included Alive (1993) as Bobby François and S.F.W. (1994) as Joe Dice. In 1994, he also starred as the male love interest in Bon Jovi’s "Always" music video.

Noseworthy went on to play the antagonistic neighbor Eric in The Brady Bunch Movie (1995) and took supporting roles in several cult films: he was seen in Barb Wire (1996) and as Justin in the sci-fi horror Event Horizon (1997). In 2000, he portrayed Seaman Bill Wentz in the WWII submarine thriller U-571 and had a role in John Waters' Cecil B. Demented.

Noseworthy has also made numerous television guest appearances. He had guest or recurring roles on crime and legal dramas, including CSI: Crime Scene Investigation, Law & Order: Special Victims Unit, and Judging Amy. In 2013, he portrayed U.S. Attorney General Robert F. Kennedy in the National Geographic television film Killing Kennedy, acting opposite Rob Lowe's JFK.

== Personal life ==
Noseworthy has been in a relationship with choreographer Sergio Trujillo since 1990. They married in 2011, and have a son born in 2018.

== Filmography ==
=== Film ===
Year	Title	Role	Notes
1992	Encino Man	Taylor, Skater No. 1	
1993	Alive	Bobby François	
1994	S.F.W.	Joe Dice	
1995	The Brady Bunch Movie	Eric Dittmeyer	
1996	Barb Wire	Charlie	
1996	The Trigger Effect	Prowler	
1996	Mojave Moon	Kaiser	
1997	Breakdown	Billy	
1997	Event Horizon	Justin	
1999	Idle Hands	Randy	
1999	The Sterling Chase	Todd	
2000	Clean and Narrow	Buddy	
2000	U-571	Wentz	
2000	Cecil B. Demented	Rodney	
2002	Undercover Brother	Mr. Elias	
2002	Unconditional Love	Andrew	
2004	Poster Boy	Anthony	
2006	Phat Girlz	Richard "Dick" Eckhard	
2007	A Dennis the Menace Christmas	David Bratcher	
2008	Pretty Ugly People	Trevor	
2009	Surrogates	Strickland	
2013	Tio Papi	Benjamin Welling	
2014	Julia	Dr. Sgundud	
2014	The Nurse	Brian	
2015	Pearly Gates	Dan	
2016	10,000 Miles	Charlie	
2017	Needlestick	Boris Whipple	
2017	Ray Meets Helen	Loomis	
2018	Breaking Brooklyn	Christian	
2019	The Hacks	Jim	

=== Television ===
Year	Title	Role	Notes
1991	Teech	Adrian Peterman	12 episodes
1992	American Playhouse	Billy	Episode: "Mrs. Cage"
1993	Bodies of Evidence	David Brooks	Episode: "Shadows"
1994	A Place for Annie	David	Television film
1994	Dead at 21	Ed Bellamy	13 episodes
1996	Relativity	Dean	Episode: "First Impressions"
1999	What We Did That Night	Oliver Larson	Television film
1999	The Outer Limits	Man	Episode: "The Human Operators"
2000	The District	BJ Brownwell	Episode: "The Jackal"
2002	Judging Amy	Jason Lobdel	4 episodes
2003	Crossing Jordan	Detective Jack Hannah	Episode: "Wild Card"
2003, 2015	Law & Order: Special Victims Unit	Matt Baker / Jeremy	2 episodes
2005	Elvis	Steve Binder	2 episodes
2006	CSI: Crime Scene Investigation	Dwight	Episode: "I Like to Watch"
2006	Law & Order	Agent Brian Griggs	Episode: "Fear America"
2008	Aces 'N' Eights	Jess Riley	Television film
2008	Fear Itself	Rory Bemell	Episode: "Spooked"
2013	Killing Kennedy	Robert F. Kennedy	Television film
2014	The Lottery	Alex Richards	Episode: "In Extremis"
2015	The Secret Life of Marilyn Monroe	Alan DeShields	2 episodes
2017	Shades of Blue	Doctor	Episode: "Whoever Fights Monsters"
