= Sean Roberge =

Canadian actor (1972-1996)

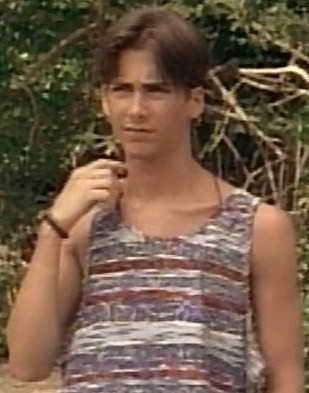
- Born: Sean Brené Roberge; November 1, 1972; Toronto, Ontario, Canada
- Died: July 29, 1996 (aged 23); Canada
- Resting place: Streetsville Public Cemetery in Mississauga Peel Regional Municipality Ontario, Canada
- Years active: 1985-1996

Sean Brené Roberge (November 1, 1972 – July 29, 1996) was a Canadian actor. He began acting in commercials at the age of 8. He is best known for his three-year turn in the series Tarzan playing the role of Roger Taft. He also received a Gemini nomination in 1992 for best actor in a drama for the part of Ralph in the C.B.C.'s Magic Hour episode "The Prom" (1990). Roberge died in a car accident when he was 23.

== Early life and education ==
Roberge was born in Toronto, Ontario, to parents Rene and Brenda Roberge. He was raised in Port Credit and attended Dolphin Senior Public School and, in grade 9, the Cawthra Park Senior Secondary School as part of the Peel regional arts program.

== Acting career ==
He began his acting career aged 8 in commercials, including Kraft, Chrysler, Duncan Hines, and Shell. When he was 13, he scored the guest role of 'Joe Casper' in the second season of T. and T. In 1987, aged 14, he got a part on Fight for Life. Roberge then spent three years playing 'Roger Taft' in the series Tarzan.

He also appeared in John Carpenter's In the Mouth of Madness, Maniac Mansion, Danger Bay, The Campbells, Street Legal, My Secret Identity, Neon Rider, Forever Knight, Tek War, Adderly, Straight Line, Going to War, Road to Avonlea, Katts and Dog, Check It Out!, and Lena: My 100 Children. His last role was as 'Henry Bird' in a 1996 episode of "F/X: The Series".

Roberge provided voices for numerous children's cartoons, including Garbage Pail Kids, Hello Kitty's Furry Tale Theater, Beverly Hills Teens, The New Archies, WildC.A.T.S., Care Bears, Sylvanian Families and Babar. He also played electric guitar with the bands Willy Phosphorus, Days of Heaven and Raunch.

At the 6th Gemini Awards in 1992, Roberge's portrayal of 'Ralph' in the C.B.C.'s Magic Hour episode "The Prom" (1990) earned him a nomination for Best Performance by an Actor in a Leading Role in a Dramatic Program or Mini-Series.

== Death and personal life ==
Roberge was killed in a car accident on July 29, 1996, at the age of 23.
