= USS John C. Stennis =

US Navy Nimitz-class aircraft carrier

USS John C. Stennis (CVN-74)
- USS John C. Stennis underway in the Pacific Ocean

History

United States
- Name: John C. Stennis
- Namesake: John C. Stennis
- Awarded: 30 June 1988
- Builder: Northrop Grumman Newport News
- Cost: $4.5 billion
- Laid down: 13 March 1991
- Launched: 13 November 1993
- Sponsored by: Margaret Jane Stennis Womble
- Christened: 13 November 1993
- Acquired: 9 November 1995
- Commissioned: 9 December 1995
- Home port: Naval Air Station North Island, San Diego, California
- Identification: MMSI number: 368912000; Callsign: NJCS; Hull number: CVN-74
- Motto: Look Ahead, Stay Ahead
- Status: in active service
- Notes: Ship in RCOH (Refueling and Complex Overhaul at Newport News Shipyard in Newport News, Virginia)
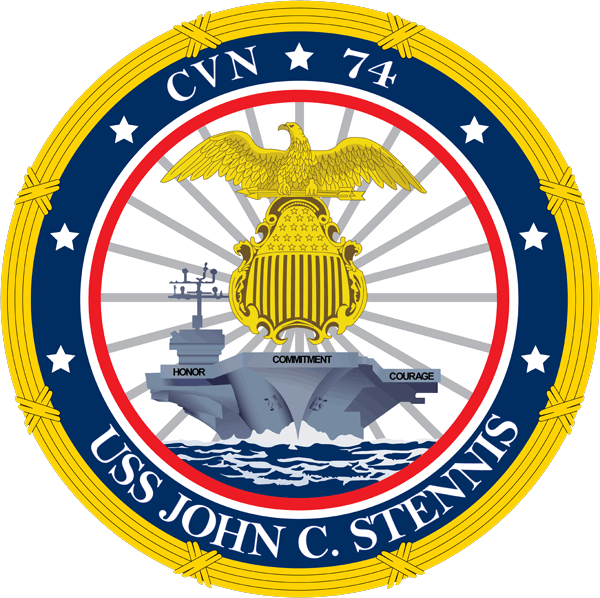
- Badge

General characteristics
- Class & type: Nimitz-class aircraft carrier
- Displacement: 103,300 tons
- Length: Overall: 1,092 ft (332.8 m); Waterline: 1,040 ft (317.0 m)
- Beam: Overall: 252 ft (76.8 m); Waterline: 134 ft (40.8 m)
- Draft: Maximum navigational: 37 ft (11.3 m); Limit: 41 ft (12.5 m)
- Propulsion: 2 × Westinghouse A4W nuclear reactors (HEU 93.5%); 4 × steam turbines; 4 × shafts; 260,000 shp (190 MW)
- Speed: 30 knots (56 km/h; 35 mph)+
- Range: Unlimited distance; 20–25 years
- Capacity: 6,500 officers and crew (with embarked airwing)
- Complement: Ship's company: 3,532; Air wing: 2,480
- Sensors & processing systems: AN/SPS-48E 3-D air search radar; AN/SPS-49(V)5 2-D air search radar; AN/SPQ-9B target acquisition radar; AN/SPN-46 air traffic control radars; AN/SPN-43C air traffic control radar; AN/SPN-41 landing aid radars; 4 × Mk 91 NSSM guidance systems; 4 × Mk 95 radars
- Electronic warfare & decoys: AN/SLQ-32A(V)4 countermeasures suite; SLQ-25A Nixie torpedo countermeasures
- Armament: 2 × Mk 57 Mod3 Sea Sparrow; 2 × RIM-116 Rolling Airframe Missile; 3 × Phalanx CIWS
- Aircraft carried: 90 fixed wing and helicopters
- Aviation facilities: catapults: 4; aircraft elevators: 4

USS John C. Stennis (CVN-74), named for Senator John C. Stennis of Mississippi, is the seventh of the Nimitz-class of nuclear-powered supercarriers in the United States Navy.

She was commissioned on 9 December 1995. Her temporary home port is Norfolk, Virginia, for her scheduled refueling and complex overhaul (RCOH), which began in 2019. After her overhaul is completed in 2026, she is scheduled to return to Bremerton, Washington.

Her RCOH includes a major Sensor upgrade; the AN/SPS-48 is being removed and replaced with the AN/SPY-6(V)2 EASR Rotating Radar. The new radar removes the AN/SPS-49 Radar. The new SPY-6 gives the ship better visibility and tracking capabilities and greatly reduces weight and response times.

== Mission and capabilities ==
The mission of John C. Stennis is to conduct sustained combat air operations. The embarked air wing consists of eight to nine squadrons. Attached aircraft are Navy and Marine Corps F/A-18 Hornet, EA-18G Growler, MH-60R, MH-60S, and E-2C Hawkeye.

The air wing can engage enemy aircraft, submarines, and land targets, or lay mines hundreds of miles from the ship. John C. Stennis's aircraft are used to conduct strikes, support land battles, protect the battle group or other friendly shipping, and implement a sea or air blockade. The air wing provides a visible presence to demonstrate American power and resolve in a crisis. The ship normally operates as the centerpiece of a carrier battle group commanded by a flag officer embarked upon John C. Stennis and consisting of four to six other ships.

John C. Stennis's two nuclear reactors give her virtually unlimited range and endurance and a top speed in excess of 30 knots (56 km/h or 34.5 mph). The ship's four catapults and four arresting gear engines enable her to launch and recover aircraft rapidly and simultaneously. The ship carries approximately 3 million US gallons (11,000 m^{3}) of fuel for her aircraft and escorts, and enough weapons and stores for extended operations without replenishment. John C. Stennis also has extensive repair capabilities, including a fully equipped Aircraft Intermediate Maintenance Department, a micro-miniature electronics repair shop, and numerous ship repair shops.

For defense, in addition to her air wing and accompanying vessels, John C. Stennis has Nato Seasparrow Surface Missile System, Rolling Airframe Missile (RAM), the CIWS Close-in Weapons System for cruise missile defense, and the AN/SLQ-32 Electronic Warfare System.

== History ==
The nuclear-powered USS John C. Stennis (CVN 74) was contracted on 29 March 1988, and the keel was laid on 13 March 1991 at Newport News Shipbuilding, Newport News, Virginia.

The ship was christened on 11 November 1993, in honor of Senator John Cornelius Stennis (D-Mississippi) who served in the Senate from 1947 to 1989. The daughter of the ship's namesake, Mrs. Margaret Stennis-Womble, was the ship's sponsor. John C. Stennis was commissioned on 9 December 1995 at Naval Station Norfolk, Virginia.

She conducted flight deck certification in January 1996. The first arrested landing was by a VX-23 F-14B. The ship conducted numerous carrier qualifications and independent steaming exercises off the East Coast throughout the next two years. Included among these events was the first carrier landing of an F/A-18E/F Super Hornet on 18 January 1997.

=== 1998 ===
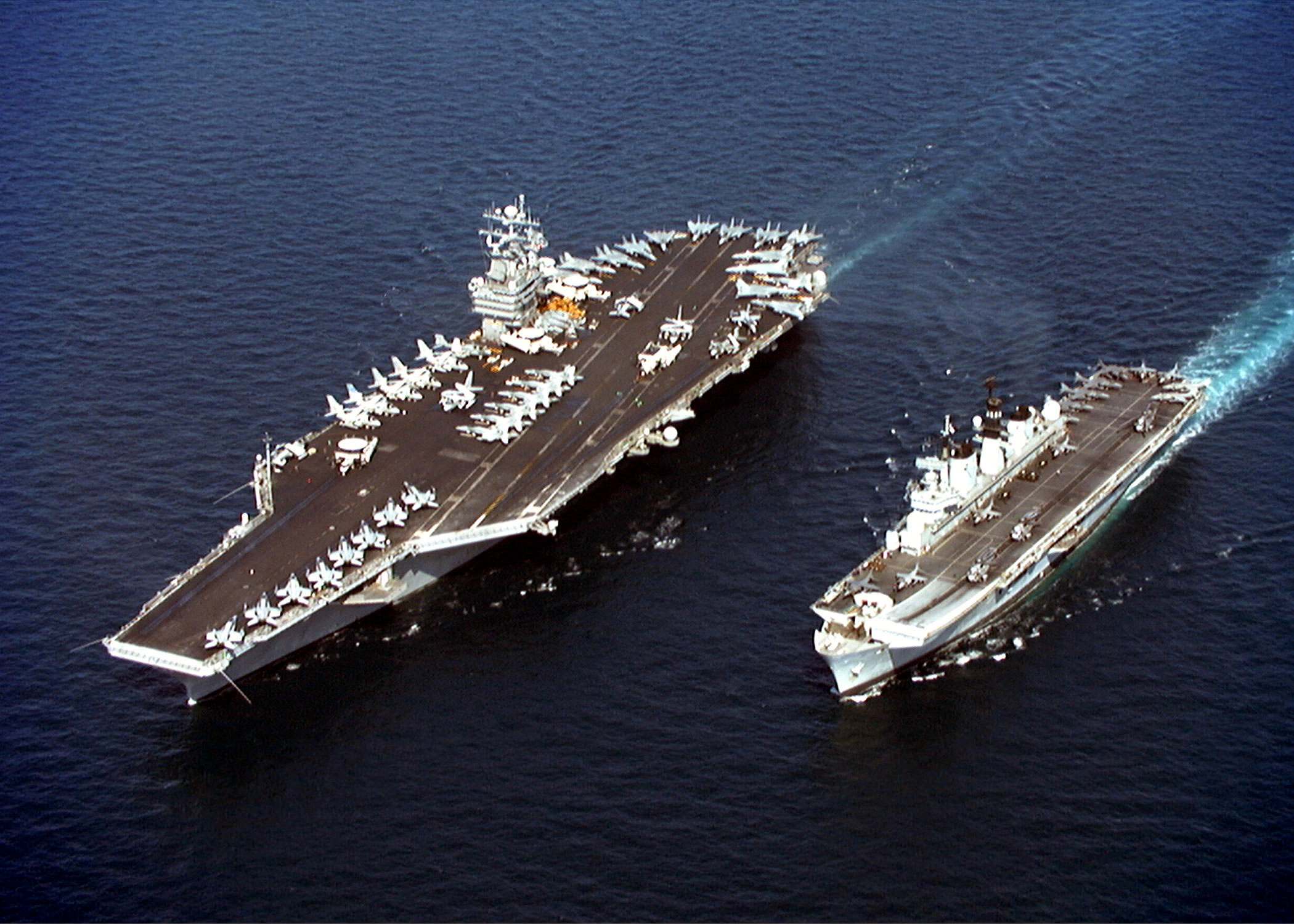
USS John C. Stennis (Left) and the British Invincible-class HMS Illustrious (right) operating together, April 1998.

On 26 February 1998 with Carrier Air Wing Seven embarked, John C. Stennis left Norfolk for her maiden deployment, transiting the Suez Canal on 7 March and arriving in the Persian Gulf on 11 March 1998. The ship traveled 8,020 nmi (14,850 km; 9,230 mi) in 274 hours, an average speed of 29.4 knots (54.4 km/h; 33.8 mph) to relieve USS George Washington in conducting Operation Southern Watch missions.

John C. Stennis departed the Persian Gulf on 19 July 1998 for her new home port of Naval Air Station North Island in San Diego, California, arriving on 26 August 1998. In October 1998, she entered a six-month maintenance and upgrade period at North Island, returning to sea in April 1999. During the maintenance period, a jet blast deflector collapsed, severely injuring two sailors.

=== 1999 ===
In May 1999, the ship ran aground in a shallow area adjacent to the turning basin near North Island. Silt clogged the intake pipes to the steam condensing systems for the nuclear reactor plants, causing the carrier's two nuclear reactors to be shut down (one reactor by crew, the other automatically) for a period of 45 minutes. She was towed back to her pier for maintenance and observation for the next two days. The cleanup cost was about $2 million.

=== 2000 ===
On 7 January 2000, John C. Stennis deployed to the Persian Gulf to relieve USS John F. Kennedy in Operation Southern Watch. During the deployment, the ship made port visits to South Korea, Hong Kong, Malaysia, Bahrain, the United Arab Emirates, Australia, Tasmania and Pearl Harbor, before returning to San Diego on 3 July 2000.

=== 2001 ===
On 21 May 2001, the ship served as "the world's largest and most expensive outdoor theater" for the world premiere of the Disney film Pearl Harbor. More than 2,000 people attended the premiere on the ship, which had special grandstand seating and one of the world's largest movie screens assembled on the flight deck.

Following the September 11 attacks, John C. Stennis conducted Noble Eagle missions off the U.S. West Coast. In 2000 and 2001, John C. Stennis was part of Carrier Group 7.

On 12 November 2001, two months earlier than scheduled, the ship left on her third deployment to the U.S. Fifth Fleet area of responsibility in support of Operation Enduring Freedom, returning to San Diego on 28 May 2002. From June 2002 to January 2003, JCS underwent a seven-month Planned Incremental Availability (PIA).

=== 2004 ===
From 24 May to 1 November 2004, John C. Stennis conducted her fourth major overseas deployment, participating in Exercise Northern Edge 2004 in the Gulf of Alaska, Rim of the Pacific (RimPac) Exercise off Hawaii, exercises with Kitty Hawk off Japan and goodwill visits to Japan, Malaysia and Western Australia. Shortly after returning from deployment to San Diego, JCS changed her home port to Naval Station Bremerton, Washington, on 19 January 2005. Once at Bremerton, John C. Stennis underwent an 11-month docking planned incremental availability (DPIA), the first time she had been dry-docked since commissioning.

Upgrades included a new mast. The new mast's structure is the first of its kind. A new type of steel alloy was used, making it stiffer and thicker than before. The new mast is heavier and taller, allowing it to support new antennae the old mast would not have been able to support. Other upgrades included the installation of a new integrated bridge system in the pilothouse that will save manpower and provide state-of-the-art displays.

Following the maintenance cycle and pre-deployment training exercises, the carrier returned to Bremerton, Washington, and the carrier was certified surge ready, meaning the ship maintained a high state of readiness in case of an unscheduled deployment.

=== 2007 ===
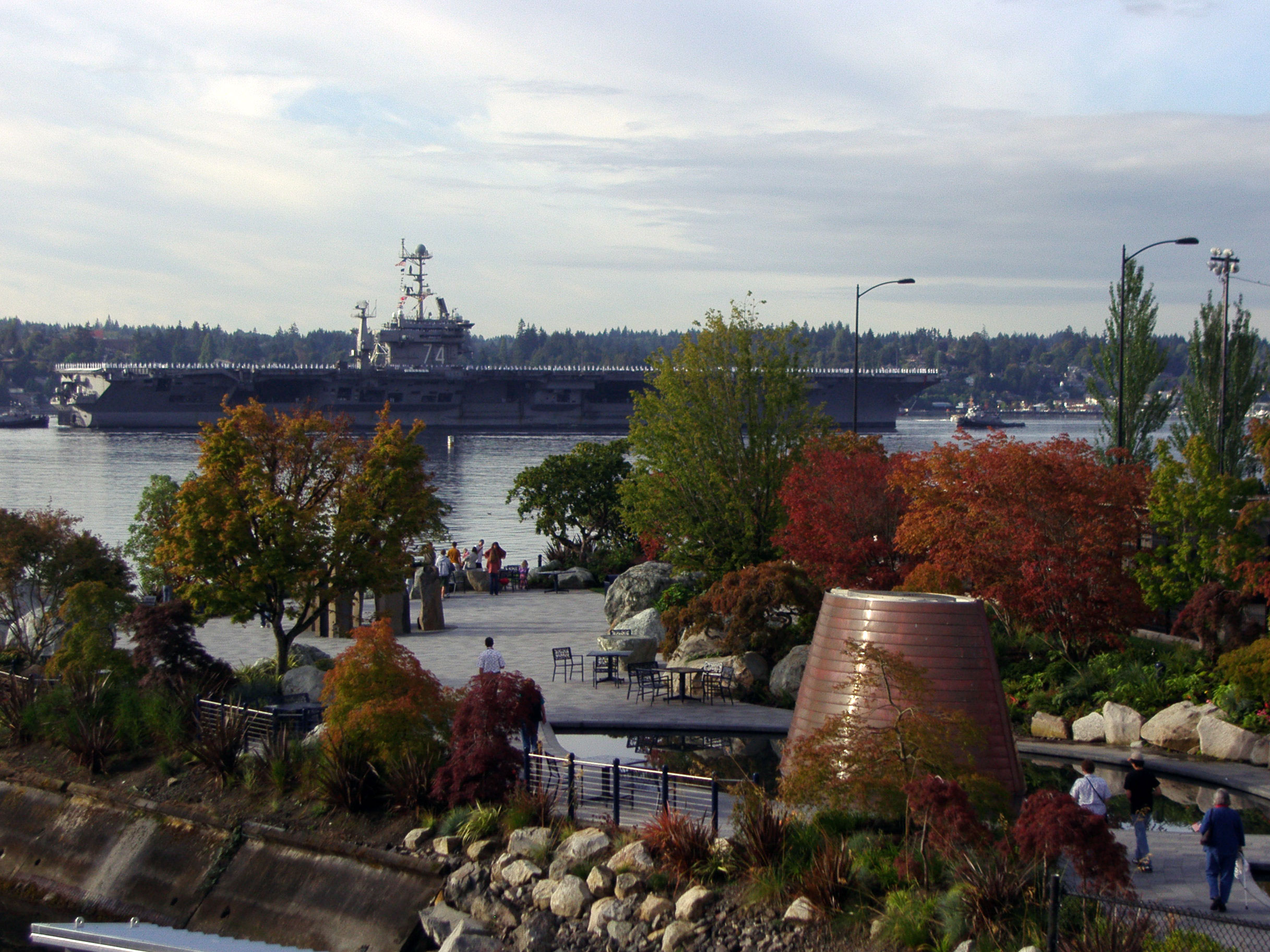
USS John C. Stennis arrives in Bremerton on 31 August 2007.

On 16 January 2007, the carrier and her group set sail for the Persian Gulf as part of an increase in US military presence. John C. Stennis arrived in the area on 19 February 2007, joining USS Dwight D. Eisenhower in the United States Fifth Fleet area of operations. This marked the first time since 2003 that there were two aircraft carrier battle groups in the region simultaneously.

On 23 May 2007, John C. Stennis, along with eight other warships including the aircraft carrier Nimitz and amphibious assault ship Bonhomme Richard, passed through the Strait of Hormuz. US Navy officials said it was the largest such move since 2003.

On 31 August 2007 John C. Stennis returned to Bremerton.

=== 2009 ===
John C. Stennis departed Bremerton for a 6-month deployment to the western Pacific on 13 January 2009. On 24 April, the ship arrived in Singapore. That same day, one of the ship's sailors was crushed and killed while working from a small harbor boat to secure a drain that discharges oily water from the aircraft catapults.

On 29 April, the ship's executive officer, Commander David L. Burnham, was relieved by Rear Admiral Mark A. Vance over unspecified personal conduct. Burnham was reassigned to a base in San Diego, pending an investigation.

After participating in exercises with Japan Maritime Self Defense Force and the Republic of Korea, as well as joint exercise Northern Edge 2009, John C. Stennis returned from deployment in early July 2009. Carrier Air Wing 9 debarked on 6 July at NAS North Island, prior to the ship's arrival at her homeport of Bremerton on 10 July.

=== 2011 ===
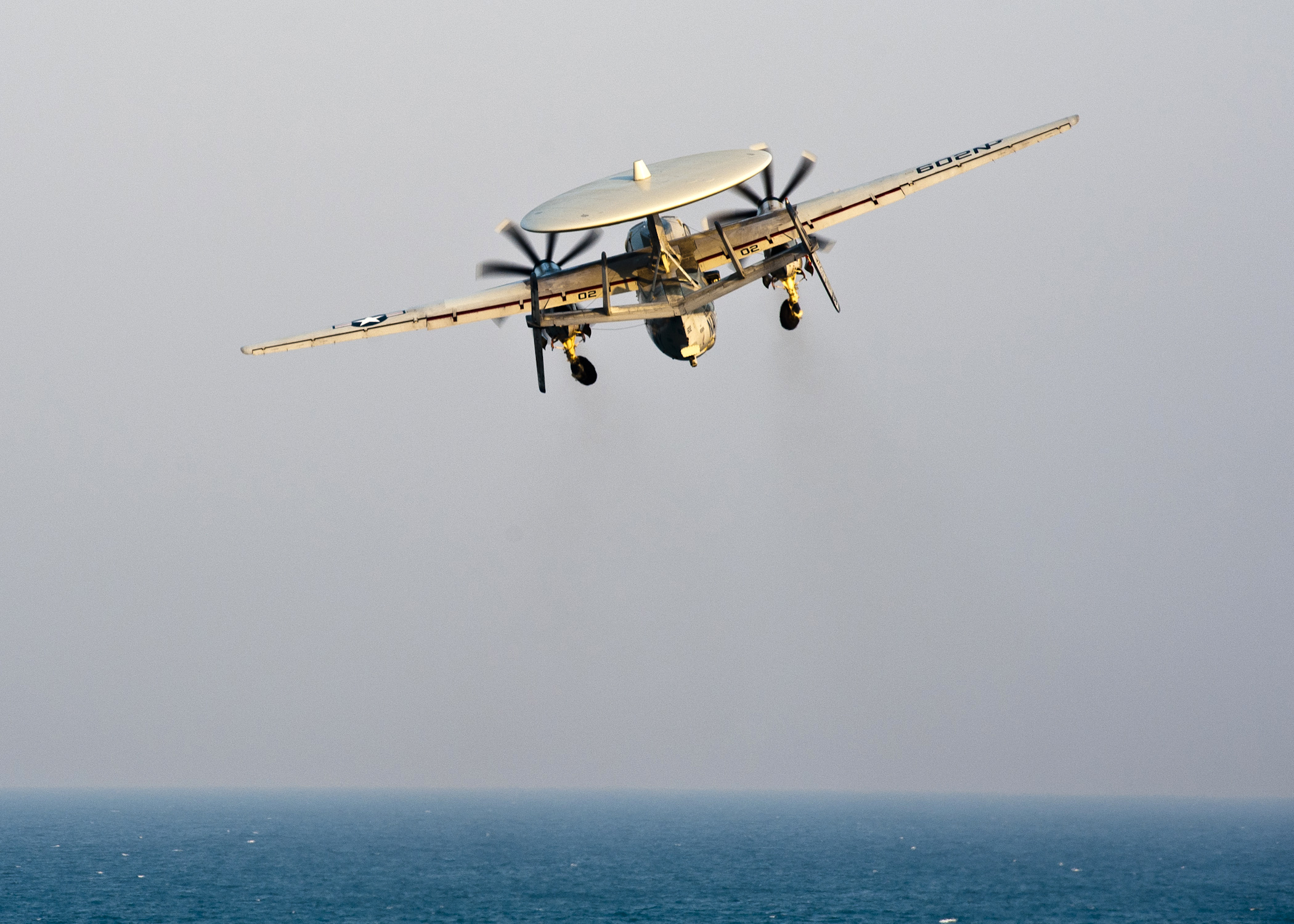
The final command-and-control mission for U.S. forces over Iraq, 18 December 2011

On 30 March 2011, a VMFAT-101 F/A-18C Hornet suffered an uncontained catastrophic engine failure, exploded and caught fire just before launch from John C. Stennis about 100 miles (160 km) off the coast of San Diego during launch and recovery training operations. The aircraft was at full power, in tension on the catapult when the accident occurred. Eleven flight deck crewmen were injured while the pilot was unhurt. There was no major damage to the carrier but the aircraft was a total loss.

On 18 December 2011, the final command-and-control mission for U.S. forces over Iraq was flown by an E-2C Hawkeye (pictured) from Carrier Airborne Early Warning Squadron 112 (VAW-112), catapulting off the carrier John C. Stennis at 7:32 am and returning at 11:04 a.m, both local time. This mission effectively ended U.S. naval support for Operation New Dawn.

=== 2012 ===
On 3 January 2012, Iranian General Ataollah Salehi warned John C. Stennis "not to return to the Persian Gulf." The United States dismissed the warning.

On 7 January, John C. Stennis led the rescue of an Iranian-flagged fishing vessel, Al Mulahi, following her seizure by pirates. The pirates ambushed the ship and Iranian flag to search for other ships to hijack, while holding the original crew hostage. When some of the pirates attempted to board a Bahamian-flagged cargo ship, Sunshine, she radioed for assistance. John C. Stennis dispatched a helicopter and cruiser to assist. A boarding party captured the pirates who attacked Sunshine, fed them, then released them temporarily. A helicopter then secretly followed the pirates back to their mother ship, Al Mulahi. Crew from the destroyer USS Kidd then boarded the fishing vessel, upon permission in Urdu from the captain, and arrested all of the pirates with no casualties.

On 2 March 2012, John C. Stennis returned home from her 7-month deployment to homeport Bremerton, Washington.

On 7 July 2012, crew members were informed that John C. Stennis would be returning to the Middle East in August, much sooner than expected.

On 27 August 2012, John C. Stennis departed to the Middle East originally for six months, but was extended to eight.

=== 2013 ===
On 1 April 2013, the ship arrived at Changi Naval Base in Singapore. Local ITE students were invited for a guided tour inside the aircraft carrier.

Following that the ship sailed to Pearl Harbor, where she performed a week long tiger cruise to San Diego

At 12:45 on 3 May 2013, John C. Stennis arrived at her home port of Naval Base Kitsap in Bremerton, Washington, the completion of a ten-month, 66,000 miles (106,000 km) deployment to the western Pacific Ocean. During this deployment, squadron aircraft flew more than 1,300 sorties from the carrier's deck in the war in Afghanistan.

On 27 June, the ship entered Dry Dock at Puget Sound Naval Shipyard and Intermediate Maintenance Facility (PSNS & IMF) to begin her scheduled 16 month Docking Planned Incremental Availability (DPIA). Work included preserving and painting the ship's hull, upgrading the propulsion plant, refurbishing the crew's berthing compartments, and a complete replacement of the ship's computer networks and work stations.

=== 2014 ===
John C. Stennis completed her Docking Planned Incremental Availability (DPIA) on 5 November 2014. After a six-day sea trial, the ship certified on 10 November as a Naval Operational asset.

=== 2015 ===
In mid-January 2015, John C. Stennis departed her home port of Naval Base Kitsap in Bremerton, Washington, and arrived at Naval Magazine Indian Island to load munitions prior to departing for San Diego to receive aircraft and another 2,000 sailors. On 1 September, the carrier arrived back at Bremerton, Washington.

=== 2016 ===
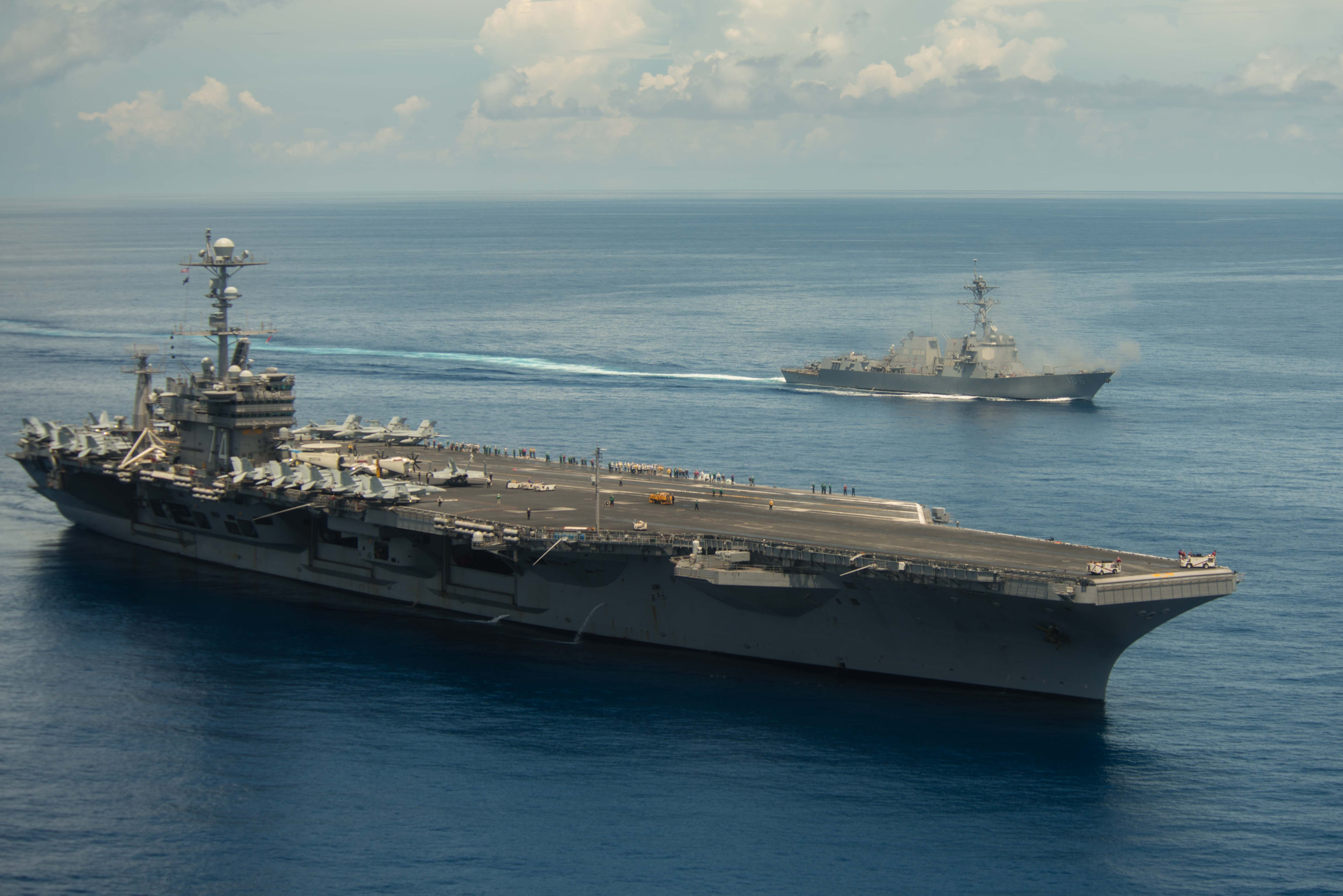
John C. Stennis with destroyer Stockdale, 17 May 2016.

On 15 January 2016, John C. Stennis left Naval Base Kitsap for a scheduled deployment to the Western Pacific. On 19 April she arrived to Singapore for a regularly scheduled port visit after completing an annual bilateral training exercise in the Philippines. On 26 April 2016, China denied John C. Stennis, and her escort ships, permission to make a port visit to Hong Kong.

On 10 August, the carrier arrived in San Diego, California, for offload and disembarkation of CVW-9. On 14 August, John C. Stennis arrived back to homeport, Naval Base Kitsap, finishing a Western Pacific deployment and RIMPAC exercise.

=== 2017 ===
From February to August 2017, John C. Stennis was in overhaul at the Puget Sound Naval Shipyard.

=== 2018 ===
On 2 August 2018, the Navy announced that John C. Stennis would change homeport to Norfolk, Virginia in advance of her refueling and complex overhaul (RCOH) at Newport News Shipbuilding. USS Carl Vinson will move from San Diego to Naval Base Kitsap to go through a period of maintenance at Puget Sound and USS Abraham Lincoln will replace Carl Vinson at San Diego.

On 12 December 2018, John C. Stennis launched her first combat sorties in support of Operation Freedom's Sentinel in Afghanistan. On 29 December 2018, John C. Stennis launched her first combat sorties in support of Operation Inherent Resolve in Iraq and Syria.

=== 2019 ===
On 16 May 2019, John C. Stennis arrived in her new home port of Norfolk, Virginia in preparation for her refueling and complex overhaul (RCOH) in 2020. RCOH is expected to be completed sometime in the mid-2020s.

On 16 Dec 2019, John C. Stennis hosted a plank owners reunion on board in Norfolk, VA.

=== 2021–present ===
On 7 May 2021, John C. Stennis went into Newport News for her midlife Refuel and Complex Overhaul (RCOH). The overhaul is expected to be completed by October 2026.

With more than 25 million man hours going into upgrading the Stennis, the upcoming outfitting and testing phase will allow shipbuilders to complete the overhaul and installation of the ship's major components and test its electronics, combat, and propulsion systems. This period will also focus on improving the ship's living areas and the general quality of life for the sailors, including crew living spaces, galleys, and mess decks.

== Ship's seal ==
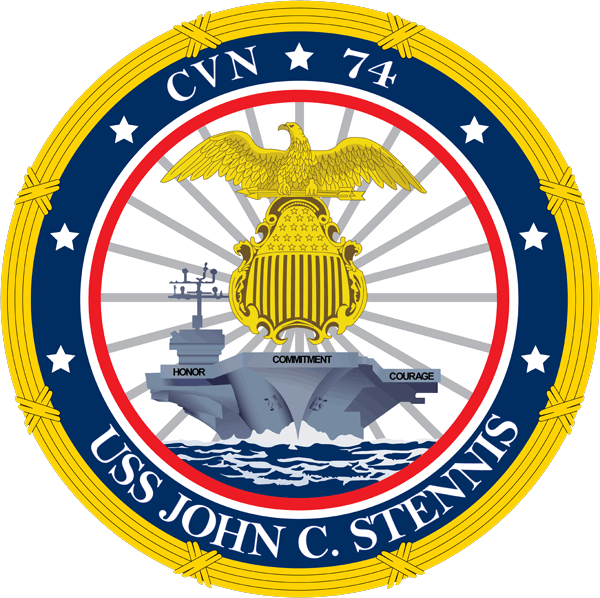
The emblem of the USS John Stennis CVN-74

John C. Stennis's seal was produced from the combined efforts of several crew members with historical help from the Stennis Center for Public Service, John C. Stennis Space Center and the United States Senate Historian. The seal implies peace through strength, just as Senator John C. Stennis was referred to as an "unwavering advocate of peace through strength" by President Ronald Reagan, when the ship's name was announced in June 1988.

The circular shape signifies the Nimitz-class aircraft carrier's unique capability to circle the world without refueling, while providing a forward presence from the sea. The predominant colors are red, white, blue and gold, the same as those of the United States and the Navy. The outer border, taken from one version of a U.S. Senate crest, represents the strength through unity of the ship's crew.

The four gold bands and eight ties denote John C. Stennis' four decades (41 years) in the Senate and the eight presidents he served with, from President Truman to President Reagan. The seven stars in the blue border represent his seven terms in the Senate, and John C. Stennis as the seventh Nimitz-class aircraft carrier. The red and white stripes inside the blue border represent the American flag and the American people John C. Stennis serves. They also honor the courage and sacrifice of the United States' armed forces.

The eagle and shield is a representation of the gilt eagle and shield overlooking the Old Senate Chamber. The shield represents the United States of America. The twenty stars represent the US's twentieth state, Mississippi, the home of John C. Stennis. The three arrows in the eagle's talons symbolize the ship's and air wing's ability to project power.

The burst of light emanating from the shield, representative of the emergence of a new nation in the United States Senate Seal, portrays the birth of over 25 major Naval Aviation programs under Senator Stennis' leadership, including all aircraft carriers from USS Forrestal to USS Harry S. Truman, and aircraft from the F-4 Phantom to the F/A-18 Hornet. The eagle is representative of John C. Stennis' stature in the Senate, where he was respected and admired as a "soaring eagle" by some of his colleagues.

The ship herself is pictured in the seal. On the edges of the flight deck are the words "Honor, Courage, Commitment" which are the United States Navy's Core Values.

The seal, after selection by the ship's crew, was submitted to Mrs. Margaret Stennis Womble, the ship's sponsor and daughter of Senator Stennis, and to Mrs. John Hampton Stennis, the matron of honor and wife of Senator Stennis' son, for their approval. In February 1995 they approved the design.

== Ship's name controversy ==
The ship's name was originally approved by then-president Ronald Reagan in 1988. In 2021, the ship's name was the subject of renewed controversy due to Senator Stennis's outspoken opposition to civil rights and racial equality, and his extensive record of legislative support for racial segregation. The controversy is part of a larger reassessment of military bases, ships and other U.S. military assets named after Confederate generals and other persons associated with slavery and racial segregation.

== In fiction ==
John C. Stennis was used and featured in Transformers: Revenge of the Fallen and World War Z.

The ship carried a dead kaiju in the 2013 film Pacific Rim.

It was briefly featured in the Intro to NCIS.

In the military aviation simulation game Digital Combat Simulator, it is included as a free-to-use aircraft carrier, including launch and recovery operations through it.

The John Stennis carrier was one of the locations featured in Tom Clancy's Debt of Honor, released in August 1994.

== See also ==
- List of aircraft carriers
- List of aircraft carriers of the United States Navy
