= Margot Grahame =

British actress (1911–1982)

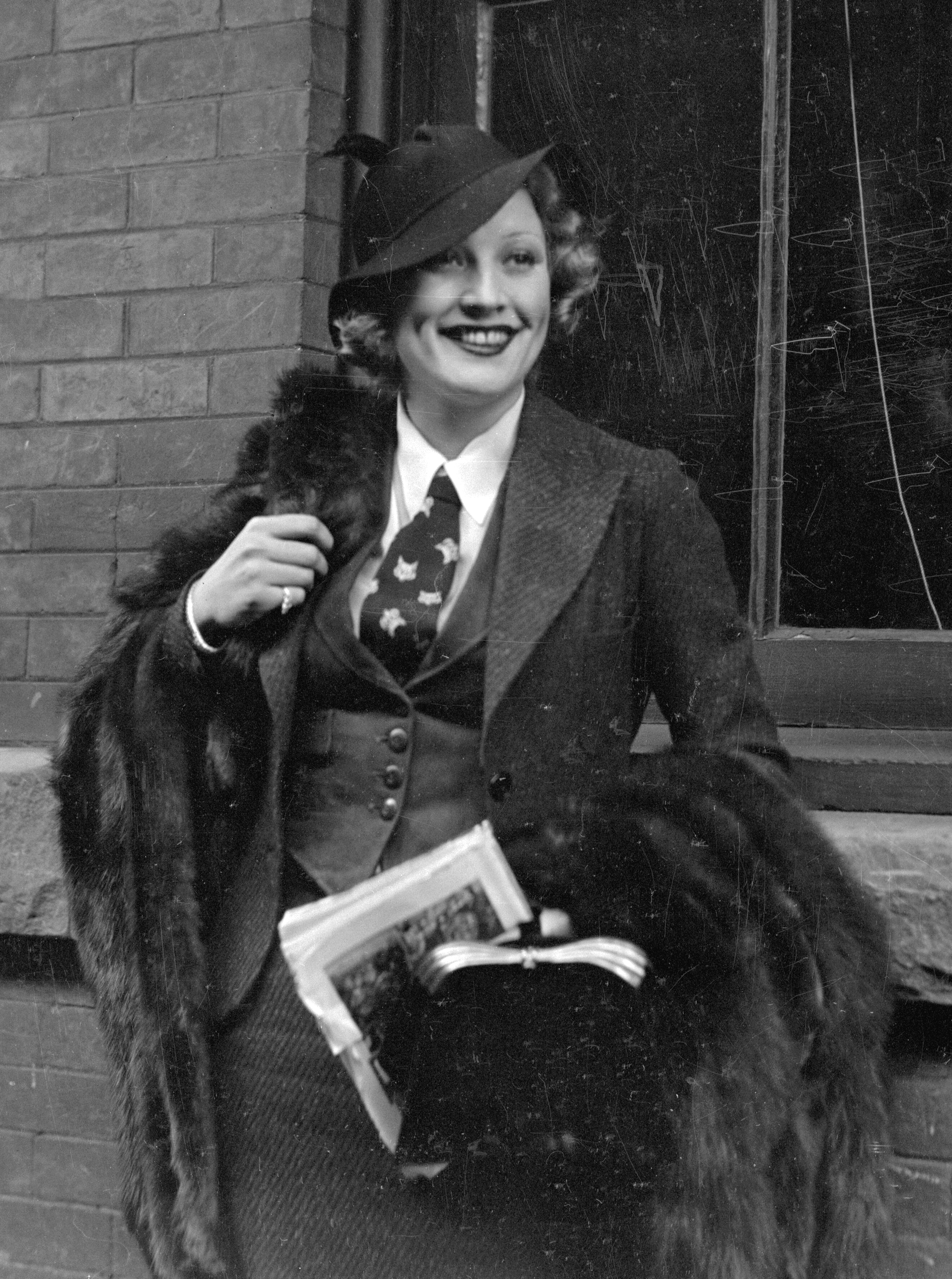
- Margot Grahame in the late 1930s
- Born: Margaret Clark; 20 February 1911; Canterbury, Kent, England
- Died: 1 January 1982 (aged 70); London, England
- Occupation: Actress
- Years active: 1930–1958
- Spouses: Francis Lister (m. 1934; div. 1936) Allan McMartin (m. 1938; div. 1946)
- Partner: A. D. Peters (1958–1973)

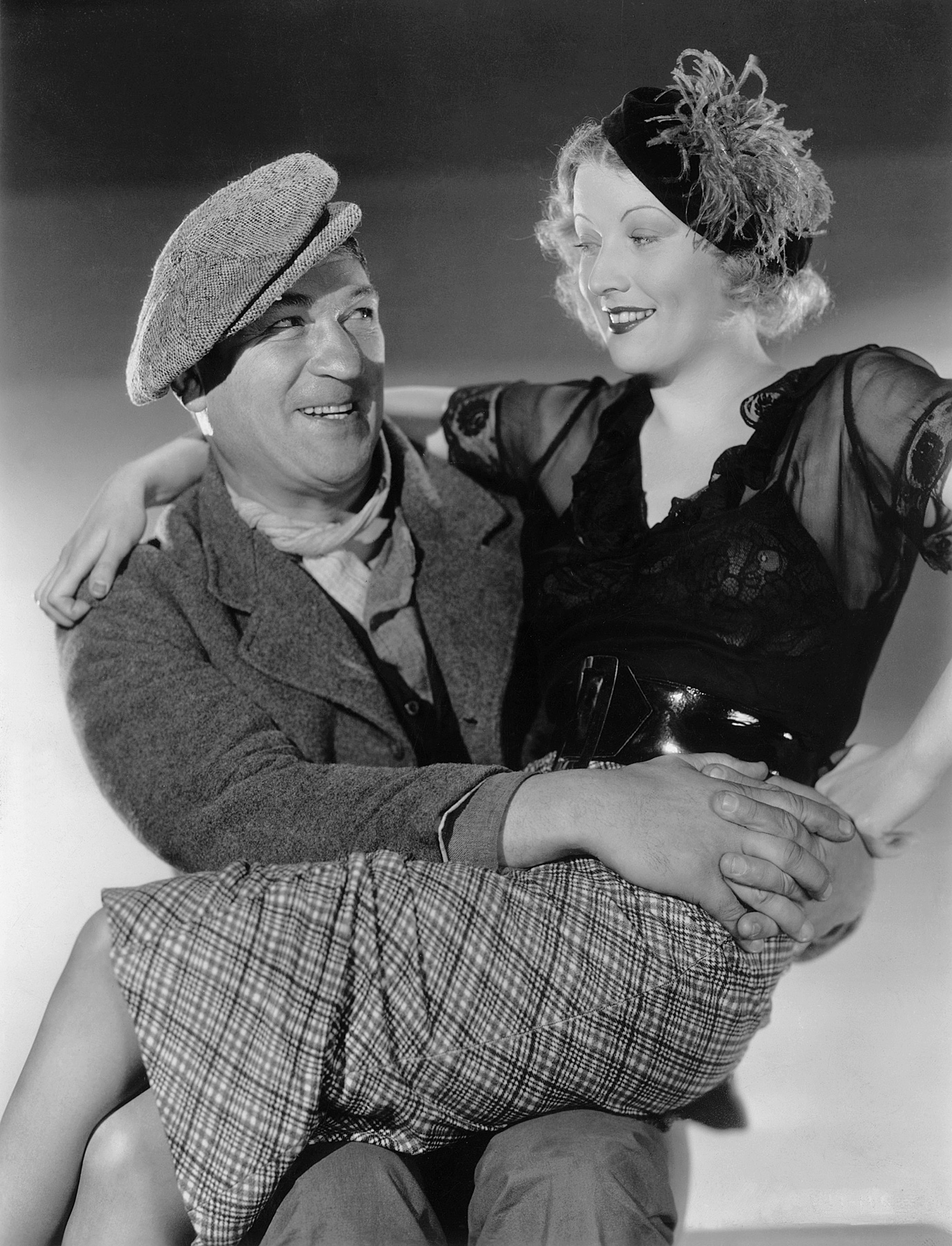
With Victor McLaglen in John Ford's The Informer (1935)

Margot Grahame (born Margaret Clark; 20 February 1911 – 1 January 1982) was an English actress most noted for starring in The Informer (1935) and The Three Musketeers (1935). She started acting in 1930 and made her last screen appearance in 1958.

== Film actress ==
Her family went to South Africa when she was three years old, which led to her being educated there. She began her stage career in Pretoria, with Dennis Neilson-Terry, a few weeks after leaving school at the age of 14. She made her London stage debut in 1927 as understudy to Mary Glynne in The Terror. Her screen debut was in the 1930 film Rookery Nook.

During the early 1930s, Grahame was gradually becoming a popular actress in Britain. Hollywood producers were impressed that, in only three years, she had appeared in 42 major roles in British films. After she went to America, she was signed to a long-term contract with RKO and performed in a number of movies from the mid-1930s to the late 1950s.

She appeared as the prostitute girlfriend of Gypo Nolan in John Ford's The Informer (1935). She followed this performance with a role as Milady de Winter in The Three Musketeers (1935). She was reunited with Walter Abel, her leading man in The Three Musketeers, a dozen years later in The Fabulous Joe (1947), which was produced by Bebe Daniels. As the character Emily Terkle, Grahame was appearing in her first film since The Buccaneer (1938). Starring opposite Fredric March, Grahame faced the challenge of playing the love interest rather than a siren. She appeared in The Romantic Age in 1949.

Her last films were made in the 1950s and included I'll Get You for This (1951) starring George Raft and Coleen Gray, The Crimson Pirate (1952) starring Burt Lancaster, The Beggar's Opera (1953), Orders Are Orders (1954) and Saint Joan (1957) with Jean Seberg in the titular role. She also appeared in "The Sweater" (1958), an episode of The New Adventures of Charlie Chan (1958).

== Personal life ==
Grahame moved into a home in the Hollywood Hills after her separation from British actor Francis Lister in 1935. She married Canadian millionaire Allen McMartin in 1938. They divorced in 1946. In 1948, Grahame began a relationship with the British literary agent A. D. Peters that continued until his death in 1973.

In her later years, she was reportedly "full of bitter regret and resentment" at, amongst other things, the fact that Peters had never married her.

== Death ==
In her old age, Grahame was "bloated" and had her hair coloured, in her own words, "'red as flaming fires of hell'". Her housekeeper at the time of her death was Lily (née Budge), wife of the impoverished 13th Earl of Galloway. Grahame died in London on New Year's Day of 1982, aged 70, from chronic bronchitis. She had no survivors and was cremated.

== Partial filmography ==
- Rookery Nook (1930) - Clara Popkiss
- Compromising Daphne (1930) - Muriel
- The Love Habit (1931) - Julie Bubois
- Uneasy Virtue (1931) - Stella Tolhurst
- Glamour (1931) - Lady Betty Enfield
- The Rosary (1931) - Mary Edwards
- Creeping Shadows (1931) - Gloria Paget
- The Innocents of Chicago (1932) - Lil
- Stamboul (1932) - Countess Elsa Talven
- Illegal (1932) - Dorothy Turner
- Forging Ahead (1933) - Crystal Grey
- Timbuctoo (1933) - Elizabeth
- Yes, Mr Brown (1933) - Clary Baumann
- Prince of Arcadia (1933) - Mirana
- I Adore You (1933) - Margot Grahame
- Sorrell and Son (1933) - Mrs. Dora Sorrell
- House of Dreams (1933)
- Without You (1934) - Margot Gilbey
- The Broken Melody (1934) - Simone St. Cloud
- Easy Money (1934)
- Falling in Love (1935) - June Desmond
- The Informer (1935) - Katie Madden
- The Arizonian (1935) - Kitty Rivers
- The Three Musketeers (1935) - Milady de Winter
- Two in the Dark (1936) - Marie Smith
- Counterfeit (1936) - Aimee Maxwell
- Crime Over London (1936) - Pearl - Gang-Moll
- Make Way for a Lady (1936) - Valerie Broughton
- Night Waitress (1936) - Helen Roberts
- Criminal Lawyer (1937) - Madge Carter
- The Soldier and the Lady (1937) - Zangarra
- Fight for Your Lady (1937) - Marcia Trent
- The Buccaneer (1938) - Annette de Remy
- The Hal Roach Comedy Carnival (1947) - Emily Terkle, in 'Fabulous Joe'
- The Fabulous Joe (1947) - Emily Terkel
- Forever Amber (1947) - Bess (scenes deleted)
- Broken Journey (1948) - Joanna Dane
- Black Magic (1949) - Mme. du Barry
- The Romantic Age (1949) - Helen Dickson
- I'll Get You for This (1951) - Mrs. Langley (uncredited)
- The Crimson Pirate (1952) - Bianca
- Venetian Bird (1952) - Rosa Melitus
- The Beggar's Opera (1953) - The Actress
- Orders Are Orders (1954) - Wanda Sinclair
- Saint Joan (1957) - Duchesse de la Tremouille
