= Douwes =

Douwes is a surname. Notable people with the surname include:

- Pia Douwes (born 1964), Dutch actress
- Eduard Douwes Dekker (1820–1887), Dutch novelist and writer
- Ernest Douwes Dekker (1879–1950), Indonesian politician
- Brian Douwes (born 1987), Dutch kickboxer
