= Two in the Dark =

1936 film by Benjamin Stoloff

- Directed by: Benjamin Stoloff
- Screenplay by: Willis Goldbeck; Seton I. Miller
- Based on: Two O'Clock Courage; 1934 novel by Gelett Burgess
- Produced by: Zion Myers
- Starring: Walter Abel; Margot Grahame; Wallace Ford; Gail Patrick; Alan Hale
- Cinematography: Nicholas Musuraca
- Edited by: George Crone
- Music by: Alberto Colombo
- Production company: RKO Pictures
- Distributed by: RKO Pictures
- Release date: January 10, 1936
- Running time: 74 minutes
- Country: United States
- Language: English

Two in the Dark is a 1936 American mystery film directed by Benjamin Stoloff and starring Walter Abel, Margot Grahame, Wallace Ford, Gail Patrick, and Alan Hale. The screenplay concerns an amnesiac suspected of murder.

In 1945, Stoloff produced a remake, Two O'Clock Courage, directed by Anthony Mann and starring Tom Conway and Ann Rutherford.

== Plot ==
Wandering around in the darkness, an amnesiac has the feeling that he's murdered someone. He reads that a theatrical producer has been killed and he thinks that he's guilty. However, unemployed actress Marie Smith, whom he meets while wandering around the park, isn't convinced, so she helps him reconstruct the clues and find the killer.

== Cast ==
- Walter Abel as Ford Adams
- Margot Grahame as Marie Smith
- Wallace Ford as Harry Hillyer
- Gail Patrick as Irene Lassiter
- Alan Hale as Police Inspector Florio
- Leslie Fenton as Stuart Eldredge
- Eric Blore as Edmund Fish
- Erin O'Brien-Moore as Olga Konar
- Erik Rhodes as Carlo Gheet
- J. Carrol Naish as Burt Mansfield
- Addison Randall as Duke Reed
- Ward Bond as Policeman in Park

== Critical reception ==
The Film Daily described it as an "ingenious murder mystery", and wrote, "The clever unravelling of the mystery holds you tense to the final scene. The honors go to the author for a very unusual plot, ably seconded by smart direction and a very competent cast throughout."
