= The Three Musketeers (1935 film) =

1935 film by Otto Brower, Rowland V. Lee

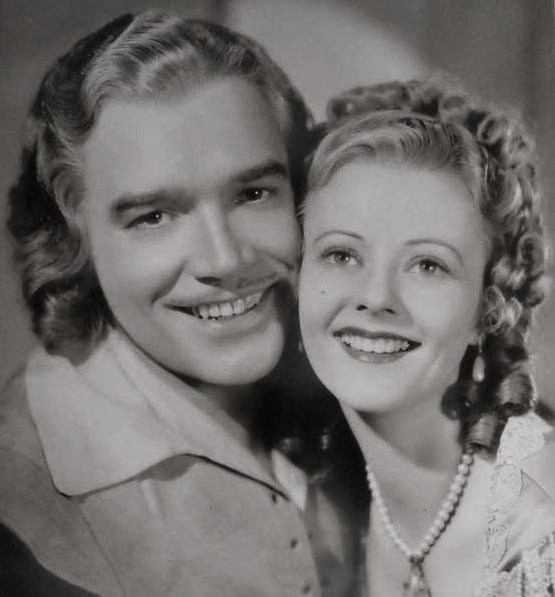
- Walter Abel and Heather Angel
- Directed by: Rowland V. Lee
- Screenplay by: Rowland V. Lee; Dudley Nichols
- Based on: The Three Musketeers; 1844 novel by Alexandre Dumas
- Produced by: Cliff Reid (associate producer)
- Starring: Walter Abel; Heather Angel; Ian Keith; Margot Grahame; Paul Lukas; Moroni Olsen; Onslow Stevens
- Cinematography: J. Peverell Marley
- Edited by: George Hively
- Music by: Max Steiner
- Production company: RKO Radio Pictures
- Distributed by: RKO Radio Pictures
- Release date: November 1, 1935
- Running time: 93-97 minutes
- Country: United States
- Language: English
- Budget: $512,000
- Box office: $900,000

The Three Musketeers is a 1935 film directed by Rowland V. Lee and starring Walter Abel, Heather Angel, Ian Keith, Margot Grahame, and Paul Lukas. It is the first English-language talking picture version of Alexandre Dumas's 1844 novel The Three Musketeers.

== Plot ==
Callow youth d'Artagnan sets off from Gascony for Paris, armed with his father's sword, an old horse and a letter of introduction to his godfather, Captain de Treville, commander of the King's Musketeers. Along the way, he attempts to rescue Milady de Winter from highwaymen, but it turns out she came to meet their leader, the Count de Rochefort. When Rochefort insults d'Artagnan, the latter insists on a duel. Instead, Rochefort has his men knock out d'Artagnan, while he blackmails Lady de Winter into helping him in his plot to seize power.

Upon reaching Paris, d'Artagnan is dismayed to learn from de Treville that he must serve two years as a cadet or perform "extraordinary deeds of valor" before he can become a Musketeer. Then he spots Rochefort on the street. In his haste to confront his enemy, d'Artagnan unintentionally insults three Musketeers: Athos, Porthos, and Aramis in turn, agreeing each time to a duel. When his opponents arrive at the appointed place, they are amused to discover they are all engaged to cross swords with the same man. However, Cardinal Richelieu's Guards try to arrest the Musketeers for dueling. D'Artagnan joins the outnumbered trio and acquits himself well.

His three new friends secure him free lodging by threatening landlord Bernajou with an imaginary law and find him a servant named Planchet. That night, d'Artagnan is pleasantly surprised when Bernajou's ward Constance enters the room. It turns out that it is actually her chamber, though she is rarely there, as she spends most of her time at the palace as lady-in-waiting to the Queen. Constance has arranged a rendezvous between Queen Anne and her lover, the English Duke of Buckingham.

Buckingham threatens to wage war to obtain Anne, but she dissuades him by appealing to his love; she gives him her diamonds as a pledge for peace. Bernajou, lusting for Constance and suspicious of her meeting a lover, has hidden in an armoire and witnesses their meeting. He is arrested and reveals the details to Rochefort, who is in league with Richelieu to bring about the Queen's downfall and thus thwart Buckingham. Rochefort lies to Richelieu that the Queen gave her diamonds to start a war between France and England, and they arrange it so that she must appear wearing the diamonds at the King's anniversary ball eight days hence.

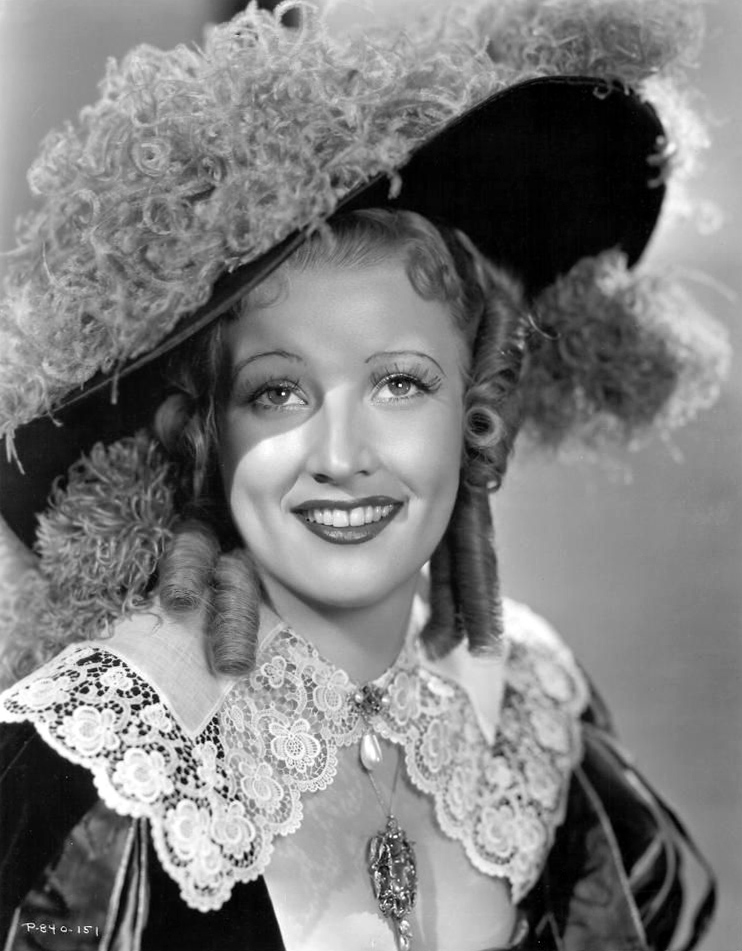
Margot Grahame as Milady de Winter

When d'Artagnan finds out from Constance the Queen's danger, he decides to ride to England and retrieve the jewelry. De Treville assigns him help: Athos, Porthos, and Aramis. Alerted by Bernajou, Rochefort sends his men to attack them along the way. One by one, the others remain behind to hold off their enemies, and only d'Artagnan reaches Calais, where he discovers that Lady de Winter has killed Buckingham's valet and stolen the diamonds. She is not fooled by his attempt to gain her confidence and has her men tie him up and throw him in her carriage. She stops at an inn on her journey back to Paris; by chance it is where the Musketeers had agreed to rendezvous. They free d'Artagnan and take Lady de Winter prisoner, after which Athos reveals that she is his wife. At Athos's ancestral home, where Constance is waiting, Lady de Winter throws herself into the river.

At the ball, d'Artagnan unmasks Rochefort as a traitor, producing a secret treaty taken from Lady de Winter and offered by Rochefort to Buckingham in which the King and Richelieu would be assassinated. Hearing that d'Artagnan is just a cadet, the King immediately makes him a Musketeer.

== Cast ==
- Walter Abel as d'Artagnan
- Ian Keith as Count de Rochefort
- Margot Grahame as Milady de Winter
- Paul Lukas as Athos
- Moroni Olsen as Porthos
- Onslow Stevens as Aramis
- Heather Angel as Constance
- Ralph Faulkner as Jussac
- Rosamond Pinchot as Queen Anne
- John Qualen as Planchet
- Murray Kinnell as Bernajou
- Nigel De Brulier as Cardinal Richelieu
- Lumsden Hare as Captain de Treville
- Miles Mander as King Louis XIII
- Ralph Forbes as Duke of Buckingham
- Lionel Belmore as Inn Proprietor (uncredited)

Cast notes:

- Lucille Ball is listed as an uncredited extra.
- Keith would later reprise his role as Rochefort in the 1948 version.

== Critical reception ==
In his review in The New York Times, Andre Sennwald wrote "The Three Musketeers in its 1935 edition is a reasonably entertaining picture, but it is not in the same league with the athletic Fairbanks' version of fourteen years ago." Hal Erickson opined, "This is considered the dreariest of the many versions of The Three Musketeers."

== Reception ==
The film made a profit of $55,000.
