= Counterfeit (1936 film) =

1936 film by Erle C. Kenton

- Directed by: Erle C. Kenton
- Written by: Bruce Manning; William Rankin
- Produced by: B.P. Schulberg
- Starring: Chester Morris; Marian Marsh; Margot Grahame; Lloyd Nolan
- Cinematography: John Stumar
- Edited by: Richard Cahoon
- Music by: Howard Jackson
- Production company: Columbia Pictures
- Distributed by: Columbia Pictures
- Release date: May 25, 1936
- Running time: 73 minutes
- Country: United States
- Language: English

Counterfeit is a 1936 American crime film directed by Erle C. Kenton and starring Chester Morris, Marian Marsh, Margot Grahame and Lloyd Nolan.

== Plot ==
A treasury department agent goes undercover to infiltrate a gang who have kidnapped an employee of the department and are forcing him to produce counterfeit notes.

== Cast ==
- Chester Morris as John Joseph Madden
- Marian Marsh as Verna Maxwell
- Margot Grahame as Aimee Maxwell
- Lloyd Nolan as Capper Stevens
- Claude Gillingwater as Tom Perkins
- George McKay as Angel White
- John Gallaudet as Pete Dailey
- Gene Morgan as Gus
- Pierre Watkin as Matt McDonald
- Marc Lawrence as Dint Coleman

== Bibliography ==
- Michael Schlossheimer. Gunmen and Gangsters: Profiles of Nine Actors Who Portrayed Memorable Screen Tough Guys. McFarland, 2001.
