= The Fabulous Joe =

1947 film by Harve Foster

- Directed by: Harve Foster
- Screenplay by: Arnold Belgard; Jack Jevne
- Story by: Hal Roach, Jr.
- Produced by: Bebe Daniels
- Starring: Walter Abel; Margot Grahame; Marie Wilson; Donald Meek; Sheldon Leonard; Howard Petrie
- Cinematography: John W. Boyle
- Edited by: Bert Jordan
- Music by: Heinz Roemheld
- Production company: Hal Roach Studios
- Distributed by: United Artists
- Release date: August 29, 1947
- Running time: 59 minutes
- Country: United States
- Language: English

The Fabulous Joe is a 1947 American comedy film in the Hal Roach's Streamliners series. It was directed by Harve Foster and written by Arnold Belgard and Jack Jevne. The film stars Walter Abel, Margot Grahame, Marie Wilson, Donald Meek, Sheldon Leonard and Howard Petrie. It was released on August 29, 1947 by United Artists.

== Plot ==
Milo Terkel has been asked for a divorce by his wife Emily and he explains to a judge why, including that it's partially the fault of his dog Joe.

The trouble began one night when Milo bought Emily an expensive piece of jewelry, only to discover she won't be home for dinner. He goes out to eat, taking Joe with him, and the suitably named Gorgeous Gilmore spots the jewelry and admires it.

Jealousy ensues after Emily's freeloading brother George Baxter begins to meddle, making it appear Milo's seeing another woman. Joe the dog doesn't help matters, causing Gorgeous to fall into a pond, causing Milo to take her home and replace her dress. Then the new dress gets ripped from Gorgeous by angry boyfriend Louie.

By the time Milo is done telling how many different ways Joe has intervened and that the dog is even talking to him, the judge is ready to sentence him to a sanitarium. Emily takes pity and takes him away for a fresh start to their marriage instead.

== Cast ==
- Walter Abel as Milo Terkel
- Margot Grahame as Emily Terkel
- Marie Wilson as Gorgeous Gilmore
- Donald Meek as Henry Cadwallader
- Sheldon Leonard as Louie
- Howard Petrie as George Baxter
- Nana Bryant as Mrs. Belmont
- Clarence Kolb as Cornelius Belmont, II
- John Miles as Cornelius Belmont III (as Johnny Miles)
- Barbara Bates as Debbie Terkel
- Donald MacBride as Lawyer Gilbert
- Lucien Littlefield as Judge
- Dorothy Christy as Grace
- John Eldredge as Charlie
- Al Bridge as Florida Club Bartender
