= 3 Musketiers =

- De Musical
- Dutch 3 Musketiers logo
- Music: Rob Bolland; Ferdi Bolland; Paul Bogaev
- Lyrics: Rob Bolland; Ferdi Bolland; Paul Bogaev
- Book: André Breedland
- Productions: Rotterdam 2003; Berlin 2005; Stuttgart 2007; Hungary 2007; Norway 2012

3 Musketiers is a Dutch musical, also known as 3 Musketiere (German), 3 Musketeers (English) and A 3 Testőr (Hungarian) written by Ferdi Bolland and Rob Bolland. The story is based on Alexandre Dumas, père's 1844 novel The Three Musketeers.

== Productions ==
=== The Netherlands ===
The musical premiered on 30 March 2003 in the Nieuwe Luxor Theater in Rotterdam starring Bastiaan Ragas as d'Artagnan and Pia Douwes as Milady de Winter. The final presentation was on 4 January 2004.

The Brabants Muziek Theater staged the musical in 2018 with Luc Vorselaars as d¨Artagnan and Veronique van Iersel as Mylady. It premiered on 6 October in Theater De Lievekamp in Oss. The final presentation was on 30 November 2018 in Theater Chassé in Breda.

The original Dutch production featured minimalist sets and abstract costumes by Yan Tax, which were not true to the period of the piece, but gave a feeling of the character and an impression of the era. For example, Milady De Winter's costumes were based mainly in leather and lace, whereas Anna wore spectacularly jeweled gowns, including a dress made entirely from real peacock feathers.

=== Germany ===
- The first German production (Berlin in 2005) also starred Pia Douwes.
- A 2018 German production for the Winzendorf musical summer featured the musical debut of Zoë Straub.
- A 2024 production for the Freilichtspiele Tecklenburg is announced with 20 presentations

The German productions used the same costumes with some new additions—the most notable change being that Milady's costume for Where did that summer go? was changed from a black leather coat and dishevelled hair to a long black velvet gown and her hair down and curly. The sets for the German productions were realistic and true to the period of the piece and gave an interesting contrast with the modern costume styles. Following in the tradition of Elisabeth, new songs were added for each new production.

=== Hungary ===
A Hungarian production was mounted in 2006.

=== Norway ===
The first Norwegian production opened in Kolbotn on 12 March 2012, produced by Scenario at Kolben kulturhus. The show was performed in Norwegian, and the cast included Joakim H. Ousdal as d'Artagnan.

== Synopsis ==
Beginning in Gascony in 1626, d'Artagnan practices duelling on his parents' farm before his sick father arrives and reminds him that duelling has been forbidden by the King. D'Artagnan's father reminisces about his days as one of the King's musketeers - a position to which d'Artagnan aspires. D'Artagnan reflects on his aged Father's condition (Father) before deciding to leave for Paris to try to become a Musketeer (Today Is The Day).

At an inn outside Paris, the Catholic and Protestant villagers reflect on their shared hate of one another (Catholic and Huguenot) while the captain of the Cardinal Guard, Rochefort, waits with his men for the arrival of Milady de Winter, who has returned from England where she has been spying on the English Court. Milady arrives, excited to be back in France and dreams of being reunited with her one true love (Milady Is Back).

Rochefort instructs Milady that she must remain in the inn and not continue to Paris since she was exiled from France some 25 years previously and cannot travel without documentation from the Cardinal. D'Artagnan arrives at the inn and gets into a duel with Rochefort and wins, before carrying on his journey to Paris. Three of the King's Musketeers (Athos, Porthos and Aramis) reflect on their shared love and hate for Paris, just as d'Artagnan arrives in the city. The Queen's handmaiden, Constance, watches the sun rise over the city as the whores and traders of the city go about their routine (Paris).

Constance and d'Artagnan meet on the streets of the city, before d'Artagnan manages to get into arguments with Athos, Porthos and Aramis, who challenge him to a duel the following morning. At the cathedral, Cardinal Richelieu prays, displaying his absolute faith (O Lord). Queen Anne of Austria arrives and is advised by Richelieu to use her influence on Louis XIII to instigate a holy war against the Protestant church. The King arrives and the merits of war are discussed, with suggestion that the King uses Anna as a political pawn to gain favour from her family in the Spanish court (War or no war).

The following morning, d'Artagnan arrives for his duel, as do the three musketeers, only to be interrupted by Rochefort and his men. The musketeers and d'Artagnan win a fight against Rochefort and the Cardinal Guard and they agree to take d'Artagnan to meet with the King (One for all and all for one).

At the cathedral, Milady arrives to speak with Richelieu, telling him that she has seen the British Prime Minister Lord Buckingham in Paris and that, in exchange for Richelieu reversing her exile, she will spy on him. Richelieu reveals a brand on Milady's shoulder and reminds her that she is in his power and always will be. He reveals that she was branded for having an affair with a priest and that she will always be in debt to the Church. As Richelieu leaves, Milady reflects on her situation and that she was actually raped by a priest and that the Church blamed her. Anna reflects on her arranged marriage to the king and Constance dreams of d'Artagnan (Who can live without love?).

Athos reveals to d'Artagnan that he was once in love with a beautiful young woman whom he married. She was so pure that she insisted they always make love in the dark, until one evening in the moonlight, he found a brand on her shoulder, revealing her to be a whore and thief and had her exiled from the country and never saw her again. Lord Buckingham meets with Anna and it is revealed that they are former lovers. She gives him a necklace from the Crown Jewels and makes him promise that he won't declare war on England. Milady sees the exchange and proceeds to try to steal the necklace. D'Artagnan protects Lord Buckingham and is seen by Constance, who finally reveals her name to him (Constance) and they sleep together (Tonight).

Milady sneaks into Buckingham's chambers and steels the box containing the necklace before she is recognised by Buckingham who recognises her as the widow of his friend, Lord de Winter. Milady escapes and takes the box to the Cardinal, who finds that it is empty. Milady expresses her hatred of men (Men) and heads to the Royal Hunt, in disguise, where Richelieu suggests that the King hosts a ball and that he and the Queen wear the full crown jewels (Hunt).

The first act ends with great uncertainty but with d'Artagnan swearing to go to England and fetch the necklace from Buckingham for the Queen (Fight).

D'Artagnan crosses to England and meets Lord Buckingham, obtaining the necklace. Milady goes to the docks and waits for d'Artagnan to return to France, at which point she attempts to seduce him and take the necklace, but she fails. She explains this to the Cardinal, who tells her that she has one last chance to get hold of the necklace or he will never remove her stigma. As Milady leaves to attempt to find d'Artagnan, Richelieu is overwhelmed by desires of the flesh and their conflict with his faith (Not Made Of Stone).

At the Palace, Anna and the King discuss their marriage. She pleads with him to show her the same love she has shown him (Unshared Sorrow). Constance and d'Artagnan separately sing of their love for one another as he returns to Paris (All I Ever Want).

Constance is attacked by Milady and her men and captured so that they can blackmail d'Artagnan into giving the necklace to them. At La Rochelle, Richelieu prepares for war (Believe Me) as the Musketeers try to find d'Artagnan, which they eventually do, disguised as three monks. The Musketeers reveal to d'Artagnan that Constance has been kidnapped and that they must go to the convent in which she is imprisoned. In the dungeons of the convent, Constance dreams of d'Artagnan rescuing her (God Smiled On Us) before Milady arrives, disguised as a nun and poisons Constance.

As Constance lies dying, Milady reveals how years of heartache have turned her heart to stone and have destroyed her faith. D'Artagnan and the Musketeers arrive and Milady attempts to escape. Athos reveals that she is his ex-wife and flees to the convent tower. Milady follows Athos and tells him that she has waited 25 years to see him and still loves him more than ever and that everything she has done has been to try to get Richelieu to exonerate her so that she can be with Athos once more (Where did that summer go?).

Athos, overcome with emotion, allows Porthos and Aramis to decide the punishment for Milady - which they agree should be death. As Athos draws his sword, Milady throws herself to her death from the tower. At the Palace, the Ball has begun and d'Artagnan arrives just in time to give the Queen her jewels, reveal the murder of Constance and the plottings of Richelieu. As Richelieu and his men are arrested, the King and Queen are united and plan to have children at last. D'Artagnan goes to the grave of his father and reflects on his new life as a Musketeer.

== Awards ==
- 2003 John Kraaijkamp Musical Awards nominations and winners:
  - Leading Actress: Pia Douwes
  - Leading Actor: Bastiaan Ragas
  - Featured Actress: Ellen Evers (Winner)
  - Featured Actor: Cees Geel
  - Promising Talent: Tooske Breugem
  - Design: Jeroen ten Brinke (Winner)
  - Design: Yan Taks
- 2004 John Kraaijkamp Musical Awards nominations:
  - ANWB Publieksprijs: 3 Musketiers
- Amateur Musical Awards nominations and winners
  - 2018 Leading Actress: Marieke Visser (winner)
  - 2017 Featured Actress: Marlies Kapteijn and Hilde de Kok
- 2021 Top Ten Favorite Original Dutch Musical of all times

== List of Musical Numbers ==
1. Prologue (Streetsinger - Not found in the original Dutch production)
2. Nu/Heut ist der Tag ("Now"/"Today Is The Day" - d'Artagnan)
3. Milady ist zurück ("Milady is back" - Milady - written for the German production)
4. Katholiek en Hugenoot ("Catholic and Huguenots" - Chorus - Dutch production only)
5. Parijs/Paris ("Paris" - Chorus)
6. O Heer/O Herr ("Oh Lord" - Cardinal)
7. Vader/Vater ("Father" - d'Artagnan)
8. Mannen/Männer ("Men" - Milady and chorus)
9. Een voor allen/Einer für alle ("All for One" - Athos, Porthos, Aramis, d'Artagnan)
10. Liefde laat je nooit alleen ("Love will never leave your side" - Athos - Dutch and Hungarian productions only)
11. Engel aus Kristall ("Crystal Angel" - Athos - German production only)
12. Constance (d'Artagnan)
13. Ik Ben Een Vrouw/Wer kann schon ohne Liebe sein ("I Am A Woman"/"Who Can Live Without Love?" - Milady, Anna and Constance)
14. Jacht/Jagd ("Hunt" - Aristocracy)
15. Deze Nacht ("Tonight" - Constance and d'Artagnan - Dutch and Hungarian productions only)
16. Alles/Alles ("All I Ever Want" - d'Artagnan and Constance)
17. Vecht ("Fight" - Full company - Dutch and Hungarian productions only)
18. Einer für alle (Reprise) ("All for one" - German productions only)
19. Prologue Act 2 (Streetsinger)
20. Niet van Steen/Nicht Aus Stein ("Not Made Of Stone" - Cardinal)
21. Twijfel/Kein Geteiltes Leid ("Doubt"/"Unshared Sorrow" - Anna)
22. Knipoog van God/Gott lächelt uns zu ("A Wink From God"/"God Smiles On Us" - Constance)
23. Geloof mij/Glaubt mir ("Believe Me" - Cardinal)
24. Waar bleef die zomer?/Wo Ist Der Sommer? ("Where Did That Summer Go?" - Milady (Duet with Athos in later German productions)
25. Vive Le Roi ("Long Live The King" - Company)
