= Two O'Clock Courage =

1945 film by Anthony Mann

- Theatrical release poster
- Directed by: Anthony Mann
- Screenplay by: Robert E. Kent; Gordon Kahn (additional dialogue)
- Based on: Two O'Clock Courage; 1934 novel by Gelett Burgess
- Produced by: Benjamin Stoloff
- Starring: Tom Conway; Ann Rutherford; Jane Greer
- Cinematography: Jack MacKenzie
- Edited by: Philip Martin
- Music by: Roy Webb
- Production company: RKO Pictures
- Distributed by: RKO Pictures
- Release date: April 13, 1945 (United States)
- Running time: 68 minutes
- Country: United States
- Language: English

Two O'Clock Courage is a 1945 American film noir directed by Anthony Mann and written by Robert E. Kent, based on a novel by Gelett Burgess. The drama features Tom Conway and Ann Rutherford. It is a remake of Two in the Dark (1936).

== Plot ==
An amnesiac man stops at a street corner where he stumbles onto the road and is nearly run over by a taxi driven by Patty Mitchell. Noticing the man is bleeding from the head, she offers him a cab drive to a nearby hospital. Along the way, Patty parks the cab, where the clues to his identity are a hatband emblazoned with the initials "RD" or "DR", tickets to the Imperial Theater, and a matchbook from the Blue Room at the Regency Hotel.

Patty drives the amnesiac to the police station, where they read a newspaper reporting theatre producer Robert Dilling's murder. She suspects the initials are Dilling's, but doesn't believe the amnesiac is a murderer though he fits the physical description. She drives him to a tailor, where he buys a new suit to hide his identity. There, they hear a radio report stating Dilling's chauffeur Dave Rennick is wanted for the murder.

Suspecting he could be Dave Rennick, they search his apartment. Meanwhile, police inspector Bill Brenner and reporter Al Haley arrive to investigate. Claiming they are a newlywed couple, Mr. and Mrs. Clarence Smith, Patty explains they learned about Dilling's murder and are using their honeymoon to investigate. Believing that "Clarence" could be Rennick, Brenner takes them to Dilling's house, where Judson, a butler, denies that "Clarence" is the chauffeur. Judson also recounts he overheard an argument between Dilling and the murderer, who gave Dilling a violent warning.

Brenner and Haley uncover a manuscript titled Two O'Clock Courage by Lawrence Tenny, and that Dilling had a meeting with a "T. A." prior to his murder. Police headquarters calls the house, in which the tailor confirms one of his customers was dressed in a pin-striped suit. Brenner arrests Judson, who is dressed in a similar suit. Patty and the amnesiac leave, and he decides to go to the Regency Hotel to further uncover his identity.

Patty and the amnesiac arrive at the Regency Hotel, where they are told by Haney that Judson is no longer a suspect. Inside the Blue Room, the amnesiac is greeted as "Step" by Helen Carter and Mark Evans, a playwright. Shortly after, Evans gets into a fight with actor Steve Maitland. The man meets with Evans who confirms that Tenny died by overdosing on pills. Suddenly, the man remembers his name is Ted Allison.

After Ted leaves Mark's room, he and Patty call the Regency Hotel to confirm a hotel room was registered in his name. Meanwhile, Brenner has arrested Rennick, who states he had heard Maitland threaten Dilling. As Haney searches Maitland's room, Maitland's girlfriend Barbara Borden finds him. Brenner arrives shortly after, and Maitland confesses he made the threat. In his room, Ted reads a letter from Tenny's mother, and Haney arrives and fights with him.

As the prime suspect, Ted returns to Dilling's house and learns the warning was a line from the play. Suddenly, a bullet grazes his head, rendering Ted semi-conscious. He remembers telling Dilling that Evans has plagiarized Tenny's play, and afterwards, Ted finds Dilling dead and is then struck in the head by the murderer. Ted is immediately arrested, who explains to Brenner that Evans had stolen Tenny's play and therefore Dilling blackmailed Evans.

Ted confronts Evans, suspecting he tried to find Tenny's last manuscript to cover his misdeed. Suddenly, Evans is shot dead and his death suspected to be suicide. Brenner however notices the gun has not been fired. A gunfight ensues, and the police find Barbara Borden, mortally injured, who admits she murdered Dilling because she was being blackmailed over old love letters. She then killed Evans because he knew. Cleared from murder, Ted marries Patty.

== Cast ==
- Tom Conway as The Man/Ted "Step" Allison
- Ann Rutherford as Patty Mitchell
- Richard Lane as Al Haley
- Lester Matthews as Mark Evans
- Roland Drew as Steve Maitland
- Emory Parnell as Insp. Bill Brenner
- Jane Greer as Helen Carter (billed as Bettejane Greer)
- Jean Brooks as Barbara Borden

== Production ==
Two O'Clock Courage was adapted from a 1934 novel that was previously filmed by RKO as Two in the Dark (1936). It was directed by Benjamin Stoloff, who produced Two O'Clock Courage. The film starred Tom Conway, who was appeared in The Falcon series at RKO. Ann Rutherford had just left MGM. Filming started August 1944.

== Reception ==
Bosley Crowther of The New York Times called the film "a modest little item of second-rate cinematic fun".

Variety called it a "slow paced, drab mystery... situations are obvious, the dialog routine" although it felt the leads "give film some story strength."

Harrison's Reports called the film a "fairly good program murder mystery melodrama. The story is neither novel nor logical, but it holds one's attention well and keeps one guessing as to the murderer's identity."
