= Milady de Winter =

- D'Artagnan Romances character
- First appearance: The Three Musketeers
- Created by: Alexandre Dumas, père

In-universe information
- Gender: Female
- Occupation: Spy
- Spouses: Athos; Sheffield, Baron De Winter
- Children: Mordaunt
- Nationality: French

Milady de Winter, often referred to as simply Milady, is a fictional character in the novel The Three Musketeers (1844) by Alexandre Dumas, père, set in 1625 France. She is a spy for Cardinal Richelieu and is one of the dominant antagonists of the story. Her role in the first part of the book is to seduce the English prime minister, the Duke of Buckingham, who is also the secret lover of Queen Anne of France. Hoping to blackmail the queen, Richelieu orders Milady to steal two diamonds from a set of matched studs given to Buckingham by the queen, which were a gift to her from her husband, King Louis XIII. Thwarted by d'Artagnan and the other musketeers, Milady's conflict with d'Artagnan carries much of the second half of the novel.

== Character overview ==
She is described as being twenty-eight years old, tall, fair-haired, and uncommonly beautiful with brilliant blue eyes and black lashes and brows. Milady possesses a voice that can seduce and bewitch.

A capable and intelligent French spy who can pass effortlessly as a native Englishwoman

Milady later is revealed to be the wife of Athos, originally the Comte de la Fère, one of the three musketeers of the novel's title.

== Background ==
Like Athos, who sheds his true identity as the Comte de la Fère when he joins the musketeers, Milady goes by numerous aliases so that her identity is concealed for a good part of the novel. Athos first knows her as a sixteen year-old adolescent Anne de Breuil, but because she already was concealing her past at that time, it was probably not her real name.

According to one of her enemies, the executioner of Lille, as a young Benedictine nun, she seduced the convent's trusting priest, urging him to steal the church's sacred vessels to finance a new life in another part of the country. They fled together and were soon apprehended. Milady then seduced the jailer's son and escaped, leaving behind her first lover to be branded for theft. The priest is the only one sentenced for stealing the vessels, however, the executioner who had to brand him happened to be his brother and, blaming Milady for leading his brother astray, tracked her down on his own and branded her on the shoulder with the same fleur-de-lis symbol, marking her as a convicted criminal, even if she was never convicted.

The priest in turn escaped and the lovers fled to a small town where they posed as a country curate and his sister. The village where they lived was part of Athos's lands and he became captivated by both her beauty and her intellect. As seigneur of the county he says he could have seduced her or taken her by force, but despite the opposition of his family and her obscure origins he married her, giving her his wealth and title and raising her to the nobility.

After a year of marriage, while the pair were hunting in the forest one day, Milady fell from her horse and fainted. Cutting away her clothes so she could breathe, Athos discovered the convict brand on her shoulder. Feeling dishonored, Athos immediately hanged her from a tree. Later he confesses to D'Artagnan that she was a good comtesse ("she held her rank perfectly"), that he never saw her angry and that this was "just murder". His wife's so-called brother, who had married the pair, fled the day before any retribution could be taken (this is at odds with the executioner's assertion that he went back to Lille right after she left him for Athos, and it is one of the inconsistencies in Milady's story in the book).

Athos believes he only pretended to be a curate for the purpose of getting his mistress married in a secure position. For most of the novel, Athos assumes his deceitful wife is dead by his own hand, not knowing she survived the hanging and that she and Milady are the same person. Because the Comte de la Fère effectively ceases to exist when he becomes Athos, Milady makes the same mistake in presuming her first husband is dead.

== Active role in the novel ==
When d'Artagnan first spies Milady in Paris, she has married into English nobility some time previously by wedding a Count (which, in real life, would be termed an earl), the older brother of Lord de Winter. After she was made her husband's heir, he died violently and mysteriously within a matter of hours, leaving her a widow with a young child, who is Lord de Winter's only heir. Discovering that Milady is infatuated with Comte des Wardes, an equally infatuated d'Artagnan forges the count's reply to a love letter from Milady and arranges a nighttime rendezvous where he impersonates des Wardes. During the assignation, Milady gives him, as des Wardes, a sapphire and diamond ring and swears to have revenge on d'Artagnan because he wounded the real des Wardes in a duel. She also reveals that she detests d'Artagnan for having spared her brother-in-law's life in another duel, which lost her the income from her son's potential inheritance.

When d'Artagnan later reveals to Milady that he had tricked her and the tryst had been with him, not des Wardes, she attempts to kill him. In the struggle her nightgown is torn, revealing the fleur-de-lis brand. Knowing that her terrible secret has been revealed to her enemy, Milady becomes resolved that d'Artagnan must die.

Her attempts to secure his assassination lead to her eventual downfall. D'Artagnan escapes and immediately reports to Athos that Milady has a brand on her shoulder identical to one he discovered on his wife's body. When Athos hears this and identifies the ring Milady gave to d'Artagnan as his mother's, the former Comte de la Fère realizes that his wife is not dead after all.

Milady tries many methods to murder d'Artagnan; while eavesdropping on a meeting between Richelieu and Milady, the musketeers hear that, in exchange for her assassination of Buckingham, Richelieu will undertake the task. Milady bargains with the cardinal and obtains a pardon that absolves her of future (unnamed) actions. It is not until Athos confronts her and forces her at pistol point to relinquish the pardon that a horrified Milady realizes that the musketeer Athos is her first husband, the Comte de la Fère. Athos refrains from killing her, instead leaving her with no choice but to be escorted to England on her murderous mission but without the cardinal's pardon.

The musketeers then warn Lord de Winter that not only has his sister-in-law made previous attempts on his life (which is not true) but that her first husband is still alive, invalidating her marriage to his late brother (without mentioning that she believed the husband to be dead). They also attempt to foil Milady's plot against Buckingham by having de Winter warn him. Upon arriving in England, Milady is arrested and imprisoned in a house by de Winter. He chooses for her jailer a man he thinks will be impervious to her charms, the straitlaced Puritan John Felton. However Milady persuades Felton that she is actually a Puritan as well and that Buckingham is persecuting her because she refused his advances. Felton has his own grievances against Buckingham, whom he blames for his lack of promotion in the army, and succumbs to her manipulation. He then proceeds to murder the duke (an actual historical event) but then is aghast to see Milady's ship sailing away without him.

Returning to France, Milady murders d'Artagnan's lover Constance, then flees. The musketeers and Lord de Winter hunt Milady and track her to Lille, where they try her among themselves for her alleged crimes, including the poisoning of de Winter's brother, the murder of the Duke of Buckingham (killed by Felton) and the murder of Felton (regardless that they don't know at the moment if he's alive or dead). Athos finally charges her with deceiving him, hiding the fact that she was a convicted criminal when he married her. Milady defies anyone to produce any proof that she was ever sentenced for a crime. To her horror, the executioner of Lille steps forward to reveal himself as the man who branded her. He confesses to have done it on his own, confirming she was never sentenced by a judge, but the musketeers take his word that she deserved the punishment.

When his priest brother escaped from jail to follow Milady, the executioner was condemned to serve his brother's sentence for him. On learning this later, the disgraced priest returned and surrendered himself, only to hang himself in his cell that same night. The executioner reveals that, rather than having schemed to marry her to a count, his brother was abandoned when Milady left him to marry Athos. (This is at odds with Athos' earlier assertion that her so-called brother married the pair, and it is one of the inconsistencies of Milady's story in the book).

The musketeers and D'Artagnan condemn Milady to death and, despite her requests to be brought to a court, and reminders that they are committing murder, she is beheaded by the executioner.

Later, when D'Artagnan explains the end of Milady to Richelieu, the cardinal states that the musketeers actions constitute murder. D'Artagnan doesn't deny the accusation but instead produces the letter of pardon written by Richelieu himself for Milady.

== Aliases ==
As the true identity of the Comte de la Fère is concealed by the name Athos, Milady's true identity is hidden by various names throughout the novel:

- Anne de Breuil (the name by which Athos knew Milady when he met her)
- Comtesse de la Fère (the title Milady assumed when she married the Comte de la Fère, later known as Athos)
- Milady de Winter (the general name Milady is referred to throughout the story) (a variation on the previous name; in some English translations, this is translated as Clarisse or Clarice)
- Charlotte Backson (the fictional name Milady's brother-in-law, Lord de Winter, attempts to bestow upon her in his plan to banish her to the colonies) (in Dumas's play The Youth of the Musketeers the young Milady is also named Charlotte Backson.)

== Her son in the sequel ==
In the 1845 sequel Twenty Years After, Milady's son Mordaunt, now twenty-three, takes her role as one of the chief antagonists. As twisted and as deceitful as his mother, he sets about avenging her death, posing as a monk and murdering the executioner of Lille while taking his confession. He also murders Lord de Winter, Milady's brother-in-law, who disowned him as the De Winter heir after the death of his mother.

Mordaunt later becomes involved in the English Civil War and commits regicide, executing King Charles I in spite of the efforts of d'Artagnan and the three former musketeers to prevent it. D'Artagnan and his friends later confront Mordaunt at Cromwell's London residence, but in the course of a duel, he escapes through a secret passage with Athos expressing relief at Mordaunt's survival.

The musketeers and their manservants leave England by ship, but Mordaunt sneaks aboard and blows it up. As the survivors escape in a rowboat, Mordaunt pleads for them to help him aboard, accusing them of killing him as they killed his mother. With the exception of Athos, they contemptuously reject his appeals. Athos insists on saving him, but as he helps him into the boat, Mordaunt deliberately drags him back into the water where they struggle and Mordaunt is killed. The novel drops hints that Mordaunt may have actually been Athos's estranged son with Milady.

== Origin of the character ==
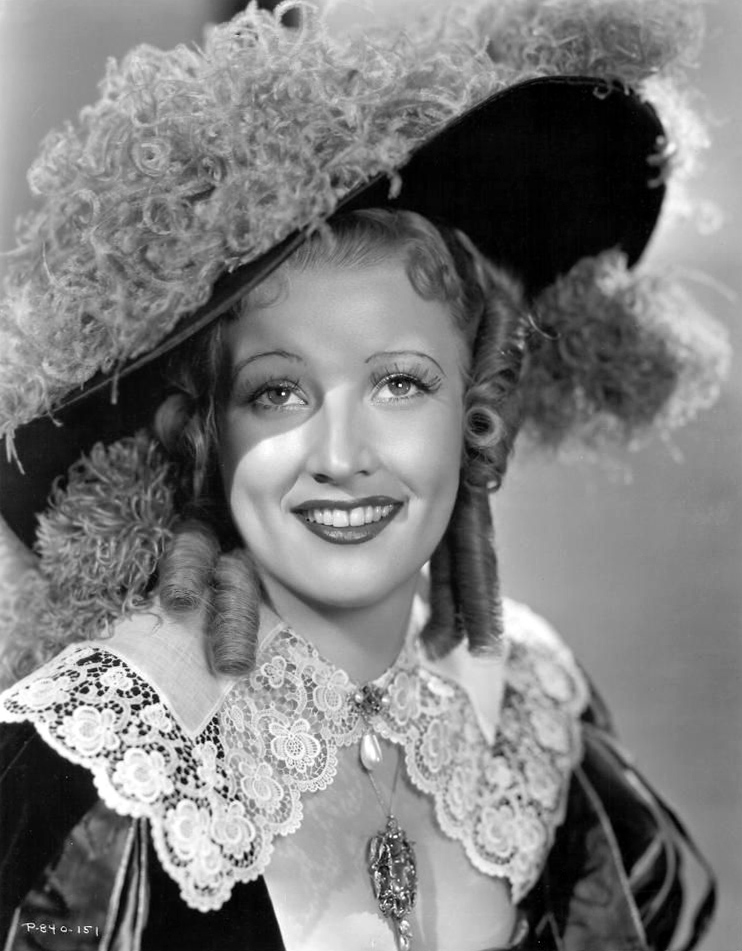
Margot Grahame as Milady de Winter in the 1935 film version

The character of Milady previously appeared in the Mémoires de M. d'Artagnan (1700), a historical novel by Gatien de Courtilz de Sandras, which Dumas discovered during his research for his history of Louis XIV. In Courtilz's novel (one of the literary sources for the more famous novel by Dumas), Milady is one of the exiled English Queen Henrietta Maria's ladies-in-waiting. Dumas changed Milady's background significantly; from another Courtilz novel (Mémoires de M. le Comte de Rochforte, 1687) Dumas partly derived the idea of the branded woman, which he applied to his version of Milady.

There appears to be a possible historical precedent for the character of Milady: The memoirs of François de La Rochefoucauld and Hubert de Brienne, Comte de Conflans as well as Volume I of Chroniques de l'Œil de Bœuf by Touchard-Lafosse describe Milady's antagonistic role in the diamond studs plot which Dumas reworked in The Three Musketeers. In La Rochefoucauld's volume, Milady is the Countess of Carlisle, in de Brienne's version she is Lady Clarick de Winter, and in Touchard-Lafosse's history she is Lady de Clarick. Milady – or rather, her historical/literary precursors – play relatively minor roles in Courtilz's novel and the other memoirs and pseudo-memoirs. While her theft of the diamond studs and other activities in the first half of The Three Musketeers are accounted for in the earlier works that Dumas borrowed, her machinations in the second half of the book are largely Dumas' invention.

Others think that the character of Milady de Winter may be based on Lucy Hay, Countess of Carlisle (née Percy; 1599 – 5 November 1660). François de La Rochefoucauld mentioned in his Memoirs an anecdote he was told by Marie de Rohan, in which Lucy Hay stole some diamond studs (a present of the king of France to Anne of Austria) the queen had given to George Villiers, 1st Duke of Buckingham, from the duke as revenge because he had loved her before he loved the queen of France. The king of France then wanted to see the studs and somehow the queen was able to recover them. Alexandre Dumas later used this entire story, and therefore he probably based Milady de Winter on Lucy Carlisle in The Three Musketeers.

== In popular culture ==
=== Films ===
Actresses who have played Milady on screen include:

- Nelly Cormon in Les Trois Mousquetaires (1912)
- Louise Glaum in The Three Musketeers (1916)
- Barbara La Marr in The Three Musketeers (1921)
- Claude Mérelle in Les Trois Mousquetaires (1921)
- Dorothy Revier in The Iron Mask (1929)
- Edith Méra in The Three Musketeers (1932)
- Margot Grahame in The Three Musketeers (1935)
- Binnie Barnes in The Three Musketeers (1939)
- Lana Turner in The Three Musketeers (1948)
- Yvonne Sanson in The Three Musketeers (1953)
- Mylène Demongeot in Les trois mousquetaires: Premiere époque-Les ferrets de la reine and Les trois mousquetaires: La vengeance de Milady (aka “The Fighting Musketeers” and “The Vengeance of the Musketeers”) (both 1961)
- Lisa Gastoni in The Four Musketeers (1963)
- Faye Dunaway in The Three Musketeers (1973) and The Four Musketeers (1974)
- Karin Petersen in The Four Charlots Musketeers and The Four Charlots Musketeers 2 (both 1974)
- Rebecca De Mornay in The Three Musketeers (1993)
- Emmanuelle Béart in D'Artagnan et les trois mousquetaires (2005)
- Milla Jovovich in The Three Musketeers (2011)
- Ekaterina Vilkova in The Three Musketeers (2013)
- Eva Green in The Three Musketeers: D'Artagnan and The Three Musketeers: Milady (2023)

In the cartoon version Dogtanian and the Three Muskehounds and its sequel The Return of Dogtanian, Milady (voice of Eiko Masuyama in the Japanese dub and by Edie Mirman in the English dub of The Return of Dogtanian) is a female cat while most of the characters are dogs. With the exception of her real name (Countess de Winter), her origins are never revealed. It was hinted that "only one man" knows of her past.

In the movie The Return of the Musketeers, Kim Cattrall plays Milady's daughter Justine de Winter as a female version of Mordaunt.

=== Television ===
- Mary Peach in The Three Musketeers (1966 miniseries)
- Margarita Terekhova in D'Artagnan and Three Musketeers (1978 miniseries)
- Maimie McCoy in The Musketeers (2014)

=== Musical ===
- Pia Douwes in 3 Musketiers (2003 musical)

=== Theatre ===
Milady de Winter has been portrayed in theatre plays by different actresses such as:

- Magali Noël in Les Trois Mousquetaires, directed by Michel Berto, Théâtre du Midi, 1971
- Natacha Amal in Milady by Éric-Emmanuel Schmitt from Les Trois Mousquetaires by Alexandre Dumas, directed by Pascal Racan, Villers Abbey, 2010
- Eunice Woods originated the role of Milady in The Three Musketeers by Kirsten Childs, The Acting Company 2022-2023 National Tour

=== Video games ===
Milady appears in the Japanese video game Persona 5 as the persona of Haru Okumura.
