= Wise Girl (film) =

1937 film by Leigh Jason

- Directed by: Leigh Jason
- Written by: Allan Scott (story and screenplay); Charles Norman (story)
- Produced by: Edward Kaufman
- Starring: Miriam Hopkins; Ray Milland; Walter Abel
- Cinematography: J. Peverell Marley
- Edited by: Jack Hively
- Music by: Roy Webb
- Production company: RKO Radio Pictures
- Distributed by: RKO Radio Pictures
- Release date: December 31, 1937
- Running time: 70 minutes
- Country: United States
- Language: English
- Budget: $448,000
- Box office: $490,000

Wise Girl is a 1937 American romantic comedy film directed by Leigh Jason and starring Miriam Hopkins, Ray Milland and Walter Abel. The screenplay concerns a wealthy socialite who tries to gain custody of her orphaned nieces.

== Plot ==
Susan Fletcher and her millionaire father, Simon, are eager to take care of her late sister's two daughters, Joan and Katie, but her deceased brother-in-law's will placed them in the custody of his brother, John O'Halloran. Mr. Fletcher's lawyers inform him that there is nothing they can do, unless John can be shown to be unemployed. However, though he loses jobs frequently, he also seems to be able to find new ones just as quickly. Susan decides to investigate.

She passes herself off as an impoverished actress and talks John's kindly landlord into giving her a place to stay. She becomes acquainted with John, a struggling painter, the two girls, and their friends, boxer/sculptor Mike Malloy and harmless alcoholic Karl Stevens. Susan and John begin to fall in love, but when Susan tries to help him out, it only seems to lose him all of his jobs. When she informs her father of these developments, he is delighted. Despite her protests, he has the authorities pick up the two girls for a custody hearing. John learns of Susan's real identity, and assumes she is in on the plot.

As John is now out of work, the girls are given to the Fletchers. When it becomes clear to Susan that they are desperately unhappy to be away from John, she tells them they can go home. However, when they find her weeping over the whole mess, they agree that her plan to keep them so that John will have time to paint is a good one, and agree to stay.

Stubborn, John rejects Susan's suggestion that he enter a painting contest with a large prize of money. Susan gets the police to put John in jail on trumped up charges, and sees to it that he gets no food unless he paints. He finally caves in, then paints an unflattering caricature of her and her father. To his surprise, Susan is delighted with the work and arranges to sell it for a large sum. When John is released, he realizes that Susan is looking out for his welfare, and the couple reconcile.

== Cast ==
- Miriam Hopkins as Susan Fletcher
- Ray Milland as John O'Halloran
- Walter Abel as Karl Stevens
- Henry Stephenson as Simon Fletcher
- Alec Craig as Dermot O'Neil
- Guinn Williams as Mike Malloy
- Betty Philson as Joan O'Halloran
- Marianna Strelby as Katie O'Halloran
- Margaret Dumont as Mrs. Bell-Rivington
- Jean De Briac as George (as Jean deBriac)
- Ivan Lebedeff as Prince Michael
- Rafael Storm as Prince Ivan
- Gregory Gaye as Prince Leopold
- Richard Lane as 1st Detective
- Tom Kennedy as 2nd Detective
- James Finlayson as the Sheriff

== Reception ==
The film recorded a loss of $114,000.
