= A. D. Peters =

British literary agent

Augustus Dudley Peters (1892–1973) was a British literary agent. Born in Schleswig-Holstein, Germany, the fourth of the seven children of a farmer, he was informally adopted at the age of three by an aunt who lived in England and was educated at Haberdashers' Aske's Boys' School in Hampstead and St. John's College, Cambridge. After working as a magazine editor and drama critic, he founded his literary agency in 1924, and subsequently represented many leading writers including Hilaire Belloc, J. B. Priestley, Evelyn Waugh, Arthur Koestler, Kingsley Amis, G. B. Stern and Rebecca West. He was one of the producers of Last Holiday, which was written by J.B. Priestley and J. Lee Thompson. From 1959 onwards, the agency became a partnership and was gradually enlarged. He retired in 1972 and died a few months later.

Following Peters's death, the agency merged with Fraser and Dunlop Agency to produce Peters, Fraser & Dunlop, which in 1999 became PFD, with offices in London and New York City. After a time under the ownership of CSS Stellar, it was bought in June 2008 by a consortium led by Andrew Neil, but not before most leading agents had walked out to form United Agents.
