= Walter Abel =

American actor (1898–1987)

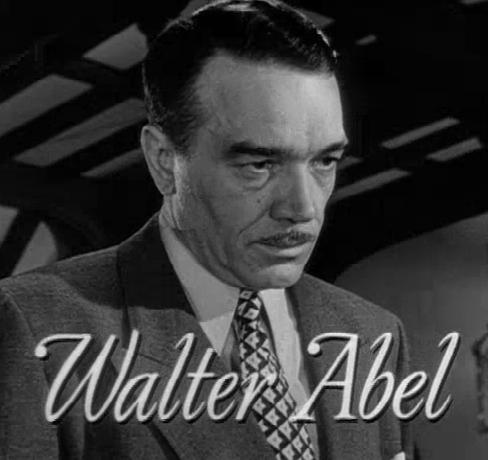
- Trailer for 13 Rue Madeleine (1947)
- Born: June 6, 1898; Saint Paul, Minnesota, U.S.
- Died: March 26, 1987 (aged 88); Essex, Connecticut, U.S.
- Occupation: Actor
- Years active: 1918–1984
- Spouse: Marietta Bitter (m. 1926; died 1979)
- Children: 2

Walter Abel (June 6, 1898 – March 26, 1987) was an American stage, film, and radio actor whose career spanned nearly seven decades.

== Life ==
Abel was born in St. Paul, Minnesota, the son of Christine (née Becker) and Richard Michael Abel. Abel graduated from the American Academy of Dramatic Arts where he had studied in 1917 and joined a touring company. His brother Alfred died in 1922 from tuberculosis contracted while serving overseas in World War I. Abel was married to concert harpist Marietta Bitter.

== Career ==
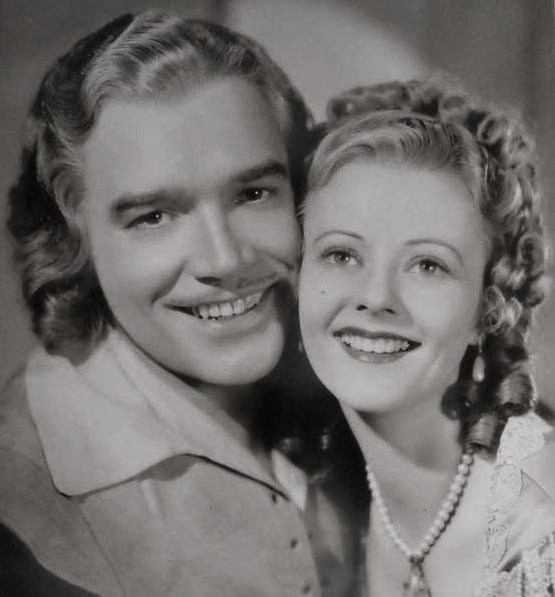
Abel as D'Artagnan, with Heather Angel in The Three Musketeers

Abel made his film debut in 1918 with a small part in Out of a Clear Sky, and his Broadway debut in Forbidden in 1919.

In 1924, he appeared in two Eugene O'Neill plays simultaneously: Bound East for Cardiff at the Provincetown Playhouse and Desire Under the Elms at the Greenwich Village Theater. His many theatre credits include As You Like It (1923), William Congreve's Love for Love (1925), Anton Chekhov's The Seagull (1929–1930), Mourning Becomes Electra (1929), Kaufman and Hart's Merrily We Roll Along (1934), and Trelawny of the 'Wells'. He also appeared in Channing Pollock's play The Enemy (1926) with Fay Bainter, adapted to film as The Enemy (1927) with Lillian Gish and Ralph Forbes. Abel made his stage debut in London in the 1929 Coquette.

His first major film role was as D'Artagnan in RKO Pictures' 1935 The Three Musketeers. He played hyperactive agent Danny Reed in the 1942 musical comedy Holiday Inn, with Bing Crosby and Fred Astaire.

Abel went on to play in more than sixty films, and was a vice president of the Screen Actors' Guild.

Abel also appeared as a concert narrator or reader with Eugene Ormandy and the Philadelphia Orchestra in Aaron Copland's Lincoln Portrait in 1951, and in Dylan Thomas' Under Milk Wood in 1953.

== Death ==
Abel died March 26, 1987, of a myocardial infarction at a nursing home in Essex, Connecticut. He was cremated and a memorial service was held at the Little Church Around the Corner in Manhattan. His ashes were combined with those of his wife and scattered in Long Island Sound.

== Filmography ==
=== Film ===
Year	Title	Role	Notes
1918	Out of a Clear Sky		Uncredited; Lost film
1920	The North Wind's Malice	Tom	
1930	Liliom	Carpenter	
1935	The Three Musketeers	d'Artagnan	
1936	Two in the Dark	Ford Adams	
1936	The Lady Consents	Stanley Ashton	
1936	The Witness Chair	James 'Jim' Trent	
1936	Fury	District Attorney	
1936	We Went to College	Phil Talbot	
1936	Second Wife	Kenneth Carpenter Sr.	
1937	Green Light	John Stafford	
1937	Portia on Trial	Dan Foster	
1937	Wise Girl	Karl	
1938	Law of the Underworld	Warren Rogers	
1938	Racket Busters	Hugh Allison	
1938	Men with Wings	Nick Ranson	
1939	King of the Turf	Robert Barnes	
1939	First Offenders	Gregory Stone	
1939	Miracle on Main Street'	Jim Foreman	
1940	Dance, Girl, Dance	Judge	
1940	Arise, My Love	Phillips	
1940	Who Killed Aunt Maggie?	Dr. George Benedict	
1940	Michael Shayne: Private Detective	Elliott Thomas	
1941	Hold Back the Dawn	Inspector Hammock	
1941	Skylark	George Gorell	
1941	Glamour Boy	Anthony J. Colder	
1942	Beyond the Blue Horizon	Prof. Thornton	
1942	Holiday Inn	Danny Reed	
1942	Wake Island	Cmdr. Roberts	
1942	Star Spangled Rhythm	B.G. DeSoto	
1943	Fired Wife	Chris McClelland	
1943	The Last Will and Testament of Tom Smith	Jack / A Flyer / Opening Narrator	Short Film
1943	So Proudly We Hail!	Chaplain	
1944	Follow the Boys	Walter Abel	Uncredited
1944	The Hitler Gang	Narrator (voice)	
1944	Mr. Skeffington	George Trellis	
1944	An American Romance	Howard Clinton	
1945	The Affairs of Susan	Richard Aiken	
1945	Duffy's Tavern	Director	
1945	Kiss and Tell	Harry Archer	
1946	The Kid from Brooklyn	Gabby Sloan	
1946	13 Rue Madeleine	Charles Gibson	
1947	Variety Girl	Walter Abel	Uncredited
1947	The Fabulous Joe	Milo Terkel	
1948	Dream Girl	George Allerton	
1948	That Lady in Ermine	Major Horvath / Benvenuto	
1948	Picture in Your Mind	Narrator	Short Film
1948	Neighbor to the North	The American	Short Film
1953	So This Is Love	Colonel James Moore	
1953	Island in the Sky	Col. Fuller	
1954	Night People	Maj. R.A. Foster, MD	
1955	The Indian Fighter	Captain Trask	
1956	The Steel Jungle	Warden Bill Keller	
1957	Bernardine	Mr. Beaumont	
1957	Raintree County	T.D. Shawnessy	
1958	Handle with Care	Prof. Roger Bowden	
1964	Quick, Let's Get Married	The Thief	
1965	Mirage	Charles Stewart Calvin	
1965	Israel: The Story of the Jewish People	Narrator	Short Film; uncredited
1972	Silent Night, Bloody Night	Mayor Adams	
1979	Israel: The Story of the Jewish People	Narrator	Short Film; credited as Walter Able
1985	Grace Quigley	Homer Morrison	Final role

=== Television ===
Year	Title	Role	Notes
1948	Critic at Large	Self	Episode: "Episode #1.16"
1948–1949	The Philco Television Playhouse	Macduff	2 episodes
1949	The Chevrolet Tele-Theatre	Sir Wilfred Roberts	Episode: "Witness for the Prosecution"
1950	Masterpiece Playhouse	George Tesman	2 episodes
1950–1951	The Prudential Family Playhouse	Egbert Flound / Sam Dodsworth	2 episodes
1950–1953	Lux Video Theatre	Father / Joe Holmby	2 episodes
1951	Faith Baldwin Romance Theatre		Episode: "To My Beloved Wife"
1951	The Colgate Comedy Hour	Self	Guest
1951	Who Said That?	Self	Episode: "March 12, 1951"
1951	The Sam Levenson Show	Self	Episode: "Walter Abel and Son"
1951	The Ed Sullivan Show	Self	Episode: "Episode #4.39"
1951	20 Questions	Self	Episode: "Walter Abel"
1951–1952	Robert Montgomery Presents	Father / Harry Archer	2 episodes
1951–1952	Tales of Tomorrow	Doctor Allen	4 episodes
1952	Celanese Theatre	Reed	Episode: "Yellow Jack"
1952	It's News to Me	Self	Episode: "Walter Abel, Signe Hasso"
1953	The Ford Television Theatre		Episode: "There's No Place Like Home"
1954	Ethel and Albert	Gilbert	Episode: "The Income Tax"
1954	Studio One	Juror No. 4	Episode: "Twelve Angry Men"
1954	Armstrong Circle Theatre		Episode: "The Judged"
1954	The Red Buttons Show		Episode: "November 12, 1954"
1955	Playwrights '56	Dr. Harmon	Episode: "The Answer"
1955	The Martha Raye Show	Self	Episode: "Stubby Kaye, Johnnie Ray, Walter Abel"
1956	Climax!	Stewart	Episode: "The Midas Touch"
1956	The Joseph Cotten Show: On Trial		Episode: "The Person and Property of Margery Hay"
1956–1958	Playhouse 90	Mr. Wayde	2 episodes
1957	The 20th Century Fox Hour	McKinley	Episode: "The Great American Hoax"
1957	Kraft Television Theatre		Episode: "Heroes Walk on Sand"
1958	Suspicion	Major Harvey Denbrow	Episode: "Meeting in Paris"
1960	The Play of the Week	Inspector	Episode: "The Enchanted"
1963	The Defenders	Ben Burke	Episode: "A Book for Burning"
1963	The Farmer's Daughter	General Todd	Episode: "An Enterprising Young Man"
1964	East Side West Side	Brewer Bradford	Episode: "Here Today"
1965	The Mike Douglas Show	Self	Episode: "Episode #4.196"
1966	Seaway	Goddard Borglun	Episode: "The Viking"
1966	Bob Hope Presents the Chrysler Theatre	Reynard Pitney	Episode: "And Baby Makes Five"
1971	NBC Children's Theatre	Self	Episode: "Super Plastic Elastic Goggles"
1973	The Man Without a Country	Col. A.B. Morgan	Direct-to-TV Movie
1976	The American Woman: Portraits of Courage	Judge	Direct-to-TV Documentary

== Radio appearances ==
Year	Program	Episode/source
1941	Gulf Screen Guild Theatre	No Time for Comedy
1944	Lady Esther Screen Guild Theatre	Phantom Lady
1945	Lady Esther Screen Guild Theatre	Double Indemnity
1947	Theatre Guild on the Air	No Time for Comedy
1947	Suspense	Quiet Desperation
1952	Theatre Guild on the Air	The Bishop Misbehaves
