= Pia Douwes =

Dutch actress, musical singer

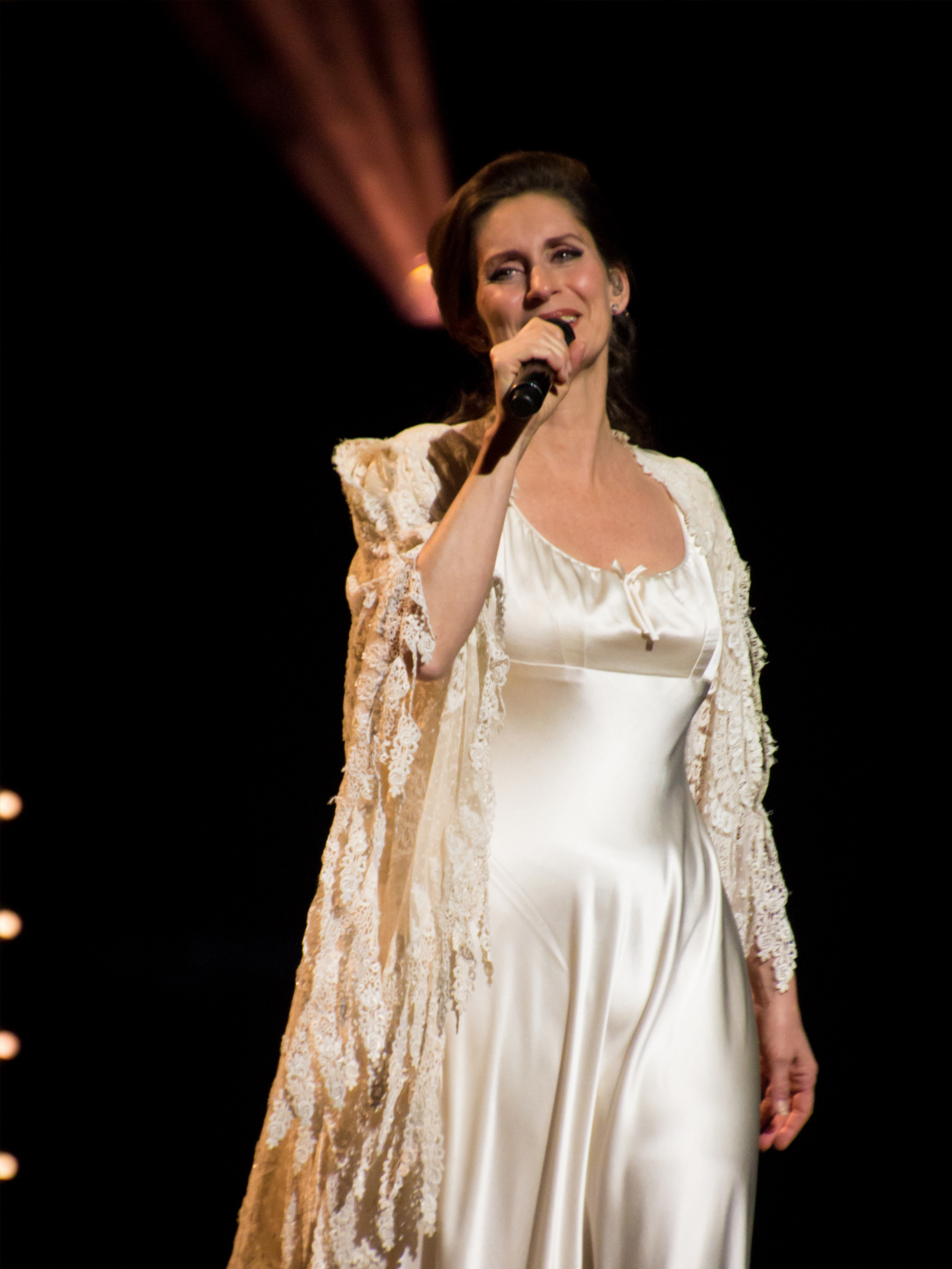
Pia Douwes

Pia Douwes (born 5 August 1964) is a Dutch actress in musical theatre in Europe. She is best known for having created the title role in the German-language musical Elisabeth.

== Biography ==
Douwes was born in Amsterdam, North Holland, The Netherlands, as Petronella Irene Allegonda Douwes, to an arts dealer and a social worker, and is the grandniece of Doris Day. Initially Douwes wanted to become a nurse for mentally handicapped children, then she danced in a disco when she was 19 years old and realised that she wanted to dance. She went to London and searched for a dance school in the Yellow Pages. She chose the Brooking School of Ballet. Without any prior dance education, she auditioned (with a sprained ankle) and was accepted. One year later she attended a musical workshop with Susi Nicoletti and Sam Cane in Vienna. Cane is said to have told Douwes' father at that time: "If she doesn't become a star, I'll hang myself!"

In 1986, she got her first small part in the German-language premiere of Little Shop of Horrors in Vienna. More small parts followed and in 1987 she got her first part in a larger production, as a Swing in Cats in Amsterdam. With this production she toured Russia in 1988, playing Grizabella and Jellylorum.

More parts followed, including Fantine in the original Amsterdam production of Les Misérables in 1991, but her great break came in 1992, when she got the title role in the world premiere of Elisabeth in Vienna, Austria. Though the Viennese papers wrote a lot of scathing criticism, such as "Munter geht die Sisi unter" ("Sisi perishes") and though they denied Douwes singing and acting talent of any kind, Douwes became (along with Uwe Kröger) an acclaimed musical star and reprised the title role numerous times. Elisabeth is today the most successful German-language musical of all-time.

Until 1994 she played Elisabeth, then played more parts such as Rizzo in Grease (Vienna) and Eva Perón in Evita in the Dutch touring production.

She was also active in other areas; she dubbed the leading part for the Dutch versions of the movies Pocahontas and Pocahontas II: Journey to a New World. Additionally she did the gala evenings In love with Musical along with her colleagues Uwe Kröger, Marika Lichter and Viktor Gernot.

In 1999, she played Velma Kelly in the Dutch premiere of Chicago. Then Douwes went back to her roots and played the leading part of Elisabeth again in the Dutch and German premieres of the musical. After a total of 900 performances as the Austrian empress, she went back to the Netherlands in February 2002 to take part in the Broadway musical Fosse, along with Dutch musical stars Simone Kleinsma and Stanley Burleson.

In March 2003 she got the chance to play Milady de Winter in the world premiere of the Dutch musical 3 Musketiers (The Three Musketeers). The musical was later filmed (with her) and is now available on DVD.

In 2004 she played Velma Kelly in Chicago again, but this time she performed in the West End of London and then on Broadway, being the first Dutch actress to take a leading role in a production on Broadway.

Back again in the Netherlands she played Clara in Passion. Then she went back to Germany to play Milady de Winter again in the German premiere of 3 Musketiere in Theater des Westens in Berlin. She played the part until 30 October 2005.

In 2007, she appeared as a judge on Op zoek naar Evita (In search for Evita), a Dutch reality show. The winner was cast as Eva Perón, a role Douwes played over a decade ago, in a new Dutch production of Evita.

In 2008, Pia was a judge on the German reality show Ich Tarzan du Jane in which they looked for both Tarzan and Jane to star in the German production of Tarzan and returned as a judge and coach on "Op zoek naar Joseph", similar to the search for Evita, but this series searched for the male lead in the musical Joseph and the Amazing Technicolor Dreamcoat.

In late 2008, she donned the turban as the infamous Norma Desmond in the Dutch touring production of Andrew Lloyd Webber's Sunset Boulevard, alternating in the lead role with her friend and previous Les Misérables, Chicago and Fosse co-star, Simone Kleinsma.

In 2009 she returned yet again to judge and coach the contestants of a new Op Zoek Naar... series, this time searching for the woman who would play Mary Poppins.

After the program ended, Pia played the role 'Velma Kelly' for six weeks on the West End in 2009.

From August 2010 until January 2011 she played the 'Killer Queen' in the rock musical We Will Rock You in Utrecht.

She then toured through the Netherlands with the Dutch production of Master Class, in which she played the part of Maria Callas. The tour lasted until the end of May 2011, with two extra performances in September 2011.

Pia has played the role of Mrs. Danvers in the Stuttgart production of Rebecca, Claire Zachanassian in the Vienna production of Der Besuch der alten Dame, Diane in the Fürth production of Next To Normaland Mrs. Wilkinson in the Dutch production of Billy Elliot the Musical.

She has taken part in over 25 CD productions, and was a duet partner of José Carreras.

In 2023, she took part in the television show Het Onbekende.

== Musical Engagements ==
Year	Production	Role	Location	Note	Ref
1986	Little Shop of Horrors	Crystal	Vienna, Austria		
1986	Sam, Mario & Dancers	Ensemble	Vienna, Austria		
1987	Cats	Swing Gabriella & Jellylorum	Amsterdam, The Netherlands		
1988	Cats	Swing Gabriella & Jellylorum	Russia	Tour	
1988 – 1989	Cats	Swing Gabriella & Jellylorum	Vienna, Austria		
1989 – 1990	Adele in Casablanca	Ensemble	The Netherlands	Tour	
1990	West Side Story	Maria	Belgium & the Netherlands	Tour	
1991 – 1992	Les Misérables	Fantine	Amsterdam & Scheveningen		
1992 – 1994	Elisabeth	Empress Elisabeth	Vienna, Austria		
1994	Other People's Money	Kate Sullivan	Prague, Czech Republic		
1994	West Side Story	Maria	Amstetten, Austria		
1994 – 1995	Grease	Rizzo	Vienna, Austria		
1995 – 1996	Cabaret	Sally Bowles	Bad Hersfeld, Germany		
1995	Cats	Grizabella	Vienna, Austria	Only on August 10th, 1995.	
1995 – 1997	Evita	Eva Péron	The Netherlands	Tour	
1997	Rocky Horror Show	Janet	Bad Hersfeld, Germany		
1997 – 1999	Dance! Dance! Dance!	Soloist	Vienna, Austria		
1997 – 1998	Jane Eyre	Jane Eyre	The Netherlands	Tour	
November 1998	Savanah Bay	Young Woman	The Netherlands		
December 1999	The Andrew Lloyd Webber Musical Gala	Soloist	Germany	Tour	
1999	Chicago	Velma Kelly	Utrecht, The Netherlands		
1999 – 2000	Elisabeth	Empress Elisabeth	Scheveningen, The Netherlands		
2000	Sweeney Todd	Beggar Woman	London (West End), England	West End Debut	
December 2000	Cole Porter's Songbook	Soloist			
2001 – 2002	Elisabeth	Empress Elisabeth	Essen, Germany		
2002	Fosse	Soloist	The Netherlands	Tour	
2003 – 2004	3 Musketiers	Milady de Winter	Rotterdam, The Netherlands		
2004	Chicago	Velma Kelly	London, England		
2004	Chicago	Velma Kelly	New York (Broadway), United States of America	Broadway Debut	
2004 – 2005	Passion	Clara	The Netherlands	Tour	
2005	3 Musketiers	Milady de Winter	Berlin, Germany		
2005	Elisabeth	Empress Elisabeth	Stuttgart, Germany		
2006	Cabaret	Sally Bowles	Amsterdam, The Netherlands		
2006 – 2007	3 Musketiers	Milday de Winters	Stuttgart, Germany		
2007	Best of Musical	Soloist	Switzerland & Germany	Tour	
June – July 2007	Cats	Grizabella	Amsterdam, The Netherlands		
December 5, 2007	Chicago: 10th Anniversary Gala	Velma Kelly	London, England		
2008	3 Musketiers	Milady de Winter	Stuttgart, Germany	04.01. – 27.01.	
2008	Elisabeth	Empress Elisabeth	Berlin, Germany	20.04 – 06.07.	
2008 – 2009	Sunset Boulevard	Norma Desmond	Belgium & The Netherlands	Tour	
2009	Chicago	Velma Kelly	London (West End), England		
2010	We Will Rock You	Killer Queen	The Netherlands		
2011	Master Class	Maria Callas	Belgium & The Netherlands		
2011 – 2013	Rebecca	Mrs. Danvers	Stuttgart, Germany		
2012 – 2013	Kramer vs. Kramer	Johanna Kramer	The Netherlands	Tour	
July – September 2013	The Visit	Claire Zachanassian	Thun, Switzerland		
October 2013	Next To Normal	Diana Goodman	Fürth, Germany	Tour	
2014 – 2015	Billy Elliot	Mrs. Wilkinson	Scheveningen, The Netherlands		
February – June 2014	The Visit	Claire Zachanassian	Vienna, Austria		
April – May 2015	Next To Normal	Diana Goodman	Fürth, Germany	Tour	
April – May 2016	Next To Normal	Diana Goodman	Vienna, Austria	Tour	
2016	Sunset Boulevard	Norma Desmond	Dortmund, Germany		
June 2016	Wenn Rosenblätter Fallen	Rose	Austria & Germany	Tour	
2016 – 2017	Spamalot	Lady of the Lake	Salzburg, Austria		
June 2017	Elisabeth in Concert	Empress Elisabeth	Apeldoorn, The Netherlands	Concert	
2017 – 2018	Sunset Boulevard	Norma Desmond	Bonn, Switzerland		
April 2017	Next To Normal	Diana Goodman	Fürth, Germany	Tour	
April 2017	Next To Normal	Diana Goodman	Dresden, Germany	Tour	
May 2018	Ein wenig Farbe	Helena and others	Vienna, Austria		
June 2018	Elisabeth in Concert	Empress Elisabeth	Baarn, The Netherlands	Concert	
September 2018	Ludwig²	Amme Sybille Meilhausen	Füssen, Germany		
2018 – 2019	The Addams Family	Morticia Addams	The Netherlands	Tour	
July 2019	Elisabeth in Concert	Empress Elisabeth	Vienna, Austria	Concert	
2022	The Prom	Dee Dee Allen	The Netherlands	Tour	
2023 – 2024	Follies	Sally Durant Plummer	Wiesbaden, Germany		
2025	Elisabeth	older Empress Elisabeth	The Netherlands	Tour	

== Discography ==
- 1987 Cats, Cast recording
- 1989 It's time to say we care, Single for the benefit of the Aids-Gala in Vienna
- 1991 Les Misérables, Cast recording
- 1992 Hier sta ik, Single
- 1992 Ich gehör nur mir / I belong to me, Single
- 1992 Elisabeth, Cast recording
- 1994 Aidan Bell: Time Warp Duett: Maybe we can make it
- 1994 Grease, Live recording
- 1995 Living Water, Benefit CD
- 1995 Musical Christmas in Vienna, Sampler
- 1995 Pocahontas, Original Soundtrack Holland
- 1995 Evita, Cast recording
- 1995 Cabaret, Cast recording
- 1996 Stars singen Weihnachtslieder, Sampler
- 1996 Rocky Horror Show, Cast recording
- 1997 Still in love with Musical, Live recording
- 1997 Shades of night, Musicals go rock, Sampler
- 1998 10 für Zehn, Benefit CD
- 1998 Pocahontas II, Original Soundtrack Holland
- 1998 Joop van den Enden presenteert: De beste uit de musicals, Sampler
- 1998 Chicago, Cast recording
- 1999 Elisabeth, Cast recording (Netherlands)
- 1999 Mijn leven is van mij, Single (Dutch version of Ich gehör nur mir / I belong to me)
- 2000 Die fantastische Welt des Musicals, Sampler
- 2000 Alles Musical, Sampler
- 2000 Hoogtepunten uit de musicals, aangeboden door Persil, Sampler
- 2000 Hilversum Calling, Sampler
- 2000 Zing dan! Luisterliedjes, Sampler
- 2001 Ernst Daniel Smit e amici: Una voce particulare - Duet, Sampler "Tu Cosa Fai Stasera"
- 2001 Elisabeth, Cast recording in Essen, Germany
- 2001 3 CD-Track: "Ich gehör nur mir", Single
- 2001 In love with musical again, Live recording
- 2001 Steve Barton memorial concert, Live recording
- 2001 Uwe Kröger: Only the best
- 2001 Uwe Kröger: Musical Moments
- 2002 Het mooiste uit de nederlandse musicals, Sampler
- 2002 Fosse (Bye bye, blackbird), Promotional single
- 2003 De drie Musketiers, Cast recording
- 2003 De drie Musketiers - Special Edition, Cast recording, extra's CD & DVD
- 2003 Uwe Kröger: Musical Moments 2
- 2004 Het mooiste uit de nederlandse musicals II, Sampler
- 2004 Passion, Cast recording
- 2005 Die drei Musketiere, Cast recording
- 2006 Cabaret, Cast recording
- 2007 Dezemberlieder (December Songs), Solo CD of Maury Yeston's famous song cycle in German language
- 2009 Sunset Boulevard CD to the Dutch Tourproduction, complete live recording with Simone Kleinsma (disc 1) and some studiotracks with Pia Douwes (disc 2)
- 2013 Somewhere in the Audience compilation of four of Eric Woolfson Broadway style soundtracks

== Awards and nominations ==
- Image 1996 for Elisabeth in Vienna [Won]
- 1996 Bad Hersfeld Audience Award for Cabaret in Bad Hersfeld [Won]
- 2000 John Kraaijkamp Musical Award, Best Actress in a Leading Role for Elisabeth in Scheveningen [Nominated]
- 2002 John Kraaijkamp Musical Award, Best Actress Abroad for Elisabeth in Essen [Won]
- 2003 John Kraaijkamp Musical Award, Best Actress in a Leading Role for 3 Musketiers in Rotterdam [Nominated]
- 2005 John Kraaijkamp Musical Award, Best Actress in a Supporting Role for Passion in the Netherlands [Nominated]
- 2006 Da Capo Award, Best Musical Actress for 3 Musketiere in Berlin [Won]
- 2006 Da Capo Award, Best Female Voice [Won], she won this award 6 times.
- 2014 John Kraaijkamp Musical Award, Best Actress in a Leading Role for Billy Elliot the Musical in Scheveningen [Nominated]

Pia has also been given the award for Female Leading Role six times by the readers of the German magazine "Musicals" for her performances in Elisabeth also the best Female with the most beautiful voice.
